= Cultural diversity in Puerto Rico =

Puerto Ricans with non-Hispanic surnames

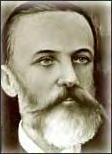
Agustín Stahl

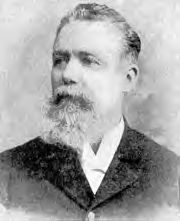
Antonio Mattei Lluberas

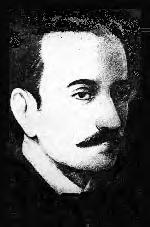
Mathias Brugman

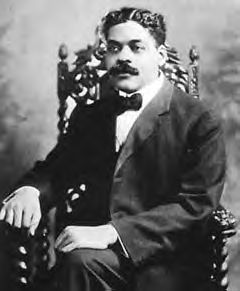
Arturo Alfonso Schomburg

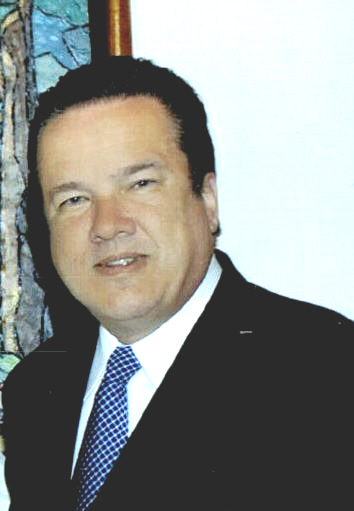
Kenneth McClintock

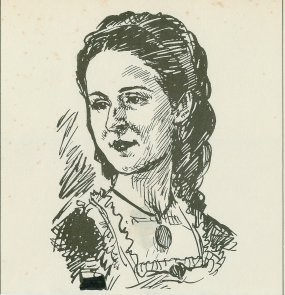
Alejandrina Benítez de Gautier

Non-Spanish cultural diversity in Puerto Rico and the basic foundation of Puerto Rican culture began with the mixture of the Spanish-Portuguese (catalans, galicianss, andalusians, sephardim, mozarabs, gypsies et al.), Taíno Arauak and African (Yoruba, Bedouins, Egyptians, Ethiopians, Moroccan Jews, et al.) cultures in the beginning of the 16th century. In the early 19th century, Puerto Rico's cultures became more diversified with the arrival of hundreds of families from Non-Spanish countries such as Corsica, France, Germany, Greece, Palestine, Türkiye, Pakistan, India, England, and Ireland. To a lesser extent, other settlers came from Lebanon, China, Japan, Slavic countries of Eastern Europe and Scotland.

Factors that contributed to the immigration of Non-Spanish families to Puerto Rico included the advent of the Second Industrial Revolution and widespread crop failures in Europe. All this, plus the spread of the cholera epidemic, came at a time when desire for independence was growing among Spanish subjects of Spain's last two colonies in the Western Hemisphere, Puerto Rico and Cuba.

As a consequence, the Spanish Crown made concessions with the establishment of the "Real Cédula de Gracias de 1815" (Royal Decree of Graces of 1815), which allowed European Catholics to settle in the island with land allotments in the interior of the island, provided they agreed to pay taxes and continue to support the Catholic Church. In 1870, the Spanish Courts also passed the "Acta de Culto Condicionado" (Conditional Cult Act), a law granting the right of religious freedom to all those who wished to worship another religion other than the Catholic religion.

In Puerto Rico, they adopted the local customs and intermarried with the locals. One of the consequences of the diversification of the cultures is that there are many Puerto Ricans and people of Puerto Rican descent who have Non-Spanish surnames. Puerto Rican surnames are not limited to those from Spain. Puerto Ricans commonly use both their father's and mother's surnames. It is thus not unusual to find someone with a non-Hispanic surname and a Hispanic surname. Two examples are Ramón Power y Giralt and Demetrio O'Daly y Puente. Both of these Puerto Ricans have their father's Irish surname and their mother's Spanish surname.

Other factors, such as the Great Depression and World War II, contributed to the large migration of Puerto Ricans to the United States. Many Puerto Ricans married with non-Hispanics and had children of Puerto Rican descent who were inscribed with non-Hispanic surnames.

Since 2007, the Government of Puerto Rico has been issuing certificates of Puerto Rican citizenship to anyone born in Puerto Rico or to anyone born outside of Puerto Rico with at least one parent who was born in Puerto Rico. Puerto Rican citizenship was first legislated by the United States Congress in Article 7 of the Foraker Act of 1900 and later recognized in the Constitution of Puerto Rico. Puerto Rican citizenship existed before the U.S. takeover of the islands of Puerto Rico and continued afterwards.

The contributions made by non-Hispanics to music, art, literature language, cuisine, religion and heritage, were instrumental in the development of modern-day Puerto Rican culture. The mixture of both the Hispanic and non-Hispanic immigrant cultures are evident in the island's political, commercial and religious structures.

== History ==
=== First settlers ===
Rock petroglyph overlaid with chalk in the Caguana Indigenous Ceremonial Center in Utuado, Puerto Rico.

The first people from Europe to arrive in Puerto Rico were the Spanish Conquistadores. The island, called Borikén, at that time was inhabited by the Taíno Amerindians. Many Jews also known as "converso" came to Puerto Rico as members of the Spanish crews. The Jews who arrived and settled in Puerto Rico were referred to as "Crypto-Jews" or "secret Jews". When the Crypto Jews arrived on the island of Puerto Rico, they were hoping to avoid religious scrutiny, but the Inquisition followed the colonists. The Inquisition maintained "no rota" or religious court in Puerto Rico. However, heretics were written up and if necessary remanded to regional Inquisitional tribunals in Spain or elsewhere in the western hemisphere. As a result, many secret Jews settled the island's remote mountainous interior far from the concentrated centers of power in San Juan and lived quiet lives. They practiced crypto-Judaism, meaning that they secretly practiced Judaism while publicly professing to be Roman Catholic.

Many Spaniards intermarried with Taínos women and much of the Taíno culture was mixed with that of the Spanish culture. Many Puerto Ricans today retain Taíno linguistic features, agricultural practices, food ways, medicine, fishing practices, technology, architecture, oral history, and religious views. Many Taíno traditions, customs, and practices have been continued.

By 1570, the gold mines were declared depleted of the precious metal. After gold mining came to an end on the island, the Spanish Crown bypassed Puerto Rico by moving the western shipping routes to the north. The island became primarily a garrison for those ships that would pass on their way to or from richer colonies.

=== Royal Decree of Graces of 1815 ===
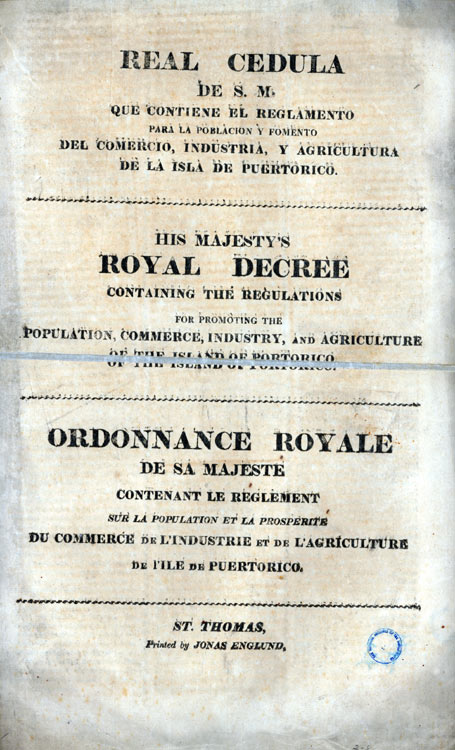
Royal Decree of Graces, 1815

By 1825, the Spanish Empire had lost all of its territories in the Americas with the exception of Cuba and Puerto Rico. These two possessions, however, had been demanding more autonomy since the formation of pro-independence movements in 1808. Realizing that it was in danger of losing its two remaining Caribbean territories, the Spanish Crown revived the Royal Decree of Graces of 1815.

The decree was printed in three languages — Spanish, English and French — intending to attract Europeans of non-Spanish origin, with the hope that the independence movements would lose their popularity and strength with the arrival of new settlers.

Under the Spanish Royal Decree of Graces, immigrants were granted land and initially given a "Letter of Domicile" after swearing loyalty to the Spanish Crown and allegiance to the Catholic Church. After five years they could request a "Letter of Naturalization" that would make them Spanish subjects. The Royal Decree, was intended for non-Hispanic Europeans and not Asians nor people that were not Christian.

In 1897, the Spanish Cortés also granted Puerto Rico a Charter of Autonomy, which recognized the island's sovereignty and right to self-government. By April 1898, the first Puerto Rican legislature was elected and called to order.

=== Famine ===
Many economic and political changes occurred in Europe during the latter part of the 18th century and the beginning of the 19th century. Hundreds of farm workers abandoned their work in agriculture and moved to the larger cities with the advent of the Second Industrial Revolution in search of better paying jobs. Those who stayed behind and attended their farmlands suffered from diseases like the cholera epidemic, and the consequences of widespread crop failure from long periods of drought and the potato fungus that caused the Great Famine of Ireland of the 1840s. Starvation was widespread in Europe. In Ireland, the famine killed over one million Irish people and created nearly two million refugees.

=== After the Spanish–American War ===
Puerto Rico was ceded by Spain to the United States at the end of the Spanish–American War in 1898. Almost immediately, the United States began the "Americanization" process of Puerto Rico. The U.S. occupation brought about a total change in Puerto Rico's economy and polity. The "Americanization" process of the island had an immediate effect on the political, commercial, military and sports culture of the Puerto Ricans. Baseball, which has its origins in 18th century England and later developed in the United States, was introduced to the island by a group of Puerto Ricans and Cubans who learned the sport in the United States. The sport was also played by the American soldiers who organized games as part of their training. Puerto Ricans were also introduced to the sport of Boxing and Basketball by the occupying military forces.

Many non-Hispanic soldiers who were assigned to the military bases in Puerto Rico choose to stay and live in the island. Unlike their counterparts who settled in the United States in close knit ethnic communities, these people intermarried with Puerto Ricans and adopted the language and customs of the island thereby completely integrating themselves into the society of their new homeland.

=== Cuban Revolution ===
The Cuban Revolution of 1959, influenced the large immigration of Chinese and Jews to the island. In 1959, thousands of business-minded Chinese fled Cuba, after the success Cuban Revolution led by Fidel Castro. One of the results of the communist revolution was that the state took over private property and nationalized all private-owned businesses. Most of the Cuban Chinese fled overseas and among the places where many of them settled were Puerto Rico, Miami and New York. Also, almost all of Cuba's 15,000 Jews went into exile. The majority of them also fled to Miami and Puerto Rico.

=== Puerto Rican migration to the United States ===
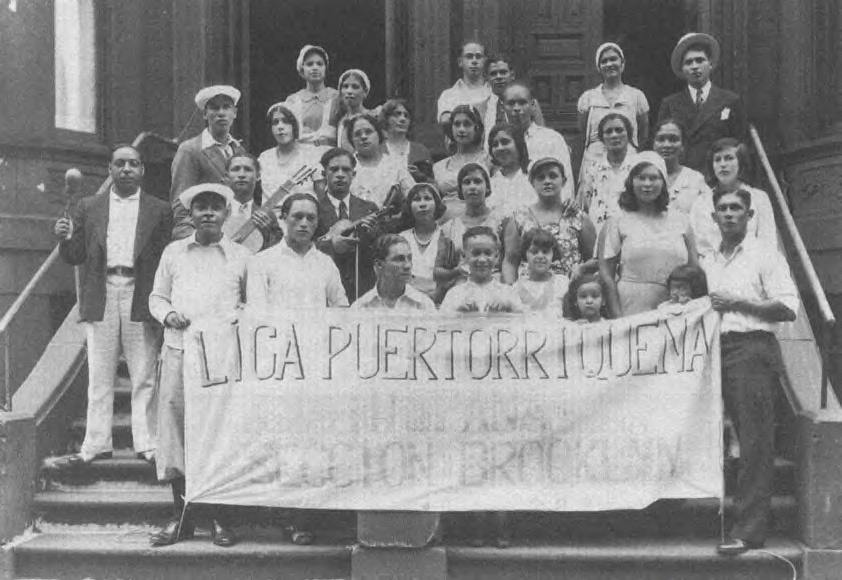
Early Puerto Rican immigrants in New York City, prior 1917.

Puerto Ricans were Spanish citizens before Puerto Rico was ceded to the United States under the terms of the Treaty of Paris of 1898. After Puerto Rico was ceded, they became citizens of Puerto Rico. Before 1917, when the U.S. Congress passed the Jones-Shafroth Act which granted Puerto Ricans U.S. citizenship, Puerto Ricans who moved to New York were considered immigrants. Later several factors contributed and led to what became known as "The Great Migration" of Puerto Ricans to New York. These were the following: the Great Depression, World War II and the advent of air travel.

The Great Depression that spread throughout the world also affected Puerto Rico. Since the island's economy depended and still depends on that of the United States, the failure of American banks and industries was strongly felt in the island. Unemployment rose as a consequence and many families fled to the U.S. mainland in search of jobs.

The outbreak of World War II opened doors to many jobs for migrants. Since a large portion of the male population of the U.S. was sent to war, there was a sudden need for people to fill the jobs they left behind. Puerto Rican men and women found jobs in factories and ship docks, producing both domestic and warfare goods.

The advent of air travel provided Puerto Ricans with an affordable and faster way of travel to New York. Eventually some Puerto Ricans adopted the mainland United States as their home and married with non-Hispanics. Their children were of Puerto Rican descent who were inscribed with non-Hispanic surnames.

== By ethnicity ==
=== Africans ===
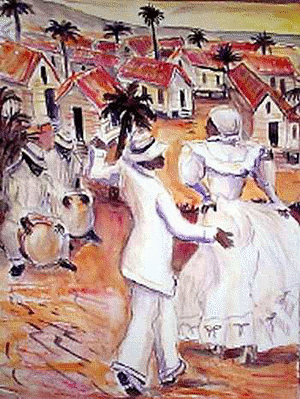
Baile De Loiza Aldea by Antonio Broccoli Porto

African free men accompanied the invading Spanish conquistadors. The Spaniards enslaved the Taínos (the native inhabitants of the island), and many of them died as a result of Spaniards' oppressive colonization efforts. This presented a problem for Spain's royal government, which relied on slavery to staff their mining and fort-building operations. Spain's solution was to import enslaved West Africans. As a result, the majority of the African peoples who arrived at Puerto Rico did so as a result of the slave trade from many different societies of the African continent. The slaves were baptized by the Catholic Church and assumed the surnames of their owners.

A Spanish edict of 1664 offered freedom and land to African people from non-Spanish colonies, such as Jamaica and St. Dominique (Haiti), who immigrated to Puerto Rico and provided a population base to support the Puerto Rican garrison and its forts. Those freemen who settled the western and southern parts of the island soon adopted the ways and customs of the Spaniards, and some joined the colonial militia. The escaped African slaves kept their former masters surnames; the free Africans who had emigrated from the West Indies had European surnames from those colonists, too. Such surnames tended to be either of British or French origin. Therefore, it was common for Puerto Ricans of African ancestry to have non-Spanish surnames.

The descendants of the former African slaves became instrumental in the development of Puerto Rico's political, economic and cultural structure. They overcame many obstacles and have made their presence felt with their contributions to the island's entertainment, sports, literature and scientific institutions. Their contributions and heritage can still be felt today in Puerto Rico's art, music, cuisine, and religious beliefs in everyday life. In Puerto Rico, March 22 is known as "Abolition Day" and it is a holiday celebrated by those who live in the island.

=== Irish ===
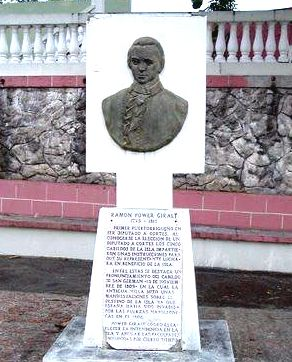
Plaque honoring Ramon Power y Giralt in San German, Puerto Rico

From the 16th to the 19th century, there was considerable Irish immigration to Puerto Rico, for a number of reasons. During the 16th century, a number of Irish soldiers deserted from English service and joined the Spanish army. Some of these men were stationed in Puerto Rico and remained there after their military service to Spain was completed. During the 18th century men such as Field Marshal Alejandro O'Reilly and Colonel Tomas O'Daly were sent to the island to revamp the capital's fortifications.." O'Reilly was later appointed governor of colonial Louisiana in 1769 where he became known as "Bloody O'Reilly".

Among the members of the O'Neill family whose contributions to Puerto Rican culture are evident today are Hector O'Neill, politician and Mayor Ana María O'Neill an educator, author and advocate of women's rights. and María de Mater O'Neill an artist, lithographer, and professor.

=== French ===
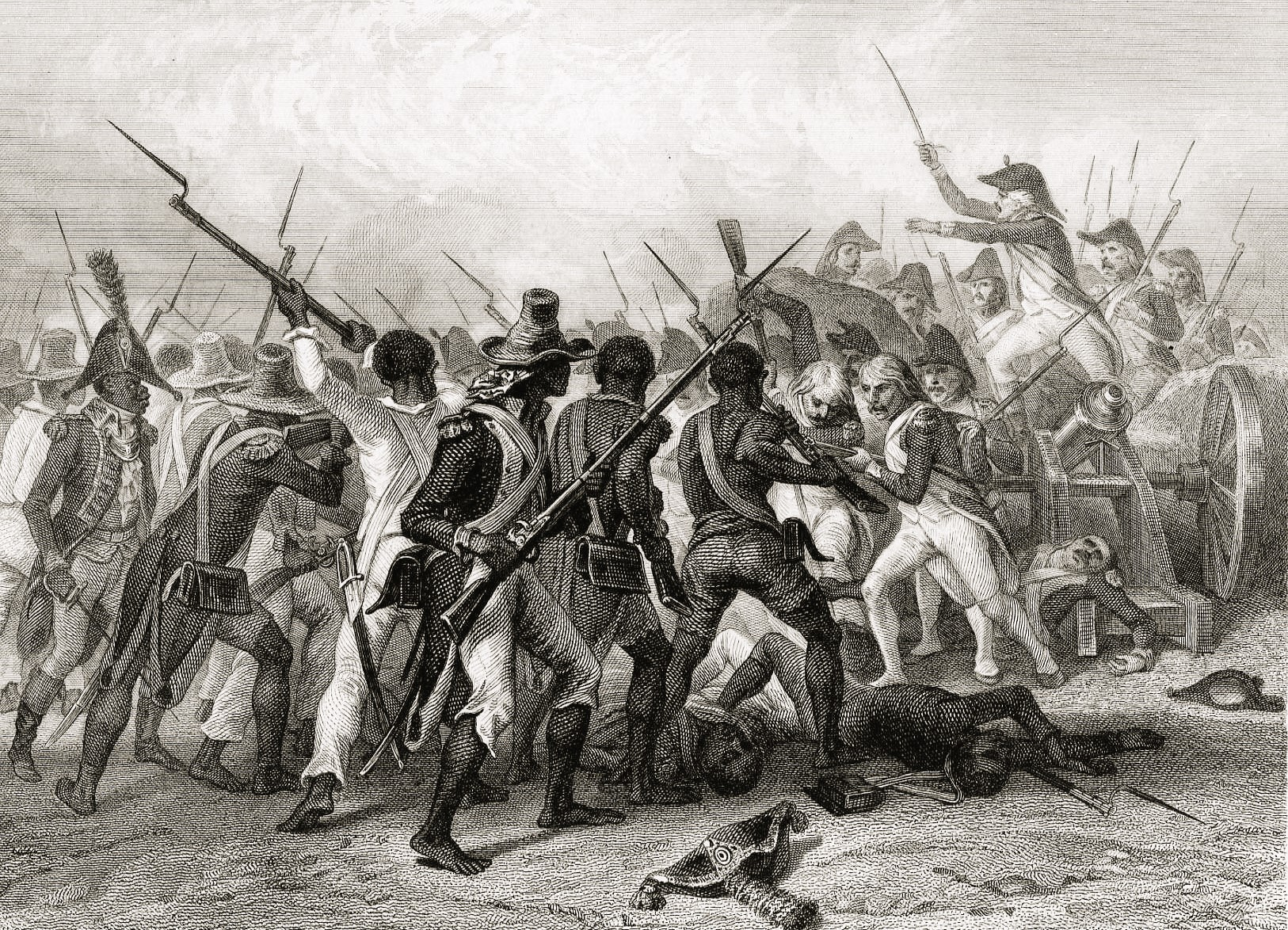
Illustration of 1802 Battle of Crête-à-Pierrot. The Haitian Revolution led to many French colonists fleeing to Puerto Rico.

The French immigration to Puerto Rico began as a result of economic and political conditions in places such as Louisiana (USA) and Saint-Domingue (Haiti). On the outbreak of the French and Indian War, also known as the Seven Years' War (1754–1763), between the Kingdom of Great Britain and its North American Colonies against France, many of the French settlers fled to Puerto Rico. In the 1791, Saint-Domingue (Haiti) uprising, slaves were organized into an army led by the self-appointed general Toussaint Louverture and rebelled against the French. The ultimate victory of the slaves over their white masters came about after the Battle of Vertières in 1803.

The French fled to Santo Domingo and made their way to Puerto Rico. Once there, they settled in the western region of the island in towns such as Mayagüez. With their expertise, they helped develop the island's sugar industry, converting Puerto Rico into a world leader in the exportation of sugar. French immigration from mainland France and its territories to Puerto Rico was the largest in number, second only to Spanish immigrants and today a great number of Puerto Ricans can claim French ancestry; 16 percent of the surnames on the island are either French or French-Corsican. Their influence in Puerto Rican culture is very much present and in evidence in the island's cuisine, literature and arts. The contributions of Puerto Ricans of French descent such as Manuel Gregorio Tavárez, Nilita Vientós Gastón and Fermín Tangüis can be found, but are not limited to, the fields of music, education and science.

=== Corsicans ===
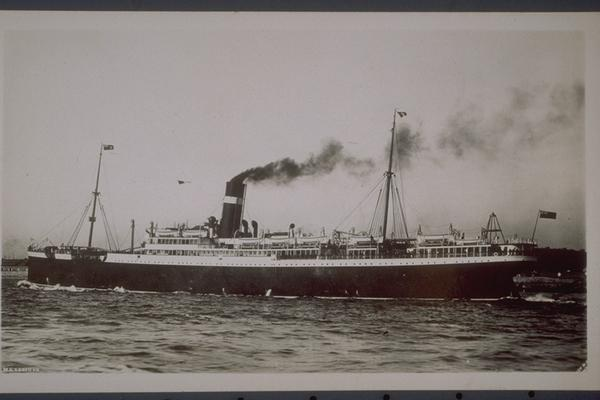
Type of steamship in which Corsicans arrived in Puerto Rico

The island of Puerto Rico is very similar in geography to the island of Corsica and therefore appealed to the many Corsicans who wanted to start a "new" life. Hundreds of Corsicans and their families immigrated to Puerto Rico from as early as 1830, and their numbers peaked in the early 1900s. The first Spanish settlers settled and owned the land in the coastal areas, the Corsicans tended to settle the mountainous southwestern region of the island, primarily in the towns of Adjuntas, Lares, Utuado, Ponce, Coamo, Yauco, Guayanilla and Guánica. However, it was Yauco whose rich agricultural area attracted the majority of the Corsican settlers. The three main crops in Yauco were coffee, sugar cane and tobacco. The new settlers dedicated themselves to the cultivation of these crops and within a short period of time some were even able to own and operate their own grocery stores. However, it was with the cultivation of the coffee bean that they would make their fortunes. The descendants of the Corsican settlers were also to become influential in the fields of education, literature, journalism and politics.

Today the town of Yauco is known as both the "Corsican Town" and "The Coffee Town". There's a memorial in Yauco with the inscription, "To the memory of our citizens of Corsican origin, France, who in the C19 became rooted in our village, who have enriched our culture with their traditions and helped our progress with their dedicated work - the municipality of Yauco pays them homage." The Corsican element of Puerto Rico is very much in evidence, Corsican surnames such as Paoli, Negroni and Fraticelli are common.

=== Germans ===
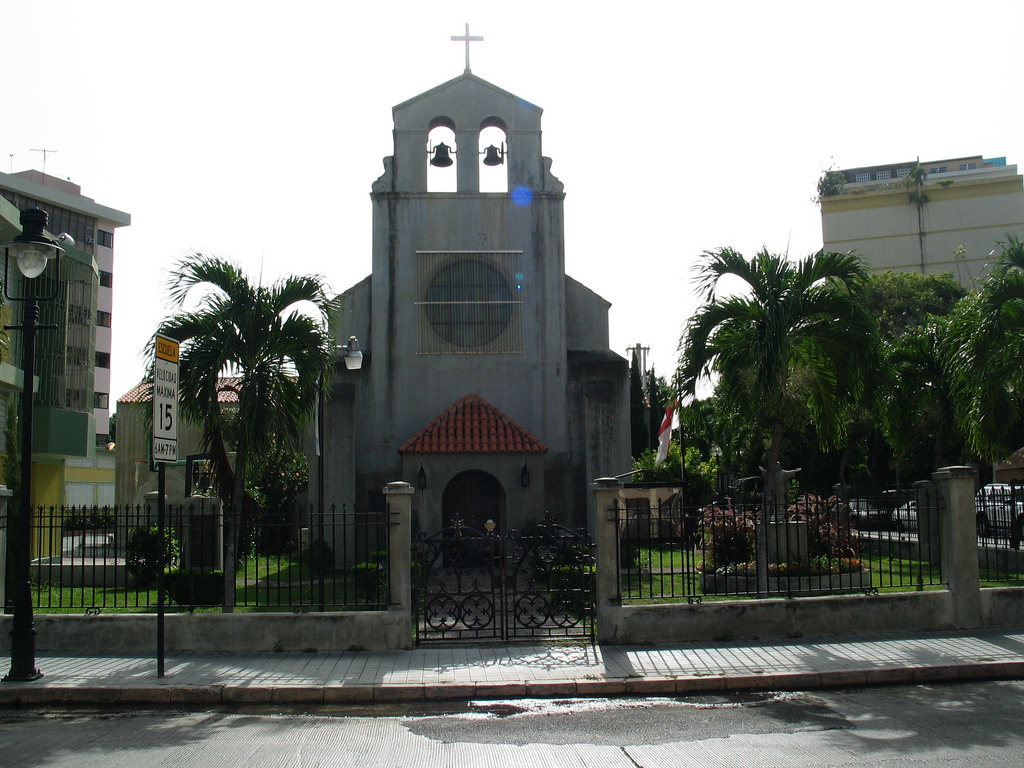
Iglesia Santísima Trinidad of Ponce

German immigrants arrived in Puerto Rico from Curaçao and Austria during the early 19th century. Many of these early German immigrants established warehouses and businesses in the coastal towns of Fajardo, Arroyo, Ponce, Mayagüez, Cabo Rojo and Aguadilla. One of the reasons that these businessman established themselves in the island was that Germany depended mostly on Great Britain for such products as coffee, sugar and tobacco. By establishing businesses dedicated to the exportation and importation of these and other goods, Germany no longer had to depend on British sellers for such goods. Not all immigrants were businessmen—some were teachers, farmers, and skilled laborers.

In Germany, the Revolutions of 1848 in the German states erupted, leading to the Frankfurt Parliament. Ultimately, the rather non-violent "revolution" failed. Disappointed, many Germans immigrated to the Americas and Puerto Rico, dubbed as the Forty-Eighters. The majority of these came from Alsace-Lorraine, Baden, Hesse, Rheinland and Württemberg. German immigrants were able to settle in the coastal areas and establish their businesses in towns such as Fajardo, Arroyo, Ponce, Mayagüez, Cabo Rojo and Aguadilla. Those who expected free land under the terms of the Spanish Royal Decree, settled in the central mountainous areas of the island in towns such as Adjuntas, Aibonito and Ciales among others. They made their living in the agricultural sector and in some cases became owners of sugar cane plantations. Others dedicated themselves to the fishing industry.

In 1870, the Spanish Courts passed the "Acta de Culto Condicionado" (Conditional Cult Act), a law granting the right of religious freedom to all those who wished to worship another religion other than the Catholic religion. The Anglican Church, the Iglesia Santísima Trinidad, was founded by German and English immigrants in Ponce in 1872. By the beginning of the 20th century, many of the descendants of the first German settlers had become successful businessmen, educators, and scientists and were among the pioneers of Puerto Rico's television industry. Among the successful businesses established by the German immigrants in Puerto Rico were Mullenhoff & Korber, Frite, Lundt & Co., Max Meyer & Co. and Feddersen Willenk & Co. Korber Group Inc. one of Puerto Rico's largest advertising agencies was founded by the descendants of William Korber.

=== Chinese ===
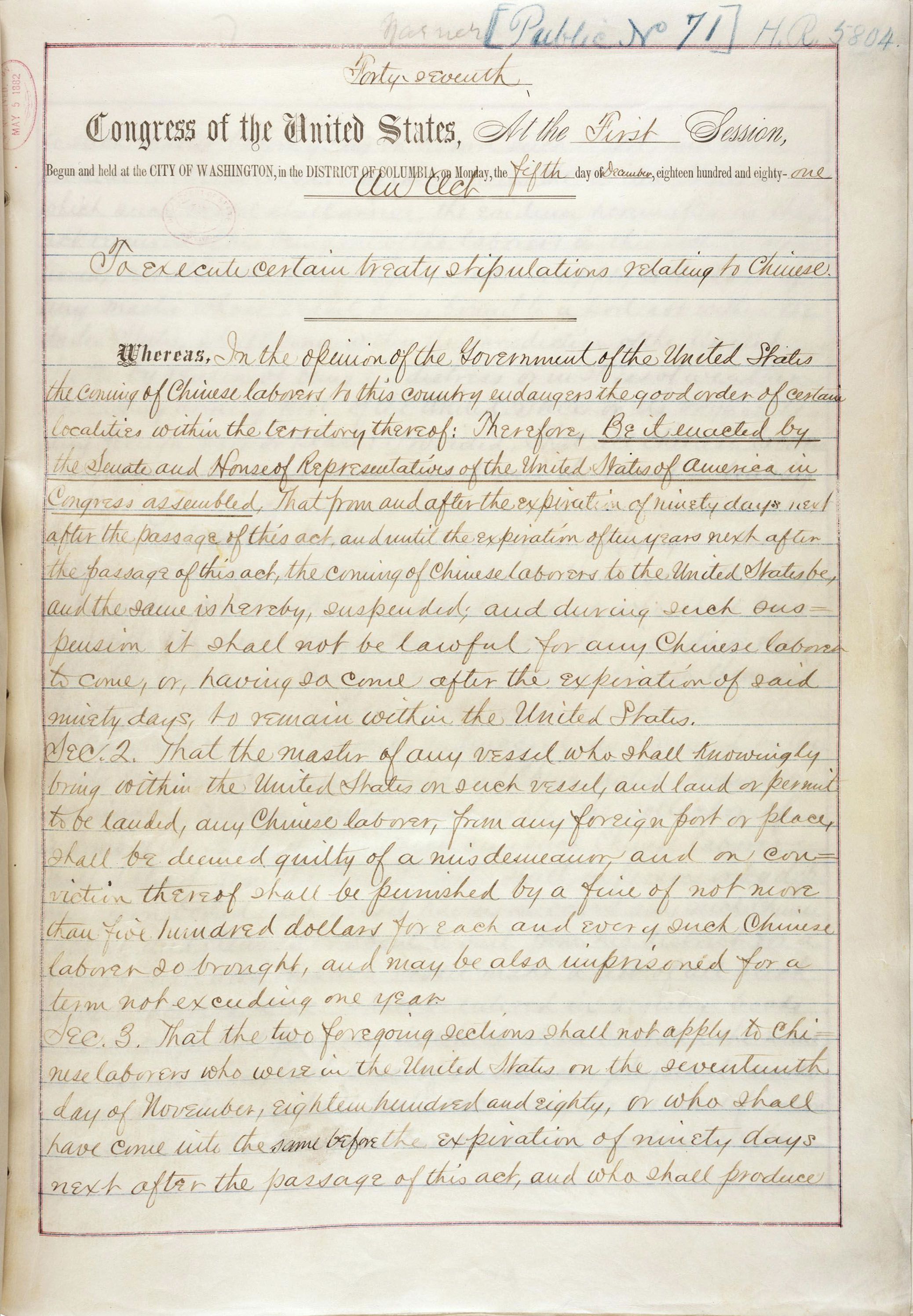
The first page of the Chinese Exclusion Act.

When the United States enacted the Chinese Exclusion Act on May 6, 1882, many Chinese in the United States fled to Puerto Rico, Cuba and other Latin American nations. They established small niches and worked in restaurants and laundries. The Chinese Exclusion Act was a United States federal law that suspended Chinese immigration. After the Spanish–American War, Spain ceded Puerto Rico to the United States under the conditions established by the Treaty of Paris of 1898. Chinese workers in the United States were allowed to travel to Puerto Rico. Some worked in the island's sugar industry, but most worked in re-building Puerto Rico's infrastructure and rail systems. Many of the workers in Puerto Rico decided to settle permanently in the island.

Various businesses are named "Los Chinos" (The Chinese) and a Valley in the town of Maunabo, Puerto Rico is called "Quebrada Los Chinos" (The Chinese Stream). The Padmasambhava Buddhist Center, whose followers practice Tibetan Buddhism, has a branch in Puerto Rico.

=== Jews ===
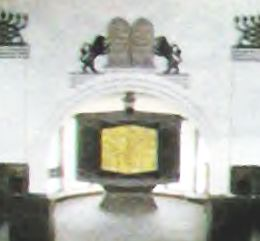
Inside Sha'are Zedeck

Even though the first Jews who arrived and settled in Puerto Rico were "Crypto-Jews" or "secret Jews", the Jewish community did not flourish in the island until after the Spanish–American War. Jewish-American soldiers were assigned to the military bases in Puerto Rico and many chose to stay and live on the island. Large numbers of Jewish immigrants began to arrive in Puerto Rico in the 1930s as refugees from Nazi occupied Europe. The majority settled in the island's capital, San Juan, where in 1942 they established the first Jewish Community Center of Puerto Rico. Puerto Rico is home to the largest and wealthiest Jewish community in the Caribbean with almost 3,000 Jewish inhabitants. Puerto Rican Jews have made many contributions to the Puerto Rican way of life. Their contributions can be found, but are not limited to, the fields of education, commerce and entertainment. Among many successful businesses they established are Supermercados Pueblo (Pueblo Supermarkets), Almacenes Kress (clothing store), Doral Bank, Pitusa and Me Salvé.

== Puerto Ricans with non-Hispanic surnames ==
The cultural impact that immigrants with ancestry from non-Hispanic countries have made in Puerto Rico is also apparent in the non-Hispanic surnames (whether paternal or maternal) of many Puerto Ricans and people of Puerto Rican descent. The following is a list solely of Puerto Ricans or people of Puerto Rican descent with non-Hispanic surnames and is not intended to reflect the ethnicity of the person listed. This list also includes people of Puerto Rican descent born in the United States and men and women who adopted Puerto Rico as their homeland. (Note: References of those listed with articles can be found within wikilinks to the subjects article. Notable Puerto Ricans or people of Puerto Rican descent listed without an article have a reference next to their name.)

=== Chinese origin ===
- Nero Chen – boxer.
- Julie Chu – ice hockey player; plays forward on the U.S. women's ice hockey team.
- Guanglou Cheng – inventor.
- Chris Moy – singer.

=== Corsican-Italian origin ===
- Ernesto Ramos Antonini – politician.
- Jaime Fuster Berlingeri – politician.
- Americo Boschetti – singer, composer.
- Mariana Bracetti – revolutionary.
- Kristina Brandi – tennis player.
- Giannina Braschi – poet and novelist.
- Mayra Calvani – author.
- Luisa Capetillo – labor leader.
- Vicente Carattini – singer and composer.
- Tony Croatto – singer.
- Carmen Delia Dipiní – singer.
- Carmen Dominicci – journalist.
- Fernando L. Ribas-Dominicci – military.
- Jorge Farinacci – politician.
- Eduardo Georgetti – sugar baron, politician.
- Mihiel Gilormini – military.
- Andrés Mignucci – architect.
- Antonio Mignucci – marine biologist.
- Héctor Andrés Negroni – military historian.
- Joe Negroni – singer.
- Manuel Olivieri Sanchez – Civil rights activist.
- Charlie Palmieri – bandleader.
- Eddie Palmieri – bandleader.
- Antonio Paoli – opera singer.
- Juan Manuel García Passalacqua – political analyst/commentator.
- Pedro Pierluisi – politician.
- Pedro Pietri – poet.
- Francisco Rojas Tollinchi – poet, civic leader and journalist.
- Jorge Santini – Mayor of San Juan.
- Chay Santini – model.
- José Semidei Rodríguez – military.
- Gerardo Teissonniere – pianist.
- Carlos Vivoni – politician
- Miguel Vivoni – politician.
- Pedro Santos Vivoni – politician, Mayor.
- Pierre Vivoni – Judge.
- José Antonio Vivoni Ramírez de Arellano – politician, mayor.
- Enrique Vivoni Farage – Professor at UPR School of Architecture and historian.

=== Czech origin ===
- Chris Kubecka – (full name Christina Kubecka de Medina), a Computer Scientist specialist in cyberwarfare.

=== French origin ===
- Rafael Alers – musician, founder/conductor of a symphonic orchestra, and composer.
- Adrienne Bailon – actress.
- Alejandrina Benítez de Gautier – poet.
- Río Piedras massacre#Aftermath – Puerto Rican nationalist.
- Pedro Beauchamp – Surgeon.
- Carlos Beltrán – sportsperson.
- David "Quique" Bernier – politician, sportsperson.
- Giselle Blondet – actress.
- Anthony M. Busquets – scientist.
- Nydia Caro – singer.
- Carlos E. Chardón – educator and scientist.
- Evaristo Ribera Chevremont – poet.
- Catalino "Tite" Curet Alonso – Ballad and salsa composer.
- Sylvia del Villard – entertainer.
- Nelson Antonio Denis – politician and writer.
- Rene Farrait – singer.
- José Gautier Benítez – poet.
- Ana Roque Geigel de Duprey – activist, educator.
- Joyce Giraud – actress.
- Miguel Godreau – actor, choreographer.
- Nidia Guenard – professional wrestler.
- Luis Guinot Jr. – Ambassador.
- Antulio Segarra Guiot – military.
- Rafael Ithier – musician.
- Carmen Jovet – journalist.
- Juan Laporte – boxer.
- Michele LaFountain – journalist.
- Enrique Laguerre – writer.
- George Lamond – singer.
- Eva LaRue – actress.
- Teófilo José Jaime María Le Guillou – military.
- Juan Ramón Loubriel – sportsperson.
- Marisol Malaret – Miss Universe (1970).
- René Marqués – writer and playwright.
- Teófilo Marxuach Plumey – military.
- René Monclova – actor and comedian.
- Yolandita Monge – singer.
- Gilberto Monroig – bolero singer.
- Glenn Monroig – composer, singer.
- Joaquin Mouliert – musician.
- Francheska Pellot – entrepreneur.
- Victor Pellot – sportsperson.
- Rafael Pérez Perry – businessman.
- Luis Rayffer – physician
- Felisa Rincón de Gautier – politician.
- Fernando and Nefty Sallaberry – singers.
- Joe Sánchez Picon – police officer and author.
- Evelyn Souffront – singer.
- Fermín Tangüis – businessman and scientist.
- Manuel Gregorio Tavárez – composer.
- Nilita Vientós Gastón – educator.
- Luis Vigoreaux – TV producer and host.
- Luisito Vigoreaux – TV producer and host.
- Roberto Vigoreaux – former senator.

=== German origin ===
- Salvador Brau – sociologist, historian, novelist, and playwright.
- Severo Colberg Ramírez – politician.
- Jorge Colberg Toro – politician.
- Severo Colberg Toro – politician.
- Federico Degetau – politician.
- Sixto González – scientist.
- Ivonne Goderich – actress.
- Alfred D. Herger – television show host.
- Hans Hertell – former U.S. Ambassador to the Dominican Republic.
- Erwin Kiess – politician.
- Henry Klumb – architect.
- Erick Kolthoff-Benners – judge.
- Erick Kolthoff – Puerto Rico Supreme Court Justice.
- William Korber – businessman.
- Franz von Kupferschein (1751–1814) – father of the Puerto Rican pirate Roberto Cofresí y Ramírez de Arellano. He was baptized as Francesco Giuseppe Fortunato von Kupferschein.
- Andrés G. Luhring – architect.
- Wolfgang-Felix Magath – soccer player and coach.
- George E. Mayer – military.
- Jose Arnaldo Meyners – Journalist.
- Edward G. Miller, Jr. – lawyer.
- Irene Miller-Rodriguez – military
- Orvil Miller – actor and musician.
- Virgil R. Miller – military.
- Nicholasa Mohr – writer.
- Henry Neumann – politician.
- Isabel Luberza Oppenheimer – also known as "Isabel la Negra".
- Freddie Prinze – actor.
- Freddie Prinze, Jr. – actor.
- Jorge Raschke – evangelist.
- Kimberly "Kimmie" Raschke – politician.
- Carlos Vélez Rieckehoff – Puerto Rican nationalist.
- Germán Rieckehoff Sampayo – sportsperson.
- Frederick Lois Riefkohl – military.
- Rudolph W. Riefkohl – military.
- William Riefkohl – politician.
- Julita Ross – singer.
- Thomas Rivera Schatz – politician.
- Ursula Schmidt Acosta – educator and genealogist.
- Edna Schmidt – journalist.
- Waldemar Schmidt – boxing referee.
- Arturo Alfonso Schomburg – historian.
- Larry Seilhamer Rodríguez – politician.
- Agustín Stahl – scientist.
- Dickie Thon baseball player
- Luis R. Esteves Völckers – military.
- Ursula Von Eckhardt – columnist.
- Mark Watring – sportsperson.
- Alfredo Wiechers – architect.
- Lila Mayoral Wirshing – First Lady of Puerto Rico from 1973-1977 and 1985-1993.
- Hermán Wirshing – sugarcane baron.
- Hermán José Wirshing – U.S. Marshal in Puerto Rico.

=== Irish-English-Scottish origin ===
- Deborah Carthy-Deu – Miss Universe 1985.
- José Miguel Class – singer.
- Judith Ortiz Cofer – author.
- Benjamín Cole – politician
- Miguel Conboy – Founder of the Puerto Rican tobacco trade.
- Howie Dorough – singer.
- Faith Evans – U.S. Marshal.
- Victoria Justice – actress.
- Kevin Kelley – boxer.
- Juan Kennedy – slave trader.
- Mike Lowell – MLB player.
- Desiree Lowry – Miss Puerto Rico (1995).
- Kenneth McClintock – politician.
- Scotty McCreery – country singer.
- Julia Migenes-Johnson – Soprano.
- Demetrio O'Daly – military and politician.
- Rafael O'Ferrall – military.
- Ana María O'Neill – educator, author and advocate of women's rights.
- Héctor O'Neill García – politician and Mayor.
- María de Mater O'Neill – artist, lithographer, and professor.
- Ada Perkins Flores – Miss Puerto Rico (1978).
- Ramón Power y Giralt – military and politician.
- Carmen Belén Richardson – actress.
- Sharon Riley – actress/singer.
- Elizabeth Robinson – Miss Puerto Rico (1986).
- James Rockwell – military.
- Herb Scannell – businessman.
- Laurie Tamara Simpson – Miss Puerto Rico (1987).
- Roberto Clemente Walker – baseball player.
- Otilio "Bizcocho" Warrington – comedian and actor.
- Bernie Williams – former MLB player.

=== Jewish origin ===
- Quiara Alegría Hudes – author, playwright.
- Axel Anderson – actor/director
- Jorge Artime – businessman founder of Almacenes Kress.
- Yosef Ben-Jochannan – Writer and historian.
- David Blaine – magician.
- Mathias Brugman – revolutionary.
- Max Goldman – Civil Rights Commission.
- David Helfeld – educator.
- Julio Kaplan – chess player.
- Israel Kopel – businessman, founder of Almacenes Pitusa department stores.
- Raphy Leavitt – bandleader and composer.
- Manny Lehman – DJ and producer.
- Aurora Levins Morales – author, poet
- Hila Levy – served in the military.
- Teresa Levy – educator and author.
- Ari Meyers – actress.
- Micol Ostow – author.
- Jorge Seijo – radio and television personality.
- Brenda K. Starr – "salsa" singer.
- Aaron Cecil Snyder – Chief Justice of the Supreme Court of Puerto Rico.
- Nina Tassler – President of CBS Entertainment.
- Rachel Ticotin – actress.
- Sahaj Ticotin – vocalist/guitarist.
- George and Harold Toppel – businessmen, founders of Supermercados Pueblo (Pueblo Supermarkets).

=== Lebanese origin ===
- Tony Fas Alzamora – politician.
- Eudaldo Báez Galib – politician.

== See also ==
- Puerto Rico
- List of Puerto Ricans
- History of women in Puerto Rico
- Culture of Puerto Rico
- Cultural diversity in Puerto Rico
  - Chinese immigration to Puerto Rico
  - Corsican immigration to Puerto Rico
  - French immigration to Puerto Rico
  - German immigration to Puerto Rico
  - Irish immigration to Puerto Rico
  - Jewish immigration to Puerto Rico
  - Royal Decree of Graces of 1815
- Art in Puerto Rico
- Cinema of Puerto Rico
- Cuisine of Puerto Rico
- Puerto Rican literature
- Music of Puerto Rico
- Sports in Puerto Rico
- Crypto-Judaism
