= Caribbean Manatee Conservation Center =

Organization to help endangered manatees

- Abbreviation: CMCC or CCMC (in Spanish)
- Formation: 2009
- Type: Partnership between 501(c)(3) non-profit Red Caribeña de Varamientos (Caribbean Stranding Network) and the Inter American University of Puerto Rico
- Purpose: Rescue, rehabilitation, population research and community outreach regarding endangered manatees
- Location: Bayamón, Puerto Rico
- Coordinates: 18°21′02″N 66°10′54″W
- Region served: Caribbean, particularly Puerto Rico
- Director: Antonio Mignucci
- Website: manatipr.org

The Caribbean Manatee Conservation Center is a research, education, rescue, and rehabilitation partnership established in 2009 in the Caribbean island of Puerto Rico in order to help endangered manatees survive from extinction.

== Endangered manatees ==
Caribbean manatees (Trichechus manatus) are a tropical marine mammal threatened from survival throughout their range in the United States (US), Mexico, Caribbean Sea, Central and South America. It is highly endangered in the Commonwealth of Puerto Rico, mostly by human causes in the form of poaching and watercraft mortality. While over 4,800 manatees are left in Florida, less than 700 survive in Puerto Rico. Manatees used to be hunted in Puerto Rico's coasts, but are now directly threatened by habitat degradation, speeding boats and jet skis. Indirect threats also include a low reproductive rate, genetic bottleneck and low diversity, lack of immigration of adjacent populations, and exposure to adverse coastal health.

If manatees are to survive in Puerto Rico, all stakeholders, including government, academia, environmental non-governmental organizations (NGOs), local corporations and all island residents in general, must work together and actively participate in positive actions of management, research, and community involvement that would enhance the survival of the species and preserve them for future generations.

== History ==
As a response to this needed effort, the NGO Red Caribeña de Varamientos (Caribbean Stranding Network) partnered with the Inter American University of Puerto Rico to implement research, rescue, rehabilitation, and community outreach programs for manatee conservation through the establishment of the Caribbean Manatee Conservation Center (CMCC). It was previously known as the Puerto Rico Manatee Conservation Center. Through a long-term cooperative agreement, permits and licenses from Puerto Rico Department of Natural and Environmental Resources (PRDNER), US Fish and Wildlife Service (USFWS) and US Animal and Plant Health Inspection Service, the Network and the university slated academic programs to support research and conservation work in the PRMCC with the participation of students and faculty, as well as the means of seeking funds available to academia and community-based organizations to support the manatee conservation initiatives.

While this conservation effort is focused on manatees in Puerto Rico, the CMCC also assists in programs for West Indian manatees in the British Virgin Islands, Cayman Islands, Colombia, Cuba, Dominican Republic, Guatemala, Mexico, Panama, Turks and Caicos, Guyana, and Venezuela, and for endangered sister species, such as the Amazonian manatee (Trichechus inunguis) in Colombia and Peru, and the West African manatee (Trichechus senegalensis) in Taiwan, Nigeria, and Gabon, Africa. These international partnerships have taken the CMCC's scientists, veterinarians, and technicians around the globe to provide assistance and support in rescue, rehabilitation, and population research projects.

== Conservation initiatives ==
PRMCC implements manatee conservation initiatives in four main fronts or programs:

1. Rescue and stranding response,
2. Rehabilitation and veterinary care,
3. Population research, and
4. Community outreach and education.

=== Rescue and stranding response ===
Up to 15 cases of stranded manatees are reported in Puerto Rico each year. Some of these cases involve animals that have died near shore, either from natural causes or human-related accidents. Other cases reported consist of live manatees, whether ill, injured, or orphaned in need of veterinary attention. The PRMCC is deputized by both the Commonwealth and Federal governments to respond to these stranding events, and conduct an investigation on the cause of death, including a necropsy, or rescue and transport the live animal to the PRMCC's rehabilitation facility for veterinary treatment and care.

Through dedicated stranding and mortality research and monitoring, the PRMCC has documented over 120 manatee deaths in Puerto Rico, via salvage and necropsies. Pathology and disease processes in these cases have been documented cooperatively with veterinary pathologists and manatee biologists of the US Geological Survey (USGS) Sirenia Project in Gainesville, Florida. Since 2015, over 12 successful rescues were conducted in Puerto Rico.

=== Rehabilitation and veterinary care ===
Manatee being rescued in Rio Grande, Puerto Rico.

The CMCC is one of the 12 facilities federally deputized in the US to hold and care for manatees and one of five critical care manatees facilities. These facilities conform the Manatee Rescue and Rehabilitation Partnership, which includes the following organizations: Cincinnati Zoo, Columbus Zoo, Disney Worldwide Conservation Fund, Florida Fish and Wildlife Conservation Commission, Homosassa Springs State Wildlife Park, Hubbs-SeaWorld Research Institute, Jacksonville Zoo and Gardens, Miami Seaquarium, Mote Marine Laboratory, Caribbean Manatee Conservation Center, Save the Manatee Club, Clearwater Marine Aquarium, Sea World Orlando, South Florida Museum, Tampa's Lowry Park Zoo, USFWS, USGS Sirenia Project, University of Florida's College of Veterinary Medicine, and Walt Disney World's The Seas.

As one of the critical care authorized facilities, the CMCC receives ill, injured, or orphaned manatees and provides them with veterinary treatment and rehabilitation care with the main purpose of returning them back to their habitat once they have been cleared of their admission condition and can survive on their own.

A team of experienced marine biologists, veterinarians, veterinary technicians, and caretakers with the help of volunteers, provide treatment and care around-the-clock on a full-time basis. Some cases only require minor treatment, while others, particularly orphaned calves, require up to three years of care at the CMCC, and one-year monitoring in the wild.

Since 1989, the CMCC has tended over 45 rescue and rehabilitation cases of manatees in Puerto Rico, and offered assistance to more than two dozen cases in the Caribbean (British Virgin Islands, Cayman Islands, Colombia, Cuba, Dominican Republic, Guatemala, Guyana, Mexico, Turks and Caicos, and Venezuela), the Amazon (Peru and Colombia), Taiwan and Gabon and Nigeria, Africa. In Puerto Rico, four manatees have been immediately released after the rescue, seven have been released after rehabilitation (Moisés, Rafael, Tuque, Aramaná, Yuisa, Tureyguá, and Mabo) and four are at present in rehabilitation (Guacara, Loíza, Taicaraya, Bajarí). Guacara, originally from Florida, but now a permanent resident of the CMCC, can not be released back to the wild due to floatability problems caused by a boat injury to its right lung in 2008.

=== Population research ===
Research on the ecology, life history, genetics, distribution, habitat use, and movement of the manatee population in Puerto Rico have been conducted over the past years in a local, national and international cooperative fashion, particularly with colleagues from the USGS Sirenia Project, North Carolina State University, and Universidad de los Andes (Colombia). These efforts have resulted in an edited book (Sirenian Conservation: Issues and strategies in developing countries), and over 80 joint publications, analyzing major causes affecting the survival of this species. Some of the most recent peer-reviewed publications in which the PRMCC has participated are:

- Acoustical and anatomical determination of sound production and transmission in West Indian (Trichechus manatus) and Amazonian (T. inunguis) manatees.
- Genital papillomatosis associated with two novel mucosotropic papillomaviruses from a Florida manatee (Trichchus manatus latirostris).
- Phylogeography and sex-biased dispersal across riverine manatee populations (Trichechus inunguis and Trichechus manatus) in South America.
- Disseminated toxoplasmosis in Antillean manatees Trichchus manatus manatus from Puerto Rico.
- Puerto Rico and Florida manatees represent genetically distinct groups.
- Manatees rescue, rehabilitation and release efforts as a tool for species conservation.
- Sirenian pathology and mortality assessment.
- The role of scientists in sirenian conservation in developing countries.
- West Indian manatees (Trichechus manatus) in the Wider Caribbean Region.
- IUCN Red List of Threatened Species: Trichechus manatus.
- Evidence of a shark attack on a West Indian manatee (Trichechus manatus) in Puerto Rico.
- Manatee mortality in Puerto Rico.

The new frontier in manatee research pivots on population health assessment and habitat use through the use of radio-telemetry. Thus, in the coming years, the CMCC will focus its research on manatees through cooperative projects of health assessment, telemetry, genetics, and aerial surveys. Since detrimental activities that have led to the manatee endangerment include habitat degradation, which in turn influences manatee health and the particular use of specific habitats, the CMCC seeks to ascertain the effects of these factors in the survival of the manatee in Puerto Rico.

=== Community outreach and education ===
Extensive community outreach efforts have also been a priority for the CMCC, including the education of school children and the general public, and the production of brochures and posters for free distribution. Two books for young children have been printed in 2010 and 2011, educating about the plight for survival of manatees in Caribbean waters.

- Aunque viva en el agua.
- El manatí de Puerto Rico.

New educational material for children as well as for boaters, kayakers, divers and jetskiers, is being produced in a cooperative effort with sister organizations. Additional educational material is also available for teachers and can be downloaded for the general public on the CMCC's website www.manatipr.org.

A public service announcement (PSA) campaign in the two major local newspapers (El Nuevo Día and Primera Hora) is also used to make the community aware of the need of conservation efforts for manatees in the island.

Through CMCC's encouragement and active campaign, Puerto Rico's government declared by law in 2013 that the manatee would be the National Mammal of the Commonwealth of Puerto Rico and assigned each year 7 September as the "Day for Caribbean Manatee Conservation" in the island. This designation through Law 127 of 31 October 2013 is the first official designation of a national wildlife symbol for Puerto Rico. During its first and second celebration in 2013 and 2014, over 50 schools and 20,000 students celebrated 7 September as "manatee day" with environmental activities, talks, and the writing of advocacy letters to help in manatee conservation in the island. During the week of 7 September 2015, the PRMCC together with some 300 elementary and secondary school teachers, impacted over 45,000 students on the island regarding the manatee's plight for survival and the need for conservation measures to prevent their extinction.

Part of CMCC's community outreach efforts include involving students as volunteers, and inviting college interns to practice and gain experience in marine wildlife conservation initiatives at the CMCC. Biology, marine sciences, and environmental sciences students participate in the daily activities of CMCC, including husbandry, veterinary care, scientific research, conservation, and community outreach and education. Over 90 volunteers and interns are associated with the CMCC's activities, learning first hand on manatee conservation. The CMCC also arranges for its technicians and volunteers to gain experience in internships abroad with collaborative institutions in the US and throughout Latin America.

The CMCC is also a facility where elementary, middle and high school children, university students, as well as the public and tourists may visit to observe first hand the research and rehabilitation work in a way to inspire them to get involved in environmental conservation through community service. Over 10,000 visitors come through CMCC each year to receive a short lecture on manatee conservation and see the work behind the scenes to help this species survive.

News media, TV and newspapers, regularly cover CMCC's conservation activities and progress of manatee patients under veterinary care. As a result of this coverage and CMCC's community outreach efforts, the US Environmental Protection Agency awarded the Network the "Environmental Quality Award" in 2004. National Geographic documented their work for the television series Earth Pulse, which aired worldwide in 2002 and 2003. In 2012, the syndicated ABC television program Ocean Mysteries with Jeff Corwin filmed CMCC's manatee conservation efforts, and the episode aired to 1.5 million viewers in the US in March 2013. In 2014, Windfall Films recorded a section for the PBS and England's Channel 4 program "Born in the Wild" featuring CMCC's work on manatee calf rearing. The episode was seen during the summer of 2014 by some 821,000 viewers in the United Kingdom, and over 1.2 million viewers in the US. In 2017, PBS TV and BBC TV presented two documentaries ("Viva Puerto Rico" and "Puerto Rico: Island of Enchantment") which included and showcased the work of the CMCC, with a TV audience of over 5 million viewers. In 2020, the documentary was re-transmitted in Spanish by Animal Planet.

== Infrastructure ==
The CMCC was conceived to include a state-of-the-art facility dedicated to conduct research, rescue, rehabilitation and community outreach programs for this endangered marine species to further their conservation, health, and well-being. The facility was designed by architect Andrés Mignucci to consist of a series of laboratories and tanks to run PRMCC's programs.

The laboratories include spaces for marine research, veterinary treatment, telemetry, osteological collection, animal food preparation, as well as offices for program coordinators. The rehabilitation area consists of 9 tanks. The tanks and filter system, totaling some 80,000 gallons of fresh-water, can accommodate 5 adult manatees and 10 calves in rehabilitation. The life support building contains 17 commercial rapid-sand filters and IntelliFlo pumps that process all water every 50 minutes allowing for excellent water quality that it is both healthy for the manatees and adequate for public viewing. A 2-ton, 16-foot mast, 16-feet jib crane sits between the calf and medical tanks to weigh and move animals.

The CMCC also has a 26-foot tunnel-hull capture boat, two pick-up trucks and a rescue truck for manatee rescues and field research.

The facility's first and second phases were constructed between 2010 and 2012 with funding from the Puerto Rico Legislature, the Inter American University, National Fish and Wildlife Foundation, and through donations from over 25 corporation and foundations.

== Capital improvement plan ==
The CMCC, through its founding partners (Caribbean Stranding Network and the Inter American University of Puerto Rico), is committed to enhancing implementing research, rescue, rehabilitation, and community outreach programs for manatee conservation. A capital improvement plan has been slated by the PRMCC and includes development steps for (1) Financing the yearly operation of the CMCC; (2) Completing the infrastructure of rehabilitation tanks for better functioning, including a false floor in the medical tank, automatic chlorination, and an ozone filtration system; (3) Constructing Phase 3 of the PRMCC, including laboratories, veterinary clinic, husbandry areas, and a community outreach room to receive the general public; and (4) Refurbishing quarantine tanks and constructing aquaculture ponds for the aquaponic cultivation of aquatic plants (water hyacinths and water thyme) that will serve as food for the manatees in rehabilitation in a sustainable manner.

Those corporations, agencies, foundations, or institutions that participate in this capital improvement plan become what the CMCC calls Amigos del Manatí (friend of the manatee), a way for them to show corporate social responsibility and environmental stewardship.

== The Caribbean Stranding Network as a non-profit ==
The Caribbean Stranding Network is duly registered in the Commonwealth's State and Treasury departments as a non-profit organization. It is deputized by the Commonwealth and Federal wildlife government agencies to rescue and rehabilitate these endangered species. The Network is run by an executive director overseen by a board of directors. The Network staff that operates the PRMCC is composed of the director, veterinarians, program coordinators, technicians, and volunteers.

The Network, a 501(c)(3) tax-exempt organization, finances its conservation efforts through donations from private corporations, Puerto Rico Legislature Community Funds, and limited endangered species funds from the Commonwealth and Federal governments. In-kind donations from several key corporations have been crucial in allowing the Network and the PRMCC to continue its conservation efforts.

== The Inter American University ==
The Inter American University of Puerto Rico is a private non-profit university founded in 1912 and dedicated to uniting academic excellence with leadership and service to society. The university has 11 university campuses throughout Puerto Rico accredited by the Middle States Association of Colleges and Schools, including schools of law, optometry and aeronautics, and three college-preparatory schools. The Bayamón campus, where the PRMCC is located, is a sciences and engineering-oriented campus, now featuring a bachelor's degree in marine sciences and a master's degree in biology.

The governing body of the university is its Board of Trustees, which perpetuates itself and whose members are elected freely without interference from any external authority. The president of the university is the executive officer and senior scholar at the Institution. Chancellors lead each campus of the university system.

The Inter American University of Puerto Rico is one of the largest private universities in Puerto Rico and the Caribbean, with a student body of 42,000.
