= Jesús Eduardo Amaral =

Puerto Rican architect and educator

Jesús Eduardo Amaral FAIA
- Born: 1927; Humacao, Puerto Rico
- Died: September 9, 2020 (aged 92–93); San Juan, Puerto Rico
- Occupation: Architect
- Awards: Fellow of the American Institute of Architects (1978), Henry Klumb Award (1985), Honoris Causa Doctorate, Polythecnic University of Puerto Rico (2000)
- Practice: Amaral y Morales (1956-1969), J.E. Amaral Arquitectos (1969-1994)
- Buildings: Condominio Universitario, Río Piedras, Puerto Rico, Hotel Delicias, Fajardo, Puerto Rico, School of Law, Interamerican University, San Juan, Puerto Rico.

Jesús Eduardo Amaral FAIA (1927 – September 9, 2020) was a Puerto Rican architect and educator. As partner in the firm Amaral y Morales, he produced some of Puerto Rico's most notable modern architecture primarily from 1950 to 1970. He was the founder and first head of the School of Architecture of the University of Puerto Rico (1966–1969).

== Biography ==
Amaral was born in 1927 in Humacao, Puerto Rico. He studied civil engineering (1948) and architecture (1951) at Cornell University College of Architecture, Art, and Planning in Ithaca, NY. With architect Efrer Morales (1928–1992) he formed Amaral y Morales (1956–1969), one of Puerto Rico's pioneering modern firms. In 1966 he founded the School of Architecture of the University of Puerto Rico, the island's first architecture school. He was both President of Puerto Rico's Institute of Architects, as well as President of the Puerto Rico Chapter of the American Institute of Architects. He was elevated to the American Institute of Architects' College of Fellows in 1978. He was the recipient of the Henry Klumb Award in 1985. In 2000 he was given a Honoris Causa Doctorate by the Polytechnic University of Puerto Rico.

Some of his most significant buildings include the Condominio Universitario, Condominio Costa Azul, the Hotel Delicias, the Mater Salvatoris College in Guaynabo and the School of Law at the Interamerican University in San Juan, Puerto Rico.

In 2011, the Colegio de Arquitectos y Arquitectos Paisajistas de Puerto Rico published the monographic book "Jesús Eduardo Amaral, Arquitecto" written by Andrés Mignucci FAIA.

Jesús Eduardo Amaral died on September 9, 2020, in San Juan, Puerto Rico.
