= Irish immigration to Puerto Rico =

Aspect of Puerto Rican history

Irish immigration to Puerto Rico (Spanish: Puertorriqueños irlandeses) began during the 16th century after the Spanish had colonized the island and has continued to the present day. During the 1500s, several Irish mercenaries in English service deserted and fled to the Spanish Empire, some of whom made their way to Puerto Rico. Many of these Irishmen served in the Spanish garrison on Puerto Rico, settling down, establishing families and integrating into the local community. During the 17th and 18th centuries, several Irish military officers and colonial officials in Spanish service, such as Alejandro O'Reilly, were sent to Puerto Rico, further boosting the Irish community in the colony. By the end of the 18th century, a steady level of immigration resulted in a sizeable Irish community in Puerto Rico.

During the French Revolutionary Wars, all Irish people were temporarily expelled from Puerto Rico as a result of a decree issued by Governor Ramón de Castro y Gutiérrez. Castro had received news of the British capture of Trinidad, and grew suspicious of all English-speakers in the colony. As a result, the Irish and British communities in Puerto Rico were rounded up, imprisoned and deported by Spanish colonial authorities. The expulsion of the Irish proved immensely controversial and eventually most of them discreetly returned to the island. In 1815, the government of Spain issued the Royal Decree of Graces, which aimed to encourage Europeans to settle in Puerto Rico and thereby blunt movements for independence in the colony.

Many Irish who fled their homeland because of the Great Famine of the 1840s (over one million people died as a result of this famine) immigrated to the United States. A significant number of them went to Puerto Rico after being turned away at American ports because of epidemic outbreaks on board the ships on which they sailed. Many of these Irish settlers were instrumental in the development of the island's hugely successful sugar industry. This industry was vital to the growing local economy. After Puerto Rico was ceded to the United States by Spain as a consequence of the Spanish–American War in 1898, many US soldiers of Irish-American ancestry were stationed in the island. They met members of the population who were island-born and Irish-descended. These soldiers stayed in Puerto Rico where they were quickly incorporated into the Irish, non-Irish, and native communities throughout the island. The Irish influence in Puerto Rico is not limited to their contributions to the island's agricultural industry; they have also influenced the fields of education, the arts and sciences, and politics.

== Irish in the service of Spain ==
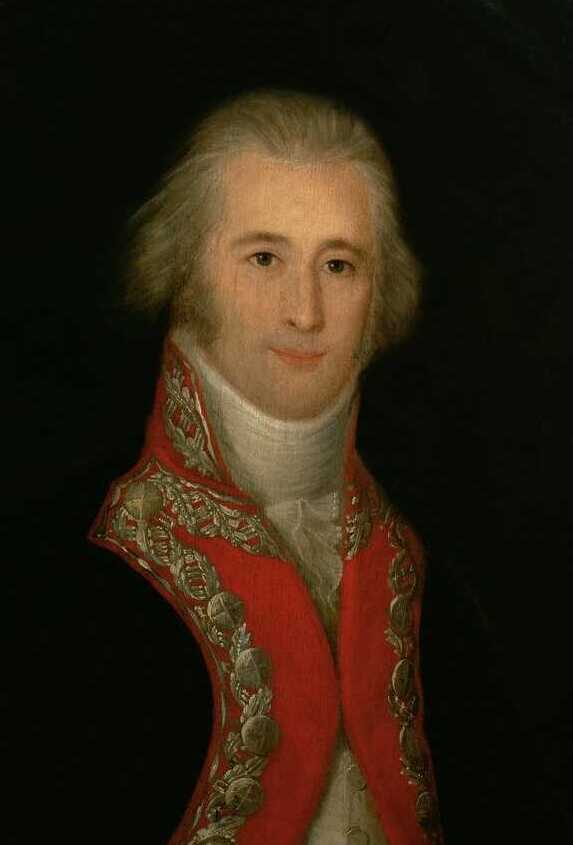
Alejandro O'Reilly

During the 16th century, Tudor conquest of Ireland resulted in the island falling under English rule as the Lordship of Ireland. Over the course of the 1580s, English army officer Sir William Stanley recruited hundreds of Irish rebels as mercenaries who were sent to fight in the Low Countries as part of the Eighty Years' War. However, in 1587 Stanley surrendered Deventer to Spanish forces and defected, with many of his Irish troops defecting alongside him. These Irishmen began serving in the Spanish army and some eventually made their way to Spain's colonies in the Americas, including Puerto Rico.

== 18th century ==
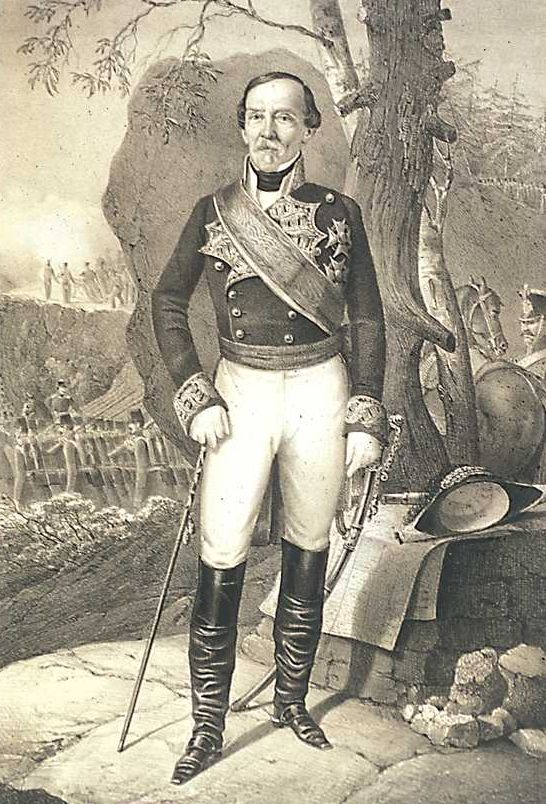
Demetrio O'Daly

In 1765, the King of Spain, Carlos III, sent Field Marshal Alejandro O'Reilly to the Captaincy General of Puerto Rico to assess the state of the defenses of that colony. O'Reilly took a very complete census of the island and recommended numerous reforms, including the instilling of strict military discipline in the local troops. He also insisted that the men serving in the defense of the realm receive their pay regularly and directly rather than indirectly from their commanding officers, a long-standing practice that had led to abuses.

Some of O'Reilly's other recommendations resulted in a massive twenty-year program of modernizing San Felipe del Morro Castle in San Juan, now a World Heritage Site.

The training that he instituted was to bring fame and glory to the Puerto Rican militia some thirty years later, during the British invasion of Puerto Rico in 1797. Field Marshal O'Reilly's civilian militia had become known as the "Disciplined Militia." O'Reilly was later appointed governor of colonial Louisiana in 1769, where he became known as "Bloody O'Reilly."

Another Irishman, Colonel Thomas O'Daly, joined Field Marshal Alejandro O'Reilly to work on the further revamping of San Felipe del Morro and was named chief engineer of modernizing the defenses of San Juan, which included the fortress of San Cristóbal. Later, O'Daly was granted land in the vicinity of Guaynabo, and he developed it into a thriving sugar hacienda.

O'Daly and fellow Irishman Miguel Kirwan became business partners in the "Hacienda San Patricio", which they named after the chief patron saint of Ireland, Saint Patrick. The plantation no longer exists. The land on which it was located is now a suburb called San Patricio, with a shopping mall, San Patricio Plaza.

O'Daly, following the example of other Irishmen in Puerto Rico, married a local woman of social standing, María Gertrudis de la Puente, herself of Spanish background; they had three children: Isabel, Manuel, and Demetrio. Easily, he joined a thriving Irish immigrant community on the island that would come to be associated with the growth of commercial agriculture.

Upon his untimely death in 1781, his brother Jaime took over the property and helped raise Thomas's children. Jaime O'Daly was named director of the Real Fábrica de Tabaco (Royal Tobacco Factory) in Puerto Rico by the Spanish Crown in 1787.

Jaime O'Daly became a successful sugar and tobacco planter. His nephews, Julio and Arturo O'Neill, moved to Puerto Rico in 1783 with their slaves and plantation equipment, and they were later followed by Thomas Armstrong, another Irishman and planter, in 1791.

O'Daly's connections with the non-Hispanic Caribbean and European nations helped him economically, but it hindered his nomination to a post on the prestigious San Juan City Council. O'Daly remained in Puerto Rico, where he died of natural causes in 1806 and was buried in the San Juan Cathedral.

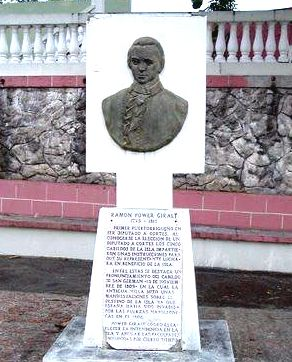
Plaque honoring Ramon Power y Giralt in San German, Puerto Rico

Joaquín Power y Morgan, of Spanish, Irish and French ancestry, came to Puerto Rico in connection with the Compañía de Asiento de Negros (Black Agreement Company), which regulated the slave trade on the island. He married María Josefa Giralt, of Catalan and Irish descent, and they settled in San Juan. In 1775, they had a son, whom they named Ramón. Their son would go on to an illustrious career in the service of both Spain and Puerto Rico.

Ramón Power y Giralt distinguished himself as a captain in the Spanish Navy when he defended the Spanish colony of Santo Domingo against an invasion from French forces by enforcing a blockade from 1808 to 1809.

Power y Giralt, who, according to Puerto Rican historian Lidio Cruz Monclova, was the first native-born Puerto Rican to refer to himself as a Puerto Rican, was named Puerto Rico's representative to the Spanish Cortes in 1808 and later became vice president of this legislative assembly. He served in the Cortes until his death in 1813.

As a young man, Demetrio O'Daly, Thomas O'Daly's son, went to Spain, where he received his military training. O'Daly participated in the 1809 Peninsular War and was promoted to the rank of brigadier general during Spain's war for independence. Defender of the Spanish Constitution of 1812, O'Daly was considered a rebel and thus was exiled from Spain by King Fernando VII in 1814.

In 1820, O'Daly participated in the successful revolt against the Spanish monarchy which resulted in his promotion to Field Marshal. He was then appointed the Representative of Puerto Rico before the Spanish Cortes. One of his accomplishments as representative was the enactment of a law which separated the civil authority from the military authority in the island.

In 1823, O'Daly was exiled by the restored Spanish Crown, only to return to Puerto Rico in 1834. He then returned to Spain in 1836, where he died the following year.

Miguel Conway, Patricio Fitzpatrick, Felipe Doran, Jaime Kiernan, and Antonio Skerret were other Irishmen involved in commercial farming around northern Puerto Rico. They expanded their agricultural endeavors with the help of additional Irish immigrants to the island that they had brought over to work on their farms and plantations.

Their properties covered areas from Toa Baja in the northeast to Luquillo in the east. At one point, Kiernan managed to acquire 400 acres (1.6 km^{2}) of land in Hato Rey, increasing his total landholdings to 800 acres (3.2 km^{2}).

== Irish influence in Puerto Rico's sugar and tobacco industry ==
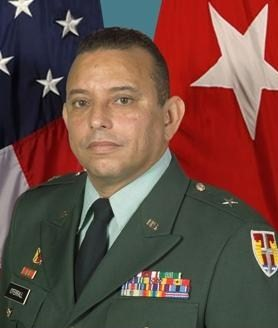
Brigadier General Rafael O'Ferrall is the Commanding General of the Joint Force Headquarters at San Juan, Puerto Rico.

Undoubtedly, Irish immigrants played an instrumental role in the development and further expansion of Puerto Rico's economy and trade with Europe and other European colonies on the North and South American continents.

One of the most important industries of the island was the sugar industry. In addition to Thomas O'Daly, whose plantation was a huge financial success, other Irishmen became successful businessmen in the industry, among them Miguel Conway, who owned a plantation in Hatillo, and Juan Nagle, whose plantation was located in Río Piedras.

Not surprisingly, Puerto Ricans of Irish descent also had a hand in the development of the island's tobacco industry. Miguel Conroy is credited with being the founder of the tobacco trade in Puerto Rico and another Irish family, the Quinlans, established two very profitable tobacco plantations, one in Toa Baja and the other in Loíza.

== Brief expulsion of the Irish from Puerto Rico ==
On February 17, 1797, the governor of Puerto Rico, Brigadier-general Ramón de Castro, received the news that Britain had captured the Spanish colony of Trinidad. Believing that Puerto Rico would be the next British target, he decided to put the local militia on alert and to prepare the island's forts against any military action. Following the failed British invasion of Puerto Rico in 1797, de Castro became suspicious of all white Anglophones in Puerto Rico. He ordered several groups of residents in the colony, including those of British and Irish descent, to be placed under surveillance. Many were given eight days to leave the island and those who did not leave were imprisoned.

The people in Puerto Rico, among them Treasury official Felipe Antonio Mejía, were so outraged by de Castro's actions that they sent special envoys to Spain on behalf of the Irish immigrant and merchant community on the island. They made their views known to the Spanish Crown to whom they condemned the governor's measures as legally unjustified and economically counter-productive, promoting their strongly held conviction to the Crown that the Irish immigrants had already proven their allegiance to the Spanish colonial government and were invaluable economic and trade partners that expanded Puerto Rico's trade horizons with Spain and the Western Hemisphere colonies. Eventually, the temporarily banned Irish and their families returned to the island, including the O'Dalys, Dorans, Kiernans, Quinlans, O'Ferran, Butler, Killeleigh and Skerrets, among many others. In 1823, Robert and Josiah Archibald, Irish brothers, imported and introduced to Puerto Rico the island's first steam-operated mill which they successfully used in their already profitable Ponce sugar plantation. By so doing, they further highlighted the economic importance of the Irish immigrant community in Puerto Rico.

== 19th century ==
=== Royal Decree of Graces of 1815 ===
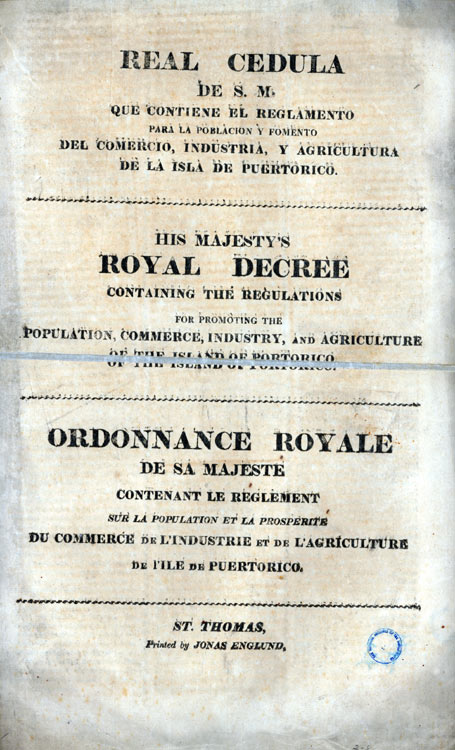
Royal Decree of Graces, 1815

By 1825, the Spanish Empire had lost all of its colonial territories in the Americas with the exception of Puerto Rico and Cuba.

These two possessions, nevertheless, had been demanding more autonomy since the formation of pro-independence movements in 1808. Realizing that it was in danger of losing its two remaining Caribbean colonies, the Spanish Crown revived the Royal Decree of Graces of 1815.

In this second incarnation, the original decree was printed this time in three languages, Spanish, English and French, with the absolutely fervent intention of immediately attracting Europeans of non-Spanish origin. The hope was that the independence movements would lose their popularity and strength with the arrival of new settlers. Furthermore, free land was offered to those who wanted to immigrate to the two islands on the condition that they swear loyalty to the Spanish Crown and allegiance to the Roman Catholic Church.

Among the hundreds of Irish immigrant families who received free land was that of Angus McBean. The McBeans became involved in the cultivation of sugarcane and established a huge plantation in Bayamón. In 1821, the slaves owned by McBean were involved in a failed slave revolt planned and organized by Marcos Xiorro, a bozal slave.

During this time, the O'Neill family arrived in Puerto Rico from Spain and other locations in the Caribbean, among them the islands of Tortola and St. Croix. They joined the already thriving Irish immigrant community.

Many Puerto Ricans with the O'Neill surname can trace their ancestry to Colonel Arturo O'Neill O'Keffe. O'Neill O'Keffe was the son of Tulio O'Neill O'Kelly and Catherine O'Keffe y Whalen. On August 8, 1828, O'Neill O'Keffe, a Knight of the Royal Order of King Carlos the 3rd of Spain and 2nd Marqués del Norte, served as a lieutenant colonel in the Spanish garrison of the City of Bayamón. He was married to Joanna Chabert Heyliger.

The offspring of Arturo and Joanna O'Neill were Tulio Luis, Arturo, Micaela Ulpiana and Gonzalo, all of whom had the surnames of O'Neill (their Irish father) y Chabert (their French mother). All, with the exception of Tulio Luis, were born in Puerto Rico where they married and raised their families.

=== Great Famine ===
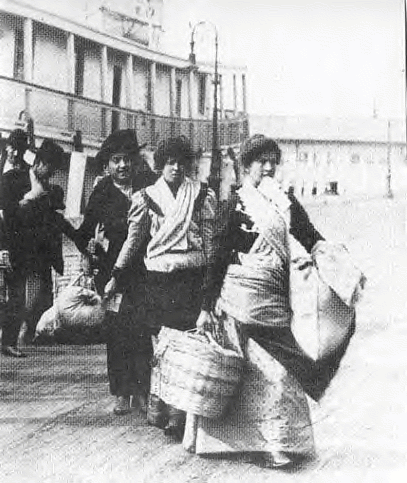
Early Irish settlers, such as the ones pictured, immigrated to the Americas, including Puerto Rico.

Because of the many economic and political changes occurring in Europe during the latter part of the 18th century and the beginning of the 19th century, hundreds of agricultural farm workers and their families abandoned their work in the countryside. With the advent of the Second Industrial Revolution they moved to the larger cities in search of better paying jobs.

Those who stayed behind and tended to their farmlands suffered the consequences of the widespread crop failures brought about as a result of long periods of drought and diseases such as the cholera epidemic and the potato fungus which caused the Great Irish Famine of 1840. Mass starvation was widespread in Europe. Specifically, in Ireland, the Great Famine killed over one million people and created nearly two million refugees. These refugees went to Great Britain, the United States, Australia, Canada, New Zealand, and, of course, the Caribbean. One of the islands that many Irish families emigrated in large numbers to throughout this period continued to be Irish-friendly Puerto Rico. Moreover, being a Spanish colony, the island had a primarily Roman Catholic population which appealed to the Irish immigrants, as opposed to the Protestant majorities of most of the colonies of the British Empire and the United States at the time that were openly hostile to Irish immigration.

== 20th century ==
After Puerto Rico was ceded by Spain to the United States at the end of the Spanish–American War in 1898, many Irish-American soldiers who were assigned to the military bases in the island chose to stay upon meeting other Irish-descended individuals in Puerto Rico. Unlike their counterparts who settled in the United States in close knit communities, the Irish immigrants on the island quickly became part of the community in Puerto Rico and adopted the language and customs of the island, thereby completely integrating themselves into the society of their new homeland. From the first wave of Irish immigration in the 16th century this had been the case. Irish immigrants to the island intermarried with Puerto Ricans.

The Irish influence in Puerto Rican politics is also notable. After Pedro Albizu Campos was honorably discharged from the United States Army, he attended Harvard University in Boston, Massachusetts. While in Boston he established clubs and centers where young Irish people congregated and discussed the independence of their homeland. Albizu Campos was invited by Éamon de Valera to assist as a consultant in the drafting of the Irish Free State constitution. After Albizu returned to Puerto Rico, he joined the Puerto Rican Nationalist Party and soon after became the party's president. Pedro Albizu Campos adopted the Irish republican movement as the model for the Nationalist Party to follow.

== Irish influence in Puerto Rican political and popular culture ==
Besides having distinguished careers in agriculture and the military, Puerto Ricans of Irish descent have made many other contributions to the Puerto Rican way of life. Their contributions can be found in, but are not limited to, the fields of education, commerce, politics, science and entertainment.

Among the members of the O'Neill family, whose contributions to Puerto Rican culture are evident today, are Héctor O'Neill, Mayor of Guaynabo and Ana María O'Neill, an educator, author, and advocate of women's rights.

Puerto Rican beauty queens of Irish descent who represented their country in the Miss Universe beauty pageant are the following: Ada Perkins, Miss Puerto Rico (1978), Deborah Carthy Deu, Miss Universe 1985 and Laurie Tamara Simpson, Miss Puerto Rico (1987).

The Irish element of Puerto Rico is very much in evidence. Their contributions to the archipelago's agricultural industry and in the fields of politics and education are highly notable. In the city of Bayamón, there is an urbanization called Irlanda Heights (Ireland Heights). For the last several years, the town of Luquillo has hosted a day-long Saint Patrick's Day festival which includes a Desfile de San Patricio (St. Patrick's Parade) honoring Ireland's chief patron saint. There are various Irish pubs around the island which also celebrate the holiday and serve the typical green colored beer on the occasion. Among them are Shannon's Irish Pub in San Juan, and Logan's Irish Pub in Río Piedras.

== Common Irish surnames in Puerto Rico ==
Surnames of the first Irish families in Puerto Rico
Anderson, Armstrong, Balfour, Ballantine (Valentin), Branagh, Breslin, Butler, Carney, Cole, Coll, Coleman, Coney, Conroy, Conway, Cooper, Costello, Cotton, Davis, Darby, Donegal, Doran, Dunn, Dunaho, Duran, Ferran (O'Ferran), Finlay, Fitzgerald, Fitzpatrick, Gilbert, Hayes, Henna, Kelly, Kearney, Kennedy, Kiernan, Kilkenny, Killeleigh, Kinsella/Quinsella, Kirwan, Logan, Martin, Mayo, McComber, McConnie, McClintock, McCormick, McDougall, McKinney, Monaghan, Monroe, Morgan, Munro, Murphy (Morfi), Murray, Nagle, Nolan, O'Daly, O'Ferral (O'Farrell), O'Ferran (Ferran), O'Fray, Oliver, O'Hara, O'Mara, O'Neill, O'Reilly, Perkins, Power/Powers, Quinlan, Richardson, Roberts, Scanlon, Shanahan, Simmons, Simpson, Skerret, Sullivan (Sólivan/Soliván), Todd, Walker, Williams and Wilson...among others.

== See also ==
- Cultural diversity in Puerto Rico
- Irish diaspora
- List of Puerto Ricans
- O'Neill dynasty
- Irish Americans
