= María de Mater O'Neill =

Puerto Rican artist, designer and educator

- Born: 1960 (age 65–66); San Juan, Puerto Rico
- Education: Cooper Union School of Art and Science; Northumbria University
- Alma mater: Northumbria University
- Known for: Painting, design, lithography, education
- Style: Contemporary art, printmaking, design
- Movement: Latin American art, Caribbean art
- Awards: XIII Bienal de San Juan Prize (2001); III Bienal Internacional de Cuenca First Prize (1991); Federal Design Achievement Awards (1995); BID Prize, II Iberoamerican Design Biennal (2010)
- Website: rubberbandpr.com

María de Mater O'Neill (born 1960, in San Juan, Puerto Rico) is a Puerto Rican artist, designer and educator.

== Education ==
María de Mater O'Neill (Mari Mater O'Neill) was born in San Juan, Puerto Rico in 1960. She received her B.F.A. from Cooper Union School of Art and Science, New York, United States in 1984 and a Professional Doctorate in Design Practice from the School of Design of Northumbria University in 2014. This was the first professional doctorate in Design given in Europe.

== Career ==
=== Painting ===
She obtained the Second Honorable Mention for the paintings «Balcón» and «Patio» in the 34ème International of the Peinture, celebrated in the Chateau-Musee of the Cagnes-sur-Mer, Côte d'Azur, France (2002). In addition she has been awarded for the lithography «Clasifícame ésta», Prize, XIII Bienal de San Juan del Grabado Latinoamericano y del Caribe (2001) of the Instituto de Cultura Puertorriqueña; the Association of Artists UNESCO (1999); and First Prize, III Bienal Internacional de Cuenca, Ecuador (1991), for the painting «Donde moran los terribles».

She has participated in numerous exhibitions among them: ¡Impresionante!: Innovative Prints by Contemporary Puerto Rican Artists , curators Harper Montgomery and Deborah Cullen, International Print Center, NYC, New York, 2004; Only Skin Deep, curator Coco Fusco, Online Exhibition, International Center of Photography, NYC, New York, 2003–04; De Lo Que Soy/Of What I Am (an exhibition of self-portraits by women from Latin America and the Caribbean, February 7 through May 12, 2003), Lehman College Art Gallery, NYC; Interrogating Diversity, Betty Rymer Gallery, School of the Institute of Art of Chicago, Chicago (2002); Flight of the Falcon, Girifalco Fortress, Cortona, Italy (2001); El arte en Puerto Rico a través del tiempo, Museo de Arte de Puerto Rico (2001); Latin Caribbean, Cuba, Dominican Republic and Puerto Rico, MOOLA, Los Angeles, CA (2000); The Richness of Diversity Contemporary Puerto Rican and Mexican Artists, Susquehanna Art Museum, Harrisburg, Pennsylvania (1997); Caribbean Visions: Contemporary Painting and Sculpture, traveling exhibition, Center for Fine Arts, Miami (1995 a 1996); Latin American Women Artists 1915-1995, Milwaukee Art Museum, traveling exhibition, Phoenix Art Museum, The Denver Art Museum, The National Museum of Women in the Arts (1995–96); and, Otro País; escalas africanas, organized by the editor Simmon Njami of the Parisian magazine Revue Noire, traveling exhibition, Centro Atlántico de Arte Moderno, Mallorca, Spain (1994).

Her painting “Paisaje en Fuego Núm.2” became the United States and international promotional image of exhibition Latin American Women Artists 1915-1995. The exhibition was curated by Geraldine Biller, Milwaukee Art Museum. It was an itinerant exhibition: Phoenix Art Museum, Arizona, The Denver Art Museum, Colorado, The National Museum of Women in the Arts, California and others venues (1995–96).

At the beginning of 1999, she was invited by the Center of Innovative Printmaking and Papermaking, Rutgers University, New Jersey to give lectures and to create the lithography «Clasifícame ésta» as a resident artist. With this work she becomes part of the delegation from Puerto Rico sent to the exhibition Argentina Contemporary Lithography, 1999: 4th Edition in Buenos Aires, Argentina.

In 2000 her work was discussed in the book: "Images of Ambiente: Homotextuality and Latin American Art 1810-today" by Rudi C. Bleys (Continuum Press, London) and a profile was written by Luisita Lopez Torregrosa in the New York Times, Arts and Leisure section ("Puerto Rican Art Moves Outward, and More Inward", March 11, 2001).

In 2007, a major retrospective exhibition María de Mater O’Neill: Artista Interrumpida, curated by Dr. Elaine King, opened at the Museo de Arte de Puerto Rico Artista interrumpida: selección de obras de María de Mater O’Neill. Del Post al Después (1986–2006).

In 2007, O'Neill began "Painting for a Specific Floor", a collaborative project with architect Andres Mignucci. O'Neill was invited as artist-in-residence at Casa Poli in Concepción, Chile. They premiered the piece in November 2008 and they also produced a book with the same name.

=== Design ===
In 2008 O'Neill co-founded Rubberband, LLP, a transformative design studio where professionals of diverse backgrounds are invited to collaborate, where works as Creative Director and Head Researcher of the first user-centered design firm in Puerto Rico.

Previously, as an independent contractor, she was responsible for launching the following websites: Banco Popular (1996); Ad Agency Lopito, Ileana & Howie (1997); non-profit Fundación Puertorriqueña de las Humanidades (1998); and Instituto de Cultura Puertorriqueña (1999). She created 1995 the cultural e-zine El cuarto del Quenepón the first cultural e-zine in the Latino community. El cuarto del Quenepón was one of the first ten Spanish e-zines on the Internet and in the first 100 in the world. The project lasted 10 years and involved a voluntary, collaborative and interdisciplinary collective effort that was a precedent of blog publishing. It was included in the exhibition Trienal Poligráfica de San Juan, América Latina y el Caribe, Instituto de Cultura Puertorriqueña, San Juan (2004).

She has won the following design awards: Federal Design Achievement Awards, Round Four of the Presidential Design, Washington D.C. (1995) and BID Prize, II Iberoamerican Design Biennal, Madrid, Spain (2010).

=== Education ===
O’Neill co-created and developed the Department of Image and Design for the Escuela de Artes Plásticas de Puerto Rico (1995). She later conceptualized and helped develop the Centro de Diseño, a university design business for the Escuela de Artes Plásticas de Puerto Rico (2005). The objectives were to give professional experience to students, as well as career advancements to faculty and strengthen the economic structure of the art school, which helped the School acquired a National Association of Schools of Art and Design accreditation.

== Collections ==
- Chase Manhattan Bank, Soho, New York
- Compañía de Turismo de Puerto Rico, San Juan
- Cooperativa de Seguros Múltiples, Puerto Rico
- Doral Bank, Puerto Nuevo, Puerto Rico
- Instituto de Cultura Puertorriqueña, Col. Bienal de San Juan
- International Museum of Women, San Francisco
- Lehigh University Art Galleries, Bethlehem, PA
- Museo de Historia, Antropología y Arte de la Universidad de Puerto Rico
- Museo de Arte de Ponce, Puerto Rico
- Museo de Arte de Puerto Rico, San Juan, Puerto Rico
- Museo de Arte Contemporáneo de Puerto Rico
- Museo de Arte Contemporáneo de Panamá, Panamá
- Museo de Arte Moderno, Cuenca, Ecuador
- Museum of Fine Arts, Springfield, Massachusetts
- Museo del Barrio, New York
- National Design Museum, New York
- The Cooper Union School of Art, New York
- RG Bank, Hato Rey, Puerto Rico

== See also ==
- List of Puerto Ricans
- Irish immigration to Puerto Rico
