= Michele LaFountain =

Puerto Rican journalist (born 1969)

Michele LaFountain (born 1969) is the first Puerto Rican to become anchor of ESPN's Spanish version of SportsCenter.

== Early years ==
Michele was born and raised in San Juan, Puerto Rico. She earned a Bachelor's degree in English and American Literature at Harvard University. She also received a Master's degree in Mass Communications from Boston University.

== Career at ESPN ==
In 1997, Michele began her sports broadcasting career as a co-anchor for ESPN's SportsCenter International. In 2000, Michele joined WNJU, the Telemundo station in New York City, and served as anchor for the nightly newscast "Noticiero 47" (News Center 47) and also as the host of "Deportes 47" (Sports 47), a weekly sports show. Michele was also the New York correspondent for "Titulares Telemundo," a national sports show. She received three Emmy Award nominations for her work at Telemundo.

Michele returned to ESPN in 2003, when she was named anchor together with Heriberto Murrieta, Fernando Palomo and Jorge Eduardo Sanchez to launch the Spanish version of ESPN SportsCenter on ESPN Deportes. She also hosted an interview program created by ESPN called "Primera Plana" (Headliners), featuring exclusive chats with sports stars of the moment.

In 2008, LaFountain became a regular anchor on ESPNews.

== See also ==
- List of Puerto Ricans
- French immigration to Puerto Rico
