= Demetrio O'Daly =

Puerto Rican Field Marshal in the Spanish Army

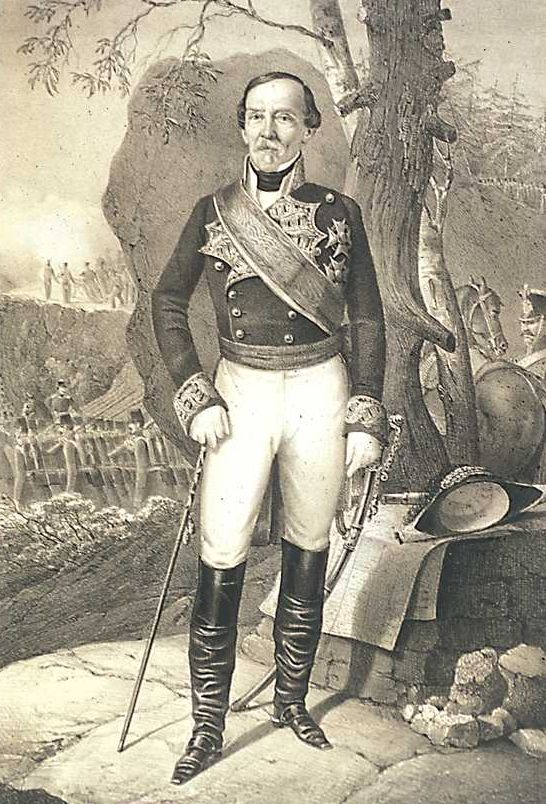
- O'Daly was the first Puerto Rican to reach the rank of Field Marshal in the Spanish Army.
- Born: January 26, 1780; San Juan, Puerto Rico
- Died: 1837 (aged 56–57); Madrid, Spain
- Military career
- Allegiance: Spanish Army
- Rank: Field Marshal
- Commands: Military Governor of Cartagena, Spain
- Conflicts: Peninsular War
- Awards: Cruz Laureada de San Fernando

Field Marshal Demetrio O'Daly (January 26, 1780 – 1837) was the first Puerto Rican to attain the rank of Field Marshal in the Spanish Army. He was awarded the Cruz Cruz Laureada de San Fernando (Laureate Cross of Saint Fernando), the highest military decoration bestowed by the Spanish government. O'Daly also served as a delegate representing Puerto Rico in the Spanish Courts. Notable among his contributions was the introduction of a bill to the Spanish legislature that established free commercial trade and public education in Puerto Rico.

== Early years ==
O'Daly (birth name: Demetrio O'Daly Fernández de la Puente) was born in San Juan, Puerto Rico. He lived there with his parents, Tomás O'Daly and Maria de la Puente y Franco, and his older brother and sister. His father, Tomás, was a colonel in the Spanish Army Corps of Engineers. He was sent to Puerto Rico to revamp the El Morro fort, which was then known as the Castle of Saint Philip. Tomás was also appointed chief engineer to modernize the defenses of San Juan, including the Castle of San Cristóbal.

His father went on to become a successful businessman, playing a key role in the growth of commercial agriculture. After his father's death in 1781, O’Daly's uncle Jaime took control of the family property and took responsibility for raising the three O'Daly children. O'Daly received his early education at private schools, and as he grew older, he was sent to Spain, where he received training at a military education institute.

== Military career ==
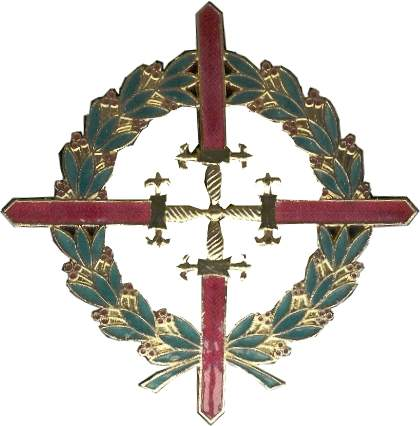
Cruz Laureada de San Fernando

O'Daly participated in various military engagements. He was a Sergeant Major in the army when he participated in the 1809 Peninsular War, also known as the Spanish War of Independence, after the Napoleonic Invasion of 1808 and the kidnapping of both king Charles IV and Prince Ferdinand, later king Ferdinand VII. Both were taken to Fontainebleau in France, while Napoleon usurped the Spanish Crown naming his brother Joseph as king of the Spains of Europe and the Indies; before Spanish-American Independence, Spain was a single 'federal' country divided into several kingdoms in Europe, Asia, Africa and the Americas. The Spanish Armed Forces of Europe were divided between the collaborationists with Napoleon (afrancesados) and the Patriots against the Napoleonic Occupation/Usurpation. Thousands of European (peninsular) and overseas (criollos/creole) Spaniards participated in the War. While the war was taking place, the "Diputación Permanente del Reino” a sort of Council of the Regency, during the imprisonment of the king, convoked the Spanish Parliament, which convened in Cádiz. This called for members of Parliament from all the kingdoms and captainships.

Demetrio O'Daly was elected as senior MP for his native Captainship General of Puerto Rico. During the conflict he was promoted to the rank of Brigadier General. As most people wished at the time, when king Ferdinand returned from exile and kidnap, he repealed the Constitution of 1812, which as the rest of European monarchs, he felt was a Napoleonic maneuver to weaken countries. But O'Daly was a defender of the Spanish Constitution of 1812, was considered a rebel and exiled from Spain by King Fernando VII in 1814. In 1820 O'Daly, a liberal constitutionalist, together with fellow rebel Col. Rafael Riego organized and led the Revolt of the Colonels. It was a most inopportune revolt, when there was a fleet and army of 50,000 embarking for Venezuela against the British-financed and armed Bolivarian rebels. O'Daly and Riego stopped the army from sailing and went to Madrid. It was not a revolt against the king, but a revolt to force him reinstate the constitution. This was called the Trienio Liberal/Liberal Three years (1820–23). While the 1820 revolt was successful in having the king reinstate the Constitution, it failed miserably to supply the Royalists in South America who were running out of resources against Britain, Simon Bolivar and Jose de San Martin. During this process he was promoted to Field Marshal and awarded the Cruz Laureada de San Fernando (Laureate Cross of Saint Ferdinand), the highest military decoration awarded by the Spanish government.

== Spanish Courts ==
On August 21, 1820, he was again elected as a Parliamentarian to the Parliament Spanish Cortes representing his native province of Puerto Rico. In parliament he was named Vice-Speaker of Parliament. Because at the time, Puerto Rico was a Mexican governorship, within the kingdom of New Spain, O'Daly introduced a bill to Parliament which established free trade between the island and the rest of the Spains in Europe and the Indies and one reorganizing public education in Puerto Rico, reforming the 1745 Act.

He was also responsible for the Act of Parliament which created the position of Military and Civil Governor in all Spanish provinces worldwide. At the time, provincial governors took care of both the civil and military governments simultaneously. But with the new Constitutional System in place this new Act of Parliament introduced by O'Daly, separated the civil and military jurisdictions and created the positions of a separate civil and military governors for Spanish Provinces, which, of course included his native island. To this day, both the civil and military provincial governors are appointed positions, not elective. the Spanish federal system has other regional elective posts.

In 1823, when the Trienio Liberal ended, O'Daly was exiled by the king and went to live in London. He later went to the Danish island of Saint Thomas with the intention of returning to Puerto Rico. However, and due to his participation and error in the 1820 Revolt of the Colonels which meant the loss of the South American kingdoms, on May 15, 1824, Lieutenant General Miguel Luciano de La Torre y Pando, the governor of Puerto Rico issued an order for his arrest in the event that O'Daly returned to the island.

== Later years ==
After King Ferdinand died in 1833, O'Daly was allowed to return to Puerto Rico in 1834. In 1836, he went back to European Spain and was named Military Governor of Cartagena, in the southeastern region of Murcia. A very important post, with great naval responsibilities. He died in Madrid, the capital of Spain, in 1837. After the 1898 Spanish–American War, and US takeover of the Spanish overseas Province of Puerto Rico, Martin Brumbaugh was sent as 'Education Delegate'. He redacted, censored and doctored the 400 years of Puerto Rican history. As he did with other Puerto Rican statesmen, artists, military, clergy, etc., of international renown in their day in the Spanish Kingdoms (1500-1898),

O'Daly, while one of the most important Spanish political and military figures of the early 19th century Napoleonic-Constitutional Crisis, is a forgotten and forsaken character in his native island. He is neither remembered, not taught in schools. The most that San Juan, his hometown, has done to honor his memory is the naming a third level street in a lower-middle class income part of town of, the "Calle Demetrio O'Daly".

== See also ==
- List of Puerto Ricans
- List of Puerto Rican military personnel
- Irish immigration to Puerto Rico
- Alejandro O'Reilly
