= Ana María O'Neill =

Puerto Rican activist and writer (1894–1981)

- The first female professor in the field of Commerce in the University of Puerto Rico
- Born: March 7, 1894; Aguadilla, Puerto Rico
- Died: May 24, 1981 (aged 87); San Juan, Puerto Rico
- Occupations: Educator, author and advocate of women's rights

Notes
- O'Neill was the founder of the "Cooperative Institute" of the University of Puerto Rico

Ana María O'Neill (March 7, 1894 – May 24, 1981) was an educator, author and advocate of women's rights.

== Early years ==
O'Neill was born in the town of Aguadilla, Puerto Rico, where she received her primary and secondary education. She enrolled and graduated from the Normal School of the University of Puerto Rico, where she earned her teacher's certificate in 1915. She taught in Puerto Rico until she decided to go to New York City to continue her education; there she attended Columbia University, and in 1927 earned a master's degree in education.

== Educator and activist ==
O'Neill returned to Puerto Rico, and in 1929 became the first female professor in the field of Commerce at the University of Puerto Rico, a discipline which she taught until 1951. As a women's rights activist, she urged women to participate in every aspect of civic life and to defend their right to vote.

O'Neill enrolled in the Rochdale Institute of the National School of Cooperativism, earning a diploma as a Cooperative leader. She fought for the Cooperative movement in Puerto Rico and was instrumental in the passing of the legislation entitled "The General Law of Cooperative Societies", in 1946. O'Neill was also the founder of the "Cooperative Institute" of the University of Puerto Rico.

== Author ==
In 1948, she authored the book Ética Para la Era Atómica (English title: Ethics for the Atomic Age) which was acclaimed and recognized with a literary award from North Western University. In 1966, O'Neill was honored by the Union of American Women who named her the 1966 "Woman of Puerto Rico". That same year she was recognized by the cooperative establishment of the island and was named "Woman of the Americas". O'Neill was also the author of Psicología de la Comunicación (The Psychology of Communication) which was published in 1986, five years after her death.

== Later years ==
Ana María O'Neill died in the city of San Juan, Puerto Rico, on May 24, 1981.

== Written works ==
- "Ethics for the Atomic Age" By Ana Maria O'Neill, Publisher; Boston: Meador Publishing Company, 1948.
- "Psicología de la Comunicación", O'Neill, Ana Maria, ISBN 0-8477-2907-9, ISBN 978-0-8477-2907-4, Publisher: Universidad de Puerto Rico Printing, Publication Date: 1986
- "Exposición de la taquigrafía Gregg", 1932
- "Exposición revisada de la taquigrafía Gregg", O'Neill, Ana María, et al., 1974
- "Nueva exposición revisada de la taquigrafía Gregg, Edición Oro", 1984, O'Neill, Ana María; O'Neill de Pumarada, Celeste; Muñíz De Vela, Olga; Vales de Portela, Carmen Pilar; Castillo, Gladys T

== See also ==
- List of Puerto Ricans
- Irish immigration to Puerto Rico
- History of women in Puerto Rico
