= Ada Perkins =

Puerto Rican pageant titleholder

- Born: Ada Cecille Perkins Flores; 7 September 1959; Ponce, Puerto Rico
- Died: 24 May 1980 (aged 20); San Juan, Puerto Rico
- Height: 5 ft 7 in (1.70 m)
- Beauty pageant titleholder
- Title: Miss San Juan 1978; Miss Puerto Rico 1978
- Hair color: Blonde
- Eye color: Hazel
- Major competitions: Miss Teen International 1978 (3rd place); Miss Puerto Rico 1978 (Winner); Miss Universe 1978 (Unplaced)

Ada Cecille Perkins Flores (7 September 1959 – 24 May 1980) was a Puerto Rican model and beauty pageant titleholder who represented Puerto Rico at the Miss Universe 1978 pageant.

In 1980, Puerto Rico was moved by the media news coverage of her death, which resulted from the injuries sustained in an automobile accident in San Juan.

== Early years ==
Perkins, the oldest of three siblings, was born in Ponce, Puerto Rico to Oswald Evan Perkins from San Juan and Ada Flores Sanchez. She received her primary and secondary education at St. John's School in the Condado area and later at the Academia del Perpetuo Socorro in Miramar. She graduated from high school in 1977 and enrolled at the Universidad del Sagrado Corazon where she was studying journalism.

== Model and beauty contestant ==
Perkins was a model who participated in television commercials for various companies, among them: "Chicklets Adams", "Texaco", "Salem cigarette" and for "INDULAC" (Dairy Producers Industry of Puerto Rico). In 1978, she represented Puerto Rico in the Miss Teen Intercontinental beauty pageant held in Oranjestad, Aruba. Perkins came in 3rd place.

In May of that same year, Perkins represented the city of San Juan in the Miss Puerto Rico contest and won the title. Miss Puerto Rico is the official national preliminary to the Miss Universe international pageant. Each year the event is held to select the representative from the island to the contest. There is a picture of her pictured with the Miss Puerto Rico sash and crown, which she was entitled to wear during her reign.

She then traveled to Acapulco, Mexico, where she represented Puerto Rico in the first Miss Universe pageant hosted by that country.

In 1979, Perkins crowned her successor to the title, Audrey Teresa López (Miss Mayaguez), in an event that included the presence of actor Erik Estrada.

== Death ==
In 1980, she and her boyfriend, Luis A. Ballester were involved in an automobile accident which occurred while they were traveling to her home in Punta las Marias, San Juan. She died in San Juan, Puerto Rico, as a result of the injuries sustained in the accident. She was buried at the Puerto Rico Memorial Cemetery in Carolina, Puerto Rico.

== See also ==
- List of Puerto Ricans
- Irish immigration to Puerto Rico

== Notes ==
Awards and achievements
Preceded by María del Mar Rivera (Ponce)	Miss Puerto Rico; 1978	Succeeded by Teresa López (Mayagüez)
