= Antonio Mignucci =

Puerto Rican scientist

Antonio A. Mignucci-Giannoni
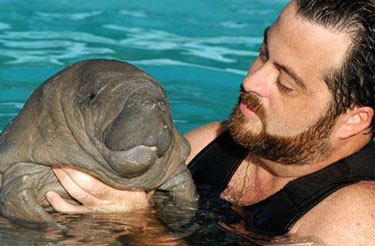
- Born: Antonio A. Mignucci-Giannoni; San Juan, Puerto Rico
- Education: Penn Foster College (AS); Colorado State University (BS); University of Rhode Island (MA); University of Puerto Rico at Mayagüez (PhD)
- Occupations: Scientist, Veterinary Technician
- Years active: 1985-present
- Known for: Marine species conservation and health

Antonio A. Mignucci (born 1964) is a biological oceanographer and veterinary technician specializing in the biology, management and conservation of marine mammals. He is the founder of the international non-profit conservation organization Red Caribeña de Varamientos (Caribbean Stranding Network) dedicated to the care, treatment, and rehabilitation of injured or stranded marine mammals, sea turtle and sea birds. As a scientist, Mignucci is an expert in endangered tropical marine mammals and a specialist in the West Indian manatee, and since 2009, the director of the Puerto Rico Manatee Conservation Center.

== Early life and education ==
Antonio Mignucci was born in San Juan, Puerto Rico in 1964. Mignucci graduated with a Bachelor of Science in Zoology from Colorado State University in 1986. Subsequently, he received a Master of Arts in Marine Affairs in 1989 from the University of Rhode Island. In 1996, Mignucci obtained a Doctor of Philosophy in Marine Sciences in Biological Oceanography from the University of Puerto Rico at Mayagüez. He is a Post-Doctoral Fellow from the Sirenia Project affiliated with the Florida Caribbean Science Center. His doctorate research centered in aquatic animal health, particularly strandings and necropsies of whales, dolphins, and manatees. During his doctoral studies, he founded the international non-profit conservation organization Red Caribeña de Varamientos (Caribbean Stranding Network). In 2018, Mignucci earned an Associate of Science in Veterinary Technology from Penn Foster College, and in 2023 became a Certified Aquatic Veterinary Technician (CertAqVNT) under the World Aquatic Veterinary Medical Association. Academic positions include Assistant Professor of Biology and Environmental Sciences at the University of Puerto Rico (1996–1998), Professor of Oceanography and Environmental Sciences at the Universidad Metropolitana (1998–2005), Research Professor at the Inter American University of Puerto Rico (2009 to 2013). He is currently a full professor of marine sciences at the Inter American University of Puerto Rico at Bayamón, and adjunct professor of Ross University School of Veterinary Medicine.

== Career ==
=== Research ===
As a scientist, Mignucci researches the biogeography, stranding and mortality of marine mammals, and studies their ecology through boat and aerial surveys, and the use of satellite transmitters. He also researches marine populations with the use of genetic tools. He is internationally recognized for his work on whales, dolphins, manatees and seals throughout the Caribbean. He has also lectured extensively in schools, universities and community-based non-profit organizations both in Puerto Rico and abroad. Mignucci serves as consultant to different public and private organizations on the development of holding facilities and on husbandry techniques for marine species, particularly manatees. He has also been scientific advisor to aquaria, non-profit conservation organizations, and research laboratories throughout the Caribbean, Central and South America, Europe, Africa, Taiwan, and United Arab Emirates, on medical treatment and husbandry techniques for captive manatees. In doing so, he has traveled extensively around the World. He actively serves as environmental consultant to government agencies, non-profit organizations, and private corporations throughout the world, on marine wildlife studies and recovery efforts of endangered species.

=== Publications ===
Mignucci has published extensively authoring with colleagues over 105 peer-reviewed publications in scientific journals He published his first book titled "El manatí de Puerto Rico," which details the natural history of Caribbean manatees in this tropical island. His second book was a children's book titled "Aunque viva en el agua," and his third book was an edited scientific compilation of conservation methods for manatees and dugongs around the world titled "Sirenian conservation: Issues and strategies in developing countries. In 2017 and 2018 he co-authored two books with Fundación Omacha, one titled "Guía para la atención de varamientos de mamíferos acuáticos en Colombia," and a second titled "Cetáceos, sirénios y tortugas Marinas: Guía de identificación en el Caribe y Pacífico colombiano." His sixth book was co-authored with his late mother, María C. Giannoni, in 2021 and titled "Mi enigmática sonrisa," and his last book was published in 2022, co-authored with the Puerto Rican poet Isabelita Freire de Matos, titled "Para un manatí: Moisés y las sirenas."

=== Community education and outreach ===
Through the Caribbean Stranding Network, Mignucci has applied his scientific and research experience on oceans and marine wildlife to outreach and community educational programs in Puerto Rico. He is the author of didactic materials, both in video, multimedia and printed formats, on information and conservation awareness about our seas and endangered marine wildlife. In 1994, he co-authored with the late singer Tony Croatto the song and video "Moisés llego del Mar" about manatees and their protection. The song became a symbol for wildlife conservation in Puerto Rico.

Since 1994, he is an Commission Member of the Sirenian Specialist Group of the IUCN-The World Conservation Union in Gland, Switzerland. His work was featured throughout the globe in the "Earthpulse II" television series of the National Geographic Channel, broadcast in 2002 and 2003, in ABC-TV's program "Ocean Mysteries with Jeff Corwin" in 2013, PBS and England's Channel 4 program "Born in the Wild" in 2014, PBS, BBC, and Animal Planet's "Nature: Viva Puerto Rico" ("Puerto Rico: Island of Enchantment") in 2017 and 2019, and MedienKontor's "Seekühe Erhaltung Center" in 2021.

=== Honors and awards ===
In 2004, he was awarded the "Citizen of the Year Award" by the Puerto Rico Environmental Quality Board, and the "Environmental Quality Award" by the United States Environmental Protection Agency in New York City. In 2022 and 2023, he earned the Global Humane's (American Humane) "Humane Hero Award," and was named "Ambassador" in the 2023 National Puerto Rican Day Parade in New York City. In 2024, the Scuba Diving Magazine, PADI, and Seiko Watch of America chose him as "Sea Hero" for his January 2024 issue of the magazine.

== See also ==
- List of Puerto Ricans
- Corsican immigration to Puerto Rico
- List of Puerto Rican scientists and inventors
- University of Puerto Rico at Mayaguez people
