= Rafael O'Ferrall =

United States general since 2008

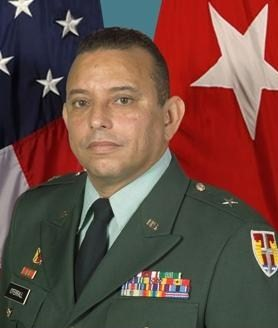
- Brigadier General Rafael O'Ferrall; Deputy Commanding General for the Joint Task Force-Guantanamo Bay, Cuba
- Born: June 29, 1954 (age 72); New York City, NY
- Military career
- Allegiance: United States of America
- Branch: Army National Guard
- Service years: 1978-2018
- Rank: Brigadier General
- Commands: Deputy Commanding General of the Joint Force Headquarters, of San Juan, Puerto Rico; Deputy Commanding General for the Joint Task Force at Guantanamo Bay, Cuba
- Awards: Defense Superior Service Medal; Meritorious Service Medal (with 1 Gold Star Navy)
- Other work: General Manager of Dade Paper Company's Puerto Rico and Caribbean Division

Brigadier General Rafael O'Ferrall (born June 29, 1954) is an Army National Guard officer who is the Deputy Commanding General for the Joint Task Force at Guantanamo Bay, Cuba and the Assistant Adjutant General (Army) and Deputy Commanding General of the Joint Force Headquarters at San Juan, Puerto Rico.

== Early years ==
O'Ferrall (birth name: Rafael O'Ferrall Córdova (Note: O'Ferrall's birth name follows Spanish naming customs: the first or paternal family name is "O'Ferrall" and the second or maternal family name is "Córdova".)) was born to Victor Manuel O'Ferrall Sr., from Santurce and Blanca Rose Córdova, a nurse from the town of Yabucoa. His parents moved to the United States from Puerto Rico in search for a better way of life and lived in New York City where O'Ferrall was born. When he was five years old, he was sent to live with his grandmother in Puerto Rico, where he received his primary and secondary education. In the 1960s O'Ferrall's mother returned to Puerto Rico upon the death of his grandmother. He was enrolled at Dr. Jose M. Lazaro High School in Carolina, Puerto Rico, where he excelled in sports. In 1972, he was asked by the Puerto Rico Olympic Committee to represent Puerto Rico in the Munich Olympics in track and field events, however he was later substituted by the more experienced Luis Alers. After he graduated from high school in 1973, he enrolled in the University of Puerto Rico and participated in various competitions as member of the track and field team of his alma mater. Later, he represented the island in the XII 1974 Central American and Caribbean Games which were celebrated in Santo Domingo, Dominican Republic. During his student years he became a member of the university's Reserve Officer Training Corps program, which is also known as ROTC. He earned his Bachelor of Science degree with a concentration on Natural Science on June 20, 1978, and was commissioned a second lieutenant in the Puerto Rico National Guard that same year. In 1986 he earned a Master of Business Administration and Management from the University of Turabo.

== Military career ==
O'Ferrall was assigned to Charlie Battery, 1st Battalion, 162nd Field Artillery at Hato Rey, Puerto Rico. From June 1978 to June 1984, he served in various administrative positions, among them: assistant executive officer, forward observer and fire direction officer. On June 19, 1984, O'Ferrall was promoted to first lieutenant and assigned to the 101st Troop Command in San Juan, Puerto Rico, where he served as communication electronic officer, until February 1985. On February he was assigned to Camp Santiago Joint Training Center in Salinas, Puerto Rico, as Communication Electronic Officer, during which he was promoted to the rank of captain (1985).

In 1986, O'Ferrall earned his master's degree in business administration and management from Turabo University in Gurabo, Puerto Rico, and served as range control officer at Camp Santiago until October 1988. That same year he served as trainer and facilitator at the Interamerican University of Puerto Rico's biotechnology workshop. From October 1988 to May 1992, he continued to serve at Camp Santiago, as detachment commander and as director of administration branch and was promoted to major.

In May 1992, O'Ferrall was named assistant G-4 of the State Area Command Headquarters at San Juan, Puerto Rico, and from March 1994 to April 1997, he served as operations officer S-3, Headquarters, Headquarters Battery, 1st Battalion, 162nd Field Artillery, Hato Rey, Puerto Rico. In 1996, he became a member of the board of directors of the Puerto Rico Manufacturers Association and served as such until 1999. In April 1997, O'Ferrall was named combat commander at Headquarters of the 201st Regimental School at Fort Allen in Juana Díaz, Puerto Rico. On August 28, he was promoted to lieutenant colonel and in March 1998, he was once more reassigned to the 162nd Field Artillery, this time as commander.

Outside of his military roles, he was a member of the Labor Department Employer Committee in Carolina, Puerto Rico (1998) and member of the course design committee at the University of Puerto Rico's Business Management School (1999).

In May 2000, he became Operations Officer S-3, of the 101st Troop Command and in June 2001, the Temporary Additional Duty at Headquarters, State Area Command. From July 2001 to July 2002, O'Ferrall continued his military academic education and became the first Puerto Rican to attend the United States Army War College/ Senior Service College at Harvard University; upon completion, he was reassigned to Headquarters, State Area Command as Logistics Staff Officer and in September 2002 as Director, Secretary General Staff.

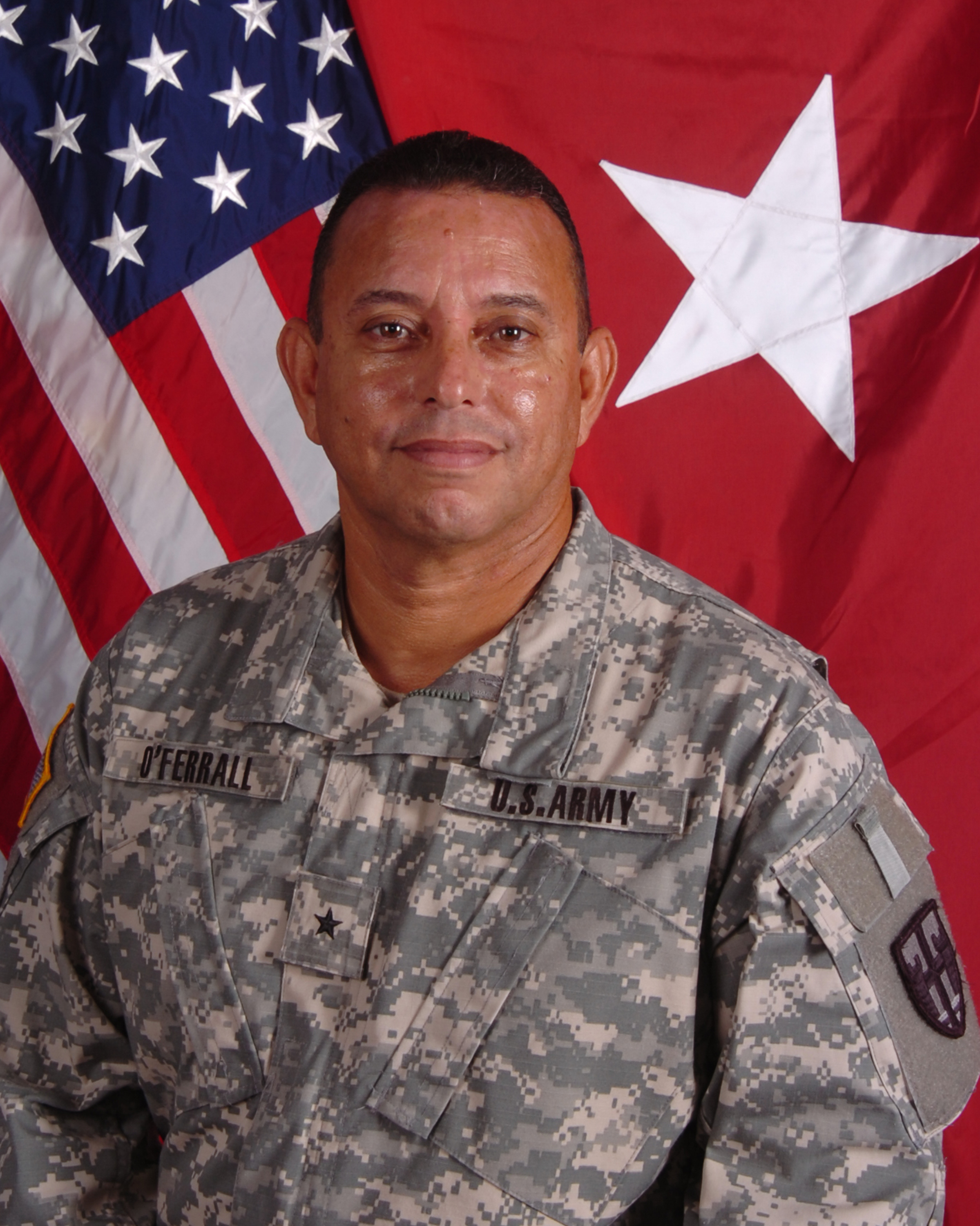
Deputy commanding general, Guantanamo Bay, Cuba

In October 2002, he was promoted to the rank of colonel and in February 2003, he was sent to Fort Bragg, North Carolina, where he first served as deputy brigade commander and later as brigade commander of Task Force Guardian Mariner, XVIII Airborne Corps, which conducted operations in support of Operation Iraqi Freedom / Operation Noble Eagle. O'Ferrall managed and directed mobile security teams to complete over 242 security missions aboard 173 Military Sealift Command ships, ensuring the safe and timely delivery of over 500,000,000 square feet (46,000,000 m^{2}) of war fighting equipment and supplies essentials to United States Central Command.

In 2004, O'Ferrall attended the Executive Seminar Anti-Terrorism/Force Protection, Level IV, at Washington, D.C., and the United States Navy, Commanding Officer Anti-Terrorist/Force Protection Course, Level III at Norfolk, Virginia. Upon the completion of the courses he was assigned to the 92nd Infantry Brigade Separate in Puerto Rico as Deputy Brigade Commander and in September 2004 as Director Military/Civilian at the Joint Force Headquarters. In 2005, O'Ferrall served in the Board of Directors of the Chamber of the Food Industries Marketing and Distribution Association in Puerto Rico. During his stint at the Joint Force Headquarters from April 2006 to December 2008, O'Ferrall served in various positions, among them as Director for Operations J-3, Director for Intelligence J-2 and Assistant Adjutant General-Army/Deputy Commanding General (Army). In this assignment he was responsible for the training, readiness, personnel, and other areas of the Puerto Rico Army National Guard. He also served in the Board of Directors of the Puerto Rico Economic Development Alliance (2007) and in the Board of Directors of the Puerto Rico Manufacturers Association from 2006 to the present. In 2008 attended the Joint Task Force Commander Training Course, United States Northern Command at Peterson Air Force Base in Colorado Springs, Colorado, he was promoted to the rank of brigadier general.

In 2018 Rafael O'Ferrall was inducted to the Puerto Rico Veterans Hall of Fame.

== Guantanamo Bay ==
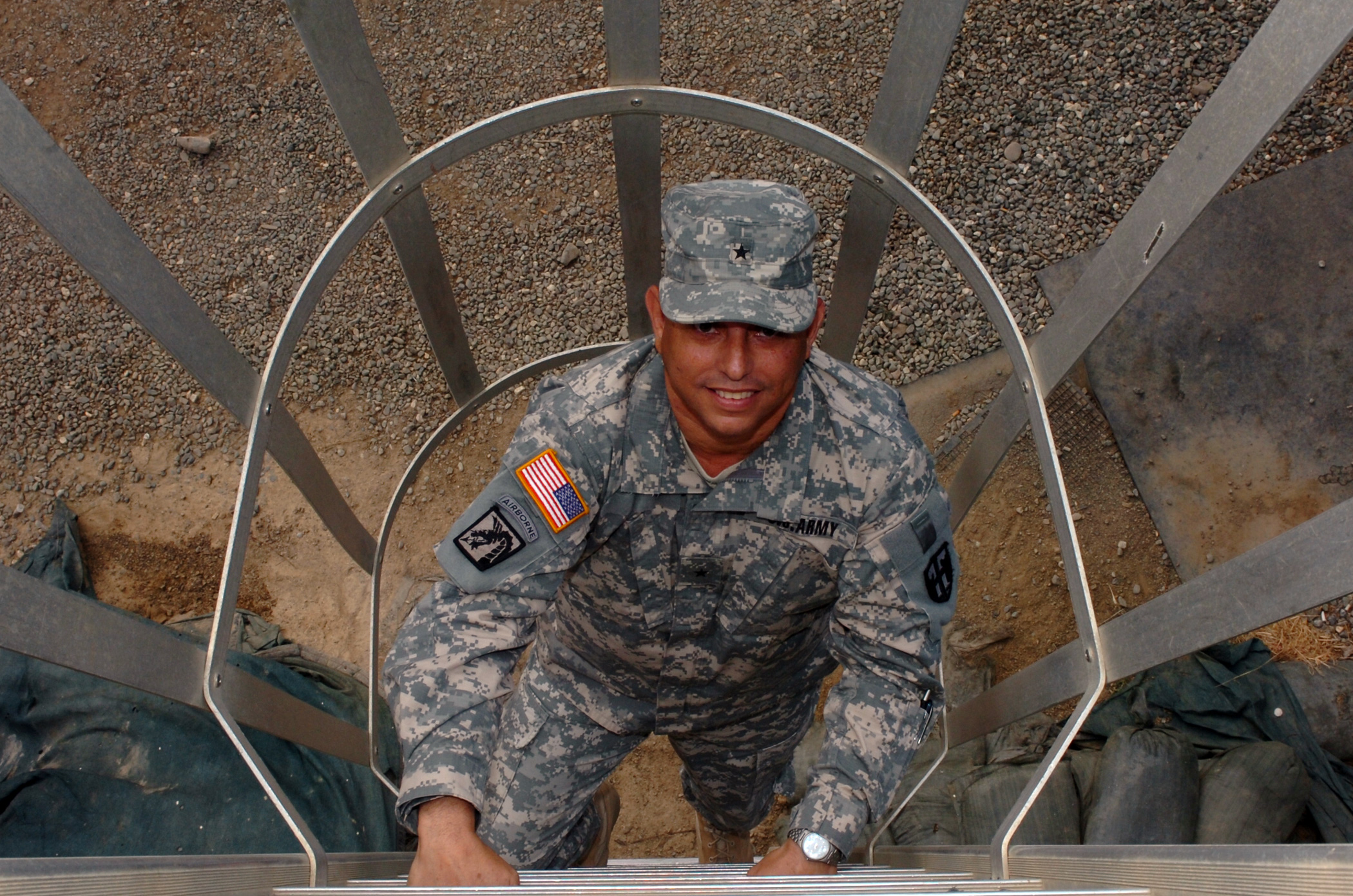
O'Ferrall climbing down a guard tower at Camp Delta (January 2009)

In December 2008, O'Ferrall was deployed and named Deputy Commanding General, Joint Task Force Guantanamo at Guantanamo Bay Naval Base, position in which he currently serves while simultaneously serving as Assistant Adjutant General (Army) and Deputy Commanding General of the Joint Force Headquarters, of San Juan, Puerto Rico. O'Ferrall became the first Hispanic and general officer from the Puerto Rico Army National Guard supporting a joint forces mission of this caliber.

He is responsible for the supervision of over 2150 members from the United States Army, Marines, Navy, Air Force and Coast Guard as well as over 5000 civilian contractors and workers on the base. Among O'Ferrall's responsibilities is to ensure that those under his supervision provide safe, humane, legal and transparent care custody of detained enemy combatants, conduct intelligence collection, analysis and dissemination for protection of detainees and personnel working in Joint Task Force-Guantanamo in support of the Global War on Terrorism, support the Office of Military Commissions to law enforcement and war crime investigations in planning for and on order to respond to Caribbean mass migrations operations.

== Civilian ==
Retired from the Puerto Rico National Guard in 2018. As a civilian O'Ferrall serves on the board of various companies. As of September 2004, is the General Manager of Dade Paper Company's Puerto Rico and Caribbean Division, a supplier of food service disposables, janitorial supplies and equipment located in Cataño, Puerto Rico. Prior to this O'Ferrall had worked in the Pharmaceuticals Division of Johnson & Johnson and as the Business Unit Manager for Industrial Products for Baxter Sales Corporation. He also served as VicePresident/General Manager for Pac-Tech. He is a member of the Alpha Sigma Gamma fraternity. He is married to Maria Del Carmen Vazquez and has four children: Carmen Michelle O'Ferrall (from a previous marriage); Rafael Jr., Gian and Stephanie O'Ferrall.

== Written works ==
Among the written works in which O'Ferrall has participated either as author or co-author are the following:

- "The Transformation of Reserve Component (RC) Modernization: New Options for DOD?" LTC (P) Rafael O'Ferrall, LTC R Alford, LTC K. Riedlera and LT Col C. Rehberg.
- "United States Army War College Article: Reserve Component Equipping: A Critical Element of the National Military Strategy." LTC (P) Rafael O'Ferrall, LTC R Alford, LTC K. Riedler, LT Col C. Rehberg.

== Military awards and decorations ==
Among O'Ferrall's military awards and decorations are the following:

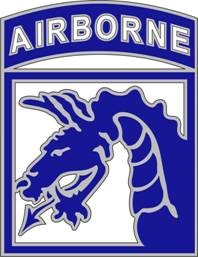
XVIII Airborne Corps Combat Service Identification Badge

Defense Superior Service Medal
Legion of Merit
Meritorious Service Medal (with 2 bronze oak leaf clusters)
Army Commendation Medal
Army Achievement Medal (with 1 bronze oak leaf cluster)
Army Reserve Components Achievement Medal (with 4 bronze Oak Leaf Clusters)
Joint Meritorious Unit Award
Army Superior Unit Award
National Defense Service Medal (with one bronze service star)
Global War on Terrorism Expeditionary Medal
Global War on Terrorism Service Medal
Humanitarian Service Medal
Armed Forces Reserve Medal with gold Hourglass, "M" Device and bronze award numeral 2
Army Service Ribbon
Army Reserve Components Overseas Training Ribbon

== See also ==
- List of Puerto Rican military personnel
