= Andrés Mignucci =

Puerto Rican architect (1957–2022)

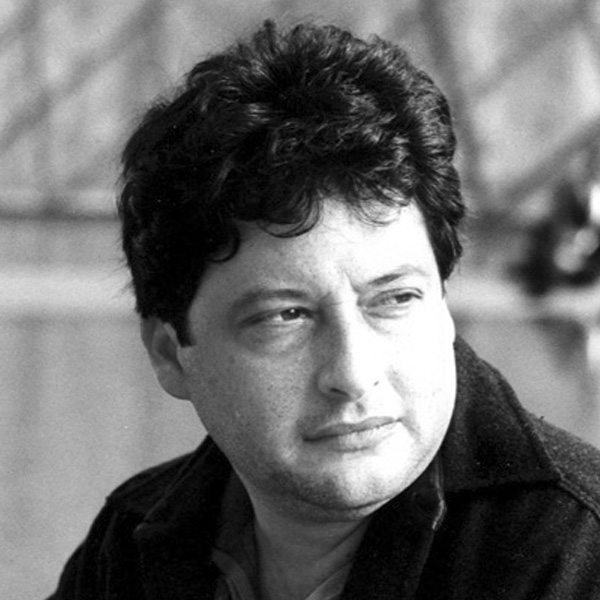
- Born: Andrés Mignucci; December 17, 1957; Ponce, Puerto Rico
- Died: November 21, 2022 (aged 64); San Juan, Puerto Rico
- Known for: Architecture
- Notable work: Santuario Santo Cristo de los Milagros (Carolina), Centro para Puerto Rico (San Juan), Escuela de Bellas Artes, (Mayagüez), La Ventana al Mar (San Juan), Parque de los Niños (San Juan)
- Movement: Public space design
- Awards: Fellow of the American Institute of Architects (FAIA), Henry Klumb Award, National Architecture Prize, ACSA Distinguished Professor Award, Rockefeller Foundation Fellow & Arts and Literary Arts Scholar-in-Residence, Bellagio Center, Italy
- Website: www.amignucci.com

Andrés Mignucci Giannoni FAIA (December 17, 1957 – November 21, 2022) was a Puerto Rican architect and urbanist of Corsican ancestry. His work received recognition for its integration of the disciplines of architecture, urban design and landscape architecture in the creation of public spaces with a sense of place, human scale, and environmental responsibility. In 2005 Andrés Mignucci was elected to the College of Fellows of the American Institute of Architects. In 2012, he was awarded the Henry Klumb Award by the Puerto Rico College of Architects. In 2019, Mignucci received the Distinguished Professor Award by the Association of Collegiate Schools of Architecture, and was named Arts and Literary Arts Scholar in Residence at the Rockefeller Foundation's Bellagio Center in Bellagio, Italy.

Mignucci died in San Juan on 21 November 2022, aged 64. His legacy was honored on 21 December 2022 by the Colegio de Arquitectos y Arquitectos Paisajistas de Puerto Rico and by the Puerto Rico chapter of the American Institute of Architects.

== Education and career ==
Mignucci studied architecture at the University of Wisconsin–Milwaukee (BS Arch (Honors), 1979) and the Massachusetts Institute of Technology (MIT) (M.Arch., 1982).

He trained as an urban designer with Stephen Carr and Kevin A. Lynch in Cambridge, Massachusetts (1983–86) and as an architect with German architect Erich Schneider-Wessling (1986–88). Mignucci's main contribution has been in the field of public space design. His major projects include Parque de los Niños and Parque de Santurce, two large scale landscape restoration projects along the Caño de Martin Peña; the El Condado public space system, which includes the Plaza Antonia Quiñones, La Ventana al Mar, Plaza Las Nereidas and Parque del Indio; the restoration of Luis Muñoz Rivera Park, San Juan's oldest public space; and the Plaza de Isabela, the town square in the northwest municipality of Isabela.

His publications include: Pintura para un piso específico with artist María de Mater O'Neill, Supports: Housing and City with Dutch theorist N. John Habraken published by Universitat Politécnica de Catalunya in 2009. "Jesús Eduardo Amaral, Arquitecto", a monograph on Jesús Eduardo Amaral, one of the principal figures of mid-twentieth century architecture in Puerto Rico and founder in 1966 of the School of Architecture at the University of Puerto Rico and Conversations with Form: A Workbook for Students of Architecture co-authored with N. John Habraken and Jonathan Teicher), (Routledge, 2014).

Andrés Mignucci has taught architectural design and theory at the Universidad Politécnica de Puerto Rico, at the School of Architecture of the University of Puerto Rico, and as visiting professor at the Escuela Superior Técnica de Arquitectura in Barcelona (ETSAB) in 2009, at Miami University as Maxfield Lecturer in 2012, and at the Aarhus School of Architecture in Aarhus, Denmark as 2016 Velux Visiting Professor.

== Honors ==
Mignucci was awarded the National Architecture Prize in 2001 for the Parque de los Niños (Children's Park) in Bayamon, Puerto Rico and in 2002 for the School of Fine Arts in Mayagüez, Puerto Rico. In 2004-2005, his landmark public space project, La Ventana al Mar, won awards in the American Institute of Architects Puerto Rico Chapter Design Awards, the Puerto Rico Architecture Biennale, the Miami + Beach Architecture Biennale (bronze medal) and the Iberoamerican Architecture Biennale held in Madrid, Spain.

- ROCKEFELLER FOUNDATION FELLOW & SCHOLAR-IN-RESIDENCE / Bellagio Center, Bellagio, Italy, 2019
- DISTINGUISHED PROFESSOR AWARD / Association of Collegiate Schools of Architecture, 2019
- HENRY KLUMB AWARD / Colegio de Arquitectos y Arquitectos Paisajistas de Puerto Rico, 2012
- FELLOW / American Institute of Architects, Washington DC, USA, 2005
- FELLOW / Institute for Urban Design New York City, NY, USA, 2005
- Chandler Prize for Excellence in Architectural Design Boston Society of Architects, 1982
- President's Fellowship University of Puerto Rico, Río Piedras, Puerto Rico, 1979–81

== Awards ==
Honorable Mention: Parque Luis Muñoz Marín, XIV PR Architectural Biennale, 2016

Honorable Mention: A Lakou for Haiti, AIA Puerto Rico Design Awards, 2009

Bronze Medal: Violeta 150, Miami + Beach Architectural Biennale, 2009

First Prize, Parque Metropolitano de Santiago, Santo Domingo Architectural Biennale, 2006

Bronze Medal: La Ventana al Mar, Miami + Beach Architectural Biennale, 2005

Finalist: La Ventana al Mar IV Iberoamerican Architectural Biennale, 2004

Landscape Design Award: Parque de los Niños, Martinique Architectural Biennale, 2002

Premio Nacional de Arquitectura: Escuela Bellas Artes, VII PR Architectural Biennale, 2002

Premio Nacional de Arquitectura: Parque de los Niños, VI PR Architectural Biennale, 2001

Honor Award: Parque de los Niños, AIA Puerto Rico Design Awards, 2001

Urbe Prize for Excellence in Architecture: Parque de los Niños, Urbe Design Awards, 2001

Honor Award: Casa Vivas, AIA Puerto Rico Design Awards, 1997

Honor Award: Casa sobre una Hondonada, AIA Puerto Rico Design Awards, 1990

First Prize: Bayer Informationzentrüm, (with Erich Schneider-Wessling) International Design Competition, Köln, Germany, 1986

== Books ==
Andrés Mignucci, Bruno Stagno: An Architecture for the Tropics, A+Editores, San Juan:2019.

N. John Habraken, Andrés Mignucci & Jonathan Teicher, Conversations with Form: A Workbook for Students of Architecture, Routledge, London:2014.

Andrés Mignucci (A. Hurley, trans.), [Con]texts: Parque Muñoz Rivera and the Puerto Rico Supreme Court, Rama Judicial de Puerto Rico, San Juan:2012.

Andrés Mignucci, [Con]textos: El Parque Muñoz Rivera y el Tribunal Supremo de Puerto Rico, Rama Judicial de Puerto Rico, San Juan:2011.

Andrés Mignucci, Urbanism in Puerto Rico 1929-1973, in J. Lizardi & M. Schwegmann Ambivalent Spaces, Ediciones Callejón, San Juan:2011.

Andrés Mignucci, Jesús Eduardo Amaral, Arquitecto, Colegio de Arquitectos y arquitectos Paisajistas de Puerto Rico, San Juan:2011.

Andrés Mignucci, Arquitectura Contemporanea en Puerto Rico 1976-1992, 2nd Edition, A+Editores, San Juan:2009.

Andrés Mignucci & M.M. O'Neill, Pintura para un Piso Específico, A+Editores, San Juan:2009.

Andrés Mignucci & N.J. Habraken, Supports: Housing and City, Actar, Barcelona:2009.

Andrés Mignucci, Arquitectura Contemporanea en Puerto Rico 1976-1992, 1st ed., AIA Puerto Rico, San Juan:1992.

Jorge Rigau, Andrés Mignucci & Emilio Martinez, Arquitectura Dominicana 1890-1930, AIA Puerto Rico, San Juan, 1990.

Andrés Mignucci, “Inhabiting Shadows: Notes on the Tropics as Place” in Places, Vol. 12 / No. 3, Spring 1999, pp. 38–42.

Andrés Mignucci, “Reclaiming Ballajá” in Places, vol.5, no. 2, 1988, pp. 3–17.

Habraken, N.J. with Aldrete-Hass, J.A., Chow, R., Hille, T., Krugmeier, P., Lampkin, M., Mallows, A., Mignucci, A., Takase, Y., Weller, K., and Yokouchi, T., The Grunfeld Variations, A Methodological Approach to the Design of Urban Tissues, Laboratory of Architecture & Planning, MIT, Whalen Press, 1980.

== Works ==
=== Buildings and Projects ===
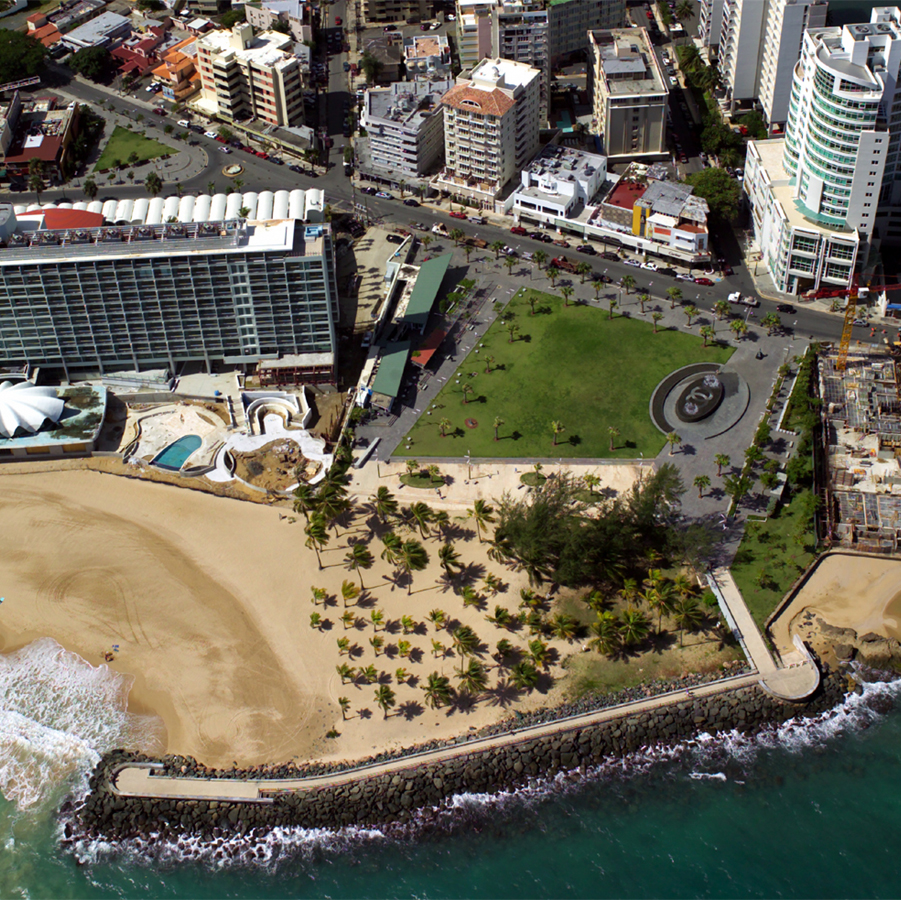

La Ventana al Mar (2004) - Bronze Medal: Bienal de Miami + Beach, Miami (2005); Finalist: La Ventana al Mar IV Ibero-American Architecture Biennale, Madrid, Spain (2004); Mention of Honor: AIA Puerto Rico Design Awards (2004).

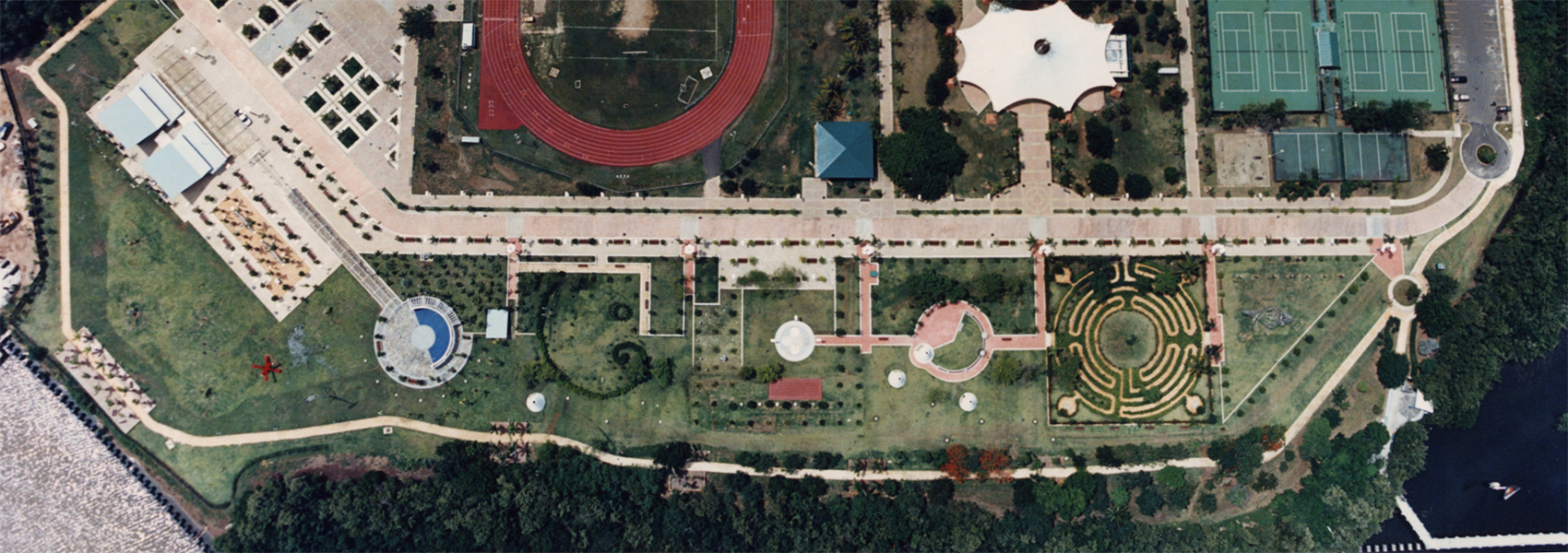

Parque de los Niños / Children's Park (2000) - Grand Prize / Premio Nacional de Arquitectura: VI Puerto Rico Architecture Biennale (2001); Honor Award: AIA-Puerto Rico Design Awards (2001); Prix du Paysage: Martinique Architecture Biennale (2002); URBE Award for Excellence in Architecture (2001) .

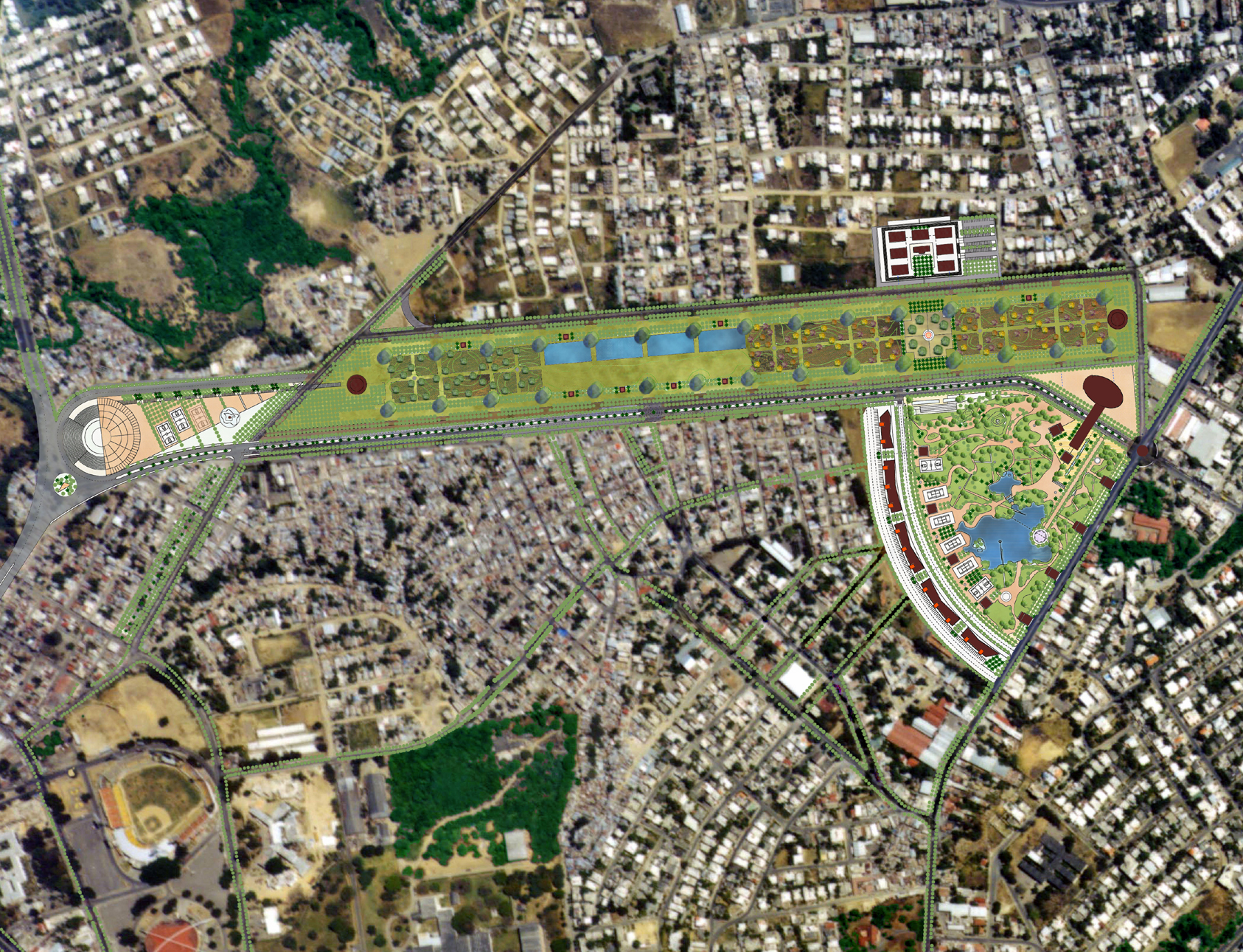

Parque Metropolitano de Santiago (with Gustavo Moré) (2002) - First Prize: International Design Competition, Santiago, Dominican Republic (2002); First Prize-Urban Design: Bienal de Arquitectura de Santo Domingo (2006).

== See also ==
- List of Puerto Ricans
- Corsican immigration to Puerto Rico
- Architecture of Puerto Rico
