= Demographics of Puerto Rico =

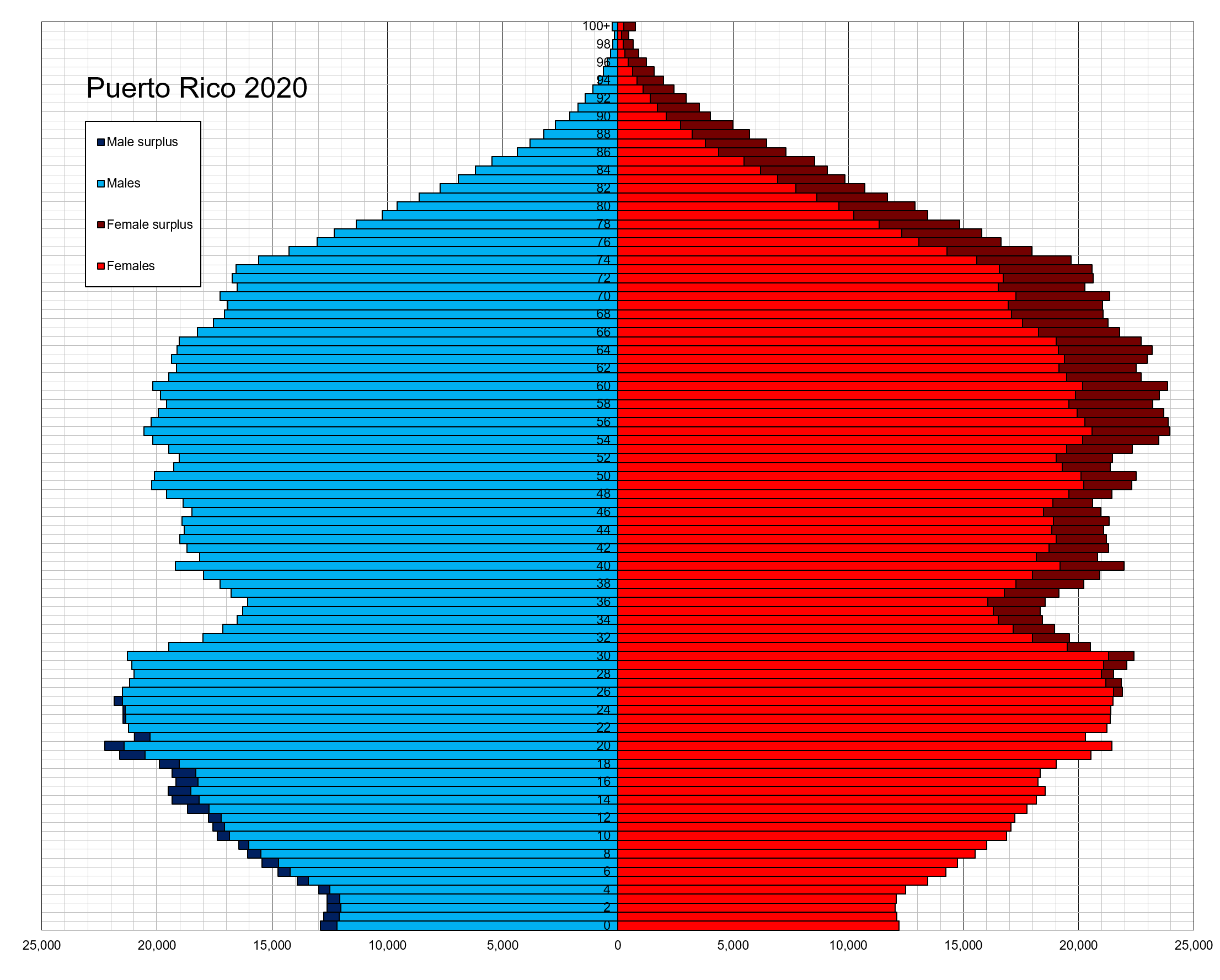
- Puerto Rico population pyramid in 2020

- Population change timeline (1960–2017)

- Population density
- Population (2021): 3,263,584
- Male population (2010): 1,785,171
- Female population (2010): 1,940,618
- Population growth: -1.32%
- Birth rate (2022 est.): 5.9/1,000
- Death rate (2022 est.): 10.9/1,000
- Infant mortality rate: 8.24/1,000
- Life expectancy: 78.29 years
- Nationality: American
- Demographic bureaux: 2010 United States census

The population of Puerto Rico has been shaped by native American settlement, European colonization, especially under the Spanish Empire, slavery and economic migration. Demographic features of the population of Puerto Rico include population density, ethnicity, education of the populace, health of the populace, economic status, religious affiliations and other aspects of the population.

== Population size and structure ==
At the 2020 census Puerto Rico had a population of 3.3 million, down from 3.7 million in 2010. The highest population was reached around the year 2000, at 3.8 million, and has been decreasing since, due to low fertility and emigration.

Historical population
Year	Pop.	±% p.a.
1765	44,883	—
1775	70,250	+4.58%
1800	155,426	+3.23%
1815	220,892	+2.37%
1832	350,051	+2.75%
1846	447,914	+1.78%
1860	583,308	+1.90%
1877	731,648	+1.34%
1887	798,565	+0.88%
1899	953,243	+1.49%
1910	1,118,012	+1.46%
1920	1,299,809	+1.52%
1930	1,543,913	+1.74%
1940	1,869,255	+1.93%
1950	2,210,703	+1.69%
1960	2,349,544	+0.61%
1970	2,712,033	+1.45%
1980	3,196,520	+1.66%
1990	3,522,037	+0.97%
2000	3,808,610	+0.79%
2010	3,725,789	−0.22%
2020	3,285,874	−1.25%
2025	3,184,835	−0.62%
The Spanish Government conducted the censuses from 1765 to 1887.; The United States War Department took the census in 1899.; 1910–2020

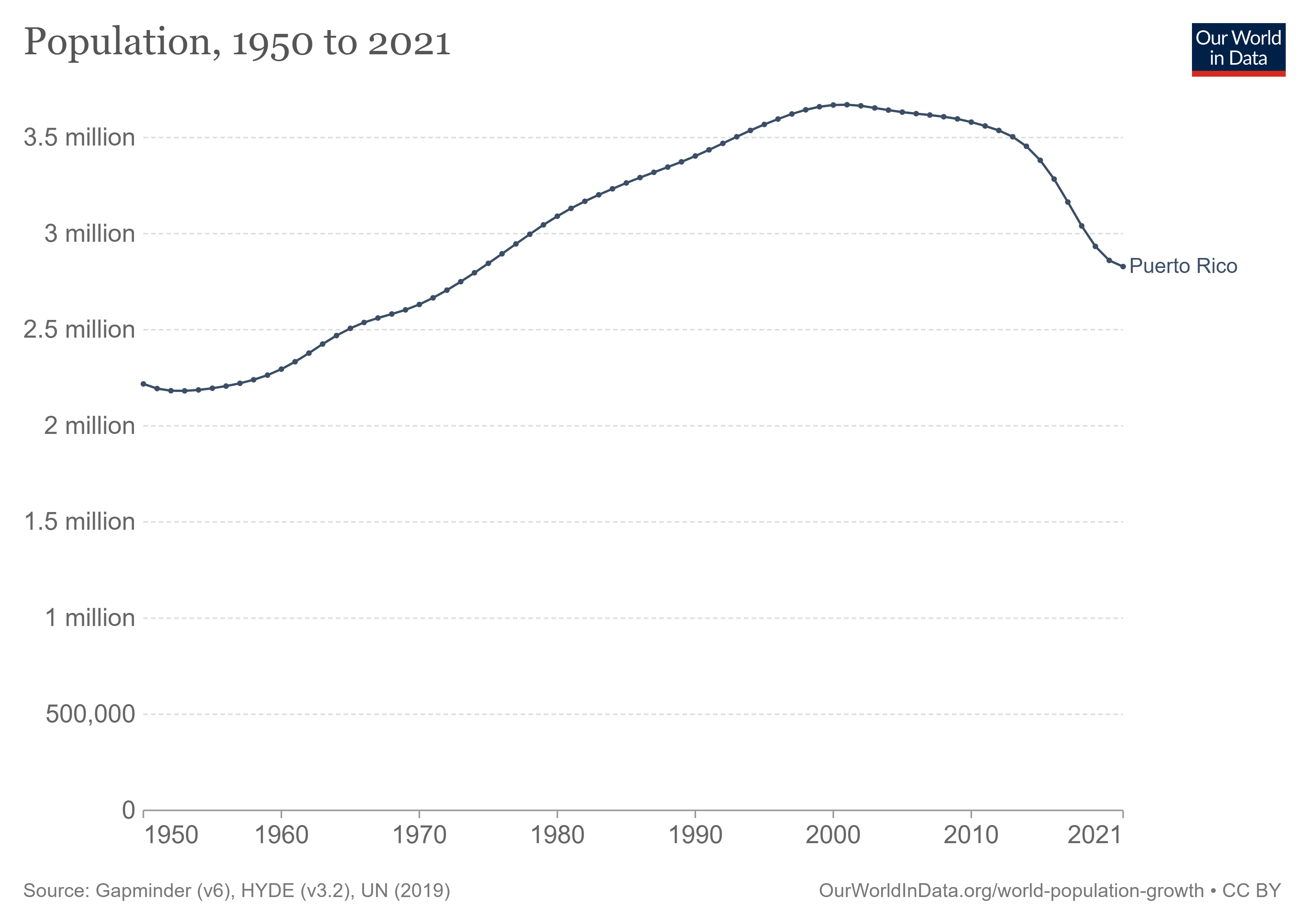
Puerto Rico's population, 1950 to 2021

== Migration ==
Sometime between 400 B.C. and A.D. 100, the Arawak group of Amerindians inhabited Puerto Rico. Around A.D. 600, the Arawaks no longer lived on the island, perhaps because they had integrated with another culture or perhaps because they had been killed by illness. By A.D. 1000, the indigenous Taíno inhabited the island. They called the island Borikén, which is popularly said to mean "land of the valiant one".

This is where the alternative name for Puerto Rico, Borinquen, comes from. Since the late 18th century Puerto Ricans have called themselves some variation of boricua, borincano and borinqueño to embrace their indigenous identity. In the 15th century, the Carib lived on nearby islands and periodically invaded Taíno villages.

=== Historical Immigration ===
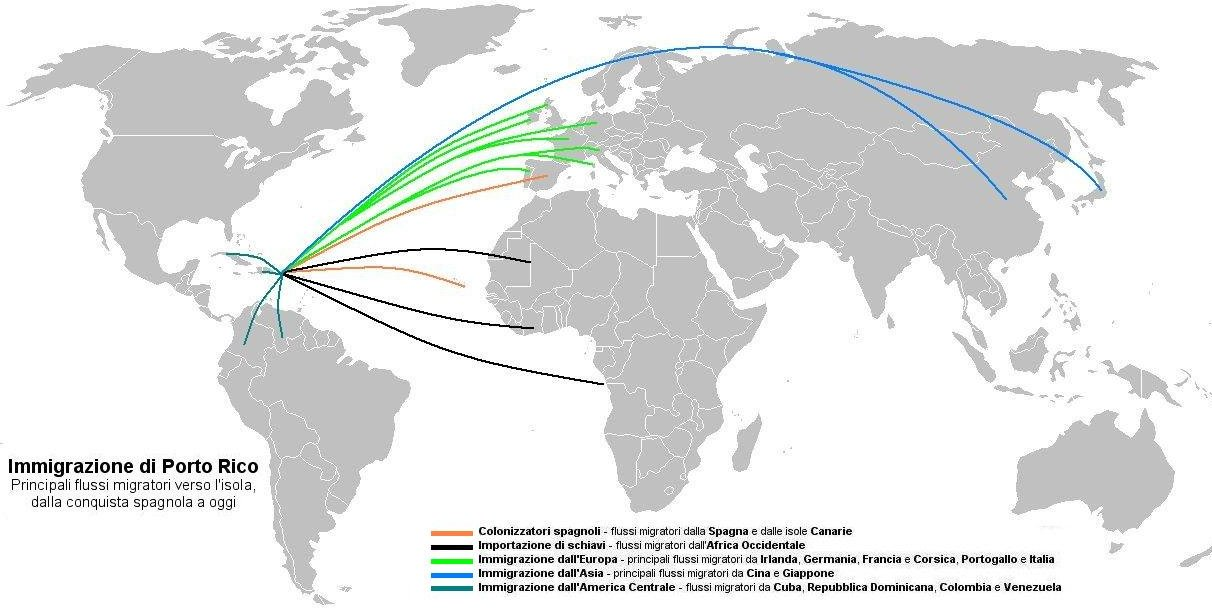
Immigration to Puerto Rico

The Spanish conquered the island, assuming government in 1508, colonized it, and assumed hegemony over the natives. The Taíno population dwindled due to disease, tribal warfare, and forced labor, so the Spanish began importing large numbers of slaves from Africa. Spanish men arrived on the island disproportionately to Spanish women. African and Taíno women would sometimes marry them, resulting in a mixed tri-racial ethnicity.

In the late 18th century, the number of African slaves began to dwindle on the island. The 1833 British ban on slavery resulted in slave raids on Puerto Rico. Many slaves also escaped to neighboring islands.

In the 19th century, large numbers of immigrants from Spain, and numerous Spaniards living in former Spanish colonies in South America, arrived in Puerto Rico (See Spanish immigration to Puerto Rico). Large numbers of Canary Islanders (Isleños) arrived in great numbers to the island. Their influence can be seen today in Puerto Rico's culture, cuisine and most notably in the variety of Spanish that is spoken in Puerto Rico.

Although the vast majority of settlers came from Spain, Catholics from France, Ireland, Corsica, Italy, Germany and other European countries were also granted land by Spain as one of the provisions of the Real Cédula de Gracias de 1815 (Royal Decree of Graces of 1815). These immigrants were allowed to settle on the island, with a certain amount of free land and enslaved persons granted to them. In return, they had to profess fealty to the Spanish Crown.

In the early 20th century Jews began to settle in Puerto Rico. The first large group of Jews to settle in Puerto Rico were European refugees fleeing German–occupied Europe in the late 1930s. Puerto Rico's economic boom of the 1950s attracted a considerable number of Jewish families from the U.S. mainland, who were joined after 1959 by an influx of Jewish emigres from Fidel Castro's Cuba.

The mass immigration that occurred during the 19th century helped the population grow from 155,000 in 1800, to almost 1,000,000 in 1900.

=== Modern Immigration ===
Puerto Rico has continued to receive immigrants in the present-day, especially coming from neighboring countries. In the 2020 census, by ancestry or birth, there were 53,677 Dominicans, 11,701 Cubans, 5,628 Spaniards, 5,010 Colombians, 4,975 Mexicans, 3,131 Venezuelans, 1,366 Peruvians, and 1,331 Argentineans. People who self identified as Hispanic, Latino, Spanish, Spanish American, and Afro-Latino numbered 8,141 and may be of mixed-Hispanic background, and all other Latin American origin groups numbered 6,344.

In 2020, there were 29,913 English, 9,700 Italians, 6,307, Germans, 5,024 French, 4,561 Irish, 1,361 Portuguese, and 8,556 all other European-origin groups, a large portion is made up of white Americans of such ancestries. There were 8,417 African Americans, 2,873 Asian Indians, 2,462 Chinese, and all other groups numbering about 6,000.

Some illegal immigrants, particularly from Haiti, Dominican Republic, and Cuba use Puerto Rico as a temporary stop-over point to get to the US mainland. In 2020, non-hispanic people made up 1.1% of the population of Puerto Rico, the majority of which are made up of U.S. citizens especially White Americans, and to a lesser degree Black Americans. Some non-Puerto Rican Hispanics are U.S.-born. Ethnic Puerto Ricans numbered 3,139,035, representing 95.5% of Puerto Rico's population. Some Puerto Ricans engage in Circular migration.

=== Emigration ===
Emigration has been a major part of Puerto Rico's recent history. Starting in the post-World War II period waves of Puerto Ricans moved to the continental United States, particularly to New York City, Yonkers, Buffalo, Rochester New York; Newark, Jersey City, Paterson, and Camden, New Jersey.

Other destinations include Providence, Rhode Island; Boston, Springfield, Massachusetts; Hartford and New Haven, Connecticut; Cleveland, Ohio; Orlando, Jacksonville, and Tampa, Miami, Florida; Philadelphia, Allentown, Reading, Pennsylvania; and Chicago, Illinois. This continued even as Puerto Rico's economy improved and its birth rate declined.

== Vital statistics ==
=== Structure of the population ===
Population Estimates by Sex and Age Group (01.VII.2012) (Including armed forces stationed in the area. Based on the results of the 2010 Population Census.):

Age group	Male	Female	Total	%
Total	1 755 479	1 911 605	3 667 084	100
0–4	107 000	102 597	209 597	5.72
5–9	116 188	109 665	225 853	6.16
10–14	129 722	123 006	252 728	6.89
15–19	138 646	132 250	270 896	7.39
20–24	134 894	131 768	266 662	7.27
25–29	112 981	117 257	230 238	6.28
30–34	115 030	125 281	240 311	6.55
35–39	111 971	121 837	233 808	6.38
40–44	113 223	123 276	236 499	6.45
45–49	114 114	129 441	243 555	6.64
50–54	109 550	127 211	236 761	6.46
55–59	103 031	123 108	226 139	6.17
60–64	96 256	115 745	212 001	5.78
65–69	86 858	104 308	191 166	5.21
70–74	64 745	79 593	144 338	3.94
75–79	46 652	60 431	107 083	2.92
80–84	29 398	41 911	71 309	1.94
85+	25 220	42 290	68 140	1.86
Age group	Male	Female	Total	Percent
0–14	352 910	335 268	688 178	18.77
15–64	1 149 696	1 247 174	2 396 870	65.36
65+	252 873	329 163	582 036	15.87

Population Estimates by Sex and Age Group (01.VII.2019) (Including armed forces stationed in the area. Post-censal estimates.):

Age group	Male	Female	Total	%
Total	1 515 721	1 677 973	3 193 694	100
0–4	60 020	57 462	117 482	3.68
5–9	79 847	77 814	157 661	4.94
10–14	92 917	89 847	182 764	5.72
15–19	103 020	98 596	201 616	6.31
20–24	109 920	106 565	216 485	6.78
25–29	109 775	110 150	219 925	6.89
30–34	89 738	95 503	185 241	5.80
35–39	89 257	100 245	189 502	5.93
40–44	94 166	104 715	198 881	6.23
45–49	96 796	107 356	204 152	6.39
50–54	98 923	112 980	211 903	6.64
55–59	100 375	118 921	219 296	6.87
60–64	95 717	113 413	209 130	6.55
65-69	85 684	104 249	189 933	5.95
70-74	79 286	97 271	176 557	5.53
75-79	57 755	73 571	131 326	4.11
80-84	38 724	51 920	90 644	2.84
85+	33 801	57 395	91 196	2.86
Age group	Male	Female	Total	Percent
0–14	232 784	225 123	457 907	14.34
15–64	987 687	1 068 444	2 056 131	64.38
65+	295 250	384 406	679 656	21.28

View source data.
View source data.
View source data.
View source data.

Puerto Rico's vital statistics 1910–2023
	Average population	Live births	Deaths	Natural change	Crude birth rate (per 1000)	Crude death rate (per 1000)	Natural change (per 1000)	Crude migration change (per 1000)	TFR
1910	1,118,000	37,600	26,600	11,000	33.6	23.8	9.8		
1911	1,140,000	39,100	26,600	12,500	34.3	23.3	11.0	8.5	
1912	1,150,000	40,400	26,900	13,500	35.1	23.4	11.7	-3.1	
1913	1,170,000	42,700	23,200	19,500	36.5	19.8	16.7	0.4	
1914	1,190,000	47,400	22,300	25,100	39.8	18.7	21.1	-4.4	
1915	1,210,000	45,000	25,000	20,000	37.2	20.7	16.5	0	
1916	1,230,000	43,200	29,400	13,800	35.1	23.9	11.2	5.1	
1917	1,250,000	44,300	38,600	5,700	35.4	30.9	4.5	-30.1	
1918	1,260,000	51,500	38,900	12,600	40.9	30.9	10.0	-2.1	
1919	1,280,000	46,000	30,300	15,700	35.9	23.7	12.2	3.4	
1920	1,300,000	49,900	29,600	20,300	38.4	22.8	15.6	-0.2	
1921	1,320,000	50,600	29,700	20,900	38.3	22.5	15.8	-0.7	
1922	1,350,000	50,500	29,400	21,100	37.4	21.8	15.6	6.7	
1923	1,370,000	50,700	26,900	23,800	37.0	19.6	17.4	-2.8	
1924	1,400,000	53,600	27,200	26,400	38.3	19.4	18.9	2.6	
1925	1,420,000	52,700	33,200	19,500	37.1	23.4	13.7	0.4	
1926	1,450,000	55,500	32,300	23,200	38.3	22.3	16.0	4.8	
1927	1,470,000	58,200	33,500	24,700	39.6	22.8	16.8	-3.2	
1928	1,500,000	52,900	29,700	23,200	35.3	19.8	15.5	4.6	
1929	1,520,000	52,300	40,700	11,600	34.4	26.8	7.6	5.6	
1930	1,544,000	54,300	31,500	22,800	35.2	20.4	14.8	0.8	
1931	1,580,000	71,600	35,200	36,400	45.3	22.3	23.0	-0.3	
1932	1,615,000	66,400	35,500	30,900	41.1	22.0	19.1	2.6	
1933	1,647,000	61,600	36,700	24,900	37.4	22.3	15.1	4.4	
1934	1,679,000	65,595	31,684	33,911	39.1	18.9	20.2	-1.2	
1935	1,710,000	67,585	30,748	36,837	39.5	18.0	21.5	-3.5	
1936	1,743,000	68,962	34,790	34,172	39.6	20.0	19.6	-0.7	
1937	1,777,000	67,919	37,132	30,787	38.2	20.9	17.3	1.8	
1938	1,810,000	69,823	33,870	35,953	38.6	18.7	19.9	-1.7	
1939	1,844,000	73,044	32,631	40,413	39.6	17.7	21.9	-3.5	
1940	1,879,000	72,388	34,477	37,911	38.5	18.3	20.2	-1.6	
1941	1,926,000	76,130	35,551	40,579	39.5	18.5	21.1	3.4	
1942	1,973,000	78,405	32,218	46,187	39.7	16.3	23.4	0.4	
1943	2,012,000	77,304	29,065	48,239	38.4	14.4	24.0	-4.7	
1944	2,037,000	82,534	29,843	52,691	40.5	14.7	25.9	-13.8	
1945	2,070,000	86,680	28,837	57,843	41.9	13.9	27.9	-12.2	
1946	2,100,000	88,421	27,517	60,904	42.1	13.1	29.0	-14.9	
1947	2,149,000	91,305	25,407	65,898	42.5	11.8	30.7	-8.0	
1948	2,187,000	87,809	26,209	61,600	40.2	12.0	28.2	-11.0	
1949	2,197,000	85,625	23,389	62,236	39.0	10.6	28.3	-23.9	
1950	2,218,000	86,038	21,895	64,143	38.8	9.9	27.9	-19.6	
1951	2,210,000	84,076	22,374	61,702	38.0	10.1	27.9	-31.4	
1952	2,212,000	80,438	20,480	59,958	36.3	9.3	27.1	-26.2	
1953	2,221,000	77,754	17,972	59,782	35.0	8.1	26.9	-23.0	
1954	2,233,000	78,008	16,783	61,225	34.9	7.5	27.4	-22.2	
1955	2,247,000	79,221	16,243	62,978	35.2	7.2	28.0	-21.9	
1956	2,262,000	78,177	16,607	61,570	34.5	7.3	27.2	--20.7	
1957	2,279,000	76,068	16,022	60,046	33.3	7.0	26.3	-19.0	
1958	2,299,000	76,128	16,099	60,029	33.1	7.0	26.1	-17.6	
1959	2,323,000	74,933	15,870	59,063	32.2	6.8	25.4	-15.3	
1960	2,356,000	76,015	15,841	60,174	32.2	6.7	25.5	-11.7	
1961	2,396,000	75,563	16,361	59,202	31.5	6.8	24.7	-8.2	
1962	2,442,000	76,677	16,575	60,102	31.3	6.8	24.6	-5.9	
1963	2,491,000	77,382	17,386	59,996	31.0	7.0	24.0	-4.5	
1964	2,538,000	78,837	18,556	60,281	31.0	7.3	23.7	-5.3	
1965	2,578,000	79,586	17,719	61,867	30.8	6.9	24.0	-8.6	
1966	2,609,000	75,735	17,506	58,229	29.0	6.7	22.3	-10.6	
1967	2,634,000	70,755	16,780	53,975	26.8	6.4	20.4	-11.1	
1968	2,656,000	67,989	17,481	50,508	25.5	6.6	19.0	-10.8	
1969	2,680,000	67,577	17,669	49,908	25.1	6.6	18.6	-9.8	
1970	2,710,000	67,438	18,080	49,358	24.8	6.7	18.2	-7.2	2.69
1971	2,746,000	71,114	18,144	52,970	25.8	6.6	19.2	-6.3	2.82
1972	2,787,000	68,914	19,011	49,903	24.7	6.8	17.9	-3,2	2.67
1973	2,833,000	68,821	19,257	49,564	24.2	6.8	17.5	-1.3	2.67
1974	2,882,000	70,082	19,490	50,592	24.3	6.7	17.5	-0.6	2.65
1975	2,932,000	69,691	19,073	50,618	23.7	6.5	17.2	-0.2	2.61
1976	2,984,000	72,883	19,893	52,990	24.4	6.7	17.7	-0.3	2.77
1977	3,037,000	75,151	19,895	55,256	24.7	6.5	18.2	-0.8	2.93
1978	3,090,000	75,066	19,876	55,190	24.2	6.4	17.8	-0.7	2.86
1979	3,141,000	73,781	20,390	53,391	23.4	6.5	17.0	-0.8	2.77
1980	3,188,000	73,060	20,486	52,574	22.9	6.4	16.4	-1.8	2.75
1981	3,230,000	71,365	21,197	50,168	22.0	6.5	15.5	-2.6	2.64
1982	3,269,000	69,336	21,522	47,814	21.2	6.6	14.6	-2.7	2.57
1983	3,305,000	65,742	21,499	44,243	19.8	6.5	13.4	-2.5	2.44
1984	3,338,000	63,321	21,733	41,588	18.9	6.5	12.4	-2.6	2.37
1985	3,370,000	63,629	23,194	40,435	18.8	6.9	12.0	-2.5	2.34
1986	3,400,000	63,551	23,387	40,164	18.6	6.9	11.8	-3.0	2.31
1987	3,429,000	64,393	23,954	40,439	18.7	7.0	11.8	-3.4	2.27
1988	3,457,000	64,081	25,123	38,958	18.5	7.2	11.2	-3.2	2.27
1989	3,487,000	66,692	25,987	40,705	19.1	7.4	11.6	-3.1	2.36
1990	3,518,000	66,565	26,138	40,407	18.9	7.4	11.5	-2.7	2.35
1991	3,552,000	64,498	26,321	38,177	18.2	7.4	10.7	-1.2	2.20
1992	3,587,000	64,471	27,389	37,082	18.0	7.6	10.3	-0.2	2.18
1993	3,623,000	65,258	28,493	36,765	18.0	7.9	10.1	-1.2	2.14
1994	3,657,000	64,341	28,428	35,913	17.6	7.8	9.8	-0.5	2.08
1995	3,690,000	63,502	30,184	33,318	17.2	8.2	9.0	-0.1	2.08
1996	3,719,000	63,259	29,871	33,388	17.0	8.0	9.0	-1.2	2.06
1997	3,747,000	64,214	29,119	35,095	17.1	7.8	9.4	-1.9	2.13
1998	3,770,000	60,518	29,990	30,528	16.1	8.0	8.1	-2.0	1.98
1999	3,787,000	59,684	29,145	30,539	15.8	7.7	8.1	-3.6	1.94
2000	3,797,000	59,460	28,550	30,910	15.7	7.5	8.1	-5.5	1.93
2001	3,799,000	55,982	28,794	27,188	14.7	7.6	7.2	-6.6	1.85
2002	3,795,000	52,871	28,098	24,773	13.9	7.4	6.5	-7.6	1.77
2003	3,785,000	50,803	28,356	22,447	13.4	7.5	5.9	-8.5	1.71
2004	3,773,000	51,239	29,066	22,173	13.6	7.7	5.9	-9.0	1.74
2005	3,761,000	50,687	29,702	20,985	13.5	7.9	5.6	-8.7	1.73
2006	3,750,000	48,597	28,206	20,391	13.0	7.5	5.4	-8.3	1.67
2007	3,739,000	46,642	29,169	17,473	12.5	7.8	4.7	-7.6	1.64
2008	3,729,000	45,620	29,050	16,570	11.5	7.8	3.7	-7.1	1.62
2009	3,719,000	44,773	29,005	15,768	11.3	7.8	3.5	-6.9	1.59
2010	3,722,000	42,153	29,153	13,000	11.3	7.8	3.5	-2.7	1.62
2011	3,679,000	41,080	29,742	11,338	11.2	8.1	3.1	-14.6	1.60
2012	3,634,000	38,900	29,448	9,228	10.7	8.1	2.5	14.7	1.54
2013	3,593,000	38,986	29,009	9,977	10.9	8.1	2.8	-14.0	1.47
2014	3,535,000	34,485	30,224	4,261	9.8	8.5	1.2	-17.3	1.43
2015	3,474,000	31,157	28,279	2,878	9.0	8.1	0.9	-18.1	1.34
2016	3,411,000	27,406	29,613	−2,207	8.3	8.7	−0.4	-17.5	1.24
2017	3,337,000	23,582	30,977	−7,395	7.3	9.3	−2.0	-19.5	1.10
2018	3,193,354	21,424	29,109	−7,685	6.7	9.1	−2.4	-40.7	1.04
2019	3,193,694	20,409	29,638	-9,229	6.4	9.3	−2.9	3.0	0.98
2020	3,285,874	18,933	31,679	-12,746	5.8	9.6	−3.8	32.9	0.92
2021	3,262,731	18,833	33,001	-14,168	5.9	10.1	-4.2	-2.5	0.91
2022	3,220,148	19,112	35,466	-16,354	5.9	10.9	-5.0	-7.8	0.91
2023	3,203,794	18,641	34,253	-15,612	5.8	10.7	-4.9	-0.2	0.90
2024	3,202,521	18,128	33,091	-14,945	5.7	10.3	-4.6		0.87
2025	3,184,835	18,003	32,518	–13,715	5.7	10.2	–4.5		

=== Current vital statistics ===
Period	Live births	Deaths	Natural increase
January - June 2023	8,908	17,108	-8,200
January - June 2024	8,477	16,812	-8,335
Difference	▼ -431 (-4.83%)	▼ -296 (-1.73%)	▼ -135

=== Life expectancy ===
Period	Life expectancy in Years	Period	Life expectancy in Years
1950–1955	63.5	1985–1990	74.6
1955–1960	67.9	1990–1995	73.8
1960–1965	69.1	1995–2000	74.9
1965–1970	70.7	2000–2005	76.8
1970–1975	72.4	2005–2010	77.8
1975–1980	73.5	2010–2015	79.2
1980–1985	73.9		

Source: UN World Population Prospects

== Ethnic groups ==
Census racial composition of the Puerto Rican population since 1802 (self-identification since 1960):
Year	White%	Non-White%
1802	42.0	58.0
1812	40.8	59.2
1820	39.4	60.6
1830	45.1	54.9
1877	52.3	47.7
1887	53.5	46.5
1897	64.3	35.7
1899	61.8	38.2
1910	64.5	35.5
1920	72.0	28.0
1930	73.3	26.7
1935	75.2	24.8
1940	76.0	24.0
1950	79.7	20.3
2000	80.5	19.5
2010	75.8	24.2
2020	17.1	82.9

=== Race and ethnicity ===
==== Background ====
In the late 1700s, Puerto Rico had laws like the Regla del Sacar or Gracias al Sacar where a person of mixed ancestry could be considered legally white so long as they could prove that at least one person per generation in the last four generations had also been legally white. Therefore, people of mixed ancestry with known white lineage were classified as white, the opposite of the "one-drop rule" in the United States.

A strong wave of European immigration and the large importation of slaves from Africa increased the population of Puerto Rico sixfold during the 19th century. No major immigration wave occurred during the 20th century.

The federal Naturalization Act, signed into law on March 26, 1790, by President Washington stated that immigrants to the United States had to be White according to the definition under the British Common Law, which the United States inherited. The legal definition of Whiteness differed greatly from White Society's informal definition, thus Jews, Romani Peoples, Middle Eastern Peoples and those of the Indian Subcontinent were before 1917 classified as White for Immigration purposes, but not considered White by the society at large.

The Naturalization Act of 1870, passed during Reconstruction, allowed for peoples of African descent to become U.S. Citizens, but it excluded other nonwhites. The U.S. Supreme Court in the case United States v. Wong Kim Ark, 169 U.S. 649 (1898) declared that all nonwhites who were born in the United States were eligible for citizenship via the Citizenship Clause of the 14th Amendment.

U.S. Immigration Policy was first restricted toward Chinese with the Chinese Exclusion Act of 1882, the Gentleman's Agreement of 1907 in which Japan voluntarily barred emigration to the United States and the Immigration Act of 1917 or the Asiatic Barred Zone, which barred immigrants from all of the Middle East, the Steppes and the Orient, excluding the Philippines which was then a US Colony. European Jews and Romani, although of Asiatic Ancestry, were not affected by the Asiatic Barred Zone, as they held European Citizenship.

The Johnson-Reed act of 1924 applied only to the Eastern Hemisphere. The Act imposed immigration quotas on Europe, which allowed for easy immigration from Northern and Western Europe, but almost excluded the Southern and Eastern European Nations. Africa and Asia were excluded altogether. The Western Hemisphere remained unrestricted to immigrate to the United States. Thus under the Immigration Act of 1924, all Hispanics and Caribbeans could immigrate to the United States, but a White family from Poland or Russia could not immigrate.

Puerto Rican Citizenship was created under the Foraker Act. In 1917, that Puerto Ricans were granted full American Citizenship under the Jones–Shafroth Act. Puerto Ricans, excluding those of obvious African ancestry, were like most Hispanics formally classified as White under U.S. Law.

==== Censuses ====
The first census by the United States in 1899 reported a population of 953,243 inhabitants, 61.8% of them classified as white, 31.9% as mixed, and 6.3% as black.

In the 1920 Puerto Rico census, 2,505 individuals immigrated to Puerto Rico between 1910 and 1920. Of these, 2,270 were classified as "white" in the 1920 census, with 1,205 from Spain, 280 from Venezuela, 180 from Cuba, and 135 from the Dominican Republic. During the same 10-year period, 7,873 Puerto Ricans emigrated to the U.S. Of these, 6,561 were listed as "white" on the U.S mainland census, 909 as "Spanish white" and 403 as "black".

Until 1950, the U.S. Bureau of the Census attempted to quantify the racial composition of the island's population, while experimenting with various racial taxonomies. In 1960 the census dropped the racial identification question for Puerto Rico, but included it again in the year 2000. The only category that remained constant over time was white, even as other racial labels shifted greatly—from "colored" to "Black", "mulatto" and "other". Regardless of the precise terminology, the census reported that the majority of the Puerto Rican population was white from 1899 to 2000.

In the 2015 Race and Hispanic Origin estimate (2011–2015 American Community Survey) published by the US Census Bureau, the data for Puerto Rico was as follows:

- White alone 2,495,997
- Black or African American alone 301,519
- American Indian and Alaska Native alone 11,775
- Asian alone 10,159
- Native Hawaiian and Other Pacific Islander alone 129
- Some Other Race alone 431,443
- Two or More Races 332,051
- Hispanic or Latino (of any race) 3,547,288
- White alone, Not Hispanic or Latino 24,900

In 2020, the Census Bureau reported the following data:

- White alone 560,592
- Black or African American alone 228,711
- American Indian and Alaska Native alone 17,870
- Asian alone 4,001
- Native Hawaiian and Other Pacific Islander alone 593
- Some Other Race alone 838,316
- Two or More Races 1,635,791
- Hispanic or Latino (of any race) 3,249,043
- White alone, Not Hispanic or Latino 24,548

In the 2020 census, the percentage of the population identifying as white dropped to 17.1%, down from 75.8% in the 2010 census. A similar drop in identification as white was seen among Hispanics in the 50 states and Washington, D.C., where the percentage of Hispanics identifying as white dropped from 53.0% to 20.3%. The change has been attributed to the wording of the Spanish-language version of the census questionnaire.

=== Genetic studies ===
Racial distribution – 2020 Census
Race	Population	% of Total
Total	3,285,874	100%
One race	811,610	24.7%
:White	560,592	17.1%
:Black/African American	230,011	7.0%
:American Indian and Alaska Native	16,429	0.5%
:Asian	3,285	0.1%
:Native Hawaiian/Pacific Islander	1,093	0.0%
:Some other race	837,897	25.5%
Two or more races	1,636,365	49.8%

In 2007, Puerto Ricans, on average, had genetic contributions from Europeans, West Africans, and Native Americans of approximately 66%, 18%, and 16%, respectively. A 2002 study of mitochondrial DNA (mtDNA) from 800 individuals found that patrilineal input, as indicated by the Y-chromosome, showed 66% of Puerto Ricans could trace their ancestry to male European ancestors, 18% could trace it to male African ancestors, and 16% could trace it to male Native American ancestors.

=== Non-Hispanic population ===
In 2020, non-Hispanic residents of Puerto Rico made up 1.1% of the population, up from 1.0% in 2010. Their highest concentrations are in Culebra (10.8%), Vieques (8.0%), Rincón (5.1%), Dorado (3.4%), Luquillo (2.9%), San Juan (2.2%) Guaynabo (2.1%) and Humacao (2.0%).

=== Women in the diaspora ===
In a 2004 study done on Puerto Rican women of all races, born on the island but living in New York by Carolina Bonilla, Mark D. Shriver and Esteban Parra, the ancestry proportions corresponding to the three parental populations were found to be 53.3±2.8% European, 29.1±2.3% West African, and 17.6±2.4% Native American based on autosomal ancestry informative markers. Although autosomal markers tests seem to draw a more broad picture than that of single, gender-based mtDNA and Y-Chromosome tests, the problem with autosomal DNA is in the archaic categories used: "European", "Sub-Saharan African", "East Asian" & "Native American". "Asian" (South, North or East) & "North African" are not included.

These generalized categories may not take into account the complexity of migratory patterns across the Old World. The study also found that, from the women sampled, 98% had European ancestry markers, 87% had African ancestry markers, 84% had Native American ancestry markers, 5% showed only African and European markers, 4% showed mostly Native American and European markers, 2% showed only African markers, and 2% showed mostly European markers.

== Religion ==
Christianity was the majority religion in 2010.

Religious breakdown in Puerto Rico (2010):

Pew Research Center (2010)
1. Catholic (69.7%)
2. Protestant (25.1%)
3. Other Christian (1.90%)
4. Other (1.40%)
5. Irreligious (1.90%)

=== Christians ===
A recent report providing a full breakdown as to specific religions is not available; the most recent was for 2006.

The Christian Denominational Breakdown was as follows in 2006:

Denomination	Adherents
Catholic	1,650,000
Other Pentecostal	229,814
Pentecostal Church of God	100,000
Assemblies of God	56,000
Baptist Convention	35,000
Seventh-day Adventist	31,524
Jehovah's Witnesses	25,778
Church of God (Cleveland)	17,500
Defenders of the Faith	17,500
The Church of Jesus Christ of Latter-day Saints	16,084
Disciples of Christ	10,778
United Methodist	10,000
Boriquen Presby Synod	8,300
Christian and Missionary Alliance	6,500
Church of the Nazarene	2,994
Other	130,400

==== Catholics ====
The Catholic Church has been historically the most dominant religion of the majority of Puerto Ricans, with Puerto Rico having the first dioceses in the Americas. This religion was brought by Spanish colonists. The first dioceses in the Americas, including that of Puerto Rico, were authorized by Pope Julius II in 1511. One Pope, John Paul II, visited Puerto Rico in October 1984. All municipalities in Puerto Rico have at least one Catholic Church, most of which are located at the town center or "plaza".

An Associated Press article in March 2014 stated that "more than 70 percent of whom identify themselves as Catholic" but provided no source for this information. It may have been using the 2010 Pew Research Center data.

The 2015 CIA World Factbook reports that 85% of the population of Puerto Rico identifies as Roman Catholic, while 15% identify as Protestant and Other. Neither a date or a source for that information is provided and may not be recent.

In November 2014, a Pew Research report, with the sub-title Widespread Change in a Historically Catholic Region, indicated that only 56% of Puerto Ricans were Catholic and that 33% were Protestant. This survey was completed between October 2013 and February 2014.

==== Protestants ====
Protestantism in Puerto Rico was suppressed under Spanish rule. Prior to the Spanish–American War there was only one Protestant church on the island, the Holy Trinity Anglican Church, which was established in 1872 and served the British expatriate community in Ponce. The church was forbidden from ringing its bell, using its front door, or holding services in Spanish until 1898, when American troops landed in Ponce and established freedom of worship. This was the first non-Catholic church in the Spanish Empire in the Americas.

Protestantism grew under American sovereignty due to the work of American missionaries, making contemporary Puerto Rico more interconfessional than in previous centuries, although Catholicism continues to be the dominant religion.

=== Muslims ===
In 2007, there were over 5,000 Muslims in Puerto Rico, representing about 0.13% of the population. There are eight Islamic mosques spread throughout the island, with most Muslims living in Río Piedras. Puerto Rican converts to Islam continue to occur. "Ties between Latinos and Islam are more than just spiritual, but date back to Spanish history. Many people do not realize that Muslims conquered Spain".

At times not just individuals, but whole families convert. A lack of Muslim education in the Island forces some Puerto Rican Muslims to migrate to the States. Islam was brought into Puerto Rico mainly via the Palestinian migration of the 1950s and '60s. Today there is a strong Palestinian presence among Muslims in Puerto Rico. "They are economically strong and are thus able to pay for a full-time Imaam".

=== Jews ===
Puerto Rico is also home to the largest Jewish community in the Caribbean, with 3,000 Jewish inhabitants. Some Puerto Ricans have converted, not only as individuals but as entire families. Puerto Rico is the only Caribbean island in which the Conservative, Reform and Orthodox Jewish movements are represented.

=== Other religious practices ===
Taíno religious practices have been rediscovered/reinvented by a handful of advocates. According to some sources, starting in about 1840, there have been attempts to create a quasi-indigenous Taíno identity in rural areas of Puerto Rico. This trend accelerated among the Puerto Rican community in the mainland United States in the 1960s. In the 2010 U.S. census, 9,399 people are identified as "Taíno."

African religious practices have been present since the arrival of enslaved Africans. In particular, the Yoruba beliefs of Santería and/or Ifá, and the Kongo-derived Palo Mayombe, sometimes called an African belief system, but rather a way of Bantu lifestyle of Congo origin, find adherence among the few individuals who practice some form of African traditional religion.

== Languages ==
- Spanish (main language)
- English

== See also ==
- Puerto Rican people
- Stateside Puerto Ricans
- Puerto Rican citizenship and nationality
- Demographics of the United States
- Puerto Rican citizenship
- Outline of Puerto Rico
- Cultural diversity in Puerto Rico
  - Corsican immigration to Puerto Rico
  - French immigration to Puerto Rico
  - Crypto-Judaism
  - German immigration to Puerto Rico
  - Irish immigration to Puerto Rico
  - Royal Decree of Graces of 1815
- History of women in Puerto Rico
- Military history of Puerto Rico
- National Register of Historic Places listings in Puerto Rico
- Homelessness in Puerto Rico

== Bibliography ==
- "Population and Society in Puerto Rico from the Spanish Colonial Era to 1940: A Select Bibliography". Caribbean Studies. 35 (2). University of Puerto Rico: 155–169. 2007. ISSN 0008-6533. JSTOR 25613118.
- Pyle, Sam; Celestine, Adia; Ging, Angela; Christy, Brooke (April 21, 2016). "Puerto Rico: A Sociological Analysis of Disparities in Hispanic Identification". Florida State University Libraries. Florida State University.
