= Defenders of the Faith (disambiguation) =

Defenders of the Faith may refer to:

- A Christian denomination
- A music album
- A book
