= List of Finding Your Roots episodes =

Finding Your Roots with Henry Louis Gates, Jr. is a documentary television series hosted by Henry Louis Gates Jr. that premiered on March 25, 2012, on PBS. Twelve seasons have been broadcast. Its twelfth season premiered on January 6, 2026.

== Series overview ==
Season	Episodes	Originally released	
Season	Episodes	First released	Last released
1	10	March 25, 2012	May 20, 2012
2	10	September 23, 2014	November 25, 2014
3	10	January 5, 2016	March 8, 2016
4	10	October 3, 2017	December 19, 2017
5	10	January 8, 2019	April 9, 2019
6	16	October 8, 2019	February 25, 2020
7	10	October 13, 2020	May 4, 2021
8	10	January 4, 2022	April 19, 2022
9	10	January 3, 2023	April 4, 2023
10	10	January 2, 2024	April 9, 2024
11	10	January 7, 2025	April 8, 2025
12	10	January 6, 2026	April 14, 2026

== Episodes ==
=== Season 1 (2012) ===
No. overall	No. in season	Title	Original release date
1	1	"Harry Connick, Jr. and Branford Marsalis"	March 25, 2012
Branford Marsalis and Harry Connick Jr., fellow jazz musicians, grew up together in New Orleans.
2	2	"John Lewis and Cory Booker"	March 25, 2012
Georgia Congressman John Lewis and then Newark Mayor Cory Booker meet each other before they explore their family heritages.
3	3	"Barbara Walters and Geoffrey Canada"	April 1, 2012
Barbara Walters and Geoffrey Canada both discover their families' original surnames in the episode.
4	4	"Kyra Sedgwick and Kevin Bacon"	April 8, 2012
Married couple Kyra Sedgwick and Kevin Bacon discover that they share distant ancestry.
5	5	"Rick Warren, Angela Buchdahl and Yasir Qadhi"	April 15, 2012
All three guests, Rick Warren, Angela Warnick Buchdahl and Abu Ammaar Yasir Qadhi, are religious leaders in their respective faiths.
6	6	"Robert Downey Jr. and Maggie Gyllenhaal"	April 22, 2012
Robert Downey Jr. and Maggie Gyllenhaal both descend from European-American immigrants. Robert's father, Robert Downey Sr., acts as the episode's unofficial third guest, sitting with Professor Gates as he reads his son's book of life.
7	7	"Samuel L. Jackson, Condoleezza Rice and Ruth Simmons"	April 29, 2012
Samuel L. Jackson, Condoleezza Rice and Ruth Simmons trace their genealogical backgrounds into slavery and, with the help of DNA analysis, back to Africa.
8	8	"Martha Stewart, Margaret Cho and Sanjay Gupta"	May 6, 2012
Martha Stewart, Margaret Cho and Sanjay Gupta are all the offspring of first or second generation immigrants.
9	9	"John Legend and Wanda Sykes"	May 13, 2012
John Legend and Wanda Sykes explore their rich and extensive free negro heritages. Margarett Cooper also makes an appearance in this episode, appearing only a year before her death in 2013. In keeping with the theme of the episode, Cooper seeks help from Gates to answer long-held questions about her free heritage.
10	10	"Michelle Rodriguez, Adrian Grenier and Linda Chavez"	May 20, 2012
In this episode, Michelle Rodriguez, Adrian Grenier, and Linda Chavez explore their Hispanic roots.

=== Season 2 (2014) ===
No. overall	No. in season	Title	Original release date
11	1	"In Search of our Fathers"	September 23, 2014
Celebrity guests: Stephen King, Gloria Reuben and Courtney B. Vance
12	2	"Born Champions"	September 30, 2014
Celebrity guests: Derek Jeter, Billie Jean King and Rebecca Lobo
13	3	"Our American Storytellers"	October 7, 2014
Celebrity guests: Ken Burns, Anderson Cooper, and Anna Deavere Smith
14	4	"Roots of Freedom"	October 14, 2014
Celebrity guests: Ben Affleck, Khandi Alexander and Ben Jealous. This episode has been withdrawn from all forms of distribution by PBS (see Ben Affleck controversy).
15	5	"The Melting Pot"	October 21, 2014
Celebrity guests: Tom Colicchio, Aarón Sánchez and Ming Tsai
16	6	"We Come From People"	October 28, 2014
Celebrity guests: Angela Bassett, Valerie Jarrett, and Nas
17	7	"Our People, Our Traditions"	November 4, 2014
Celebrity guests: Alan Dershowitz, Carole King, and Tony Kushner
18	8	"The British Invasion"	November 11, 2014
Celebrity guests: Deepak Chopra, Sally Field, and Sting
19	9	"Ancient Roots"	November 18, 2014
Celebrity guests: Tina Fey, George Stephanopoulos, and David Sedaris
20	10	"Decoding Our Past Through DNA"	November 25, 2014
Celebrity guests: Jessica Alba and Governor Deval Patrick (also appearing are Anderson Cooper, Valerie Jarrett and more). Gates' relationship to Wilmore Mail is described.

=== Season 3 (2016) ===
No. overall	No. in season	Title	Original release date
21	1	"The Stories We Tell"	January 5, 2016
Celebrity guests: Donna Brazile, Kara Walker and Ty Burrell
22	2	"The Irish Factor"	January 12, 2016
Celebrity guests: Soledad O'Brien, Bill O’Reilly and Bill Maher
23	3	"In Search of Freedom"	January 19, 2016
Celebrity guests: Maya Rudolph, Shonda Rhimes and Keenen Ivory Wayans
24	4	"Tragedy + Time = Comedy"	January 26, 2016
Celebrity guests: Jimmy Kimmel, Norman Lear and Bill Hader
25	5	"Visionaries"	February 2, 2016
Celebrity guests: Richard Branson, Maya Lin and Frank Gehry
26	6	"War Stories"	February 9, 2016
Celebrity guests: Patricia Arquette, Julianne Moore and John McCain
27	7	"Family Reunions"	February 16, 2016
Celebrity guests: Sean Combs and LL Cool J
28	8	"The Pioneers"	February 23, 2016
Celebrity guests: Neil Patrick Harris, Gloria Steinem and Sandra Cisneros
29	9	"The Long Way Home"	March 1, 2016
Celebrity guests: Azar Nafisi, Lidia Bastianich and Julianna Margulies
30	10	"Maps of Stars"	March 8, 2016
Celebrity guests: Mia Farrow and Dustin Hoffman

=== Season 4 (2017) ===
Garrison Keillor was scheduled to appear in the season finale, "Funny Business". His segment was edited out of the episode after reports of inappropriate workplace behavior by him were made public.

No. overall	No. in season	Title	Original release date
31	1	"The Impression"	October 3, 2017
Comedy writer Larry David and Senator Bernie Sanders discover their Jewish-American heritage and find that they have more in common than they think. Celebrity guests: Larry David and Bernie Sanders
32	2	"Unfamiliar Kin"	October 10, 2017
Actor Christopher Walken discovers that he had relatives back in Germany who stayed when Adolf Hitler rose to power; singer Carly Simon discovers that she has ancestry that her grandmother kept hidden; and former Saturday Night Live cast member Fred Armisen finds out that his paternal grandfather was not all that he seemed. Celebrity guests: Christopher Walken, Carly Simon and Fred Armisen
33	3	"Puritans and Pioneers"	October 17, 2017
Celebrity guests: Ted Danson, Mary Steenburgen and William H. Macy
34	4	"The Vanguard"	October 24, 2017
Celebrity guests: Ta-Nehisi Coates, Ava DuVernay, and Janet Mock
35	5	"Immigrant Nation"	October 31, 2017
Celebrity guests: Scarlett Johansson, Paul Rudd, and John Turturro
36	6	"Black Like Me"	November 7, 2017
Celebrity guests: Bryant Gumbel, Tonya Lewis Lee, and Suzanne Malveaux
37	7	"Children of the Revolution"	November 14, 2017
Celebrity guests: Lupita Nyong'o, Carmelo Anthony and Ana Navarro
38	8	"Relatives We Never Knew We Had"	November 21, 2017
Celebrity guests: Téa Leoni and Gaby Hoffmann
39	9	"Southern Roots"	December 12, 2017
Celebrity guests: Questlove, Dr. Phil and Charlayne Hunter-Gault
40	10	"Funny Business"	December 19, 2017
Celebrity guests: Amy Schumer and Aziz Ansari (Note: Episode originally featured Garrison Keillor. His segment was replaced by Maya Rudolph's from season 3.)

=== Season 5 (2019) ===
The series was renewed for a fifth season which premiered on January 8, 2019.

No. overall	No. in season	Title	Original release date
41	1	"Grandparents and Other Strangers"	January 8, 2019
Former Saturday Night Live cast member (and star of Brooklyn Nine-Nine) Andy Samberg searches for his mother's long-lost parents; Game of Thrones author George R.R. Martin stumbles upon a family secret about the man he called "Grandpa Louis". Celebrity guests: Andy Samberg and George R. R. Martin
42	2	"Mystery Men"	January 15, 2019
Celebrity guests: Felicity Huffman and Michael K. Williams
43	3	"Reporting on the Reporters"	January 22, 2019
Celebrity guests: Christiane Amanpour, Ann Curry and Lisa Ling
44	4	"Dreaming of a New Land"	January 29, 2019
Celebrity guests: Marisa Tomei, Sheryl Sandberg and Kal Penn
45	5	"Freedom Tales"	February 5, 2019
Celebrity guests: S. Epatha Merkerson and Michael Strahan
46	6	"Roots in Politics"	February 12, 2019
Celebrity guests: Tulsi Gabbard, Marco Rubio and Paul Ryan
47	7	"No Laughing Matter"	February 19, 2019
Celebrity guests: Seth Meyers, Tig Notaro, and Sarah Silverman
48	8	"Hard Times"	February 26, 2019
Celebrity guests: Laura Linney, Michael Moore and Chloë Sevigny
49	9	"The Eye of the Beholder"	April 2, 2019
Celebrity guests: Alejandro González Iñárritu, Marina Abramović and Kehinde Wiley
50	10	"All in the Family"	April 9, 2019
Celebrity guests: Ty Burrell and Joe Madison

=== Season 6 (2019–2021) ===
On July 29, 2019, it was announced that the sixth season would premiere on October 8, 2019. The season, which spanned from October 2019 to January 2021, explored the ancestry stories of Jon Batiste, Sterling K. Brown, RuPaul, Jeff Goldblum, Terry Gross, Anjelica Huston, Gayle King, Justina Machado, Marc Maron, Melissa McCarthy, Queen Latifah, Jordan Peele, Nancy Pelosi, Zac Posen, Issa Rae, Isabella Rossellini, Amy Ryan, Eric Stonestreet, Diane von Fürstenberg, Sigourney Weaver, Jeffrey Wright and Sasheer Zamata.

No. overall	No. in season	Title	Original release date
51	1	"Hollywood Royalty"	October 8, 2019
Celebrity guests: Anjelica Huston, Mia Farrow and Isabella Rossellini (the segments with Mia Farrow originally aired in season 3)
52	2	"Off The Farm"	October 15, 2019
Celebrity guests: Melissa McCarthy and Eric Stonestreet
53	3	"Homecomings"	January 7, 2020
Celebrity guests: Sterling K. Brown, Sasheer Zamata and Jon Batiste
54	4	"This Land is My Land"	January 14, 2020
Celebrity guests: Queen Latifah and Jeffrey Wright
55	5	"Beyond The Pale"	January 21, 2020
Celebrity guests: Jeff Goldblum, Terry Gross and Marc Maron
56	6	"Secrets and Lies"	January 28, 2020
Celebrity guests: Sigourney Weaver, Justina Machado and Amy Ryan
57	7	"Science Pioneers"	February 4, 2020
Celebrity guests: Francis Collins, Shirley Ann Jackson and Harold E. Varmus
58	8	"Slave Trade"	February 11, 2020
Celebrity guests: Ava DuVernay, S. Epatha Merkerson and Questlove (these profiles originally aired in seasons 4 and 5)
59	9	"Italian Roots"	February 18, 2020
Celebrity guests: Jimmy Kimmel, Marisa Tomei and John Turturro (these profiles originally aired in seasons 3, 4 and 5)
60	10	"Criminal Kind"	February 25, 2020
Celebrity guests: Laura Linney, Lisa Ling and Soledad O'Brien (these profiles originally aired in seasons 3 and 5)
61	11	"Fashion's Roots"	October 13, 2020
Celebrity guests: Diane von Fürstenberg, Narciso Rodriguez and RuPaul
62	12	"DNA Mysteries"	October 20, 2020
Celebrity guests: Téa Leoni and Joe Madison (these profiles originally aired in seasons 4 and 5)
63	13	"War Stories"	November 10, 2020
Celebrity guests: Kehinde Wiley, Julianne Moore and Bill Hader (these profiles originally aired in seasons 3 and 5)
64	14	"Flight"	November 17, 2020
Celebrity guests: Lupita Nyong'o, Lidia Bastianich and Scarlett Johansson (these profiles originally aired in seasons 3 and 4)
65	15	"Breaking Silences"	January 5, 2021
Celebrity guests: Gayle King, Jordan Peele and Issa Rae
66	16	"Coming to America"	January 12, 2021
Celebrity guests: Nancy Pelosi, Norah O'Donnell and Zac Posen

=== Season 7 (2021) ===
No. overall	No. in season	Title	Original release date
67	1	"To the Manor Born"	January 19, 2021
Celebrity guests: Glenn Close and John Waters
68	2	"Against All Odds"	January 26, 2021
Celebrity guests: Andy Cohen and Nina Totenberg
69	3	"No Irish Need Apply"	February 2, 2021
Celebrity guests: Jim Gaffigan and Jane Lynch
70	4	"The Shirts on their Backs"	February 9, 2021
Celebrity guests: Tony Shalhoub and Christopher Meloni
71	5	"Write My Name in the Book of Life"	February 16, 2021
Celebrity guests: Kasi Lemmons and Pharrell Williams
72	6	"Country Roots"	February 23, 2021
Celebrity guests: Clint Black and Rosanne Cash
73	7	"The New World"	April 13, 2021
Celebrity guests: John Lithgow and Maria Hinojosa
74	8	"Anchored to the Past"	April 20, 2021
Celebrity guests: Gretchen Carlson and Don Lemon
75	9	"On Broadway"	April 27, 2021
Celebrity guests: Audra McDonald and Mandy Patinkin
76	10	"Laughing on the Inside"	May 4, 2021
Celebrity guests: Lewis Black and Roy Wood Jr.

=== Season 8 (2022) ===
No. overall	No. in season	Title	Original release date
77	1	"Hidden in the Genes"	January 4, 2022
Celebrity guests: Rebecca Hall and Lee Daniels
78	2	"Activist Roots"	January 11, 2022
Celebrity guests: Brittany Packnett Cunningham and Anita Hill
79	3	"Children of Exile"	January 4, 2022
Celebrity guests: David Chang and Raúl Esparza
80	4	"Things We Don't Discuss"	January 25, 2022
Celebrity guests: Pamela Adlon and Kathryn Hahn
81	5	"Mexican Roots"	February 1, 2022
Celebrity guests: Melissa Villaseñor and Mario Lopez
82	6	"Fighters"	February 8, 2022
Celebrity guests: Terry Crews and Tony Danza
83	7	"Incredible Journeys"	February 15, 2022
Celebrity guests: Lena Waithe and John Leguizamo
84	8	"Songs of the Past"	February 22, 2022
Celebrity guests: Leslie Odom Jr. and Nathan Lane
85	9	"Watchmen"	April 12, 2022
Celebrity guests: Regina King and Damon Lindelof
86	10	"Where Did We Come From?"	April 19, 2022
Celebrity guests: Amy Carlson, André Leon Talley and Erin Burnett

=== Season 9 (2023) ===
No. overall	No. in season	Title	Original release date
87	1	"Hidden Kin"	January 3, 2023
Celebrity guests: Edward Norton and Julia Roberts
88	2	"Salem's Lot"	January 10, 2023
Celebrity guests: Claire Danes and Jeff Daniels
89	3	"Secret Lives"	January 17, 2023
Celebrity guests: Carol Burnett and Niecy Nash
90	4	"Far From Home"	January 24, 2023
Celebrity guests: Jamie Chung, Cyndi Lauper and Danny Trejo
91	5	"Rising from the Ashes"	January 31, 2023
Celebrity guests: Brian Cox and Viola Davis
92	6	"Lost and Found"	February 7, 2023
Celebrity guests: Tony Gonzalez and Joe Manganiello
93	7	"Chosen"	February 14, 2023
Celebrity guests: David Duchovny and Richard Kind
94	8	"And Still I Rise"	February 21, 2023
Celebrity guests: Angela Davis and Jeh Johnson
95	9	"Anchormen"	March 28, 2023
Celebrity guests: Jim Acosta and Van Jones
96	10	"Out of the Past"	April 4, 2023
Celebrity guests: Billy Crudup and Tamera Mowry-Housley

=== Season 10 (2024) ===
No. overall	No. in season	Title	Original release date
97	1	"Born to Sing"	January 2, 2024
Celebrity guests: Ciara and Alanis Morissette
98	2	"Forever Young"	January 9, 2024
Celebrity guest: Valerie Bertinelli and Brendan Fraser
99	3	"Fathers and Sons"	January 16, 2024
Celebrity guests: Wes Studi and LeVar Burton
100	4	"Buried Secrets"	January 23, 2024
Celebrity guests: Sammy Hagar and Ed O'Neill
101	5	"Hold the Laughter"	January 30, 2024
Celebrity guests: Bob Odenkirk and Iliza Shlesinger
102	6	"Far and Away"	February 6, 2024
Celebrity guests: Sunny Hostin and Jesse Williams
103	7	"The Brick Wall Falls"	February 13, 2024
Celebrity guests: Danielle Brooks and Dionne Warwick
104	8	"Mean Streets"	February 20, 2024
Celebrity guests: Tracy Morgan and Anthony Ramos
105	9	"In the Blood"	April 2, 2024
Celebrity guests: Michael Douglas and Lena Dunham
106	10	"Viewers Like You"	April 9, 2024
After a nationwide search, Professor Gates solves deep mysteries for three everyday Americans.

=== Season 11 (2025) ===
No. overall	No. in season	Title	Original release date
107	1	"Larger Than Life"	January 7, 2025
Celebrity guests: Lea Salonga and Amanda Seyfried
108	2	"La Famiglia"	January 14, 2025
Celebrity guests: Joy Behar and Michael Imperioli
109	3	"Stranger Than Fiction"	January 21, 2025
Celebrity guests: Amy Tan and Rita Dove
110	4	"Dreamers One and All"	January 28, 2025
Celebrity guests: Sharon Stone and Chrissy Teigen
111	5	"Family Recipes"	February 4, 2025
Celebrity guests: José Andrés and Sean Sherman
112	6	"Latin Roots"	February 11, 2025
Celebrity guests: Rubén Blades and Natalie Morales
113	7	"The Ties That Bind"	February 18, 2025
Celebrity guests: Kristen Bell and Dax Shepard
114	8	"The Butterfly Effect"	February 25, 2025
Celebrity guests: Debra Messing and Melanie Lynskey
115	9	"Moving on Up"	April 1, 2025
Celebrity guests: Lonnie Bunch and Sheryl Lee Ralph
116	10	"Finding My Roots"	April 8, 2025
Celebrity guests: Laurence Fishburne and Henry Louis Gates Jr. (himself)

=== Season 12 (2026) ===
No. overall	No. in season	Title	Original release date
117	1	"American Dreams"	January 6, 2026
Celebrity guests: Darren Criss and America Ferrera
118	2	"Great Migrations"	January 13, 2026
Celebrity guests: Wiz Khalifa and Sanaa Lathan
119	3	"Caribbean Roots"	January 20, 2026
Celebrity guests: Liza Colón-Zayas and Delroy Lindo
120	4	"The Road We Took"	January 27, 2026
Celebrity guests: Lizzy Caplan and Hasan Minhaj
121	5	"Love & Basketball"	February 3, 2026
Celebrity guests: Brittney Griner and Chris Paul
122	6	"Westward Bound"	February 10, 2026
Celebrity guests: Sara Haines and Tracy Letts
123	7	"Family Harmonies"	February 17, 2026
Celebrity guests: Flea and Lizzo
124	8	"Artistic Roots"	February 24, 2026
Celebrity guests: Spike Lee and Kristin Chenoweth
125	9	"Song of the South"	April 7, 2026
Celebrity guests: Danielle Deadwyler and Rhiannon Giddens
126	10	"Rags to Riches"	April 14, 2026
Celebrity guests: Barry Diller and Kate Burton
