= African American Lives =

2006–2008 PBS television miniseries

- Title card from the first season
- Also known as: African American Lives with Henry Louis Gates Jr.
- Genre: Family history Genealogy; Documentary series
- Written by: Henry Louis Gates Jr.
- Directed by: Leslie D. Farrell; Leslie Asako Gladsjo; Graham Judd; Jesse Sweet; Jack Youngelson
- Presented by: Henry Louis Gates Jr.
- Composer: Michael Bacon
- Country of origin: United States
- Original language: English
- No. of series: 2
- No. of episodes: 9

Production
- Executive producers: Henry Louis Gates Jr. William R. Grant; Peter W. Kunhardt
- Producers: Leslie D. Farrell; Leslie Asako Gladsjo; Graham Judd; Jesse Sweet; Jack Youngelson
- Running time: 55 minutes (roughly)
- Production companies: Kunhardt Productions thirteen WNET; Inkwell Films

Original release
- Network: PBS
- Release: February 1, 2006 – February 13, 2008

African American Lives is an American television miniseries hosted by historian Henry Louis Gates Jr., focusing on African American genealogical research. The family histories of prominent people of African American descent are explored using traditional genealogic techniques as well as genetic analysis.

== African American Lives ==
The first installment of the series aired in February 2006. The series featured research into the ancestral lineages of eight prominent African American guests. By billing the guests were: music producer Quincy Jones, astronaut and physician Mae Jemison, comedian Chris Tucker, bishop T. D. Jakes, sociologist Sara Lawrence-Lightfoot, actress Whoopi Goldberg, physician Ben Carson and talk show host Oprah Winfrey. Writer, host and executive producer of the series, Henry Louis Gates, also features his ancestral heritage on the show. The miniseries featured interviews with the parents and family members of guests including Winfrey's father, Vernon Winfrey. Geneticists Rick Kittles and Mark D. Shriver also make appearances.

The miniseries' four episodes were broadcast over two nights in two parts. On February 1, the first two episodes were broadcast as "Listening to our Past; The Promise of Freedom". The following week, on February 8, the third and fourth episodes aired as, "Searching for Our Names; Beyond the Middle Passage". Re-runs of the series as individual episodes were broadcast following the joint premier both nights. The miniseries was sponsored by Coca-Cola and Procter & Gamble who both produced commercials honoring African American heritage for use in the series.

== African American Lives 2 ==
African American Lives 2 premiered in February 2008, again hosted by Gates. This second set of episodes traced the ancestry of performers Morgan Freeman, Tina Turner, Tom Joyner, Chris Rock, Don Cheadle, theologian Peter Gomes, athlete Jackie Joyner-Kersee, poet Maya Angelou, Bliss Broyard (the daughter of writer Anatole Broyard) and publisher Linda Johnson Rice (the daughter of publisher John H. Johnson).

In addition to these more publicly known guests, Kathleen Henderson, an administrator at the University of Dayton, was selected from more than 2,000 applicants to have her family history researched and to have DNA testing. The show continued the genealogical research into Gates's own ancestry. He learned, to his surprise, that it is at least 50% European, including at least one male ancestor who fought in the American Revolution. Gates was invited to give a speech when he was later inducted into the Sons of the American Revolution. The four episodes of this miniseries are "The Road Home", "A Way Out of No Way", "We Come From People" and "The Past Is Another Country".

== Episodes ==
=== Series overview ===
Season	Episodes	Originally aired	
Season	Episodes	First aired	Last aired
1	4	February 1, 2006	February 8, 2006
Special	1	January 24, 2007	
2	4	February 6, 2008	February 13, 2008

=== African American Lives (2006) ===
No. overall	No. in season	Title	Directed by	Edited by	Original release date
1	1	"Listening to our Past"	Jesse Sweet	Eric Davies; Michael Weingrad	February 1, 2006
Featured guests: Oprah Winfrey primary; T. D. Jakes primary; Chris Tucker primary; Quincy Jones additional; Whoopi Goldberg appearance only; Mae Jemison appearance only; Family interviews in the episode include Winfrey's father, Vernon Winfrey, at his barbershop and home near Cleveland Park in Nashville, Tennessee. Gates' family is interviewed in his father's home town. Seated during the interview are his father, Henry Louis Gates, Sr., aunt Helen Gates Stephens, and brother Paul Gates. Also featured in the series are Chris Tucker's family members. At a large family gathering in DeKalb County, Georgia his two sisters, three brothers, and mother, Mary Louise Bryant, are identified. Tucker's maternal grandfather, Rev. Theodore Arthur Bryant, is formally interviewed by Tucker himself during a quiet moment at the family gathering. The Reverend Bryant also takes the cameras on a visit to his childhood home, now overrun by brush, it was the first piece of land ever owned by his family. In Austin, Texas, bishop Jakes talks with his uncle Hoover Jakes about his grandfather's mysterious premature death surrounded by other unidentified family members. Quincy Jones also talks about his upbringing and family.
2	2	"The Promise of Freedom"	Leslie Asako Gladsjo	Joanna Kiernan; Geeta Grandbhir	February 1, 2006
Featured guests: Whoopi Goldberg primary; Ben Carson primary; Oprah Winfrey primary; Sara Lawrence-Lightfoot additional; Mae Jemison appearance only; T. D. Jakes appearance only; In this episode we find Gates looking for answers about the unknown father of his great-great grandmother's many children and in doing so finds unexpected answers. Gates' father and aunt make appearances, again, as well as Gate's cousin, John Gates, who helps him to find records at the Allegany County court house. During the end credits we see highlights of a Gates' family gathering. Meanwhile Goldberg learns of an attempt of her ancestors' to own land only a few years after gaining freedom. Ben Carson's mother, Sonya Copeland, with her brothers Eddie and John Copeland, sit down to look through old family photos and tell stories for the series. In his sit-down with Gates, Carson discovers a heart warming tale of reunion in his genealogical past. In keeping with the episode's theme of ancestors lives immediately after finding freedom, Oprah Winfrey discovers her family's long ties to education. Also featured in the episode is Sara Lawrence-Lightfoot, who learns more information about her grandfather's profession with the historic Utica Normal and Industrial Institute. Consulted professionals: Jane Ailes genealogist; Ira Berlin historian; Joel Buchanan archivist; Shirley Hopkins-Davis educator; James Horton historian; Rick Kittles geneticist; Joe Knetsch land historian; Susan O'Donovan historian; Jim Powell Jr. archivist; Leslie Rowland historian
3	3	"Searching for Our Names"	Leslie D. Farrell	Merril Stern; Kathryn Moore	February 8, 2006
4	4	"Beyond the Middle Passage"	Graham Judd	Kate Hirson; Stefan Knerrich	February 8, 2006

=== Oprah's Roots: An African American Lives Special (2007) ===
No. overall	No. in season	Title	Original release date
5	1	"Oprah's Roots"	January 24, 2007
A special episode consisting entirely of footage from Oprah Winfrey's original interview for African American Lives' first series.

=== African American Lives 2 (2008) ===
No. overall	No. in season	Title	Original release date
6	1	"The Road Home"	February 6, 2008
7	2	"A Way Out of No Way"	February 6, 2008
8	3	"We Come From People"	February 13, 2008
9	4	"The Past Is Another Country"	February 13, 2008

== Criticism ==
Due in part to a centuries-long history within the United States, historical experiences pre- and post-slavery, and migrations throughout North America, the majority of contemporary African Americans possess varying degrees of admixture with European ancestry.

Many historians and critics believe that a majority of African Americans also have some Native American ancestry but, according to the experts on this show, it may be much less frequent.

With the help of Mark D. Shriver, Henry Louis Gates Jr. put African-American ancestry in these terms:

- 58 percent of African Americans have at least 12.5 percent European ancestry (equivalent of one great-grandparent);
- 19.6 percent of African Americans have at least 25 percent European ancestry (equivalent of one grandparent);
- 1 percent of African Americans have at least 50 percent European ancestry (equivalent of one parent); and
- 5 percent of African Americans have at least 12.5 percent Native American ancestry (equivalent to one great-grandparent).

However, critics suggest that the program failed to fully acknowledge to the audience, or inform guests, that not all ancestry may show up in such tests. Full survey DNA testing cannot accurately determine an individual's full ancestry.

In more recent genetic testing research reported in 2015, scholars found that varied ancestries among African Americans related to different by region and sex of ancestors. These studies found that on average, African Americans have 73.2-82.1% West African, 16.7%-29% European, and 0.8–2% Native American genetic ancestry, with large variation among individuals.

The genetic tests done on direct paternal or maternal line evaluate only a few ancestors among many. Ancestral information markers (AIM) must also be done to form a more complete picture of a person's ancestry. For instance, MtDNA testing is only of direct maternal ancestors. AIM markers are not as clearly defined for all populations as suggested, and depend on data still being accumulated. Historic populations migrated, which also influences results. Particularly, geneticists note that genetic analysis is incomplete related to Native Americans, and new genetic markers for these populations may be identified.

== In other media ==
Gates has written an associated book, In Search of Our Roots: How 19 Extraordinary African Americans Reclaimed Their Past, which was published in early 2009.

== See also ==
- Faces of America
- Finding Your Roots
- Ancestors in the Attic
- Who Do You Think You Are?
- Genealogy Roadshow
