= Faces of America =

2010 American documentary TV series

- Also known as: Faces of America with Henry Louis Gates, Jr.
- Genre: Documentary
- Directed by: John Maggio
- Presented by: Henry Louis Gates Jr.
- Composer: Michael Bacon
- Country of origin: United States
- No. of series: 1
- No. of episodes: 4

Production
- Producers: Barak Goodman, Sue Williams, John Maggio, Henry Louis Gates Jr., William R. Grant, Peter Kunhardt, Dyllan Mcgee
- Running time: 55 minutes (roughly)
- Production company: Kunhardt McGee Productions

Original release
- Network: PBS
- Release: February 10 – March 3, 2010

Related
- African American Lives; Finding Your Roots

Faces of America is a four-part American television series hosted by Professor Henry Louis Gates Jr. The series originally aired February 10 to March 3, 2010 from 8–9 p.m. ET. In Australia, this program aired on SBS One each Sunday at 7:30pm from 9 -30 January 2011.

== About ==
It uses genealogical research and genetics to find the family history of 12 Americans: Elizabeth Alexander, Mario Batali, Stephen Colbert, Louise Erdrich, Malcolm Gladwell, Eva Longoria, Yo-Yo Ma, Mike Nichols, Queen Noor of Jordan, Dr. Mehmet Oz, Meryl Streep, and Kristi Yamaguchi.

In the series finale, Gates explored the emerging use of full genome sequencing to understand personal ancestry and health, by learning what might be inferred from his whole genome sequence, and that of his father, through in-depth analysis by a personal genomics company (Knome) and the Broad Institute.

In 2012, PBS aired Finding Your Roots, also examining questions of genealogy and genetics, hosted by Gates. This program became an ongoing series. As of 2022 it was still in production, and will present new episodes in early 2023.

== Episodes ==
No.	Title	Original release date
1	"Our American Stories"	February 10, 2010
This episode explores the ups and downs of immigration into America during the 20th century.
2	"Becoming American"	February 16, 2010
3	"Making America"	February 23, 2010
4	"Know Thyself"	March 2, 2010

== Reception ==
Dave Walker of New Orleans Times-Picayune wrote "Surprising, fascinating, ultimately uniting."

== See also ==
- Ancestors in the Attic
- African American Lives
- Finding Your Roots
- Who Do You Think You Are?
- Genealogy Roadshow
