= Katrina Voss =

American pop science presenter and writer

Katrina O. Voss is a science writer and former bilingual broadcast meteorologist for The Weather Channel Latin America and AccuWeather. She is a science and research writer at Penn State’s Eberly College of Science and has contributed to a number of scientific journals and magazines, including New Scientist, The Humanist, Free Inquiry and Bulletin of the American Meteorological Society. In 2006, in the wake of Hurricane Katrina, she wrote about the psychological effects of sharing a name with a hurricane, prompting discussion about the fact that the majority, if not all, of hurricanes had been named after women.

Voss holds an AMS Seal and questioned the organization's decision to replace the program with the Certified Broadcast Meteorologist Seal rather than leaning into the benefits of having broadcasters of wider educational backgrounds. In an August 2009 issue of the New Scientist, she advised people to "stop being precious" over their DNA. She and her husband, anthropologist and geneticist Mark D. Shriver, collaborated on a SciVee series called Reading Between the Genes. Voss holds a bachelor's degree in Spanish literature and geosciences and meteorology.
