= 1899 Puerto Rico census =

First US census in Puerto Rico

Tenth census of Puerto Rico
- 10 November 1899; 126 years ago
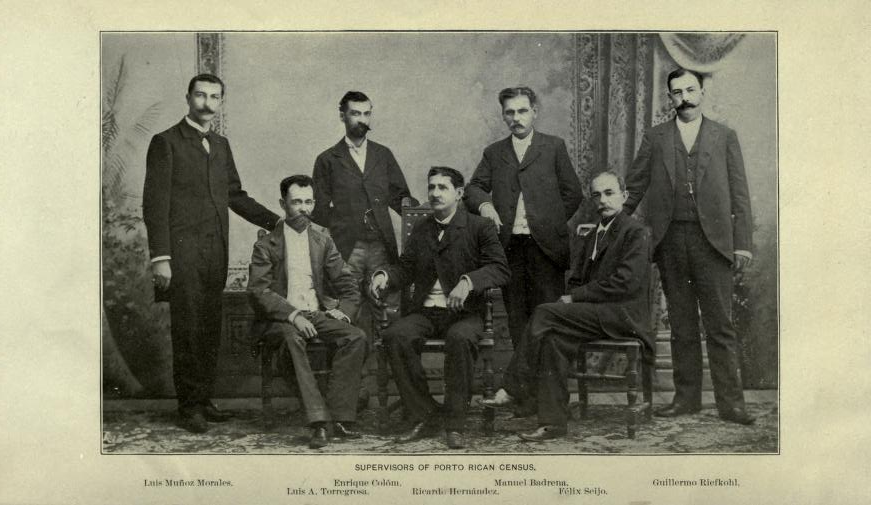
- Group of supervisors for the census.

General information
- Country: Puerto Rico
- Topics: Census topics: Situation; Relationship; Personal description; Nativity; Citizenship; Race; Occupation; Schooling, literacy; Sanitary
- Authority: Census Bureau for the U.S. War Department
- Website: census.gov

Results
- Total population: 953,243 (▲16.0%)
- Most populous department: Ponce (203,191)
- Least populous department: Aguadilla (99,645)

The 1899 Puerto Rico census (Porto Rico was also used) was a national population census held in Puerto Rico and first under U.S. control by the U.S. Census Bureau for the U.S. War Department. It was the tenth census combined with the nine previous censuses taken by Spain. The day used for the census was Friday November 10, 1899 with a total population counted as 953,243 - an increase of 154,678 or 16% over the previous 1887 census taken by the Spanish government.

== Population schedule ==
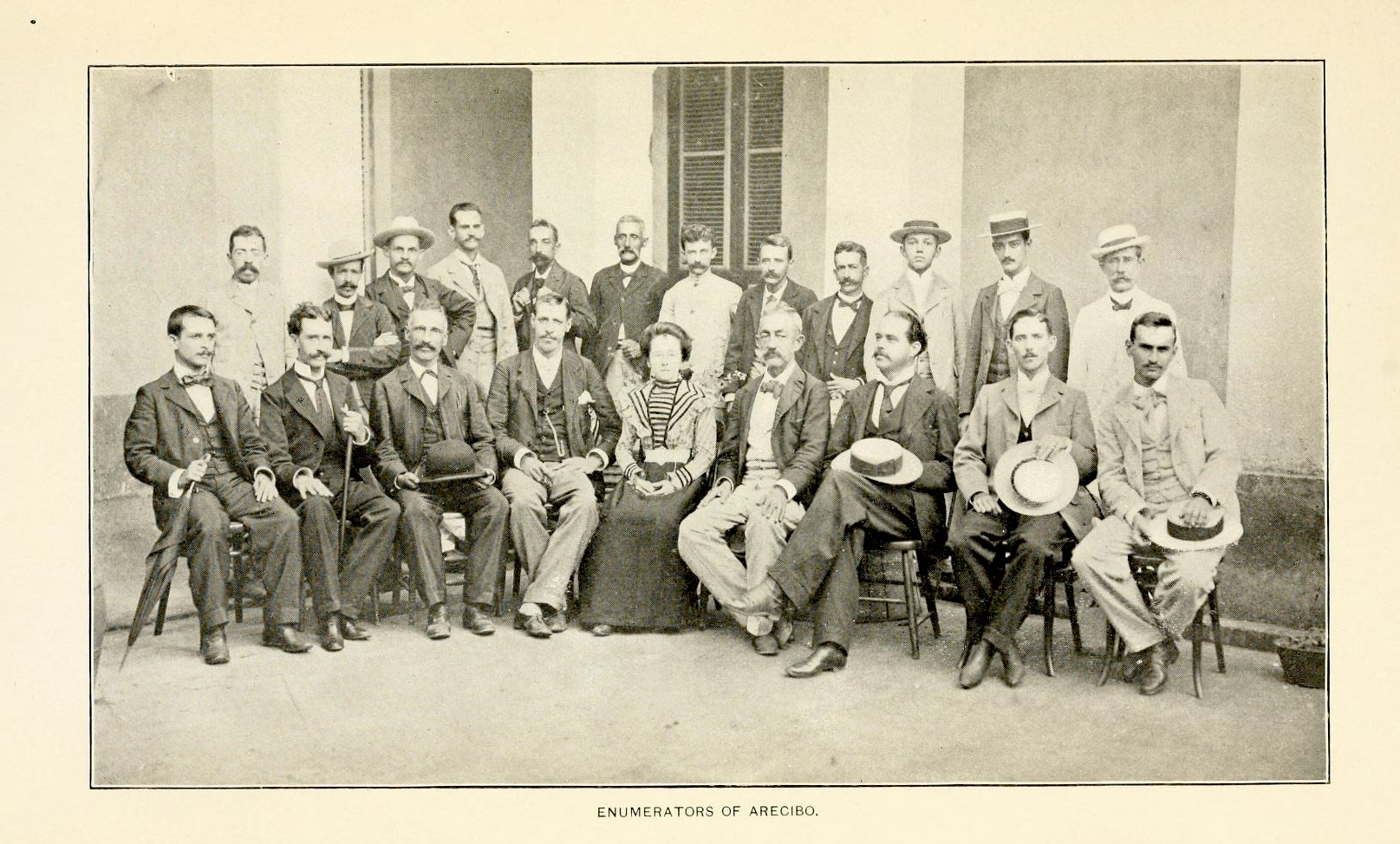
Enumerators of Arecibo.

The population schedule used in the census, translated into English and reduced in size is as follows:
Situation

- Street.
- Number of house.
- Number of house or building in the order of visitation.
- Number of family in the order of visitation.
- Name of every person residing with this family or in this house

Relationship

- Relationship of each person to the head of the family.

Personal description

- Color.
- Sex.
- Age at last birthday.
- Status.

Nativity

- Native country of this person.

Citizenship

- Cuban, Spaniard, or in suspense.

Occupation

- Occupation, trade or profession of every person 10 years of age and over.

Instruction

- Months of attendance at school during the last school year.
- Can read. (primary)
- Can write. (primary)
- Higher.

Sanitary conditions

- Source of water used.
- Disposition of garbage.
- Latrine system.

== Method of tabulation ==
It was taken that to save time, the tabulation should be done by machine and not by the old hand-tally system. As the machines invented by Mr Herman Hollerith were successfully used in the earlier eleventh and were to be used for the twelfth U.S. census, it was adopted.

== Population and dwellings ==
Department	Total population	Increase (%)
Humacao (with Río Grande)	100,866	8.2
Mayagüez	127,566	10.0
Guayama	111,986	15.5
Aguadilla	99,645	15.7
Bayamón (less Rio Grande)	147,681	20.2
Ponce	203,191	27.5
Arecibo	162,308	30.7
Puerto Rico	953,243	19.4 ▲

=== Population by municipal districts ===
Aguadilla department	99,645	Guayama department-continued	
Aguada	10,581	Cidra	7,552
Aguadilla	17,830	Comerío	8,249
Isabela	14,888	Guayama	12,749
Lares	20,883	Gurabo	8,700
Moca	12,410	Juncos	8,429
Rincón	6,641	Salinas	5,731
San Sebastian	16,412	San Lorenzo	13,433
Arecibo department	162,308	Humacao department	88,501
Arecibo	36,910	Fajardo	16,782
Barceloneta	9,357	Humacao	14,313
Camuy	10,887	Maunabo	6,221
Ciales	18,115	Naguabo	10,873
Hatillo	10,449	Patillas	11,163
Manati	13,989	Piedras	8,602
Morovis	11,309	Vieques	6,642
Quebradillas	7,432	Yabucoa	13,905
Utuado	43,860	Mayagüez department	127,566
Bayamon department	160,046	Añasco	13,311
Bayamon	19,940	Cabo Rojo	16,154
Carolina	11,965	Hormigueros	3,215
Corozal	11,508	Lajas	8,789
Dorado	3,804	Las Marias	11,279
Loiza	12,522	Maricao	8,312
Naranjito	8,101	Mayagüez	35,700
Rio Grande	12,365	Sabana Grande	10,560
Rio Piedras	13,760	San German	20,246
San Juan	32,048	Ponce department	203,191
Toa Alta	7,908	Adjuntas	19,484
Toa Baja	4,030	Aibonito	8,596
Trujillo Alto	5,683	Barranquitas	8,103
Vega Alta	6,107	Barros	14,845
Vega Baja	10,305	Coamo	15,144
Guayama department	111,986	Guayanilla	9,540
Aguas Buenas	7,977	Juana Diaz	27,896
Arroyo	4,867	Peñuelas	12,129
Caguas	19,857	Ponce	55,477
Cayey	14,442	Santa Isabel	4,858
-	-	Yauco	27,119

== Age ==
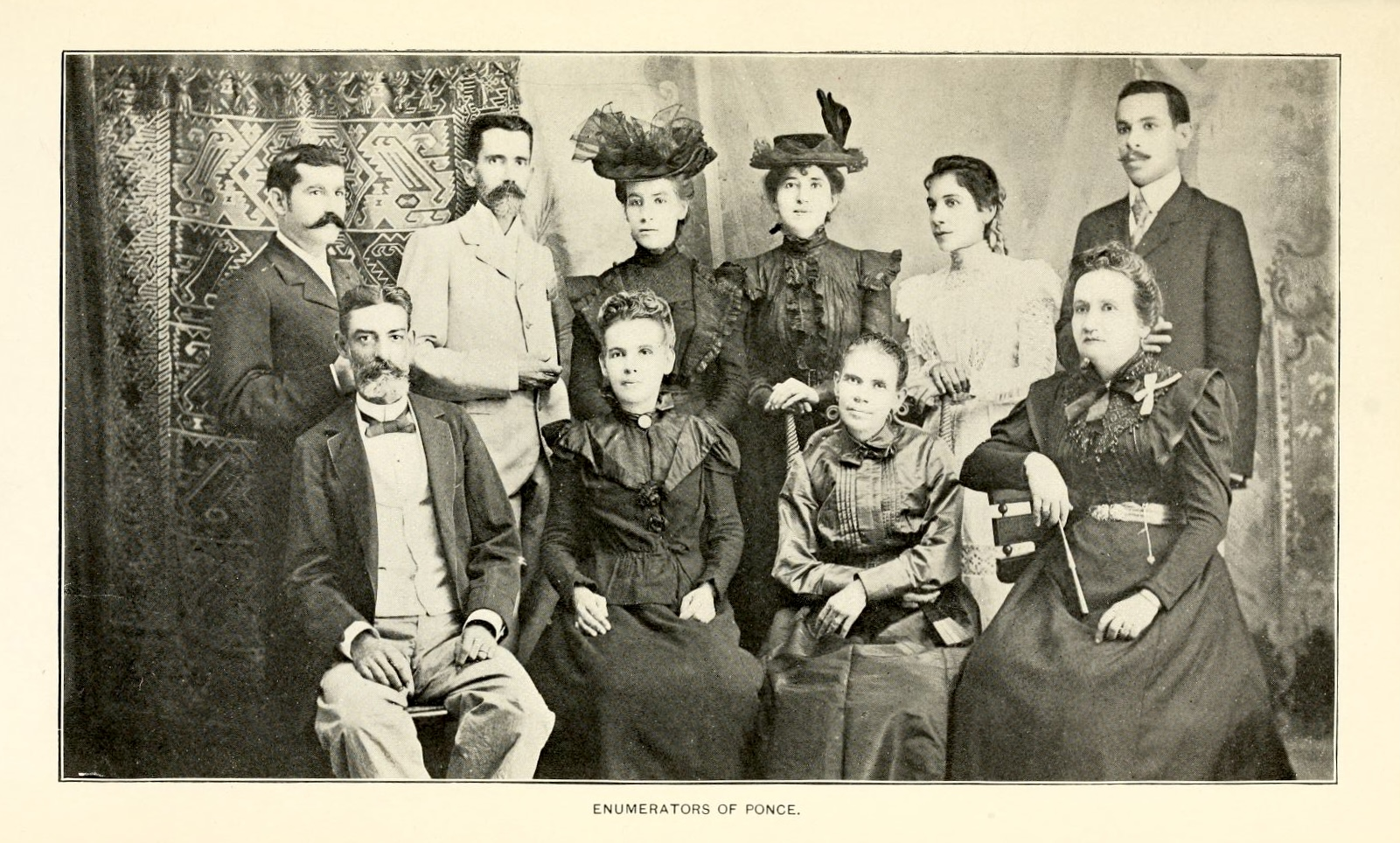
Puerto Rican enumerators of Ponce, the most populous department.

Data of the total population by median age.

Department	Median age
Guayama	17.3
Arecibo	17.6
Humacao	17.7
Aguadilla	17.9
Bayamon	18.2
Ponce	18.5
Mayaguez	19.1

== Nativity ==
=== Birthplace ===
% of foreign-born.
1. Spain (55.5%)
2. Spanish America (11.0%)
3. United States (7.50%)
4. Others (26.1%)

The number of foreign-born returned by the census is 13,872 or about 1.5% of the total population. There were few regions in the Western Hemisphere in which the proportion of natives is so high and that of the foreign-born so low. Of the total number of foreigners 5,935 or 43 per cent were found in the three cities of San Juan, Ponce and Mayagüez. Of the total foreign-born, 7,690 or 55% were born in Spain.

Birthplace	Number	%
Puerto Rico	939,371	98.5
Foreign-born	13,872	1.5
Europe	-	-
Spain	7,690	
Spanish America	1,542	0.2
West India islands	1,194	-
Africa	427	-
United States	1,069	0.1
China	68	-
Puerto Rico	953,243	100

=== Race ===
With reference to race, the population of Porto Rico is divided by the census into two main classes - those who are and those who are not White. The number belonging to each of these classes is as follows:

Race	Population	%
White	589,426	61.8
Colored*	363,817	38.2
(Persons of mixed blood)	304,352	83.6
Puerto Rico	953,243	100.0

The colored in the table includes very few (75) Chinese and many persons of mixed white and Black African blood as well as pure Black. Somewhat more than three-fifths of the population of Porto Rico are white and nearly two-fifths are partly or entirely African or Black. By the 1899 census five-sixths (83.6 per cent) of the total colored were returned as of mixed blood.

== Gallery ==
Supervisors and enumerators of different departments.

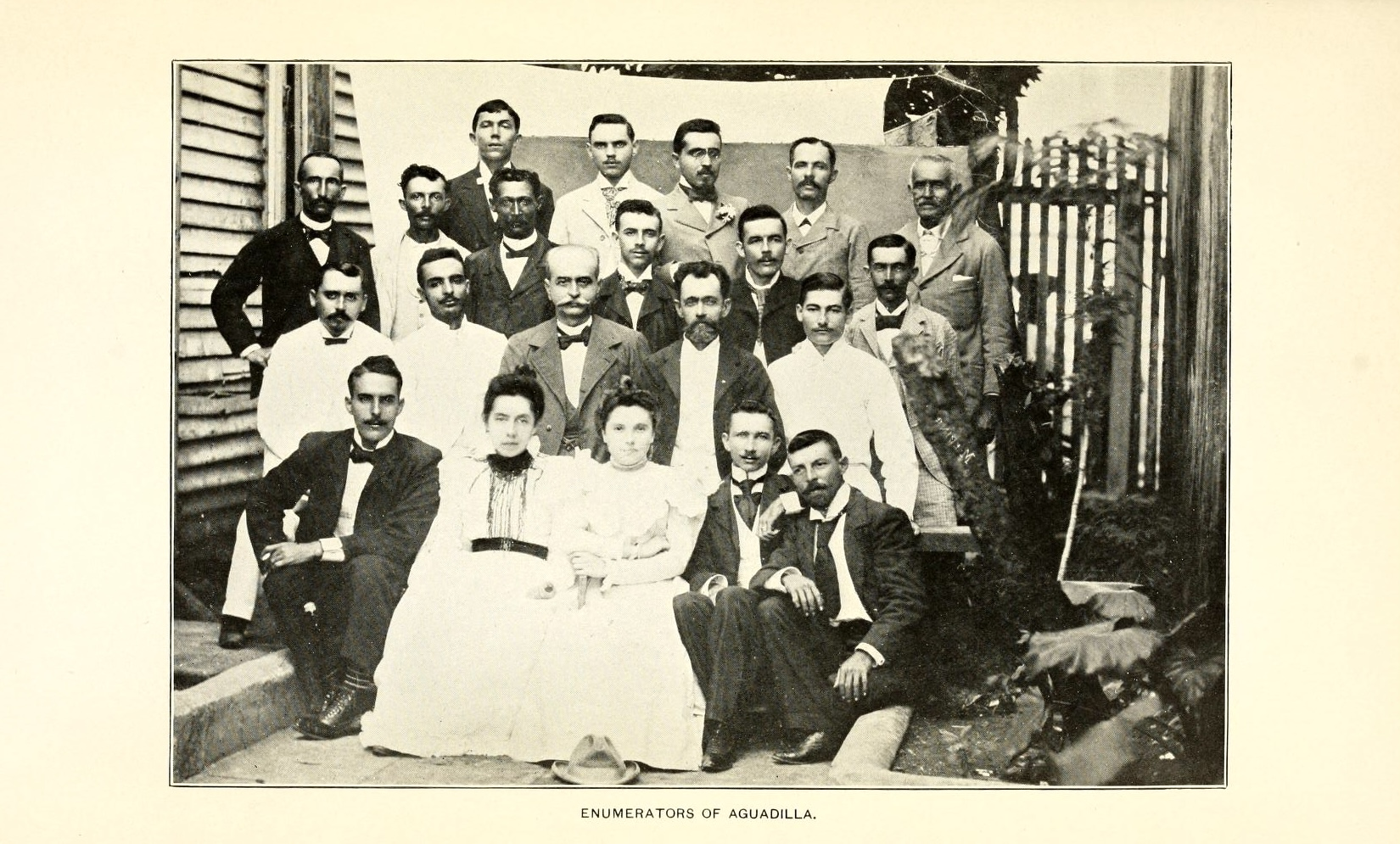
Aguadilla

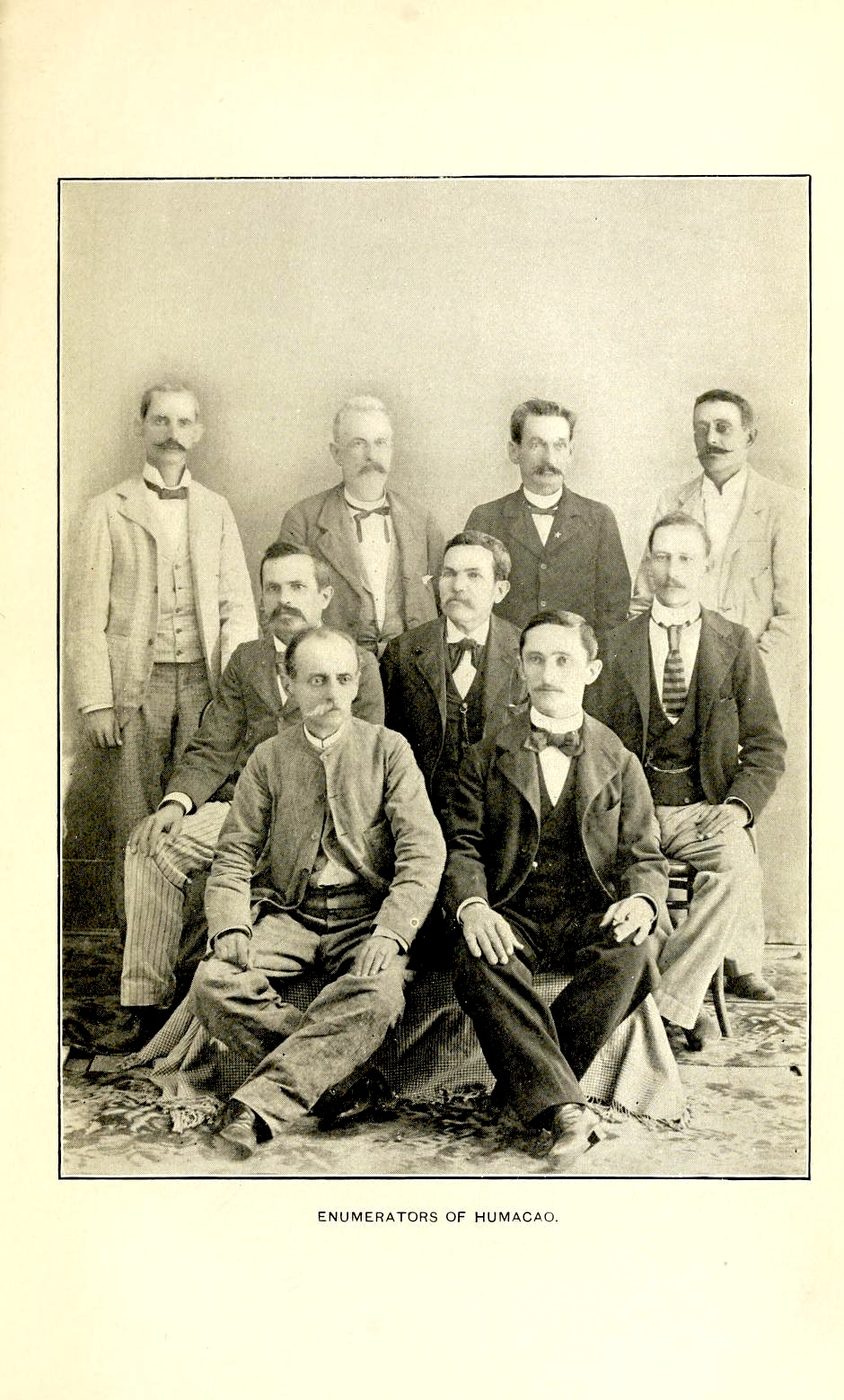
Humacao

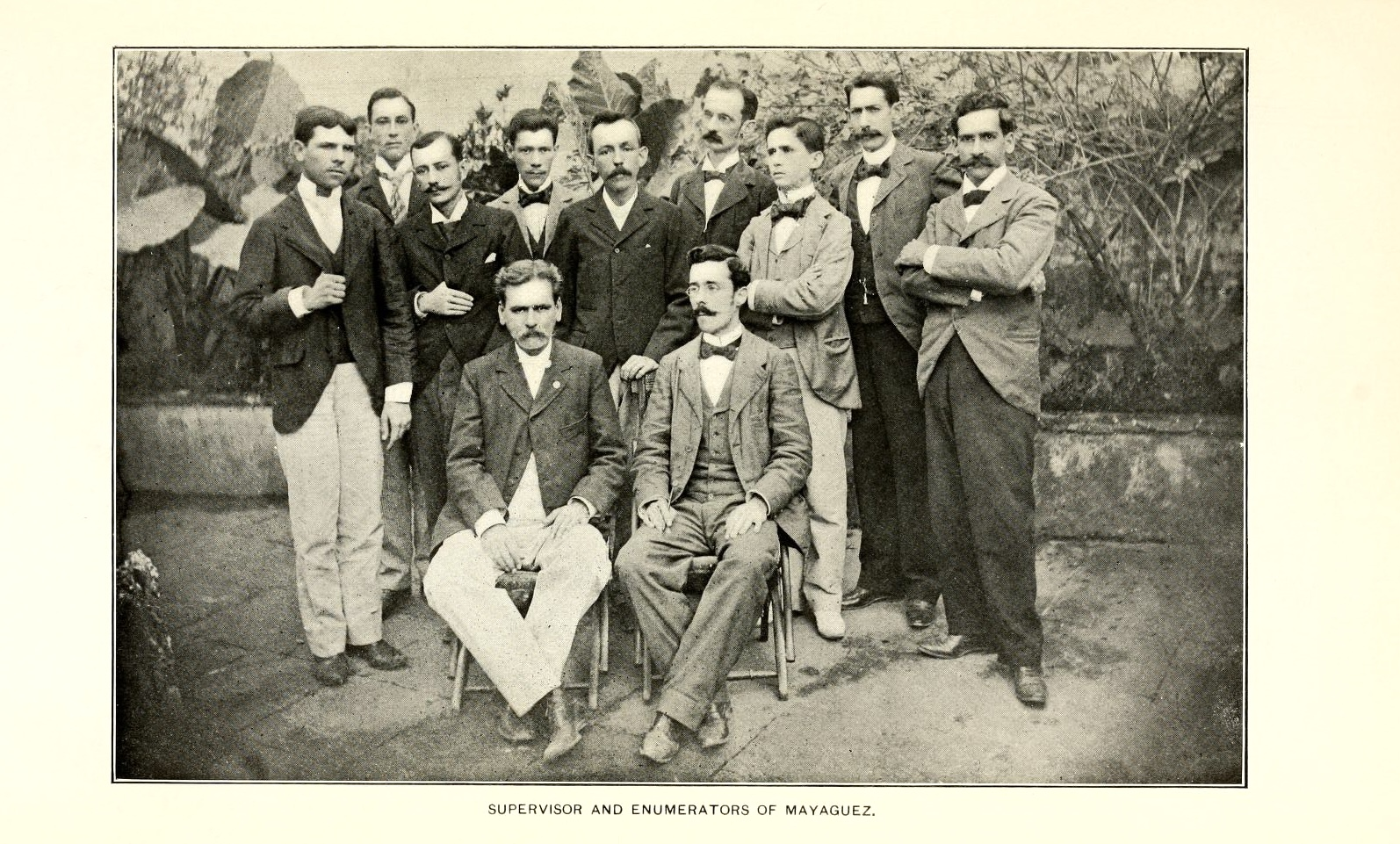
Mayaguez

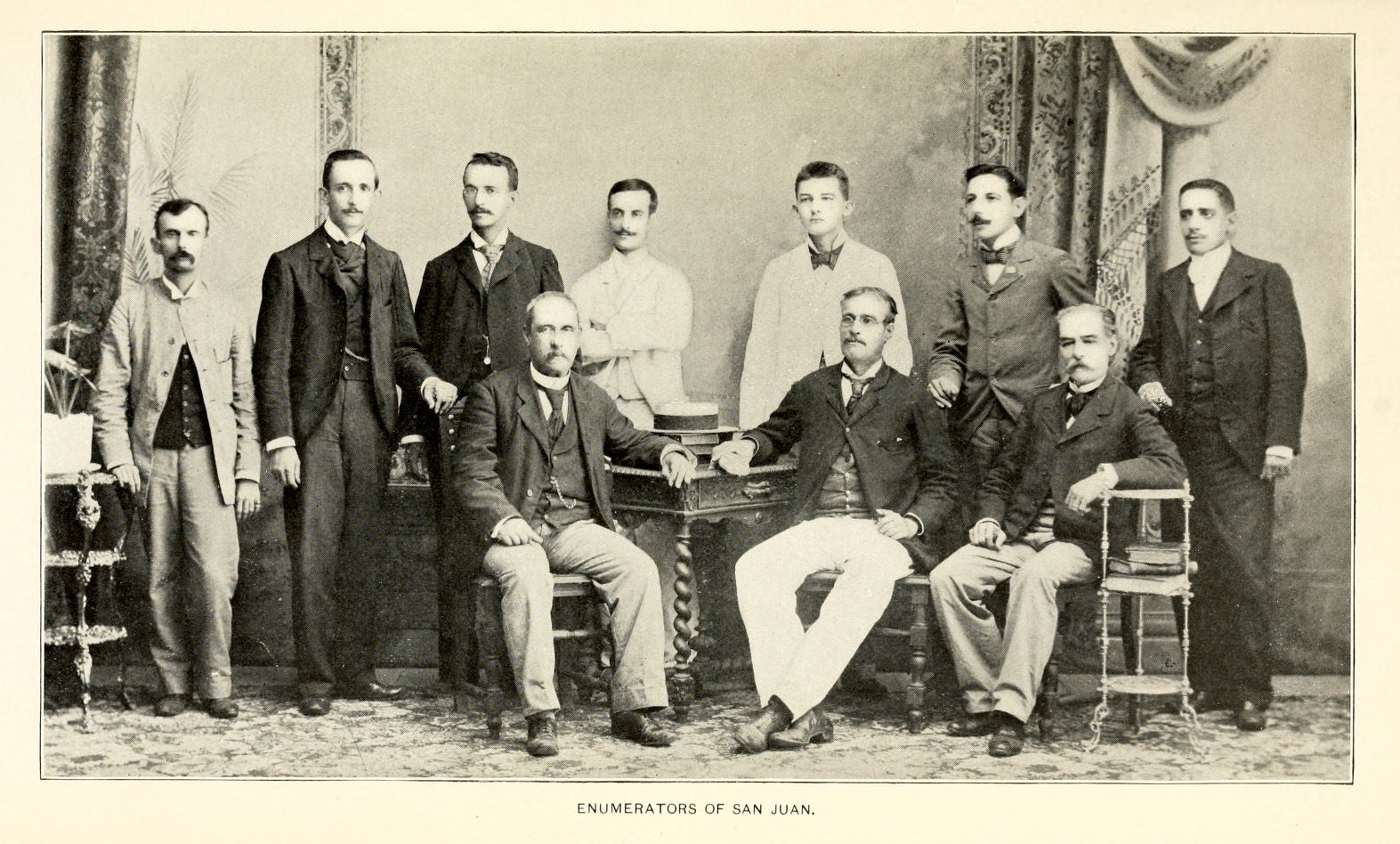
San Juan

Full report on the census (press to read)

== See also ==
- United States Census
- Puerto Rican citizenship
- Demographics of Puerto Rico
- 1890 United States census
- 1931 Cuba census
