= Who Do You Think You Are? (American TV series) =

American television series

- Genre: Documentary
- Based on: Who Do You Think You Are?
- Narrated by: Mocean Melvin
- Composer: Ah2
- Country of origin: United States
- Original language: English
- No. of seasons: 11
- No. of episodes: 84 (+ 1 special)

Production
- Executive producers: Alex Graham; Pam Healey; Lisa Kudrow; Dan Bucatinsky; Stephanie Schwam; Al Edgington
- Producers: Jim Albarano; Anna Pousho; Justin Robertson; Aleta Rozanski
- Running time: 42 minutes
- Production companies: Shed Media; Is or Isn't Entertainment

Original release
- Network: NBC (2010–12, 2022); TLC (2013–18)
- Release: March 5, 2010 – August 14, 2022

Who Do You Think You Are? is an American genealogy documentary series that is an adaptation of the British series of the same name that airs on the BBC. In each episode, a celebrity participant researches their family history. The participant often travels to locations both domestically and internationally to research family stories.

The series is a partnership between Shed Media and Ancestry.com, with executive producers including Alex Graham, Pam Healey, Lisa Kudrow, Dan Bucatinsky, Stephanie Schwam and Al Edgington.

== Production ==
In early 2009, it was announced that NBC had ordered an American adaptation of the British series Who Do You Think You Are?. It was reported that Lisa Kudrow was set to executive produce the series as well as participate in one of the first-season episodes. The show premiered on NBC on March 5, 2010, as one of the replacement shows for The Jay Leno Show at the ten o'clock hour.

NBC renewed the series for two subsequent seasons before cancelling it in 2012. The series was then picked up by TLC, where it aired for six additional seasons. On August 25, 2017, TLC renewed the series for a tenth season.

On May 6, 2019, it was announced that the series would return to NBC. The eleventh season premiered on July 10, 2022. On October 10, 2022, it was reported that NBC shelved the series indefinitely.

== Series overview ==
Season	Episodes	Originally released		
Season	Episodes	First released	Last released	Network
1	7	March 5, 2010	April 30, 2010	NBC
2	8	February 4, 2011	April 8, 2011	NBC
3	12	February 3, 2012	May 18, 2012	NBC
4	8	July 23, 2013	September 10, 2013	TLC
5	13	July 23, 2014	April 26, 2015	TLC
6	5	July 26, 2015	August 30, 2015	TLC
7	6	April 3, 2016	May 1, 2016	TLC
8	8	March 5, 2017	April 24, 2017	TLC
9	6	May 21, 2018	June 18, 2018	TLC
10	4	December 3, 2018	December 17, 2018	TLC
11	6	July 10, 2022	August 14, 2022	NBC

== Episodes ==
=== Season 1 (2010) ===
No. overall	No. in season	Featured celebrity	Locations visited	Original release date
1	1	"Sarah Jessica Parker"	Cincinnati, Ohio; El Dorado County, California; Boston, Massachusetts; Danvers, Massachusetts	March 5, 2010
2	2	"Emmitt Smith"	Pensacola, Florida; Burnt Corn, Alabama; Claiborne, Alabama; Boydton, Virginia; Ouidah, Benin	March 12, 2010
3	3	"Lisa Kudrow"	Minsk, Belarus, Ilya, Belarus; Gdynia, Poland	March 19, 2010
4	4	"Matthew Broderick"	Jersey City, New Jersey; New York City, New York; Forest of Argonne, France; Hartford, Connecticut; Atlanta, Georgia; Marietta National Cemetery, Cobb County, Georgia	March 26, 2010
5	5	"Brooke Shields"	Newark, New Jersey; New York City, New York; Rome, Italy; Augerolles, France; Paris, France	April 2, 2010
6	6	"Susan Sarandon"	Virginia; New York City, New York; Florence; Coreglia Antelminelli; Rockland County, New York	April 23, 2010
7	7	"Spike Lee"	Atlanta, Georgia; Twiggs County, Georgia; Arlington, Texas	April 30, 2010

=== Season 2 (2011) ===
NBC ordered a second season for the reality series on April 5, 2010. The second season of the series began on February 4, 2011, and consisted of eight episodes. The first episode featured Vanessa Williams. Following episodes featured Tim McGraw, Rosie O'Donnell, Kim Cattrall, Lionel Richie, Steve Buscemi, Gwyneth Paltrow and Ashley Judd. Cattrall's episode is an edited version of the original one that she made for the British series in 2009.

No. overall	No. in season	Featured celebrity	Locations visited	Original release date
8	1	"Vanessa L. Williams"	Chappaqua, New York; Oyster Bay, Long Island, New York; Washington, D.C.; Johns Island, South Carolina; Baltimore, Maryland; Memphis, Tennessee; Nashville, Tennessee	February 4, 2011
9	2	"Tim McGraw"	Kansas City, Missouri; Big Stone Gap, Virginia; Rye Cove, Virginia; Richmond, Virginia; Shenandoah Valley; Washington, D.C.; New York City, New York; Franklin, Tennessee	February 11, 2011
10	3	"Rosie O'Donnell"	Nyack, New York; Jersey City, New Jersey; New York City, New York (Manhattan and Brooklyn); Secaucus, New Jersey; Montreal, Quebec; Dublin, Ireland; County Wicklow, Ireland; Newbridge, County Kildare, Ireland; Birr, County Offaly, Ireland	February 18, 2011
11	4	"Kim Cattrall"	Liverpool, England; Derbyshire, England; Durham, County Durham, England; Tudhoe, County Durham, England; Vancouver, British Columbia, Canada	February 25, 2011
12	5	"Lionel Richie"	Los Angeles, California; Tuskegee, Alabama; Nashville, Tennessee; Chattanooga, Tennessee	March 4, 2011
13	6	"Steve Buscemi"	Brooklyn, New York; Harrisburg, Pennsylvania; Fredericksburg, Virginia; Camden, New Jersey	March 25, 2011
14	7	"Gwyneth Paltrow"	Manhattan, New York City, New York; Bridgetown, Barbados	April 1, 2011
15	8	"Ashley Judd"	Louisville, Kentucky; Frankfort, Kentucky; Saltville, Virginia; Boston, Massachusetts; York, England; Boston, Lincolnshire, England; Cambridge, England; Plymouth, Devon, England	April 8, 2011

=== Season 3 (2012) ===
The show was renewed for a third season by NBC on February 22, 2011, and aired during the 2011–2012 television season. The 12 celebrities included in season 3 were Marisa Tomei, Rob Lowe, Paula Deen, Rashida Jones, Jerome Bettis, Reba McEntire, Helen Hunt, Edie Falco, Rita Wilson, Jason Sudeikis, Martin Sheen and Blair Underwood. The show returned on February 3, 2012.

No. overall	No. in season	Featured celebrity	Locations visited	Original release date
16	1	"Martin Sheen"	Malibu, California; Dublin, Ireland; Madrid, Spain; Pamplona, Navarre, Spain; Tui, Galicia, Spain; La Coruña, Galicia, Spain; Parderrubias, Galicia, Spain	February 3, 2012
17	2	"Marisa Tomei"	Manhattan, New York City, New York; Livorno, Tuscany, Italy (Cecina, Rio nell'Elba, Portoferraio and Castiglioncello); Lucca, Tuscany, Italy	February 10, 2012
18	3	"Blair Underwood"	Los Angeles, California; Petersburg, Virginia; Richmond, Virginia; Lynchburg, Virginia; Babungo, Northwest Region, Cameroon	February 24, 2012
19	4	"Reba McEntire"	Stringtown, Oklahoma; Aberdeen, Mississippi; Raleigh, North Carolina; Oxford, North Carolina; Tappahannock, Virginia; Cheshire, England	March 2, 2012
20	5	"Jerome Bettis"	Detroit, Michigan; Paducah, Kentucky; Calloway County, Kentucky	March 9, 2012
21	6	"Helen Hunt"	Los Angeles, California; Pasadena, California; San Francisco, California; Portland, Maine	March 23, 2012
22	7	"Rita Wilson"	Los Angeles, California; Oraio, Greece; Smolyan, Bulgaria; Plovdiv, Bulgaria; Sofia, Bulgaria	March 30, 2012
23	8	"Edie Falco"	Long Island, New York; Milwaukee, Wisconsin; England (Fulham; Penzance)	April 6, 2012
24	9	"Rob Lowe"	Santa Barbara, California; Washington, D.C.; Trenton, New Jersey; Newtown, Pennsylvania; Germany (Marburg; Hessisch Lichtenau)	April 27, 2012
25	10	"Rashida Jones"	Los Angeles, California; New York City, New York; Dublin, Ireland; Latvia (Riga; Aizpute; Rumbula)	May 4, 2012
26	11	"Jason Sudeikis"	New York City, New York; Overland Park, Kansas; Chicago, Illinois; Bridgeport, Connecticut; Harrisburg, Pennsylvania	May 11, 2012
27	12	"Paula Deen"	Savannah, Georgia; Albany, Georgia; Morrow, Georgia; Athens, Georgia; Atlanta, Georgia; Leesburg, Georgia	May 18, 2012

=== Season 4 (2013) ===
After being cancelled by NBC, TLC picked up the series and the new season began on July 23, 2013. The celebrities taking part in the fourth season were Christina Applegate, Cindy Crawford, Zooey Deschanel, Chelsea Handler, Kelly Clarkson, Trisha Yearwood, Jim Parsons and Chris O'Donnell.

No. overall	No. in season	Featured celebrity	Locations visited	Original release date
28	1	"Kelly Clarkson"	Columbus, Ohio; Decatur, Georgia; Andersonville, Georgia; Marietta, Ohio; Coal Run, Ohio	July 23, 2013
29	2	"Christina Applegate"	Trenton, New Jersey	July 30, 2013
30	3	"Chelsea Handler"	Bochum, Germany; Herne, Germany; Berlin, Germany; Saint-Raphaël, France; Algona, Iowa	August 6, 2013
31	4	"Zooey Deschanel"	Philadelphia, Pennsylvania; Swarthmore, Pennsylvania; Lancaster, Pennsylvania; Christiana, Pennsylvania	August 13, 2013
32	5	"Chris O'Donnell"	St. Louis; Washington, D.C.; Annapolis, Maryland; Baltimore, Maryland	August 20, 2013
33	6	"Cindy Crawford"	Boston, Massachusetts; Hartford, Connecticut; Taunton, England; London, England; Aachen, Germany	August 27, 2013
34	7	"Trisha Yearwood"	Nashville, Tennessee; Hampshire, England; Kew, England; Atlanta, Georgia	September 3, 2013
35	8	"Jim Parsons"	New Orleans, Louisiana; Paris, France; Versailles, France	September 10, 2013

=== Season 5 (2014–15) ===
TLC renewed the show on September 10, 2013. The season premiered on July 23, 2014, and featured Cynthia Nixon, Jesse Tyler Ferguson, Rachel McAdams, Valerie Bertinelli and Kelsey Grammer. Initially, an episode featuring Lauren Graham was planned but cancelled. Just like Kim Cattrall's episode, the network chose to air an edited version of an episode that Minnie Driver had made for the original BBC series in 2013.

No. overall	No. in season	Featured celebrity	Locations visited	Original release date
Season
36	1	"Cynthia Nixon"	Manhattan, New York City, New York; Washington, D.C.; Jefferson City, Missouri; Leasburg, Missouri	July 23, 2014
37	2	"Jesse Tyler Ferguson"	Albuquerque, New Mexico; Annapolis, Maryland; Evanston, Illinois; Wrangell, Alaska	July 30, 2014
38	3	"Rachel McAdams (Note: The episode also featured McAdams' sister Kayleen McAdams, a Hollywood make-up artist.)"	Plymouth, Devon, England; Ottawa, Ontario, Canada; St-Jean-sur-Richelieu, Quebec, Canada; Toronto, Ontario, Canada	August 6, 2014
39	4	"Valerie Bertinelli"	Scranton, Pennsylvania; Lanzo, Torino, Italy; London, United Kingdom	August 13, 2014
40	5	"Kelsey Grammer"	Beverly Hills, California; San Francisco, California; Oakland, California; Portland, Oregon; Baker City, Oregon; Salem, Oregon; Benton County, Oregon	August 20, 2014
Special
–	–	"Minnie Driver"	Weybridge, England; Darlington, England	August 27, 2014
Season
41	6	"Julie Chen"	Los Angeles, California; Singapore; Penglai, Anxi County, Fujian, China	March 8, 2015
42	7	"Josh Groban"	Los Angeles, California; Stuttgart, Germany	March 15, 2015
43	8	"Angie Harmon"	Charlotte, North Carolina; Philadelphia, Pennsylvania; Valley Forge, Pennsylvania; Harrisburg, Pennsylvania; Harrodsburg, Kentucky	March 22, 2015
44	9	"Sean Hayes"	Los Angeles, California; Chicago, Illinois; Dublin, Ireland; Tarbert, Ireland	March 29, 2015
45	10	"Tony Goldwyn"	Los Angeles, California; Albany, New York; Nunda, New York; Portland, Oregon; The Dalles, Oregon; Salem, Oregon; Hood River, Oregon	April 5, 2015
46	11	"America Ferrera"	New York City, New York; La Esperanza, Intibucá, Honduras; Tegucigalpa, Honduras; San Jerónimo, Copán, Honduras	April 12, 2015
47	12	"Bill Paxton"	Los Angeles, California; Washington, D.C.; Blacksburg, South Carolina; Richmond, Virginia; Warren County, Missouri	April 19, 2015
48	13	"Melissa Etheridge"	Los Angeles, California; Quebec City, Quebec, Canada; Chester, Illinois; Kaskaskia, Illinois; Ste. Genevieve, Missouri	April 26, 2015

=== Season 6 (2015) ===
Season 6 premiered on July 26, 2015. This season featured Ginnifer Goodwin, J. K. Rowling, Alfre Woodard, Bryan Cranston and Tom Bergeron. Rowling's episode was an edited version of her appearance on the original BBC series in 2011.

No. overall	No. in season	Featured celebrity	Locations visited	Original release date
49	1	"Ginnifer Goodwin"	Los Angeles, California; Batesville, Arkansas; Little Rock, Arkansas; Shreveport, Louisiana	July 26, 2015
50	2	"J. K. Rowling"	Edinburgh, Scotland; Paris, France; Brumath, Alsace, France	August 2, 2015
51	3	"Alfre Woodard"	Los Angeles, California; Perry, Georgia; Baton Rouge, Louisiana; Jackson Parish, Louisiana	August 9, 2015
52	4	"Into the Archives"	Some of the biggest emotional and shocking highlights from past seasons.	August 16, 2015
53	5	"Bryan Cranston"	Los Angeles, California; Chicago, Illinois; Springfield, Illinois; Montreal, Quebec; Dayton, Ohio	August 23, 2015
54	6	"Tom Bergeron"	Portsmouth, New Hampshire; La Rochelle, France; Quebec City, Quebec	August 30, 2015

=== Season 7 (2016) ===
Season 7 premiered on April 3, 2016. The list of celebrity participants included Aisha Tyler, Scott Foley, Lea Michele, Chris Noth, Katey Sagal and Molly Ringwald.

No. overall	No. in season	Featured celebrity	Locations visited	Original release date
55	1	"Aisha Tyler"	Oberlin, Ohio; Cleveland, Ohio; Austin, Texas	April 3, 2016
56	2	"Scott Foley"	Washington, D.C.; Boston, Massachusetts; Salem, Massachusetts	April 10, 2016
57	3	"Katey Sagal"	New York, New York; Harrisburg, Pennsylvania	April 17, 2016
58	4	"Molly Ringwald"	Brooklyn, New York; Lund, Sweden; Höganäs, Sweden; Washington County, Nebraska; Arlington, Nebraska	April 24, 2016
59	5	"Chris Noth"	Chicago, Illinois; London, England; Elvas, Portugal; County Cavan, Ireland	May 1, 2016
60	6	"Lea Michele"	The Bronx, New York; Ellis Island	May 1, 2016

=== Season 8 (2017) ===
On June 9, 2016, the series was renewed for an eighth season consisting of 8 episodes which premiered on March 5, 2017. The list of celebrities that participated included Jessica Biel, Julie Bowen, Courteney Cox, Jennifer Grey, Smokey Robinson, John Stamos, Liv Tyler and Noah Wyle.

No. overall	No. in season	Featured celebrity	Locations visited	Original release date
61	1	"Courteney Cox"	Los Angeles, California; Gloucestershire, England; London, England	March 5, 2017
62	2	"Julie Bowen"	Chicago, Illinois; Washington, Pennsylvania	March 12, 2017
63	3	"Jennifer Grey"	Brooklyn, New York	March 19, 2017
64	4	"Noah Wyle"	Baton Rouge, Louisiana; Jackson, Mississippi; Beauvoir (Biloxi, Mississippi)	March 26, 2017
65	5	"Jessica Biel"	Los Angeles, California; Chicago, Illinois; St. Louis, Missouri; Miller County, Missouri; Washington, D.C.; Alton, Illinois	April 2, 2017
66	6	"Smokey Robinson"	Los Angeles, California; Memphis, Tennessee; Washington, D.C.; Fayette County, Tennessee	April 9, 2017
67	7	"John Stamos"	Athens, Greece; Levidi, Greece; Nafplio, Greece; Kakouri, Greece	April 16, 2017
68	8	"Liv Tyler"	Plattsburgh, New York; Washington, D.C.; Gettysburg, Pennsylvania; Schuylerville, New York	April 24, 2017

=== Season 9 (2018) ===
The series was renewed for a ninth season that premiered on May 21, 2018. The list of celebrity participants included Hilary Duff, Jean Smart, Jon Cryer, Laverne Cox, Megan Mullally and Molly Shannon.

No. overall	No. in season	Featured celebrity	Locations visited	Original release date
69	1	"Jon Cryer"	New York City, New York; Boston, Massachusetts; Edinburgh, Scotland; Dunbar, Scotland; Durham, England	May 21, 2018
70	2	"Laverne Cox"	Los Angeles, California; Mobile, Alabama; Montgomery, Alabama; Selma, Alabama; Cahaba, Alabama	May 21, 2018
71	3	"Megan Mullally"	Los Angeles, California; Morrow, Georgia; Washington, D.C.; Macon, Georgia	May 28, 2018
72	4	"Hilary Duff"	Los Angeles, California; Williamsburg, Virginia; Richmond, Virginia; Bath, North Carolina; Edinburgh, Scotland; Dunfermline, Scotland	June 4, 2018
73	5	"Molly Shannon"	Los Angeles, California; Dublin, Ireland; Achill Island, Ireland (Dugort & Bunnacurry)	June 11, 2018
74	6	"Jean Smart"	Los Angeles, California; Essex County, Massachusetts	June 18, 2018

=== Season 10 (2018) ===
The tenth season premiered on December 3, 2018. The list of celebrity participants included Mandy Moore, Regina King, Josh Duhamel and Matthew Morrison.

No. overall	No. in season	Featured celebrity	Locations visited	Original release date
75	1	"Mandy Moore"	Los Angeles, California; Sydney, Australia; Cashel, Ireland	December 3, 2018
76	2	"Josh Duhamel"	Los Angeles, California; Cambridge, England; London, England	December 10, 2018
77	3	"Regina King"	Los Angeles, California; Tuscaloosa, Alabama; Montgomery, Alabama	December 17, 2018
78	4	"Matthew Morrison"	Los Angeles, California; Charleston, South Carolina; Wilkes County, Georgia; Greenwood County, South Carolina	December 17, 2018

=== Season 11 (2022) ===
No. overall	No. in season	Featured celebrity	Locations visited	Original release date
79	1	"Billy Porter"	Pittsburgh, Pennsylvania; Richmond, Virginia; Lynchburg, Virginia	July 10, 2022
80	2	"Nick Offerman"	Albany, New York; Fonda, New York; Johnstown, New York; Danube, New York	July 17, 2022
81	3	"Allison Janney"	Bermuda; Jamestown, Virginia; Plymouth, Massachusetts	July 24, 2022
82	4	"Zachary Levi"	St. Louis; Washington, D.C.; Fairfield, Connecticut; Stamford, Connecticut	July 31, 2022
83	5	"Bradley Whitford"	Washington, D.C.; Vicksburg, Mississippi; Nebraska City, Nebraska	August 7, 2022
84	6	"Zachary Quinto"	Pittsburgh, Pennsylvania; College Park, Maryland; Reggia di Caserta, Italy; Lenola, Italy	August 14, 2022

== Reception ==
=== Awards and nominations ===
Year	Award	Category	Result	Ref.
2012	Primetime Creative Arts Emmy Awards	Outstanding Structured Reality Program	Nominated	
2014	Primetime Creative Arts Emmy Awards	Outstanding Structured Reality Program	Nominated	
2016	Primetime Creative Arts Emmy Awards	Outstanding Picture Editing for a Structured or Competition Reality Program (for "Bryan Cranston")	Won	
2017	Primetime Creative Arts Emmy Awards	Outstanding Structured Reality Program	Nominated	
2018	Critics' Choice Television Awards	Best Structured Reality Series	Nominated	
2018	Primetime Creative Arts Emmy Awards	Outstanding Structured Reality Program	Nominated	
2019	Primetime Creative Arts Emmy Awards	Outstanding Structured Reality Program	Nominated	

=== Ratings ===
==== Season 1: 2010 ====
No.	Episode	Rating/share (18–49)	Viewers (millions)	Rank (timeslot)	Rank (night)
1	"Sarah Jessica Parker"	1.6/6	6.85	2	5 (tied)
2	"Emmitt Smith"	1.8/6	7.15	2	5 (tied)
3	"Lisa Kudrow"	1.7/7	7.14	2	5
4	"Matthew Broderick"	1.5/2	6.21	3	8
5	"Brooke Shields"	1.4/6	5.90	1	6 (tied)
6	"Susan Sarandon"	1.3/5	6.35	1	2 (tied)
7	"Spike Lee"	1.2/5	5.21	2	8

==== Season 2: 2011 ====
No.	Episode	Rating/share (18–49)	Viewers (millions)	Rank (timeslot)	Rank (night)
1	"Vanessa Williams"	1.3/4	7.31	3 (tied)	6 (tied)
2	"Tim McGraw"	1.4/5	6.59	2	4 (tied)
3	"Rosie O'Donnell"	1.3/5	5.88	3 (tied)	8 (tied)
4	"Kim Cattrall"	1.2/4	6.18	3 (tied)	9 (tied)
5	"Lionel Richie"	1.2/4	6.11	2	6
6	"Steve Buscemi"	1.3/5	6.55 (Note: Nielsen split this episode into two, so a combined average is displayed here. The first half gained 6.36 million viewers with a 1.2/5 rating/share, ranked number 3 in the timeslot and number 16 for the night. The second half, which aired at 8:30 pm, gained 6.75 million viewers with a 1.3/5 rating/share, ranked number 3 in the timeslot and number 15 for the night.)	3	7
7	"Gwyneth Paltrow"	1.3/5	6.01 (Note: Nielsen split this episode into two, so a combined average is displayed here. The first half gained 5.94 million viewers with a 1.2/5 rating/share, ranked number 1 in the timeslot and number 13 for the night. The second half, which aired at 8:30 pm, gained 6.08 million viewers with a 1.3/4 rating/share, ranked number 1 in the timeslot and number 10 for the night.)	1	4 (tied)
8	"Ashley Judd"	1.3/4	5.76	1	6

==== Season 3: 2012 ====
No.	Episode	Rating/share (18–49)	Viewers (millions)	Rank (timeslot)	Rank (night)
1	"Martin Sheen"	1.1/4	6.02	4	9 (tied)
2	"Marisa Tomei"	1.3/4	5.59	4 (tied)	10 (tied)
3	"Blair Underwood"	1.0/3	4.99	4	11
4	"Reba McEntire"	1.5/5	7.60	3	7
5	"Jerome Bettis"	1.0/3	5.05	3 (tied)	10 (tied)
6	"Helen Hunt"	1.0/4	5.79	3 (tied)	5 (tied)
7	"Rita Wilson"	0.8/3	5.08	4	11
8	"Edie Falco"	0.8/3	4.54	4	11
9	"Rob Lowe"	1.0/4	5.25	4	10 (tied)
10	"Rashida Jones"	0.9/3	4.96	4	10 (tied)
11	"Jason Sudeikis"	0.8/3	4.76	4	11
12	"Paula Deen"	1.0/4	5.38	2	6

==== Season 4: 2013 ====
No.	Episode	Rating (18–49)	Viewers (millions)
1	"Kelly Clarkson"	0.4	1.61
2	"Christina Applegate"	0.6	2.19
3	"Chelsea Handler"	0.5	1.80
4	"Zooey Deschanel"	0.5	1.87
5	"Chris O'Donnell"	0.5	1.69
6	"Cindy Crawford"	0.5	1.82
7	"Trisha Yearwood"	0.3	1.54
8	"Jim Parsons"	0.6	2.09

==== Season 5: 2014–15 ====
No.	Episode	Rating (18–49)	Viewers (millions)
1	"Cynthia Nixon"	0.4	1.50
2	"Jesse Tyler Ferguson"	N/A	1.24
3	"Rachel McAdams"	0.4	1.37
4	"Valerie Bertinelli"	0.3	1.48
5	"Kelsey Grammer"	0.4	1.55
Special	"Minnie Driver"	0.3	1.34
6	"Julie Chen"	0.4	1.47
7	"Josh Groban"	0.3	1.36
8	"Angie Harmon"	0.3	1.40
9	"Sean Hayes"	0.4	1.53
10	"Tony Goldwyn"	0.2	1.19
11	"America Ferrera"	0.4	1.31
12	"Bill Paxton"	0.3	1.23
13	"Melissa Etheridge"	0.3	1.27

==== Season 6: 2015 ====
No.	Episode	Rating (18–49)	Viewers (millions)
1	"Ginnifer Goodwin"	0.3	1.43
2	"J.K. Rowling"	0.3	1.53
3	"Alfre Woodard"	0.2	1.21
4	"Into the Archives"	0.3	1.25
5	"Bryan Cranston"	0.2	1.27
6	"Tom Bergeron"	0.3	1.62

==== Season 7: 2016 ====
No.	Episode	Rating (18–49)	Viewers (millions)
1	"Aisha Tyler"	0.2	0.94
2	"Scott Foley"	0.2	1.35
3	"Katey Sagal"	0.3	1.39
4	"Molly Ringwald"	0.3	1.56
5	"Chris Noth"	0.3	1.33
6	"Lea Michele"	0.2	1.33

==== Season 8: 2017 ====
No.	Episode	Rating (18–49)	Viewers (millions)
1	"Courteney Cox"	0.2	1.35
2	"Julie Bowen"	0.2	1.33
3	"Jennifer Grey"	0.3	1.39
4	"Noah Wyle"	0.2	1.32
5	"Jessica Biel"	0.2	1.33
6	"Smokey Robinson"	0.3	1.45
7	"John Stamos"	0.4	1.59
8	"Liv Tyler"	0.3	1.23

==== Season 9: 2018 ====
No.	Episode	Rating (18–49)	Viewers (millions)
1	"Jon Cryer"	0.2	0.81
2	"Laverne Cox"	0.1	0.62
3	"Megan Mullally"	0.2	0.99
4	"Hilary Duff"	0.2	0.89
5	"Molly Shannon"	0.2	0.87
6	"Jean Smart"	0.1	0.87

==== Season 10: 2018 ====
No.	Episode	Rating (18–49)	Viewers (millions)
1	"Mandy Moore"	0.1	0.63
2	"Josh Duhamel"	0.1	0.69
3	"Regina King"	0.2	0.80
4	"Matthew Morrison"	0.1	0.60

==== Season 11: 2022 ====
No.	Episode	Rating/share (18–49)	Viewers (millions)	Rank (timeslot)	Rank (night)
1	"Billy Porter"	0.1/2	1.30	5	16 (tied)
2	"Nick Offerman"	0.2/3	1.92	3	10
3	"Allison Janney"	0.2/2	1.89	4	11 (tied)
4	"Zachary Levi"	0.2/3	2.01	4	10 (tied)
5	"Bradley Whitford"	0.1/1	1.61	6	22
6	"Zachary Quinto"	0.2/2	1.62	4	16

== DVD releases ==
Complete season	Release dates			DVD extras and bonus features	Number of discs
Complete season	Region 1	Region 2	Region 4	DVD extras and bonus features	Number of discs
Season 1	March 15, 2011	February 1, 2011	August 12, 2010	None	2
Season 2	May 1, 2012	February 20, 2012	TBA	TBA	2

== International distribution ==
- In Australia, season 1 began airing on the Nine Network on April 28, 2010. Season 2 and reruns of season 1 will now air on sister channel, GEM. For a reason unexplained by Nine, the episodes featuring Spike Lee and Emmitt Smith were not aired in initial Australian screenings.
- In the Republic of Ireland, the first season of the American version began airing on RTÉ One on Thursday, May 27, 2010, at 22:25. The second series premiered on RTÉ One on Monday, July 4, 2011, at 22:40.
- In the United Kingdom, the first season of the American version began airing on BBC One on Sunday, June 13, 2010, at 21:15. The show received the same voice-over as the British original series. The second series, premiered on Wednesday, November 16, 2011, at 22:45. The first episode shown was that following Steve Buscemi. The fourth series premiered on BBC1 at midnight on Tuesday, January 14, 2014. The order of celebrity is changed in the opening credits to Applegate, Clarkson, O'Donnell, Deschanel, Crawford and Parsons. Handler and Yearwood are not featured as they have little profile in the UK.
- In Sweden, the first season of the American version began airing with Swedish subtitles on SVT on Tuesday, September 14, 2010, at 13:20.
- In Greece, the first season of the American version began airing with Greek subtitles on Fox Life on Thursday, October 14, 2010, at 21:55.
- In Finland, the first season of the American version began airing with Finnish subtitles on MTV3 on Thursday December 30, 2010, at 20:00, called Sukujuuria etsimässä, "Looking for family roots".
- In Czech Republic, Slovakia, Hungary and Former Yugoslav republics, the American version airs on Universal Channel, the British version airs on Viasat History.
- In Romania, both versions began airing on January 1, 2019, only on Național 24 Plus.
- In The Netherlands, the American versions of season 1 and 2 aired on August 8, 2013.
- In Italy, the show began airing on Studio Universal on February 4, 2013. Reruns of season 2 and season 1 began airing on LaEFFE since May 2013.
- In Germany, it began airing on RTL Living on November 25, 2011. The network also aired the British version of the series on January 6, 2012.

== See also ==
- African American Lives
- Ancestors in the Attic
- Faces of America
- Finding Your Roots
- Genealogy Roadshow
