= Genealogy Roadshow (American TV series) =

2013 American TV documentary series

- Genre: Documentary
- Country of origin: United States
- Original language: English
- No. of seasons: 3

Original release
- Network: PBS
- Release: September 23, 2013 – June 28, 2016

Genealogy Roadshow is an American genealogy documentary series that debuted on PBS on September 23, 2013. The series explores the genealogies of those who attend a historically significant location in the United States, where a team of experienced genealogists present their research.

== Format ==
The series takes place in different historically significant locations in the United States. A team of genealogists—D. Joshua Taylor, Kenyatta D. Berry, and Mary M. Tedesco—present research to those who have sent in applications for research to appear on the show.

=== Other genealogists ===
- Emmett Miller

== Episodes ==
=== Season 1 (2013) ===
No. overall	No. in season	City	Location	Original release date
1	1	"Nashville, Tennessee"	TBA	September 23, 2013
2	2	"Detroit, Michigan"	Daley Rhea Mansion	September 30, 2013
3	3	"San Francisco, California"	San Francisco Mint	October 7, 2013
4	4	"Austin, Texas"	TBA	October 14, 2013

=== Season 2 (2015) ===
No. overall	No. in season	City	Location	Original release date
5	1	"New Orleans, Louisiana"	The Cabildo	January 13, 2015
6	2	"St. Louis, Missouri"	St. Louis Public Library	January 20, 2015
7	3	"Philadelphia, Pennsylvania"	Franklin Institute	January 27, 2015
8	4	"New Orleans, Louisiana"	Board of Trade	February 3, 2015
9	5	"St. Louis, Missouri"	St. Louis Union Station	February 10, 2015
10	6	"Philadelphia, Pennsylvania"	Historical Society of Pennsylvania	February 17, 2015

=== Season 3 (2016) ===
No. overall	No. in season	City	Location	Original release date
11	1	"Albuquerque, New Mexico"	Old Airport Terminal	May 17, 2016
12	2	"Miami, Florida"	HistoryMiami Museum	May 24, 2016
13	3	"Houston, Texas"	Julia Ideson Building	May 31, 2016
14	4	"Our Favorite Stories"	TBA	June 7, 2016
15	5	"Boston, Massachusetts"	Faneuil Hall	June 14, 2016
16	6	"Providence, Rhode Island"	Providence Public Library	June 21, 2016
17	7	"Los Angeles, California"	Union Station	June 28, 2016

== See also ==
- Finding Your Roots
- African American Lives
- Ancestors in the Attic
- Faces of America
- Who Do You Think You Are?
