= Ancestors in the Attic =

Ancestors in the Attic is a Canadian television program about genealogy presented by Reader's Digest Canada and shown on History Television in Canada. It was hosted by Jeff Douglas with professional genealogist Paul J. McGrath until his death on 23 October 2008 while filming in Edinburgh, Scotland. The program is produced by Primitive Entertainment and debuted October 18, 2006. The series was based on an original idea from Dugald Maudsley and his father Donald Maudsley. Dugald Maudsley, who now leads Infield Fly Productions, was the series producer. Ancestors in the Attic was co-created with History Television and ran for 49 episodes. The series took everyday people on journeys from Africa to Ukraine and from Nunavut to Japan using genealogy to solve family mysteries.

== See also ==
- African American Lives
- Finding Your Roots
- Faces of America
- Who Do You Think You Are?
- Genealogy Roadshow
