= Finding Your Roots =

American documentary television series

- Title card from the second season
- Also known as: Finding Your Roots with Henry Louis Gates, Jr.
- Genre: Family history; Genealogy; Documentary series
- Written by: Henry Louis Gates Jr.
- Directed by: John Maggio; Jesse Sweet; Caitlin McNally; Jack Youngelson; Sabin Streeter; Julia Marchesi
- Presented by: Henry Louis Gates Jr.
- Composer: Michael Bacon
- Country of origin: United States
- Original language: English
- No. of seasons: 12
- No. of episodes: 116 (list of episodes)

Production
- Executive producer: Henry Louis Gates Jr.
- Producers: Rachel Dretzin; Leslie Asako Gladsjo; Dyllan McGee; Peter Kunhardt; Stephen Segaller
- Running time: 51–53 minutes
- Production companies: Kunhardt McGee Productions; Inkwell Films; Ark Media

Original release
- Network: PBS
- Release: March 25, 2012 – present

Related
- Faces of America

Finding Your Roots with Henry Louis Gates, Jr. is an American documentary television series hosted by Henry Louis Gates Jr. that premiered on March 25, 2012, on PBS. In each episode, celebrities are presented with a "book of life" that is compiled with information researched by professional genealogists that allows them to view their ancestral histories, learn about familial connections and discover secrets about their lineage.

All episodes to date for the show have aired on Tuesdays since it first began in March 2012. The eleventh season began airing on January 7, 2025, and ended on April 8, 2025. The twelfth season premiered on January 6, 2026, and ended on April 14, 2026.

== Premise ==
The series uses traditional genealogical research (written records) and genetics (DNA testing) to discover the family history of well-known people. Genetic techniques include Y-chromosome DNA, mitochondrial DNA, and autosomal DNA analyses to infer both ancient and recent genetic relationships. The show's professionals typically spend hundreds of hours researching each guest.

Each celebrity guest is given a "book of life", which contains all the information discovered about the guest's genealogy by researchers. Included in or within the book are comprehensive genetic results, a family tree that is as complete as paper research allows, copies of historical records used to assemble each tree and photos of newly found family members. In some episodes, particularly ones in which original DNA profiling research must be used to establish a past ancestor's parental link, guests are reunited with long lost relatives. However, in most episodes, each guest is predominantly shown seated opposite Gates as he guides them through their book of life. To show correlations between the guests' family stories, each episode cuts back and forth between two or three guest stories. To draw further correlations, Gates uses examples from his own genealogy quite frequently. Examples of this would be a grandmother of his having multiple children with a white man whose name she had never revealed, as well as Gates's membership into the Sons of the American Revolution.

In addition to celebrity guests, everyday people are sometimes featured in an episode to create a third or fourth story line. The non-celebrity guests are usually a group of peers. One example of this would be the episode in which Gates has his friends at his local barbershop take a DNA test to determine their ethnic makeup, with each friend betting on their percentages of African, European, and Native American genetic heritage. Another episode uses a similar guessing game with students at a local school. Singular secondary guests include Robert Downey Sr. and Margarett Cooper, the latter being a friend of Gates's. The finale of Season 10 featured three ordinary people who wanted to solve mysteries.

== Episodes ==
Season	Episodes	Originally released	
Season	Episodes	First released	Last released
1	10	March 25, 2012	May 20, 2012
2	10	September 23, 2014	November 25, 2014
3	10	January 5, 2016	March 8, 2016
4	10	October 3, 2017	December 19, 2017
5	10	January 8, 2019	April 9, 2019
6	16	October 8, 2019	February 25, 2020
7	10	October 13, 2020	May 4, 2021
8	10	January 4, 2022	April 19, 2022
9	10	January 3, 2023	April 4, 2023
10	10	January 2, 2024	April 9, 2024
11	10	January 7, 2025	April 8, 2025
12	10	January 6, 2026	April 14, 2026

== Production ==
=== Background ===
The series has seen two past incarnations on PBS, both of which were hosted by Henry Louis Gates Jr. In 2006 and 2008, the series African American Lives aired. Both seasons of the series consisted of a season-long storyline as well as an all African American cast. In 2010, Faces of America aired. Though it continued to use the season-long plot from the prior installment, it was the first installment to be hosted by Gates which included Americans of all ethnic and racial backgrounds. Starting with Finding Your Roots in 2012, the series changed from a season-long plot to having plots extending only within a single episode. In doing so, it has allowed the series to extend its number of episodes each season to ten, as opposed to the prior four episodes a season.

=== Ben Affleck controversy ===
The show's third season was postponed by WNET after it was discovered that actor Ben Affleck had persuaded Gates to omit information about his slave-owning ancestors. The series returned on January 5, 2016, although "Roots of Freedom", the second-season episode featuring Affleck, was pulled from all forms of distribution by PBS.

== Critical reception ==
In 2016, Cal Thomas of The Baltimore Sun wrote that the show was "The most compelling television you will ever see." In 2015, it was nominated for an NAACP Image Award for Outstanding News/Information – Series or Special. Lauren Sarner of New York Post wrote, "Finding Your Roots has become a phenomenon."

== See also ==
- African American Lives
- Ancestors in the Attic
- Faces of America
- Who Do You Think You Are?
- Genealogy Roadshow
