= Mark D. Shriver =

American geneticist

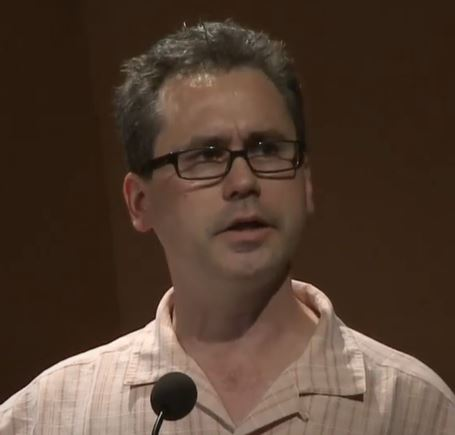
- Shriver in 2013
- Born: June 18, 1965 (age 61)
- Education: State University of New York; University of Texas Health Science Center
- Scientific career
- Fields: Population genetics
- Workplaces: Pennsylvania State University; Morehouse College

Mark D. Shriver is an American population geneticist. He leads genetic research at the Pennsylvania State University.

== Education ==
Shriver studied Biology at the State University of New York at Stony Brook, earning a B.S in 1987. He furthered his studies and earned a Ph.D. in Genetics at the University of Texas Health Science Center, Houston in 1993.

== Career ==
Shriver's work is focused on admixture mapping, signatures of natural selection, and phenotypic variability in common trait variation. A major goal of his work is to apply these methods and understanding of genomic variation to studies of common diseases (e.g. obesity, type 2 diabetes, adaptation to altitude, hypertension and prostate cancer), and to normal variation, in particular skin pigmentation and response to UVR. More recently, his research has focused on the genetics of facial features.

Shriver has consulted for and appeared in several documentaries about ancestry, race, and recent human evolution. Most notably, he was featured in the 2006 PBS series African American Lives and the 2008 series African American Lives 2 (hosted by Henry Louis Gates) . He also appeared in the BBC Two film Motherland: A Genetic Journey (2003), the BBC documentary, "The Difference", French television's "Tracked Down by Our Genes" (2007), and UK Channel 4's "Human Mutants" (2004).

Shriver is a Professor of Anthropology at the Pennsylvania State University in State College, Pennsylvania. From 2009 to 2010, he was on sabbatical as an associate professor of biology at Morehouse College in Atlanta, Georgia. In 2006, he was a visiting professor at both Trinity College Dublin and University College Dublin.

== Personal life ==
Shriver has made public the discovery of his own recent West African ancestry (22%). In 2007, he married science writer and former broadcast meteorologist Katrina Voss with whom he has three young children, Hector, Darwin, and Huxley.
