= Defenders of the Faith (Puerto Rico) =

Puerto Rican Christian denomination

Defenders of the Faith is a Christian denomination with a significant presence in Puerto Rico and (to a lesser extent) in the United States. It was formed in 1925 by an interdenominational group of pastors and laymen headed by Dr. Gerald B. Winrod, an independent Baptist preacher. Its main program consists of publishing a magazine, The Defender, and numerous pamphlets and tracts. American congregations are located primarily in the New York City and Chicago metropolitan areas. In 1968, there were 14 churches and approximately 2,000 members in the U.S.; further, there are 68 churches and 6,000 members in Puerto Rico.
