= White Puerto Ricans =

Puerto Ricans of European ancestry

Puertorriqueños blancos (Spanish)

Total population
- 560,592 (2020); 17.1% of the Puerto Rican population (White alone); 55.6% of the Puerto Rican population (White alone or in combination.)

Regions with significant populations
- Throughout Puerto Rico

Languages
- Spanish (Puerto Rican Spanish) • English (Puerto Rican English) • Spanglish

Religion
- Catholicism • Protestantism • Judaism

Related ethnic groups
- European Caribbeans, European Hispanic and Latino Americans, Puerto Rican Americans, White Cubans, White Dominicans

In the 2020 United States census of Puerto Rico, the number of people who indicated "White alone" for their race was 536,044 or 16.5%, with an additional non-Hispanic 24,548, for a total population of 560,592 or 17.1% of the population.

Aside from Spanish—largely Canarian—settlers, additional Europeans of many families from France, the United Kingdom, Portugal, Italy, Germany, Ireland, Scandinavia, among others, immigrated to Puerto Rico when the island was an Overseas Province of Spain, particularly during the 1800s due to the Royal Decree of Graces of 1815, where Spain encouraged immigration from other European countries to Puerto Rico.

== Population history ==
An early Census on the island was conducted by Governor Lieutenant General Francisco Manuel de Lando in 1530. A 1765 census was taken by Lieutenant General Alexander O'Reilly which (according to some sources) showed 17,572 whites out of a total population of 44,883. All censuses from 1765 to 1887 were taken by the Spanish government who conducted at irregular intervals. The 1899 census was taken by the War Ministry of the United States. Since 1910 Puerto Rico has been included in every decennial census taken by the United States.

European / white population census 1765 - 2020
Year	Population	%	Ref(s)
1765	17,572	-	
1775	30,709	40.4	
1787	46,756	45.5	
1802	78,281	48.0	
1812	85,662	46.8	
1820	102,432	44.4	
1827	150,311	49.7	
1836	188,869	52.9	
1860	300,406	51.5	
1877	411,712	56.3	
1887	474,933	59.5	
1897	573,187	64.3	
1899	589,426	61.8	
1910	732,555	65.5	
1920	948,709	73.0	
1930	1,146,719	74.3	
1940	1,430,744	76.5	
1950	1,762,411	79.7	
2000	3,064,862	80.5	
2010	2,825,100	75.8	
2020	560,592	17.1	

== Definition in Puerto Rico ==
White Puerto Ricans are Puerto Ricans who self-identify as "white", typically due to predominant European ancestry. Historically, the concept has its origins in a post-colonial era in which the Council of the Indies had stipulated that it was "useful and necessary" to keep the "contaminated castes" apart from the whites and the legitimate mestizos (here meaning of mixed white-colored blood through four generations of legitimate parentage with one parent in each generation having been white), "and in a class excluded from the public offices and honors, distinctions, and prerogatives" to which only whites and mestizos were privileged. Thus, the free-colored population was stigmatized as being among the "contaminated castes" ineligible to possess the rights and exercise the privileges thereof, including holding public office. As a result, many free people of color sought the status of legal whiteness but were required to prove "free and legitimate descent of four generations" in order to obtain full citizenship and bureaucratic opportunity unavailable to free people of color. As a result, the process of whitening one's lineage was normalized. The term "white Puerto Rican", as well as that of "colored Puerto Rican", was coined by the United States Department of Defense in order to handle their own North American problem with nonwhite people whom they were drafting and had its basis on the American one-drop rule.

== European settlement ==
=== Spain ===
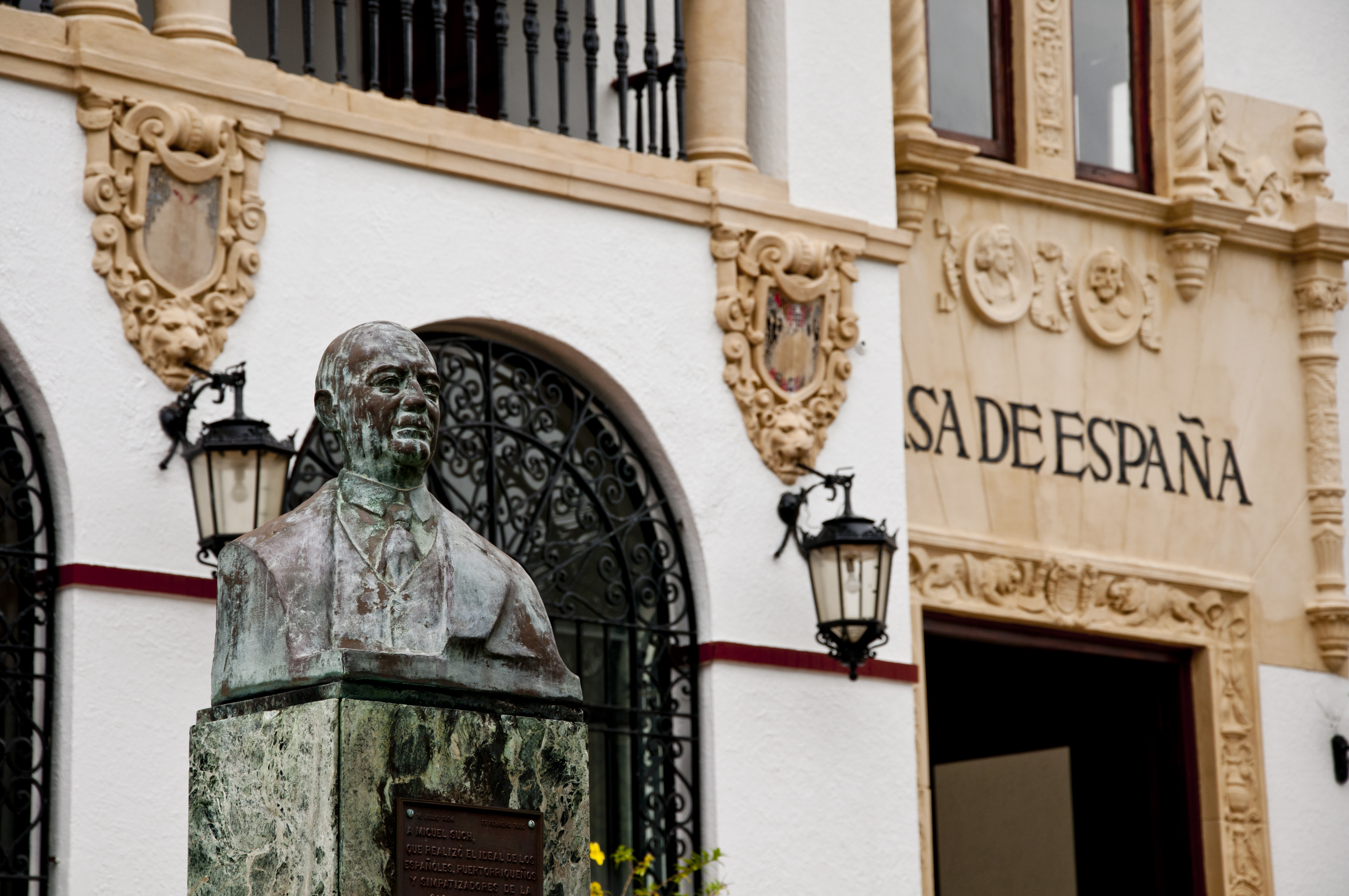
The Casa de España, situated in Old San Juan, was used as the headquarters of a private social organization whose members were Spanish citizens or those of Spanish descent.

Puerto Rico was a Spanish Overseas Province for nearly 400 years. The bulk of Puerto Ricans' European ancestry is from Spain. In 1899, one year after the United States invaded and took control of the island, 61.8% of people were identified as White. In the 2020 United States Census the total of Puerto Ricans that identified as White was 17.1%. The European heritage of Puerto Ricans comes primarily from one source: Spaniards (including Canarians, Catalans, Castilians, Galicians, Asturians, and Andalusians) and Basques. Though, the Canary Islands of Spain has had the most influence on Puerto Rico, and is where most Puerto Ricans can trace their ancestry. It is estimated up to 82% of Puerto Ricans are partially descended from people from the southern regions of Spain, Andalusia and the Canary Islands.

=== Canary Islanders ===
The first wave of Canarian migration to Puerto Rico seems to be in 1695, followed by others in 1714, 1720, 1731, and 1797. The number of Canarians that immigrated to Puerto Rico in the first three centuries of Iberian rule is not known to any degree of precision. However, Dr. Estela Cifré de Loubriel and other scholars of the Canarian migration to America, such as Dr. Manuel González Hernández of the University of La Laguna, Tenerife, agree that they formed the bulk of the jíbaro, or white peasant stock, of the mountainous interior of the island.

The Isleños increased their commercial traffic and immigration to the two remaining Spanish colonies in America, Puerto Rico and Cuba. Even after the Spanish–American War of 1898, Canarian immigration to the Americas continued. Successive waves of Canarian immigration continued to arrive in Puerto Rico, where entire villages were founded by relocated islanders.

In the 1860s, Canarian immigration to America took place at the rate of over 2,000 per year, at a time when the total island population was 237,036. In the two-year period 1885–1886, more than 4,500 Canarians emigrated to Spanish possessions, with only 150 to Puerto Rico. Between 1891 and 1895 Canarian immigrants to Puerto Rico numbered 600. These are official figures; if illegal or concealed emigration is taken into account, the numbers may be much larger.

The Canarian cultural influence in Puerto Rico is one of the most important components in that many villages were founded by these immigrants, starting in 1493 until 1890 and beyond. Many Spaniards, especially Canarians, chose Puerto Rico because of its Hispanic ties and relative proximity in comparison with other former Spanish colonies. They searched for security and stability in an environment similar to that of the Canary Islands and Puerto Rico was the most suitable. This began as a temporary exile which became a permanent relocation and the last significant wave of Spanish or European migration to Puerto Rico.

== Royal Decree of Graces of 1815 ==
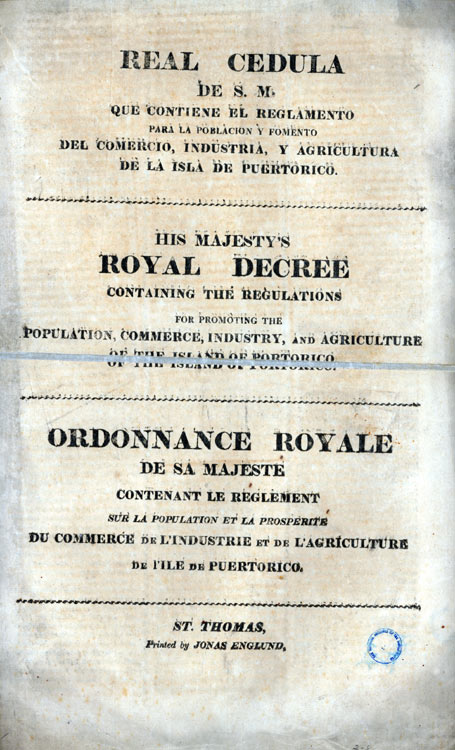
Royal Decree of Graces, 1815

By 1825, the Spanish Empire had lost all of its territories in the Americas with the exception of Cuba and Puerto Rico. These two possessions, however, had been demanding more autonomy since the formation of pro-independence movements in 1808. Realizing that it was in danger of losing its two remaining Caribbean territories, the Spanish Crown revived the Royal Decree of Graces of 1815.

The decree was printed in three languages—Spanish, French, and English—intending to attract mainland Spaniards and other Europeans, with the hope that the independence movements would lose their popularity and strength with the arrival of new settlers.

Under the Spanish Royal Decree of Graces, immigrants were granted land and initially given a "Letter of Domicile" after swearing loyalty to the Spanish Crown and allegiance to the Catholic Church. After five years they could request a "Letter of Naturalization" that would make them Spanish subjects. The Royal Decree was intended for non-Hispanic Europeans and not Asians nor people that were not Christian.

In 1897, the Spanish Cortes also granted Puerto Rico a Charter of Autonomy, which recognized the island's sovereignty and right to self-government. By April 1898, the first Puerto Rican legislature was elected and called to order.

=== Corsica ===
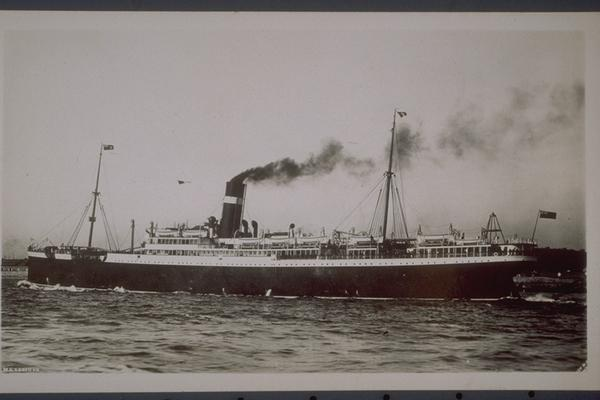
Type of steamship in which Corsicans arrived in Puerto Rico

Hundreds of Corsicans and their families immigrated to Puerto Rico from as early as 1830, and their numbers peaked in the early 1900s. The first Spanish settlers settled and owned the land in the coastal areas, the Corsicans tended to settle the mountainous southwestern region of the island, primary in the towns of Adjuntas, Lares, Utuado, Ponce, Coamo, Yauco, Guayanilla and Guánica. However, it was Yauco whose rich agricultural area attracted the majority of the Corsican settlers. The three main crops in Yauco were coffee, sugar cane and tobacco. The new settlers dedicated themselves to the cultivation of these crops and within a short period of time some were even able to own and operate their own grocery stores. However, it was with the cultivation of the coffee bean that they would make their fortunes. The descendants of the Corsican settlers were also to become influential in the fields of education, literature, journalism and politics.

Today the town of Yauco is known as both the "Corsican Town" and "The Coffee Town". There's a memorial in Yauco with the inscription, "To the memory of our citizens of Corsican origin, France, who in the C19 became rooted in our village, who have enriched our culture with their traditions and helped our progress with their dedicated work - the municipality of Yauco pays them homage." The Corsican element of Puerto Rico is very much in evidence, Corsican surnames such as Paoli, Negroni and Fraticelli are common.

=== France ===
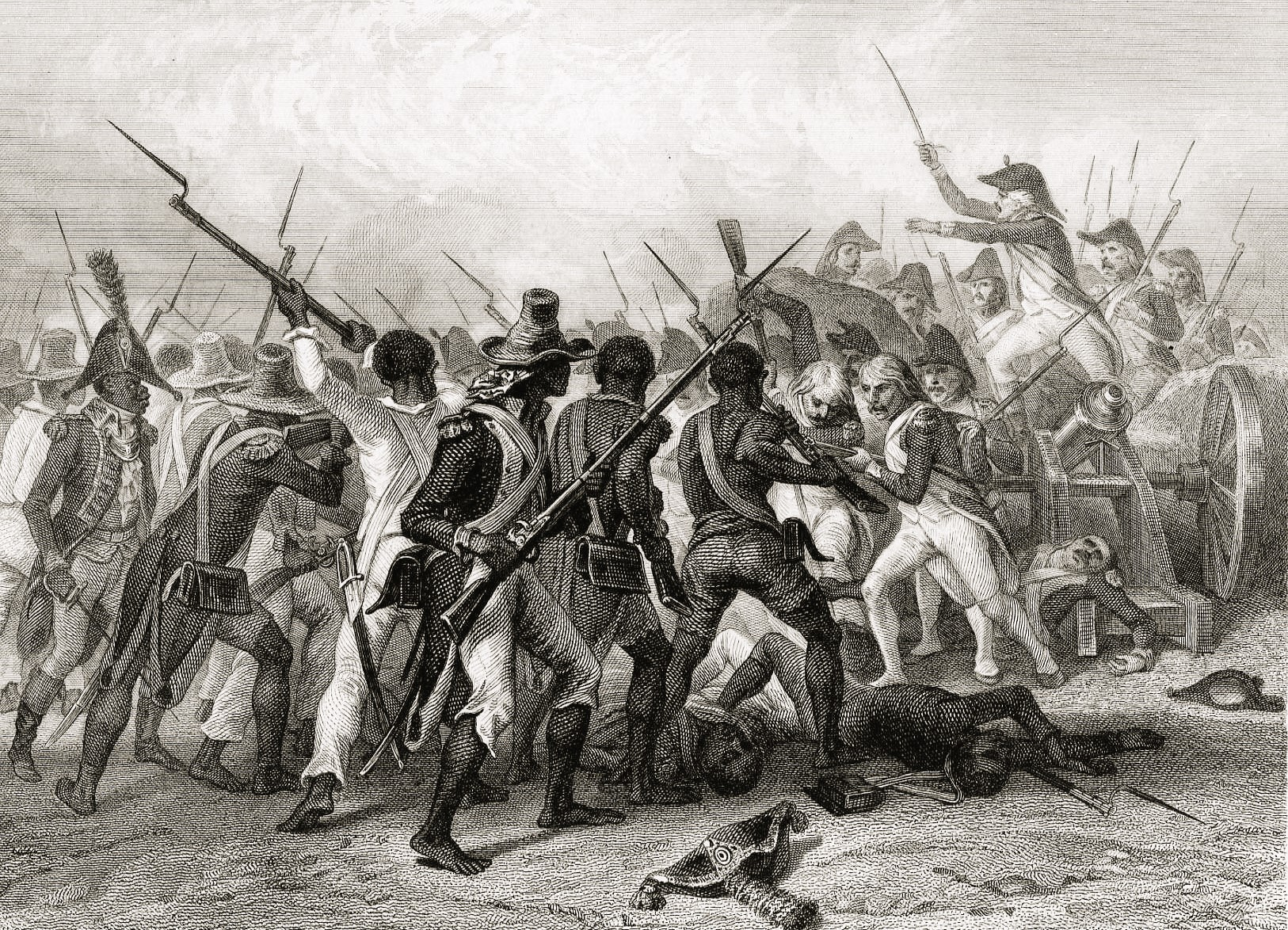
The Haitian Revolution led to an exodus of French colonists to Puerto Rico

The French immigration to Puerto Rico began as a result of the economic and political situations which occurred in various places such as Louisiana (United States) and Saint-Domingue (Haiti). Upon the outbreak of the French and Indian War, also known as the Seven Years' War (1754–1763), between the Kingdom of Great Britain and its North American Colonies against France, many of the French settlers fled to Puerto Rico. French immigration from mainland France and its territories to Puerto Rico was the largest in number, second only to Spanish immigrants and today a great number of Puerto Ricans can claim French ancestry; 16 percent of the surnames on the island are either French or French-Corsican.

Their influence in Puerto Rican culture is very much present and in evidence in the island's cuisine, literature and arts. Their contributions can be found, but are not limited to, the fields of education, commerce, politics, science and entertainment.

=== Germany ===
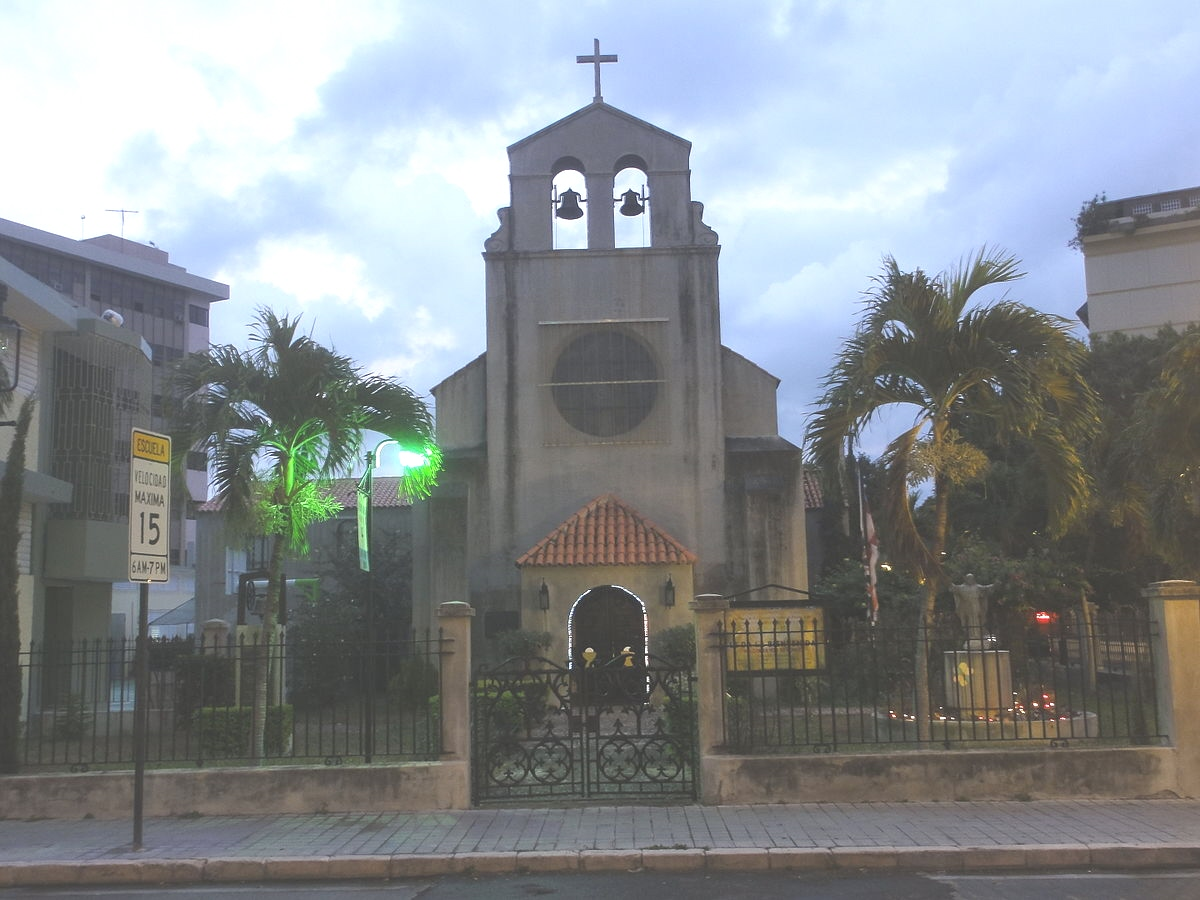
Iglesia Santísima Trinidad in Ponce

German immigrants arrived in Puerto Rico from Curaçao and Austria during the early 19th century. Many of these early German immigrants established warehouses and businesses in the coastal towns of Fajardo, Arroyo, Ponce, Mayaguez, Cabo Rojo and Aguadilla. One of the reasons that these businessmen established themselves in the island was that Germany depended mostly on Britain for such products as coffee, sugar and tobacco. By establishing businesses dedicated to the exportation and importation of these and other goods, Germany no longer had to depend on British sellers for such goods. Not all of the immigrants were businessmen; some were teachers, farmers and skilled laborers.

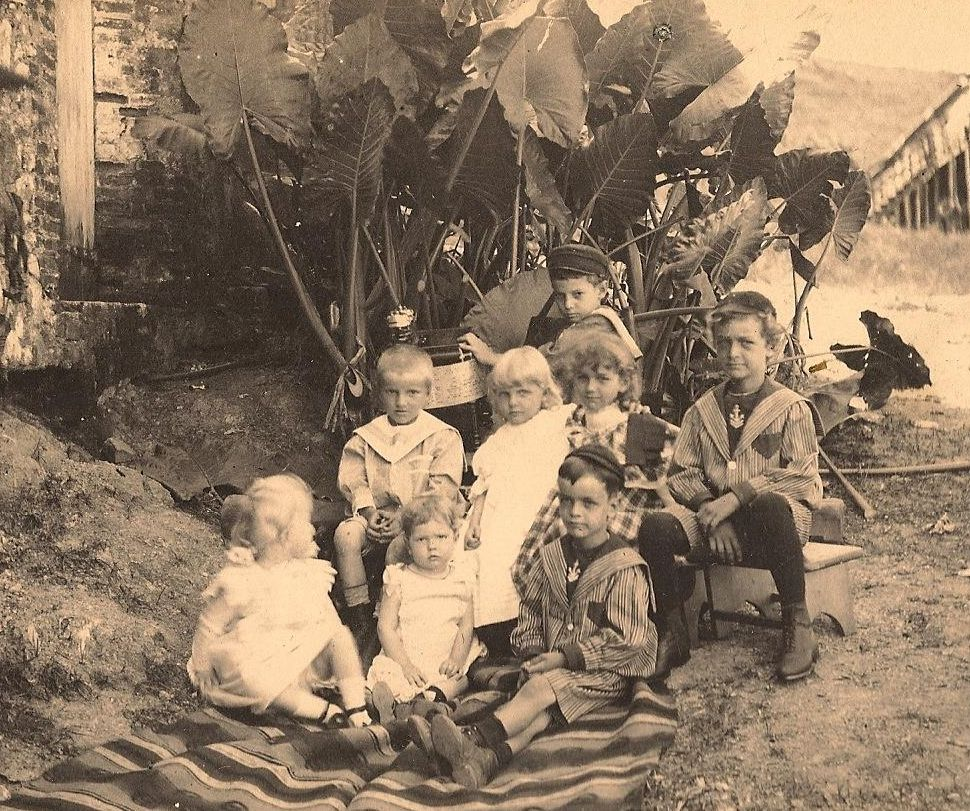
The Riefkohl and Verges children of Maunabo, Puerto Rico (c. 1890s)

In Germany the European Revolutions of 1848 in the German states erupted, leading to the Frankfurt Parliament. Ultimately, the rather non-violent "revolution" failed. Disappointed, many Germans immigrated to the Americas, including Puerto Rico, and were dubbed the Forty-Eighters. The majority of these came from Alsace-Lorraine, Baden, Hesse, Rheinland and Württemberg. German immigrants were able to settle in the coastal areas and establish their businesses in towns such as Fajardo, Arroyo, Ponce, Mayagüez, Cabo Rojo and Aguadilla. Those who expected free land under the terms of the Spanish Royal Decree, settled in the central mountainous areas of the island in towns such as Adjuntas, Aibonito and Ciales among others. They made their living in the agricultural sector and in some cases became owners of sugar cane plantations. Others dedicated themselves to the fishing industry.

In 1870, the Spanish Courts passed the Acta de Culto Condicionado (Conditional Cult Act), a law granting the right of religious freedom to all those who wished to worship another religion other than the Catholic religion. The Anglican Church, the Iglesia Santísima Trinidad, was founded by German and English immigrants in Ponce in 1872.

By the beginning of the 20th century, many of the descendants of the first German settlers had become successful businessmen, educators, and scientists and were among the pioneers of Puerto Rico's television industry. Among the successful businesses established by the German immigrants in Puerto Rico were Mullenhoff & Korber, Frite, Lundt & Co., Max Meyer & Co. and Feddersen Willenk & Co. Korber Group Inc., one of Puerto Rico's largest advertising agencies, was founded by the descendants of William Korber.

=== Ireland ===
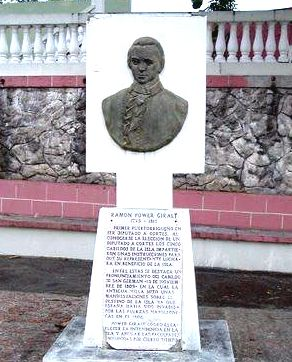
Plaque honoring Ramon Power y Giralt in San German, Puerto Rico

From the 16th to the 19th century, there was considerable Irish immigration to Puerto Rico, for a number of reasons. During the 16th century, many Irish soldiers deserted from English service and joined the Spanish army. Some of these men were stationed in Puerto Rico and remained there after their military service to Spain was completed. During the 18th century men such as Field Marshal Alejandro O'Reilly and Colonel Tomas O'Daly were sent to the island to revamp the capital's fortifications. O'Reilly was later appointed governor of colonial Louisiana in 1769 where he became known as "Bloody O'Reilly". Irish immigrants played an instrumental role in the island's economy. One of the most important industries of the island was the sugar industry. Besides Tomás O'Daly, whose plantation was a success, other Irishmen became successful businessmen in this industry, among them Miguel Conway, who owned a plantation in the town of Hatillo and Juan Nagle whose plantation was located in Río Piedras. Puerto Ricans of Irish descent also played an instrumental role in the development of the island's tobacco industry. Miguel Conboy is credited with being the founder of the tobacco trade in Puerto Rico and the Quinlan family established two tobacco plantations, one in the town of Toa Baja and the other in Loíza.

The Irish element in Puerto Rico is very much in evidence. Their contributions to Puerto Rico's agricultural industry and to the field of politics and education are highly notable.

=== Other immigration sources ===
Other sources of European populations are Basques, Portuguese, Italians, French people, Scots, Dutch, English, Danes. Further sources include white populations originating from New World countries like the United States, the Dominican Republic and Cuba.

== Present day Puerto Rico ==
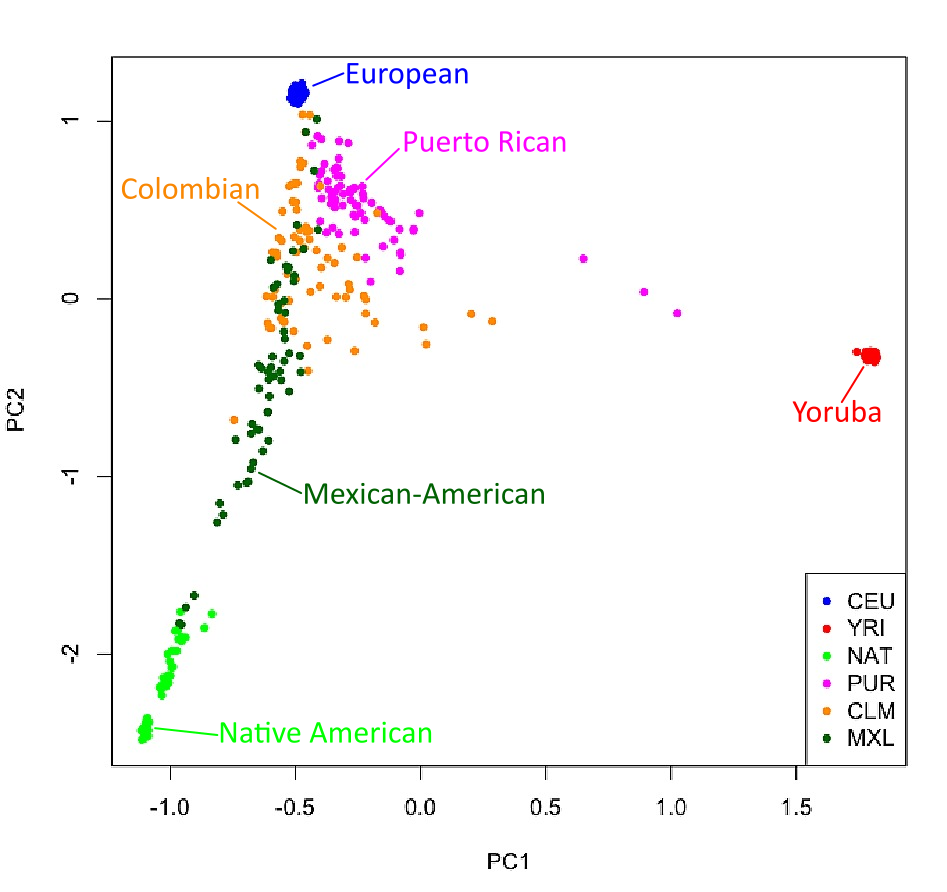
Principal component analysis of the genomes of Puerto Ricans (pink), White Europeans (blue), Colombians (orange), Mexicans (green), Native Americans (lime) and West African Yoruba (peach)

By the middle of the 20th century, Puerto Rico was nearly 80% European, in part due to the Royal Decree of Graces of 1815, when the central government of Spain granted free land to mainland Spaniards and other European Catholics willing to settle in Puerto Rico. Though most Puerto Ricans self identified as European only, many have varying degrees of Taino (Native Puerto Rican) ancestry as well. In 1802, the options available on the Census documents were either "black" or "white" and people were no longer able to indicate Indio on the census self identification, so they were no longer counted. Before that, in 1797, 2,312 had self-identified as Indio. Evidence suggests that some Taíno men and African women inter-married and lived in relatively isolated Maroon communities in the interior of the islands, where they evolved into a hybrid rural or campesino population with little or no interference from the Spanish authorities.

Studies have shown that European ancestry is strongest on the west side of the island, African ancestry mostly found on the east, and consistent levels of Taino ancestry throughout the island. In fact, even though 75% of Puerto Ricans self-identify as European only, it is estimated only about 25% are of nearly pure European ancestry with little to no non-European admixture. As mentioned above, this is partly due to North African ancestry inherited from Spanish immigrants from the Canary Islands, and even moreso due to the white European/North African settler population in Puerto Rico reproducing with Native Tainos and black West African slaves.

== Population by municipalities ==
The population from the 2020 census who self-identified as white in the census by municipality is as follows:

Municipality	%	Municipality	%
Adjuntas	22.2	Juncos	13.0
Aguada	22.7	Lajas	18.9
Aguadilla	21.0	Lares	20.5
Aguas Buenas	14.5	Las Marías	17.2
Aibonito	19.4	Las Piedras	15.6
Añasco	18.4	Loíza	5.8
Arecibo	19.0	Luquillo	17.2
Arroyo	11.5	Manatí	17.1
Barceloneta	15.8	Maricao	22.2
Barranquitas	20.8	Maunabo	9.1
Bayamón	17.9	Mayagüez	19.7
Cabo Rojo	20.3	Moca	17.0
Caguas	15.9	Morovis	19.1
Camuy	22.7	Naguabo	13.3
Canóvanas	13.4	Naranjito	20.7
Carolina	14.2	Orocovis	16.3
Cataño	13.0	Patillas	15.9
Cayey	17.4	Peñuelas	23.1
Ceiba	16.0	Ponce	19.0
Ciales	20.8	Quebradillas	25.4
Cidra	19.5	Rincón	21.4
Coamo	20.0	Río Grande	14.7
Comerío	16.9	Sabana Grande	19.9
Corozal	19.8	Salinas	16.3
Culebra	17.7	San Germán	18.5
Dorado	17.6	San Juan	14.4
Fajardo	14.5	San Lorenzo	14.0
Florida	13.8	San Sebastián	19.2
Guánica	17.1	Santa Isabel	15.7
Guayama	19.0	Toa Alta	16.2
Guayanilla	18.1	Toa Baja	16.3
Guaynabo	17.2	Trujillo Alto	14.2
Gurabo	15.2	Utuado	21.6
Hatillo	21.2	Vega Alta	12.4
Hormigueros	18.8	Vega Baja	18.5
Humacao	13.5	Vieques	18.8
Isabela	17.5	Villalba	15.5
Jayuya	23.3	Yabucoa	16.5
Juana Díaz	14.5	Yauco	21.4

== See also ==
- Cultural diversity in Puerto Rico
- French immigration to Puerto Rico
- German immigration to Puerto Rico
- Irish immigration to Puerto Rico
- History of the Jews in Puerto Rico
- Isleño
- List of Puerto Ricans
- Puerto Rican people
- Racial Passing
- Racism in Puerto Rico
- Spanish people
- White Americans
- White Hispanic and Latino Americans
- White Latin Americans
