= Racism in Puerto Rico =

Historically, Puerto Rico, which is now an unincorporated territory of the U.S., has been dominated by a settler society of religiously and ethnically diverse Europeans, primarily of Spanish descent, and Sub-Saharan Africans. The majority of Puerto Ricans are multi-ethnic, including people of European, African, Asian, Native American, and of mixed-ethnic descent.

== History ==
Before the first major influx of West Africans into Puerto Rico in the 16th century, Spanish colonizers forced the Taíno natives "into slavery, exploiting their labor in the gold mines and on plantations." After nearly a century of exploitation, enslavement, murder, and decline of the Taíno people, Spanish colonizers looked to a new source of slave labor. In 1598 they signed their first contract to bring a large number of West Africans to Puerto Rico. Gold mines, ginger plantations and sugar plantations heavily relied on the slave work from the Taíno and West Africans. Since the majority of the European and African colonizers and enslaved laborers arrived without women, intermarriage often occurred with the remaining Taíno women. The offspring from these interracial relationships created a population of Mulattos and Mestizos.

When the gold mines were declared depleted in 1570 and mining came to an end in Puerto Rico, the vast majority of the white Spanish settlers left the island to seek their fortunes in the richer colonies, such as Mexico, and the island became a Spanish garrison. The majority of those who stayed behind were either black or mulatto. The next major wave of West African slaves into Puerto Rico came after The Royal Decree of Graces of 1789, which allowed Spanish subjects in the Caribbean to participate in the business of slave trade and labor, particular importing slaves from the Gold Coast.

By the time Spain reestablished her commercial ties with Puerto Rico, the island had a large multi-ethnic population. Those demographics, though, changed during the 19th century when the Spanish Crown issued the Royal Decree of Graces of 1815 which also resulted in "whitening" Puerto Rico's population from its offering of land, agricultural, and labor incentives to non-Hispanic white Europeans. The new arrivals continued to intermarry with the native islanders. "The Royal census of Puerto Rico in 1834 established that the island's population as 42,000 enslaved Africans, 25,000 colored freemen, 189,000 people who identified themselves as whites and 101,000 who were described as being of mixed ethnicity." A number of slave uprisings in plantations took place between 1820 and 1868. Puerto Rico abolished slavery in 1873.

== Discrimination ==
The term "white Puerto Rican", as well as that of "colored Puerto Rican", was coined by the United States Department of Defense in the first decade of the 20th century in order to handle their own North American problem with nonwhite people whom they were drafting and had its basis on the American one-drop rule. The one-drop rule stated that if you had just one drop of Black blood in you, you were Black, not white; that is, if you are not 100% white, then no matter what shade of lightness you are, you are Black. The white upper class made deals with U.S. industrialists and supported U.S. policies in Puerto Rico at the expense of Afro-Puerto Rican civil rights. Puerto Rico passed the Civil Rights Act of Puerto Rico in 1943.

In 1945, Eric Williams wrote that like the Virgin Islands, There was an "absence of legal discrimination" in Puerto Rico, further stating that "Children of all colors meet on equal terms in the public schools, though discrimination is prevalent in private schools, even those which receive government grants. There are no segregated housing areas. Whites, blacks and mulattoes sit side by side in theaters, churches and public vehicles, and lie side by side in the cemeteries." Williams noted how social discrimination increased prior to the passage of the 1943 civil rights and touted the law's benefits. Williams specified that the 1943 civil rights law "recognizes no differences based on race, color, creed, national origin or previous condition" and guarantees "the right of all persons irrespective of differences of race, creed or political affiliation to enjoy the facilities afforded by public places, businesses and any agency of the Insular Government." Williams even noted that "Lynchings are unheard of" in Puerto Rico. William further noted that "Legally, the Negro is on a footing of equality with the white man" and that while social level equality was still not yet realized, "social discrimination does not affect the large majority of colored people," noting how private employment discrimination was most obvious in "upper brackets."

Williams also touted the progress of the University of Puerto Rico" noting that "In the University of Puerto Rico, colored students, the majority destined to be schoolteachers, are freely admitted," though he also noted some negative aspects of the University's environment, stating that "Yet two members of the faculty, in a special study of the Negro in Puerto Rico, have brought to light a number of sayings about the Negro common to university students. The saying, “God made the Negro so that the animal can rest," is an example." Williams noted that despite the notable decline in segregation in Puerto Rico following the enactment of the 1943 civil rights law, "colored people in Puerto Rico are very reluctant to visit certain hotels or night clubs," noting how segregation persisted in "first class nightclubs" and that these nightclubs were paying only light $25 fines which were "locally considered a joke." However, Williams attributed segregation in Puerto Rico at the time to "class, rather than race." He also noted how in recent time, even opponents of Muñoz Marín "agree that he and his party have given Negroes a square deal and opened positions to them, especially in the teaching profession and the higher ranks of the police force, from which they were conventionally debarred."

Revolutionary leaders, including Pedro Albizu Campos in the 1950s, fought to eliminate the "racial" discrimination heightened by U.S. imperialism and to place Afro–Puerto Ricans in political positions of power.

== Recent events ==
In 2019, José Pichy Torres Zamora, a Puerto Rican politician was taken to task for making a racist comment regarding the African-descended people of Loíza.

In June 2020, amid the worldwide protests against racism after the murder of George Floyd, people of the Municipality of Loíza joined in and Juan Dalmau Ramírez, a high-ranking member of the Puerto Rican Independence Party, put forth the need to educate Puerto Rico's children on human rights, and ending racism and xenophobia. The University of Puerto Rico held an online forum on racism and discrimination. During this time as well, a Black family in Canóvanas, filed a cease-and-desist complaint against an 82-year old woman neighbor for alleged Black racial slurs, playing loud music 24x7 directed at their new home, and harassing them with the posting of homemade drawings that included degrading comments about Black people. The woman received a citation from the police for playing loud music and was summoned to Court to answer to the other complaints. People also protested in front of the governor's mansion in San Juan.

In 2022, a flyer asking "do you want this BLACK man to be mayor of Guayama" circulated before elections.

== Legacy ==
=== Contemporary demographics ===
The current Puerto Rican population reflects the former immigration policy of 1815 spearheaded by the Spanish government in the 19th century, with hundreds of immigrants arriving from Corsica, France, Ireland, Scotland, Germany, Italy, and Portugal, as well as Arabs from Lebanon.

Until 1950 the U.S. Bureau of the Census attempted to quantify the racial composition of the island's population, while experimenting with various racial taxonomies. In 1960 the Census dropped the racial identification question for Puerto Rico but included it again in the year 2000 census. The only category that remained constant over time was white, even as other racial labels shifted greatly—from "colored" to "Black," "mulatto," and "other". Regardless of the precise terminology, the Census reported that the bulk of the Puerto Rican population was white from 1899 to 2000. In the 2000 U.S. census Puerto Ricans were asked to choose which racial category they self-identified with. The breakdown was follows: white (mostly Spanish origin) 80.5%, black 8%, Amerindian 0.4%, Asian 0.2%, mixed and other 10.9%.
