= Afro–Puerto Ricans =

Racial and ethnic minority in Puerto Rico

Afro–Puerto Ricans: Afropuertorriqueños
Afroboricuas · Afroborinqueños Afroborincanos · Afropuertorros; (Spanish)
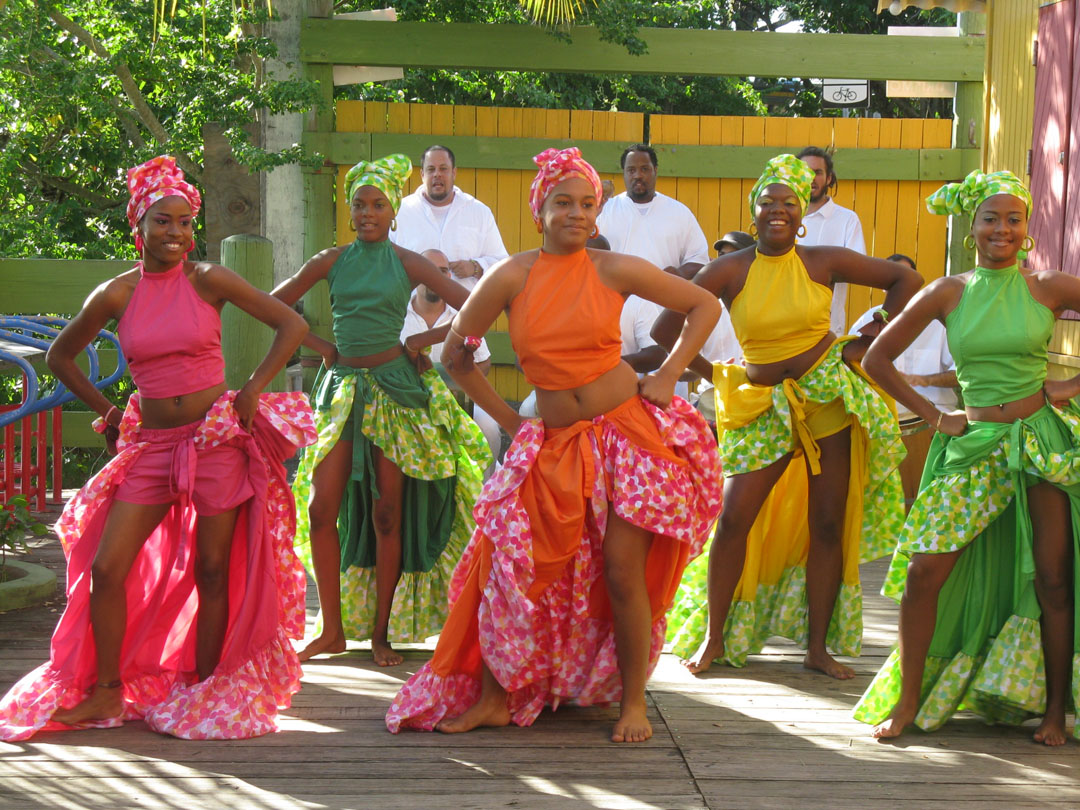
- Afro–Puerto Rican women in Bomba dance wear

Total population
- 228,711–1,000,000 (Includes Afro–Puerto Ricans living outside of Puerto Rico)

Regions with significant populations
- Puerto Rico (more heavily concentrated in coastal Northeast regions of the island)

Languages
- Spanish; Bozal; English; Lucumí; Habla Congo; Portuguese; French; Haitian Creole; Spanglish

Religion
- Predominantly Catholicism; Protestantism; Rastafari and other Afro-diasporic religion (mainly Santería)

Related ethnic groups
- Yoruba people, Arará, Fang people, Bubi people, Afro-Cubans, Afro-Dominicans, Afro-Haitians, Haitian Cuban other Afro-Latin American and Afro-Caribbean ethnic groups

Afro–Puerto Ricans (Spanish: Afropuertorriqueños), most commonly known as Afroboricuas, but also occasionally referred to as Afroborinqueños, Afroborincanos, (Note: The term Afroboricua is gender-neutral, whereas the terms Afropuertorriqueño, Afroborinqueño, Afroborincano, and Afropuertorro are male-specific when ending in «o» and female-specific when ending in «a».) or Afropuertorros, (Note: The term Puertorro -a is used popularly, spontaneously, and politely to refer to Puerto Ricans or Puerto Rico. It is occasionally mistaken for a pejorative, but the term is not considered offensive by Puerto Ricans. It has been most famously used by Puerto Rican musicians, including Bobby Valentín in his song Soy Boricua (1972), Andy Montañez in En Mi Puertorro (2006), and Bad Bunny in ACHO PR (2023).) are Puerto Ricans of full or partial sub-Saharan African origin, who are predominately the descendants of slaves, freedmen, and free Blacks original to West and Central Africa. The term Afro–Puerto Rican is also used to refer to historical or cultural elements in Puerto Rican society associated with this community, including music, language, cuisine, art, and religion.

The history of Afro–Puerto Ricans traces its origins to the arrival of free West African Black men, or libertos (freedmen), who accompanied Spanish Conquistador Juan Ponce de León at the start of the colonization of the island of Puerto Rico. Upon landing and settling, the Spaniards enslaved and exploited the Indigenous Taínos to work in the extraction of gold. When the Taíno forced laborers were exterminated primarily due to Old World infectious diseases, the Spanish Crown began to rely on sub-Saharan African slavery emanating from different ethnic groups within West and Central Africa to staff their mining, plantations, and constructions.

While there was slavery in Puerto Rico, the island received less Black slaves than other Spanish and non-Spanish colonies in the Americas. The need for direct enslaved labor brought through the Atlantic slave trade was greatly reduced by the depletion of gold in Puerto Rico in the 16th century, and the island began to serve primarily as a strategic and military outpost to support, protect, and defend trade routes of Spanish ships traveling between Spain and territories within the continental Americas. However, the Spanish, hoping to destabilize the neighboring colonies of competing world powers, encouraged enslaved fugitives and free people of color from other European colonies in the Caribbean to emigrate to Puerto Rico. As a result, significant numbers of Black people emigrted to Puerto Rico from neighboring British, Danish, Dutch, and French colonies in the Caribbean.

In the 19th century, slavery in Puerto Rico was increased, as the Spanish, facing economic decline with the loss of all of its colonial territories in the Americas aside from Cuba and Puerto Rico, established and expanded sugar cane production in the island. Since 1789, slaves in Puerto Rico were allowed to earn or buy their freedom. Throughout the years, there were several slave revolts in the island. Promised their freedom, slaves participated in the 1868 Grito de Lares revolt against Spanish rule. On March 22, 1873, slavery was officially abolished in Puerto Rico, amidst growing abolitionist movements that had grown to include prominent local figures. Freed slaves and their descendants were also widespread throughout Puerto Rico and included notable figures like Román Baldorioty de Castro, Ramón Emeterio Betances and José Celso Barbosa.

The contributions of Puerto Ricans of full or mostly sub-Saharan African descent to music, art, language, and heritage have been instrumental in shaping the culture of Puerto Rico.

== First Africans in Puerto Rico ==
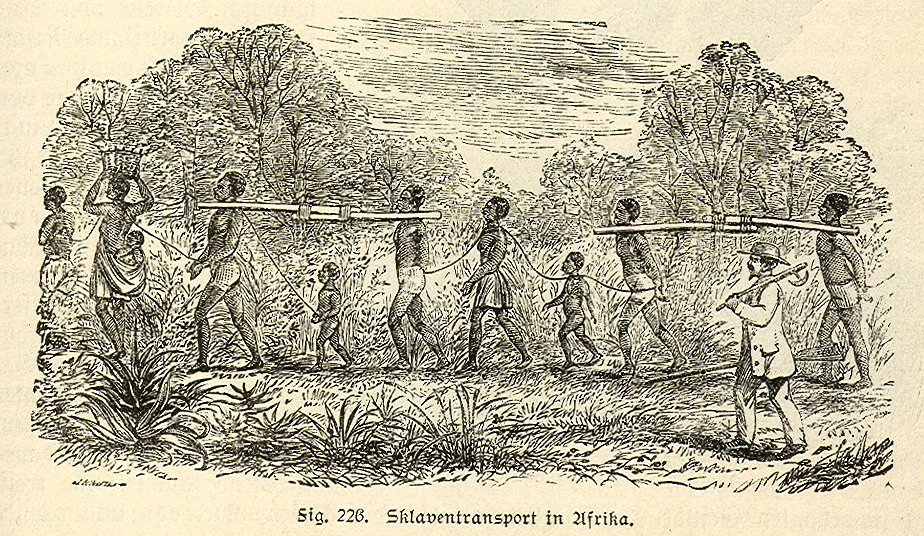
Slave transport in Africa, depicted in a 19th-century engraving

Since the beginning of the European colonization, free African also took residence in the Americas, despite their historic presence being less studied. When Ponce de León and the Spaniards arrived on the island of Borinquen (Puerto Rico), they were greeted by the Cacique Agüeybaná, the supreme leader of the peaceful Taíno tribes on the island. Agüeybaná helped to maintain the peace between the Taíno and the Spaniards. According to historian Ricardo Alegria, in 1509 Juan Garrido was the first free African man to set foot on the island; he was a conquistador who was part of Juan Ponce de León's entourage. Garrido was born on the West African coast, the son of an African king. In 1508, he joined Juan Ponce de León to explore Puerto Rico and prospect for gold. In 1511, he fought under Ponce de León to repress the Carib and the Taíno, who had joined forces in Puerto Rico in a great revolt against the Spaniards. Garrido next joined Hernán Cortés in the Spanish conquest of Mexico. Another free African man who accompanied de León was Pedro Mejías. Mejías married a Taíno woman chief (a cacica), by the name of Yuisa. Yuisa was baptized as Catholic so that she could marry Mejías. She was given the Christian name of Luisa (the town Loíza, Puerto Rico, was named for her). Francisco Piñon, who arrived in similar fashion, is believed by historian Sued Badillo to be the namesake of Piñones in Loíza.

Spanish Friar Bartolomé de las Casas, who had accompanied Ponce de León, was outraged at the treatment of the Taíno. In 1512 he protested at the council of Burgos at the Spanish Court. He fought for the freedom of the natives and was able to secure their rights. The Spanish colonists, fearing the loss of their labor force, also protested before the courts. They complained that they needed manpower to work in the mines, build forts, and supply labor for the thriving sugar cane plantations. As an alternative, Las Casas suggested the importation and use of African slaves. In 1517, the Spanish Crown permitted its subjects to import twelve slaves each, thereby beginning the African slave trade in their colonies. Free black women arrived from Spain and performed several jobs, mostly related to housekeeping. On August 4, 1526, Carlos V of Spain ordered the building of a brothel at San Juan where both white and black Spanish women were held along Taínas.

In 1527, the first major slave rebellion occurred in Puerto Rico, as dozen of slaves fought against the colonists in a brief revolt. The few slaves who escaped retreated to the forests and mountains, where they resided as maroons with surviving Taínos. During the following centuries, by 1873 slaves had carried out more than twenty revolts. Some were of great political importance, such as the Ponce and Vega Baja conspiracies.

By 1570, the colonists found that the gold mines were depleted. After gold mining ended on the island, the Spanish Crown bypassed Puerto Rico by moving the western shipping routes to the north. The island became primarily a garrison for those ships that would pass on their way to or from richer colonies. The cultivation of crops such as tobacco, cotton, cocoa, and ginger became the cornerstone of the economy. With the scale of Puerto Rico's economy reduced, colonial families tended to farm these crops themselves, and the demand for slaves was reduced.

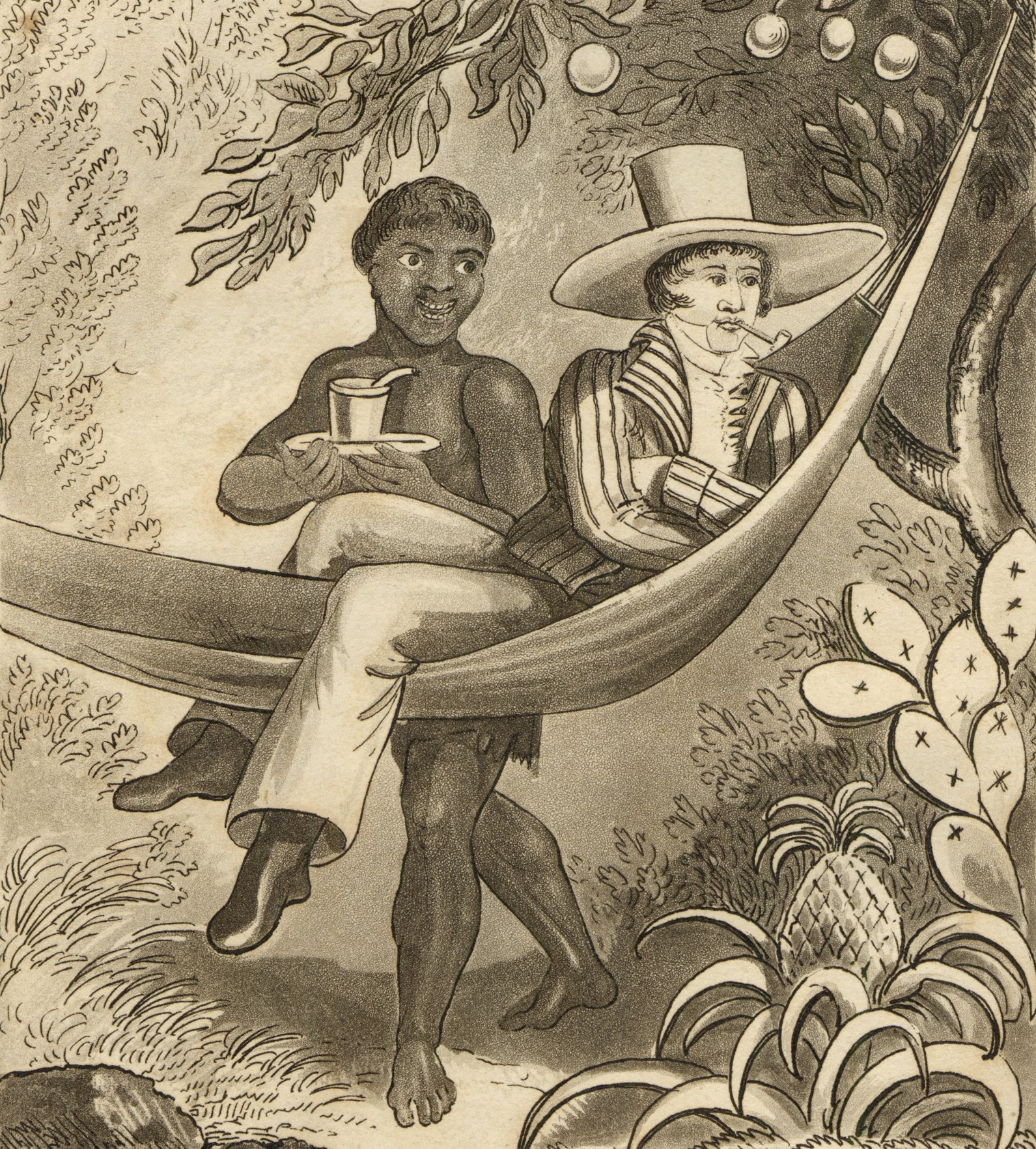
Spanish Planter of Puerto Rico with House Slave, ca.1808

With rising demand for sugar on the international market, major planters increased their cultivation and processing of sugar cane, which was labor-intensive. Sugar plantations supplanted mining as Puerto Rico's main industry and kept demand high for African slavery. Spain promoted sugar cane development by granting loans and tax exemptions to the owners of the plantations. They were also given permits to participate in the African slave trade. By the 1600s, Taínos had been removed from the census, which only classified Spaniards and free blacks. During his administration, governor Juan Pérez de Guzmán released a group of slaves that escaped from St. Croix and provided housing and food for them. In 2007, historian David Stark claimed that this began a policy where slaves from foreign lands were granted asylum and freedom. The Council of the Indies allowed easy residence to these individuals, who were only asked to become Catholic and swear allegiance to the Crown. The received terrains to settle at Puerta de Tierra in San Juan. Several Royal Decrees promoted this practice throughout the following centuries.

In Puerto Rico, slaves were allowed to buy their freedom by paying the price that was assigned to them, either at once or in installments as agreed with their owners, with included working in their free days or asking for loans to collect the amount. However, they would regularly continue to work to free their families. These were time consuming and most slaves would rather flee into the jungle, becoming cimarrones. These would be labelled as fugitives, and the practice extended for centuries. Owners also freed slaves for a number of reasons, economic or personal, and the liberation of slaves in testaments became common in Puerto Rico. Some would be named beneficiaries in these documents. Some would use the money granted to them to purchase terrains, while other became slave owners themselves as was the case of a woman named Juana María. Occasionally, owners would free slaves that denounced uprising attempts. Third parties would also purchase slaves for the sole purpose of freeing them.

Provided ways by which slaves could obtain freedom:

- A slave could be freed by his master in a church or outside it, before a judge, by testament or letter.
- A slave could be freed against his master's will by denouncing a forced rape, by denouncing a counterfeiter, by discovering disloyalty against the king, and by denouncing murder against his master.
- Any slave who received part of his master's estate in his master's will was automatically freed (these bequests were sometimes made to the master's mixed-race slave children, as well as to other slaves for service.)
- If a slave was made a guardian to his master's children, he was freed.
- If slave parents in Hispanic America had ten children, the whole family was freed.

As the different races began mingling, the classification of pardos and mulattos were created (frequently used interchangeably), to refer to mixed race black descendants and blacks, as part of the caste system. The black population was not only classified by their parentage, but also their status as a slave and or the manner in which they acquired their liberty. The local population of free mulatos was becoming influential within Puerto Rican society. Among these was Miguel Enríquez, considered one of the most successful privateers in service of the Spanish Crown, and José Campeche, considered the most distinguished Puerto Rican artist of the Spanish era and sculptor Felipe Espada.

== Royal Decree of Graces of 1789 ==
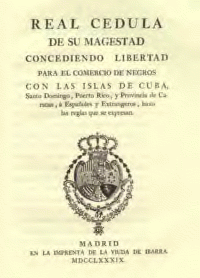
The Royal Decree of Graces of 1789 which set the rules pertaining to the Slaves in Puerto Rico and the Caribbean

The native-born Puerto Ricans (criollos) who wanted to serve in the regular Spanish army petitioned the Spanish Crown for that right. In 1741, the Spanish government established the Regimiento Fijo de Puerto Rico. Many of the former slaves, now freedmen, joined either the Fijo or the local civil militia. Puerto Ricans of African descent played an instrumental role in the defeat of an invasion of Puerto Rico in 1797 by British forces under Sir Ralph Abercromby. As the mixing of races increased, so did the population of free blacks during the first three centuries of European presence, outnumbering the whites. In general, the formal recording of their contributions, as with women, was limited due to sociocultural elements. Relevant documents have been preserved in the political, religious and academic archives. By the first half of the 19th Century, free slaves outnumbered both whites and black slaves in general. Consequently, Miguel de Muesas proposed the establishment of a town for them, leading to the foundation of the agrarian community of San Mateo de Cangrejos.

The measures proposed by Charles III of Spain to increase the population of Puerto Rico led to Spanish military men arriving in the island and marrying black or mixed race women, resulting in a boom in the free population. This resulted in confrontation between the higher military and the Church, with the first feeling that blacks were inferior. After Alejandro O'Reilly's visit, the population of white and free blacks continued growing exponentially. This functionary noted an homogenous racial composition of 44,883 registered persons, and more racial tolerance than in Europe or other colonies. Free women outnumbered the men, complemented by slave men outnumbering women by more than twice, with free children outnumbering both groups.

In 1776, Fray Iñigo Abbad y Lassiera notes that it was common to see free individuals among the blacks born in Puerto Rico. While white men outnumbered the mixed race men, women from the second group outnumbered the European and as consequence, their children were also more numerous. Free blacks numbered 2,803 registered individuals. Towards the end of the 18th Century, some free blacks lived in the properties belonging to others, keeping the grounds that were used for agriculture. The need to provide lands for black families became evident and most settled in empty terrains.

== 19th century ==
=== Royal Decree of Graces of 1815 ===
"Puerto Rican population in thousands according to Spanish Royal Census"
Year	White	Mixed	Free Blacks	Slaves
1827	163	100	27	34
1834	189	101	25	42
1845	216	176	--	51

The Royal Decree of Graces of 1815 was intended to encourage Spaniards and later other Europeans to settle and populate the colonies of Cuba and Puerto Rico. The decree encouraged the use of slave labor to revive agriculture and attract new settlers. The new agricultural class immigrating from other countries of Europe used slave labor in large numbers, and harsh treatment was frequent. The slaves resisted—from the early 1820s until 1868, a series of slave uprisings occurred on the island; the last was known as the Grito de Lares.

The Royal Degree also allowed free blacks access to more terrains and even to possess their own slaves. However, they received half of what was granted to whites. Consequently, freed slaves and mulatto/pardo descendants had a significant presence among the working classes, in particular the coffee and sugar industries. Some bought, inherited or received terrains, which were mostly used for farming and were passed to their children. Other types of properties including businesses and animals were also owned. The censuses carried between the 18th and 19th centuries had difficulties differentiating between the terms pardo, mulatto, moreno and black, with some individuals being classified under more than one of these classifications. Eventually, a system based on castes and economic classes was adopted where most were classified as "jornaleros".

Free blacks worked side by side with slaves in the haciendas (in agricultural and housekeeping tasks). The work was tough and the pay was measly and this (along being forced into undignified work) led to them often leaving. Hacendados, however, used debt and other measures to kept them employed until the matter was legally settled. Agregados, members of the working class that had no proper terrains and lived with their employers, counted free blacks among them. Other tasks such as craftsmanship and wood working were also common among them and led to the creation of guilds. In rare cases, such as the descendants of the Miguel Michel Godreau and María Mónica marriage, who reached the status of hacendados. Despite their freedom, most freed blacks rarely escaped poverty.

In July 1821, for instance, the slave Marcos Xiorro planned and conspired to lead a slave revolt against the sugar plantation owners and the Spanish Colonial government. Although the conspiracy was suppressed, Xiorro achieved legendary status among the slaves, and is part of Puerto Rico's heroic folklore. During the governorship of Miguel de la Torre, Pedro Tomás de Córdova noted a pronounced growth in the population, including the amount of free blacks. They, along other mixed-race individuals, continued to work in specialized military units in some municipalities and the military enclave of San Juan. However, fearful of a slave rebellion supported by Haitian interests, De la Torre banned these.

By 1828, the free population was estimated at 238,084 of which the percentage by race was not clear, tough it is known that the white population outnumbered the other groups. The black population was abundant in the east and north east. At no point during the 19th Century slaves represented more than 9% of a municipality's population. Some free blacks requested terrains, such as a group that wanted to settle at Cedro in Ponce. Meanwhile, they remained the majority in the San Mateo de Cangrejos community with 609 individuals (79.9%).

During his stay in Puerto Rico, Jorge D. Flinter wrote two books (including A view of the present condition of the slave population in the island of Puerto Rico under the Spanish government) in which he estimated the population trends between 1820 and 1830, in which whites (102,432-162,311) were outnumbered by free mulattos (212,920-254,574) and the slave population remained a minority (21,730-34,240). In 1832, Flinter documented the predominance of free blacks within the farms. The 1834 Royal Census of Puerto Rico established that 11% of the population were slaves, 35% were colored freemen (also known as free people of color in French colonies, meaning free mixed-race/black people), and 54% were white.

Pedro Tomás de Córdova compiled several population estimates in his Memorias. These depicted the city of San Juan with a predominantly white population (4,147; 36.1%) followed by free blacks (3,171; 28.1%), white military (2,291; 19.9%) and a still abundant population of slaves (1,875; 16.3%) in 1828. Of these, 1,502 were men and 1,178 were women. When weighing the white and free black populations, this pattern was repeated in places such as Añasco (5,004; 50.7%), San Germán (28,292; 52%), Utuado (1,824; 42.3%), El Pepino (6,702; 70.8%), Mayagüez (7,758; 42.4%), Rincón (2,558; 56%), Cabo Rojo (4,201; 41%), Moca (3,607; 61%), Fajardo (1,671; 40.6%), Cayey (1,968; 54%), Caguas (3,252; 36.7%), Vega Baja (1,337; 51.3%), Aguadilla (5,483; 65.6%), Aguada (4,938; 78.9%), Arecibo (4,862; 48%), Yabucoa (1,608; 35.6%), Naguabo (1,468; 47.7%), Corozal (720; 36.2%), Luquillo (1,397; 59.6%), Juana Díaz (2,933; 63.9%), Las Piedras (1,994; 54.8%), Barranquitas (2,558; 74%), Camuy (1,680; 65.9%), Quebradillas (1,303; 30.7%), Cidra (1,648; 61.7%), Adjuntas (615; 53%), Isabela (2,310; 39.7%), Aibonito (650; 36%), Hatillo (1,493; 52%) and Trujillo Bajo (3,411; 41.4%). Other areas, however, were more heavily populated by free blacks such as Coamo (60%), Trujillo Bajo (982; 57.8%), Río Piedras (1,486; 51%), Guaynabo (50.9%), Loíza (44.9%), Guayama (2,705; 34.2%), Ponce (5,910; 39.6%), Yauco (7,487; 67.9%), Vega Alta (645; 32.6%), Peñuelas (4,995; 76.8%), Humacao (2,045; 43.3%), Juncos (1,808; 55.4%), Maunabo (655; 44%), Trujillo Alto (1,241; 41%) and Patillas (1,979; 48.6%), in which the white population was a distinct minority. However, the inclusion of a multi-racial and undefined category of "aggregates" could shift the balance in several areas.

In 1836, the names and descriptions of slaves who had escaped, and details of their ownership were reported in the Gaceta de Puerto Rico. If an African presumed to be a slave was captured and arrested, the information was published. In the 1846 census of the Comisión de Estadísticas, whites were estimated to be 48.8% (≈216,083), morenos and free pardos 39.8% (≈175,791) and slaves 11.6% (≈51,265).

Social dynamics continued to evolve during this century and the most prominent educational institution in Puerto Rico at the time, the Seminario Conciliar at San Juan, accepted free blacks and their descendants as well as Europeans. Several free black families gained prominence, including the Cordero family, who were responsible for the education of a large portion of the San Juan population. At Guayama, poet and playwright Eleuterio Derkes also gained notoriety as a teacher. In literature, Sotero Figueroa, Manuel Alonso Pizarro and Carlos Casanova Duperoy gained notoriety. Within music, Felipe Gutiérrez Espinosa gained notoriety by becoming the first Caribbean-born composer to write an opera. Juan Inés Ramos and a number of his descendants became well known musicians.

With the establishment of the Libreta system, most of the free blacks served within it as jornaleros. Planters became nervous because of the large number of slaves; they ordered restrictions, particularly on their movements outside a plantation. Rose Clemente, a 21st-century black Puerto Rican columnist, wrote: "Until 1846, Blacks on the island had to carry a notebook (Libreta system) to move around the island, like the passbook system in apartheid South Africa." By 1866, the white population had become a majority at 52.7% (≈188,869) followed by free blacks at 35.2% (≈126,399) and slaves at 11.7% (≈41,818) .

After the successful slave rebellion against the French in Saint-Domingue (Haiti) in 1803, establishing a new republic, the Spanish Crown became fearful that the "Criollos" (native born) of Puerto Rico and Cuba, her last two remaining possessions, might follow suit. The Spanish government issued the Royal Decree of Graces of 1815 to attract European immigrants from non-Spanish countries to populate the island, believing that these new immigrants would be more loyal to Spain than the mixed-race Criollos. However, they did not expect the new immigrants to racially intermarry, as they did, and to identify completely with their new homeland. By 1850, most of the former Spanish possessions in the Americans had achieved independence.

On May 31, 1848, the Governor of Puerto Rico Juan Prim, in fear of an independence or slavery revolt, imposed draconian laws, "El Bando contra La Raza Africana", to control the behavior of all Black Puerto Ricans, free or slave. However, Juan de la Pezuela replaced Prim that same year and facilitated the freedom of slaves by religious means, lowering the price to pay for slave baptism to 25 pesos macuquinos.

In 1855, a colera epidemic that began at Spain reached Puerto Rico despite the measures taken by the local authorities. The poor population was the most affected, with free blacks (63.2%) and slaves (35%) suffering the most casualties in the region of Ponce. This pattern was repeated in the municipalities of Arecibo, San Germán, Aibonito, Mayagüez and Morovis and combined with Ponce, free blacks (2,875 men, 1,475 women) and slaves (1,298 men, 709 women) outnumbered the deaths among whites (694 men, 307 women). In December 1860, a census was carried out by Royal Decree, covering Puerto Rico and Vieques. In it, free blacks and people of mixed race were 42.4% of the population, behind whites (51.5%) but outnumbering slaves (7.2%). Free blacks were the only group where women outnumbered men. By this time, free blacks represented a third of all property owners.

On September 23, 1868, slaves, who had been promised freedom, participated in the short failed revolt against Spain which became known as "El Grito de Lares" or "The Cry of Lares". Many of the participants were imprisoned or executed. Free blacks who had grown to resent the Libreta system, burned their assigned notebooks during the revolt.

During this period, Puerto Rico provided a means for people to leave some of the racial restrictions behind: under such laws as Regla del Sacar or Gracias al Sacar, a person of African ancestry could be considered legally white if able to prove they also had ancestors with at least one person per generation in the last four generations who had been legally white. Therefore, people of black ancestry with known white lineage became classified as white. This was the opposite of the later "one-drop rule" of hypodescent in the United States, whereby persons of any known African ancestry were classified as black.

By the second half of the century, free blacks outnumbered whites in barrios like Santa Bárbara and had taken over others like Cangrejos, also being more abundant in municipalities like Trujillo Alto, Guayama and Río Grande. The ethnic divide in the Fajardo was balanced to begin the century, a pattern seen in Luquillo during the second half. By 1868, Loíza presented a peculiar case, where free blacks outnumbered whites but were in turn outnumbered by black slaves, several of which were owned by the former group. San Mateo de Cangrejos was the first of its kind, being born from a decree allowing slaves from neighboring islands to become free in exchange for becoming Catholic, growing from this population which even came to have military affiliation.

=== Abolitionists ===
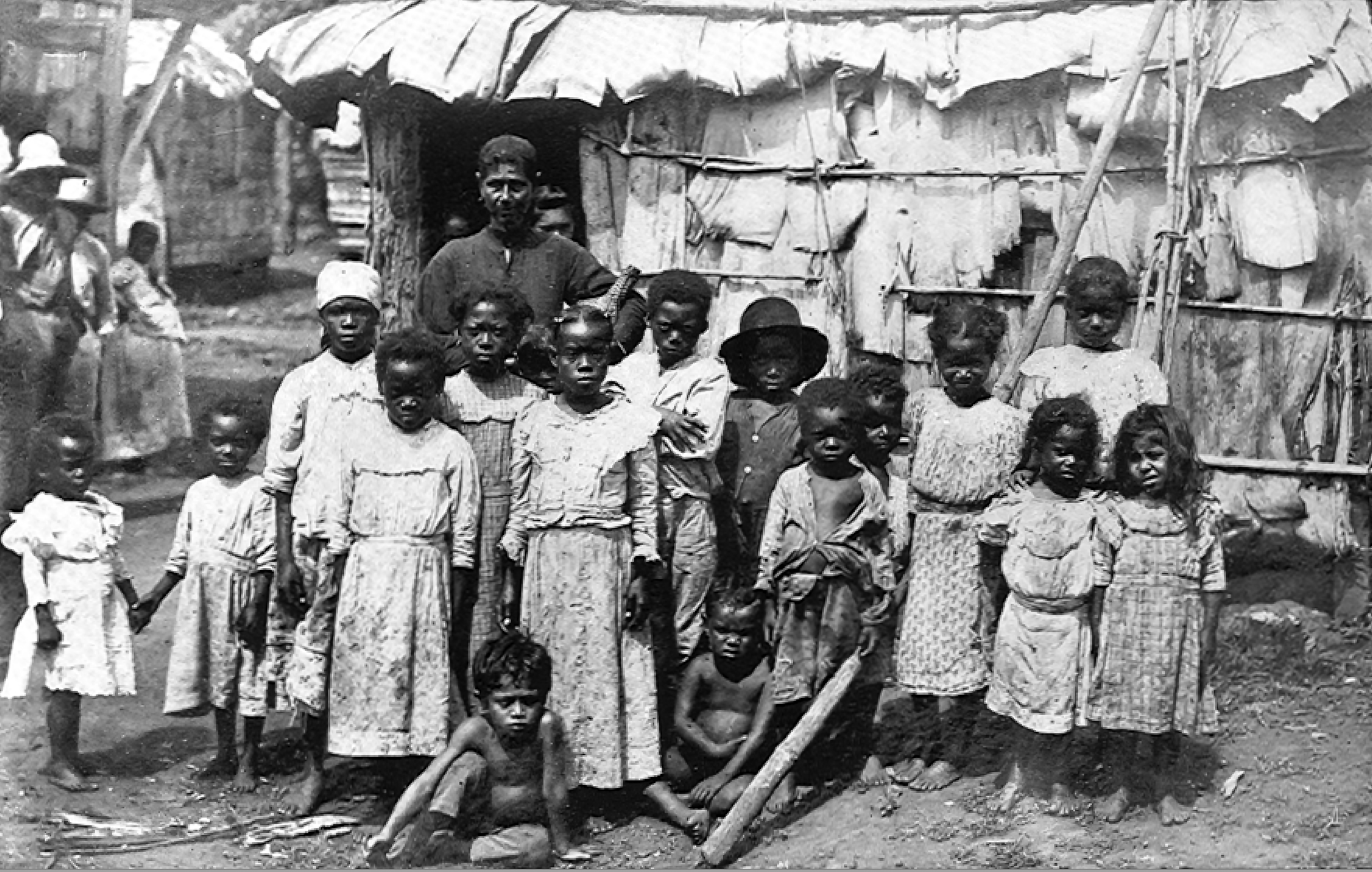
Peones in Puerto Rico, 1898

During the mid-19th century, a committee of abolitionists was formed in Puerto Rico that included many prominent Puerto Ricans. Dr. Ramón Emeterio Betances (1827-1898), whose mixed-race parents were wealthy landowners, believed in abolitionism, and together with fellow Puerto Rican abolitionist Segundo Ruiz Belvis (1829-1867), founded a clandestine organization called "The Secret Abolitionist Society". The group also included José Basora and Salvador Brau. The objective of the society was to free slave children by paying for freedom when they were baptized. The event, which was also known as "aguas de libertad" (waters of liberty), was carried out at the Nuestra Señora de la Candelaria Cathedral in Mayagüez. When the child was baptized, Betances would give money to the parents, which they used to buy the child's freedom from the master.

José Julián Acosta (1827-1891) was a member of a Puerto Rican commission, which included Ramón Emeterio Betances, Segundo Ruiz Belvis, and Francisco Mariano Quiñones (1830-1908). The commission participated in the "Overseas Information Committee" which met in Madrid, Spain. There, Acosta presented the argument for the abolition of slavery in Puerto Rico. On November 19, 1872, Román Baldorioty de Castro (1822-1889, a free mulatto himself), together with Luis Padial (1832-1879), Julio Vizcarrondo (1830-1889) and the Spanish Minister of Overseas Affairs, Segismundo Moret (1833-1913), presented a proposal for the abolition of slavery.

On March 22, 1873, the Spanish government approved what became known as the Moret Law, which provided for gradual abolition. This edict granted freedom to slaves over 60 years of age, those belonging to the state, and children born to slaves after September 17, 1868.

The Moret Law established the Central Slave Registrar. In 1872 it began gathering the following data on the island's slave population: name, country of origin, present residence, names of parents, sex, marital status, trade, age, physical description, and master's name. This has been an invaluable resource for historians and genealogists.

=== Abolition of slavery ===
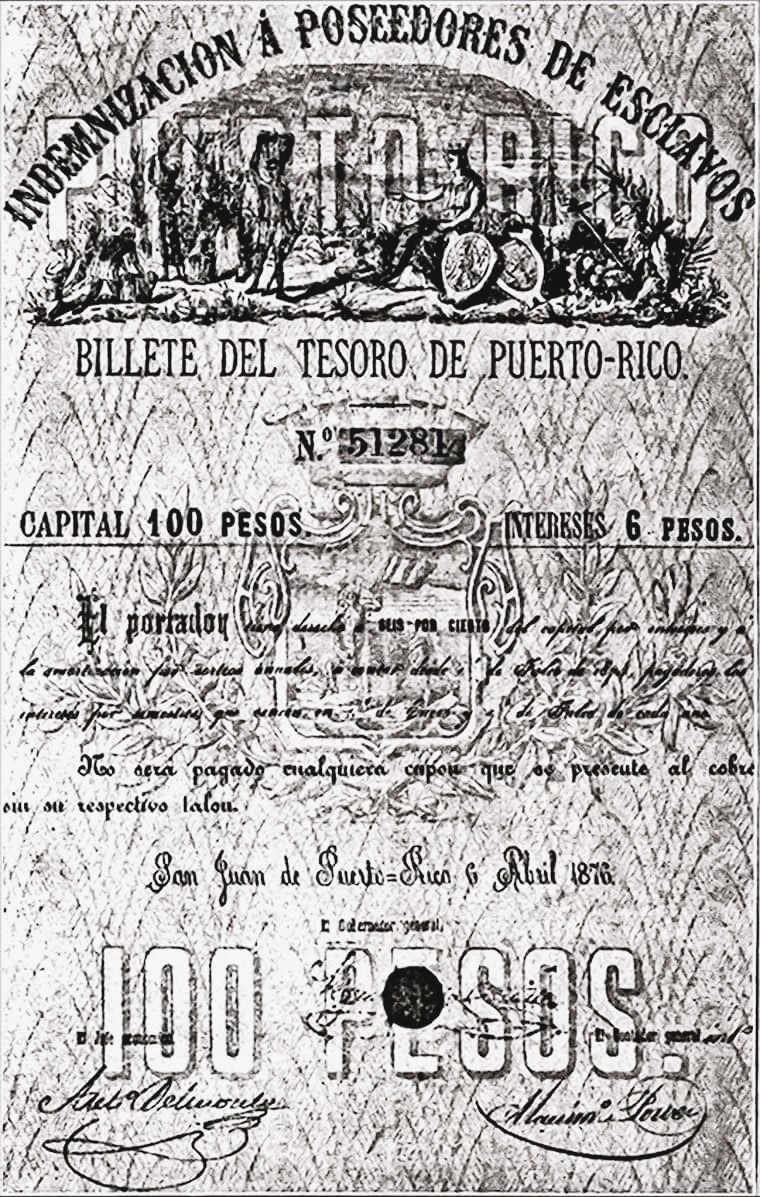
Indemnity bond paid as compensation to former owners of freed slaves

The Moret Law led to all children born to slaves after September 17, 1868, to be automatically freed in exchange for a compensation. Unregistered slaves and those older than 60 years of age where also freed. On November 16, 1872, this law was extended to the Spanish colonies, due to the initiative of Pedro Cisa Cisa. On March 22, 1873, slavery was abolished in Puerto Rico, but with one significant caveat. The slaves were not emancipated; they had to buy their own freedom, at whatever price was set by their last masters. The law required that the former slaves work for another three years for their former masters, other people interested in their services, or for the state in order to pay some compensation. The remaining slaves at the time of enactment, were estimated around 5% of the population (≈30,000), outnumbered by the quantity of free blacks and their descendants.

The former slaves earned money in a variety of ways: some by trades, for instance as shoemakers, or laundering clothes, or by selling the produce they were allowed to grow, in the small patches of land allotted to them by their former masters. In a sense, they resembled the black sharecroppers of the southern United States after the American Civil War, but the latter did not own their land. They simply farmed another's land, for a share of the crops raised. The government created the Protector's Office which was in charge of overseeing the transition. The Protector's Office was to pay any difference owed to the former master once the initial contract expired.

The majority of the freed slaves continued to work for their former masters, but as free people, receiving wages for their labor. If the former slave decided not to work for his former master, the Protectors Office would pay the former master 23% of the former slave's estimated value, as a form of compensation.

The freed slaves became integrated into Puerto Rico's society. Racism has existed in Puerto Rico, but it is not considered to be as severe as other places in the New World, possibly because of the following factors:

- In the 8th century, nearly all of Spain was conquered (711-718), by the Arab-Berber/African Moors who had crossed over from North Africa. The first African slaves were brought to Spain during Arab domination by North African merchants. By the middle of the 13th century, Christians had reconquered the Iberian peninsula. A section of Seville, which once was a Moorish stronghold, was inhabited by thousands of Africans. Africans became freemen after converting to Christianity, and they lived integrated in Spanish society. African women were highly sought after by Spanish males. Spain's exposure to people of color over the centuries accounted for the positive racial attitudes that prevailed in the New World. Historian Robert Martínez thought it was unsurprising that the first conquistadors intermarried with the native Taíno and later with the African immigrants.
- The Catholic Church played an instrumental role in preserving the human dignity and working for the social integration of the African man in Puerto Rico. The church insisted that every slave be baptized and converted to the Catholic faith. Church doctrine held that master and slave were equal before the eyes of God, and therefore brothers in Christ with a common moral and religious character. Cruel and unusual punishment of slaves was considered a violation of the fifth commandment.
- When the gold mines were declared depleted in 1570 and mining came to an end in Puerto Rico, the majority of the white Spanish settlers left the island to seek their fortunes in the richer colonies such as Mexico; the island became a Spanish garrison. The majority of those who stayed behind were either African or mulattoes (of mixed race). By the time Spain reestablished commercial ties with Puerto Rico, the island had a large multiracial population. After the Spanish Crown issued the Royal Decree of Graces of 1815, it attracted many European immigrants, in effect "whitening" the island into the 1850s. But, the new arrivals also intermarried with native islanders, and added to the multiracial population. They also identified with the island, rather than simply with the rulers.

Two Puerto Rican writers have written about racism; Abelardo Díaz Alfaro (1916-1999) and Luis Palés Matos (1898-1959), who was credited with creating the poetry genre known as Afro-Antillano.

== Spanish-American War ==
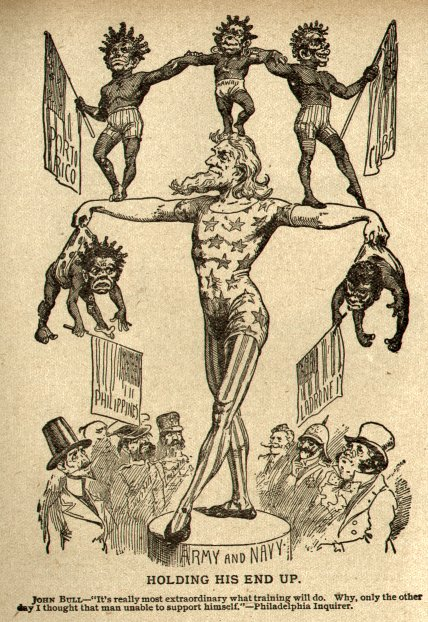
In an 1899 newspaper cartoon, the people of Puerto Rico, as well as the people of the new possessions of the United States, were depicted as black savage children

The Treaty of Paris of 1898 settled the Spanish-American War, which ended the centuries-long Spanish control over Puerto Rico. Like with other former Spanish territories, it now belonged to the United States. With the United States control over the island's institutions also came a reduction of the natives' political participation. In effect, the U.S. military government defeated the success of decades of negotiations for political autonomy between Puerto Rico's political class and Madrid's colonial administration. Puerto Ricans of African descent, aware of the opportunities and difficulties for blacks in the United States, responded in various ways. The racial bigotry of the Jim Crow Laws stood in contrast to the African-American expansion of mobility that the Harlem Renaissance illustrated.

One Puerto Rican politician of African descent who distinguished himself during this period was the physician and politician José Celso Barbosa (1857-1921). On July 4, 1899, he founded the pro-statehood Puerto Rican Republican Party and became known as the "Father of the Statehood for Puerto Rico" movement. Another distinguished Puerto Rican of African descent, who advocated Puerto Rico's independence, was Arturo Alfonso Schomburg (1874-1938). After emigrating to New York City in the United States, he amassed an extensive collection in preserving manuscripts and other materials of black Americans and the African diaspora. He is considered by some to be the "Father of Black History" in the United States, and a major study center and collection of the New York Public Library is named for him, the Schomburg Center for Research in Black Culture. He coined the term Afroborincano, meaning African-Puerto Rican.

== Discrimination ==
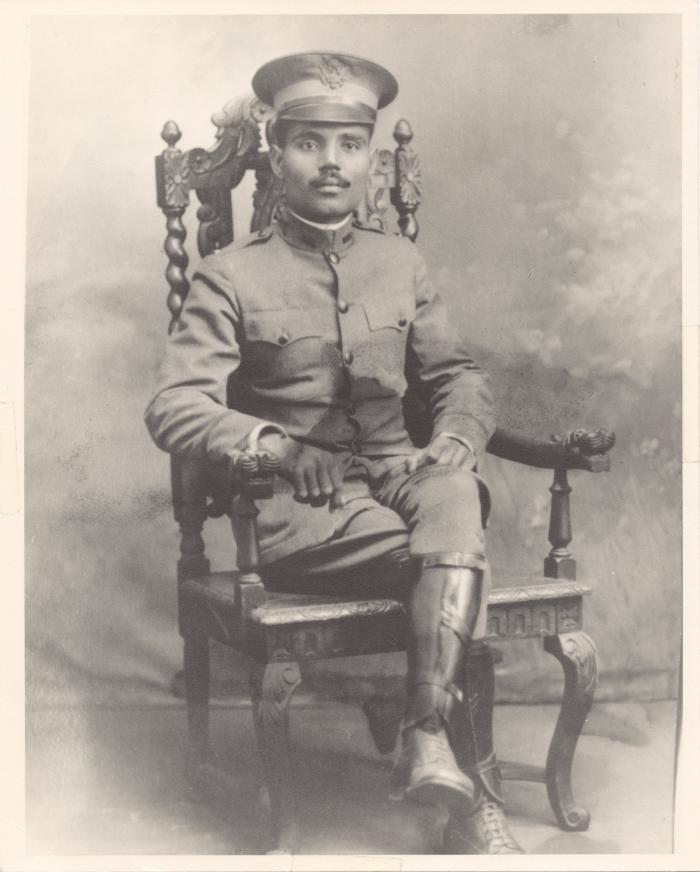
Lieutenant Pedro Albizu Campos (U.S. Army)

After the United States Congress approved the Jones Act of 1917, Puerto Ricans were granted US citizenship. As citizens Puerto Ricans were eligible for the military draft, and many were drafted into the armed forces of the United States during World War I. The armed forces were segregated until after World War II. Puerto Ricans of African descent were subject to the discrimination which was rampant in the military and the U.S.

Black Puerto Ricans residing in the mainland United States were assigned to all-black units. Rafael Hernández (1892-1965) and his brother Jesus, along with 16 more Puerto Ricans, were recruited by Jazz bandleader James Reese Europe to join the United States Army's Orchestra Europe. They were assigned to the 369th Infantry Regiment, an African-American regiment; it gained fame during World War I and was nicknamed "The Harlem Hell Fighters" by the Germans.

The United States also segregated military units in Puerto Rico. Pedro Albizu Campos (1891-1965), who later became the leader of the Puerto Rican Nationalist Party, held the rank of lieutenant. He founded the "Home Guard" unit of Ponce and was later assigned to the 375th Infantry Regiment, an all-black Puerto Rican regiment, which was stationed in Puerto Rico and never saw combat. Albizu Campos later said that the discrimination which he witnessed in the Armed Forces, influenced the development of his political beliefs.

Puerto Ricans of African descent were discriminated against in sports. Puerto Ricans who were dark-skinned and wanted to play Major League Baseball in the United States, were not allowed to do so. In 1892 organized baseball had codified a color line, barring African-American players, and any player who was dark-skinned, from any country. Ethnic African-Puerto Ricans continued to play baseball. In 1928, Emilio "Millito" Navarro traveled to New York City and became the first Puerto Rican to play baseball in the Negro leagues when he joined the Cuban Stars. He was later followed by others such as Francisco Coimbre, who also played for the Cuban Stars.

The persistence of these men paved the way for the likes of Baseball Hall of Famers Roberto Clemente and Orlando Cepeda, who played in the Major Leagues after the colorline was broken by Jackie Robinson of the Brooklyn Dodgers in 1947; they were inducted into the Baseball Hall of Fame for their achievements. Cepeda's father Pedro Cepeda, was denied a shot at the major leagues because of his color. Pedro Cepeda was one of the greatest players of his generation, the dominant hitter in the Professional Baseball League of Puerto Rico after its founding in 1938. He refused to play in the Negro leagues due to his abhorrence of the racism endemic to the segregated United States.

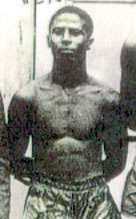
Juan Evangelista Venegas

Black Puerto Ricans also participated in other sports as international contestants. In 1917, Nero Chen became the first Puerto Rican boxer to gain international recognition when he fought against (Panama) Joe Gan at the "Palace Casino" in New York. In the 1948 Summer Olympics (the XIV Olympics), celebrated in London, boxer Juan Evangelista Venegas made sports history by becoming Puerto Rico's first Olympic medal winner when he beat Belgium's representative, Callenboat, on points for a unanimous decision. He won the bronze medal in boxing in the Bantamweight division. The event was also historic because it was the first time that Puerto Rico had participated as a nation in an international sporting event. It was common for impoverished Puerto Ricans to use boxing as a way to earn an income.

On March 30, 1965, José "Chegui" Torres defeated Willie Pastrano by technical knockout and won the World Boxing Council and World Boxing Association light heavyweight championships. He became the third Puerto Rican and the first one of African descent to win a professional world championship.

Among those who exposed the racism and discrimination in the US which Puerto Ricans, especially Black Puerto Ricans, were subject to, was Jesús Colón. Colón is considered by many as the "Father of the Nuyorican movement". He recounted his experiences in New York as a Black Puerto Rican in his book Lo que el pueblo me dice--: crónicas de la colonia puertorriqueña en Nueva York (What the people tell me---: Chronicles of the Puerto Rican colony in New York).

Critics of discrimination say that a majority of Puerto Ricans are racially mixed, but that they do not feel the need to identify as such. They argue that Puerto Ricans tend to assume that they are of Black African, American Indian, and European ancestry and only identify themselves as "mixed" only if they have parents who appear to be of distinctly different "races". Puerto Rico underwent a "whitening" process while under U.S. rule. There was a dramatic change in the numbers of people who were classified as "black" and "white" Puerto Ricans in the 1920 census, as compared to that in 1910. The numbers classified as "Black" declined sharply from one census to another (within 10 years' time). Historians suggest that more Puerto Ricans classified others as white because it was advantageous to do so at that time. In those years, census takers were generally the ones to enter the racial classification. Due to the power of Southern white Democrats, the US Census dropped the category of mulatto or mixed race in the 1930 census, enforcing the artificial binary classification of black and white. Census respondents were not allowed to choose their own classifications until the late 20th and early 21st centuries. It may have been that it was popularly thought it would be easier to advance economically and socially with the US if one were "white".

== African influence in Puerto Rican culture ==
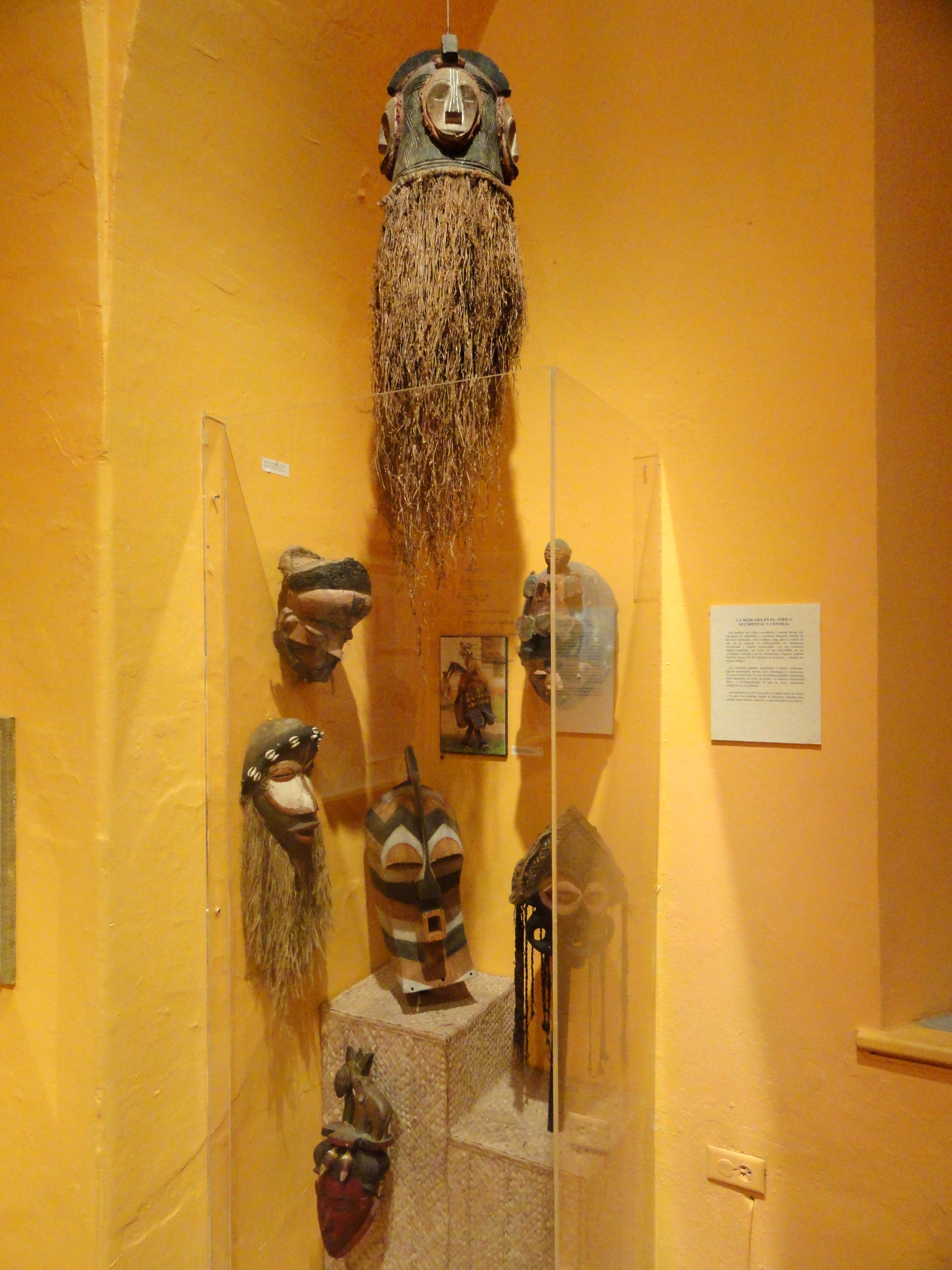
Masks in the African collection of the Museo de las Americas in San Juan, Puerto Rico

The descendants of the former slaves became instrumental in the development of Puerto Rico's political, economic and cultural structure. They overcame many obstacles and have contributed to the island's entertainment, sports, literature and scientific institutions. Their contributions and heritage can still be felt today in Puerto Rico's art, music, cuisine, and religious beliefs in everyday life. In Puerto Rico, March 22 is known as "Abolition Day" and it is a holiday celebrated by those who live in the island. The Spanish's limited focus on assimilating the black population, and maroon communities established from slave plantations, contributed to the majority African influence in black Puerto Rican culture. High amounts of interracial marriage and reproducing, since the 1500s, is the reason why the majority of Puerto Ricans are mixed-race European, African, Taino, but only a small number are of predominant or full African ancestry.

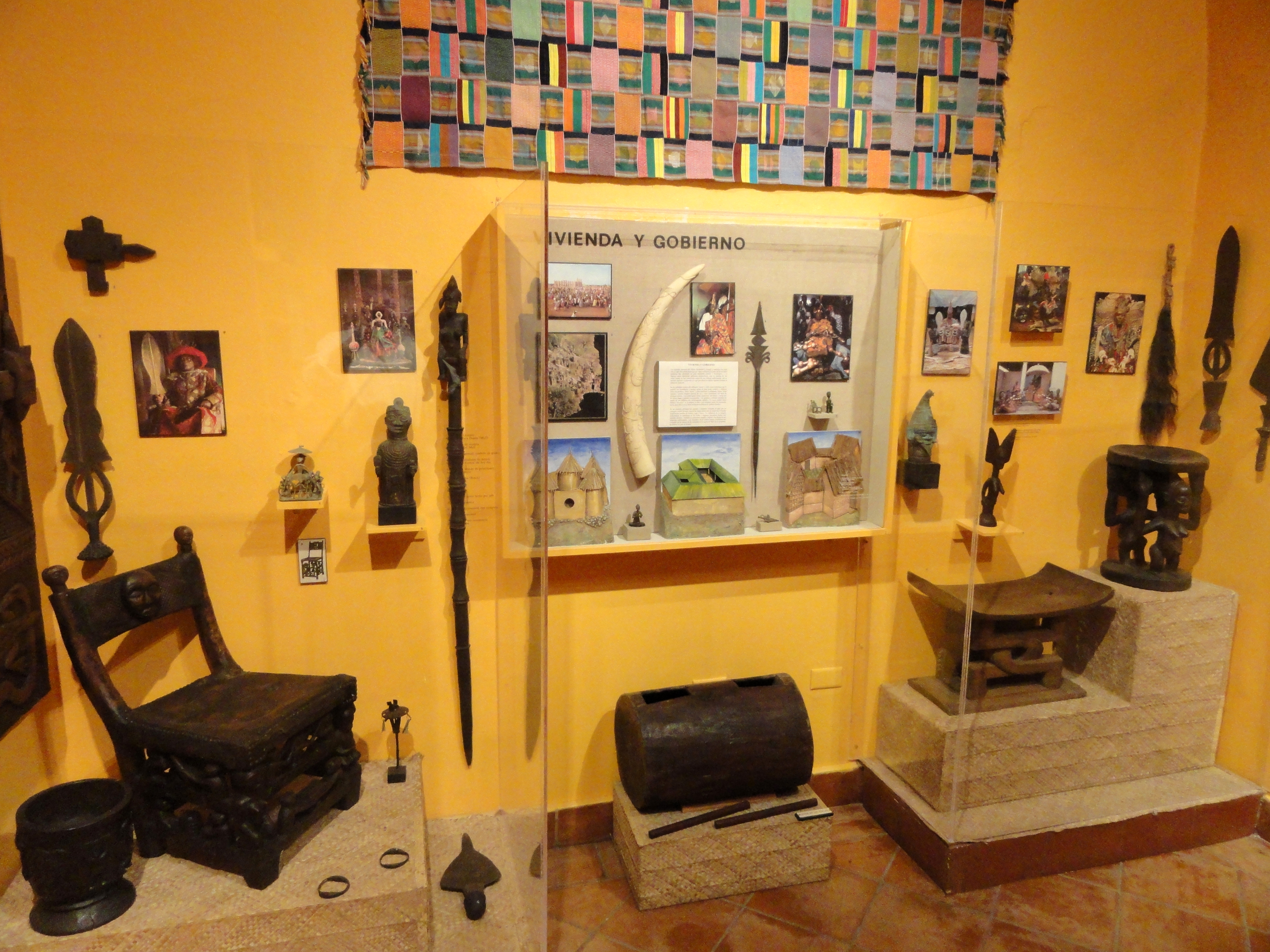
African Collection at the Museo de las Americas in San Juan, Puerto Rico

The first black people in the island came alongside European colonists as workers from Spain and Portugal known as Ladinos. During the 1500s, the slaves that Spain imported to Puerto Rico and most of its other colonies, were mainly from the Upper Guinea region. However, in the 1600s and 1700s, Spain imported large numbers of slaves from Lower Guinea and the Congo. According to various DNA studies, majority of the African ancestry among black and mixed-race Puerto Ricans comes from a number of ethnic groups forcibly brought to the island. These include the Wolof, Mandinka, Fon-Dahomey, Fang, Bubi, Yoruba, Igbo, and Bakongo, correlating to the modern-day countries of Senegal, Mali, Benin, Equatorial Guinea, Nigeria, and Angola. Slaves came from all parts of the western coast of Africa, from Senegal to Angola. The Yoruba and Congolese made the most notable impacts to Puerto Rican culture. There's been evidence of intercolonial migration between Puerto Rico and its neighbors during the 1700s and 1800s, which consisted of migration of free blacks and purchases of slaves from neighboring islands.

=== Language ===
Many African slaves imported to Cuba, Dominican Republic and Puerto Rico spoke "Bozal" Spanish, a Creole language that was Spanish-based, with Congolese and Portuguese influence. Although Bozal Spanish became extinct in the nineteenth century, the African influence in the Spanish spoken in the island is still evident in the many Kongo words that have become a permanent part of Puerto Rican Spanish.

=== Music ===
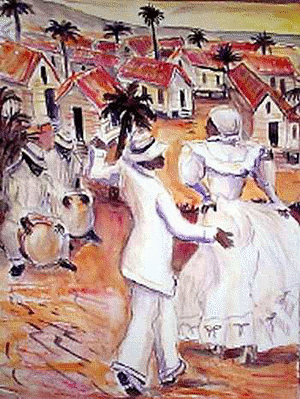
Baile De Loiza Aldea by Antonio Broccoli Porto

External audio
- You may listen to the "Bomba Puertorriqueña" as performed at the Nuyorican Cafe in Puerto Rico here
- and to a "Potpourri of Plenas" interpreted by Rene Ramos here.

Puerto Rican musical instruments such as barriles, drums with stretched animal skin, and Puerto Rican music-dance forms such as bomba or plena are likewise rooted in Africa. Bomba represents the strong African influence in Puerto Rico. Bomba is a music, rhythm and dance that was brought by West African slaves to the island. Historically the genre and its dance were popular among both slaves and free blacks.

Plena is another form of folkloric music of African origin. Plena was brought to Ponce by blacks who immigrated north from the English-speaking islands south of Puerto Rico. Plena is a rhythm that is clearly African and very similar to Calypso, Soca and Dance hall music from Trinidad and Jamaica.

Bomba and plena were played during the festival of Santiago (St. James), since slaves were not allowed to worship their own gods. Bomba and plena evolved into countless styles based on the kind of dance intended to be used. These included leró, yubá, cunyá, babú and belén. The slaves celebrated baptisms, weddings, and births with the "bailes de bomba". Slaveowners, for fear of a rebellion, allowed the dances on Sundays. The women dancers would mimic and poke fun at the slave owners. Masks were and still are worn to ward off evil spirits and pirates. One of the most popular masked characters is the Vejigante (vey-hee-GANT-eh). The Vejigante is a mischievous character and the main character in the Carnivals of Puerto Rico.

Until 1953, bomba and plena were virtually unknown outside Puerto Rico. Island musicians Rafael Cortijo (1928–1982), Ismael Rivera (1931–1987) and the El Conjunto Monterrey orchestra introduced bomba and plena to the rest of the world. What Rafael Cortijo did with his orchestra was to modernize the Puerto Rican folkloric rhythms with the use of piano, bass, saxophones, trumpets, and other percussion instruments such as timbales, bongos, and replace the typical barriles (skin covered barrels) with congas.

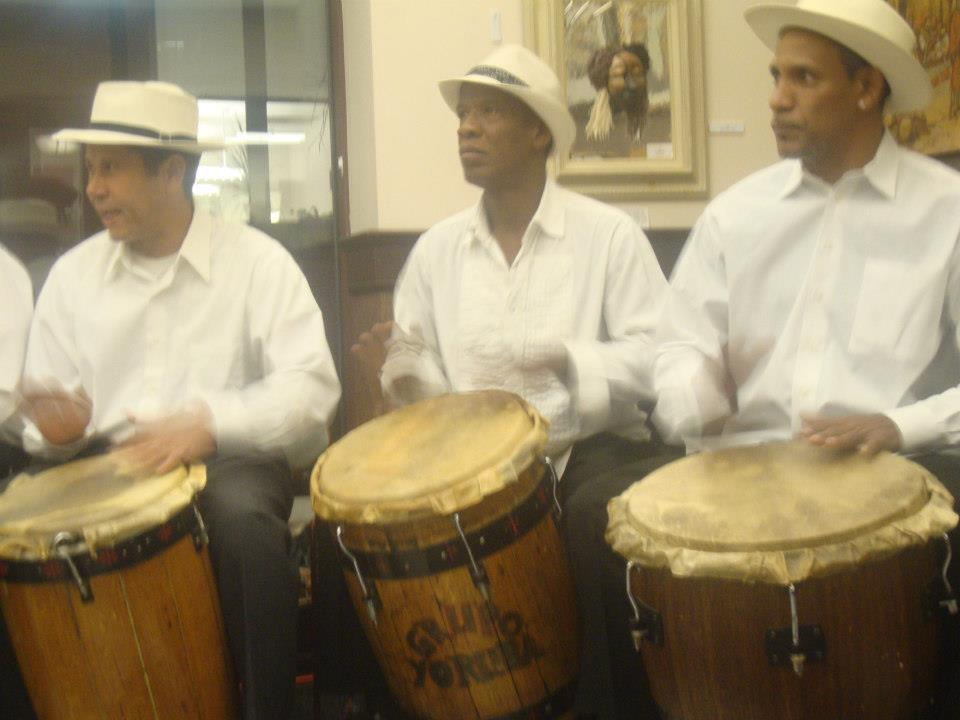
Puerto Ricans playing the Barril drum traditionally used in Bomba music

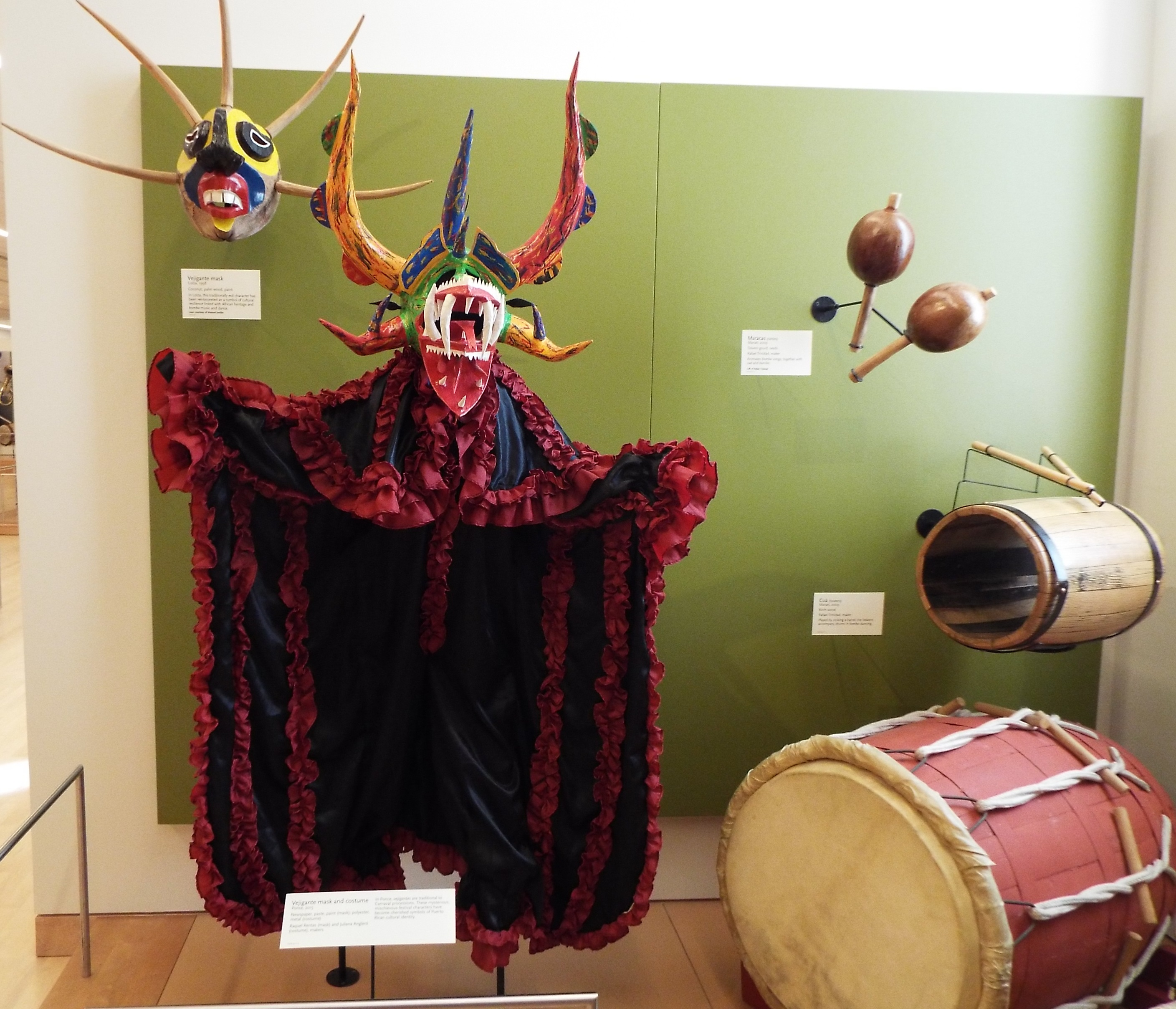
Vejigante Mask and Costume

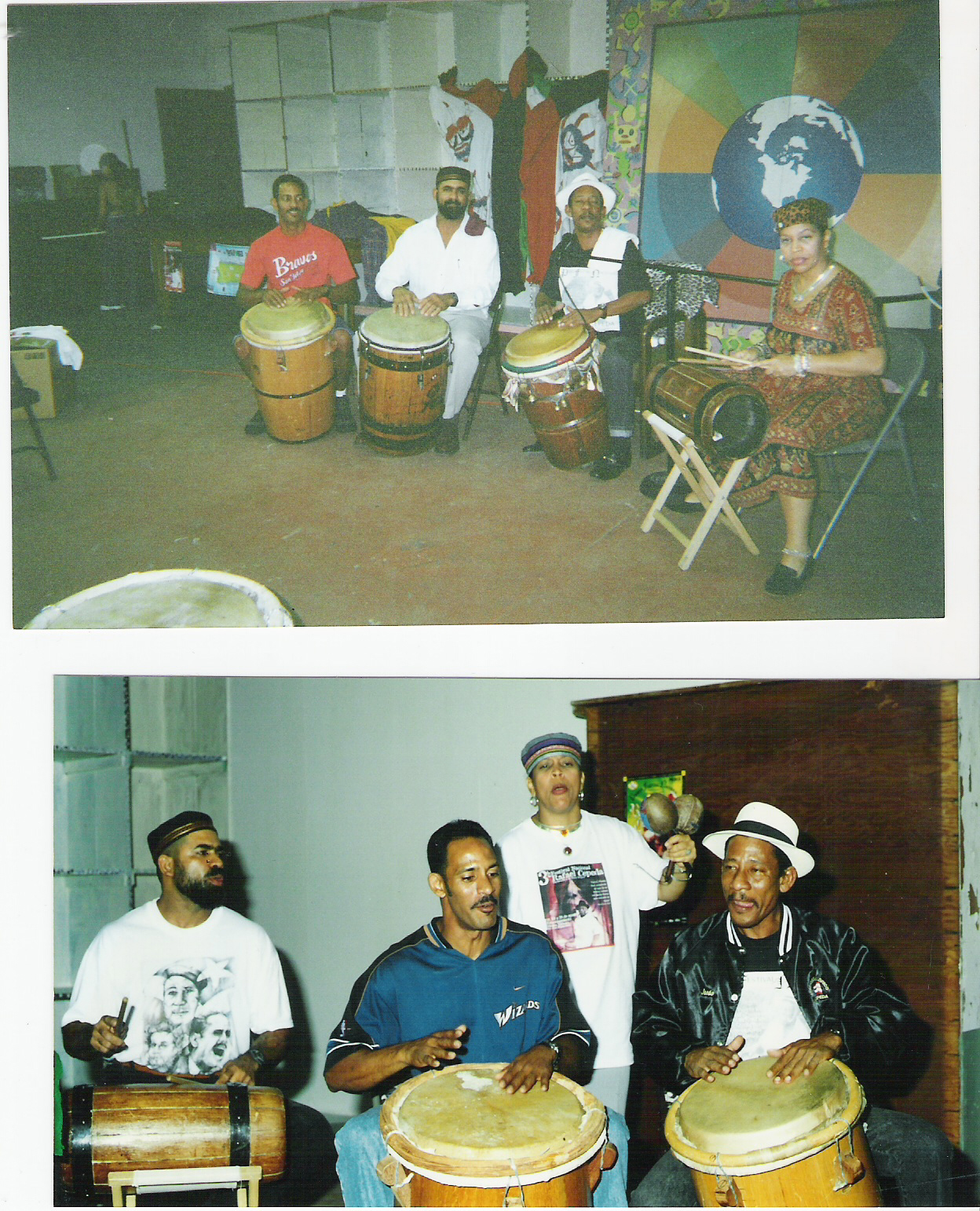
Two or more drums, always one Subidor and one Buleador or more, Cuajo and one Maraca

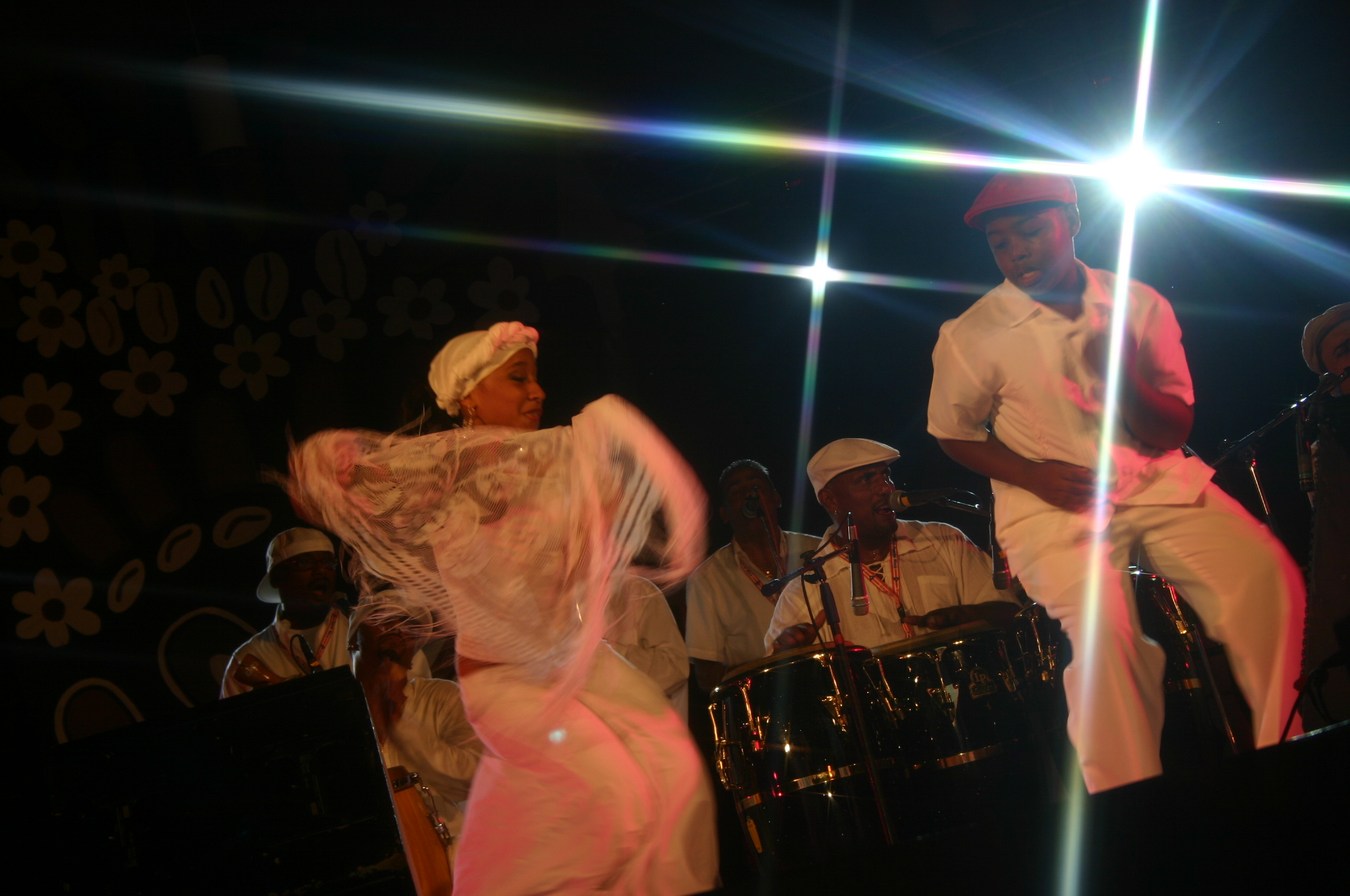
Bomba Dance in Guaynabo, Puerto Rico

=== Cuisine ===
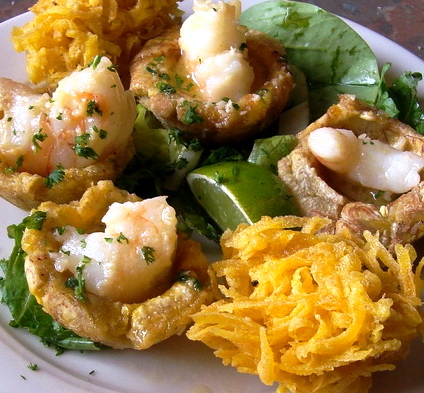
Plantain "arañitas" and "tostones rellenos"

Nydia Rios de Colon, a contributor to the Smithsonian Folklife Cookbook, also offers culinary seminars through the Puerto Rican Cultural Institute. She writes of the cuisine:

Puerto Rican cuisine also has a strong African influence. The melange of flavors that make up the typical Puerto Rican cuisine counts with the African touch. Pasteles, small bundles of meat stuffed into a dough made of grated green banana (sometimes combined with pumpkin, potatoes, plantains, or yautía) and wrapped in plantain leaves, were devised by African women on the island and based upon food products that originated in Africa."—Nydia Rios de Colon, Arts Publications

Similarly, Johnny Irizarry and Maria Mills have written:

"The salmorejo, a local land crab creation, resembles Southern cooking in the United States with its spicing. The mofongo, one of the island's best-known dishes, is a ball of fried mashed plantain stuffed with pork crackling, crab, lobster, shrimp, or a combination of all of them. Puerto Rico's cuisine embraces its African roots, weaving them into its Indian and Spanish influences."

=== Religion ===
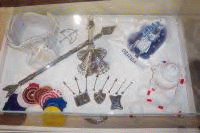
Santería artifacts

In 1478, the Catholic Monarchs of Spain, Ferdinand II of Aragon and Isabella I of Castile, established an ecclesiastical tribunal known as the Spanish Inquisition. It was intended to maintain Catholic orthodoxy in their kingdoms.

The Inquisition maintained no rota or religious court in Puerto Rico. However, heretics were written up and if necessary remanded to regional Inquisitional tribunals in Spain or elsewhere in the western hemisphere. Africans were not allowed to practice non-Christian, native religious beliefs. No single organized ethnic African religion survived intact from the times of slavery to the present in Puerto Rico. But, many elements of African spiritual beliefs have been incorporated into syncretic ideas and practices. Santería, a Yoruba-Catholic syncretic mix, and Palo Mayombe, Kongolese traditions, are also practiced in Puerto Rico, the latter having arrived there at a much earlier time. A smaller number of people practice Vudú, which is derived from Dahomey mythology.

Palo Mayombe, or Congolese traditions, existed for several centuries before Santería developed during the 19th century. Guayama became nicknamed "the city of witches", because the religion was widely practiced in this town. Santeria is believed to have been organized in Cuba among its slaves. The Yoruba were brought to many places in the Caribbean and Latin America. They carried their traditions with them, and in some places, they held onto more of them. In Puerto Rico and Trinidad Christianity was dominant. Although converted to Christianity, the captured Africans did not abandon their traditional religious practices altogether. Santería is a syncretic religion created between the diverse images drawn from the Catholic Church and the representational deities of the African Yoruba ethnic group of Nigeria. Santería is widely practiced in the town of Loíza. Sister traditions emerged in their own particular ways on many of the smaller islands. Similarly, throughout Europe, early Christianity absorbed influences from differing practices among the peoples, which varied considerably according to region, language and ethnicity.

Santería has many deities said to be the "top" or "head" God. These deities, which are said to have descended from heaven to help and console their followers, are known as "Orishas". According to Santería, the Orishas are the ones who choose the person each will watch over.

Unlike other religions where a worshiper is closely identified with a sect (such as Christianity), the worshiper is not always a "Santero". Santeros are the priests and the only official practitioners. (These "Santeros" are not to be confused with the Puerto Rico's craftsmen who carve and create religious statues from wood, which are also called Santeros). A person becomes a Santero if he passes certain tests and has been chosen by the Orishas.

=== Academia ===
The role of freed slaves has been analyzed in documents, with particular theses taking a socio critical approach. Most of the literature and investigations, however, center around those that remained slaves. In Historia de la Esclavitud Negra en Puerto Rico, Luis Díaz Soler dedicated a chapter to free blacks. Fernando Picó touched upon the sudject in Libertad y Servidumbre. La Esclavitud Urbana en San Juan (Mariano Negrón, Raúl Mayo) and Literatura Negra del Siglo XIX also explore how free blacks influenced Puerto Rico.

== Current demographics ==
Considering the 2020 Census is the first to allow respondents to apply multiple races in their responses, there is considerable overlap that while appearing contradictory is in reality reflective of Puerto Rico's mixed history and population. As of the 2020 Census, 17.1% of Puerto Ricans identify as white, 17.5% identify as black or black in combination with another race, 2.3% as Amerindian, 0.3% as Asian, and 74% as "Some Other Race Alone or in Combination." Although estimates vary, most sources estimate that about 60% of Puerto Ricans have significant African ancestry. The vast majority of black people in Puerto Rico are Afro–Puerto Rican, meaning they have been in Puerto Rico for generations, usually since the slave trade, forming an important part of Puerto Rican culture and society. Recent black immigrants have come to Puerto Rico, mainly from the Dominican Republic, Haiti, and other Latin American and Caribbean countries, and to a lesser extent directly from Africa as well. Many black migrants from the United States and the Virgin Islands have moved and settled in Puerto Rico. Also, many Afro–Puerto Ricans have migrated out of Puerto Rico, namely to the United States. There and in the US Virgin Islands, they make up the bulk of the U.S. Afro-Latino population.

Under Spanish and American rule, Puerto Rico underwent a whitening process. Puerto Rico went from around 50% of its population classified as black and mulatto in the first quarter of the 19th century, to nearly 80% classified white by the middle of the 20th century. Under Spanish rule, Puerto Rico had laws such as Regla del Sacar or Gracias al Sacar, which classified persons of mixed African-European ancestry as white, which was the opposite of "one-drop rule" in US society after the American Civil War. Additionally, the Spanish government's Royal Decree of Graces of 1815 encouraged immigration from other European countries. Heavy European immigration swelled Puerto Rico's population to about one million by the end of the 19th century, decreasing the proportion Africans made of Puerto Rico. In the early decades under US rule, census takers began to shift from classifying people as black to "white" and the society underwent what was called a "whitening" process from the 1910 to the 1920 census, in particular. During the mid 20th century, the US government forcefully sterilized Puerto Rican women, especially non-white Puerto Rican women.

Afro–Puerto Rican youth are learning more of their peoples' history from textbooks that encompass more Afro–Puerto Rican history. The 2010 US census recorded the first drop of the percentage white people made up of Puerto Rico, and the first rise in the black percentage, in over a century. Many of the factors that may possibly perpetuate this trend include: more Puerto Ricans may start to identify as black, due to increasing black pride and African cultural awareness throughout the island, as well as an increasing number of black immigrants, especially from the Dominican Republic and Haiti, many of whom are illegal immigrants, and increasing emigration of white Puerto Ricans to the mainland US.

The following lists only include only the number of people who identify as black and do not attempt to estimate everyone with African ancestry. As noted in the earlier discussion, several of these cities were places where freedmen gathered after gaining freedom, establishing communities.

The municipalities with the highest percentages of residents who identify as black, as of 2020, were:

Loiza: 64.7% Canóvanas: 33.4% Maunabo: 32.7% Rio Grande: 32% Culebra: 27.7% Carolina: 27.3% Vieques: 26% Arroyo: 25.8% Luquillo: 25.7% Patillas: 24.1% Ceiba: 23.8% Juncos: 22.9% San Juan: 22.2% Toa Baja: 22.1% Salinas: 22.1% Cataño: 21.8%

A landmark study published in 2023 and focused exclusively on studying the genome of self-identified Afro–Puerto Ricans discovered that, as indicated by mitochondrial haplogroups, their average matrilineal lineage is 66% African, 29% Indigenous American and 5% European. Along the Y chromosome, 52% had African, 28% had Western European, 16% had Eurasian, and, notably, 4% had Indigenous American patrilines, which until that point had been believed to be extinct in the modern population of Puerto Rico.

== Notable Afro–Puerto Ricans ==
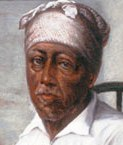
Rafael Cordero

- Rafael Cordero (1790–1868), born free in San Juan, Puerto Rico. Of African descent, he became known as "The Father of Public Education in Puerto Rico". Cordero was a self-educated Puerto Rican who provided free schooling to children regardless of their race. Among the distinguished alumni who attended Cordero's school were future abolitionists Román Baldorioty de Castro, Alejandro Tapia y Rivera, and José Julián Acosta. Cordero proved that racial and economic integration could be possible and accepted in Puerto Rico. In 2004, the Roman Catholic Church, upon the request of San Juan Archbishop Roberto González Nieves, began the process of Cordero's beatification. He was not the only one in his family to become an educator. In 1820, his older sister, Celestina Cordero, established the first school for girls in San Juan.
- José Campeche (1751–1809), born a free man, contributed to the island's culture. Campeche's father, Tomás Campeche, was a freed slave born in Puerto Rico, and his mother María Jordán Marqués came from the Canary Islands. Since she was considered European (or white), her children were born free. Of mixed-race, Campeche was classified as a mulatto, a common term during his time meaning of African-European descent. Campeche is considered to be the foremost Puerto Rican painter of religious themes of the era.
- Captain Miguel Henriquez (c. 1680–17??), former pirate who became Puerto Rico's first black military hero by organizing an expeditionary force that captured a British colonial settlement on the island of Vieques. Capt. Henriques was received as a national hero when he returned the island of Vieques back to the Spanish Empire and Puerto Rico. He was awarded "La Medalla de Oro de la Real Efigie"; and the Spanish Crown named him "Captain of the Seas", awarding him a letter of marque and reprisal which granted him the privileges of a privateer.
- Rafael Cepeda (1910–1996), also known as "The Patriarch of Bomba and Plena", was the patriarch of the Cepeda family. The family is one of the most famous exponents of Puerto Rican folk music, with generations of musicians working to preserve the African heritage in Puerto Rican music. The family is well known for their performances of the bomba and plena folkloric music and are considered by many to be the keepers of those traditional genres.
- Sylvia del Villard (1928–1990), member of the Afro-Boricua Ballet. She participated in the Afro–Puerto Rican productions, Palesiana y Aquelarre and Palesianisima. In 1968, she founded the Afro-Boricua El Coqui Theater, which was recognized by the Panamerican Association of the New World Festival as the most important authority of Black Puerto Rican culture. The Theater group were given a contract which permitted them to present their act in other countries and in various universities in the United States. In 1981, del Villard became the first and only director of the Office of Afro–Puerto Rican Affairs of the Institute of Puerto Rican Culture. She was known as an outspoken activist who fought for the equal rights of the Black Puerto Rican artist.

=== In fiction ===
- The Marvel Comics superhero Miles Morales / Spider-Man is Afro–Puerto Rican, as he was born to an African-American father and an Afro–Puerto Rican mother.

== See also ==
- List of Puerto Ricans
- Immigration to Puerto Rico series:
  - Cultural diversity in Puerto Rico
  - Chinese immigration to Puerto Rico
  - Corsican immigration to Puerto Rico
  - French immigration to Puerto Rico
  - German immigration to Puerto Rico
  - Irish immigration to Puerto Rico
  - Jewish immigration to Puerto Rico
  - Spanish immigration to Puerto Rico
- Puerto Rican people
- African Americans
- Afro-Caribbean
- Afro-Latin Americans - North, Central and South America
- Afro-Spaniard
- Black Latino Americans - United States of America
- Bozal Spanish (language)
- List of topics related to Black and African people
- Racism in Puerto Rico
