= Discalced Carmelite Convent of San José and Santa Teresa =

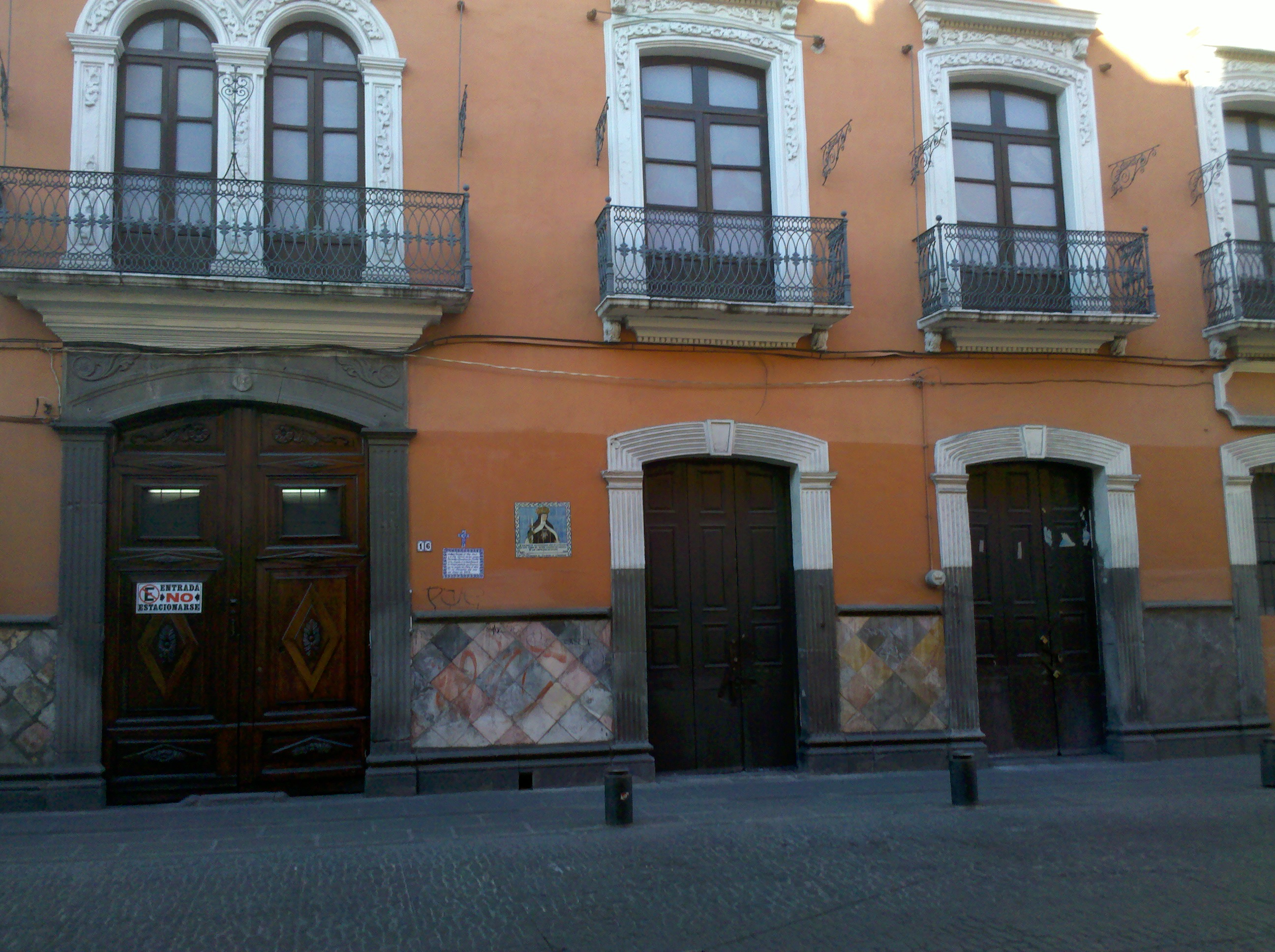

The Discalced Carmelite convent of San José and Santa Teresa in Puebla traces its history back to its founding after the arrival in New Spain of Ana and Beatriz Núñez of Montealbán, sisters originally from Gibraleón in southern Spain. They had come to the New World to reunite with their brother Pedro Núñez, who died soon after their arrival in Veracruz. Beatriz married Juan Bautista Machorro, whereas her sister Ana remained at her sister's home in a sort of domestic cloister.

Following her example, Ana Núñez, together with Elvira Suárez and Juana Fajardo, founded a religious community dedicated to San José in 1563 in Veracruz. However, because of the weather and regional insecurity, they decided to move the house to the city of Puebla. In 1601 they received a license from Don Diego Romano to found a sanctuary for women. He gave them a chapel and a small adjoining house, adding more women to the group.

In 1603, on 6 June, a papal bull authorized the founding of a Carmelite Order convent, the first in the new world, which came to the city of Puebla the same year. Later, on 27 December 1604, a royal decree authorised the construction of the convent of Saint José and Santa Teresa.
