= Portuguese expedition to Huelva =

- Part of Portuguese–Castilian War (1336–1339)
Date	August–September 1336
Location	Shores of Huelva, Andalusia
Result	Inconclusive

Commanders and leaders
D. Gonçalo Camelo	D. Nuno Portocarreiro (DOW)

Strength
20 ships 2,000 men	40 galleys 5,700 men

The Portuguese expedition to Huelva was a naval campaign commanded by D. Gonçalo Camelo during the Portuguese–Castilian War of 1336–1339. Launched by King Afonso IV of Portugal against Alfonso XI of Castile, the fleet of 20 ships and 2,000 men raided and looted the towns of Lepe and Gibraleón.

On 8 September 1336, a major combat in Lepe resulted in the death of the town's alcaide, D. Nuno Portocarreiro, and the capture of Camelo, who was subsequently freed in an exchange before the fleet retreated to Lisbon with their plunder.

Learning of this, Alfonso XI organized an armada of 40 galleys and 5,700 men so that "they should go to the coast of the King of Portugal and make an incursion into the land of their enemies, just as the Portuguese were doing to them". However, almost all the ships were lost in a storm, leaving them unable to continue the voyage.

The result of this campaign remains disputed among contemporary authors.
