= Royal Decree of Graces of 1815 =

Legal order approved by the Spanish Crown

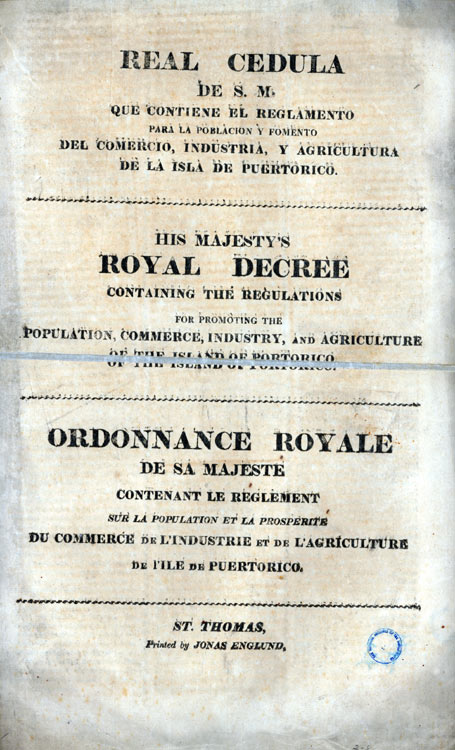
- Royal Decree of Graces of 1815 reprinted in St. Thomas (then part of the Danish West Indies)
- Original title: Real Cédula de Gracia de 1815
- Ratified: 10 August 1815
- Location: General Archives of Puerto Rico in the Institute of Puerto Rican Culture
- Purpose: A real cédula (English: royal certificate) approved by the Spanish Crown to encourage Spaniards, and Europeans of non-Spanish origin but coming from countries allied to Spain, to settle in and populate Puerto Rico.

The Royal Decree of Graces of 1815 (Spanish: Real Cédula de Gracia de 1815) is a decree approved by the Spanish Crown in August 1815 to encourage Spaniards, and Europeans of non-Spanish origin but coming from countries in good standing with Spain, to settle in and populate Puerto Rico.

== Royal Decree of Graces ==
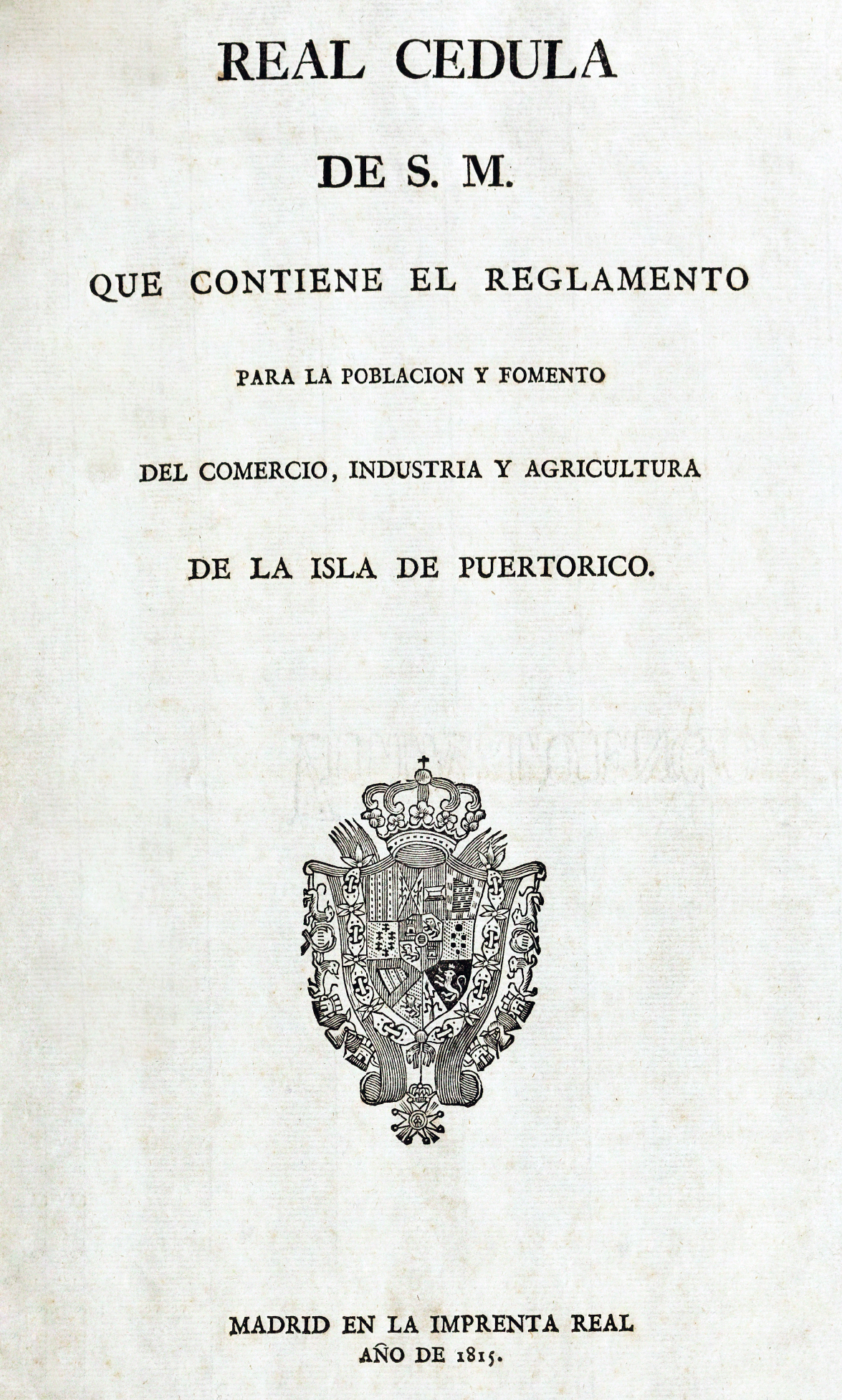
Official edition issued by the Royal Press (Imprenta Real) in Madrid

On 10 August 1815, King Ferdinand VII of Spain approved a real cédula de gracia (royal decree of graces), which granted Puerto Rico the right to have commercial ties with countries which were in good standing with Spain. It also granted free land to many settlers, as well as incentives for investing money and providing technology for agricultural development to Spaniards willing to relocate and settle there.

This was the third royal decree of graces approved by the Spanish Crown to foster economic development in the empire's overseas Latin American possessions. King Charles III approved the Royal Decree of Graces of 1777 in regard to the Captaincy General of Venezuela, and the Royal Decree of Graces of 1789, which granted his subjects the right to purchase slaves and to participate in the flourishing transatlantic slave trade.

Puerto Rico remained largely undeveloped and underpopulated until 1830, when a great number of immigrants, many coming from the Spanish provinces of Catalonia, Mallorca, the Canary Islands, and many non-Spanish settlers coming from countries in good standing with Spain, like Austria, Ireland, Portugal, Italy and France, began to arrive in Puerto Rico. They gradually contributed developing commercial enterprises in Puerto Rico, mostly based on agricultural produce like sugarcane, coffee, and tobacco plantations, and on the use of African slave labor and free but needy sharecroppers, peons or jornaleros.

== Situation in the Spanish Colonies ==
Early in the 19th century, Spanish colonies in the Western Hemisphere fought a series of wars for their independence. In South America, Simón Bolívar and José de San Martín led colonists to victory against Spanish rule; in Mexico, José María Morelos led the movement.

By 1825, the Spanish Empire had lost control of all of its Latin American possessions with the exception of Puerto Rico and Cuba. And, pro-independence sentiments were growing in both territories. Trying to forestall the loss of these colonies, the Spanish Crown revived the Royal Decree of Graces of 1815. Spanish authorities printed the royal cédula in English and in French, as well as in Spanish, and distributed copies throughout Europe to attract loyal non-Spanish settlers, as well. However, and as it is shown in the published face page of the original Spanish Royal Decree of Graces of 1815, the name of "Puerto Rico" was translated into English by the Spanish civil authorities overseeing its publication as "Porto Rico". Nevertheless, the Crown also offered free land to many new settlers coming from countries in good standing with Spain but on the condition of swearing their loyalty to the Spanish Crown and allegiance to the Roman Catholic Church. In this way, the Spanish Crown hoped to supplant the pro-independence movements with new and loyal settlers.

== Situation in Europe ==
During the latter part of the 18th century and the beginning of the 19th century, great economic and political changes occurred in Europe. Thousands of farm workers migrated to cities seeking industrial jobs and better opportunities. Those who stayed behind to attend the farmlands suffered the widespread crop failures, brought on by long periods of drought and diseases such as the potato fungus which contributed to the Great Famine of the 1840s. Cholera epidemics broke out and starvation was widespread in Europe. Social and economic disruption also followed the European Revolutions of 1848, which erupted in Sicily and the German states. The French Revolution of 1848 contributed to the Franco-Prussian War of 1870 and more changes.

These conditions led to a massive European immigration to the Americas. Hundreds of Corsicans, Italians, French, Portuguese, Irish, Scots, Bavarian Germans, Austrians and Croatians attracted by the offers of free land by the Spanish Crown, moved to Puerto Rico and accepted the conditions for settlement. As soon as these settlers swore their loyalty to the Spanish Crown and their allegiance to the Roman Catholic Church, they were given a "Letter of Domicile". After five years, the settlers were granted a "Letter of Naturalization" that made them Spanish subjects. In 1870, to also attract non-Catholic Europeans, Spain's Cortes of Cádiz passed a law granting the right of religious freedom in the islands.

== Aftermath ==
The new settlers soon adopted the language and customs of their new homeland, and many intermarried with local residents. Many also became prominent business and political leaders. The royal decree continued in effect until 1898, when Spain finally lost Puerto Rico and Cuba, its last two Latin American possessions, to the United States under the Treaty of Paris that ended the Spanish–American War.

The original document, with face page as shown, is kept in the General Archives of Puerto Rico, part of the Institute of Puerto Rican Culture, in San Juan, Puerto Rico.

== See also ==
- Corsican immigration to Puerto Rico
- French immigration to Puerto Rico
- German immigration to Puerto Rico
- Irish immigration to Puerto Rico
- Spanish immigration to Puerto Rico
