= Paoli =

Paoli may refer to:

== People ==
- Albert De Paoli, Australian former association football player
- Alessandro Paoli (disambiguation), several people
- Amalia Paoli, soprano singer from Puerto Rico
- Ambrose De Paoli (1934–2007), American prelate of the Catholic Church
- Andrea Paoli (born 1992), Lebanese athlete
- Andrea De Paoli (born 1999), Italian footballer
- Andrew Paoli (born 1999), American soccer player
- Angelo Paoli (1642–1720), Italian Catholic priest
- Antonio Paoli (1871–1946), tenor singer from Puerto Rico
- Arturo Paoli (1912–2015), Italian priest and missionary
- Betty Paoli (1814–1894), Austrian writer
- Carl Paoli, American actor and stuntman
- Carly Paoli (born 1989), British trained singer
- Cécile Paoli, French actress
- Cesare Paoli, Italian historian and paleographer
- Daniele De Paoli (born 1973), Italian former racing cyclist
- Dennis Paoli, screenwriter and playwright
- Elidio De Paoli (born 1948), Italian politician
- Enrico Paoli (1908–2005), Italian chess master
- Evelina Paoli (1878–1972), Italian stage and film actress
- Francisco Matos Paoli (1915–2000), Puerto Rican poet, critic and essayist
- Fred Paoli (born 1954), American former rugby union and American football player
- Gino Paoli (1934–2026), Italian singer-songwriter
- Jean Paoli, French computer scientist
- Letizia Paoli (born 1966), Italian criminologist
- Lorenzo Paoli (born 1988), Italian footballer
- Napoléon Paoli (1892–?), French racing cyclist
- Olivia Paoli, Puerto Rican suffragist
- Paolo Rossi de Paoli (1900–1966), Italian architect, engineer and urban planner
- Pasquale Paoli (1725–1807), Corsican patriot and leader
- Philippe Paoli (born 1995), Lebanese footballer
- Pierre Paoli (1921–1946), French agent
- Pietro Paoli (1759–1839), Italian mathematician
- Raoul Paoli (1887–1960), French athlete, boxer, wrestler, rower and actor
- Rodolfo De Paoli (born 1978), Argentine football manager and former player
- Vanina Paoli-Gagin (born 1967), French politician
- Verónica de Paoli (born 1973), Argentine hurdler
- Virginio De Paoli (1938–2009), Italian football player and coach

== Places ==
In the United States

- Paoli, Colorado, town
- Paoli, Georgia, unincorporated community
- Paoli, Indiana, town
- Paoli Township, Orange County, Indiana
- Paoli, Oklahoma, town
- Paoli, Pennsylvania, census-designated place
- Paoli, Wisconsin, unincorporated community
- Paoli (SEPTA station), commuter rail station in the suburbs of Philadelphia, Pennsylvania

== Other uses ==
- Paoli (surname)
- Paoli, Inc., manufacturer of office furniture located in Orleans, Indiana and a subsidiary of HNI Corporation
- Casa Paoli, the childhood home of Antonio Paoli
- Battle of Paoli, in the American Revolutionary War
- USNS Paoli (T-AO-157), a U.S. Navy fuel tanker
- Plural of Paolo, an Italian coin
