= Paoli (surname) =

Paoli is an Italian surname, derived from the given name Paolo (Paul). Notable people with the surname include:

- Amalia Paoli (c. 1861–1941), Puerto Rican soprano, sister of Antonio
- Ambrose De Paoli (1934–2007), Roman Catholic cleric and Papal Nuncio
- Angelo Paoli (1642–1720), Italian Carmelite
- Antonio Paoli (1871–1946), Puerto Rican tenor
- Carl Paoli, actor and stuntman
- Cécile Paoli, French actress
- Cesare Paoli (1840–1902), Italian historian and paleographer
- Enrico Paoli (1908–2005), Italian chess master
- Francisco Matos Paoli (1915–2000), poet, critic, essayist and Puerto Rican nationalist, nominated for the Nobel Prize in literature
- Gino Paoli (1934–2026), Italian singer-songwriter
- Jean Paoli, French computer scientist
- Lorenzo Paoli (born 1988), Italian footballer
- Ottaviano di Paoli (died 1206), Italian Roman Catholic cardinal
- Pasquale Paoli (1725–1807), Corsican general and patriot who headed the Corsican struggle for independence
- Virginio De Paoli (1938–2009), Italian football player and coach
