= Biographical museum =

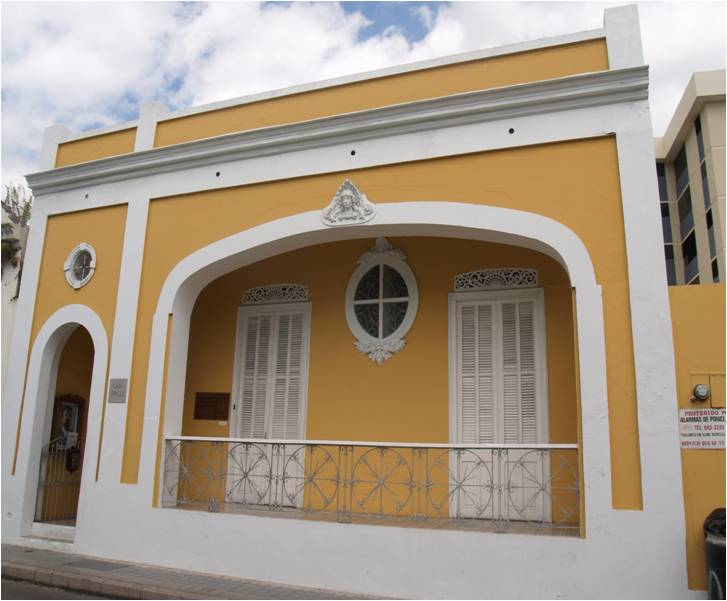
The Casa Paoli museum in Barrio Cuarto, Ponce, Puerto Rico, relates the story of Puerto Rican tenor Antonio Paoli

A biographical museum is a museum dedicated to displaying items relating to the life of a single person or group of people, and it may also display the items collected by their subjects during their lifetimes. Some biographical museums are located in a house or other site associated with the lives of their subjects, such as Casa Paoli Museum. Other examples of house-based biographical museums are Anne Frank House in Amsterdam, Gamal Abdel Nasser Museum in Cairo, Quinta de Bolívar in Bogotá, Colombia, the Mannerheim Museum in Helsinki, the Keats-Shelley Memorial House in Rome, Italy, and the Gjergj Kastrioti Skënderbeu National Museum in Krujë, Albania.

Some homes of famous people house collections in the sphere of the owner's expertise or interests, in addition to collections of their biographical material. One such example is the Wellington Museum at Apsley House in London, home of the 1st Duke of Wellington, which, in addition to biographical memorabilia of the Duke of Wellington's life, also houses his collection of fine paintings. Other biographical museums, such as many of the American presidential libraries, are housed in specially constructed buildings.

The largest segment of historic houses in the United Kingdom is dedicated to writers.

== See also ==
- Ennigaldi-Nanna's museum
- International Council of Museums
- International Museum Day (18 May)
- List of museums
- .museum
- Museum education
- Museum fatigue
- Museum label
- Types of museum
