= Casona Césari =

Historic house in Yauco, Puerto Rico

- U.S. National Register of Historic Places
- Puerto Rico Historic Sites and Zones
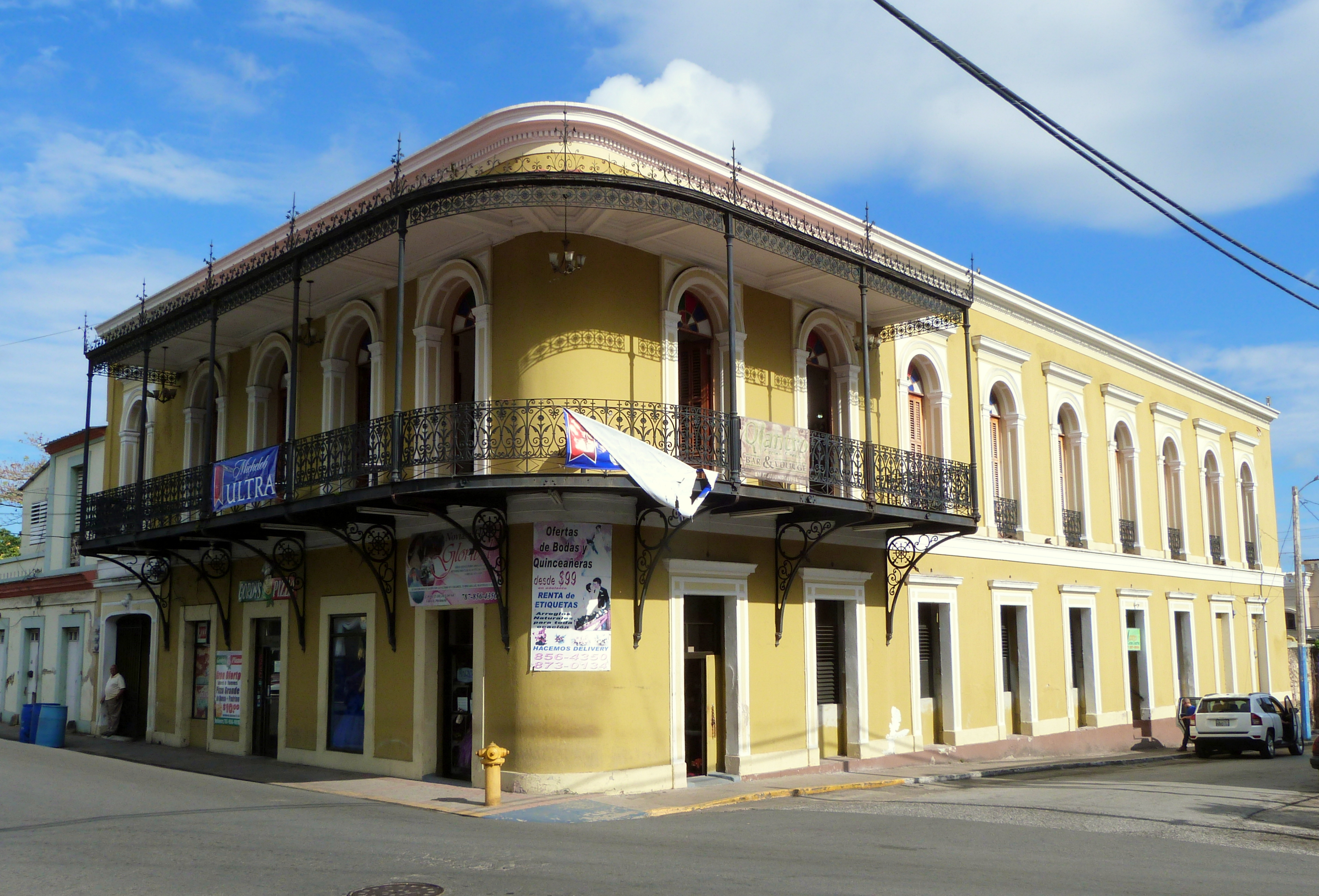
- Casona Cesari in 2017.

- Location within Puerto Rico
- Location: 25 de Julio Street in Yauco, Puerto Rico
- Coordinates: 18°01′59″N 66°51′03″W
- Built: 1893
- Architect: Antonio Mattei Lluberas
- Architectural style: Creole vernacular
- NRHP reference No.: 85000114
- RNSZH No.: 2001-(RS)-23-JP-SH

Significant dates
- Added to NRHP: January 16, 1985
- Designated RNSZH: May 16, 2001

The Antonio Mattei Lluberas Residence (Spanish: Residencia Antonio Mattei Lluberas), also known as La Casona Césari (Spanish for 'the Césari Manor') and the House of the Twelve Doors (La Casa de las Doce Puertas), is a historic late 19th-century manor house located in Yauco Pueblo, the administrative and historic center of the municipality of Yauco, Puerto Rico. The house was designed by architect Antonio Mattei Lluberas and built in 1893 by Angelo Cesari Poggi (Ángel Césari Poggi in its localized Spanish spelling) of the Césari Antongiorgi family, a Corsican-Puerto Rican family who was important in the development of the sugarcane industry of Yauco and southwestern Puerto Rico.

== Architecture ==
The two-story manor house has a distinctive hockey stick-shape that borders the corner of the Matienzo Cintrón and 25 de Julio streets. The main structure is made of thick concrete masonry walls with wooden beams that support a flat brick roof. The wooden window designs became a typeface and inspiration for other private residences that were built afterwards in Yauco and beyond. The house is notable for the integration of various types of traditional construction techniques of time while also importing new techniques foreign in Puerto Rico at the time such as the use of forged cast iron in both the structural and ornamentation systems of the building. The cast iron was built and imported from the Saint-Louis Foundry in Paris. The architectural style of the building is eclectic and foreign in the island at the time of its construction, bringing inspiration from the French Creole designs which were famous in New Orleans at the time.

== History ==
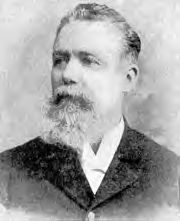
Antonio Mattei Lluberas, architect and one of the namesakes of the house.

The Cesari manor house is the largest urban property in downtown Yauco and is widely seen as an architectural landmark of the Corsican community of Yauco and Puerto Rico. The house was one of the earliest in Puerto Rico to be designed with a cast-iron girder and brick roof style. Its designer was architect Antonio Mattei Lluberas, after whom the house is often named, a rich landowner of Corsican and Catalan descent who studied architecture in Paris. He later became famous for his opposition to the Spanish control of Puerto Rico and became an independence revolutionary leader in the failed 1896 and 1897 revolts in Guayanilla and Yauco, respectively. The 1897 revolt in Yauco became notable for being the first time when the flag of Puerto Rico was raised in the island. Mattei Lluberas became exiled after these attempts and returned to become mayor of Yauco during the Spanish–American War. He did not live in the house he designed, which instead became the property of another Corsican businessman - Ángel Césari Poggi and his wife, Angela Antongiorgi Rodríguez. This Corsican-Puerto Rican family owned many acres of lands and properties throughout Yauco and southern Puerto Rico which they developed as sugarcane plantations, processing plants and refineries (centrales).

The house soon became locally known as the "House of the Twelve Doors" (La Casa de las Doce Puertas) and, along with the Franceschi Antongiorgi House and the town parish church, it became a historic and architectural landmark of the town. The building has functioned as a private residence, public and private offices and restaurants throughout its existence. It was greatly affected by the 2020 earthquake and has been under constant repair ever since. The structure along with numerous others have been declared endangered in the earthquake aftermath by the municipal government. In 2023 the historic center of Yauco was declared a historic district by the Puerto Rico Planning Board and the Institute of Puerto Rican Culture, with 222 structures including the Cesari Manor House being included in this designation.

== Gallery ==
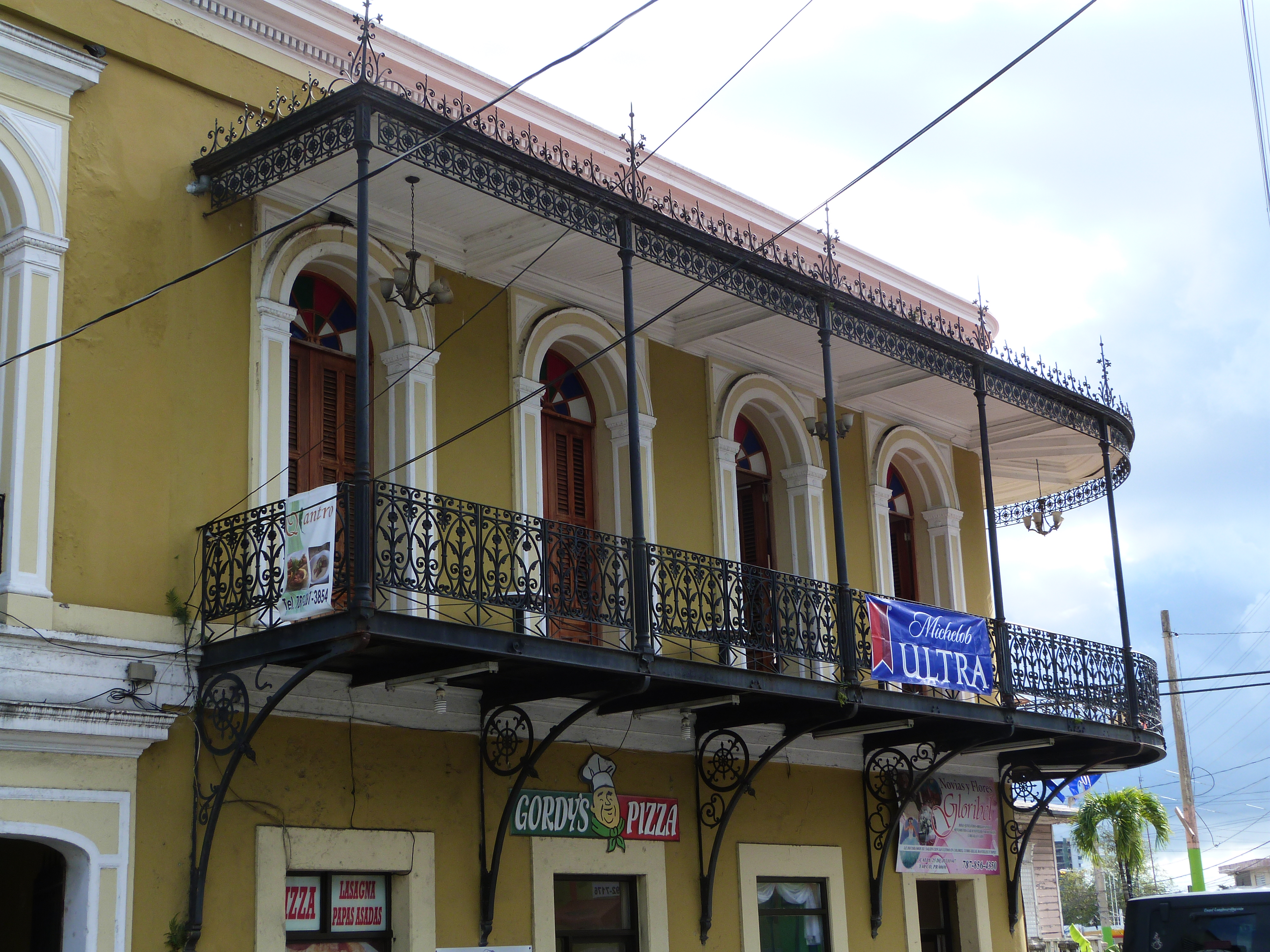
Balcony details as seen from Pacheco Street in 2017.

== See also ==
- Corsican immigration to Puerto Rico
- National Register of Historic Places listings in southern Puerto Rico
