= Emilio J. Pasarell =

Puerto Rican historian (1891–1974)

- Born: 1891; Ponce, Puerto Rico
- Died: 1974 (aged 82–83)
- Occupations: Writer, novelist, and essayist
- Spouse: Maria Rios Rios
- Writing career
- Subjects: Antonio Paoli, Teatro Tapia

Emilio J. Pasarell (1891–1974) was a Puerto Rican short story writer, novelist, essayist and historian.

== Origin ==
Pasarell was born in Ponce, Puerto Rico in 1891, the son of Manuel Pasarell-Mila de la Rosa (also known as Manuel Pasarell y Mila de la Rosa).

== Works ==
Some of Pasarell's writings include:

- Notes of the Inauguration of the San Juan (Puerto Rico) Municipal Theater - A careful documentation of the history of Teatro Tapia
- Ripples on the Surface of Great Themes.
- Orígenes y desarrollo de la afición teatral en Puerto Rico. San Juan, Puerto Rico: Editorial del Departmento de Instruccion Publica de Puerto Rico. 1970. 465 pages plus 78 laminated pages at the end of the text. - A detailed description of the life of Antonio Paoli.
- Esculcando el Siglo XIX en Puerto Rico. Barcelona, Spain: Editorial Rumbos. 1967. 132 pages.
- Conjunto Literario. Barcelona, Spain: Editorial Rumbos. 1963. 168 pages.
- De la Pluma al Papel. Barcelona, Spain: Editorial Rumbos. 1967. 282 pages.
- Ensayos y Articulos. San Juan, Puerto Rico: Editorial Cordillera. 1968. 217 pages.

== Legacy ==
Emilio Pasarell is recognized, along with a handful of other Ponce historians, at Ponce's Park of Illustrious Ponce Citizens.

== See also ==
- List of Puerto Rican writers
- List of Puerto Ricans
- Puerto Rican literature
