= Logia Masónica Hijos de la Luz =

Masonic building in Yauco, Puerto Rico

- U.S. National Register of Historic Places
- Puerto Rico Historic Sites and Zones
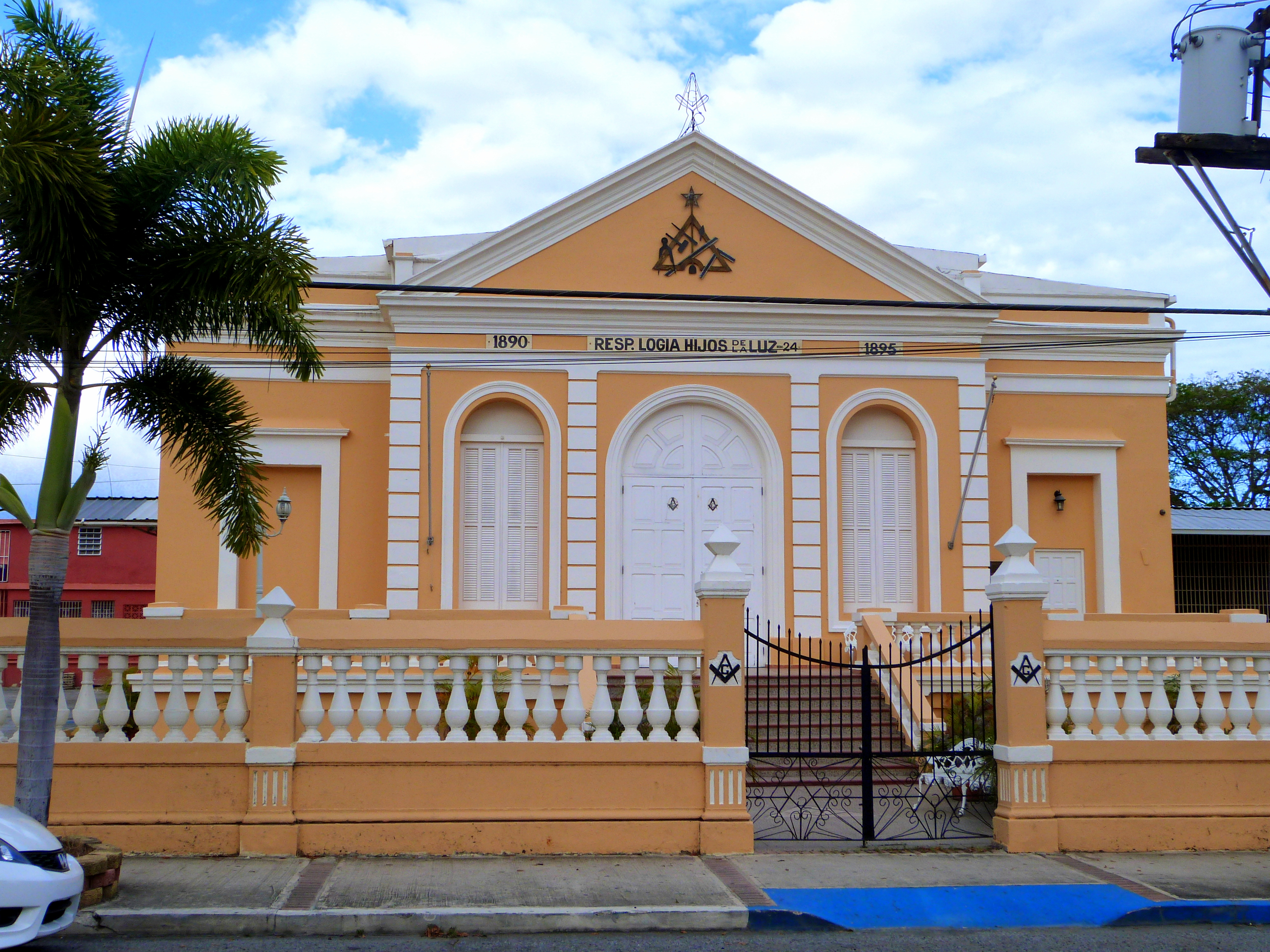

- Location within Puerto Rico
- Location: Avenida Jose C. Barbosa, Yauco, Puerto Rico
- Coordinates: 18°01′55″N 66°50′54″W
- Area: less than one acre
- Built: 1894
- Built by: Jesus Emmanuelli
- Architect: André Troublard
- Architectural style: Classical Revival
- NRHP reference No.: 88000684
- RNSZH No.: 2001-(RS)-23-JP-SH

Significant dates
- Added to NRHP: June 9, 1988
- Designated RNSZH: May 16, 2001

The Logia Masónica Hijos de la Luz, on Avenida José C. Barbosa in Yauco, Puerto Rico, is a stuccoed masonry building constructed in 1894. It was listed on the National Register of Historic Places in 1988, and on the Puerto Rico Register of Historic Sites and Zones in 2001.

It is Classical Revival in style, designed by French architect André Troublard and built by master builder Jesus Emmanuelli.

Also known as Logia Masónica, it served as a meeting hall.

It is probably the earliest built and oldest surviving purpose-built Masonic building in Puerto Rico.

André Troublard also designed the Casa Franceschi Antongiorgi, also in Yauco and listed on the National Register.

== See also ==
- Logia Adelphia, in Mayagüez, Puerto Rico, also NRHP-listed
