= Casa Agostini =

- U.S. National Register of Historic Places
- Puerto Rico Historic Sites and Zones
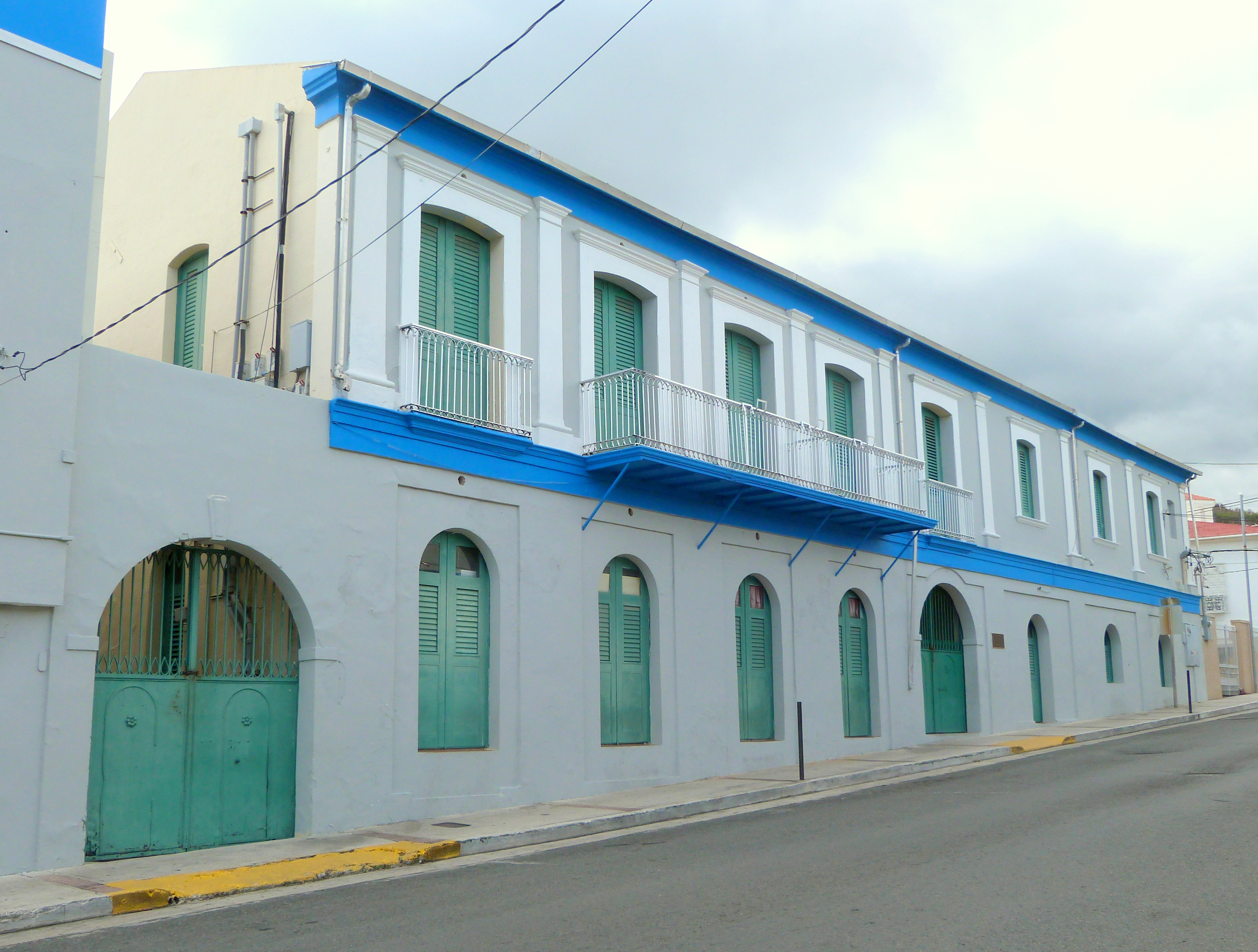

- Location within Puerto Rico Location within the Caribbean
- Location: Dr. Gatell Street, between Santiago Vivaldi and Comercio Streets, Calle San Rafael, Yauco, Puerto Rico
- Coordinates: 18.034566°N 66.847933°W
- Area: less than one acre
- Architect: Pinti, Miguel Briganti
- Architectural style: Classical Revival
- NRHP reference No.: 88000682
- RNSZH No.: 2001-(RS)-23-JP-SH

Significant dates
- Added to NRHP: June 9, 1988
- Designated RNSZH: May 16, 2001

The Casa Agostini, in Yauco, Puerto Rico, is a Classical Revival house designed by Miguel Briganti Pinti. It was built in the early 1800s and was listed on the National Register of Historic Places in 1988 and to the Puerto Rico Register of Historic Sites and Zones in 2001.

It is a two-story stuccoed masonry commercial and residential building that is L-shaped in plan. Its 30 metres (33 yd) main facade has eight bays.

It served as a coffee warehouse and processing plant, as well as a residence and was built for Corsican immigrant Jose Maria Agostini Santini.
