= Héctor Andrés Negroni =

US Air Force officer and historian (born 1938)

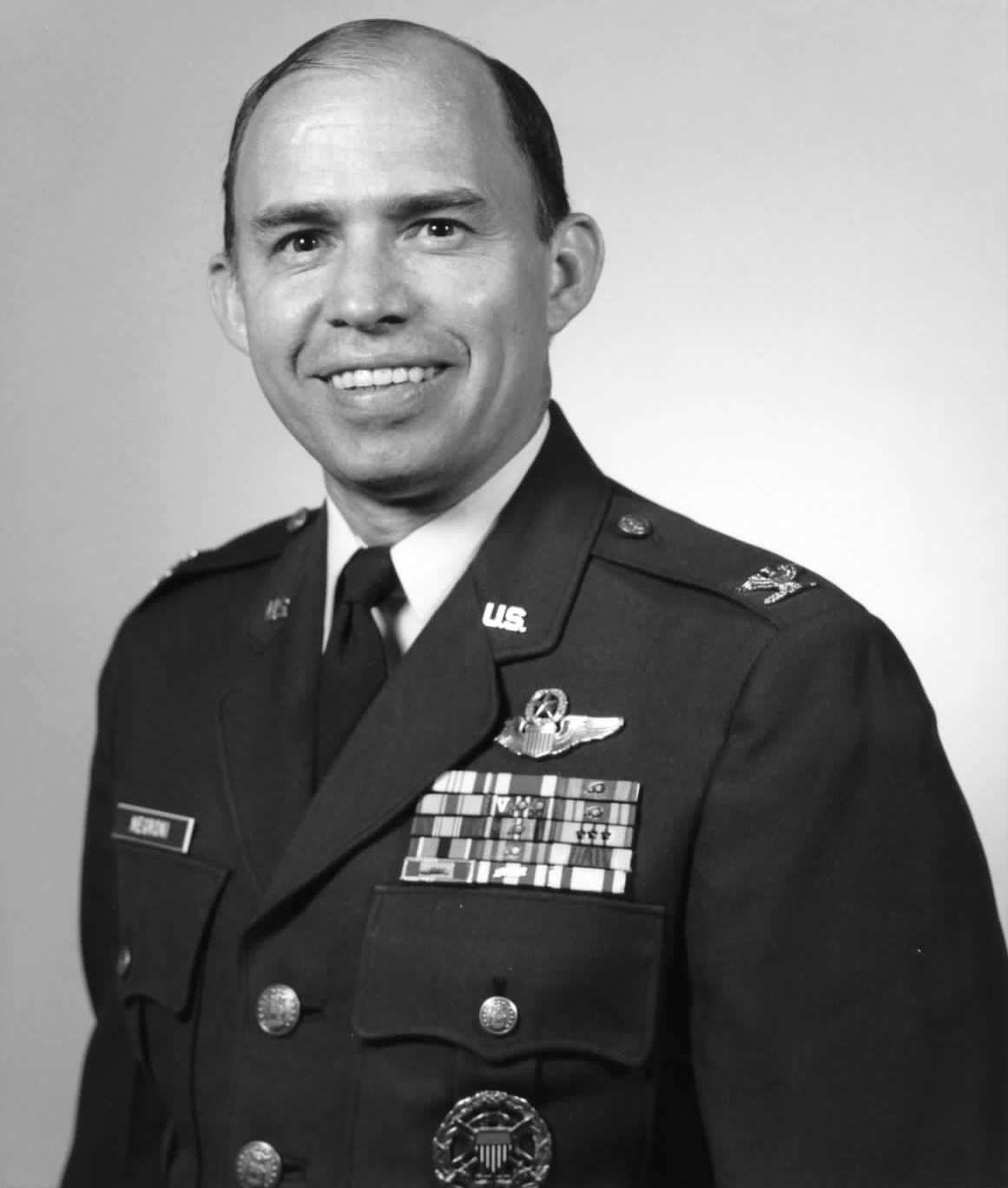
- Colonel Héctor Andrés Negroni; First Puerto Rican graduate of the United States Air Force Academy
- Born: January 30, 1938 (age 88); Yauco, Puerto Rico
- Military career
- Allegiance: United States of America
- Branch: United States Air Force
- Service years: 1961–1985
- Rank: Colonel
- Commands: Commander, 3rd Mobile Aerial Port Squadron Vice Commander, Air Force District of Washington
- Conflicts: Cuban Missile Crisis; North Yemen Civil War; Dominican Civil War; Vietnam War; Falklands War; Contras Crisis
- Awards: Legion of Merit; Defense Meritorious Service Medal; Meritorious Service Medal; Air Medal
- Other work: general manager McDonnell Douglas Spain Ltd general manager AlliedSignal Aerospace Company-Huntsville Site Manager Honeywell International-Huntsville

Colonel Héctor Andrés Negroni (born January 30, 1938) is a United States Air Force officer, historian, senior aerospace defense executive, author, and the first Puerto Rican graduate of the United States Air Force Academy. He was commissioned by Spain's Fifth Centennial Commission to write the "Historia Militar de Puerto Rico" (A Military History of Puerto Rico).

== Early years ==
Negroni was born in the town of Yauco, Puerto Rico, which is located in the southwestern region of the island. There he received his primary education. While still young, his parents moved to Santa Rosa, California. During this period of his life, his family continued to move, and Negroni was to attend school in the Mexican city of Veracruz and finally in Philadelphia, Pennsylvania.

In 1956, he graduated from Frankford High School and enrolled in Drexel University, located in Philadelphia, Pennsylvania, where he completed one year of civil engineering before he received appointments for all three service academies, The United States Military Academy at West Point, The United States Naval Academy at Annapolis, Maryland, and the United States Air Force Academy at Colorado Springs. He decided for the Air Force Academy, where in 1961 he earned a Bachelor of Science degree in engineering with a major in public affairs. Negroni was commissioned a second lieutenant in the United States Air Force and was awarded his navigator wings. While at Drexel University, Negroni was a member of Pi Kappa Phi fraternity.

== Military career ==
In 1962, he received his pilot wings after completing pilot training at Reese Air Force Base, in Texas. In 1964, the Air Force presented him with a scholarship to pursue a master's degree at the University of Puerto Rico. In 1967, he graduated from the University of Puerto Rico and earned a Master of Arts degree in Hispanic Studies. Negroni served as an assistant professor of Spanish in the Air Force Academy between the years 1967 and 1971. There he taught and directed all the Spanish courses. He also holds degrees from the Industrial College of the Armed Forces and the Air War College.

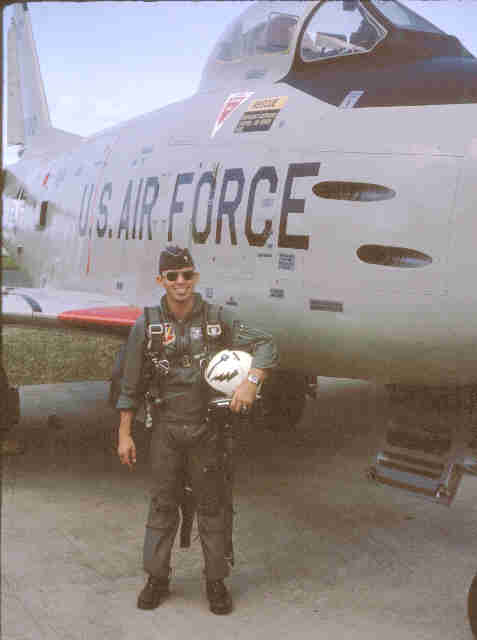
An F-86H, one of the fighter planes flown by Colonel Negroni

Negroni participated in combat missions during the Vietnam War and accumulated over 600 combat hours. During his tour he served in the 553rd Reconnaissance Squadron stationed in Korat, Thailand and as chief of combat operation in the 7th Airborne Command and Control Squadron in Udon, Thailand.

In 1973, he was assigned to the 317th Tactical Airlift Wing, Pope Air Force Base, North Carolina, serving as an aircraft commander, flight commander, assistant operations officer, and wing chief of aircrew training. He was promoted to lieutenant colonel in 1977 and became the commander of the 3rd Mobile Aerial Port Squadron.

In 1978, he was named the chief of liaison for the Joint United States Military Group in Spain. The Spanish Government presented Negroni with its highest Air Force peacetime award, the Aeronautical Merit Cross for his contributions to the successful implementation of the United States-Spain Treaty of Friendship and Cooperation.

In 1980, Negroni was reassigned to the Pentagon and in 1981 promoted to colonel. Among the positions which he held in the Pentagon are the following:

- Latin America Politico-Military Affairs Officer for the Joint Chiefs of Staff.
- Vice commander for the Air District of Washington at Bolling Air Force Base.
- Chief of the Policy and Management Division, Directorate of International Program, Deputate of Programs and Resources at the Headquarters United States Air Force in the Pentagon.

== Written works ==
Negroni has authored over 200 articles which have been published in various U.S. and foreign journals. His research of the Corsican-Puerto Rican connection has provided a wealth of information about Puerto Rico's ties with Corsica. Among Negroni's works is "La Genealogía de Puerto Rico" (The Genealogy of Puerto Rico) which provides an in-depth study of the Puerto Rican people.

He is the author of Historia Militar de Puerto Rico (A Military History of Puerto Rico (the book)), commissioned by Spain's Fifth Centennial Commission, "Historia de Yauco" (The History of Yauco) and The History of the Negroni Family.

== Later years ==
In October 1985, Negroni retired from the United States Air Force after 24 years of service. He then joined the McDonnell Douglas Corporation. He was named manager of the International Business Development for the Harpoon anti-ship missile program in the McDonnell Douglas Astronautics Company. In 1987 he was appointed manager of international program development for McDonnell Aircraft Company. In 1990 he was named general manager for McDonnell Douglas Spain Ltd., a subsidiary of McDonnell Douglas Corporation.

He is currently married to Joan Leah Blanco, with whom he had two sons, Hector Emilio, a CEO for Fundamental Credit Opportunities in New York City and Xavier Andres, a managing director for Pierpont Securities in Stamford, Connecticut. Negroni and his wife resided in Vienna, Virginia where he was a commercial pilot, a navigator and a certified Spanish-English diplomatic translator-interpreter.

In December 1992, Negroni became a private management consultant specializing in project, marketing, and proposal management. He was also involved with the American Society of Mechanical Engineers, where he acted as eastern regional director; the Latin American Management Association as executive director and T.E. Systems, Inc. as vice president of business development. In 1996, he joined AlliedSignal Aerospace Company (which later became Honeywell International) as the general manager for their Huntsville, Alabama office. His responsibilities include marketing, sales and support activities with NASA's Marshall Space Center and the U.S. Army Aviation and Missile Command at the Redstone Arsenal in Huntsville, Alabama. He retired from the aerospace defense industry in 2000 and currently resides with his wife in Bonita Springs, Florida.

In 2022 Héctor Andrés Negroni was inducted to the Puerto Rico Veterans Hall of Fame.

== Awards and recognitions ==
Among Col. Negroni's U.S. and foreign decorations and awards are the following:

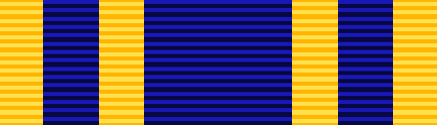

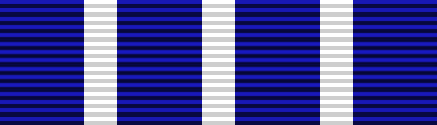

	Legion of Merit	
Defense Meritorious Service Medal	Meritorious Service Medal	Air Medal with one oak leaf cluster
Joint Service Commendation Medal	Air Force Commendation Medal	Air Force Outstanding Unit Award with Valor device and 2 bronze oak leaf clusters
Combat Readiness Medal with one oak leaf cluster	National Defense Service Medal	Armed Forces Expeditionary Medal with one oak leaf cluster
Vietnam Service Medal with three Service stars	Humanitarian Service Medal	Air Force Longevity Service Award with one oak leaf cluster
Small Arms Expert Marksmanship Ribbon	Air Force Training Ribbon	Vietnam Gallantry Cross
Vietnam Campaign Medal	Pennsylvania Service Ribbon	Puerto Rico Caribbean Emergency Ribbon

Badges:

- US Air Force Command Pilot Badge
- Office of the Joint Chiefs of Staff Identification Badge

=== Foreign decorations ===
- Cruz de Mérito Aeronáutico (Aeronautical Merit Cross), Spain
- Command Pilot Wings, Bolivia
- Spanish Air Force Pilot Wings, Spain

== See also ==
- List of Puerto Ricans
- List of Puerto Rican military personnel
- Corsican immigration to Puerto Rico
- Hispanics in the United States Air Force
