= Corsican immigration to Puerto Rico =

19th-century phenomenon

Corsican immigration to Puerto Rico (Spanish: Puertorriqueños corso) resulted in the 19th century from widespread economic and political changes in Europe that made life difficult for the peasant and agricultural classes in Corsica and other territories. The Second Industrial Revolution drew more people into urban areas for work, widespread crop failure resulted from long periods of drought, and crop diseases, and political discontent rose. In the early nineteenth century, Spain lost most of its possessions in the so-called "New World" as its colonies won independence. It feared rebellion in its last two Caribbean colonies: Puerto Rico and Cuba. The Spanish Crown had issued the Royal Decree of Graces of 1815 (Real Cédula de Gracias) which fostered and encouraged the immigration of European Catholics, even if not of Spanish origin, to its Caribbean colonies.

Hundreds of families emigrated from Corsica to Puerto Rico. Corsicans and those of Corsican descent played an instrumental role in the development of the economy of the island, especially in the coffee industry.

== First documented Corsican immigrants ==
Juan Fantauzzi was the first documented Corsican to immigrate to Puerto Rico. He was born about 1734 in Morsiglia, Corsica. He immigrated to what is now Aguadilla in the 1760s, where he married Josefa Martínez. Two known children of theirs are Francisco and Juan María Fantauzzi. He died November 5, 1798. His death certificate confirms his Corsican origin.

Antonio Silvestri was a Corsican who immigrated to Puerto Rico and settled in Cabo Rojo in 1762. He married Maria Francisca de Rivera in that town sometime in the 1770s and had a total of 16 children. He died in Cabo Rojo on May 18, 1820, at the age of 74.

Marcos Rotuli was a Corsican who came to Puerto Rico in the year of 1763 with the infantry Regiment of Navara during the Anglo-Spanish War of 1762–1763. He later served in the Fijo battalion and the Milicias Disiplinadas in San Juan as well as taking part in the Battle of San Juan in 1797. In 1798, after attaining the rank of Captain, he was later stationed in Yauco where he was in charge of the Milicias Disciplinadas of that town. He also had a relative named Domingo Capas y Rotuli who was a coffee farmer and lived in the area since 1782. Marcos Rotuli died on November 20, 1802, in Yauco at the age of 72.

Pedro Antonio de Paula Antonetti was a Corsican who settled in the town of Yauco and married Isabel Rodriguez on May 2, 1787. He died in Yauco on January 30, 1810, at the age of 100.

Antonio Juliani was a Corsican soldier in the Regiment of Naples. He was born in Ajaccio and married Maria Abad de Burgos in San Juan on February 1, 1790.

== 19th century Corsica ==
Corsica is an island located west of Italy and southeast of mainland France. Corsica belonged to the Republic of Genoa (before Genoa became part of Italy) and in 1768 was ceded to France to pay off debt. The island's people relied largely on an agricultural economy for survival.

There were political and economic changes in Europe in the late 18th/early 19th centuries. These changes greatly affected the lives of the French and the Corsicans. With the Second Industrial Revolution, many agricultural workers moved to the cities in the hope of finding better-paying jobs and making better lives. Long periods of drought and crop diseases led to widespread crop failures (e.g. the phylloxera epidemic destroyed the Corsican wine industry and much of the French). A cholera epidemic caused many deaths, and there was a general deterioration in economic conditions. Many Corsican farms began to fail.

The resulting widespread political discontent erupted in bitter armed conflict between the people and their governments, particularly in the Revolutions of 1848. King Louis-Philippe of France was overthrown in that revolution and a republic was declared with a Provisional Government. Three new political groups emerged during that era: they were the liberals, radicals, and the socialists. The combination of man-made and natural disasters in Corsica left an acute feeling of hopelessness. All this came about at a time when Spain was growing fearful of the possibility of a rebellion in her Caribbean colonies, Puerto Rico and Cuba.

== Spanish Royal Decree of Graces ==
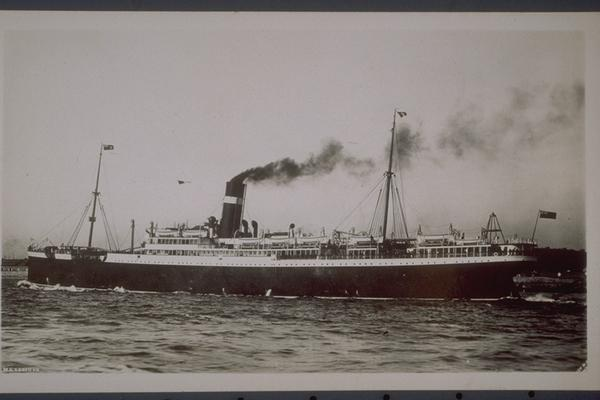
Type of steamship in which Corsicans arrived in Puerto Rico

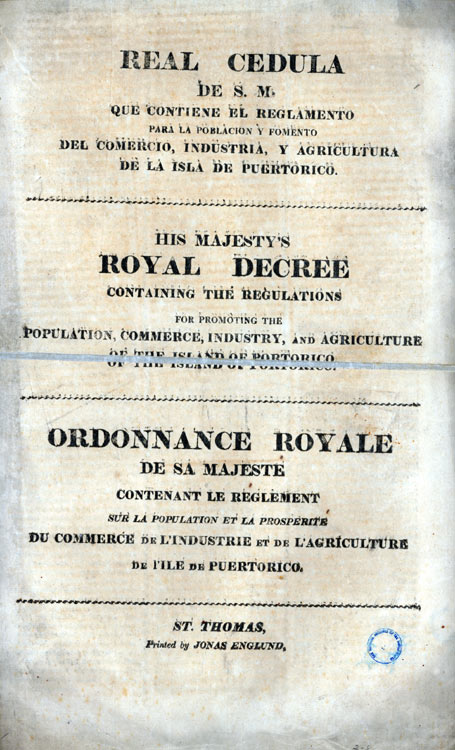
Royal Decree of Graces, 1815

By 1825, Spain had lost the entirety of her territories in Mexico, Central and South America. It struggled to prevent rebellion in the Caribbean colonies. It decided to encourage immigration to the islands by European Catholics, for instance from Ireland, Corsica, and Italy, thinking they could establish a loyal base grateful for the opportunity. In 1815, the Spanish Crown had issued the Royal Decree of Graces (Real Cédula de Gracias) which fostered the immigration of non-Spanish European Catholics to its Caribbean colonies.

As the island of Puerto Rico is very similar in geography to Corsica, it appealed to new immigrants. Under the Spanish Royal Decree of Graces, the Corsicans and other immigrants were granted land and initially given a "Letter of Domicile" after swearing loyalty to the Spanish Crown and allegiance to the Catholic Church. After five years they could request a "Letter of Naturalization" and become Spanish subjects.

== Influence in the coffee industry ==
Hundreds of Corsicans and their families migrated to Puerto Rico from as early as 1830, and their numbers peaked in the early 1900s. The first Spanish settlers had settled and owned the land in the coastal areas, as they wanted access to the sea. The Corsicans tended to settle the mountainous southwestern region of the island, primarily in the towns of Adjuntas, Lares, Utuado, Ponce, Coamo, Yauco, Guayanilla, and Guánica. Yauco, with a rich agricultural area, attracted the majority of the Corsican settlers. The three main commodity crops in Yauco were coffee, sugar cane and tobacco.

The new settlers dedicated themselves to the cultivation of these crops, and had soon saved enough money to own and operate their own grocery stores. Some made their money from coffee. Cultivation of coffee in Yauco originally began in the Rancheras and Diego Hernández sectors, and later extended to the Aguas Blancas, Frailes and Rubias sectors. By the 1860s the Corsican settlers were the leaders of the coffee industry in Puerto Rico: seven out of ten coffee plantations were owned by Corsicans.

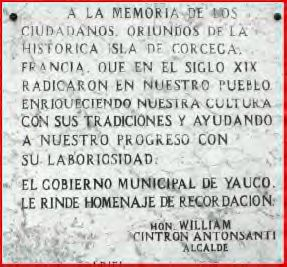
Memorial dedicated to the Corsicans in Yauco

The Mariani family of Yauco used two tactics to strengthen their position in the coffee industry:

- First, they converted a cotton gin to use it for mechanical de-husking of coffee cherries, a labor-intensive process.
- Second, they sent two of their family as representatives to visit the important European coffee buying centers and establish connections. The visit to Europe was a success, and Mariania led Puerto Rico to become an important member of the worldwide coffee industry.

The descendants of the Corsican settlers also became influential in the fields of education, literature, journalism and politics. Historians Colonel Héctor A. Negroni, (USAF-Retired), and Enrique Vivoni Farage, PhD, have researched the Corsican-Puerto Rican connection and documented substantial information about Puerto Rico's ties with Corsica. Today the town of Yauco is known as both the "Corsican Town" (Pueblo de Corsos) and "The Coffee Town" (Pueblo del Café). A memorial was installed in Yauco with the inscription, "To the memory of our citizens of Corsican origin, France, who in the 19th Century became rooted in our village, who have enriched our culture with their traditions and helped our progress with their dedicated work – the municipality of Yauco pays them homage." Corsican surnames such as Paoli, Negroni and Fraticelli are now common in the island.

== Influence in the sugar industry ==
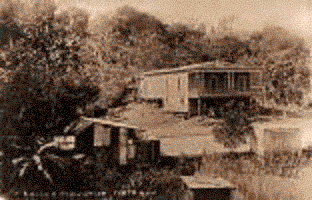
Early Yauco coffee plantation (Pre-1920)

During the 19th century, many Corsican migrants started or purchased sugar mills throughout the island: for example the mills operated in Aguadilla and Aguada by the Santoni family. Carlos Sixto Santoni Alers operated the Central Coloso mill, which was purchased from his father in 1862. Many of these mills changed hands between the Corsican-Puerto Rican community, and evident through decisions by the Puerto Rican Supreme Court.

The Spanish–American War allowed the sugar industry to thrive after American intervention, since the industry was competing and losing to Cuba and Brazil. Despite investment by American sugar companies, problems developed for the sugar industry, such as the Jones-Costigan Act. This was protectionist legislation that restricted Puerto Rican exporting of sugar in order to allow sugar companies in the mainland United States to compete.

Sugar accounted for nearly half of agriculture in Puerto Rico, but by 1964 there was a decline in sugar production due to adverse government policies and hurricanes. Most of the land which hosted these sugar plantations is now owned by the Government of Puerto Rico.

== Landmarks in Yauco and Ponce ==
Several properties in Yauco and Ponce, which once belonged to Corsican immigrants, are listed on the National Register of Historic Places in Puerto Rico.

=== Casa Franceschi Antongiorgi ===
The Casa Franceschi Antongiorgi (Franceschi Antongiorgi House) was built in 1907 by the French architect André Troublard for Alejandro Franceschi Antongiorgi, a rich landowner and lover of the arts. He frequently held banquets, concerts and meetings with visiting artists in his house.

=== Casa Antonio Mattei Lluberas ===
The Casa Antonio Mattei Lluberas, also called La Casona Césari (Césari Mansion) was built in 1893 by Antonio Mattei Lluberas. This house is also known as "The House with Twelve Doors." Later, it was acquired by Ángel Césari Poggi, husband of Ángela Antongiorgi Rodríguez. The Césari Antongiorgi family was instrumental in the development of the sugar industry in the southern region of the island.

=== Chalet Amill ===
The Chalet Amill was built in 1914 by architect Tomás Olivari Santoni for Ángel Antongiorgi Paoli. Antongiorgi Paoli gave the chalet to his daughter Ana Lucía as a wedding gift when she married Juan Amill Rodríguez. The couple soon divorced. By the mid-1920s, the chalet was converted into a hotel, first named as the Auristela Hotel and then as the Paris Hotel. This hotel was owned by Lola Bartolomei, the daughter of Francisco Bartolomei. The Bartolomei family were first-generation Corsican immigrants who owned coffee plantations in this area.

=== Mansión Negroni ===
The Mansión Negroni (Negroni Mansion), also known as Casa Agostini (Agostini House), was built around 1850 by Antonio Francisco Negroni Mattei. Later it passed to the Agostini family through the marriage of María Victoria Negroni, daughter of Antonio Francisco, and Ignacio Agostini Felipi. The Agostini family made their fortune in the exportation of coffee. They were the owners of "Sobrinos de Agostini y Compañía" (Nephews of Agostini & Co.). Ángel Pedro Agostini Natali, a member of the family, is credited with inventing the coffee grinder. This machine revolutionized the coffee industry. As a consequence, the island was able to meet the huge demand for Puerto Rican coffee, which resulted in the "Golden Age" of Yauco's economy. This house was acquired for use by the Holy Rosary School in Yauco, and a bronze plaque describes its history.

=== Residencia Lluberas Negroni ===
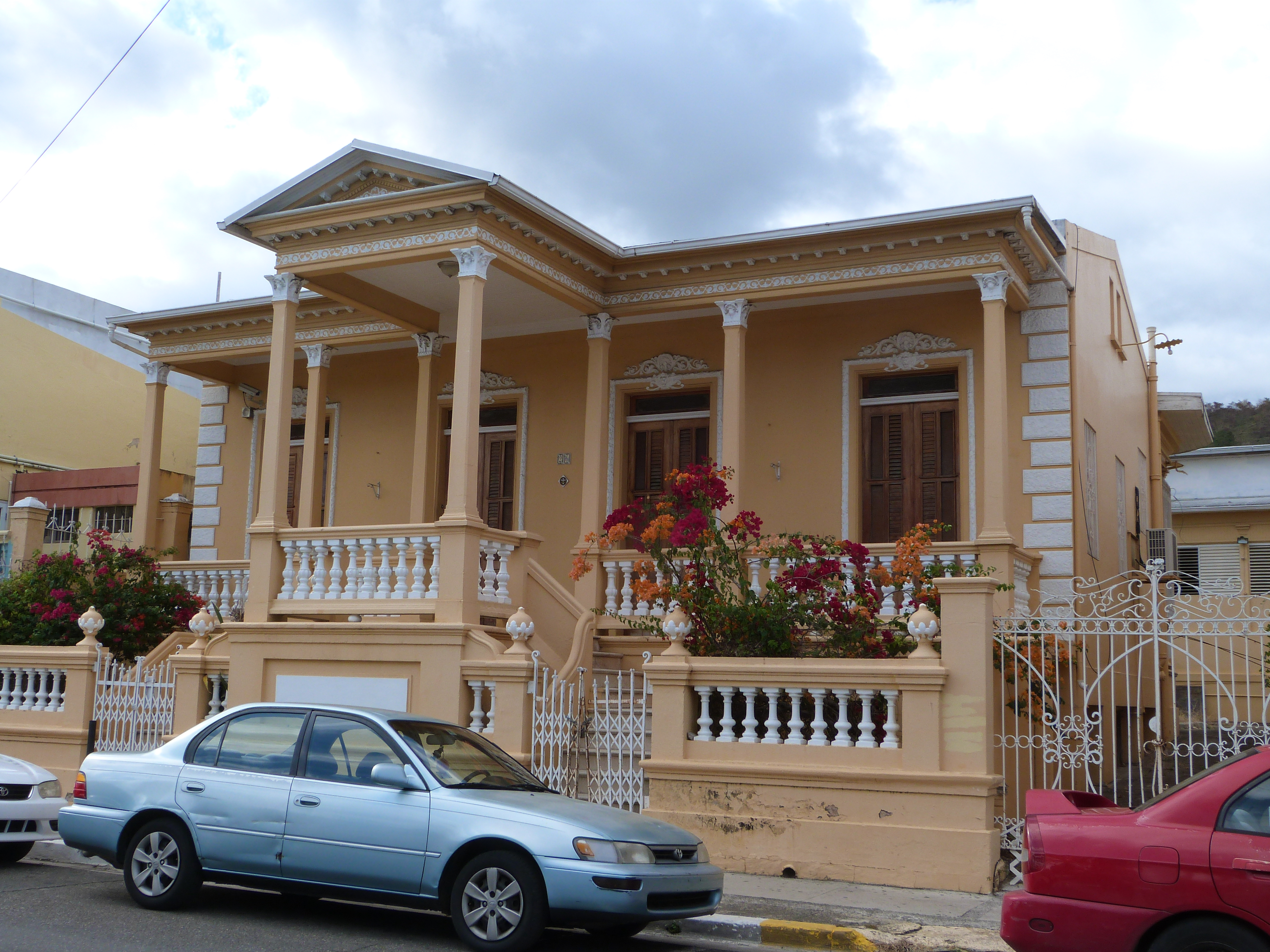
Residencial González Vivaldi

The Residencia Lluberas Negroni, currently known as the Residencia González Vivaldi (González Vivaldi Residence), was built in 1880 by Arturo Lluberas for his wife Asunción Negroni. Most recently, it was acquired by the González Vivaldi family.

=== Casa Paoli ===
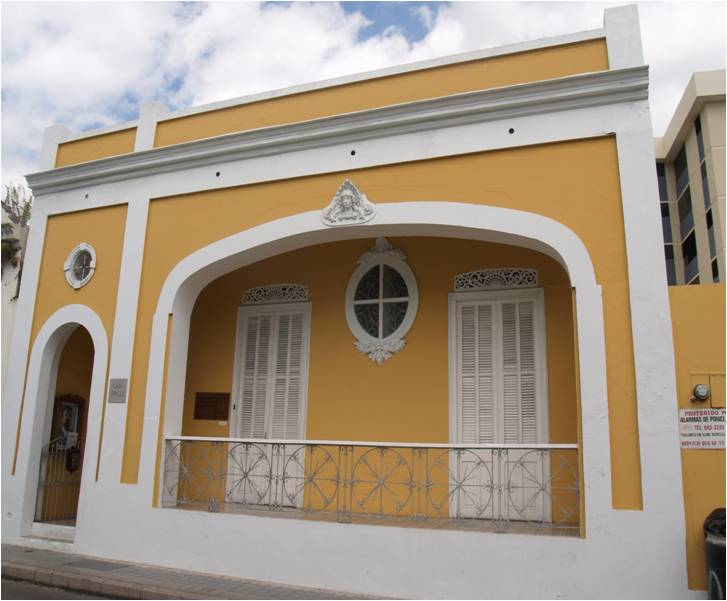
Casa Paoli

The Casa Paoli was built c. 1864 and is located on 2648 Calle Mayor, Barrio Cuarto in Ponce. It is nationally significant as the birthplace of Antonio Paoli Marcano, who became an internationally acclaimed tenor and opera singer. He performed and was widely praised in Europe and the Americas, including Caribbean islands. The house had been a wedding gift for Paoli's parents, who married at the Ponce Cathedral after the birth of the first five of their eight children. (His maternal grandfather had initially opposed the marriage because his daughter was much wealthier than Paoli's immigrant Corsican father. The couple eloped together.) Antonio, their seventh child, was born in this house, as were two of his siblings. In 2009, Casa Paoli was included in the National Register of Historic Places.

== Notable Yaucano(a)s of Corsican descent ==
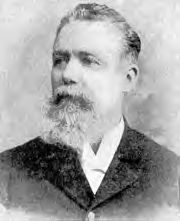
Antonio Mattei Lluberas

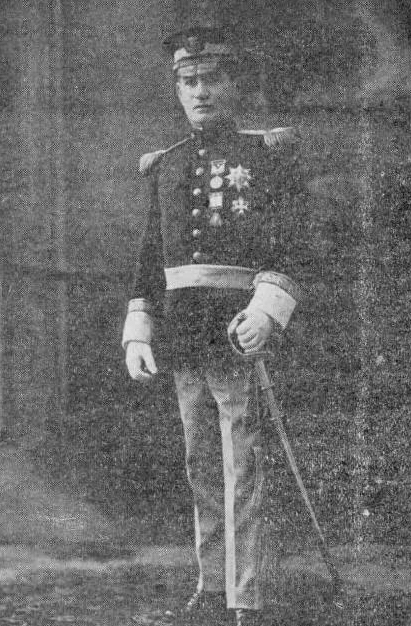
Brigadier General José Semidei Rodríguez

The following is a list of some of the notable people from Yauco of Corsican descent:

- Agostini, Amelia (1896–1996) – anthologist, poet, educator, professor at Columbia University
- Mariana Bracetti - revolutionary
- Franquiz, José A. (1906–1967) – poet
- Gilormini, Mihiel "Mike" (1918–1988) – World War II hero and founder of the Puerto Rico Air National Guard. Retired as Brigadier General in the Air National Guard
- Giovannetti, José Antonio – educator, poet
- Mariani, Pedro Domingo (1880–1925) – poet, journalist
- Mariani Ortiz, Lydia – educator, Puerto Rican rights activist
- Masini Molini, José Antonio "El Corso" (1913–1987) – agronomist. Director, Land Authority of Puerto Rico (1969–1972) – Director, Sugar Corporation of Puerto Rico (1977–1984);
- Mattei, Andrés (1863–1925) – poet, journalist;
- Mattei Lluberas, Antonio (1857–1908) – Leader of the Intentona de Yauco, revolt of 1897 and mayor of Yauco from 1904 to 1906;
- Mignucci Calder, Carlos Armando (1889–1954) – politician, mayor of Yauco (1944–52), member of Puerto Rico's Constitutional Assembly (1952);
- Negroni, Héctor Andrés – First Puerto Rican graduate of the US Air Force Academy, US Air Force Colonel, fighter pilot, senior Aerospace Executive and historian;
- Negroni, Julio Alberto – Electrical engineer who served as the First President for the Water Works Authority in Puerto Rico;
- Negroni, Santiago – journalist, educator and poet;
- Negroni Lucca, Santos (1851–1920) – Puerto Rican patriot and one of the 16 prisoners in El Morro Castle in 1887;
- Negroni Mattei, Francisco (1897–1939) – poet, journalist;
- Olivari Santoni, Tomás (1902–1904) – Architect and mayor of Yauco;
- Olivieri Gómez, Luis A. (1937) Baptist minister, musician, choral conductor, professor at UIA-Metro (1979–present);
- Olivieri Rodríguez, Ulises – poet, journalist;
- Paoli, Antonio - opera singer
- Pietrantoni Blasini, Julio (1935–2006) – lawyer, banker, president of Puerto Rico Government Development Bank from 1978 to 1985;
- Rojas Tollinchi, Francisco (1911–1965) – poet, civic leader and journalist;
- Semidei Rodríguez, José (1868–1958) – Brigadier General in the Cuban Liberation Army;

== Corsican influence in Puerto Rican and popular culture ==
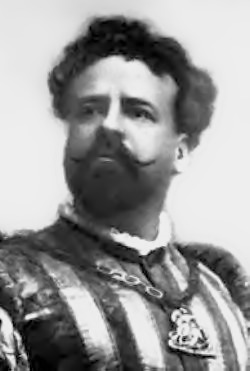
Antonio Paoli

Besides having distinguished careers in agriculture and the military, Puerto Ricans of Corsican descent have made many other contributions to the Puerto Rican way of life. Their contributions can be found in, but are not limited to, the fields of education, commerce, politics and entertainment. The Vivoni family has four notable members: Carlos Vivoni, the former Secretary of Economic Development and Commerce and, as well, former Secretary of Housing, Pedro Santos Vivoni, the first mayor of Lajas, Pierre Vivoni, a Judge and former Police Commissioner, Enrique Vivoni Farage, PhD, Professor Emeritus UPR School of Architecture and Historian, as well as José Antonio Vivoni Ramírez de Arellano, the former mayor of San Germán.

Other Puerto Ricans of Corsican descent who have led notable political careers were Ernesto Ramos Antonini, who was the first President of the House of Representatives of Puerto Rico and co-founder of the Partido Popular Democrático de Puerto Rico (Popular Democratic Party of Puerto Rico), Jaime Fuster Berlingeri, an associate justice of the Puerto Rico Supreme Court and former Resident Commissioner, Jorge Farinacci, the head of the Puerto Rican Socialist Party, and Jorge Santini, the former mayor of San Juan.

One of the first Puerto Rican entertainers to achieve world-wide fame was Antonio Paoli Marcano, an opera singer known as "The King of Tenors" and as "The Tenor of Kings." He was the first operatic artist to record an entire opera when he participated in a performance of Pagliacci by Ruggiero Leoncavallo in Italy in 1907. The Palmieri brothers, Charlie and Eddie Palmieri, were band leaders in the United States. Rock N Roll Hall of Famer Joe Negroni was a member of the rock and roll group The Teenagers. Both Américo Boschetti and Vicente Carattini were singers and composers. Carattini composed Puerto Rican Christmas-related songs. Carmen Delia Dipiní was also a notable singer of boleros.

== Surnames of the first Corsican families in Puerto Rico ==
The following is a list of some of the surnames of the first Corsican families who immigrated to the Adjuntas, Yauco, Guayanilla, and Guánica areas of Puerto Rico in the 19th Century. This list was compiled by genealogist and historian Colonel (USAF Ret.) Héctor A. Negroni who has done exhaustive research on the Corsican migration and origins of his Negroni family name.

Surnames of the first Corsican families in Puerto Rico
Adriani, Agostini, Altieri, Anciani, Angilucci, Annoni, Anpani, Antongiorgi, Antoni, Antonini, Antonmarchi, Antonmattei, Antonsanti, Antonpietri, Arenas, Artigau, Barbari, Bartoli, Bartolomei, Battistini, Benedetti, Belgodere, Bettolacce, Benvenutti, Berlingeri, Bernardini, Biaggi, Blasini, Boagna, Boccheciamp, Bocagnani, Bonelli, Bonini, Bracetti, Cardi, Carraffa, Casablanca, Casanova, Catinchi, Cervoni, Cesari, Chiavramonti, Cianchini, Costa, Damiani, Dastas, Defendini, Deodati, Dominicci, Emmanuelli, Estella, Fabbiani, Fantauzzi, Farinacci, Feliberti, Felippi, Ficaya, Figarella, Filipini, Franceschi, Franceshini, Franzuni, Fratacci, Fraticelli, Galletti, Garrosi, Gentili, Gilormini, Giovanetti, Giraldi, Giuseppi, Giuliani, Gordi, Graziani, Grillasca, Grimaldi, Guidiccelli, Lacroix, Lagomarsini, Laveri, Lazarini, Leandri, Linarola, Lipureli, Lorenzi, Lucca, Luchessi, Lucchetti, Luiggi, Maestracci, Malatesta, Marcantoni, Marcucci, Mari, Mariani, Marietti, Marini, Massari, Massei, Masini, Mattei, Maxinie, Micheli, Miguinini, Mignucci, Minucci, Modesti, Molinari, Molinelli, Molini, Montaggioni, Moravani, Mori, Muratti, Natali, Navaroli, Negroni, Nicolai, Nigaglioni, Octaviani, Olivieri, Orsini, Padovani, Paganacci, Palmieri, Paoli, Paraliticci, Pelliccia, Pellicer, Piacentini, Piazza, Pieraldi, Piereschi, Pieretti, Pierantoni, Pietrantoni, Pietri, Piovanetti, Poggi, Polidori, Quilinchini, Rafaelli, Rafucci, Rapale, Rencini, Renesi, Romanacce, Romani, Rubiani, Rutali, Safini, Saladini, Sallaveri, Santini, Santoni, Santuchi, Savelli, Secola, Semidei, Senati, Shyny, Sinigaglia, Silvagnoli, Silvestrini, Simonetti, Sisco, Sonsonetti, Tollinchi, Tomasi, Tomasini, Tossi, Totti, Vecchini, Vicchioli, Vallevigne, Vicenti, Vincenti, Vincenty, Villanueva, Vivaldi and Vivoni.

== See also ==
- Chinese immigration to Puerto Rico
- French immigration to Puerto Rico
- German immigration to Puerto Rico
- Irish immigration to Puerto Rico
- Jewish immigration to Puerto Rico
- Spanish immigration to Puerto Rico
- Cultural diversity in Puerto Rico
- List of notable Puerto Ricans
- Royal Decree of Graces of 1815
- Corsican immigration to Venezuela
- Corsican people
- Corsican Americans
