= Casa Paoli =

Biographical museum in Ponce, Puerto Rico

- U.S. National Register of Historic Places
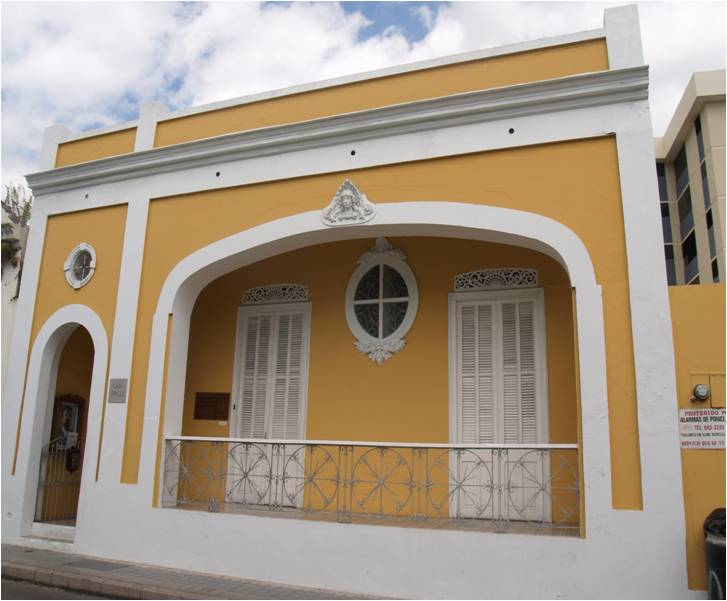
- Main facade, in July 2009

- Location within Puerto Rico
- Location: 14 Mayor Street (now, 2648 Mayor St. (Note: Note: This is the new address number of the location based on recent US Postal Service renumbering of lots in that area. The old #14 is still widely in use.)), Ponce, Puerto Rico
- Coordinates: 18°00′35″N 66°36′46″W
- Area: 1 acre (0.40 ha)
- Built: c. 1864
- Architect: Manuel V. Domenech (1914 intervention)
- Architectural style: Neoclassical
- NRHP reference No.: 09000769
- Added to NRHP: 1 October 2009

Museo Casa Paoli
- Established: 1987
- Location: Ponce, Puerto Rico
- Type: Biographical museum
- Director: Nestor Murray
- Owners: Private: Centro de Investigaciones Folklóricas de Puerto Rico, Inc.
- Website: Official site

Casa Paoli (English: Paoli House) is a historic house and biographical museum in barrio Cuarto, Ponce, Puerto Rico, in the Ponce Historic Zone. The house is significant as the birthplace of Antonio Paoli (1871–1946), a tenor who was the "first Puerto Rican to reach international recognition in the performing arts" and "one of the most outstanding opera singers of all times". The house was the childhood home of the artist and he was introduced to art and opera at this house during his formative years. In 1987, the house was turned into a museum to honor the career of Antonio Paoli. The building was listed on the U.S. National Register of Historic Places in 2009.

== History ==
The house had been a wedding gift for Paoli's parents, who married at the Ponce Cathedral after the birth of the first five of their eight children. Antonio, their seventh child, was born in the house, as were two of his siblings. The house is significant as it is the birthplace of one of the greatest opera singers of all times. It was the house Paoli occupied during his formative years. Just a few blocks from Teatro La Perla, Casa Paoli provided easy access for Paoli to Ponce's single most important theatrical arts venue. For his powerful and lyric voice, Antonio Paoli was considered the "King of the Tenors". As he sang for numerous kings around the world, Paoli is also known as the "Tenor of the Kings".

== Architecture ==
The front facade of the residence consists of eye-catching peach and white brick masonry and stucco front porch with a main arched balcony crowned by a female face. A second, smaller, arched entrance is the main entryway into the porch and house. Early 1900s ironworks gracefully separate the front porch from the front street sidewalk. The front doors of the house are wooden louvered characteristic of the middle-to-late 19th century. A circular front wall wind hole with decorative molding accentuates the porch; another smaller circular opening decorates high above the archway into the porch. The interior consists of nine rooms, a long, sunny, lateral hallway with multiple wooden veneer shutters, and an external cobble-stone foyer leading to the back courtyard.

The architectural style is described as Neoclassical, with other 20th century elements. The house was built as a wooden structure before 1864, when it was acquired by Domingo Paoli, the father of Antonio Paoli. By 1870, the house had been upgraded into a wood and brick masonry residence. In 1914 it was upgraded into the current brick and stucco structure by the prominent local architect and civil engineer Manuel V. Domenech.

== Antonio Paoli ==
Antonio Paoli was born in this house on 14 April 1871. From a young age, he would accompany his parents to opera performances at the Teatro La Perla, located some six blocks from this house. An inspiring performance there by the Italian tenor Pietro Baccei helped him decide what he wanted to be "when he grew up". His parents nurtured his ambition by enrolling him in a voice training school. However, when Antonio was just 12 years old his parents died. Paoli moved to Spain to live with his sister, Amalia, who was also a singer. Amalia also encouraged her younger brother to pursue his dream of becoming an opera singer.

After studying at the Royal Monastery of El Escorial in Madrid, Spain, and the Academia de Canto La Scala in Milan, Italy, Paoli made his debut in Paris. He went on to earn numerous honors and awards around the world and came to be affectionately known as both "The King of Tenors" and as "The Tenor of the Kings". He returned to Puerto Rico in 1917. Antonio and Amalia established a voice training school in San Juan. They also helped in theater productions at San Juan's Municipal Theater. In 1934, the San Juan Municipal Theater was renamed The Antonio Paoli Theater in his honor.

Paoli died on 24 August 1946, and was buried in the Puerto Rico Memorial Cemetery in Isla Verde. On 13 April 2005 his remains were exhumed and transferred to Ponce's Roman Baldorioty de Castro National Pantheon. Antonio Paoli is considered to be the first Puerto Rican to achieve international fame in the musical arts. The museum at Casa Paoli gives visitors insight into the fascinating life story and achievements of Puerto Rico's "Tenor of the Kings".

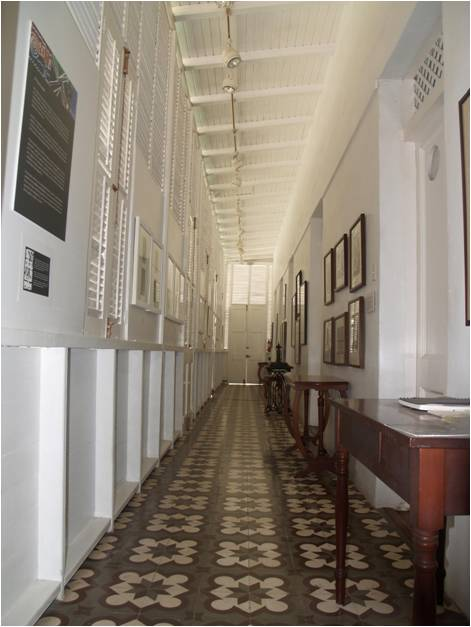
Interior gallery

== Museum and research center ==
Today Casa Paoli functions as a museum research center on Puerto Rican culture. The building is the headquarters of the Centro de Investigaciones Folkloricas de Puerto Rico (Puerto Rico Center for Folkloric Research). The Center's mission is to foster Puerto Rico's cultural traditions as well as popular arts. The Center purchased the property from Antonio Penna Salicrup and his family in 1987 to preserve the history of this lyrical singer and his family. Centro de Investigaciones Folkloricas de Puerto Rico used to be housed at Calle Marina street #27, at the Zaldo de Nebot Residence, but moved to Casa Paoli's around the spring or summer of 1987.

The museum consists of three exposition rooms where photographs, correspondence in the form of post cards, etc., and other memorabilia are displayed. Among the offerings of this museum is a shop displaying colorful papier-mâché masks used in Ponce's annual Carnival celebrations. The current museum exhibits documents and other memorabilia from the life of this well respected singer, along with examples of Puerto Rican art and a history of the city of Ponce.

== See also ==
- List of music museums
- Corsican immigration to Puerto Rico
- National Register of Historic Places listings in Ponce, Puerto Rico
