= Paoli, Inc. =

American furniture company

Paoli, LLC
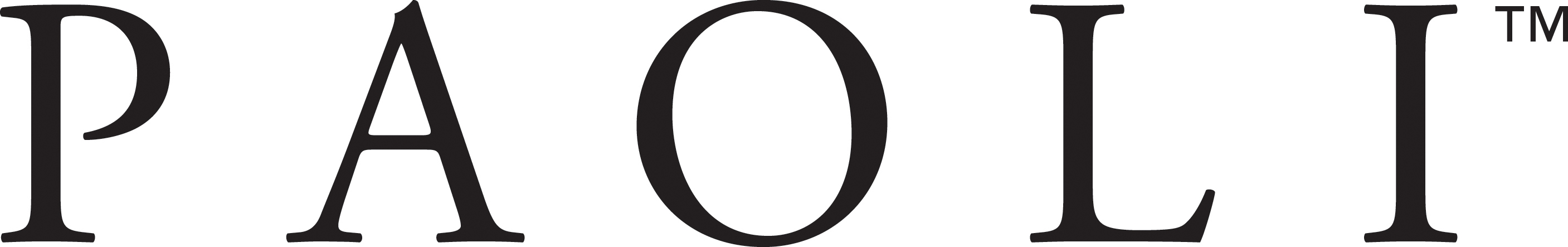
- Founded: (1926)
- Headquarters: Orleans, Indiana United States
- Key people: Mona Hoffman: President
- Products: Office furniture: seating, casegoods, occasional tables, conference tables, reception desks

Paoli, Incorporated is a manufacturer of wood office furniture. It was founded in 1926, and is located in Orleans, Indiana. As an operating company of HNI Corporation, Paoli’s sister companies are The HON Company, Allsteel, Gunlocke, Heatilator, Heat & Glo, and Quadra-Fire. The company has showrooms across the United States.

== History ==
Paoli, Inc. was first organized in July 1926 by Samuel Elsby, Sr. as a consolidation of the previous Orleans Cabinet Company and the Paoli Furniture Company. This new organization started out as the Paoli Chair Company and was located in Paoli, Indiana. The main products manufactured were footstools, vanity benches, and dining room suites complete with chairs.

When the Great Depression hit, Samuel J Elsby, Jr., who was then serving as the Secretary-Treasurer, suggested creating a line of occasional chairs targeted toward the consumer market. These occasional chairs were successful at the Chicago furniture market show. The company then began putting a focus on additional occasional chairs, which in turn, kept Paoli alive through the depression.

In 1951, Samuel Elsby, Jr., became president of Paoli Chair Company. By 1954, Paoli employed 300 people and became the largest manufacturer of occasional chairs in the world. Their success continued into the 1960s and led to two plant expansions. Soon after the expansion and modernization were complete, Samuel Elsby, Jr. died at age 60. His sons, Robert Elsby and Sam Elsby III stepped up to run the company. Not long after, the family sold the company to two investors named Joseph Wulfman and Sherman Heazlitt. Robert Elsby stayed with the company as President after it was sold, and ran the company until 1986.

By the end of the 1970s, Paoli made the switch from the residential chair market to the commercial furniture market. As Paoli contracted with other furniture manufacturers to produce desks, the company purchased property in neighboring Orleans, Indiana to build a warehouse to store the desks. In 1982, Paoli began making its own desk and case goods products at the new site in Orleans. Because of success in the commercial furniture market, Heazlitt and Wulfman adopted the new name Paoli, Inc.

Joseph Wulfman retired and sold his share of Paoli, Inc. to Sherman Heazlitt in 1986. Heazlitt became CEO and Thomas A. Talone became the 5th president of the company. Two years later, Heazlitt sold Paoli, Inc. to Klaussner Furniture Industries of Asheboro, North Carolina. Through the 1990s, the company expanded and moved all production and administration to a modern facility built in Orleans, Indiana. In 1999, Paoli, Inc. purchased Whitehall Furniture, an established manufacturer of quality seating.

In 2004, Paoli, Inc. was acquired by HNI Corporation, the second-largest office furniture manufacturer. From 2007 - 2009, Dave Gardner served as president. In January 2010, Brandon Sieben became president and served until December 2013 when he re-located to another position within the HNI Corporation. He is now the acting President of Allsteel, Inc. John Cahill is the current president of Paoli. On October 7, 2016 HNI Corporation announced consolidation of its manufacturing facilities, resulting in the closing and relocation of the Paoli plant in Orleans.

== Products ==
Paoli, Inc. provides contemporary, traditional, and transitional casegoods, along with management and guest seating for private offices. They also manufacture lounge seating for public spaces.
