= Olivia Paoli =

Puerto Rican suffragist

- Born: 1855; Ponce, Puerto Rico
- Died: 1942 (aged 86–87); Ponce, Puerto Rico
- Occupations: Suffragist, activist
- Spouse: Mario Braschi

Olivia Paoli (1855–1942) was a Puerto Rican suffragist and activist who fought for the rights of women in Puerto Rico.

== Biography ==
=== Early life ===
Paoli was born in Ponce, Puerto Rico in 1855. She was the sister of opera tenor Antonio Paoli and soprano Amalia Paoli.

=== Civic career ===
Paoli founded the first theosophist lodge in Puerto Rico on 31 December 1906. She was also the director of the magazine La Estrella de Oriente, which was dedicated to publishing the movement's philosophical, religious, and esoteric texts. In her work as an activist, Paoli was a contemporary of Ana Roque, Beatriz Lassalle, Carmen Gomez, and Isabel Andreu de Aguilar. She was also one of the architects of Puerto Rico's suffrage campaign from the 1920s, participating in the Social Suffragette League, of which she was vice president.

=== Family and later life ===
In 1875, Paoli married Mario Braschi, and they had nine children: Amalia, Selene, Julio, Estela, Mario, Aida, Poliuto, and the twins Angel and Angelino. Mario Braschi was a liberal journalist who suffered political persecution by the Spanish during the 1880s.

On 27 February 1942, Paoli died in the Sagrado Corazon Hospital in San Juan. She is buried in the Puerto Rico Memorial Cemetery located in Carolina, Puerto Rico. The local government of San Juan, Puerto Rico named a street "Calle Olivia Paoli" in her honor.

== Selected works ==
- Corona literaria a la memoria de Mario Braschi (1894)

== See also ==
- List of Puerto Ricans
- History of women in Puerto Rico
