= Antonio Paoli =

Puerto Rican opera singer

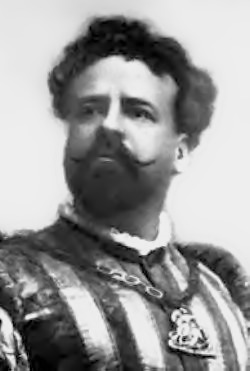
- Born: 14 April 1871; Ponce, Puerto Rico
- Died: 24 August 1946 (aged 75); San Juan, Puerto Rico
- Other names: "The King of Tenors" "The Tenor of Kings"
- Occupation: Opera singer (tenor)
- Years active: 1899–1917
- Awards: •Awarded The Cross of St. Mauricio medal by the Tsar of Russia Nicholas II (1904) •Declared Chamber Singer of the Court by the Queen of Spain Maria Cristina de Habsburgo (1904) •Knighted into the Order of Isabella the Catholic by the Queen of Spain (1904) •Knighted by the Prince of Portugal Carlos de Braganza as Highest Knight of the Christ of Portugal and Singer of the Royal Chamber (1904) •Declared Chamber Singer of the Court by the Emperor of Austria Franz Joseph (1906) •Decorated with the Cross of Alfonso II by the King of Spain Alfonso XIII (1909) •Declared Honor Singer of the Vatican by Pope Pius X (1909) •Honored with the title Favorite Son of Spain by the Spanish Crown (1910) •Named Singer of the Royal Court by the Kaiser William II of Germany(1911) •Honored with a protocol-breaking standing ovation by the Austro-Hungarian Emperor Franz Joseph (1912) •Knighted Knight of the Italian Crown and Commandant of the Roman People by the King of Italy Vittorio Emmanuelle III (1920) •Awarded a permanent pension by the Government of Puerto Rico for his fame and talent (1934) •The first operatic artist to record an entire opera when he participated in a performance of Pagliacci by Ruggiero Leoncavallo in Italy in 1907

"Vesti la giubba"
"Vesti la giubba" from Pagliacci, performed by Paoli in 1907

Antonio Paoli (14 April 1871 – 24 August 1946) was a Puerto Rican tenor. At the height of his fame, he was known as "The King of Tenors and The Tenor of Kings." He is considered to be the first Puerto Rican to reach international fame in the musical arts. Paoli has been recognized as "one of the most outstanding opera singers of all time," and as one who had "one of the most lyric and powerful voices...superior even to his contemporary rival, Enrico Caruso."

After spending his childhood in his birth city of Ponce, Paoli moved to Spain where, with the assistance of his well-connected sister Amalia, he obtained a royal scholarship to take singing lessons in Italy. After singing to standing ovation crowds in both Spain and Italy, Paoli made his grand debut in Paris, France, where he was encouraged to perform on the highest levels of the world stage. Before the end of the 19th century and while Paoli was still in his twenties, he went on a tour of Europe that earned him both popular acclaim, and imperial honors from princes, kings, and emperors.

Between 1900 and 1914 his career skyrocketed, with performances not only in Europe but also in the Americas, the Caribbean, Africa, and Asia. He performed in Moscow, Paris, London, Madrid, New York, Buenos Aires, Havana, Santiago, Milan, Rome, Naples, Barcelona, and Vienna.

When World War I forced the closure of all European opera houses, Paoli made his living as a professional boxer. He also lost his singing voice during this period. After the War ended, following medical advice and performing vocal exercises, Paoli regained his voice and returned to the international stage, in all the glory of days past. He performed in Europe, North and South America, and finally settled with his sister Amalia in San Juan, Puerto Rico, where she had opened a singing school.

Paoli spent the last 20 years of his life teaching voice and singing in San Juan, while also working for the establishment of a music conservatory in that city. He would not see this last dream come true, because he developed cancer and died at age 75. He was buried in San Juan, but his remains were later transferred to a mausoleum at Panteón Nacional Román Baldorioty de Castro in his birth city of Ponce.

== Early years ==
Paoli (birth name: Antonio Emilio Paoli y Marcano) was born in Ponce, Puerto Rico. He was the son of Amalia Marcano Intriago, of Spanish ancestry, who was born on the island of Margarita, Venezuela, and of Domingo Paoli Marcatentti, a Corsican immigrant. Antonio Paoli's parents met in Caracas, and immediately fell in love. But Amalia's father, a rich landlord, opposed their relationship because of class differences. The young couple escaped to the Dominican Republic without getting married and later returned to Puerto Rico. They established themselves in the city of Yauco and lived there for several years. Later they moved to Ponce, into a house given to them by Amalia's aunt, Teresa Intriago. It was located on Calle Mayor (Mayor Street), House No. 14. Paoli had two notable sisters, Olivia Paoli (1855–1942), who was a suffragist and Amalia Paoli (1861–1941), a notable opera soprano who together with her sister joined the Suffragist Social League and fought for the rights of Puerto Rican women.

Ponce at the time was the financial and cultural capital of the island, and an ideal place to Paoli's development.

When Paoli was young, his parents would often take him to operas at Ponce's La Perla Theater located a block from their residence. They saw a performance of Giuseppe Verdi's Il Trovatore, sung by Italian tenor, Pietro Baccei. At that moment, Paoli decided what he wanted to become. His parents were very supportive of his ambition and guided him on this route during his youth, enrolling him in a school of "voice" directed by Ramon Marin. His sister Amalia was a soprano who performed at La Perla in Emilio Arrieta's opera, Marina. In 1883, when Paoli was 12 years old, both his parents died. He traveled to Spain to live with his sister Amalia and study music and opera.

== Debut ==
Amalia was taking singing classes under Napoleon Verger. She was under the patronage of Isabel de Borbón, Princess of Asturias and sister of the King of Spain, Alfonso XII, In 1884, Amalia helped Paoli to obtain two scholarships from her Majesty Queen María Cristina, Queen Regent of Spain. Paoli started his studies at the Royal Monastery of El Escorial. He entered Toledo's Military Academy and in 1892 graduated with honors. He was assigned to the Queen's escort and named personal custodian and guard of the child King Alfonso XIII. Paoli wanted to continue singing and in 1897 went to study at the Academia de Canto La Scala in Milan, Italy. On 26 April 1899, he made his debut in Gioacchino Rossini's opera William Tell in Paris, France. Paris newspapers commented on Paoli's success and said, "We should declare Paoli the Tenor of France."

== World tours ==
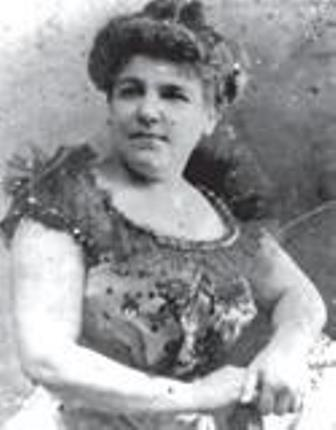
His sister Amalia Paoli, an opera soprano

Between 1900 and 1914, Paoli performed in Europe, America, Africa, and Asia. He performed in Italy, Luxembourg and in the United Kingdom, with performances in London, Scotland, Edinburgh, and Brighton, closing the year with concerts in Corsica (his father's homeland) and Turkey. In 1900, he married Josephine Vetiska, an Austrian, in Vienna.

From 1901 to 1902, Paoli performed in the following countries: Argentina, Brazil, Canada, Chile, Colombia, Cuba, Haiti, Puerto Rico, Venezuela and the United States. Paoli purchased a villa in Porto Cereso, Lugano, Italy, where his son Antonio Arnaldo was born. After singing for King Alfonso XII and the royal family in Spain, Paoli returned to the United States and sang in various cities, among them New York, Boston, Philadelphia, Albany, Providence, Grand Rapids, New London, Detroit, Cleveland, Indianapolis, Buffalo, Pittsburgh, Syracuse and Chicago.

In 1905, Paoli performed at the Grand Theatre du Conservatoire in Saint Petersburg, Russia. The Tsar of Russia Nicholas II was present during one of the performances. After inviting Paoli to perform at the royal Winter Palace, he awarded Paoli The Cross of St. Mauricio medal and bestowed upon him the title Cammer Sanger (Chamber Singer).

On 5 September 1907, Paoli held a private recital for Pope Pius X at the Sistine Chapel in the Vatican. That same year he was named as a "Singer of the Royal Court" by William II of Germany. Paoli was the first operatic artist to record an entire opera when he participated in a performance of Pagliacci by Ruggiero Leoncavallo in Milan, Italy. He was selected in 1907 as the First Tenor in the main character, by a team of engineers and musicians which included Leoncavallo. The recording was arranged in the following manner; the musicians were placed at the end of the recording room and the back-up singers in a semi-arc in front of the gramophone, while Paoli stood alone 20 feet (6.1 m) away from the gramophone.

Paoli continued to perform around the world: in Greece, Palestine, Poland, Egypt, Spain and Italy, where he established his permanent residence. In 1910, the singer was signed as the First Tenor by La Scala, Milan, the most prestigious opera company in the world at the time. Paoli received a contract to inaugurate Teatro Colón, in Buenos Aires, Argentina, where he sang Otello and Di quella pira. He also performed in Russia, Poland, Egypt, Hungary, Belgium, Cuba, Chile, Haiti, Colombia, Venezuela, Brazil, Canada, and the United States.

== Boxing career ==
By 1914, just before the start of World War I, Paoli lost his voice and all of the major opera houses in Europe were shut down. Paoli moved to Spain, a neutral country in the conflict, leaving his Italian properties unattended. By 1915, Paoli was without economic means as a result of his bad investments.

In order to make a living, Paoli became a professional boxer. After a period of training in Spain, he moved to England to start his new "career." He was undefeated in his first five fights. He broke his right wrist on his sixth challenge, which ended his boxing career.

Paoli sold his properties in Italy and acquired a small country house in Spain. He stayed for a few months with his brother Carlos in the Philippines. Paoli was medically treating his vocal cords, but observers believed that his opera career was over. He continued his singing exercises with his sister Amalia, who had moved into his house in Spain.

== Comeback ==
In January 1917, Paoli returned to the stage and performed the opera Samson and Delilah at the Constanzi Theater in Rome. Elvira de Hidalgo, who later became the singing coach of Maria Callas, recalled:

"No one suspected that Paoli was coming back to the stage; we all knew that he had lost his voice. People were there to see him fail; I saw some guys with tomatoes and rotten eggs, ready to throw them as soon as Paoli made his first mistake. But when he came out singing his initial aria, the public went crazy and stood up in a standing ovation. Paoli's voice sounded like one of those trumpets that you expect to hear in the day of the final judgment. His debut was tremendous. He had to repeat twice every single aria that he performed that night, because the public furiously demanded it. He performed for seven consecutive nights with the theater at its maximum capacity. I attended every single function. Every night he sang better than the night before. I always dreamed to sing with Paoli, but I don't think my voice was good or strong enough to sing with him. I think he was the greatest tenor ever."

Paoli kept busy performing in Italy, South America, and the United States. He returned to Puerto Rico in 1923. At the time, his sister Amalia Paoli was residing in San Juan (in the ward of Santurce) where she was running a singing school (Academia Paoli). Antonio conducted a few performances around the island and departed to sing at the Brooklyn Academy of Music, the Manhattan Opera House and the Metropolitan Opera House in Philadelphia. He had wanted to sing in the Metropolitan Opera House in New York, but apparently his competitor Enrico Caruso opposed this. Some note that Caruso was a shareholder of the renowned opera house. From the U.S., the tenor would visit Curaçao, Cuba, Colombia, Haiti and Ecuador.

== Last years ==
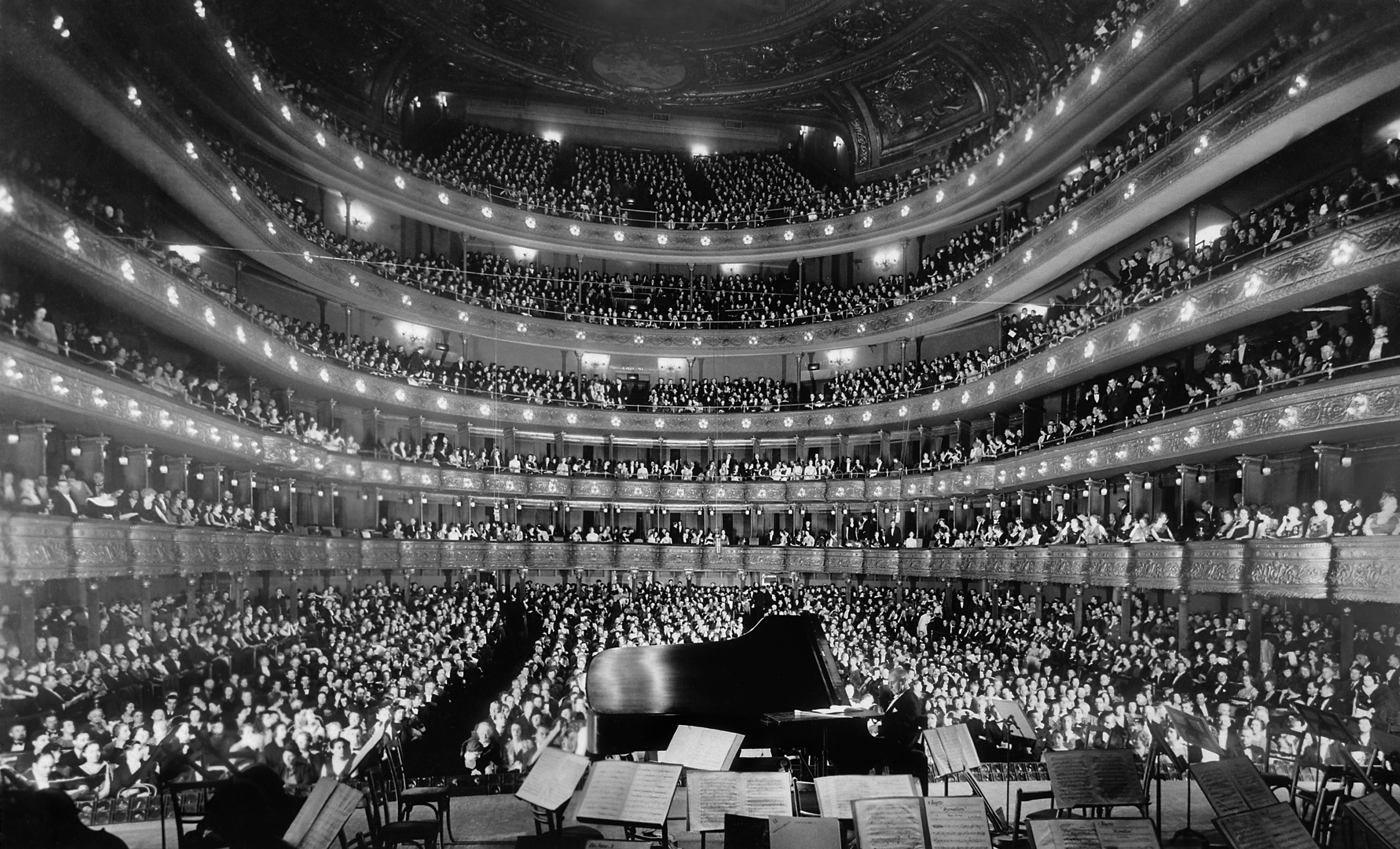
Competitor Caruso who was shareholder at the old New York City Metropolitan Opera House ("The Old Met") made sure Paoli was not allowed to sing at the Met.

Even with this busy agenda, Paoli's financial situation remained strained. After living in New York City for almost the entire year of 1927, Paoli decided to return to Puerto Rico to live and work with his sister Amalia, and give voice lessons at the Academia Paoli. Paoli also helped produce Othello at the Municipal Theater in San Juan.

For the next two decades Paoli's main concern was teaching at the Paoli Academy with Amalia. In 1928, the tenor performed Verdi's Otello in its entirety for the last time in San Juan. This was his last performance on stage. It took place at the San Juan Municipal Theater, known today as the Tapia Theater.

In 1935, the government of Puerto Rico named the San Juan Municipal Theater in his honor, changing its name to Teatro Paoli. In 1929, his wife Josephine died and a year later he married Adelaida Bonini, from Rimini, Italy. He affectionately called her "Adina". He gave his last singing performance in 1942, while commemorating the one-year anniversary of the death of his sister, Amalia Paoli. The service was conducted at the Chapel of the University of the Sacred Heart (Santurce).

Paoli died of prostate cancer, in San Juan on 24 August 1946, and was buried in the Puerto Rico Memorial Cemetery in Carolina, Puerto Rico. On 13 April 2005, Paoli's remains, and those of his (second) wife Adina Bonini (who had died in May 1978) were exhumed and reinterred in Ponce's Román Baldorioty de Castro National Pantheon and buried by the base of his statue. The bust of Paoli at the Pantheon's rotunda is the work of Puerto Rican sculptor Gladys Nieves.

== Honors, accolades, and legacy ==
Antonio Paoli was the first Puerto Rican to gain international recognition in the performing arts. He gave 1,725 performances between 1888 and 1942, and interpreted Verdi's Otello 575 times. To his credit, Paoli was also the first opera singer in the world to record an entire opera; he was part of a recorded performance of Pagliacci by Ruggiero Leoncavallo in Italy in 1907.

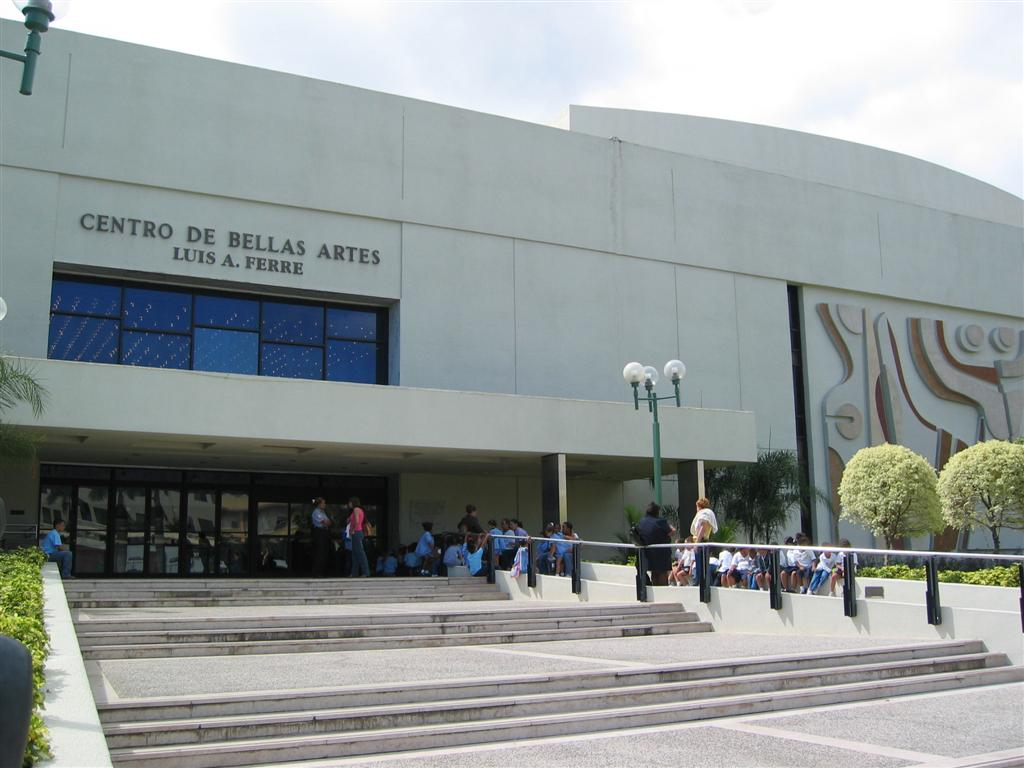
Centro de Bellas Artes in San Juan has a hall named in Paoli's memory.

As early as 1904, Paoli was awarded The Cross of St. Mauricio medal by the Tsar of Russia Nicholas II, and María Cristina de Habsburgo, Queen of Spain, declared Paoli Cantante de Cámara de la Corte (Chamber Singer of the Court) and gave him La Gran Cruz de Isabel la Católica (The Cross of Isabella the Catholic), while Carlos de Braganza, Prince of Portugal, named him Caballero Comendador del Cristo de Portugal y Cantante de Cámara. Just two years later, in 1906, the same title of Cammer Sanger (Chamber Singer of the Court) was given to Paoli by Franz Joseph, Emperor of Austria, and in 1907 he was decorated by Carlos I of Braganza.

In 1909, Paoli received La Cruz de Alfonso II from Alfonso XIII, King of Spain, and was declared ’'Honor Singer of the Vatican'’ by Pope Pius X. In 1910, he was honored with the title of Hijo Predilecto de España (Favorite Son of Spain), while in 1911, Wilhelm II, Kaiser of Germany, declared Paoli ’'Kammer Sanger of the Empire'’, and in 1912, Paoli received a protocol-breaking standing ovation from the Austro-Hungarian Emperor Franz Joseph when Paoli sang Lohengrin in Vienna. In 1920, the tenor was knighted by Vittorio Emmanuelle III, King of Italy, making him Cavaliere De La Corona Italiana and Commendatore Dell Popolo Romano (Knight of the Italian Crown and Commandant of the Roman People).

Though he did not see it happen during his lifetime, Puerto Rico also built the Music Conservatory, something for which Paoli had worked so hard to establish. This dream was finally realized shortly after his death. At the "Centro de Bellas Artes" in San Juan there is also a 1,883-seat "Antonio Paoli Festival Hall." San Juan's Municipal Theater was also renamed Teatro Paoli in his honor in 1935. In recognition of his fame and talent, the government of Puerto Rico also awarded Paoli a pension in 1934.

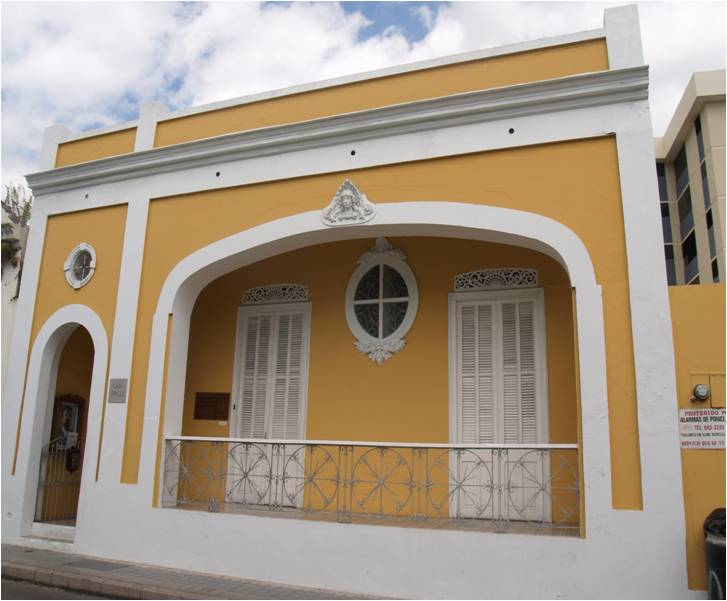
Casa Paoli, the childhood home of Antonio Paoli in Ponce

In 1983, the non-profit "Paoli Award" was created. This award honors the effort, work, and success of outstanding professionals in the various arts and media, including music and recording, television, radio, written communication, fashion, and beauty. Originally designated to recognize the outstanding achievements of Puerto Ricans, the Paoli Award has branched out internationally, and since 1992 it also includes Hispanics and Latin Americans from around the world.

On 9 October 2009, the Government of the United States listed Casa Paoli in Antonio Paoli's hometown of Ponce, Puerto Rico, in the U.S. National Register of Historic Places. The house, Antonio's childhood house in Puerto Rico, is Paoli's only remaining residencial structure in Puerto Rico.

Among other honors bestowed on Paoli after his death are a music school named in his honor ("Escuela Libre de Música Antonio Paoli"), in the city of Caguas, Puerto Rico, and in his hometown of Ponce, there is a theater at the Interamerican University of Puerto Rico, Ponce named in his memory, Teatro Paoli.

Paoli has also been the subject of many books written about his life and influence. Included is the work by Emilio J. Pasarell titled "Orígenes y desarrollo de la afición teatral en Puerto Rico" (Origins and development of the theatrical pursuit in Puerto Rico) where he describes the life of Paoli in detail.

== Discography ==
External audio
- You may listen to Antonio Paoli's "Di quella pira" here on YouTube

The following are part of Antonio Paoli's discography:

- Antonio Paoli. (2000)
- Great Voices. (1999)
- Antonio Paoli in arias from Otello. (1998)
- Leoncavallo: Pagliacci. (1996)
- Serie Artistas Célebres No. 1: Edición del Centenario del Tenor Antonio Paoli. Instituto de Cultura Puertorriqueña (1971)

== See also ==
- List of Puerto Ricans
- Corsican immigration to Puerto Rico
- Casa Paoli
