= Francisco Matos Paoli =

Puerto Rican writer and independence advocate

- Secretary General of the Puerto Rican Nationalist Party
- Born: March 9, 1915; Lares, Puerto Rico
- Died: July 10, 2000 (aged 85); Hato Rey, Puerto Rico
- Political party: Puerto Rican Nationalist Party
- Movement: Puerto Rican Independence
- Spouse: Isabel Freire de Matos

Francisco Matos Paoli (March 9, 1915 – July 10, 2000), was a Puerto Rican poet, critic, and essayist who in 1977 was nominated for the Nobel Prize in Literature. His books were rooted in three major literary movements in Latin America: Romanticism, Modernism, and Postmodernism.

Paoli was also a Secretary General of the Puerto Rican Nationalist Party and a Puerto Rican patriot. In 1950 he was imprisoned for having a Puerto Rican flag in his home, and for speaking on behalf of Puerto Rico's independence.

== Early years ==
Matos Paoli was one of nine siblings born and raised on the family farm in the town of Lares, a town which is historically known for El Grito de Lares, Puerto Rico's first rebellion for independence.

His mother, Susana Paoli Gayá, died in 1930 when he was 15 years old. The death of his mother compelled him to write his first collection of poems, titled Signario de Lágrimas, which was published in 1931.

Matos Paoli received his primary and secondary education in his hometown. In high school he dedicated most of his time to reading classical literature. It was during his youth that he met Pedro Albizu Campos and became inspired to join the Puerto Rican Nationalist Party in its struggle for Puerto Rico's independence.

In 1933, Matos Paoli met fourteen-year-old Lolita Lebrón, during the celebration of her baptism into the Catholic faith. Soon, Matos Paoli became Lebron's first boyfriend and they would often write letters to each other where they exchanged the poetry that they wrote. Matos Paolí's family opposed their relationship because they considered Lebrón a jíbara (peasant). Her father also opposed this relationship and ordered her to stop writing to Paoli. However, they both continued to write to each other until he moved to San Juan to continue his education.

Matos Paoli enrolled at the Polytechnical School of the University of Puerto Rico and earned his bachelor's degree in education with a major in Spanish. Lebrón, who became a nationalist herself and led the 1954 attack against the United States House of Representatives, moved to San Juan, where she studied sewing and continued her romantic relationship with Matos Paoli. The relationship ended when Matos Paoli continued his postgraduate studies in the UPR and moved to Paris, France, for a year to study comparative literature at the Sorbonne. In 1937, he published his second collection of poems titled Cardo Labriego. During this time he met Isabel Freire Meléndez, a fellow independence advocate who in 1942 became his wife. After he earned his master's degree in Spanish literature, he returned to Puerto Rico and in 1943 began a professorship in the Humanities Department of his alma mater, the University of Puerto Rico. He also became involved in spiritualism and founded a spiritualist center called Luz y Progreso (Light and Progress).

== Nationalist and poet ==
Paoli's political activities and beliefs influenced his literary work. On May 21, 1948, a bill was introduced before the Puerto Rican Senate which would restrain the rights of the independence and nationalist movements on the archipelago. The Senate, which at the time was controlled by the Partido Popular Democrático (PPD) and presided by Luis Muñoz Marín, approved the bill. This bill, which resembled the anti-communist Smith Act passed in the United States in 1940, became known as the Ley de la Mordaza (Gag Law, technically "Law 53 of 1948") when the U.S.-appointed governor of Puerto Rico, Jesús T. Piñero, signed it into law on June 10, 1948. Under this new law it became a crime to print, publish, sell, or exhibit any material intended to paralyze or destroy the insular government; or to organize any society, group or assembly of people with a similar destructive intent. It made it illegal to sing a patriotic song, and reinforced the 1898 law that had made it illegal to display the Flag of Puerto Rico, with anyone found guilty of disobeying the law in any way being subject to a sentence of up to ten years imprisonment, a fine of up to US$10,000 (equivalent to $134,000 in 2025), or both, for each offence. According to Dr. Leopoldo Figueroa, a non-PPD member of the Puerto Rico House of Representatives, the law was repressive and was in violation of the First Amendment of the US Constitution which guarantees Freedom of Speech. He pointed out that the law as such was a violation of the civil rights of the people of Puerto Rico. In 1949, the Nationalist Party held an assembly in the town of Arecibo and named Paoli Secretary General of the party. Some of his duties as Secretary General of the party included the presentation of patriotic speeches. Due to the Gag Law, these duties placed Paoli on a collision course with the U.S. government.

In September 1950, Paoli traveled to the towns of Cabo Rojo, Santurce, Guánica and Lares, where he participated in Nationalist activities. On October 30, the Nationalists staged uprisings in the towns of Ponce, Mayagüez, Naranjito, Arecibo, Utuado (Utuado Uprising), San Juan (San Juan Nationalist revolt), and Jayuya (Jayuya Uprising). On November 2, 1950, the police arrived at Paoli's home in Río Piedras and searched for guns and explosives. The only thing they found was a Puerto Rican flag but, due to the Gag Law, this enabled them to arrest and accuse Paoli of treason against the United States. The evidence used against him was the Puerto Rican flag in his home, and four speeches he'd made in favor of Puerto Rican independence.

On the basis of this "evidence" Paoli was fired from his professorship at the University of Puerto Rico, and sentenced to a twenty-year prison term, which was later reduced to ten years. In jail, he shared his cell with Pedro Albizu Campos. Campos suffered from ulcerations on his legs and body caused by radiation, and Paoli tended to his needs.

== Political prisoner ==
While in prison, Paoli edited a newspaper which included news of political prisoners, poems, patriotic songs and drawings. During his confinement he suffered from hallucinations which resulted in a mental breakdown and he was sent to a psychiatric hospital. After his recovery, he wrote Canto a Puerto Rico (I Sing to Puerto Rico), and resumed his involvement with spiritual mysticism and Christianity.

In 1951, he published a collection of poems in a book titled Luz de los Héroes (The Light of Heroes), which spoke about the Puerto Rican independence movement. Paoli's poetry also covered other aspects of human existence such as religion, mystic and spiritual experiences, love, death, solitude, social justice, suffering, freedom, the landscape, and his fellow Puerto Ricans.

Paoli was released on probation on January 16, 1952.

== Nationalists attack the U.S. House of Representatives ==
On March 1, 1954 Lolita Lebrón, together with three other members of the Nationalist Party, entered the visitor's gallery above the chamber in the House of Representatives in Washington, D.C. Lebron stood up and shouted "¡Viva Puerto Rico Libre!" ("Long Live a Free Puerto Rico!") and unfurled the flag of Puerto Rico. Subsequently, the group opened fire with semi-automatic pistols. The U.S. government ordered the wholesale arrest of Nationalist Party members including Paoli, who was not involved in the incident. Upon his incarceration in Rio Piedras prison without any visitor's privileges, Paoli initiated a hunger strike. On May 26, 1955, after ten months in jail and in poor health, Paoli was finally pardoned by Puerto Rican Governor Luis Muñoz Marín.

== Written works ==
Paoli was named resident poet of University of Puerto Rico and served as lecturer. In 1977, the Department of Hispanic Studies at the UPR campus in Mayagüez nominated him for the Nobel Prize in literature in recognition of his substantial contribution to world literature. His critics consider his books rooted in three major literary movements in Latin America: Romanticism, Modernism, and Postmodernism. Amongst his published works are the following:

- Canto a Puerto Rico (1952) "I Sing to Puerto Rico"
- Luz de los Héroes (1954) "Light of Heroes"
- Criatura de Rocío (1958) "Creature of Mist"
- Canto a la Locura (1962) "Song to the Madness"
- El Viento y la Paloma (1969) "The Wind and the Pigeon"
- Cancionera (1970) "Song Book"
- La Marea Sube (1971) "The Rising Tide"
- Cancionero II (1972) "Song Book Pt.2"
- Rostro en la Estrella (1973) "A Face in the Star"
- Isla para los Niños (1981) "Island for Children"
- Hacia el Hondo Vuelo (1983) "Towards the Deep Flight"
- Decimario de la Virgen (1990) "A Vigil for the Virgin"

== Later years ==
Paoli and Lebron remained lifelong friends and he wrote the foreword to one of her books of poems. In July 1982, Paoli was selected as one of fifty poets to attend the Sixth World Congress of Poets held in Madrid, Spain. He also attended, by invitation, the eighth World Congress of Poets in Athens, Greece in 1985. Among the magazines which published his essays were Asomante, Puerto Rico Ilustrado, and Alma Latina. In 1989, the Manati Foundation of Art and Culture of the town of Manatí, dedicated their annual Juegos Florales (Poetry Pageants) to Paoli.

Paoli lived with his wife Isabel Freire de Matos (1915–2004), herself an educator and journalist, in San Juan. He became ill and was hospitalized at the Hospital del Maestro in Hato Rey, where he died on July 10, 2000.

== See also ==
- Puerto Rican Nationalist Party Revolts of the 1950s
- List of Puerto Rican writers
- List of Puerto Ricans
- Puerto Rican literature
