= Cesare Paoli =

Italian archivist, palaeographer, diplomatist and historian (1840–1902)

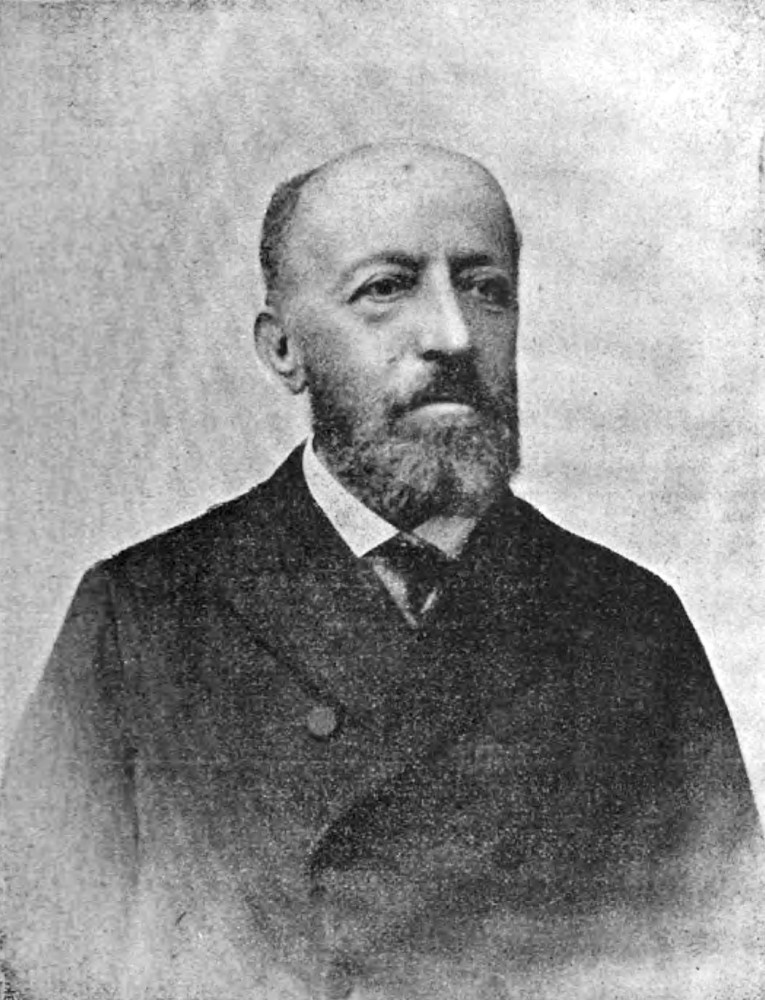
Cesare Paoli (1840–1902)

Cesare Paoli (1840 – 1902) was an Italian historian and paleographer, was the son of senator Baldassare Paoli. He was born and educated in Florence where at 21, he was given an appointment in the record office. From 1865 to 1871, he was attached to the archives of Siena, but eventually returned to Florence. In 1874, he was appointed first professor of palaeography and diplomatics at the Istituto di Studii Superiori in Florence, where he continued to work at the interpretation of manuscripts. In 1887, he became editor of the Archivio storico italiano, contributing numerous articles. His works consist of many historical essays, studies on palaeography, transcriptions of state and other papers, reviews, etc.
