= Casa Franceschi Antongiorgi =

Historic house in Yauco, Puerto Rico

- U.S. National Register of Historic Places
- Puerto Rico Historic Sites and Zones
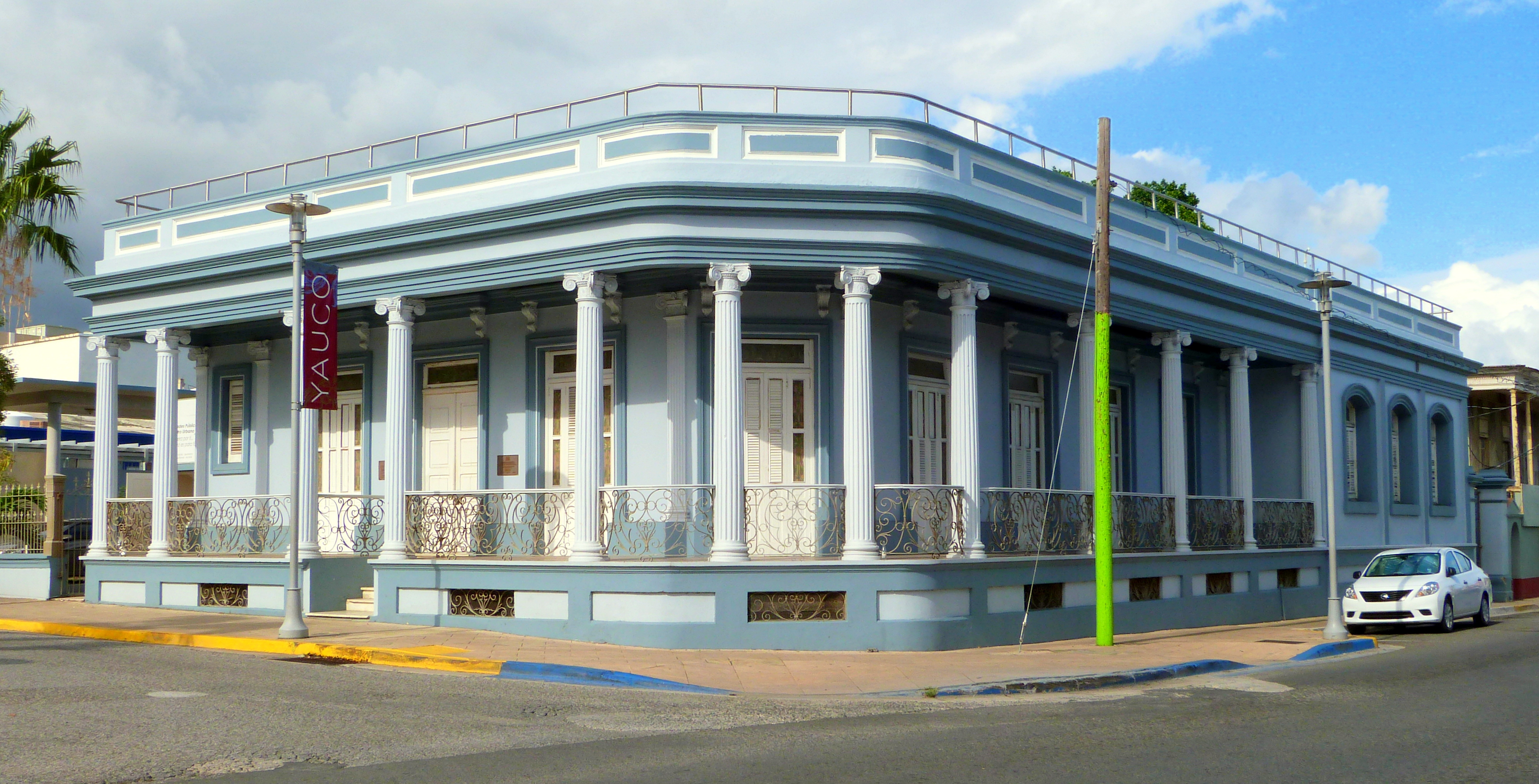
- Casa Antongiorgi (2017)

- Location within Puerto Rico
- Location: 25 de Julio St., Yauco, Puerto Rico
- Coordinates: 18°02′09″N 66°50′57″W
- Area: 0.3 acres (0.12 ha)
- Built: 1907-10
- Architect: André Troublard
- Architectural style: Beaux Arts
- NRHP reference No.: 85000113
- RNSZH No.: 2001-(RS)-23-JP-SH

Significant dates
- Added to NRHP: January 16, 1985
- Designated RNSZH: May 16, 2001

The Casa Franceschi Antongiorgi (Franceschi Antongiorgi House), located at 25 de Julio St. in Yauco, Puerto Rico, is a house listed on the National Register of Historic Places in 1985. It has also been known as Casa Fleming.

The house was built in 1907-1910 by the French architect André Troublard for Alejandro Franceschi Antongiorgi, a rich landowner and lover of the arts. Antongiorgi frequently held banquets, concerts and meetings with visiting artists in his house.

It is Beaux Arts in style and has Classical Revival details. Architect André Troublard also designed the Logia Masónica Hijos de la Luz, also in Yauco and listed on the National Register.
