= Jean Paoli =

French computer scientist

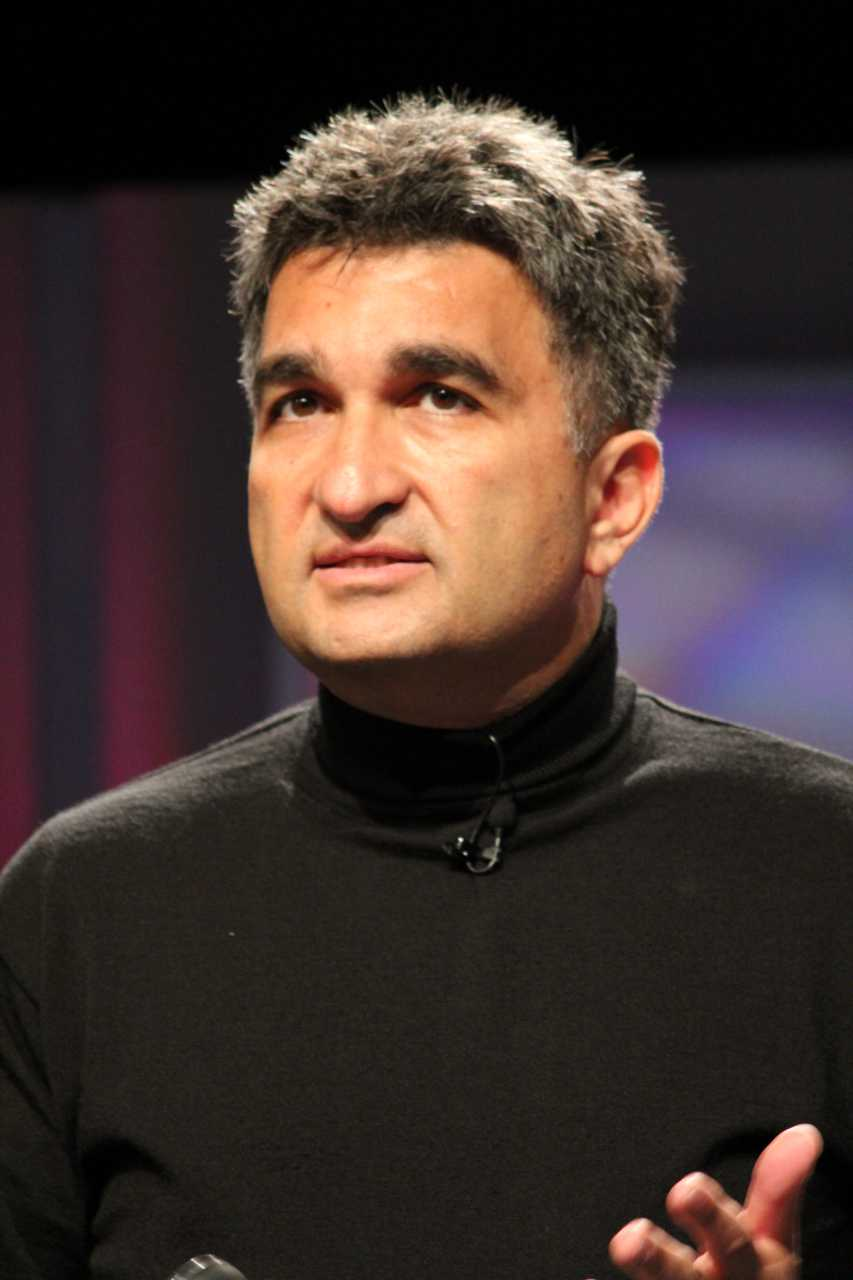
Jean Paoli at the 2010 O'Reilly Open Source Convention

Jean Paoli is one of the inventors of XML. Along with Tim Bray and C. Michael Sperberg-McQueen, Paoli co-edited the XML 1.0 recommendation for the World Wide Web Consortium starting in 1997 and until at least 2008.

Paoli was born in Beirut, Lebanon. Before joining Microsoft, Paoli had spent 10 years developing various startup companies at INRIA, the renowned French institute for research in computer science. He moved from Paris to join Microsoft in 1996, where he worked on the Channel Definition Format for Internet Explorer 4.0, advocated for the original Microsoft Office XML formats, and promoted Office Open XML.

Along with Adriana Neagu and others he was a co-inventor of InfoPath and is named on its patented way of authoring XML using DHTML views and XSLT.

Paoli was the president of Microsoft Open Technologies until 2017. He departed Microsoft in late 2017 to create the startup Docugami, Inc. which focuses on productivity, machine learning, semi-structured data and documents.
