= Amalia Paoli =

Puerto Rican operatic soprano

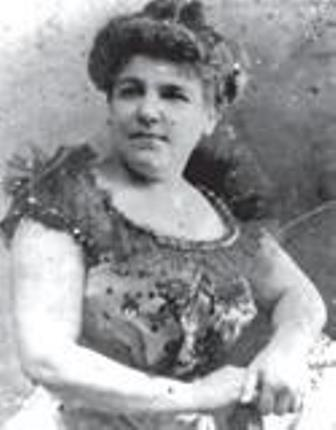

Background information
- Born: c. 1861; Ponce, Captaincy General of Puerto Rico
- Died: 1941 Ponce, Puerto Rico
- Occupation: Soprano singer

Amalia Paoli y Marcano (c. 1861–1941) was a Puerto Rican soprano. She was the sister of tenor Antonio Paoli and of Olivia Paoli, a suffragist and activist who fought for the rights of women.

== First years ==
Amalia Paoli was born in Ponce, Puerto Rico. She was the daughter of Domingo Paoli Marcatentti, born in Corsica, and Amalia Marcano Intriago, who was originally from Pampatar, Isla Margarita in Venezuela. Amalia Paoli's parents met in Caracas, and immediately fell in love; however, Amalia's father, a rich landlord, was opposed to the relationship because of class differences, therefore the young couple escaped to the Dominican Republic without getting married and later returned to Puerto Rico. The couple established themselves in the city of Yauco, but later moved into a house, given to them by Amalia's aunt, Teresa Intriago, located at one of the main arteries in the city of Ponce's urban core, Calle Mayor (Mayor Street), House No. 14. Ponce at the time was the financial and cultural capital of the island, thereby the ideal place for the initial cultural development of Paoli. In fact, his parents would often take her to operas at Ponce's Teatro La Perla located a block away from Paoli's residence.

== Debut ==
Paoli first broke into the public eye with performances at Teatro La Perla. In 1880, when only 19 years old, she performed at La Perla in Emilio Arrieta's opera Marina.

== Move to Europe ==
Paoli succeeded in catching the eye of what historian and Puerto Rico state historic preservation officer Juan Llanes Santos described as "well-connected people", who moved the young woman to Spain in 1883, where she auditioned for Isabel de Borbon. The sister of the King and Princess of Asturias, Isabel provided her patronage to Paoli, securing singing lessons for her from Napoleon Verger who was, according to Santos, "the most famous singing teacher at the time in Madrid, Napoleon Verger." Paoli immediately brought her younger siblings to live with her, and, in 1896, with the assistance of the royal family, secured a royal scholarship for her brother Antonio that would turn him into a world-renowned tenor.

== Later years and death ==
In the early 1920s, Paoli moved back to Puerto Rico where she founded a music school in Santurce called the Academia Paoli. There, she joined her sister in the Suffragist Social League; she and her sister were among a number of renowned women artists to do so.

Paoli died in 1941. She was buried at the Puerto Rico Memorial Cemetery in Carolina, Puerto Rico.

== Legacy ==
Paoli is recognized in Ponce at the Park of the Illustrious Ponce Citizens, and a street was named after her in Toa Baja, Puerto Rico.

== See also ==
- List of Puerto Ricans
- History of women in Puerto Rico
