= Lorenzo Paoli =

Italian footballer

Personal information
- Full name: Lorenzo Paoli
- Date of birth: February 17, 1988 (age 38)
- Place of birth: Urbino, Italy
- Height: 1.80 m (5 ft 11 in)
- Position: Midfielder

Team information
- Current team: Pineto

Senior career*
Years	Team	Apps	(Gls)
2007–2008	San Marino Calcio	9	(0)
2008	Real Montecchio	15	(0)
2009–2013	Vis Pesaro	129	(9)
2013–2016	Ancona	65	(3)
2016–2020	Vis Pesaro	123	(3)
2020–	Pineto	0	(0)
- * Club domestic league appearances and goals as of 22 February 2020

Lorenzo Paoli (born 17 February 1988 in Urbino) is an Italian footballer who plays as a midfielder for Serie D club Pineto.

== Club career ==
Paoli signed his first professional footballing contract with Serie C2 club San Marino Calcio, and made his first appearance in a league match against Gubbio on 7 October 2007.

On 13 July 2020 he moved to Serie D club Pineto.
