= Roger Dawson =

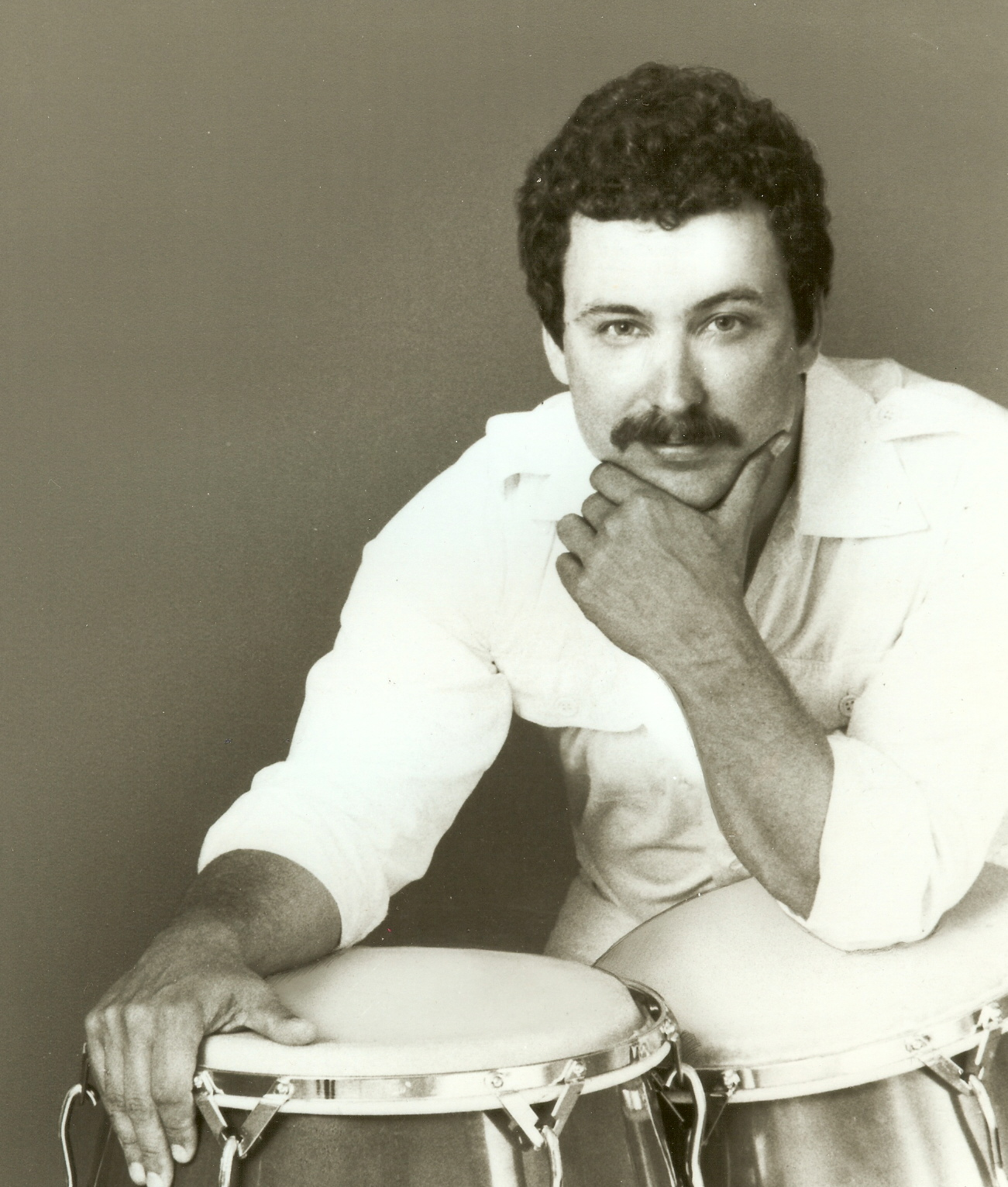
- Roger Dawson 1976

Background information
- Birth name: Roger Ward Dawson
- Born: March 19, 1940
- Origin: St. Louis, Missouri, USA
- Genres: Mainstream jazz Post-bop; Avant-garde jazz Free jazz Latin jazz Salsa music
- Occupation(s): Conga player, Jazz percussionist, Jazz composer, Bandleader, Disc jockey, Broadcast executive
- Instrument(s): Conga, Percussion
- Years active: 1961–1985

Roger Dawson (born March 19, 1940) is a jazz percussionist, conga drummer, bandleader, and jazz composer. He was a leading jazz and salsa disc jockey in the US and was acknowledged as being at the forefront of New York's salsa music explosion of the seventies and early eighties. He was the creator of the long-running "Salsa Meets Jazz" concert series at New York's Village Gate club.

== Early life ==
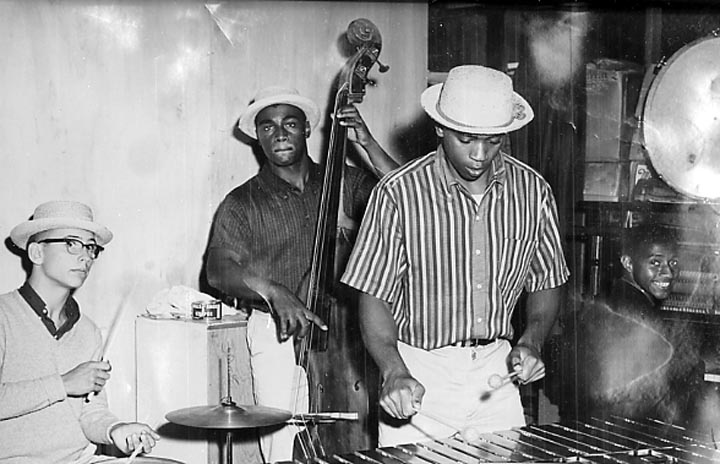
The Jazz Monitors 1957

At fourteen, he was influenced by the jazz and Latin music radio shows of Gene Norman over KFI and Chico Sesma, respectively, on radio station KALI. Roger recalls going to Gene Norman's concerts at the Pasadena Civic Auditorium to see Erroll Garner, Miles Davis with John Coltrane, and the "West Coast jazz" sounds of Howard Rumsey's Lighthouse All Stars, Shorty Rogers and the Giants, Gerry Mulligan, and the Chet Baker Quartet. Gene Norman also owned "The Crescendo" jazz club on the Sunset Strip in Hollywood, where on his fourteenth birthday Roger met vibraphonist Cal Tjader and the great Cuban conguero Armando Peraza, who so impressed Roger that he pleaded for Peraza to begin teaching him Afro-Cuban conga drum technique.

Dawson transferred to John Muir High School in Pasadena, California, where he met fellow students Vibraphonist Bobby Hutcherson, Bassist Herbie Lewis, and pianist Nat Brown. With Roger on drums, they formed a quartet called "The Jazz Monitors" and performed at venues in the Los Angeles area until they graduated from John Muir in 1958.

== Early radio career ==
Following high school, Dawson served in the U.S. Army and was an announcer for the Armed Forces radio network in Europe. On leave in Amsterdam, Roger ran into Bob Whitlock, the original bassist for the Gerry Mulligan Quartet, who had received a scholarship to the Sorbonne in Paris. Bob and Roger travelled to Paris, where Bob brought Dawson to the Blue Note Jazz Club, where they performed with bebop pianist Bud Powell.

Leaving the service in 1961, Dawson returned to California and the La Jolla/San Diego area, where he went to work for jazz radio station KFMX as a deejay and account executive. In 1963, Roger became the General Manager of San Diego radio station KJLM, which he changed to a 24-hour "straight ahead" jazz format, changing the call letters to KDIG, and won the Billboard Jazz Station award in June 1965.

== Jazz and salsa musician ==
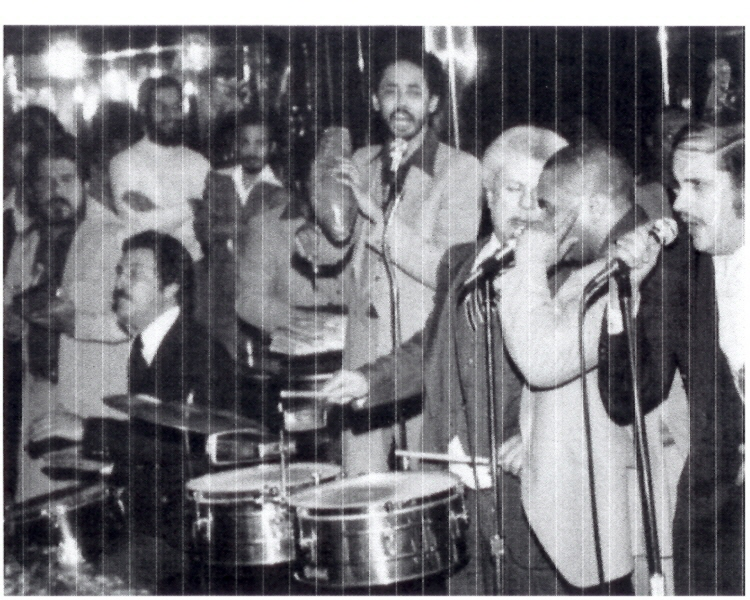
Roger Dawson with Tito Puente at the Corso Club, New York City, 1976

In November 1966, after a conversation with John Coltrane at the "It Club" in Los Angeles in 1965, Dawson gave up his General Manager radio position and went to New York to play jazz, joining his high school pals Herbie Lewis and Bobby Hutcherson who had moved to New York while he had been in the service. He lived on Harlem's Sugar Hill and pursued his studies of the conga drum and Afro Cuban percussion with Jose Valiente, Carlos Valdes (Patato), Jose Mangual, Frankie Malabe and Milton Cardona. He joined Frankie Dante's Orquesta Flamboyan Salsa group on congas and performed with many of the top salsa bands from Tito Puente (see photo). Machito, Típica 73, Fajardo, Orquesta Broadway, Angel Canales, Dave Valentin, Joe Cuba, Cortijo just to name a few. He co-composed the salsa tune "Iguales" with Rubén Blades that was recorded by Orquesta Guarere.

Dawson continued to be active with respect to his jazz roots performing with jazz pianist Ahmad Jamal, Ray Nance, the Gil Evans Orchestra, McCoy Tyner, Roy Haynes, Hannibal Marvin Peterson, Kenny Barron, Billy Harper, Cedar Walton, Herbie Lewis, Freddie Hubbard, Bobby Hutcherson, Sam Rivers, Rashied Ali, Rahsaan Roland Kirk, Hilton Ruiz with George Coleman and toured with jazz saxophonist Archie Shepp in several of Archie's avant-garde bands that featured such players as Jimmy Garrison, Beaver Harris, Dave Burrell, Grachan Moncur III, Walter Davis Jr., Art Taylor, Hilton Ruiz, John Betsch and Santi Debriano; recording with Carla Bley and the Jazz Composers' Orchestra (the epic Escalator over the Hill) with Don Cherry, Charlie Haden, Gato Barbieri, Paul Motian and many others.

== Development of an original conga style ==
Having started his musical training as a post-bop trap player upon arriving in New York in 1965, Dawson combined authentic Afro-Cuban technique, which he had learned from his studies with Patato Valdes, Armando Peraza, Frankie Malabe, Milton Cardona, Tommy Lopez, and others, into the jazz idioms of the 1960s and 1970s, including the Free Jazz Avant Garde movement started in early 1960s Los Angeles by Ornette Coleman.

The now defunct Slug's, located on East 3rd Street, was the Mecca for these New York avant-garde musicians, and Dawson's long association with Archie Shepp's band at Slug's, together with drummer Beaver Harris aggressive high-energy percussive forays, took the band into exploration of improvised non-traditional "rolling" or "rubato" tempos that could surge or recede based upon interaction with the improvisation of the other players. This led Roger to pursue further experimental "free" playing with Sam Rivers, The Jazz Composers Orchestra, and the Ted Danial Energy Big Band, which performed weekly at Rashied Ali's SoHo Jazz Club, "Ali's Alley," during the late 1970's.

Dawson adapted non-traditional tempos such as 7/4 and 9/4, creating patterns incorporating the elements of authentic Afro-Cuban conga technique into these non-traditional rhythms. He utilized mixtures of 4/4, 6/8, 12/8, 7/4 and 9/4 in many of his own compositions with his own group and with close friend Hilton Ruiz, who was also interested in expanding the "typical" jazz or Afro-Cuban rhythm structures.

== New York radio years ==
In 1975, while continuing to perform on congas, Dawson returned to jazz broadcasting as a jazz deejay and account executive on New York's WRVR where he hosted the highest rated New York jazz radio show on the station on Saturday (Fall '75 Arbitron New York radio ratings). Because of his knowledge of Latin music, he created Roger Dawson's Sunday Salsa Show which began on May 18, 1975 and, according to the Arbitron Radio Ratings Service, became the highest rated Sunday radio show in the New York market with over one quarter of a million listeners every Sunday from 10:00 am to 6:00 pm. The show could be heard from one end of Central Park to the other, Brooklyn's Coney Island and Prospect Park, Orchard Beach in the Bronx, the New Jersey Shore and north to Bridgeport and Stamford, Connecticut.

Due to his multiethnic audience, salsa album sales began to soar. While Roger Dawson was on WRVR the New York salsa club scene flourished with clubs located in every borough of New York, nearby New Jersey's Latin metro areas and most of these clubs often competed by featuring multiple live 11 and 12 piece name salsa bands most nights of the week. Many critics feel he was responsible for putting salsa on the map as he was the only deejay on New York commercial FM radio playing this music at that time. (John J O'Connor and Robert Palmer, N.Y. Times) In addition to playing historical cuts of vintage Cuban (Antonio Arcano, Benny Moré, Orquesta Aragón, Sonora Matancera, Cachao, Los Papines), and Puerto Rican music and Bomba and Plena rhythms (Ramito, Mon Rivera, and others) while explaining the evolution of modern salsa, he also broke the new albums of New York's emerging roster of Salsa performers.

- From the Bronx, The Palmieri brothers, Willie Colón, Spanish Harlem's Tito Puente, Ray Barretto and Joe Cuba, Brooklyn's LeBrón Brothers and New York's own Fania All-Stars, Orquesta Broadway, Tipica Novel, Tipica Ideal, Charanga America, Típica 73, Chino Rodriguez, Cuban transplants Celia Cruz, Machito, José Fajardo, Miguelito Valdes, René Touzet and Mongo Santamaría, Puerto Rican transplants Héctor Lavoe, Ismael Rivera, Ángel Canales, Adalberto Santiago, Ismael Quintana, Tito Rodríguez, Ismael Miranda, Rafael Cortijo, Kako, Tito Allen, Pete "El Conde" Rodríguez, from the Dominican Republic Johnny Pacheco and José Alberto "El Canario" and Panama transplant Rubén Blades joined by several non-Hispanic New York salsa stars Larry Harlow, Barry Rogers, Skip Farnsworth, Ronnie Cuber and Louie Kahn.
- From outside New York Puerto Rico's El Gran Combo, The Puerto Rican All Stars, Cheo Feliciano, Pellín Rodríguez, Lalo Rodríguez, Andy Montañez, Marvin Santiago, Frankie Ruiz, Willie Rosario, Bobby Valentín, Papo Lucca, Roberto Roena, Tito Rojas, Luigi Texidor, Venezuela's Oscar D'León, Columbia's Fruko y sus Tesos, Grupo Niche, and Grupo Gale.

Dawson created a blend of Latin jazz cuts by artists such as Cal Tjader, Dizzy Gillespie, Chico O’Farrill, Mongo Santamaría, Mark Weinstein (who contributed one of his originals as one of Roger's themes), Dave Valentin, Clare Fischer, Poncho Sanchez, Grover Washington and others mixed with the more "tipico" singer dominated Salsa bands. Often called "Rogelio" (Roger in Spanish), Chino y su Conjunto Melao wrote one of his theme songs: "Rogelio Tiene La Salsa" which became a salsa standard at the time. Dawson also pressured the record companies to produce quality product. For example, to save a few bucks some record companies had produced albums where the piano was out of tune which Dawson refused to give air play. He was also instrumental in exposing new and innovative salsa performers and projects such as "Grupo Folklorico Y Experimental Nuevayorquino", Manny Oquendo's Conjunto Libre, the sophisticated work of pianist arranger Jorge Millet, and the original bilingual approach of Angel Canales who could not get airplay on other commercial stations until his exposure on Roger's show broke his albums.

The readers of Latin New York Magazine, New York's monthly magazine for salsa enthusiasts, voted Roger Dawson "The best Radio Show and Deejay" for four years in a row from 1976 to 1979. (Latin New York Music Awards) He was awarded a "Citation" by Manhattan Borough President Andrew Stein for his work "in support of numerous vital community projects" such as Johnny Colon's East Harlem Music School which took Hispanic kids off the streets of Spanish Harlem and taught them how to play Salsa.

In the early sixties Symphony Sid Torin had a Latin show on late night AM radio and hosted Latin music Monday night concerts at The Village Gate. Because of his jazz background, Dawson came up with an updated concept of having a jazz soloist sit in with a salsa band and created the name "Salsa Meets Jazz". He then took this concept to the Village Gate as host for his weekly Monday night concerts in which he often participated on congas. Roger's "Salsa Meets Jazz" concert series featured such legendary jazz figures as Dexter Gordon, Sonny Stitt, Dizzy Gillespie, James Moody, Frank Wess, Pharoah Sanders, Slide Hampton, Dawson's high school pal Bobby Hutcherson and at that time, the young Wynton Marsalis. The weekly concert series at the "Gate" ran from the late seventies well into the eighties. Although originated by Roger Dawson, the name "Salsa Meets Jazz" can still be seen as promoters "borrow" his term to promote concerts or albums.

Dawson was often the host at Salsa Festivals and Fania All-Stars concerts at Madison Square Garden and in one of the concerts he was featured as a guest soloist on congas with Johnny "Dandy" Rodriguez Jr and his Típica 73 all star conga section featuring Johnny, Cachete Maldonado and Jose Grajales. He also hosted several Latin jazz concerts at the Beacon Theatre with Cal Tjader that featured Cal reunited with Willie Bobo and Mongo Santamaría.

In 1979, Dawson was aboard a private chartered jet to Havana, Cuba to participate in the historic "Havana Jam" cultural exchange concerts held at the Karl Marx Theater in Havana. He accompanied the CBS Jazz All Stars, Dexter Gordon, Stan Getz, Woody Shaw, Tony Williams, Willie Bobo, Percy Heath, Hubert Laws, Cedar Walton, Jimmy Heath, Arthur Blythe, Bobby Hutcherson, John McLaughlin, Eric Gale, Weather Report with Wayne Shorter, Joe Zawinul, Jaco Pastorius and Peter Erskine, The Fania All-Stars, with Johnny Pacheco, Héctor Lavoe, Rubén Blades, Pete "El Conde" Rodriguez, Roberto Roena and Papo Lucca, along with Billy Joel, Kris Kristofferson, Rita Coolidge and Stephen Stills.

Roger and fellow conguero Eddie Montalvo, who was with the Fania All-Stars, were invited to join in during an epic conga jam hosted by the Cuban band Irakere led by Chucho Valdés which at that time featured Paquito D'Rivera and Arturo Sandoval before they were eventually able to defect from Cuba and move to the United States. (D'Rivera in 1981 and Sandoval in 1990) Roger was also able to play with the Abreu brothers (Los Papines) during the trip.

The trip had to be arranged in secret under very tight security as the right-wing Cuban community in the U.S. had threatened those that would participate in cultural exchanges with the Castro government at that time. The U.S. State Department had also warned that those who traveled to Cuba did so at their own risk as there were no formal relations between the U.S. and Cuba. After arrival in Havana, Cuban authorities maintained tight surveillance and control of the Americans. Care had to be exercised in conversations with many Cuban musicians who confided that they wanted to defect to the U.S.

In September 1980 without any notice Viacom changed the format of WRVR from jazz to country music with the famous segue of September eighth at 10:00 am of Charlie Mingus to Waylon Jennings and that was the end of Roger Dawson's successful jazz and salsa shows on WRVR-FM which had often been sold out of 15 commercial spots per hour at the highest rates on the station. Hoping to acquire some of that revenue, Dawson was hired by all Spanish-language AM radio station WJIT as the only "bilingual" program at that station with Dawson continuing to play his salsa hits. However the low quality of AM non-stereo radio music never generated the ratings of his FM show and his show was discontinued by WJIT in 1982.

== Bandleader ==
Dawson continued to play and compose and appeared at George Wien's 1983 Kool Jazz Festival in New York with his own jazz septet, playing his compositions featuring Hilton Ruiz, piano, Claudio Roditi, brass, John Purcell, reeds, Anthony Cox, bass, John Betsch, drums, and Milton Cardona on percussion. (Reviewed by Jon Pareles, N.Y. Times, and Tony Sabournin, Latin N.Y.) This group was featured on his album Roger Dawson Septet "New York Time," recorded by Rudy Van Gelder at his Englewood, New Jersey studio.

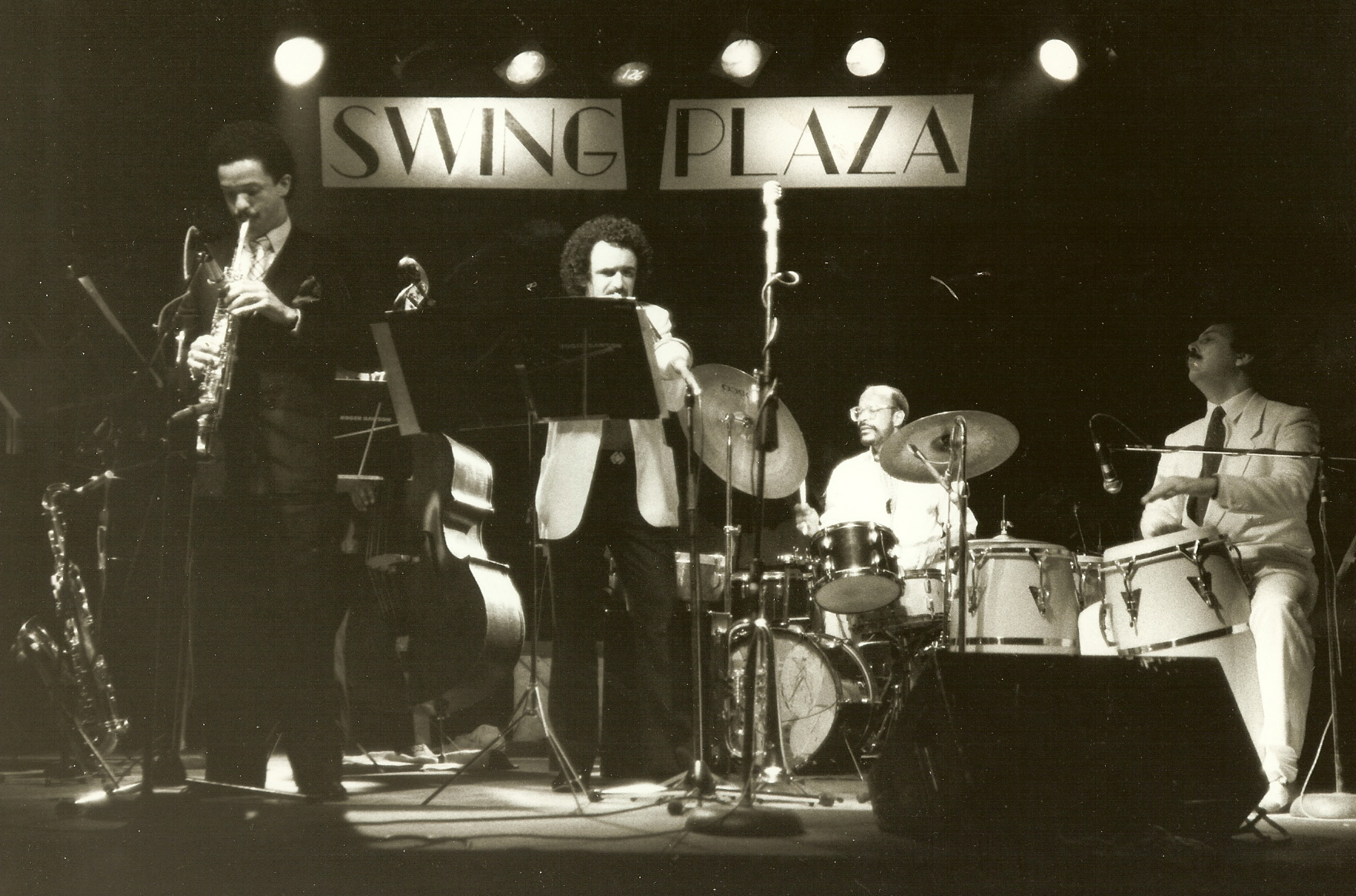
Roger Dawson Septet at Swing Plaza, New York City 1983

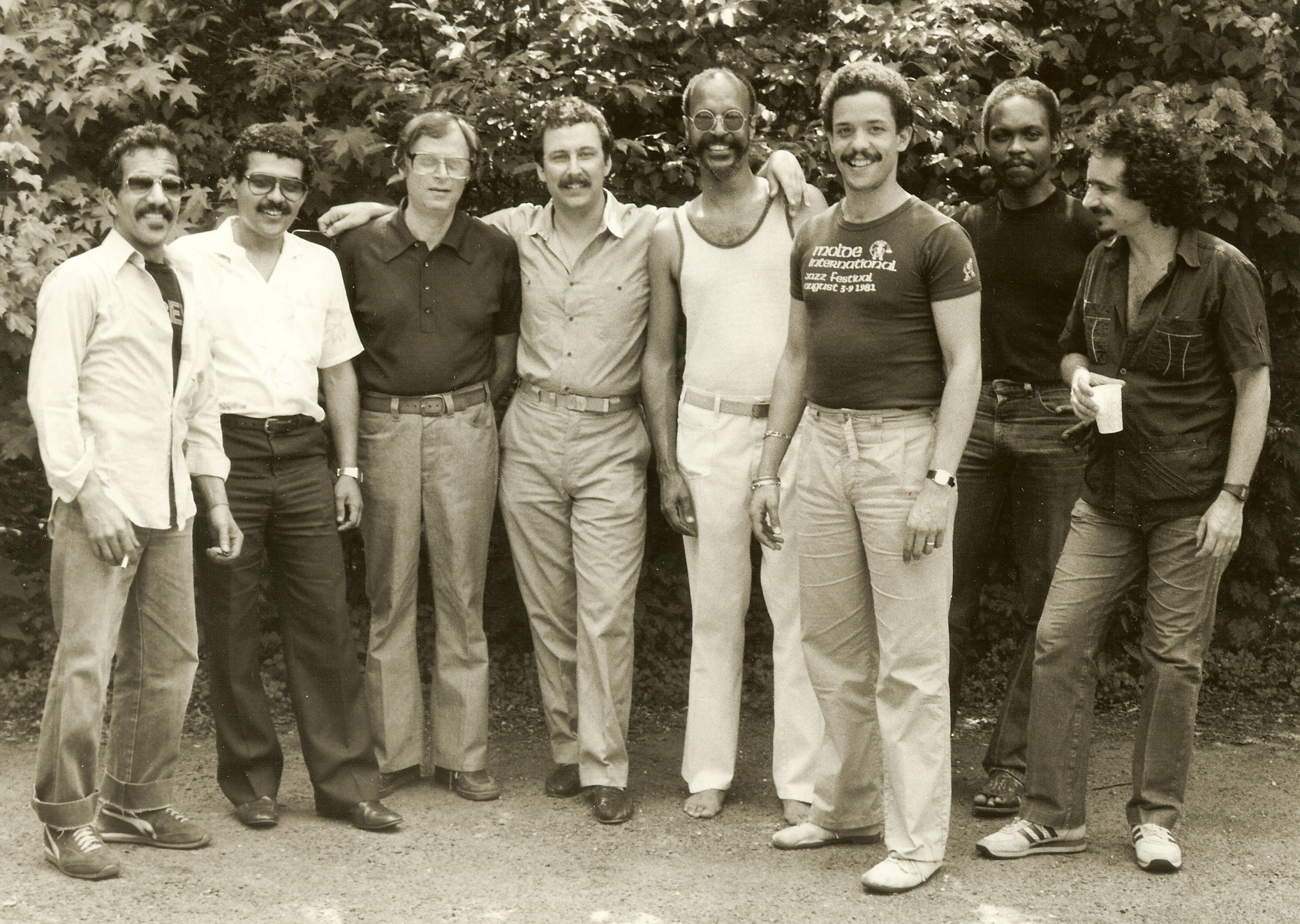
Roger Dawson Septet at Rudy Van Gelder's Englewood Cliffs studio

== Retirement ==
In the mid-eighties, Roger Dawson returned to the business side of broadcasting as an account executive in national radio sales with Katz Radio (now Katz Communications) for ten years. He then moved to CBS Radio Representatives as the New York office team manager, where he was hired away by Hispanic Broadcasting Corporation to be the director of marketing for its two New York radio properties.

Recently, Dawson moved to Metairie, Louisiana, adjacent to New Orleans. He still composes, plays the piano, and plans to become involved with jazz education and the development of jazz public broadcasting in New Orleans.
