= International Latin Music Hall of Fame =

Event honoring artists who have contributed to the Latin music genre

- Description: Honoring artists with significant contributions to Latin music
- Location: New York City, United States

The International Latin Music Hall of Fame (ILMHF) was an annual event established in 1999 and held in New York City to honor artists who have largely contributed to the Latin music genre.

In addition to the induction into the Hall of Fame, the award ceremonies include Special Recognition Awards and Beny Moré Memorial Award. The last awards were held in 2003.

== 1999 ==
The first Induction and Award ceremony was held on April 7, 1999. It honored the following inductees and recipients of the Special Recognition Awards:

=== 1999 inductees ===
Tito Puente, Celia Cruz, Eddie Palmieri, Johnny Pacheco, Joe Cuba, Israel "Cachao" López, Johnny Ventura, Orquesta Aragón, José Fajardo, Marco Antonio Muñiz, Ray Barretto, La Sonora Matancera.

=== 1999 posthumous inductees ===
Miguel Faílde, Ignacio Piñeiro, Rafael Hernández, Ernesto Lecuona, Arsenio Rodríguez, Chano Pozo, Beny Moré, Perez Prado, Mario Bauza, Machito, Tito Rodríguez, Miguelito Valdés, Enrique Jorrín, Agustín Lara.

=== 1999 Special Recognition Awards ===
- record promoter Ralph Mercado
- former Fania president Jerry Masucci
- musical director of the East Harlem School of Music Johnny Colon
- pianist-composer-conductor for the I Love Lucy show, Marco Rizo.

== 2000 ==
The second Induction and Award ceremony was held on April 5, 2000. It honored the following inductees and recipients of the Special Recognition Awards:

=== 2000 inductees ===
José Feliciano, Willie Colón, Mongo Santamaría, Ray Barretto, Cheo Feliciano, Hector Lavoe, Charlie Palmieri, Larry Harlow, La Lupe, Yomo Toro, Johnny Albino, Alfredo "Chocolate" Armenteros, Oscar D'León, Armando Manzanero, Myrta Silva, Bobby Capó, Daniel Santos, Luis Kalaff, Vicentico Valdés, Rafael Ithier and El Gran Combo de Puerto Rico, Miguel Matamoros, Rafael Cepeda, Julio Gutiérrez, Felipe Rodríguez, Rafael Cortijo, Ismael Rivera, Maria Teresa Vera, Chalía Herrera, Antonio Arcaño, Joseíto Mateo, Los Muñequitos de Matanzas, Orestes Lopez, Carlos Gardel, and Pedro Flores.

=== 2000 Special Recognition Awards ===
- Performer Harry Belafonte
- Ry Cooder
- Latin music historian Max Salazar
- TV producer Willie Sanchez
- Latin music radio host Joe Gaines
- Journalist Miguel Perez
- Artist and publisher Izzy Sanabria

=== 2000 Lifetime Achievement Award winners ===
- Israel "Cachao" Lopez
- Chico O'Farrill

== 2001 ==
The third annual ceremony and concert took place on April 4, 2001 at the Hostos Center for the Arts and Culture, Bronx, New York.

=== 2001 inductees ===
- Rubén Blades, Buena Vista Social Club, Andy Montañez, Olga Guillot, Lucho Gatica, João Gilberto, Astor Piazolla, Hector Casanova, Ruth Fernandez, Candido Camero, Patato Valdes, Wilfrido Vargas, Armando Peraza, Francisco Aguabella, Tata Guines, Tite Curet Alonso, Vitín Avilés, Ray Romero, Maso Rivera and Rafael Solano

==== 2001 posthumous inductees ====
- Antônio Carlos Jobim, Xavier Cugat, Pedro Infante, Yayo "El Indio", Libertad Lamarque, Pete "El Conde" Rodríguez, Rita Montaner, Juan Morel Campos, Julio Jaramillo, Alfredo Valdés Sr., Sylvia Rexach, Felipe Pirela, Jose Mangual Sr., Toña la Negra, Pedro Vargas, Javier Solis, Antonio Mesa, Don Azpiazu, and Luis Carlos Meyer

=== 2001 Special Recognition Awards ===
Rita Moreno, Cristóbal Díaz-Ayala, Rudy Mangual, Chata Gutiérrez, Chico Álvarez, Vicki Sola, Martin Cohen, and Ernie Ensley

=== 2001 Lifetime Achievement Award winners ===
- Johnny Albino
- Graciela

== 2002 ==
The fourth Induction and Award ceremony was held on April 10, 2002. It honored the following inductees and recipients of the Special Recognition Awards:

=== 2002 inductees ===
Julio Iglesias, Carlos Santana, Dizzy Gillespie, Paquito D'Rivera, Danny Rivera, José José, Sandro, Vicente Fernández, Astrud Gilberto, Richie Ray, Willie Rosario, Cuco Valoy, Roberto Torres, Milly Quezada, Bobby Cruz, José Curbelo, Trio Vegabajeño, Bobby Rodríguez, La Sonora Ponceña, Leo Marini, Matilde Díaz, Aldemaro Romero, Mario Clavell, Elena Burke, Carmen Miranda, Gilberto Monroig, Alberto Socarrás, Félix Chappottín, Miguelito Cuní, Noro Morales, Joe Loco, Santos Colón, Louie Ramírez, Carmen Delia Dipiní, Juan Tizol, René Hernández, and Lola Flores

=== 2002 Special Recognition Awards ===
- Miriam Colón
- Pablo Guzmán

=== 2002 Lifetime Achievement Award winners ===
- Celia Cruz
- Johnny Pacheco

== 2003 ==
The fifth Induction and Award ceremony was held on April 2, 2003. It honored the following inductees and recipients of the Special Recognition Awards:

=== 2003 inductees ===
Arturo Sandoval, Trini López, Juan Luis Guerra, Roberto Roena, Ismael Quintana, Raphael, Flaco Jimenez, Alberto Beltrán, Juan Gabriel, Nelson Ned, Ray Santos, Manny Oquendo, Justi Barretto, Pucho Brown, and Jose Luis Monero

==== 2003 posthumous induction ====
Desi Arnaz, María Grever, Consuelo Velázquez, Eliseo Grenet, Gonzalo Roig, Álvaro Dalmar, Esther Borja, and Joseíto Fernández

=== 2003 Special Recognition Awards ===
Former Palladium Dancers Cuban Pete, Augie and Margo; Millie Donay; artist Erich Padilla, and filmmaker Avenol Franco

=== 2003 Lifetime Achievement Award winners ===
- Johnny Ventura'

== Beny Moré Memorial Award ==
The Beny Moré Memorial Award was an annual award, from 1999 to 2003, presented by the International Latin Music Hall of Fame to an individual who has helped to popularize Latin music throughout the world, in honor of the late Cuban artist Benny Moré. The International Latin Music Hall of Fame struggled in relation to the more established Billboard Latin Music Hall of Fame, and ceased operation before it was time for the 2004 Beny Moré Memorial Award.

=== Award winners ===
- 1999: Emilio Estefan, Gloria Estefan
- 2000: Johnny Pacheco
- 2001: Joe Cuba
- 2002: Larry Harlow
- 2003: José Alberto "El Canario"

== See also ==
- Billboard Latin Music Hall of Fame
- Latin Grammy Hall of Fame
- Latin Songwriters Hall of Fame
- List of halls and walks of fame
