= Marvin Santiago =

Puerto Rican singer

- Born: December 26, 1947; Santurce, Puerto Rico
- Died: October 6, 2004 (aged 56) Bayamón, Puerto Rico
- Genres: Salsa and Boleros
- Occupations: Singer, composer, musician and musical arranger.

Marvin Santiago (December 26, 1947 – October 6, 2004) was a Puerto Rican salsa singer who became famous all across Latin America during the 1970s. He was also a part-time comedian on Puerto Rican television.

== Early life ==
Santiago was born in the Santurce district of San Juan, Puerto Rico. In his younger years Santiago lived between the Bolívar and Sánchez streets in the Parada 22 area of Santurce. At the age of 13, Santiago and his family moved to the Nemesio Canales public housing project where he was eventually nicknamed "El Grifo de Canales" ("The kinky-haired of Canales") by close friends and fans. Santiago was diagnosed with type 1 diabetes at a young age.

During his youth, Santiago would participate in jam sessions in his neighborhood as well as in school. His first professional job as a singer was in 1966 with Roberto Valdés group "Los Trotamundos".

== Recording career ==
=== Rafael Cortijo ===
Upon a recommendation from conga player Celso Clemente, famed Puerto Rican composer Tite Curet Alonso met Santiago and brought him to an audition for Rafael Cortijo's group. Santiago was hired to sing with Cortijo's group and in three weeks time learned the bands repertoire and started touring with them throughout Dominican Republic, New York City and Chicago. On an impulse, Santiago decided to stay in Chicago. During breaks from Cortijo's group, Santiago played with local bands "Gilberto Y Su Sexteto" & "La Sonora De Felipe Rodríguez".

Santiago's first recorded tracks appeared on Rafael Cortijo Y Su Bonche's album "Ahí Na Má! Put It There", released in 1968. Two of the tracks recorded where Santiago provided lead vocals, "Vasos En Colores" and "La Campana Del Lechón", were later recorded by Santiago as a solo artist. Santiago provided background vocals on other tracks from the album.

=== Roberto Angleró ===
In 1969 Santiago left Chicago and returned to Puerto Rico where he joined Johnny "El Bravo" López's group and toured with them briefly. On one engagement with López in Coamo, Puerto Rico, Santiago met Roberto Angleró and offered his services as a backup singer if he ever needed one. Soon after that meeting, Angleró needed a background singer and called López to see if he could lend Santiago to do some background vocals for his group and López told Angleró "you can keep him if you want to". Santiago joined Angleró's group and in 1970 recorded an album with them. The album had a minor hit with the track "Chán Con Chán". The track "Salao" from the album was later recorded as "Safa Diablo" by Bobby Valentín's group with Santiago on lead vocals. Another track from the album, "El Pantalón", was later recorded as "El Filo Del Pantalón" by Santiago as a solo artist.

=== Bobby Valentín ===
Late in 1970 Bobby Valentín, another type 1 diabetic, hired Santiago as the lead singer of his band after Frankie Hernández left his group. Valentin was one of the original members of the Fania All-Stars, an exclusive Salsa conglomerate of Fania Records musicians that showcased other performers such as Celia Cruz, Rubén Blades, Hector Lavoe, Roberto Roena and many others. Santiago would become an impromptu member of the group, and later a member in his own right.

Santiago's first recording with Valentin's group was the album "Rompecabezas", released in 1971. The songs "Amolador", "Beso Borracho", "Papel De Payaso" & "Vete Pa' llá" were big hits from that album.

Santiago's second recording with Valentin's group was the album "Soy Boricua", released in 1972. Many considered the album a classic and the title track, written by Roberto Angleró, an informal patriotic anthem for Puerto Ricans. The album's title song, and the Curet Alonso written "Pirata De La Mar", became major international hits.

Santiago was part of the band when Valentín played a concert at the Río Piedras State Penitentiary. The concert was recorded and released as two separate albums in 1975."Préstame Tu Caballo & "Dos Soneros" were the most popular tracks performed by Santiago on the recording.

On Valentín's 1976 album, "Afuera", Santiago had a few hits. Among them "Son Son Chararí" (Written by Angleró) and "El Jíbaro Y La Naturaleza". The latter a nostalgia/protest song with environmental overtones, which featured Fania All-Stars member Barry Rogers in a trombone solo. Valentín was forced to drop Santiago off his band due to Santiago's drug addiction at the time.

=== Puerto Rico All Stars ===
Late in 1976, Santiago provided background vocals and was the lead singer for the track "Los Tambores" on Puerto Rico All Stars self-titled first album. Puerto Rico All Stars featured Puerto Rican musicians exclusively and was a rival to NY based Fania All-Stars.

=== Solo Artist ===
In 1977 Santiago recorded and released his first solo album "De Los Soneros". Tito Valentín and Wito Morales produced the album. The recording had the hits "Al Revés" & "De Los Soneros".

After that album, Santiago joined Tommy Olivencia's group for about a year and recorded tracks destined to appear on Olivencia's album "Sweat Trumpet Hot "Salsa"". During the recording sessions Olivencia found out that Santiago was still under contract with his previous label and had Simón Pérez re–record Santiago's vocals. Three tracks from those sessions with Santiago's vocals, "Que Dichoso Es", "La Pela" & "Del Montón", later appeared on Santiago's compilation "15 Éxitos De Marvin Santiago" released by TH Records in 1984.

Famous arranger and producer Jorge Millet knew Santiago well and their friendship could be traced back to the late 1960s when they met while both lived in the city of Chicago. Millet was aware of Santiago's potential and as a friend wanted to lend him a helping hand by giving him the opportunity to record as a solo artist. As producer and talent scout for TH Records, Millet was able to provide the arrangements, musicians and artwork for Santiago's debut album with the label. The album, "Fuego A La Jicotea", was released in 1979. The album was very successful and considered a classic for many music fans. The album's title track, written by Cortijo, was a major hit in Puerto Rico and Venezuela. The song was a thinly veiled ode to marijuana. Santiago's remake of a song from his days in Cortijo, "Vasos En Colores", was also a major hit from the album and remained in his live repertoire throughout his career. Other hits from the album were "La Picúa", a veiled homage to the female anatomy, and "El Mangoneo" (a Mozambique very much in the style of Cortijo's "Sorongo").

Santiago's follow-up album, "Caliente Y Explosivo", released in 1980, was another success. It also had Millet as arranger, piano player and musical director. Millet also designed the cover art for this album. The album contained the hits "Al Son De La Lata Baila El Chorizo" (Originally played by Ismael Rivera when he was part of Cortijo Y Su Combo), "El Tiburón De Agua Dulce" (Written by Millet and the longest studio track Santiago ever recorded at just over seven minutes with an amazing piano solo by Millet), "La Buruquena De Doña Inés" & "Esta Noche Sale El Lobo".

Many of the songs in Santiago's solo albums were fast-paced, full of intensity and laden with humor and double entendres. Santiago was a master improviser that used "soneos" (rhyming verses common to Salsa music) with a strong sense of alliteration, consonance and rhythm that was described once by Rubén Blades this way: "(Rhythm-wise) Marvin is capable of fitting a Mack truck into a parking space where a Volkswagen Beetle won't fit." He also used strong Puerto Rican figures of speech and slang that eventually granted him the moniker of "El Sonero del Pueblo".

== Drug Arrest And Sentence ==
In 1980, at the height of his popularity, Santiago was arrested and imprisoned for cocaine possession. He served in prison a little over five out of the ten years he was sentenced due to good behavior. Ruben Blades visited Santiago while in prison something for which Santiago was eternally grateful to Blades.

Shortly after he entered prison, Santiago became a born-again Christian and stopped using drugs. As part of his rehabilitation program, Santiago became the director of a group of prisoners that dedicated their efforts towards drug prevention awareness programs (Confinados En Acción Y Prevención). Santiago went to universities and public schools to give talks about drug prevention.

In July 1981 Millet died from a massive heart attack. Santiago was allowed a prison pass to attend the funeral home where Millet's body rested and pay respects to his friend.

In late 1981, Santiago released the album "Adentro" ("Inside"). The title of the album referred to the fact that Santiago was in prison. The album was recorded live at the Bayamón regional jail and the vocals were later overdubbed in a makeshift studio at the jail. A minor hit from the album was "Auditorio Azul" (Based on the fact that prison uniforms at that facility were blue in color).

In 1982, Santiago was invited and participated on the Third Penitentiary Theater Festival held in Venezuela.

Santiago recorded three more studio albums while serving his sentence. The albums were not received as well as previous albums due to a combination of factors. Among those factors were; arrangements that were not at the same level as the ones provided by Millet produced albums, Santiago's spiritual reawakening and the considerably cleaned up lyrics on his later work, something that his hardcore fans did not approve of, and the surge of merengue groups such as the Puerto Rico-based Conjunto Quisqueya and Freddie Kenton Orchestra, as well as new local talent such as Eddie Santiago, Gilberto Santa Rosa, and Frankie Ruiz who popularized the so-called "Romantic Salsa", which eventually displaced more urban-based subject matter in Salsa songs.

== Later life ==
Santiago played several shows outside prison while he served his sentence. Santiago earned over $100,000 from those presentations. By the time he left prison, the bank account holding the earnings of his presentations while in prison had about $2,500 left. Shortly after Santiago found out, he divorced his wife.

Even though Santiago's fame waned a bit by the time he finished his prison sentence, he was able to keep a busy schedule by touring in Puerto Rico and other Latin American countries.

Santiago also appeared on Puerto Rican TV several times, often as a comedian in Luisito Vigoreaux's produced TV shows.

Santiago rejoined Valentín in 1991 to record new versions of old songs he did with Valentín for a CD commemorating Valentín's 25th anniversary in the music business. Santiago also participated on a concert celebrating Valentín's 25th anniversary, later released on DVD.

Santiago last studio album with Valentín, "Donde Lo Dejamos", was released in 1992. By this release it was noticeable that Santiago's voice was starting to fade and becoming hoarse and raspy due to poor vocal coaching.

In 1999, the House of Representatives of Puerto Rico had a tribute at the Capitol Building to honor Santiago's musical career.

In 2000, Santiago participated on the theater play "El Hospitalillo" at the Carmen Delia Dipiní Theater gathering critical acclaim.

In August 2000, Santiago participated in Tommy Olivencia's 40th anniversary celebration as a bandleader at the Tito Puente amphitheater, in San Juan, P.R. The concert was recorded and released on CD the following year.

In July 2001, a few of his musical colleagues organized a tribute concert to Santiago. The concert was held at the Tito Puente amphitheater and some of the performers sharing the stage with Santiago were Vitín Avilés, Carlos "Cano" Estremera, Meñique, Guillo Rivera & Luigi Texidor

In 2002 Santiago joined the all-star roster of singers and musicians that took part of Bobby Valentin's 35th anniversary live concert held at the Río Piedras State Penitentiary. Among the all-star lineup were Rubén Blades, Cheo Feliciano, Pedro Guzmán, Giovanni Hidalgo, Papo Lucca, Roberto Roena & Luigi Texidor. The concert was filmed and released on DVD.

For a few years until early 2003, Santiago shared a popular radio program every Saturday night with JC "El Babalao" Cordero. The program, "Salsa Gorda", featured Salsa music from the 1970s and 1980s.

In March 2004 a tribute concert was held at the Tito Puente amphitheater, in San Juan, P.R. by several musicians to celebrate Santiago's musical career. Among the performers were Luisito Carrión, Oscar D'León, Elías Lopes, Andy Montañez, Luis "Perico" Ortíz & Domingo Quiñones. The concert was filmed and released on CD and DVD.

In May 2004 Santiago was part of the singers and musical colleagues that participated on a tribute concert dedicated to the 45th anniversary of Tommy Olivencia musical career.

Santiago, who adopted Marvin Hagler's "Marvelous" nickname (both because of their common first name and the fact that, at one time, his head was shaved bald like Hagler's), had begun conversations to join a Fania All-Stars comeback as a tribute to Celia Cruz by the summer of 2004, but then, he became severely ill.

== Death ==
Santiago's diabetes started taking a toll on his health during the 1990s. In October 1996 Santiago had his right leg amputated after having three toes amputated in three separate occasions a few months earlier. He also started having problems with his sight. In November 2002 Santiago suffered two heart attacks followed by a major kidney failure in February 2003. After the kidney failure incident, Santiago had to undergo dialysis treatment. Santiago's name was placed on a waiting list for a kidney transplant but was not able to get a donor. Santiago lost vision from one eye and suffered severe kidney, heart and liver damage on the weeks prior to his death. On the afternoon of October 6, 2004 after many years of health issues, Santiago died at the age of 56 at the San Pablo Hospital in Bayamón, Puerto Rico. His funeral was well attended by the public and music friends, with his brother Billyván playing a Plena tribute to Marvin. He was buried at Lomas Verdes Cemetery in Bayamón, Puerto Rico.

== Legacy ==
In the Villa Palmeras neighborhood in Santurce, there is a square named "Plaza De Los Salseros" honoring the memory of distinguished Salsa music luminaries. In December 2009, a bust (Sculpture) of Santiago and a plaque were added to honor his music legacy. His daughter, Roseann Santiago traveled from Chicago to attend the reveal of his sculpture. Other artists honored in the square are Rafael Cortijo, Héctor Lavoe, Tommy Olivencia, Tito Puente, Ismael Rivera and Pellín Rodríguez.

Santiago left a legacy of songs still heard and popular phrases still in current use in Puerto Rico. One phrase was an affirmation: "¡O-fi-cial!". Another was a stream of references to Puerto Rican towns: "¡Baya-móntate, Barran-quítate, Vega Bájate, Ad-júntate!", roughly translated to "get on, get out of the way, get down, get together!", mentioned along the names of Bayamón, Barranquitas, Vega Baja and Adjuntas. A third one was: "¡Linda Melodía!" (Beautiful Melody!), which he uttered when a musical arrangement was particularly complex or remarkable.

He also used code phrases to refer to drugs: "¡Guayacol, con uña rallá!" was his code phrase for cocaine, and "¡Acetileno!" his reference for heroin. After his religious conversion, however, Marvin affirmed that the only substance in his life from that moment on, besides the insulin he needed daily for his diabetes, was "Cristomicina", a portmanteau of the name of Christ and erythromycin.

== Discography ==
=== Singles ===
Artist	Títle	Release Year	Record Label
Roberto Angleró Y Su Combo Candela	Rosa Blanca/Chan Con Chan	1970	GEMA 1662
Bobby Valentín	Pobre Soy/Copas De Soledad	1971	FANIA 600
Bobby Valentín	Beso Borracho/Papel De Payaso	1971	FANIA 608
Bobby Valentín	Vete Pa'lla/Besos Brujos	1971	FANIA 629
Bobby Valentín	Soy Boricua/Aquella Mujer	1972	FANIA 654
Bobby Valentín	Guaraguao/Cuando Te Vea	1974	FANIA 684
Bobby Valentín	Safa Diablo/Siempre Junto A Tí	1974	FANIA 717
Bobby Valentín	Bella Mujer/ Porque Te Fuiste	1974	FANIA 728
Marvin Santiago	Mujer De Cabaret/Caliplena	1977	Discologro 210
Marvin Santiago	De Los Soneros/Novia Mía	1977	Discologro 712
Marvin Santiago	Fuego A La Jicotea/Si Dios Me Quita La Vida	1979	THS-527
Marvin Santiago	El Mangoneo/Me Mata O Lo Mato	1979	THS-538
La Solución/Marvin Santiago	Una Canita Al Aire/Estaca De Guayacán	1981	TH-709
Marvin Santiago	Me Está Que Se Hace/Sonará Una Voz	1982	TH-799
Marvin Santiago	La Campana Del Lechón/El Aroma	1982	TH-814
Marvin Santiago	El Regreso De Mambrú/Explicame Tú	1987	TH-1246
Marvin Santiago	Cúbreme/Después	1988	TH-1350
Marvin Santiago	Corazón Desesperado/Aquella Primera Noche	1988	TH-1396
Víctor Manuelle, Miky Woodz, Marvin Santiago	Vamo’ a Ver Si el Gas Pela (feat. Miky Woodz & Marvin Santiago)	2022	Sony Music Latin

=== LP's ===
Artist	Títle	Release Year	Record Label
Rafael Cortijo y Su Bonche	Ahí Na Má! Put It There	1968	Tico Records TSLP-1183
Roberto Angleró Y Su Combo	Roberto Angleró Y Su Combo	1970	GEMA Records LPGS-3088
Bobby Valentín	Rompecabezas	1971	FANIA LP 00418
Bobby Valentín	Soy Boricua	1972	FANIA LP 00439
Bobby Valentín	Rey Del Bajo	1974	FANIA LP 00457
Bobby Valentín	In Motion	1974	FANIA LP 00469
Bobby Valentín	Va A La Cárcel Vol.1	1975	Bronco SLP 00101
Bobby Valentín	Va A La Cárcel Vol.2	1975	Bronco SLP 00102
Bobby Valentín	Afuera	1976	Bronco SLP 00104
Puerto Rico All Stars	Puerto Rico All Stars	1976	PRAS Records LP-1976
Marvin Santiago	De Los Soneros Vol. 1	1977	Discologro LP 00712
Marvin Santiago	Fuego A La Jicotea	1979	TH Records THS-2061
Marvin Santiago	Caliente Y Explosivo!	1980	TH Records THS-2089
Marvin Santiago	Adentro: En Vivo Desde La Cárcel Regional De Bayamón	1981	TH Records TH 2148
Various Artists	Primer Concierto De La Familia TH	1981	TH Records TH-AMF 2154
Marvin Santiago	El Hijo Del Pueblo	1982	TH Records TH-AMF 2210
Various Artists	Segundo Concierto De La Familia TH	1983	TH Records TH-AMF 2244
Marvin Santiago	15 Éxitos De Marvin Santiago	1984	TH Records TH-AMF 2289
Marvin Santiago	El Sonero Del Pueblo	1985	TH Records TH-AMF 2326
Marvin Santiago	Oficial! Y Ahora... Con Tremenda Pinta!	1986	TH Records TH-AMF 2433
Marvin Santiago	Bregando Con Lo Mejor	1988	TH Records TH-2539
Marvin Santiago	El Filo Del Pantalón	1990	TH Records TH-2748
Bobby Valentín	25 Aniversario Del Rey Del Bajo	1991	Bronco SO-2509
Bobby Valentín	Donde Lo Dejamos	1992	Bronco 163
Marvin Santiago	Oficial	1995	Parcha 2008
Grupo Mapeyé	Parrandas Que Llegan	1999	Max 72248
Tommy Olivencia	40 Aniversario	2001	AJ Records 1176
Bobby Valentín	35° Aniversario En Vivo - Vuelve A La Cárcel	2002	Bronco 171
Jazz Hamilton y las Estrellas del Pueblo	Las Estrellas Del Pueblo	2004	Roosevelt Records 2004
Puerto Rican Masters	Tributo Al Sonero Del Pueblo: Marvin Santiago	2005	AJ Records AJ-71440

=== Compilations ===
Artist	Títle	Release Year	Record Label
Bobby Valentín	Bobby's Best	1977	FANIA LP 00507
Various Artists	Jerry Masucci Presents Salsa Greats Vol. 2	1978	FANIA JM 524
Bobby Valentín	Marvin Santiago & Bobby Valentín	1980	FANIA JM 563
Various Artists	Jerry Masucci Presents Salsa Greats Volume III	1980	FANIA JM 571
Various Artists	Bailables Del Año Vol. 1	1982	TH Records TH-2218
Various Artists	Bailables Del Año Vol. 2	1983	TH Records TH-AMF 2266
Various Artists	Bailables Del Año Vol. 3	1984	TH Records TH-AMF 2313
Various Artists	Bailables Del Año Vol. 5	1986	TH Records TH-2437
Marvin Santiago	Éxitos Volumen 1	1986	TH CD/102
Various Artists	Bailables Del Año Vol. 6	1987	TH Records TH-2493
Various Artists	Juntos Pa' Gozá..!	1988	TH Records TH-2549
Marvin Santiago	Sonero De Verdad	1989	TH Records TH-2598
Marvin Santiago	Super Éxitos	1990	TH Records TH-1074
Various Artists	La Década De La Salsa 1980-1990 Los Diez Años Que Pusieron A Bailar Al Mundo	1990	TH Records TH-2791
Various Artists	Tesoro Romántico	1992	Musica Latina International 62
Various Artists	Los Soneros De Siempre	1994	FANIA JM 679
Various Artists	FANIA Records 1964-1994 30 Great Years Volume 1	1994	FANIA JM 702
Marvin Santiago	Oro Salsero 20 Éxitos	1994	Rodven-3128
Marvin Santiago	Platino	1994	Rodven-3169
Various Artists	Pura Salsa	1994	PSM 520557
Various Artists	Salsa Explosiva	1994	K-Tel 6105
Various Artists	Soneros Con Clave	1995	Bronco 165
Various Artists	Lo Mejor De Roven 15 Años De Éxitos	1996	TH Records TH-3255
Marvin Santiago	Fuego	1997	Rodven/Polygram 537942
Various Artists	Lo Mejor De Lo Mejor Oro Salsero	1998	T.H. Rodven 559765
Various Artists	Lo Mejor De La Música Tropical	1998	PSM 520428
Marvin Santiago	Antologia Tropical	1999	Rodven 531857
Marvin Santiago	Serie Sensacional: La Sensación De Marvin Santiago	2000	Universal Music Latino 964
Various Artists	Se Botó La Salsa Vol. 2	2000	Universal Venezuela 539601
Various Artists	Muchos Mas Recuerdos Románticos Volume 3	2000	FANIA 724
Various Artists	Salsa De Primera Clase Seis Grandes De Puerto Rico	2000	Protel 160056
Various Artists	Salsa De Primera Clase Grandes Soneros	2000	Protel 160068
Various Artists	Salsa Con To' Los Hierros	2001	Protel 160090
Bobby Valentín	Many Sides	2001	FANIA 736
Various Artists	Soneros De Acero Vol. 1	2001	Universal 013808
Marvin Santiago	Feeling's	2001	Universal 3145379422
Various Artists	Salsa! 15 Hot Salsa Dance Classics	2001	Universal 731454437028
Various Artists	Aquí Está La Salsa	2001	Platano Records 155137
Marvin Santiago	Leyendas Da La Salsa	2001	Eurotropical ET009048
Various Artists	Voces Del Milenio Salsa	2002	A.J. Records 71159
Various Artists	Old School Salsa Classics, Vol.1	2002	Universal 018295
Various Artists	Old School Salsa Classics, Vol. 2	2002	Universal 018296
Various Artists	Los Hits Gordos Del Guateque	2002	Universal D44006823928
Marvin Santiago	32 Serie	2003	Universal 980 957-8
Various Artists	Pure Salsa	2003	Platinum Disc 2818
Various Artists	Los Maestros De La Salsa Y El Son Montuno Vol 2	2003	Universal
Marvin Santiago	Aniversario	2003	Sony 8 54774 64221 4
Marvin Santiago	Éxitos Eternos	2004	Universal B0003838-02
Various Artists	Aqui Esta La Salsa	2004	Universal 2498250358
Various Artists	Old School Salsa Classics Vol. 5	2005	Universal 880183
Various Artists	Old School Original Salsa Classics Deluxe Box	2005	Universal 000584602
Various Artists	Salsahits '06	2005	J & N Records 96779
Various Artists	The Essential Guide To Salsa	2005	The Essential Guide 303
Various Artists	FANIA Soneros De Siempre	2006	Universal 653075
Various Artists	Lo Mejor De Pura Salsa	2006	Universal 653448
Various Artists	Salsa Gorda, Vol. 1	2006	Disco Hit 2154
Marvin Santiago	Pura Salsa: A Ritmo De Marvin Santiago	2006	Universal/Rodven 701519
Various Artists	The Gringo Guide To Salsa	2006	Universal 853336
Various Artists	The Greatest Salsa Ever, Vol. 1	2006	Universal 985764
Various Artists	The Greatest Salsa Ever, Vol. 2	2006	Universal 751102
Various Artists	FANIA Signature Volume I: Hot Salsa	2007	FANIA/Emusica 773 130 176 2
Various Artists	FANIA Signature Volume IV: Hard Salsa	2007	FANIA/Emusica 773 130 179 2
Bobby Valentín	La Herencia	2007	FANIA/Emusica 773 130 242 2
Various Artists	Leyendas De La FANIA, Volume 2	2007	FANIA Código 507014
Various Artists	Leyendas De La FANIA, Volume 4	2007	FANIA/Emusica 773 130 280 2
Various Artists	The Greatest Salsa Ever, Vol. 3	2007	Universal 919202
Various Artists	Sun, Sand And Salsa	2007	Universal 174155
Various Artists	Lo Mejor De Pura Salsa Vol. 2	2007	Universal 653477
Various Artists	20th Century Masters: Best Of Salsa Vol. 1 The Millennium Collection	2007	Universal 9848449
Various Artists	20th Century Masters: Best Of Salsa Vol. 2 The Millennium Collection	2007	Universal 9848450
Marvin Santiago	La Historia... Mis Éxitos	2007	Vene Music VENM 6535202
Marvin Santiago	The Greatest Salsa Ever	2008	Universal 766308
Various Artists	Concierto De Amor	2008	FANIA/Emusica 773 130 334 2
Bobby Valentín	Greatest Hits	2008	FANIA/Emusica 773 130 341 2
Various Artists	FANIA Tropical Legends	2008	FANIA/Emusica 773 130 393 2
Bobby Valentín	Historia De La Salsa	2009	FANIA/Emusica 773 130 465 2
Various Artists	Tite Curet Alonso Alma De Poeta	2009	FANIA Código 507003
Marvin Santiago	Oro Salsero 15 Éxitos	2010	Universal/Machete 751291
Puerto Rico All Stars	35th Anniversary - 15 Greatest Hits	2011	Combo 2139
Marvin Santiago	Leyendas De La Salsa		8 54774 64270 2
Pedro Conga Marvin Santiago	Super Duelo Musical Vol. 2		Salsoso CD-4194B

== Videos ==
Artist	Títle	Release Year	Label
Bobby Valentín	35° Aniversario En Vivo - Vuelve A La Cárcel	2003	Bronco 173 DVD
Bobby Valentín	En Vivo Desde Bellas Artes	2004	Bronco 174 DVD
Puerto Rican Masters	Tributo Al Sonero Del Pueblo: Marvin Santiago	2005	Universal Music Latino 371439
Marvin Santiago	El Sonero Del Pueblo Vida Y Obra	2005	Shanghai 1011 DVD

== See also ==
- List of Puerto Ricans
