= Tite Curet Alonso =

Puerto Rican composer (1926–2003)

Catalino "Tite" Curet Alonso

Background information
- Born: February 12, 1926; Guayama, Puerto Rico
- Died: August 5, 2003 (aged 77) Baltimore, Maryland, US
- Genres: Salsa
- Occupation: Composer

Catalino "Tite" Curet Alonso (February 12, 1926 – August 5, 2003) was a Puerto Rican composer of over 2,000 salsa songs.

== Early years ==
Curet Alonso (birth name: Catalino Curet Alonso) was born in Guayama, a town located in the southern region of Puerto Rico. Curet Alonso's mother was a seamstress and his father a Spanish language teacher and musician who played in the band of Simón Madera. He was two years old in 1928, when his parents divorced and together with his mother and sister moved to Barrio Obrero, located in the Santurce section of San Juan with his grandmother. His daily life experiences while living in Barrio Obrero greatly influenced his work as a composer. There he was raised by his grandmother and received his primary and secondary education. In 1941, when he was 15 years old, he wrote his first song. Among his childhood friends were Rafael Cortijo, Ismael Rivera, and Daniel Santos.

== Career as a song composer ==
After he graduated from Central High School in Santurce, he enrolled in the University of Puerto Rico where he studied journalism and sociology. He worked for the United States Postal Service, a job which he held for more than twenty years. All the while he continued to compose songs. In 1960, he moved to New York City and worked for the newspaper "Diario/La Prensa" as a sports columnist. In 1965, Curet Alonso met salsa singer Joe Quijano who recorded Alonso's Efectivamente which became a hit. Curet Alonso developed a unique style of his own which is known as "salsa with a conscience". He wrote songs about social and romantic themes which told about the situation of the poor Afro–Puerto Ricans and the hardships that they faced. He also focused many of his songs on what he called the beauty of the black Caribbeans.

Throughout his life, Curet Alonso composed over two thousand songs. Arguably, about 200 of these were hit songs, and about 50 of these were major salsa hits. Some of the people who have interpreted his songs are: Joe Quijano, Iris Chacón, Wilkins, Cheo Feliciano, Celia Cruz, La Lupe, Willie Colón, Tito Rodríguez, Olga Guillot, Mon Rivera, Héctor Lavoe, Ray Barretto, Tony Croatto, Rubén Blades, Tito Puente, Ismael Miranda, Roberto Roena, Bobby Valentín, Marvin Santiago, Willie Rosario, Menudo, Chucho Avellanet, Andy Montañez, Rafael Cortijo, Tommy Olivencia, and Frankie Ruiz. His song Las Caras Lindas (De Mi Gente Negra) (The Beautiful Faces (Of My Black People) recorded by Ismael Rivera, is considered by many in Puerto Rico as a classic. In addition to salsa, Curet Alonso also composed samba, Airto Moreira being one of the interpreters of his work in that genre. Samba de Flora, interpreted by Airto, is one of many he composed.

== Later years ==
Curet Alonso married and had a daughter and son. The marriage didn't last long and he and his wife separated. Despite the fact that the songs he wrote sold millions of records, his royalties were minimal. According to his family, Curet Alonso was tricked into signing contracts which favored the recording studios and the publishing company "ACEMLA", and not him.

In spite of their great popularity in the hearts of 'salseros' around the world his music was banned from Puerto Rican radio stations for decades by the strong-arm tactics of the music publishing company ACEMLA (Asociación de Compositores y Editores de Música Latinoamericana). ACEMLA sued every venue (radio, TV, CATV, municipalities, hotels, restaurants, etc., and even the Catholic Church) in Puerto Rico and every salsa radio station in New York City for copyright infringement of every song ever written by Curet Alonso, including songs that were already licensed by other publishing companies. In 2009, US Federal Court in San Juan released 695 songs originally licensed to Fania, but the rest of the catalog is still in ACEMLA's hands, and the legal battles continue.

== Legacy ==
External audio
- You may listen to Tite Curet Alonso's "Mi Triste Problema" on YouTube interpreted by Jose "Cheo Feliciano
- and to a piano interpretation by Luciano Quiñones of "Tiemblas" here

Tite Curet Alonso died on August 5, 2003, from a heart attack in Baltimore, Maryland. Richie Viera, a Puerto Rican and William Nazaret, a Venezuelan, both friends of Curet Alonso, made sure that his body was transferred to Puerto Rico. In Puerto Rico he was given a state funeral. First the wake was held at the Institute of Puerto Rican Culture with an honor guard, then at Puerto Rico's Capitol building in San Juan, and then at San Juan City Hall. Finally he was interred in Santa Maria Magdalena de Pazzis Cemetery in Old San Juan. Rubén Blades suspended some dates from his "farewell" tour (before becoming the Minister of Tourism for Panama) to attend Curet Alonso's funeral. Cheo Feliciano, one of his closest friends, was one of the many famous pallbearers in attendance. A posthumous collection of music composed by Tite Curet Alonso, the two-disc Alma de Poeta, was published in 2009.

A life-sized statue honoring Curet Alonso now sits at San Juan's Plaza de Armas, in Curet Alonso's favorite bench spot.

== See also ==
- List of Puerto Ricans
- List of Puerto Ricans of African descent
- French immigration to Puerto Rico
- List of Puerto Rican songwriters
- List of singer-songwriters
