= Ismael Rivera =

Puerto Rican composer and salsa singer (1931–1987)

Background information
- Also known as: Maelo; El Sonero Mayor; El brujo de Borinquén
- Born: Ismael Rivera; October 5, 1931; Santurce, Puerto Rico
- Died: May 13, 1987 (aged 55) Santurce, Puerto Rico
- Genres: Salsa, boogaloo, Puerto Rican music, bomba and plena
- Occupation: Singer-songwriter
- Instrument: Percussion
- Years active: 1948–1987
- Label: Fania
- Formerly of: Conjunto Monterrey; Orquesta Panamericana; Cortijo's Combo; Ismael Rivera and his Cachimbos

Ismael Rivera also known as "Maelo" (October 5, 1931 – May 13, 1987), was a Puerto Rican composer and salsa singer.

== Early life ==
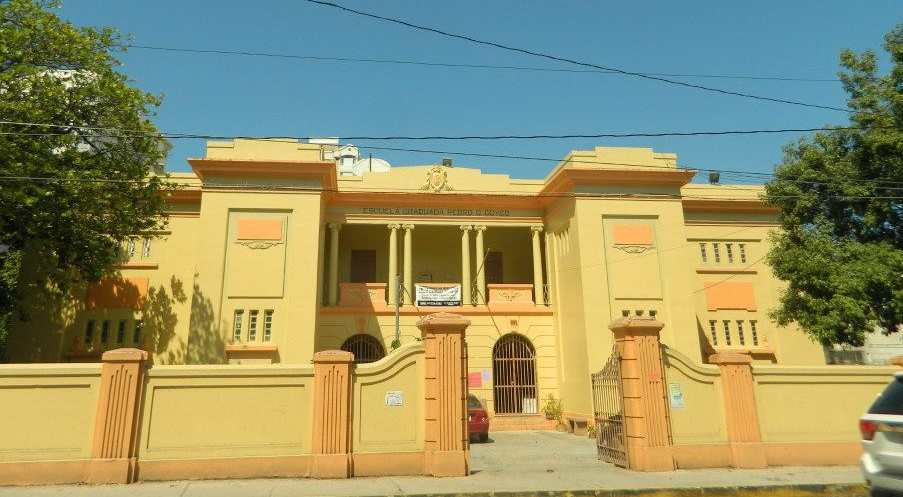
Rivera went to Pedro G. Goyco Elementary School in San Juan.

Rivera was born in Santurce, Puerto Rico, a sector of San Juan, Puerto Rico. He was the first of five children born to Luis and Margarita Rivera. His father, Luis, was a carpenter and his mother a housewife. As a child, Rivera was always singing and banging on cans with sticks. He received his primary education at the Pedro G. Goyco Elementary School and then went on to learn carpentry at a vocational school. He also shined shoes to help his family financially and, when he was 16 years old, he worked as a carpenter. During his free time he would hang around the corner with his best friend Rafael Cortijo and sing songs. In 1948, Rivera and Cortijo joined El Conjunto Monterrey, where Rivera played the conga and Cortijo the bongos. Rivera was unable to work full-time as a musician because of his work as a carpenter.

== Musical career ==
In 1952, Rivera joined the U.S. Army but was quickly discharged, because he did not speak English. When he returned to Puerto Rico, he went to work as a lead singer with Orquesta Panamericana, thanks to the recommendation of his friend Rafael Cortijo. With Orquesta Panamericana, Rivera recorded and scored his first hits with the songs "El charlatán", "Ya yo sé", "La vieja en camisa" and "La sazón de Abuela". However, an incident between Rivera and another band member, over a girl, led to his departure from the popular band. In 1954, he joined Cortijo's Combo and recorded the following songs, which soon became hits in the American Latin community:

External audio
- You may listen to Ismael Rivera's "Las Caras Linda" on YouTube.

- "El Bombón de Elena"
- "El Negro Bembón"
- "Juan José"
- "Besitos de Coco"
- "Palo Que Tú Me Das"
- "Quítate de la Vía Perico"
- "Oriza"
- "El Chivo de la Campana"
- "Maquinolandera"
- "El Yayo"
- "María Teresa"
- "Yo Soy del Campo"
- "Dejen el 67"

== El Sonero Mayor ==
Cortijo's Combo continued to gain fame and so did Rivera's reputation as a lead singer. Rivera was named sonero mayor by Cuban producer Ángel Maceda, owner of club Bronx Casino in New York; this is based in an interview done with Ismael.

The band went to New York City and played in the famed Palladium Ballroom, where the orchestras of Tito Rodríguez, Tito Puente and Charlie Palmieri also played.

Rivera married Virginia Fuente in 1951. He also had relationships with other women like Gladis Serrano, who was the wife of Daniel Santos. Rivera had five children: Ismael, Jr., Carlos, Margarita, Caridad, and Orquídea. In 1959, Rivera, together with Cortijo and his Combo, participated in the European produced movie titled Calipso, starring Harry Belafonte. He traveled with Cortijo's Combo, which also included Rafael Ithier and Roberto Roena, to Europe, Central and South America.

Rivera was arrested for drug possession after a trip to Panama with the Cortijo combo. According to later reports, various band members regularly concealed illegal drug shipments, but this time the Customs inspectors were waiting for them. Rivera took the fall, sparing other members. But this event led to the break-up of Cortijo's Combo. Shortly after, Rafael Ithier regrouped some of the former members and formed El Gran Combo de Puerto Rico.

Upon his release from jail, Rivera formed his own band called Ismael Rivera and his Cachimbos. This successful band lasted for eight years. Rivera reunited with Cortijo and recorded "Juntos otra vez". Later, Rivera went solo and did well with the recordings of "El Sonero Mayor" and "Volare". He scored his greatest hit with "Las caras lindas (de mi gente negra)" written by Tite Curet Alonso. On May 14, 1974, Rivera participated in a concert at the Carnegie Hall which was recorded live. Rivera sang a song from Bobby Capó called "Dormir contigo". One of his last public performances was in Paris, as an opener for Bob Marley in 1978.

== Later years ==
Rivera was a faithful pilgrim of the Black Christ procession in Portobelo, Panama, from 1975 to 1985, and even wrote a song about the Black Christ, known affectionately as "El Nazareno". Rivera was nicknamed "El Brujo de Borinquen" in Panama.

The death of his childhood friend, Rafael Cortijo in 1982, affected him emotionally to the point that he could not sing in the tribute to Cortijo celebrated at the Roberto Clemente Coliseum. Rivera was actively involved in the creation of a historical museum, which depicts the contributions made to the cultural life of Puerto Rico by black Puerto Ricans.

Ismael Rivera died on May 13, 1987, in the arms of his mother Margarita, from a heart attack. Rivera is buried in the San José Cemetery in Villa Palmeras in Santurce.

== Legacy ==
On October 5, 2008, Puerto Rico's governor Aníbal Acevedo Vilá signed a proclamation stating that every anniversary of Rivera's birth will be celebrated as "Día Conmemorativo del Natalicio de Ismael Rivera".

On September 27, 2001, the Puerto Rican Senate approved the law No. 134 declaring October 5 as "Ismael Rivera Day". In Villa Palmeras, Santurce, Puerto Rico, there is a plaza named "Plaza de los Salseros" which has a statue and plaque dedicated to Ismael. Celia Cruz recorded a tribute to Ismael Rivera and so did Dario y su ComboRican. Rivera was posthumously inducted into the International Latin Music Hall of Fame in 2000.

== Discography ==
=== Albums ===
- De Colores (1968)
- Controversia (1969)
- Lo Último en la Avenida (1971)
- Esto Fue lo Que Trajo el Barco (1972)
- Vengo Por la Maceta (1973)
- Traigo de Todo (1974)
- Feliz Navidad (1975)
- Soy Feliz (1975)
- De Todas Maneras Rosas (1977)
- Esto Si Es lo Mío (1978)
- El Sonero Mayor (1980)

=== Compilation albums ===
- Con Todos los Hierros (1967)
- Juntos Otra Vez (1974)
- Eclipse Total (1975)
- Llaves de la Tradición (1977)
- Oro (1979)
- El Sueño del Maestro (1980)
- Sonero No. 1 (1982)
- Maelo... El Único (1992)
- Legend (1992)
- El Sonero Mayor Vol. 1 (1992)
- El Sonero Mayor Vol. 2 (1997)
- El Sonero Mayor: Latin Roots (1999)
- Maelo: The Fania Legends of Salsa Vol. 8 (2001)
- La Época de Oro Vol. 1 (2002)
- Historia Musical de Ismael Rivera (2004)
- Salsa Legende: Best of Ismael Rivera (2004)
- La Experiencia (2004)
- Mucho Corazón (2005)
- Su Época Dorada Vol. 1 (2007)
- Su Época Dorada Vol. 2 (2007)
- Dos Grandes de Siempre: 16 Éxitos (2008)
- Grandes Éxitos Vol. 2 (2008)
- La Herencia (2008)
- Historia de la Salsa (2009)
- Greatest Hits (2009)
- La Esencia de la Fania (2009)
- A Maelo (2011)
- Selecciones Fania (2012)
- El Sonero Mayor (2012)

== See also ==
- List of Puerto Ricans
