= In Alaska: Breaking the Ice =

In Alaska: Breaking The Ice

Studio album by El Gran Combo de Puerto Rico
- Released: 1984
- Genre: Salsa

El Gran Combo de Puerto Rico chronology
La Universidad de la Salsa (1983)	In Alaska: Breaking The Ice (1984)	Innovations (1985)

Professional ratings
Review scores
Source	Rating
AllMusic	4/5 stars

In Alaska: Breaking The Ice is a 1984 album by El Gran Combo de Puerto Rico. The album was nominated for the 1985 Grammy Award for Best Tropical Latin Performance.

== Track listing ==
1. "Carbonerito" – 4:59
2. "Las Creencias" – 4:51
3. "Amigo Mío" – 4:29
4. "No Es de Pena" – 4:09
5. "Amor Brutal" – 4:46
6. "Azuquita Pa'l Café" – 4:07
7. "Imaginación" – 4:54
8. "La Mal Pensa" – 4:44

== Charts ==
Chart (1985)	Peak position
US Billboard Tropical/Salsa	14
