= Rafael Cortijo =

Puerto Rican musician and percussion instrument craftsman (1928–1982)

Rafael Antonio Cortijo Verdejo

Background information
- Born: December 11, 1928; Santurce, Puerto Rico
- Died: October 3, 1982 (aged 54) Santurce, Puerto Rico
- Genres: Salsa, Bomba, Plena
- Occupations: Musician, bandleader, composer
- Instrument: Percussion
- Years active: 1940–1982
- Labels: AF Records; Ansonia; Astro; Coco; Discomoda; Gema Records; Marvela; MVM Records; Onda Nueva; Regio; Seeco; Soul Posters; Tico; Tierrazo; Vampi Soul; Zeida

Rafael Antonio Cortijo Verdejo (December 11, 1928 – October 3, 1982) was a Puerto Rican musician, orchestra leader, composer and percussion instrument craftsman.

== Early career ==
As a child, Cortijo became interested in Caribbean music and enjoyed the works of some of the era's most successful Bomba y Plena music musicians. Throughout his life, he had a chance to meet and work with some of them, and learned how to make his own congas and panderos, the handheld drums used in bomba and plena music.

Composer and singer Ismael Rivera, known as Maelo, met Cortijo when both were youngsters, as they both grew up in the Villa Palmeras neighborhood of Santurce; they became lifelong friends. Rivera was impressed with Cortijo's conga-playing skills and was asked to join his orchestra, which played at Fiestas Patronales all over Puerto Rico.

Cortijo himself was discovered, or given his earliest encouragement by “Mr. Babalú,” the celebrated Cuban singer Miguelito Valdés. Getting his formal start in 1942 as a bongo player with Conjunto Monterey, the young Cortijo played with a range of groups in those years and made a radio appearance with the renowned Cuban group Trío Matamoros. But his breakthrough came in 1954 when he joined pianist Rafael Ithier on the Seeco label with his soulmate Ismael Rivera.

== Later career ==
By 1954, Cortijo was a member of "El Combo". His big break with the group came when El Combo's leader and pianist, Mario Román, left the band to Cortijo expecting to return to the band after a New York gig with Myrta Silva. Román never returned to the band in pursuit of other interests in New York's Latin music scene. Ismael Rivera, then the lead singer of Lito Peña's Orquesta Panamericana, joined Cortijo's orchestra known as Cortijo y su Combo in 1955. From then until 1960, his orchestra played live on Puerto Rican television shows (sometime in the 1960s, they became the house band at La Taberna India). They were the first Afroboricua (Black Puerto Rican) band to appear on Puerto Rican television.

Later on, Cortijo created another orchestra, "El Bonche" (Rafael Cortijo Y Su Bonche), where he was joined by his adopted niece, Fe Cortijo. Fe then became a well-known singer on her own. Marvin Santiago became part of Cortijo's line-up around this time. With the group, Marvin Santiago recorded "Ahí Na Má! Put It There" (1968). Santiago's first recorded tracks appeared on Rafael Cortijo Y Su Bonche's album "Ahí Na Má! Put It There", released in 1968. Two of the tracks recorded on which Santiago provided lead vocals, "Vasos en Colores" and "La Campana del Lechón", were later recorded by Santiago as a solo artist. Santiago provided background vocals on other tracks on this the album. Santiago also provided lead vocals for "Vasos En Colores" and "La Campana Del Lechón", which were later recorded by Santiago as a solo artist.

Cortijo and Rivera went on to live in New York City. Cortijo soon returned to Puerto Rico where the composer Tite Curet Alonso forged a friendship with the impoverished star and helped Cortijo produce a comeback album.

=== Cortijo y su Combo ===
In 1954, Cortijo y su Combo was composed of Rafael Ithier on piano, Cortijo on timbal, Roberto Roena on bongó, Martín Quiñones on congas, Miguel Cruz on bass, Kito Vélez and Mario Cora on trumpets, Eddie Pérez (the "female" voice of the coros, i.e., chorus) and as lead singer Ismael Rivera. The group made appearances on television shows such as La Taberna India and El show del Mediodía.

Ismael Rivera recorded the following songs with Cortijo y su Combo:

External audio
- You may listen to Ismael Rivera's "Las Caras Linda" on YouTube.

- "El Bombón de Elena"
- "El Negro Bembón"
- "Juan José"
- "Besitos de Coco"
- "Palo Que Tú Me Das"
- "Quítate de la Vía Perico"
- "Oriza"
- "El Chivo de la Campana"
- "Maquinolandera"
- "El Yayo"
- "María Teresa"
- "Yo Soy del Campo"

The orchestra virtually disbanded in 1962 when Ismael Rivera was arrested for drug possession in Panama. According to later reports, various band members concealed illegal drug shipments regularly since they were rarely intercepted at Customs; in this particular occasion an inspection was indeed made, and Rivera willingly took the bulk of the rap for the entire group (including Cortijo, who was deeply affected by Rivera's plea and regretted it through the rest of his life).Their friendship was so important to Rivera, that when Cortijo died, Rivera said he would no longer sing. Rafael Ithier and other bandmates went on to found "El Gran Combo".

In 1973, Cortijo happened to meet the pianist working at WKDM radio in New York, Pepe Castillo, who provided ideas for arrangements that Cortijo would use in his final album, His Time Machine y su Máquina del Tiempo. Coco Records reunited all the former members of "Cortijo y su Combo" orchestra for a one-time-only concert and a subsequent studio recording was issued in 1974. The sound of the album was completely unique when compared to his past works since Castillo provided a fusion of Latin folklore and jazz in his arrangements that were not popular at that time. Rafael Cortijo became well known across Latin America. He attributed his success to the sound of his percussion. According to Cortijo, Afro-Caribbean music was known worldwide. A member of the Conjunto Monterrey, based in Monterrey, Mexico, he later toured with Daniel Santos' orchestra and worked on radio.

== Death ==
Cortijo died of pancreatic cancer on October 3, 1982, at his sister Rosa Cortijo's apartment in the Luis Lloréns Torres public housing project in Santurce, Puerto Rico. He was buried at Cementerio San José in San Juan, Puerto Rico. He was posthumously inducted into the International Latin Music Hall of Fame.
