= José Curbelo =

American pianist and manager

José Curbelo (February 18, 1917, Havana - September 21, 2012, Miami) was a Cuban-born American pianist and manager. Curbelo was a key figure in Latin jazz in New York City in the 1940s and helped to popularize Mambo and the cha cha dance in the 1950s.

Both of Curbelo's parents were born in Cuba, but his father had studied classical violin in the United States before returning to play with the Havana Philharmonic Orchestra. He studied under Pedro Menendez as a child and graduated from the Molinas Conservatory at age 15.

In the 1930s he played with Cuban orchestras and formed the Orquesta Havana Riverside before moving to New York in 1939. There he played in the ensembles of Xavier Cugat, Juancito Sanabria, and José Morand early in the 1940s, and in 1942 founded his own ensemble. Among the musicians who played in Curbelo's band were Candido, Tito Puente, and Tito Rodriguez; the group split time between New York and Miami, and played in some of both cities' top nightclubs and ballrooms.

Starting in 1953, Curbelo worked with a sextet which included Al Cohn and Jack Hitchcock; this group was arranged by Cohn himself and Puente as well as Rene Hernandez and Chico O'Farrill. Curbelo's band recorded several albums in the cha-cha style for Morand's Fiesta Records in the 1950s. Curbelo wrote unforgettable songs in this period ("La La la", "La familia", "La Runidera" (1946), "Sun Sun babae" (1952), "Mambo y cha cha cha"); these songs have since been sung by Ray Barreto and Oscar de Leon. Curbelo disbanded the group in 1959 and took up managing, founding an agency for Latin musicians called Alpha Artists.

Throughout the 1960s, Curbelo managed most of the major Latin bands in New York and was successful in negotiating favorably with promoters on behalf of his artists.

Curbelo invested in real estate later in life and moved to Miami in the 1980s, where he continued booking artists for festivals. He died in 2012 after spending the last few months of his life at a hospice in Aventura, Florida.

== Discography ==
He made recordings in the 1950s and the early 1960s on Fiesta.
