= Vitín Avilés =

Puerto Rican singer

Vitín Avilés (Mayagüez, Puerto Rico September 30, 1930 – Manhattan, New York, January 1, 2004) was a Puerto Rican singer, Born in the Barrio San Silvestre of Mayagüez. He learned from his father the Barber job, while he was singing his first gigs in amateur radio shows. In 1943 started as a lead singer on the Orquesta Hatuey of William Manzano and with the Orquesta Anacaona. In 1944 he went to San Juan, Puerto Rico, to sing with the Orquesta of Miguelito Miranda on where he recorded his first album. who in the 1940s and 1950s often went unnoticed, even though he was among Latin music's five most popular band singers during the period. He sang in Tito Puente's orchestra and was lead vocals on the hit single Ran Kan Kan. He also sang with Tito Rodríguez, Carlos Varela (bandleader), with his own orchestra, and for Charlie Palmieri. He died January 1, 2004, at St. Vincent's Hospital, in Manhattan, New York.
