= Carlos Varela (bandleader) =

Cuban musician

Carlos Varela was a Cuban musician. He was leader of the "Havana Madrid Orchestra" during the 1930s–1950s at New York's Havana-Madrid club on Broadway. He was one of the founding members of the Latin-American Music Society, an artists' rights and trade group, founded by musicians Noro Morales, Machito, Bartolo Hernández, Jose Curbello and Varela, with Morales' manager, lawyer Bernie Ackerman in New York in 1947.

In the 1980s, Varela offered private piano lessons to young students from his small Miami apartment.
