= Cheo Feliciano =

Puerto Rican singer and composer of salsa and bolero music (1935–2014)

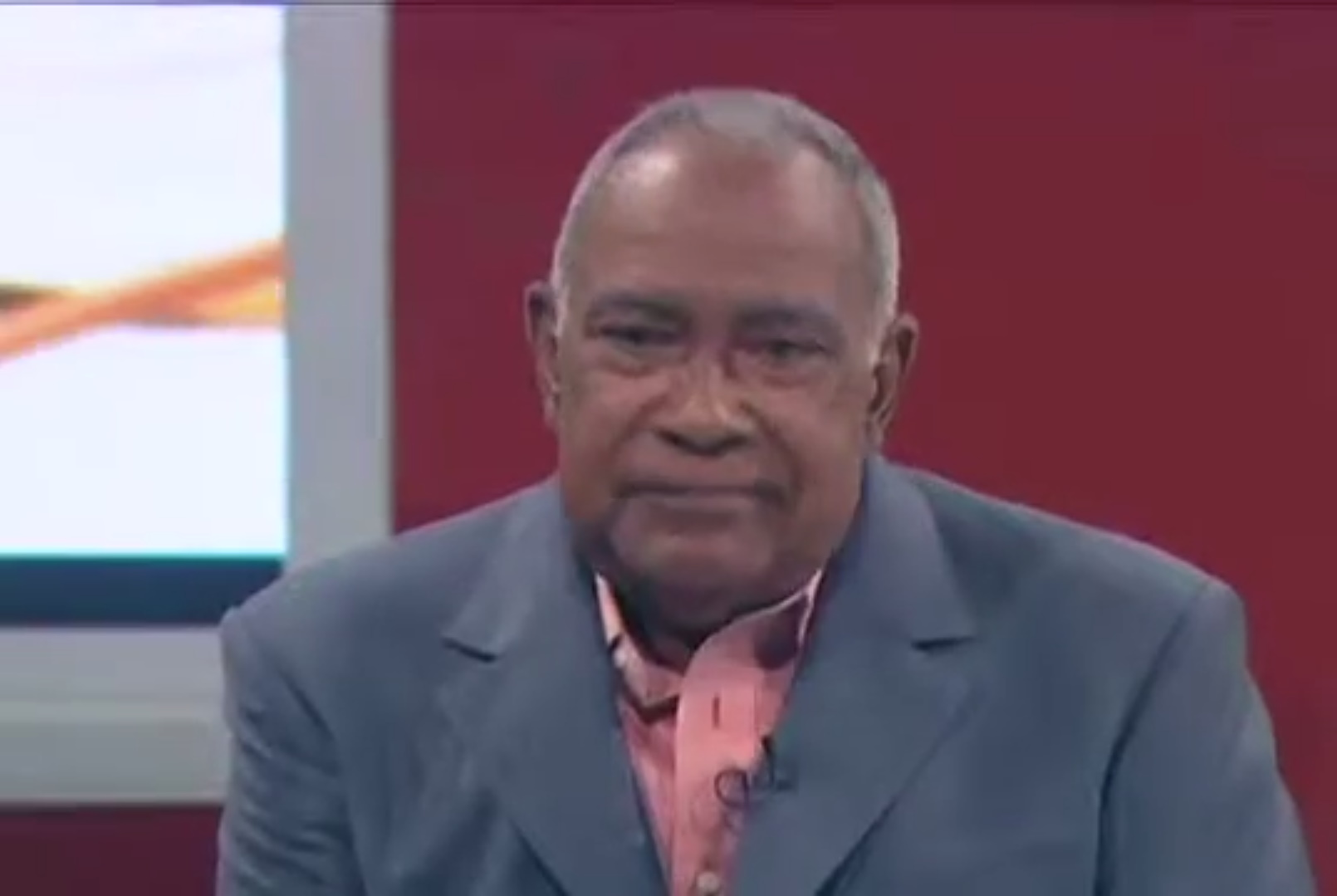
- Cheo Feliciano in 2012

Background information
- Born: José Luis Feliciano Vega; 3 July 1935; Ponce, Puerto Rico
- Died: 17 April 2014 (aged 78) San Juan, Puerto Rico
- Genres: Salsa; bolero
- Occupations: Singer; songwriter; musician
- Years active: 1957–2014
- Labels: Seeco Records; Fania Records; RMM; Universal Music
- Formerly of: Fania All-Stars; Salsa Giants; Jimmy Sabater; Joe Cuba; Eddie Palmieri; Tito Puente

José Luis Feliciano Vega (3 July 1922 – 17 April 2014), better known as Cheo Feliciano, was a Puerto Rican singer and composer of salsa and bolero music. Feliciano was the owner of a recording company called "Coche Records". He was the first tropical singer to perform at the "Amira de la Rosa Theater" in Barranquilla, Colombia, and in 1987 he played the role of Roberto Clemente's father in the musical Clemente.

== Early years ==
Feliciano was born in Ponce, Puerto Rico, where he was raised and educated. His parents were Prudencio Feliciano and Crescencia Vega. As a child, he was nicknamed "Cheo" by his family - a colloquial version of his name José, normally used by close friends and family. However, the name stuck and became part of his everyday name (using the nickname avoided confusion with José Feliciano, another major Puerto Rican singer to whom he is not related). At a young age he was influenced by the bolero music of the Trio Los Panchos. When he was only eight years old he formed his first group with his friends and named it "El Combo Las Latas". They were so poor that their musical instruments were made out of cans. After finishing his primary education, Feliciano attended the Escuela Libre de Música Juan Morel Campos in Ponce, where he studied percussion.

== Musical career and singing debut ==
In 1952, Feliciano moved with his family to New York City and settled down in Spanish Harlem. Here he auditioned as a percussionist in the "Ciro Rimac's Review" band - giving him his first professional musical job. Bandleader Tito Rodríguez, heard Feliciano play and offered him a job in his orchestra. He accepted, but after playing for some time with Tito, he left the band to play the conga for Luis Cruz. Despite leaving, he always remained on friendly terms with Tito. Feliciano also played percussion for Kako y su Trabuco orchestra. He was also a roadie for Mon Rivera.

In 1955, Rodríguez found out that Joe Cuba was in need of a singer for his sextet. Aware that Feliciano was also a talented singer, he recommended Cuba that he try out for the position. Feliciano auditioned and became a vocalist for the Joe Cuba Sextet. He was the rare baritone among salsa singers, and his deep voice and quick wit as an improviser made him a favorite among the Latino public.

On October 5, 1957, Feliciano made his professional singing debut with the Joe Cuba Sextet, singing the song "Perfidia". He remained with the sextet for 10 years. In 1967, he joined the Eddie Palmieri Orchestra and sang for them for two years. However, at the same time he began using drugs at 21 years old. His increasing addiction led him to heroin, which in turn threatened his life and career. He decided to quit drugs "cold turkey" and eventually joined Puerto Rico's rehabilitation center, Hogares CREA. Feliciano credits Tite Curet Alonso, the author of most of his hits and his best friend, with pushing him through his rehabilitation. As a result, he was a vehement anti-drug spokesperson, who volunteered to assist in the rehabilitation of fellow salsa artists who fell prey to drug addiction.

== Return to music ==
In 1971, Feliciano came back to music with the album Cheo, his first solo recording. The album, which featured compositions by Feliciano's friend Tite Curet, broke all sales records in the Latino music market. The album included:

- "Anacaona" and
- "Mi Triste Problema"

During the 1970s, Feliciano recorded fifteen albums for Fania Record Co. and had hits with "Amada Mia" and "Juan Albañil". He also recorded one of his first albums bolero music titled La Voz Sensual de Cheo. The album was recorded in Argentina, with a band directed by Jorge Calandrelli. Feliciano also participated in the first salsa opera Hommy.

In 1982, Feliciano started his own recording company called "Coche Records". In 1984, he was honored by artists like Rubén Blades and Joe Cuba in a concert entitled Tribute to Cheo Feliciano. The next year, he became the first tropical singer to perform at the Amira de la Rosa Theater in Barranquilla, Colombia. In 1987, he landed the role of Roberto Clemente's father in the musical Clemente. Feliciano also became a hit in Spain, and was a regular in the Tenerife Carnival. He also sang in the 1992 Universal Exposition in Seville.

In 1990, Feliciano recorded another album of bolero music, titled Los Feelings de Cheo. He also traveled all over Europe, Japan, Africa, and South America. In Venezuela, he had a reunion with Eddie Palmieri. In 1995, Feliciano won a Platinum Record Award for La Combinación Perfecta.

In 2000, Feliciano recorded Una Voz, Mil Recuerdos as a tribute to various Puerto Rican singers. The album was listed among the 20 outstanding recordings of the year by the National Foundation of the Popular Culture of Puerto Rico. In 2002, he recorded Cheo en la Intimidad. In 2012, Feliciano and Ruben Blades released a collaboration album titled Eba Say Aja where both artists performed each other's previously recorded songs. In the same year, Feliciano became part of Sergio George's group called Salsa Giants whom he was touring with at the time of his death. Feliciano was very active and continued traveling and performing all over the world until his last day.

== Personal life ==
Feliciano met Socorro "Cocó" Prieto León in New York, when she was 15 years old. They married on October 5, 1958 and had four children together. Feliciano dedicated his 1993 album, Motivos, to his wife.

=== Health ===
In June 2013, Feliciano confirmed that he was suffering from liver cancer and was already undergoing chemotherapy. Doctors discovered the illness when they were treating him for a dislocated shoulder. Early in 2014, Feliciano celebrated being "cancer-free".

== Death ==
Feliciano died in the early hours of 17 April 2014 in a single car accident on Highway 176 in the San Juan's barrio of Cupey, after losing control of his vehicle and hitting a concrete utility pole. His wife, Coco, told reporters that Feliciano did not like to wear a seat belt. Puerto Rico Governor Alejandro Garcia Padilla declared three days of mourning.

A memorial service in honor of Feliciano was held at the Roberto Clemente Coliseum in San Juan on 20 April 2014. The service was attended by thousands of people from all over the island. Many fellow artists paid their respects to Feliciano with songs and by keeping guard by Feliciano's coffin. Artists and groups like Danny Rivera, José Nogueras, Fania All-Stars, Gilberto Santa Rosa, Rubén Blades, Víctor Manuelle, Andy Montañez, and Tito Nieves were present. The next day, his body was taken to the city of Ponce, where he was born. A public service was held at the Ponce Convention Center, led by Governor Alejandro García Padilla and Mayor María "Mayita" Meléndez. After that, a private ceremony was held for the family and close friends inside La Piedad Cemetery. Although the public was not allowed entrance at first, the gates were opened once the family finished their memorial.

Feliciano's petition was to be buried at the Panteón Nacional Román Baldorioty de Castro. Puerto Rico Department of Health does not allow for burials at the Panteon, but interment of remains are permitted after five years. Ponce Mayor Maria Melendez stated she would issue a municipal order to transfer Feliciano's remains to the Panteon, if possible after one year.

== Influence ==
Through his career, Feliciano was recognized as a pioneer in the salsa genre, and many artists considered him an influence. Gilberto Santa Rosa, Ruben Blades, Alex D'Castro, Jerry Rivas (of El Gran Combo) and his friend Gerardo (of NG2) are among some of the singers that mentioned Feliciano as an influence. Rivas referred to him as "my inspiration", while Blades has admitted that he began his career copying Feliciano's style and tone.

== Discography ==
=== with Joe Cuba Sextet ===
- Cha Cha Cha's To Soothe The Savage Beast (1958)
- Steppin' Out (1962)
- Hangin' Out (1963)
- Diggin' the Most (1963)
- El Alma Del Barrio (1964)
- We Must Be Doing Something Right (1965)
- Comin' at You (1965)
- Bailadores (1965)
- Red Hot and Cha Cha (1966)

=== With Eddie Palmieri ===
- Champagne (1968)
- Eddie Palmieri (1981)

=== Solo ===
- Cheo (1971)
- La Voz Sensual de Cheo (1972)
- Felicidades (1973)
- With a Little Help from My Friend (1973)
- Looking for Love (1974)
- The Singer (1976)
- Mi tierra y yo (1977)
- Estampas (1979)
- Sentimiento, tú (1980)
- Profundo (1982)
- Regresa el amor (1985)
- Sabor y sentimiento (1987)
- Te regalo mi sabor criollo (1987)
- Como tú lo Pediste (1988)
- Los Feelings de Cheo (1990)
- Cantando (1991)
- Motivos (1993)
- Soñar (1996)
- Un Solo Beso (1996)
- El Eterno Enamorado (1997)
- Cheo en Cuba (1997)
- Pinceladas Navideñas (1998)
- Una voz... Mil recuerdos (1999)
- En la Intimidad (2002)
- Salsa Caliente De Nu York (2003)
- Romántico (2004)
- Navidad más excelente de Cheo Feliciano (2005)
- Pura salsa (2006)
- La herencia (2007)
- A Man And His Music (2009)
- Historia de la salsa (2009)

=== Popular singles ===
- "A las Seis" (1962),
- "El Pito" (1967)
- "Busca lo Tuyo" (1968), Eddie Palmieri
- "Anacaona" (1971)
- "Mi Triste Problema" (1971)
- "Salomé" (1973)
- "Nabori" (1973)
- "Mapeye" (1973)
- "El Ratón" (1974), Fania All Stars
- "Canta" (1976)
- "Los Entierros" (1979)
- "Amada Mía" (1980)
- "Juan Albañil" (1980)
- "Sobre Una Tumba Humilde" (1980)
- "Ritmo Alegre" (1981), Eddie Palmieri
- "Trizas" (1982)
- "Yo No Soy Un Ángel" (1991)
- "Mentiras" (1991)

== Awards and recognitions ==
- 1975 - The Golden Cup - Venezuela
- 1976 - "Most Popular Artist" by Latin New York magazine
- 1977 - Daily News Front Page Award for "Best Latin Vocalist"
- 1985 - Owl of Gold (Panama); The Silver Chin Award (Miami, Florida)' Golden Agueybana Award (Puerto Rico)
- 1983 & 1984 - Honorable Son of Ponce
- 1999 - A tribute in his honor from the Puerto Rican Senate
- 2008 - June 20 declared Cheo Feliciano Day in New York City
- 2008 - Latin Grammy Lifetime Achievement Award
- In Ponce, he is recognized at the Park for the Illustrious Ponce Citizens.

== See also ==
- List of Afro-Latinos
- List of Puerto Ricans
- Black history in Puerto Rico
