= El Gran Combo de Puerto Rico =

Puerto Rican salsa orchestra band

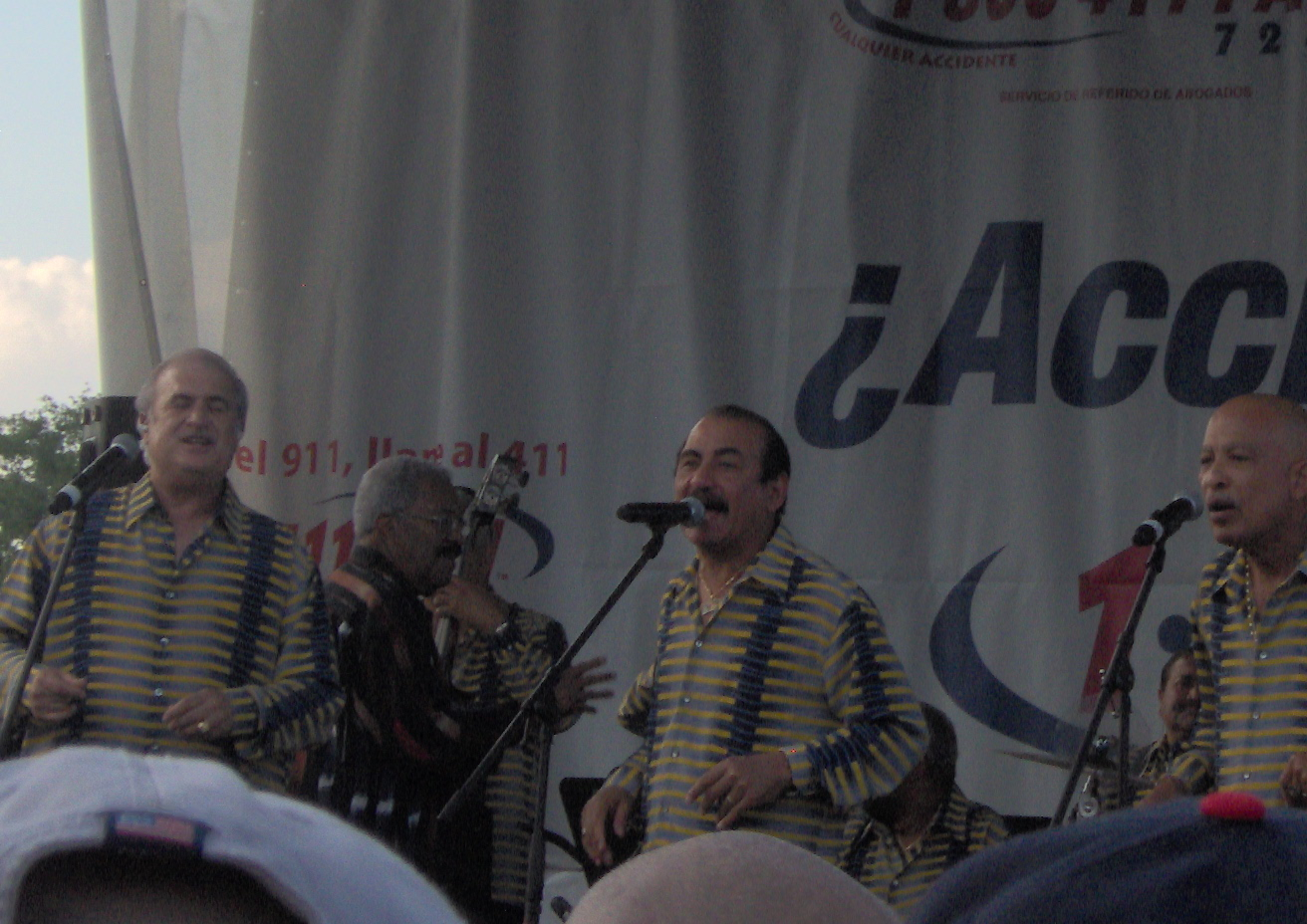
- From left to right: singer Jerry Rivas, musical director Rafael Ithier and singers Charlie Aponte and Luis "Papo" Rosario. The first song of El Gran Combo was Tingoli

Background information
- Also known as: The University of Salsa; Los Mulatos del Sabor; El Combo; El Gran Combo
- Origin: Puerto Rico
- Genre: Salsa
- Years active: 1962–present
- Members: Jerry Rivas; Joselito Hernández; Anthony Garcia; Freddie Miranda; Moisés Nogueras; Freddy Rivera; Domingo "Cuqui" Santos; Miguel "Pollo" Torres; Richie Bastar; Josué Urbina; José "Lenny" Prieto; Julio "Julito" Alvarado; Carlos Vargas
- Past members: See below

El Gran Combo de Puerto Rico, commonly known as El Gran Combo, is a Puerto Rican salsa orchestra based in San Juan, Puerto Rico. Celebrating its 50th anniversary in 2012, it has often been considered to be Puerto Rico's most successful musical group. The group received the moniker La Universidad de la Salsa (The University of Salsa) in Colombia, due to the sheer number of famous salsa musicians and singers who developed their careers with it, who started with the group (particularly Andy Montañez), or who were occasionally backed up by the band and La India.

The salsa orchestra was founded in May 1962, by Rafael Ithier. Ithier was still nominally its musical director, and was the only remaining member from the band's original lineup until his death in 2025. From 2010 until his death in 2022, Willie Sotelo, who joined the group in 2006 as pianist, had become the band's de facto musical director on tours, with Ithier conducting the group and playing occasionally in select live performances. El Gran Combo still performs after more than 60 years together. The group was scheduled to celebrate its 50th anniversary on 11 November 2012 at the Coliseo de Puerto Rico. The group started its celebration with a grand world tour that took them to five continents.

On November 24, 2022, El Gran Combo de Puerto Rico, on its 60th anniversary, was featured on Norberto Vélez's YouTube channel titled "Sesiones Desde La Loma Ep. 32". El Gran Combo de Puerto Rico is the first Orchestra featured at the hill.

== History ==
=== Inception ===
Rafael Ithier had been a member of Rafael Cortijo's "Cortijo y su Combo" orchestra. After singer Ismael Rivera faced legal drug possession problems when arriving from Panama, some of the group's musicians departed, with Ithier relocating temporarily to the eastern United States. Rafael Álvarez Guedes, the Cuban-born owner of the Gema recording label (and brother of comedic actor Guillermo) needed a backing band to record an album for legendary Dominican merengue singer Joseíto Mateo. He asked Ithier for assistance, and Ithier responded by bringing in many of his former colleagues return to the studio. For their first recording sessions, the orchestra included some musicians from Cortijo's original lineup, including saxophonist Hector Santos, trumpet player Rogelio "Kito" Velez, and percussionists Martín Quiñones, Miguel Cruz and Roberto Roena. Alvarez-Guedes proposed to call it Rafael Ithier y su Combo. This was in obvious similarity to Rafael Cortijo y su Combo. Ithier opposed the idea mainly because he was so frustrated with the situation that happened with Cortijo, that he wasn’t thinking of staying around much longer than a few months. Since the word “combo” was in vogue those days for mid-size bands, the group landed with a name that would reflect a “new and improved” combo, a great combo; El Gran Combo. The album they recorded was titled Menéame Los Mangos, El Gran Combo con Joseito Mateo (the phrase translates as Shake Your Mangoes for Me, a double entendre).

The group met again to define the foundations of a proper orchestra and chose singers Daniel Vázquez, Pellín Rodríguez and Chiquitín García (who later composed among other major EGC hits, "No Hago Más Ná", and many of Gran Combo's hits). On May 21, 1962, El Gran Combo was heard for the first time on Puerto Rican radio. Later on, they became the in-studio musicians of the live television show, "La Taberna India", sponsored by India Beer.

After their live debut at Hotel La Concha in San Juan, Puerto Rico, Chiquitín García left the orchestra. Vocalist Sammy Ayala, who had also played with Ithier in the Cortijo orchestra, recommended the hiring of Andy Montañez. Andy Montañez was singer for a trio in Puerto Rico and had never sung salsa.

=== First albums ===
On November 20, 1963, El Gran Combo released their first group album, Menéame los mangos, with Joseito Mateo as lead singer. Later came Acángana. This album became a number-one hit in New York City, Panama and Puerto Rico. Their success opened doors for them in many Latin American markets and they gained an exclusivity spot on the Puerto Rican television show El Show de las 12. The album also reached gold status.

In 1964, trumpet player and arranger Elías Lopes joined the orchestra, coinciding with the group's first popularity wave. With their daily TV appearances and extensive touring, however, demand for the group declined due to overexposure. Still, in 1967, their album Boogaloo con el Gran Combo also reached gold status. In 1969, Roena and Lopes left the orchestra to form the Apollo Sound together. Despite all this, that same year the group was awarded an Agüeybana de Oro in Puerto Rico. Also, in 1969, Rafael Ithier hired dancer/choreographer Mike Ramos to implement dance routines, which became a signature of El Gran Combo's live performances. Mike came from the world-famous New York City Palladium Ballroom scene. Prior to joining El Gran Combo, Mike danced with the Tito Puente Orchestra and Perez Prado Band among others.

=== The 1970s ===
In 1970, El Gran Combo's contract with Gema Records was not renewed. Despite offers from other record companies including the Motown label, the group decided to self-release recordings under their own newly created independent label, Combo Records (alternatively known as EGC Records). The first album released on the label was the 1970 album entitled Estamos Primeros. On February 15, 1970, the members of El Gran Combo shared a near death experience. They were in Venezuela, and scheduled to fly the following day to Las Américas International Airport in Santo Domingo, Dominican Republic. After landing they were told about the Dominicana Airlines DC-9 that crashed off the Caribbean coast which occurred the night before. Therefore, the tale about a group member having a bad feeling regarding that flight while stranded at the Santo Domingo airport is not entirely true, since they did not arrive there until the day after the crash.

In 1971, El Gran Combo introduced the trombone to their instrument mix. The trombone was played by Fanny Ceballos. Soon after, their production named De Punta a Punta was released. In 1972, they released the album "Por el Libro", which marks the 10th anniversary of the orchestra. Pellín Rodriguez left the group to embark on a solo career. Rodríguez was replaced by Charlie Aponte at the recommendation of Jerry Concepción and the well known sportscaster Rafael Bracero, both friends of Ithier.

In 1973, El Gran Combo sang in front of 50,000 fans at the famous Yankee Stadium in New York City as the opening act for the Fania All-Stars' sold-out concert.

Montañez left the band in early 1977 and went to live in Venezuela where he replaced Oscar D'León in another orchestra, Dimension Latina. Jerry Rivas was then chosen to join the orchestra. The success of this new duo was proved with their 1977 album International and 1978's En Las Vegas which reached gold record status.

In 1966, En Navidad, a Christmas album, was released, with Martín Quiñones appearing as Santa Claus in the album's cover. After an automobile accident in early 1977, Quiñones was replaced in the band by his son, Martín Quiñones Jr. He stayed until 1979, being replaced by Miguel “El Pollo” Torres.

=== Recent years ===
The band continues to receive numerous awards throughout Latin America. In 1984, they traveled to Alaska where they received a great welcome. Soon after Combo Records released their album titled In Alaska: Breaking the Ice. Produced by Ralph Cartagena, the album garnered them their first Grammy nomination.

In 1982 they celebrated their 20th anniversary playing at Madison Square Garden. They also reached Europe that year playing in Paris, France.

In the early 1990s, they were honored in the city of Madrid, Spain to open the decade on the right track. On March 29, 1992, they celebrated a huge concert in the Hiram Bithorn Stadium in front of 30,000 people.

=== The new millennium ===
In 2000, El Gran Combo was inducted into the International Latin Music Hall of Fame. In 2002, the group celebrated their 40th anniversary with two sold-out concerts at the Ruben Rodríguez Coliseum in Bayamón, Puerto Rico. This celebration spawned an album. In the same year, they were awarded the Billboard Latin Music Lifetime Achievement Award. Among other musicians, they are one of the "enduring superstars of the island."

As of 2006, the orchestra has released over 40 albums or CD's, and it has received many awards, including golden albums, a "Calendario de Plata" in Mexico, a "Golden Congo" in Colombia, a Paoli Award in their native Puerto Rico, an honorable distinction in Spain and countless others.

In 2006, they released their album titled Arroz con Habichuela ("Rice and Beans"). It has already spawned three hit singles. The first one titled "No Hay Manera" ("There's No Way"), the title song, and "Si la ves por ahí".

Around 2006, Rafael Ithier became ill and decided to take a back seat for live performances and although he mostly still tours with the band, Ithier is just conducting the combo rather than playing the piano, however he is still very much the bandleader of the group. Willie Sotelo took the place of Ithier on the piano and also took over some of the travel management duties.

In 2007, El Gran Combo performed two massive concerts at the José Miguel Agrelot Coliseum to celebrate their 45th anniversary.

In 2010, two tribute albums were released, one by former member Andy Montañez and another by the bank Banco Popular, as part of their annual music series.

In August 2011, El Gran Combo rewrote the lyrics to their own hit "No Hago Más Ná", or "I Don't Do Anything Else" that sang in satire about the day of a lazy person to a more positive "Echar Pa'lante" or "Moving Forward" which sang about the virtues of going to work. They also released a video with a positive introductory message which showed clips of working people in similarities with them playing instruments.

The group is still going strong and working continuously. Some music historians have dubbed them La Universidad de la Salsa (The University of Salsa), which is also the title of their hit 1983 album.

Recent changes have occurred within the last several years. On August 9, 2013, Founder musician Eddie "La Bala" Perez died due to health complications. On December 12, 2014, Charlie Aponte, one of the vocalists of El Gran Combo for 41 years, retired for personal reasons and launched his own orchestra. His last performance was in Cali, Colombia on December 30, 2014. On January 24, 2015 Anthony Garcia became the new vocalist, as Aponte's replacement. Later in the year, El Gran Combo received the Latin Grammy Lifetime Achievement Award. Two years later, they were presented with the ASCAP Latin Heritage Award. In early 2019, Luis "Papo" Rosario, the main choreographer and third vocalist since 1980, retired. Joselito Hernández was added as Rosario's replacement.

The band's song Un verano en Nueva York was sampled in NUEVAYoL, the opening song of Bad Bunny's 2025 album Debí TiRAR MáS FOToS.

== Discography ==
Album	Year	Label
Menéame los Mangos, el Gran Combo con Joseito Mateo	1962	Gema Records/ Viva Combo Music
El Gran Combo... de Siempre	1963	Gema Records/ Viva Combo Music
Acángana	1963	Gema Records/ Viva Combo Music
Ojos Chinos, Jala Jala	1964	Gema Records/ Viva Combo Music
El Caballo Pelotero	1965	Gema Records/ Viva Combo Music
Traigo un Tumba'o, Meneíto Me	1965	Gema Records/ Viva Combo Music
El Swing del Gran Combo con Pellín y Andy	1966	Gema Records/ Viva Combo Music
En Navidad	1966	Gema Records/ Viva Combo Music
Maldito Callo	1967	Gema Records/ Viva Combo Music
Esos Ojitos Negros	1967	Gema Records/ Viva Combo Music
Fiesta Con El Gran Combo	1967	Gema Records/ Viva Combo Music
Boleros Románticos	1967	Gema Records/ Viva Combo Music
Tú Querías Boogaloo, Toma Boogaloo	1967	Gema Records/ Viva Combo Music
Pata Pata, Jala Jala Y Boogaloo	1967	Gema Records/ Viva Combo Music
Boogaloos Con El Gran Combo	1967	Gema Records/ Viva Combo Music
Tangos	1967	Gema Records/ Viva Combo Music
Merengues	1968	Gema Records/ Viva Combo Music
Guarachas	1968	Gema Records/ Viva Combo Music
Bombas, Bombas, Bombas	1968	Gema Records/ Viva Combo Music
Los Nenes Sicodélicos	1968	Gema Records/ Viva Combo Music
Latin Power	1968	Gema Records/ Viva Combo Music
15 Grandes Exitos Vol. 1	1967	Gema Records/ Viva Combo Music
15 Grandes Exitos Vol. 2	1967	Gema Records/ Viva Combo Music
15 Grandes Exitos Vol. 3	1967	Gema Records/ Viva Combo Music
Smile, It's El Gran Combo	1968	Gema Records/ Viva Combo Music
Este Si Que es el Gran Combo	1969	Gema Records/ Viva Combo Music
Años De Andy Montañez	1969	Gema Records/ Viva Combo Music
Aquí Está Pellín Rodríguez	1969	Gema Records/ Viva Combo Music
Estamos Primeros	1970	EGC Records
De Punta a Punta	1971	EGC Records
Por el Libro	1972	EGC Records
En Acción	1973	EGC Records
5	1973	EGC Records
Disfrútelo Hasta el Cabo!	1974	EGC Records
7	1975	EGC Records
Los Sorullos	1975	EGC Records
Mejor Que Nunca	1976	EGC Records
Internacional	1977	EGC Records
En Las Vegas	1978	EGC Records
¡Aquí No Se Sienta Nadie!	1979	Combo Records
Unity	1980	Combo Records
Happy Days	1981	Combo Records
Nuestro Aniversario	1982	Combo Records
20th Anniversary	1982	Combo Records
La Universidad de la Salsa	1983	Combo Records
In Alaska: Breaking The Ice	1984	Combo Records
Innovations	1985	Combo Records
Nuestra Música	1985	Combo Records
Y Su Pueblo	1986	Combo Records
25th Anniversary	1987	Combo Records
Romántico y Sabroso	1988	Combo Records
¡Ámame!	1989	Combo Records
Latin Up!	1990	Combo Records
Erupción	1991	Combo Records
¡Gracias!: 30 Años de Sabor	1992	Combo Records
30 Aniversario: Bailando Con el Mundo	1992	Combo Records
First Class International	1993	Combo Records
Puerto Rico: La Ruta del Sabor	1994	Combo Records
Para Todos los Gustos	1995	Fonovisa Records
The Best	1995	Sony Discos Norte
Por Todo lo Alto	1996	Fonovisa Records
35th Anniversary: 35 Years Around The World	1997	Combo Records
Pasaporte Musical	1998	Combo Records
Nuevo Milenio: El Mismo Sabor	2001	Combo Records
40 Aniversario en Vivo	2002	BMG
Salsa Classics Revisited- The Re-Mixes	2003	Combo Records
Estamos Aquí...¡Y de Verdad!	2004	Sony Discos Norte
Arroz Con Habichuela	2006	Sony Discos Norte
From the Beginning- 45 years Of Music	2008	Combo Records
Sin Salsa No Hay Paraíso	2010	Sony Discos Norte
50 Years of The Greatest Christmas Hits 1962 thru 2012	2012	Combo Records
50 Anos De Historia	2012	Gema Records / Viva Combo Music
50 Aniversario, Vol. 1	2013	EGC Records
Aqui Esta El Reencuentro with Andy Montanez	2014	Combo Records
Aqui Estoy Yo. Vol. 1- Charlie Aponte Exitos	2015	Combo Records
Alunizando	2016	EGC Records
En Cuarentena	2021	EGC Records

== Billboard Hot Latin Songs ==
El Gran Combo de Puerto Rico have had 22 entries in the Billboard Hot Latin Songs chart:

- 1986: Por Ella (#12)
- 1986: Garantia (#13)
- 1987: Nunca Fui (#35)
- 1987: Mima (#43)
- 1988: Cupido (#8)
- 1988: Quince Años (#26)
- 1988: Porto Amarrao (#28)
- 1989: Amame (#8)
- 1989: Aguacero (#12)
- 1990: Mi Niña (#27)
- 1990: Otra Vez Enamorado (#36)
- 1990: Compañera Mia (#14)
- 1990: Latin Up (#34)
- 1991: La Curandera (#23)
- 1991: Agua Pasada (#30)
- 1992: Te Quiero Porque Quiero (#31)
- 1992: Los Tenis (#31)
- 1993: Te Deseo (#35)
- 1995: No Digas Que No (#25)
- 2001: Me Libere (#11)
- 2003: Se Nos Perdio el Amor (#44)
- 2005: El Matrimonio (#47)

== Current members ==
=== Singers ===
- Jerry Rivas (1977–present)
- Anthony Garcia (2015–present)
- Joselito Hernández (2017–present)

=== Orchestra ===
- Freddie Miranda - lead alto saxophone (1980-present)
- José “Lenny” Prieto - piano (2022-present)
- Julio “Julito” Alvarado - trumpet (2022–present)
- Carlos M. Vargas - trumpet (2016-present)
- Moisés Nogueras - trombone (1991–present)
- Freddy Rivera - double bass (1989–present)
- Domingo "Cuqui" Santos - timbales (1988–present)
- Miguel "Pollo" Torres - conga (1979–present)
- Richie Bastar - bongo (1999–present)
- Josué Urbina - saxophone (2021–present)
- Jorge Torres - sound engineer
- David Marrero - support personnel

== Former members ==
=== Singers ===
- Pellín Rodríguez (1962–1972) (deceased)
- Andy Montanez (1962–1977)
- Charlie Aponte (1973–2014)
- Luis "Papo" Rosario (1980–2019)(deceased)
- Marcos Montañez (1972–1973) (deceased)
- Chiquitín Garcia (1962)
- Daniel Vazquez (1962) (deceased)
- Joseito Mateo (1962) (deceased)

=== Percussion ===
- Milton Correa - timbales (1962–1970)
- Miguel Malaret Marrero - timbales (1970–1979) (deceased)
- Edgardo Morales - timbales (1979–1988) (deceased)
- Roberto Roena - bongos (1962–1969) (deceased)
- Martín Quiñones - conga (1962–1977) (deceased)
- Martín Quiñones, Jr. - conga (1977–1979)
- Daniel "Maninin" Vazquez Verdejo - bongos (1962) (deceased)
- Baby Serrano - bongos (1969–1984) (deceased)
- Michell Laboy - bongos (1984–2001) (deceased)

=== Bass ===
- Miguel Cruz - bass guitar (1962–1975) (deceased)
- Fernando Perez - bass guitar (1975–1989)
- Jaime Valentin - bass guitar (1995–1997)

=== Brass section ===
- Eddie "La Bala" Perez - alto saxophone (1962–2013) (deceased)
- Victor Perez - trumpet (1962-1972)
- José "Keko" Duchesne - saxophone (1969–1980) (deceased)
- Epifanio "Fanny" Ceballos - trombone (1971-1991) (deceased)
- Toñito Vázquez - trombone (1991) (deceased)
- Nelson Feliciano - trumpet (1979–1980)
- Gerardo "Grillo" Cruz - trumpet (1969–1979) (deceased)
- Elias Lopez - trumpet (1964–1969) (deceased)
- Víctor “Cano“ E. Rodríguez - trumpet (1980–2015) (deceased)
- Luis "Taty" Maldonado - trumpet (1971-2022)
- Virgil Rivera - alto saxophone (2013-2021)

=== Others ===
- Hector Santos (1962–1969) (deceased)
- Rogelio "Kito" Vélez (1962–1964) (deceased)
- Mickey Duchesne (1962–1969)
- Edwin Cortés (1969)
- Edwin Gonzalez (1979)
- Tommy Sánchez (1969)
- Mike Ramos - choreographer, chorus (1969–1980)
- Paquito Guzman - chorus, recording sessions (1971–1976) (deceased)
- Elliot Romero - chorus, recording sessions (1973–1977) (deceased)
- Eladio "Yayo El Indio" Peguero - chorus, recording sessions (1977–1979) (deceased)
- Tito Henriquez - chorus, recording sessions (1978)
- Eddie W. Feyjoo - trumpet, recording sessions (1980)
- Willie Sotelo - piano (2006 - 2022) (deceased)
- Rafael Ithier - leader, director (1926–2025); piano (1962-2006) (deceased)

== See also ==
- List of Puerto Ricans

== Bibliography ==
- Keeling, Stephen: Rough Guides, Rough Guides, 2008, ISBN 978-1-85828-354-8
- Marino, John: Wiley Publishing Inc., 2008, ISBN 978-0-470-25711-1
- Let's Go Inc: MacMillan, 2007, ISBN 978-0-312-37447-1 Third Edition
- Peffer, Randal: Lonely Planet Publications Pty Ltd, 2002, ISBN 978-1-74059-274-1
