= Roberto Roena =

Puerto Rican musician (1940–2021)

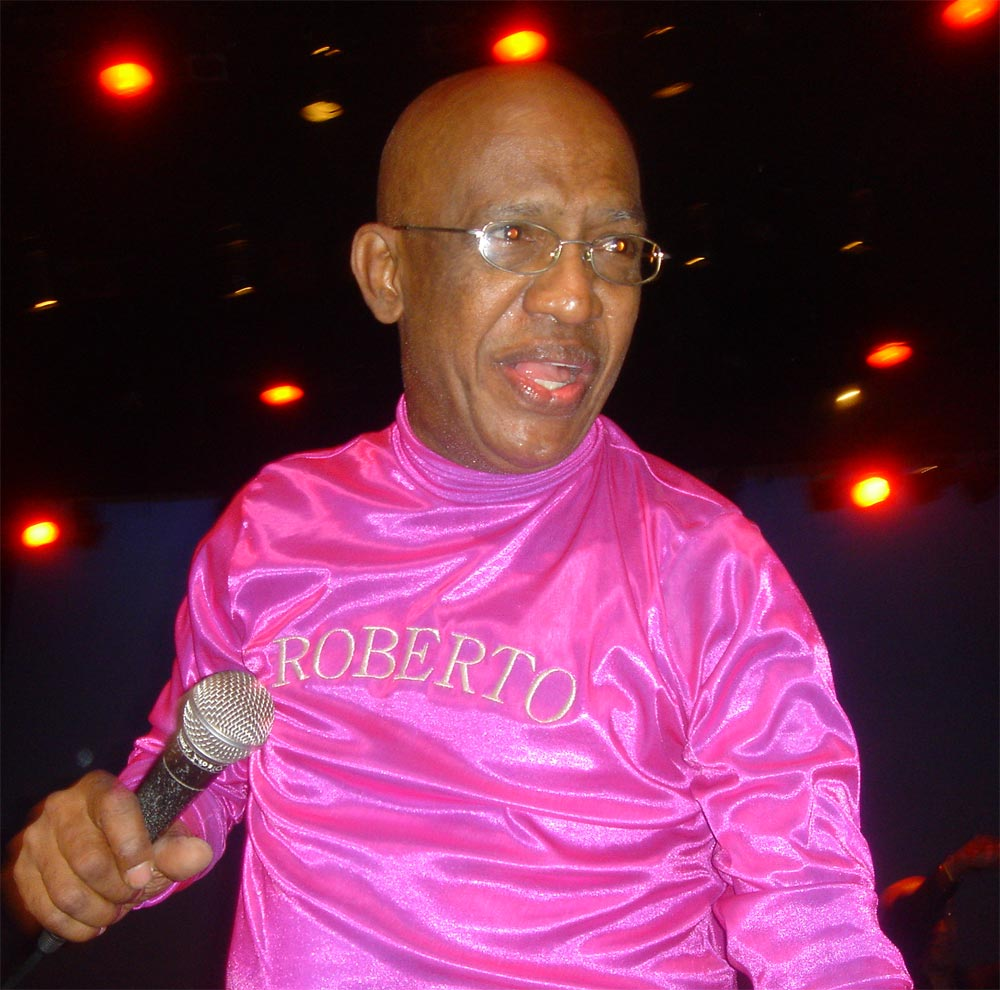
- Roena in 2011

Background information
- Also known as: "El Gran Bailarín" ("The Great Dancer")
- Born: January 16, 1940; Mayagüez, Puerto Rico
- Died: September 23, 2021 (aged 81) Carolina, Puerto Rico
- Formerly of: El Gran Combo de Puerto Rico; Cortijo y Su Combo; Fania All-Stars; Roberto Roena y Su Apollo Sound

Roberto Roena Vázquez (January 16, 1940 – September 23, 2021) was a Puerto Rican salsa music percussionist, orchestra leader, and dancer. Roena was one of the original members of Cortijo y Su Combo and later with El Gran Combo de Puerto Rico. He later became the leader of his own band, "Roberto Roena y Su Apollo Sound", widely considered one of the best Latin salsa bands in Puerto Rico. Roena had also been a long-time member of the Fania All Stars, a salsa supergroup that has enjoyed worldwide success since the 1970s.

== Early career ==
Roberto Roena (left) and Puerto Rican salsa DJ Yun Yun Echevarria at Radio Voz, Carolina, Puerto Rico (1980s)

Born in the Dulces Labios neighborhood of Mayagüez, Roena took his first steps in the art of dance by staging dance routines with his brother Cuqui at his hometown. When Roberto was nine years old, his family settled in Santurce, where the brothers continued to refine their mambo and cha-cha-chá routines, delighting their public in talent contests. This led to their contract of weekly performances on the television program “La Taberna India” on WKAQ-TV. During the broadcasts, percussionist Rafael Cortijo saw Roena in action. Roena, aside from being a dancer, was a talented at playing percussion conga drum. Rafael Cortijo took him under his wing and taught him how to play bongos, later to become the bongo player for his band. He also played occasional baseball.

== Cortijo y Su Combo ==
When Roberto was 16 years old, Cortijo was in need of a bongo player for a group that he was forming. Visualizing a bongo player that could dance and play the cowbell at the same time, Cortijo recruited Roberto to join his new band, and personally taught Roberto how to play both instruments. The group's name derived from the name of an existing band named "El Combo" in which many of the original band members had been involved. For seven years, Roena was part of Cortijo’s group and his Combo, with Ismael Rivera as vocalist. With that lineup, they toured the major stages of the United States, Europe, and South America. Cortijo y Su Combo, mostly made up of Afro–Puerto Ricans, was the first of its kind to succeed in gaining access to the stages where only white artists were performing, within and outside of Puerto Rico.

== El Gran Combo ==
The Combo’s good fortune ended with the arrest of its star singer, Ismael Rivera, for charges of drug possession. With the absence of “El Sonero Mayor,” Cortijo’s musicians discussed the possibility of remaining together. Some members of the group chose to distance themselves from their imprisoned lead singer, and "El Gran Combo" was born. Out of gratitude and loyalty to Rafael Cortijo, his mentor, Roena did not join the new Combo immediately. Eventually Cortijo left for New York in search of new musicians, and after nine months, Roberto, who had stayed in Puerto Rico, decided to join "El Gran Combo" which was then led by pianist Rafael Ithier.

El Gran Combo became the new sensation in Latin music, and Roena was part of the group until 1969. Wanting to establish his own salsa orchestra, Roberto formed “Los Megatones” in 1967, playing Latin Jazz Wednesday nights at a local club. Two years after forming "Los Megatones", as a result of personal differences with Andy Montañez, one of "El Gran Combo's" vocalists, Roberto left "El Gran Combo".

== Roberto Roena y su Apollo Sound ==
In 1969, he went on to form a band by the name of "Roberto Roena y Su Apollo Sound", arguably one of the best Latin salsa bands in Puerto Rico. Roberto Roena’s new orchestra was baptized "El Apollo Sound" because the launch of NASA's Apollo 11 lunar mission coincided with the day of the band’s first rehearsal. The band eventually recorded hits such as Y Tu Loco Loco, Traicion, Que Se Sepa and Herencia Rumbero.

Roberto Roena was also a long-time member of the Fania All Stars, the showcase group for the Fania Records label, which has enjoyed worldwide success since the 1970s. He recorded his signature song, "Coro Miyare", with the group; live performances of the song featured Roena playing the bongos and dancing with his uncle, legendary salsa dancer Aníbal Vázquez, in a choreographed section that almost always received standing ovations from the audience.

Roena took a giant step in the fusion of salsa with jazz, in the 1970s, by joining forces with African superstar saxophonist Manu Dibango of "Soul Makossa" fame.

Despite not having formal musical training, Roena collaborated with numerous musicians and arrangers. Apollo Sound included members from the ensembles of Tito Puente, Cortijo y Su Combo, El Gran Combo, and Los Sunsets. Arrangers and composers for his repertoire included Mario Ortiz, Bobby Valentín, Elias Lopés, Luis “Perico” Ortiz, and Papo Lucca. With Apollo Sound, Roena introduced a salsa sound utilizing two trumpets, a trombone, and a saxophone, influenced by the wind section of the rock group Blood, Sweat and Tears.

Roberto always considered variety as the key to success, leading him to include in his musical repertoire everything from go-go to the romantic, the same in English as in Spanish. Roberto Roena and his Apollo Sound’s first album produced hits of great impact like “Tú loco loco y yo tranquilo,” “El escapulario,” and “El sordo.” In fact, it was Apollo Sound who popularized the Bobby Capó classic, “Soñando con Puerto Rico.”

Apollo Sound recorded under the label International Records (a subsidiary of Fania) for a decade, in which they harvested successes like “Traición,” “Chotorro,” “Mi Desengaño,” “Fea,” “Marejada feliz,” “Cui cui,” and “El progreso,” among others. His popularity on the radio waves accompanied tours around the United States and Latin America.

Complementing the musicality of the salsa group was always the showmanship inherent in Roberto Roena. Dying his hair in new colors, playing percussion in his underwear and sporting a harness so he could “fly” around the stage of New York City's Madison Square Garden were some of the tricks that he used to stand out among the other groups in vogue. In fact, a noted journalist that followed Apollo Sound once remarked that they were “the first group in Puerto Rico with a system of psychedelic lights and go-go girls.”

Beginning in the 1980s, Roberto Roena and his Apollo Sound experienced a fade in popularity, reflecting a crisis that was sweeping through the salsa movement in general. Nevertheless, Roberto maintained himself by collaborating and recording independently with local groups. In 1990, Roena tried to revive the concept of Apollo Sound. He opened a concert for British rock singer Sting at the Coliseo Roberto Clemente, where he presented his hit salsa version of "Every Breath You Take" (with an amused Sting watching from the sidelines).

In 1994, he celebrated 25 years with his orchestra in a successful concert at the Centro de Bellas Artes in San Juan. This performance was recorded and released, validating his music for a new generation.

Roena was inducted into the International Latin Music Hall of Fame in 2003.

== Personal life ==
Roena was born in barrio Dulces Labios in Mayagüez on January 16, 1940. His parents were Raquel María Vázquez Plaza and Francisco Roena. Roena had two daughters, Brenda and Gladys and two sons, Ivan and Francisco. Roena died in a hospital in Carolina, Puerto Rico on September 23, 2021, after suffering a heart attack. He was buried at Monte Calvario Cemetery in Caguas, Puerto Rico

== Discography ==
=== Solo ===
- 1966 - Se Pone Bueno
- 1980 - Que Suerte He Tenido de Nacer
- 1980 - Looking Out For Numero Uno
- 1982 - Super Apollo 47-50 with Adalberto Santiago
- 1990 - New Decade
- 2006 - Señor Bongo

=== With the Apollo Sound ===
- 1970 - 1
- 1970 - 2
- 1972 - 3
- 1972 - 4
- 1973 - 5
- 1974 - 6
- 1974 - Pa' Fuera
- 1976 - Lucky 7
- 1977 - La 8va. Maravilla
- 1977 - 9
- 1978 - Apollo Sound 10: El Progreso
- 1980 - Gold
- 1985 - Afuera y Contento
- 1987 - Regreso
- 1994 - El Pueblo Pide Que Toque
- 1994 - The Fania Legends of Salsa Collection
- 1996 - Mi Musica Mil Novecientos Noventa Siete

== See also ==
- List of Puerto Ricans
