= Rafael Ithier =

Puerto Rican musician (1926–2025)

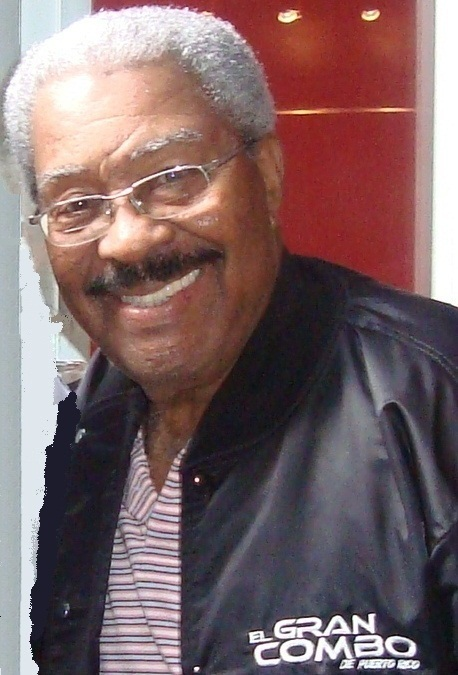

Background information
- Born: 29 August 1926; Puerta de Tierra, San Juan, Puerto Rico
- Died: 6 December 2025 (aged 99) Bayamón, Puerto Rico
- Genres: Salsa; son montuno
- Occupation: Musician
- Years active: 1945–2025
- Labels: Combo; Tico; Fania; Columbia

Rafael Ithier Natal (29 August 1926 – 6 December 2025) was a Puerto Rican salsa musician and the founder of the highly successful orchestra El Gran Combo.

== Early life ==
Ithier was born in the Puerta de Tierra neighborhood of San Juan, Puerto Rico, on 29 August 1926. Raised in Río Piedras, Puerto Rico, he showed a passion for music at a very young age. His father was Nicolas Ithier and his mother Mérida Natal. His uncle, Salvador Ithier, played music together with Rafael Hernández, another of Puerto Rico's music legends. He enlisted in the United States Army during the Korean War. While stationed in Korea he formed a music group entitled the Los Borinqueneers Mambo Boys.

== Musical career ==
Ithier Natal became an expert guitarist in the bolero genre, and he was a member of the Tito Henriquez group, Taone. His sister Esperanza later inspired him to learn how to play the piano.

Ithier Natal and his namesake, Rafael Cortijo, knew each other and formed a friendship at an early age; rumors of animosity would later surface but they both denied it, saying they considered themselves to be "like brothers". Ithier Natal joined Cortijo's orchestra, "Cortijo y su Combo", during the 1950s.

In 1977, Ithier Natal worked as a music arranger on the debut album for the Puerto Rican ensemble band "Puerto Rico All Stars".

In 2000, Ithier Natal was inducted to the International Latin Music Hall of Fame.

=== El Gran Combo ===
In 1962, Ithier Natal formed "El Gran Combo de Puerto Rico", becoming the orchestra's leader. Until his death, he was the orchestra leader and continued to tour with the group. On his 90th birthday, he was interviewed and stated that El Gran Combo was successful because of their great discipline.

== Personal life and death ==
Ithier was married and had five children. His father died when Rafael was eight years old.

Ithier died at his home in Bayamón, Puerto Rico, of natural causes, on 6 December 2025, at the age of 99. He was buried at Cementerio Los Cipreses in Bayamón, Puerto Rico.

== See also ==
- List of Puerto Ricans
- Guaguancó
- Son cubano
- Salsa
- Afro-Cuban jazz
