= Johnny Colon =

American musician

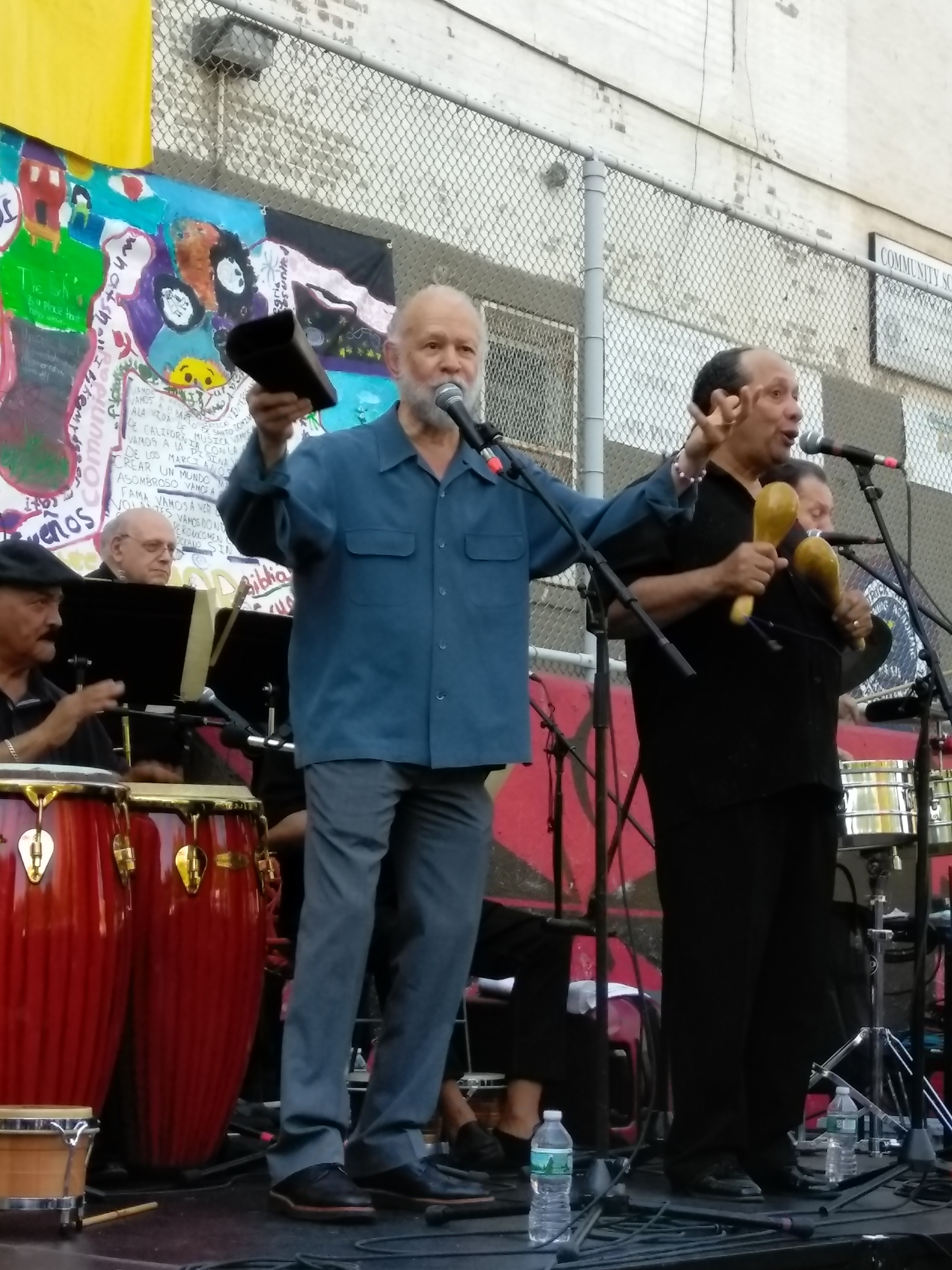
Johnny Colon in El Barrio in Spanish Harlem, NYC

Johnny Colon is an American salsa musician, leader of the Johnny Colon Orchestra and founder of the East Harlem Music School, also known as a major contributor to the boogaloo sound of the 1960s.

Colon was born in New York City to parents of Puerto Rican heritage. He wrote most of the Orchestra's tunes, sings, plays percussion, piano and trombone, and first found success in the world of salsa with his 1967 debut album, Boogaloo Blues. The record was produced by George Goldner and sold around three million copies worldwide. He released five albums over the period 1967-72, and in 1968 founded the East Harlem Music School. His 2008 album "Keeping It Real" features the American pop songbook.

== Discography ==
- Boogaloo Blues (Cotique Records, 1967)
- Boogaloo '67 (Cotique, 1967)
- Move Over (Cotique, 1968)
- Portrait of Johnny (Cotique, 1971)
- Hot! Hot! Hot! (Caliente de Vicio) (Cotique, 1972)
- Tierra Va a Temblar (Cotique, 1975)
- Johnny Colon's Disco Hits: Soul & Latin (Cotique, 1976)
- Keeping It Real (2008)
