= Tito Rodríguez =

Puerto Rican singer and bandleader (1923–1973)

Background information
- Also known as: El Inolvidable
- Born: Pablo Rodríguez Lozada; January 4, 1923; Santurce, Puerto Rico
- Died: February 28, 1973 (aged 50) New York City, U.S.
- Genres: Mambo, cha-cha-cha, bolero, pachanga, guaracha
- Occupations: Musician, bandleader, composer, arranger, television host, producer
- Instruments: Vocals, timbales, maracas, guiro
- Years active: 1936–1973
- Labels: RCA Victor, Tico, Alegre, United Artists, Musicor, TR Records, West Side Latino

Pablo Rodríguez Lozada (January 4, 1923 – February 28, 1973), better known as Tito Rodríguez, was a Puerto Rican singer and bandleader. He started his career singing under the tutelage of his brother, Johnny Rodríguez. In the 1940s, both moved to New York, where Tito worked as a percussionist in several popular rhumba ensembles, before directing his own group to great success during the 1950s. His most prolific years coincided with the peak of the mambo and cha-cha-cha dance craze. He also recorded boleros, sones, guarachas and pachangas.

Rodríguez is known by many fans as "El Inolvidable" (The Unforgettable One), a moniker based on his most popular song, a bolero written by Cuban composer Julio Gutiérrez.

== Early years ==
Tito Rodríguez was born in Barrio Obrero, Santurce, Puerto Rico, to José Rodríguez Fuentes, a construction worker from San Sebastián, Puerto Rico and Severina Lozada from Holguín, Cuba. During his childhood he aspired to be a jockey and tried out racing horses at Hipódromo Las Casas in Villa Palmera, Santurce. His older brother, Johnny Rodríguez was a popular singer and composer, who inspired the younger Rodríguez to become a musician. In 1936, 13-year-old Rodríguez joined the group of Ladislao (El Maestro Ladí) Martínez, Conjunto de Industrias Nativas, as a singer. When he was 16 years old, he participated in a recording with the renowned Cuarteto Mayarí. In 1940, Rodríguez moved to New York City shortly after his parents, José and Severina, died. He went to live with his brother Johnny, who had been living there since 1935.

== Musical career ==
=== Beginnings as a musician ===
In New York, Rodríguez was hired as a singer and bongó player for the orchestra of Eric Madriguera. In 1941, he recorded "Amor Guajiro", "Acércate Más" (Come Closer) and "Se Fue la Comparsa". In 1942, Rodríguez joined the band of Xavier Cugat, and recorded "Bim, bam, bum" and "Ensalada de congas" (Conga Salad).

Rodríguez joined and served in the U.S. Army for one year. After he was discharged, he returned to New York where he joined the orchestra of José Curbelo. On one occasion, the band performed at the China Doll Cabaret. There he met a young Japanese chorus girl by the name of Tobi Kei (b. Takeko Kunimatsu), who eventually became his wife.

=== Success as a bandleader ===
In 1947, Rodríguez made his "solo" debut and finally organized his own band, which he named "Los Diablos del Mambo" ("the mambo devils"). He renamed his band "Los Lobos del Mambo" ("the mambo wolves") and later dropped the name altogether, deciding to go with "The Tito Rodríguez Orchestra". The first song that he recorded under the band's new name which became a "hit" was "Bésame La Bembita" (Kiss My Big Lips). In 1952, he was honored for having developed his own unique singing style (early in his career he had been heavily influenced, as had so many other singers, by the Cuban vocalist Miguelito Valdés) by the "Century Conservatory of Music of New York". His orchestra won the "Gran Trofeo Award" for two consecutive years.

In 1953, Rodríguez heard a percussionist by the name of Cheo Feliciano. He was so impressed with Feliciano that he offered him a job in his band as a band boy. Rodríguez discovered that Feliciano also knew how to sing and gave him an opportunity to sing at the popular Palladium Ballroom. Eventually, Feliciano went to work for another band, but the friendship between the two lasted for the rest of their lives. Among the other orchestras that played at the Palladium were the Machito, Tito Puente and Charlie Palmieri orchestras. The popular Latin music craze at the time was the chachachá and the mambo.

At the peak of his popularity during the 1950s, Rodríguez was only rivalled by Tito Puente in New York's Latin music circuit. Although described by historians and musicians alike (including both Titos) as "a friendly rivalry", their purported feud became a sort of urban legend in the world of Latin dance music. For example, Rodríguez's version of "Avísale a mi contrario" has been often cited as an example of this "feud", despite the fact that the song was written by Ignacio Piñeiro in 1906.

=== United Artists years ===
Rodríguez tried his luck with boleros and recorded various albums for the United Artists label, spawning various hit songs such as "Inolvidable", composed by Julio Gutiérrez, and "En la soledad", composed by Puchi Balseiro. "Inolvidable" sold over a million and a half copies world-wide in 1963. In his early 1960s orchestra his group included Cuban dancer Martha Correa, who also played the maracas. In this period he also collaborated with mainstream American jazz artists. Notably, he invited jazz players Bob Brookmeyer, Al Cohn, Zoot Sims and Clark Terry to appear with him in performances at New York City's famed Birdland nightclub. Highlights of the performances were captured on the album, Live at Birdland (1963). He also produced records for other groups, such as Los Hispanos and Los Montemar.

== Later years ==
Rodríguez returned to Puerto Rico in 1966 and built a Japanese-style house in Ocean Park, Santurce, where he lived with his family. Rodríguez produced his own television show called "El Show de Tito Rodríguez" which was transmitted through San Juan's television Channel 7 (whose call letters were WRIK-TV at the time). Among the guest stars that appeared on his show were Sammy Davis Jr., Tony Bennett, Shirley Bassey, Roberto Clemente and Orlando Cepeda. Rodríguez also founded his own recording studio/label called TR Records.

Rodríguez's last public appearance was with Machito and his band on February 2, 1973, at Madison Square Garden in New York City.

Tito Rodríguez died of leukemia on February 28, 1973.

== Legacy ==
In April 1999, Tito Rodríguez was represented by his son, Tito Rodríguez Jr., in the induction ceremonies of the International Latin Music Hall of Fame.

Tito Rodríguez's Japanese-style house in Puerto Rico is featured on tours of the San Juan metropolitan area. The aforementioned Cheo Feliciano recorded a tribute to Tito Rodríguez honoring his memory and legacy.

In August 2010, Puerto Rican reggae band Cultura Profética released the song "Me faltabas tú" on the album "La Dulzura", where the band plays Tito's song in a modern bolero style.

== Discography ==
Represented by Columbia Records (now Sony International), most of these albums were originally recorded by the Musicor label, which was later sold to West Side Latino records. Tito Rodríguez recorded in the pre-LP era for RCA, He also recorded for Seeco Records, SMC, United Artist Records and his own label, TR records. Many of the United Artists records have been reissued in CD form by Palladium Latin Jazz & Dance Records.

=== with his Orchestra ===
- Mambo Styles (1949)
- Mambos By Tito Rodriguez And His Orchestra Volume One (1951)
- Mambos By Tito Rodriguez And His Orchestra Volume Two (1952)
- Mambos By Tito Rodriguez And His Orchestra Volume Three (1953)
- Mambos By Tito Rodriguez And His Orchestra Volume Four (1954)
- Mambos By Tito Rodriguez And His Orchestra Volume Five (1953)
- Mambos By Tito Rodriguez And His Orchestra Volume Six (1953 or 1954)
- Un Poquito de Mambo (1955)
- Mambo Madness (1956)
- Three Loves Have I (1957)
- The Wa-Pa-Cha (El Guapacha) (1957)
- Señor Tito Rodríguez (1958)
- Latin Jewels (1958)
- Latin Dance Party (1959)
- Tito Rodríguez At The Palladium - LIVE! Performance (1960)
- Motion Picture Themes Cha Cha Cha (1961)
- Charanga Pachanga (1961)
- Returns To The Palladium- Live (1961)
- Latin Twist (1962)
- Back Home In Puerto Rico (1962)
- Let's Do The Bossa Nova (1962)
- West Side Beat (1962)
- From Hollywood (1963)
- In Puerto Azul, Venezuela (1963)
- Live At Birdland (1963)
- Carnival Of The Americas (1964)
- Tito Rodríguez Presents Vitin Aviles (1964)
- Tito Rodríguez Presents Nelson Pinedo – A Latin In America (1964)
- Aqui Estan Los Montemar (1964) with Los Montemar Quartet
- Tito Rodríguez Presents The Fabulous Los Hispanos Quartet (1965)
- Siempre Pensando En Ti (Always Thinking Of You) (1965) with Los Hispanos Quartet
- My Heart Sings For You (Mi Corazon Te Canta) (1965)
- Tito, Tito, Tito (1965)
- Tito No. 1 (1965)
- Fiesta De Las Américas (1965)
- Te Amo with Los Hispanos Quartet (1967)
- Big Band Latino (Esta Es Mi Orquesta) Featuring Victor Paz (1968)

=== Solo ===
- From Tito With Love (1963)
- More Amor (1964)
- La Romantica Voz De Tito Rodriguez El Piano Artistico De Jose Melis (1965) with José Melis
- En Escenario (1966)
- Latin Songs Of Love (1966)
- I'll Always Love You (1967 or 1964)
- Este Es Mi Mundo (1968)
- Estoy Como Nunca (1968)
- El Doctor del Amor (1968)
- Canta En La Oscuridad (1968)
- Yo Soy Tu Enamorado (1968)
- Mi Razon: Amarte (1969)
- Un Lugar Bajo El Sol (1969)
- Esto Si Esta En Algo (1970) with Los Montemar
- Palladium Memories (1971)
- Tito Dice... Separala Tambien! (1971) with La Playa Sextet
- Inolvidable (1971)
- En Algo Nuevo (1972) with Louie Ramirez
- Tito Rodriguez T.V. Show (1973)
- 25th Anniversary Performance (1973)
- En la Soledad (1973)

== See also ==
- List of Puerto Ricans
- Mambo
