= Ofrenda (Danny Rivera album) =

Studio album by Danny Rivera
- Released: 1987
- Recorded: Melody Recording Studio, Puerto Rico
- Genre: Puerto Rican Folk Music
- Length: 33:25
- Label: Alpha Records
- Producer: Danny Rivera, José Gonzalez

Danny Rivera chronology
Controversia (1985)	Ofrenda (1987)	Mi Canción Es Paz (1987)

Ofrenda (Offering) is a Puerto Rican Christmas music and Puerto Rican folk music album by Danny Rivera. Released in 1987, the album was Rivera's second Christmas album. As special guests he reunited legendary local folk group Trio Vegabajeño (Fernandito Alvarez, Benito de Jesús, Pepito Maduro and Jorge Hernandez). Jorge Hernandez was also a member of the group Alpha IV which had been recording with Danny for several years. From his previous album, Controversia he recruited singer Alma Galarza of Vicente Carattini y Los Cantores de San Juan with the condition she quit Los Cantores to join him on lead vocals full-time in the studio and on tour, which she did. Jardinero de Cariños was the biggest hit from the album.

This album was dedicated to Joaquin Muriel.

== Track listing ==
Side A
No.	Title	Lead singer	Length
1.	"Meleque" (Pepito Maduro)	Danny Rivera	3:06
2.	"Jardinero de Cariños" (Angel Morales)	Danny Rivera and Alma Galarza	4:08
3.	"Medley - Trio Vegabajeño" (Guillermo Venegas Lloveras)	Trio Vegabajeño	4:38
4.	"Dios Te Salve Madre" (Mario Enrique)	Danny Rivera	3:40

Side B
No.	Title	Lead singer	Length
1.	"Ponle Por Nombre Jesús" (Mario Enrique)	Danny Rivera	4:19
2.	"El Amor" (Felix Morales Morales)	Danny Rivera	2:41
3.	"Dulce Encuentro" (Felix Morales Morales)	Danny Rivera and Alma Galarza	3:54
4.	"Que Lindas Son Las Mañanas" (Benito de Jesús)	Danny Rivera	3:14
5.	"Piel De Caramelo" (Felix Morales Morales)	Danny Rivera	3:42

== Musicians ==
- Danny Rivera - lead vocals
- Trio Vegabajeño
- Alma Galarza - lead vocals and chorus
- José Gonzalez - Puerto Rican cuatro and guitar
- Modesto Nieves - Puerto Rican cuatro and Venezuelan cuatro
- Javier Hernandez - keyboards and chorus
- Jorge Hernandez - Requinto
- Miguel Cubano - bass
- Alpha IV - chorus
- Alxa Ruiz, Jesús Cordero and Selma Berrios - chorus
- Julio Lugo - percussion

== Production ==
- Musical arrangements: José Gonzalez
- Musical director: José Gonzalez
- Producers - Danny Rivera and Gladys Hernandez
- Recording engineers - Rei Peña and Javier Hernandez
- Mixing - Rei Peña, Javier Hernandez and Danny Rivera
- Album cover design - Heriberto Gonzalez
- Concept: José Gonzalez, Edwin Reyes and Danny Rivera
- Photos: Jochi Melero
- Coordinator: Catalino Figueroa
- Distribution - Alpha Records - DNA Records
