= Alma Galarza =

Puerto Rican singer

- Birth name: Alma Galarza Flores
- Born: Yauco, Puerto Rico
- Genres: Puerto Rican folk, ballads
- Occupation(s): Singer, painter
- Years active: 1977–present

Alma Galarza Flores is a Puerto Rican vocalist best known for her work with Danny Rivera in albums Controversia, Ofrenda and Mi Canción Es Paz. She comes from a family of musicians. One of her biggest inspirations was her aunt, singer Nardy Flores who died at a very young age.

== Vicente Carattini y Los Cantores de San Juan ==
Alma started her career in 1977 with Vicente Carattini y Los Cantores de San Juan as one of the dancers. A few years later after noticing her vocal abilities, Vicente added her to the choir. Eventually she sang several songs as lead vocalist and finally in 1985's Controversia (Danny Rivera and Vicente's group) she did lead vocals with Danny in two songs ("Controversia" and "De Mi Voz Nació La Luz") and did lead vocals by herself on "Plena de los Cantores".

== Danny Rivera ==
Controversia marked the transition of Alma's career from Vicente Carattini's group to working with Danny. After falling in love with her voice, Danny Rivera offered to bring her with him to record albums and to go on tour but with the condition that she quit Los Cantores. Her first album as a soloist was Ofrenda (1986) in which she is the only female soloist. In Dulce Encuentro she sings half the song by herself while in other songs like Jardinero de Cariños she sings lead along with Danny.

Although her last album with Danny was Mi Canción es Paz in 1987 she kept touring with him until 1992.

== Soloist ==
In 1997 Alma released her first ever solo album called "Jájome". Due to poor support by local radio stations her album didn't sell too well. However, in 2009, TV producer Javier Avilés heard and loved the album and decided he wanted to make a TV special about it for Christmas. The special included 7 of the 8 songs from the album and was first broadcast on Telemundo Puerto Rico and Puerto Rico TV in 2013.

Alma will begin recording her second solo album in late 2014.

== Matrimonio Musical ==
For several years Alma has been playing in duet Matrimonio Musical with guitarist Luis "Cholo" Rivera. They play mostly cover songs of several genres including Puerto Rican folk, ballads, merengue, salsa, among others. They also have some original material and an album is due to be released in 2014.

== Discography ==
=== With Vicente Carattini y Los Cantores de San Juan ===
- Vicente Carattini y Los Cantores De San Juan (1978)
- Dame la Mano Paloma (1979)
- De Rolimpín / Pidiendo posada (1980)
- Celebrando Su Decimo Aniversario (1971)
- La Piña Esta Agria (1982)
- Escóndete (1983)
- 15 Exitos Navideños y un Estreno (1983)

=== With Danny Rivera ===
- Controversia (1985)
- Ofrenda (1986)
- Mi Canción es Paz (1987)

=== Solo ===
- Jájome (1997)
