= Nuestro Juramento =

"Nuestro juramento"

Single by Julio Jaramillo

from the album Nuestro juramento
- B-side: "Yo no dije nada"
- Released: 1957
- Recorded: 1956
- Genre: Bolero
- Label: Ónix
- Songwriter: Benito de Jesús

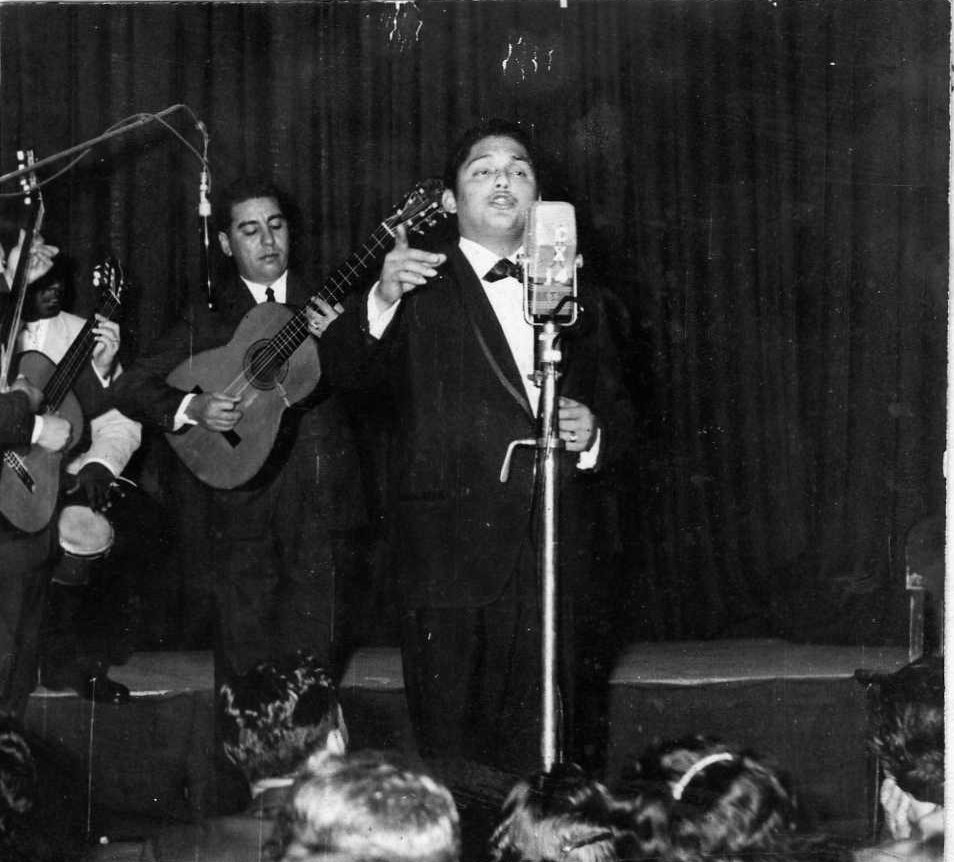
Nuestro Juramento was the signature song of singer Julio Jaramillo.

"Nuestro juramento" (English: "Our oath") is a bolero by Puerto Rican songwriter Benito de Jesús and popularized throughout Latin America by Ecuadorian singer Julio Jaramillo. Jaramillo's original recording of the song was made in 1956, featuring Rosalino Quintero on requinto guitar, and released in 1957 by Ónix. The lyrics are written from the perspective of the speaker being a lover singing to their beloved. They worry their beloved may be saddened by some sort of doubt that they feel in regards to the oath they made to love each other always. The speaker reassures them that they have sworn to love each other, to be faithful to each other, so much so that if an after life exists, they vow to love each other then too; the speaker goes on to say if they die first, the other promises to spill all their own tears over the speakers' corpse and to make sure everyone knows about their love, and if the other dies first, the speaker promises to write the story of their love with metaphorical bloody ink straight from their own heart. This way, the story of their love and devotion will live on regardless of death because it is their vow, their juramento.

Nuestro juramento is the most popular song in the history of Ecuador, especially in Guayaquil, where Julio Jaramillo was from. However, most Ecuadorians are unaware that it was written by someone outside their country.

Benito de Jesús was said to have received royalties from "Nuestro juramento". Every 6 months, he received royalties from different countries.

== Other versions ==
Many singers have sung versions of "Nuestro juramento", including Ecuadorian singer Olimpo Cárdenas, Colombian singers Charlie Zaá and Alci Acosta, Peruvian singer Tania Libertad, Puerto Rican singer Daniel Santos, Puerto Rican singer José Feliciano, and the Mexican groups Los Baby's and Café Tacvba. The latter was in the soundtrack of the movie Crónicas, directed by Sebastián Cordero.
