= Latin Songwriters Hall of Fame =

Hall of fame for Latin songwriters

Latin Songwriters Hall of Fame Spanish: El Pabellón de la Fama de los Compositores Latinos
- Established: October 18, 2012; 13 years ago
- Location: 1688 Meridian Avenue; 6th & 7th Floor; Miami, Florida
- Coordinates: 25°47′31″N 80°08′13″W
- Type: Hall of fame
- Founders: Desmond Child and Rudy Pérez
- President: Marti Cuevas
- Website: Official website

The Latin Songwriters Hall of Fame (LSHOF) (Spanish: El Pabellón de la Fama de los Compositores Latinos) also known as La Musa Awards, was established on October 18, 2012, by Desmond Child and Rudy Pérez, and is located in Miami, Florida, United States. The hall of fame is dedicated to "educating, honoring and celebrating the lives and music of the world's greatest Latin songwriters and composers". The hall of fame was conceived by Child after he realized that he was only the third Latino to be inducted into the Songwriters Hall of Fame. Pérez came up with the same idea after having discussions with Latin composers Manuel Alejandro and Armando Manzanero 16 years prior to its conception. Initially, the organization had only 119 participants which grew to over 15,000 members in two years from 21 Spanish- and Portuguese-speaking countries across Latin America, Europe, and the US. Nominations for the inductions are selected by its committee of music professionals, which consists of producers, composers, musicians, and performers, with the winners being voted by the general public. The only exception was for the 2022 inductees. To be eligible for a nomination, the songwriter, composer, or lyricist is required to have their first published work released at least 20 years prior to the year of induction.

The accolades are divided into three groups: inductees, posthumous inductees, and additional honorees. While inductees are selected by an online survey, the posthumous inductees, and special honors are presented by the organization's committee. For the inaugural La Musa Awards, five inductees were selected from 24 nominees of performing and non-performing songwriter categories. The gala took place on April 23, 2013, at the New World Center in Miami Beach. After a two-year absence, the organization celebrated its tenth anniversary in 2022 and inducted both of its founders into the Latin Songwriters Hall of Fame. Since the inception, songwriters originating from Argentina, Brazil, Colombia, Chile, Cuba, the Dominican Republic, Ecuador, El Salvador, Italy, Mexico, Panama, Peru, Puerto Rico, Spain, the US, and Venezuela have been inducted.

== Inductees ==
Key
‡	Indicates non-performing recipient

List of inductees
Year	Image	Inductee	Nationality	Ref.
2013		Manuel Alejandro ‡	Spain	
2013		José Ángel Espinoza ‡	Mexico	
2013		José Feliciano	Puerto Rico	
2013		Julio Iglesias	Spain	
2013		Armando Manzanero	Mexico	
2013		Concha Valdés Miranda	Cuba	
2014	—	Omar Alfanno ‡	Panama	
2014	—	Rafael Pérez Botija ‡	Spain	
2014	—	Lolita de la Colina ‡	Mexico	
2014		Gloria Estefan	Cuba	
2015	—	Héctor Ochoa Cárdenas ‡	Colombia	
2015		Emilio Estefan ‡	Cuba	
2015		Myriam Hernández	Chile	
2015		Gustavo Santaolalla ‡	Argentina	
2015		Álvaro Torres	El Salvador	
2015		Diego Torres	Argentina	
2016	—	Claudia Brant ‡	Argentina	
2016	—	Alejandro Jaén ‡	Spain	
2016		Miguel Luna ‡	Mexico	
2016		Draco Rosa	Puerto Rico	
2016		Los Temerarios	Mexico	
2016	—	Cheo Zorrilla	Dominican Republic	
2017		Erika Ender ‡	Panama	
2017		Ana Gabriel	Mexico	
2017		Roberto Livi ‡	Mexico	
2017		Camilo Sesto	Spain	
2017	—	Martin Urieta	Mexico	
2017		Carlos Vives	Colombia	
2018		Carlos Rubira Infante ‡	Ecuador	
2018	—	Fernando Osorio ‡	Venezuela	
2018		Gloria Trevi	Mexico	
2018		Chucho Valdés	Cuba	
2019		Willie Colón	United States	
2019	—	Armando Larrinaga ‡	Cuba	
2019		Chico Novarro ‡	Argentina	
2019		Ivy Queen	Puerto Rico	
2019		Michael Sullivan ‡	Brazil	
2022		Desmond Child ‡	United States	
2022		Juanes	Colombia	
2022		Rudy Pérez ‡	Cuba; United States	
2022		Tony Renis ‡	Italy	
2024	—	Luny ‡	Puerto Rico	
2024		Julio Reyes Copello ‡	Colombia	
2024		Saúl Hernández	Mexico	
2025		Enrique Bunbury	Spain	
2025	—	Andrés Castro ‡	Colombia	
2025	—	Jorge Luis Piloto ‡	Cuba	
2025	—	Mónica Vélez ‡	Mexico	
2026	—	Danny Daniel	Spain	
2026		Sergio George ‡	United States	
2026	—	Yoel Henríquez ‡	Puerto Rico	
2026		Mario Quintero Lara	Mexico	
2026		Gian Marco	Peru	
2026		Kike Santander ‡	Colombia	

== Posthumous inductees ==
List of posthumous inductees
Year	Image	Inductee	Nationality	Ref.
2013	—	Roberto Cantoral	Mexico	
2014		Carlos Gardel	Argentina	
2014		Antônio Carlos Jobim	Brazil	
2014	—	Agustín Lara	Mexico	
2014		Ernesto Lecuona	Cuba	
2014		Rafael Hernández Marín	Puerto Rico	
2014		Violeta Parra	Chile	
2015		Juan Carlos Calderón	Spain	
2015		Chabuca Granda	Peru	
2015		María Grever	Mexico	
2015		Paco de Lucía	Spain	
2015	—	César Portillo de la Luz	Cuba	
2015		Joan Sebastian	Mexico	
2016		Juan Gabriel	Mexico	
2016	—	Benny Moré	Cuba	
2016		Mariano Mores	Argentina	
2016		Tito Puente	United States	
2016	—	Myrta Silva	Puerto Rico	
2017		Gustavo Cerati	Argentina	
2018	—	René Touzet	Cuba	
2022		Johnny Ventura	Dominican Republic	
2025		Lalo Schifrin	Argentina	

== Honorees ==
=== La Musa Honors ===
The La Musa Honors were only presented in 2013 and were awarded to Olga Guillot, Draco Rosa, Nat King Cole, Desi Arnaz, Ralph S. Peer, Prince Royce, and Natalia Jiménez.

=== Desi Arnaz Pioneer Award (Premio Pionero Desi Arnaz) ===
Named after Cuban musician Desi Arnaz, the award recognizes "trailblazers in contemporary music".

Desi Arnaz Pioneer Award honorees
Year	Recipient	Ref.
2013	Desi Arnaz	
2014	Raul Alarcon Sr.	
2015	Quincy Jones	
2016	Angelo Medina	
2017	Afo Verde	
2018	Eydie Gormé	
2019	Jesús López	
2022	Eddy Cue	
2025	Charles Fox	

=== Icon Award (Premio Icono) ===
Recognition of an artist for their career and musical contribution.

Icon Award honorees
Year	Recipient	Ref.
2014	Alejandro Sanz	
2015	Café Tacuba	
2017	Carlos Vives	
2018	Víctor Manuelle	
2019	Pitbull	
2022	Residente	
2024	Luis Fonsi	

=== Hero's Award (Premio Triunfador) ===
Presented to young musicians "who have reached outstanding achievements in their career while contributing to the development of Latin music".

Hero's Award honorees
Year	Recipient	Ref.
2014	Miguel	
2015	Fonseca	
2016	Yandel	
2017	Wisin	
2018	Gente de Zona	
2024	Luis Figueroa	
2025	Lenny Tavárez	

=== Conqueror Award (Premio Conquistador) ===
Recognition of a musician's "career and important artistic contributions in the Latin music industry".

Conqueror Award honorees
Year	Recipient	Ref.
2014	Jencarlos Canela	
2015	Beto Cuevas	
2016	Yotuel Romero	
2017	Horacio Palencia	
2018	Descemer Bueno	
2019	Luciano Luna	

=== La Musa Elena Casals Award (Premio La Musa Elena Casals) ===
Recognition of "outstanding young talent and achievements in music".

La Musa Elena Casals Award honorees
Year	Recipient	Ref.
2014	Marlow Rosado	
2015	Alejandra Guzmán	
2016	Julieta Venegas	
2017	Ednita Nazario	
2018	Karol G	
2019	Kany García	
2022	Elena Rose	
2024	Ella Bric	
2025	Ángela Aguilar	
2026	Lupita Infante	

=== Publishers Award (Premio Editores Ralph S. Peer) ===
Publishers Award honorees
Year	Recipient	Ref.
2014	Zach Horowitz	
2015	Jose Perdomo	
2016	Jorge Mejia	
2017	Ralph Peer, II	
2018	Alexandra Lioutikoff	
2019	Nestor Casonu	
2022	Gustavo Menendez	
2024	Kathy Spanberger	
2025	Juan Hidalgo and Nelson Estévez	
2026	Marti Cuevas	

=== Living Legend (Leyenda en Vida) ===
Recognition of "artistic contribution, cultural impact, and lasting legacy".

Living Legend honorees
Year	Recipient	Ref.
2013	Andy García	
2015	Emilio Estefan	
2018	Raphael	
2019	José José	
2022	Manuel Alejandro	
2024	Draco Rosa	

=== Founders Award (Premio de Los Fundadores) ===
Founders Award honorees
Year	Recipient	Ref.
2015	John LoFrumento	
2016	Linda Moran	
2018	Karen Sherry	
2019	Dan Warner	
2022	Walter Kolm	
2022	Mike O'Neill	
2026	Beth Matthews	

=== Legacy Award (Premio Legado) ===
Honors "legendary performers who have shined the spotlight on Latin music and culture throughout their distinguished careers".

Legacy Award honorees
Year	Recipient	Ref.
2015	Rita Moreno	
2016	Larry Harlow	
2017	Julio Jaramillo	
2026	Celia Cruz	

=== Towering Song (La Canción de Todos los Tiempos) ===
Towering Songs
Year	Song	Ref.
2014	"El Día Que Me Quieras"	
2015	"Guantanamera"	
2016	"Oye Como Va"	
2017	"La Bamba"	
2018	"Macarena"	
2019	"Suavemente"	
2022	"Feliz Navidad"	
2024	"Conga"	
2025	"El Rey"	

=== Other honorees ===
Special awards to honorees that have only been presented once:

Other honorees
Year	Award	Recipient / Work	Ref.
2013	The Voice of the Muse (La Voz de la Musa)	Olga Tañón	
2016	WorldArts Discovery of the Year	Emily Estefan	
2017	Towering Song (La Canción del Año)	"Despacito"	
2022	Medal of Freedom	"Patria y Vida"	
2024	Medal of Freedom	Olga Guillot	

== Previously nominated artists ==
The following songwriters have been nominated at least once for the Latin Songwriters Hall of Fame, but have yet to be selected as an inductee.

List of inductees
Name	Image	Nationality	No. of noms.	Year(s) nominated	Ref.
Carlos Eleta Almarán	—	Panama	1	2013	
Roberto Angleró	—	Puerto Rico	2	2017, 2018	
Ramón Arcusa	—	Spain	1	2015	
Ricardo Arjona (Note: Ricardo Arjona and Juan Luis Guerra were selected among the nominees in 2014, but because they were unable to attend the ceremony, they have yet to be inducted into the Latin Songwriters Hall of Fame.)		Guatemala	2	2013, 2014	
Armando Avila	—	Mexico	2	2017, 2018	
Rubén Blades		Panama	5	2014, 2015, 2016, 2017, 2019	
Hugo Blanco		Venezuela	1	2013	
Leo Brouwer		Cuba	1	2015	
Chico Buarque		Brazil	1	2013	
Vico C		Puerto Rico	2	2016, 2018	
Jorge Calandrelli	—	Argentina	1	2017	
José María Cano		Spain	1	2016, 2019	
Erasmo Carlos		Brazil	5	2015, 2016, 2017, 2018, 2019	
Roberto Carlos		Brazil	3	2013, 2014, 2015	
Andrés Castro	—	Colombia	1	2019	
Alberto Cortez		Mexico	2	2013, 2014	
Elvis Crespo		Puerto Rico	1	2017	
Oscar D'León		Venezuela	2	2018, 2019	
Daddy Yankee		Puerto Rico	1	2019	
Franco De Vita		Venezuela	2	2014, 2015	
Luis Gómez-Escolar	—	Spain	3	2015, 2018, 2019	
Estéfano	—	Colombia	2	2017, 2019	
Rubén Fuentes		Mexico	2	2014, 2015	
Charly García		Argentina	1	2017	
Guadalupe García García	—	Cuba	1	2019	
Amaury Gutiérrez	—	Mexico	1	2017	
Alejandro Jaén	—	Spain	2	2015, 2016	
João Gilberto		Brazil	2	2013, 2018	
Juan Luis Guerra		Dominican Republic	2	2013, 2014	
Enrique Iglesias		Spain	1	2017	
Carlos Lara	—	Mexico	2	2016, 2017, 2019	
Guillermo De Leon Ruiz	—	Guatemala	1	2018	
Alejandro Lerner		Argentina	2	2016, 2019	
Gian Marco		Peru	1	2014	
Gustavo Marquez	—	Argentina	1	2017	
Pablo Milanés		Cuba	2	2015, 2019	
Rafi Monclova	—	Puerto Rico	2	2013	
Ricardo Montaner		Venezuela	2	2017	
Ednita Nazario		Puerto Rico	1	2015	
Luis Fernanco Ochoa	—	United States	2	2016, 2017	
Fher Olvera		Mexico	1	2017	
Johnny Ortiz	—	Puerto Rico	1	2014	
Johnny Pacheco		Dominican Republic	1	2019	
Jorge Luis Piloto	—	Cuba	2	2014, 2016	
Alberto Plaza	—	Chile	1	2015	
KC Porter		United States	2	2016, 2018	
Chema Purón	—	Spain	1	2015	
A.B. Quintanilla		United States	1	2019	
Rubén Rada		Uruguay	1	2018	
José Antonio Rodríguez	—	Dominican Republic	1	2019	
Joaquín Sabina		Spain	1	2016	
Horacio Salinas		Chile	1	2018	
Chelique Sarabia		Venezuela	5	2013, 2014, 2015, 2016, 2019	
Romeo Santos		United States	1	2017	
Shakira		Colombia	1	2016	
Lalo Schifrin		Spain	3	2013, 2014, 2015	
Joan Manuel Serrat		Spain	4	2013, 2014, 2018, 2019	
Rafael Solano	—	Dominican Republic	2	2014, 2018	
Marco Antonio Solís		Mexico	3	2016, 2017, 2018	
Caetano Veloso		Brazil	3	2015, 2016, 2017	
