= Trio Vegabajeño =

Puerto Rican musical group

El Trio Vegabajeño
- Origin: Vega Baja, Puerto Rico
- Genres: bolero, danza, waltz, tango, guaracha, Puerto Rican folk
- Years active: 1930s-1990s
- Labels: RCA, Marvela, Borinquen, Patty Records, Tecca Records, Ansonia
- Past members: Fernandito Álvarez; Pedro Crespo González; Benito de Jesús; Octavio González; Pepito Maduro; Jorge Hernández; Tatín Vale; Rafael Scharrón; Ricardo Feliú; Rubén Maldonado; Nacho Carrasquillo; Monchito Monge; Guillermo Rivera; Luis Díaz

Trio Vegabajeño was a legendary Puerto Rican popular music trio that existed from the 1930s to the 1990s. This group marked an era of popular music in Puerto Rico, when the genre was widespread in the Americas, they were considered the island's best representatives. Vegabajeño is the demonym for people of the town of Vega Baja, where the first version was organized during the 1930s by Fernandito Álvarez, who eventually disbanded the group due to fatigue and personal commitments. In 1943, the Trio Vegabajeño was reformed by Álvarez at the Tortuguero Military Camp of Vega Baja, after he gathered a few co-workers (Octavio González and Benito de Jesús) to put together a few musical numbers. Rafael Quiñones Vidal played a role in introducing them to the public by including the group in his radio show. Shortly after they recorded their first song "Llanto de mar". At the time only Álvarez and Benito de Jesus did both vocals and guitar while Octavio González only played guitar. En mi Viejo San Juan (lit. "In my Old San Juan") was first recorded by El Trio Vagabajeño in 1943 under the label RCA Victor. The song had an immediate impact and many other versions followed. The composition was written by Puerto Rican composer and singer Noel Estrada and has been translated into various languages. The song is "widely known around the world".

In 1945 Octavio González was drafted for military service and the trio brought Pepito Maduro, also a singer, as the replacement. The group now had an all singers line-up and became pioneers of this new style. Despite beginning as a trio, the group became a quartet in 1952 when Jorge Hernández (requinto player) joined the group. They did not change the name of the group. This was one of their most successful line-up and even though was not the original, it was sometimes referred to as the "original" or "authentic" line-up. After the departure of Jorge and Benito, the trio had different line-ups, which continued performing until the 1990s. In 1986 one of the classic line-ups (Fernandito, Benito, Pepito and Jorge) reunited to record a song ("Medley Trio Vegabajeño") with Danny Rivera for the album Ofrenda. Aside from that, two of the other songs were composed by members of the trio: "Meleque" (by Pepito Maduro) and "Que Lindas Son Las Mañanas" (by Benito de Jesús). Eventually they were recognized as the National Trio of Puerto Rico and on October 26, 1996, a monument was inaugurated in Vega Baja. The group was also popular throughout Latin America and New York, where they first played in 1947 and continued visiting annually for two decades.

== History ==
=== Early years ===
The first version of the trio was completed by Pedro Crespo González and Cruz Negrón, playing mostly tangos, waltz and chacareras. This version participated in radio events like the Concierto de Vanguardia, where they performed in a number of tasks including a guitar duo and the songs "Alma", "La última carta", "Apiádate de mí" and "Corneta China". When they performed, WKAQ was the only commercial station in radio. This original trio was disbanded when Álvarez married. The following lineup included Álvarez as lead singer, first guitar Ramón Antonio Lavandero and third guitar Francisco Pérez, with Mariano Artau serving as their presenter. They joined at Vega Baja and debuted at the Teatro América. After completing a season at the Condado Hotel, Lavandero and Pérez were drafted for military service and their involvement with the group ceased. Drafted himself, Álvarez met De Jesús and González at Camp Tortuguero, with whom he practiced for almost a year before finally finding their definitive rhythm. These rehearsals took place at Álvarez's house and involved practicing different Latin American rhythms.

They made their debut in one of Rafael Quiñones Vidal Sr.'s shows, Tribuna del Arte, which aired trough WNEL. They would later be well regarded among several "graduates" from this program. Despite the show being recorded at San Juan, Rafael Quiñones Jr. decided that the group's name should continue to pay homage to Vega Baja. A notable quirk was that some of their songs were about beaches, such as Playa Vega Baja and Mar Chiquita. Pepito Maduro, previously from Trio Los Gauchos, joined when González was drafted. This version of the Trio Vegabajeño was more adept to perform in a wider variety of rhythms, but always emphasized Puerto Rican composers. They traveled to the Triboro at New York for three consecutive years. They became known throughout Latin America, not only due to being frequent visitors, but also due to their willingness to perform the songs written by composers throughout the region. Despite the name of the group, its members were form different municipalities, Benito was from Barceloneta and Pepito from Humacao. Álvarez first performed as a child, interpreting a tango by Gardel.

=== First decade of the Golden Era ===
When Noel Estrada composed En Mi Viejo San Juan as an homage to his brother on August 23, 1943, RCA Victor was not interested in it due to believing that the lyrics were "too local" for international markets, but Álvarez was insistent on including the song in their repertoire and they threatened with otherwise leaving the label. Their first production was recorded in a small room at San Juan and featured the work of composer Noel Estrada. During World War II, the Trio Vegabajeño was recruited to entertain Puerto Rican soldiers and visit bases throughout the Caribbean for entertainment. They began their artistic career working in radio, night clubs and hotels throughout Puerto Rico. Their musical acts were also presented at the Tres Banderas cinema at San Juan. The group appeared in Diplo's (Ramón Rivero) A mi me matan, pero yo gozo, which was organized at the Teatro Tapia and the University of Puerto Rico (UPR). In March 1945, the Atenas and Roosevelt cinemas exhibited their debut.

At Jack's night clubs they headlined shows during which they were labeled as either "The 3 Gauchos from Puerto Rico" or "Los Charros Puertorriqueños". The Trio Vegabajeño also collaborated with poet Juan Boria in a farewell show for Alicia Bibiloni, who left the local stages to travel abroad. In June 1945, the Trio Vegabajeño performed under the Díaz-Triana duet at Teatro Tapia. They also performed for the Phi Eta Mu fraternity and the Guadalquivir Casino. In August 1945, they once again entertained the troops, this time at Camp O'Reilly. They joined Ruth Fernández for shows held at the Paramount cinema, which were combined with showings of Rudyard Kipling's Jungle Book.

The group was always present in local radio, with their renditions sponsored by the Kofresí rum brand on WIAC and a show for the soldiers taped along Myrtha Silva recurrently airing on WNLL. They played at various locales and social events, including high school class events and the first anniversary of the Savoy Club.

The group performed along Digna Zapata at the Sirocco Club at Río Piedras, in a show held for her birthday. Along Boria, Diplo, Zapata and others, they performed in a homage to Fernández held on October 4, 1945. Within weeks, the Trio Vegabajeño joined Diplo again in another homage, this one for Myrta Silva and held at the Escambrón Beach Club. The group joined Elsa Valladares at the Quadalquivir Beach Casino at Isla Verde. They were contracted for an activity that the Club de Leones held with Michael Holm as a guest. The group finished the initial voting for the 1945 Concurso de Simpatías, a local popularity contest, in the seventh place and as the only group in the Top-10 which was dominated by Myrta Silva. However, within a week they had climbed to the second spot. They finished the contest in that place with 48,100 votes, while Silva gathered 64,700 to retain the top spot throughout the voting. At WIAC, they appeared in a show sponsored by Palo Viejo for the returning Puerto Rican soldiers. This would lay the foundation for the Hora Radial Palo Viejo, which aired on WNEL and WKVM, with the group as its exclusive artists. In December 1945, they participated in a farewell shows for Digna Zapata and Los Kikaros. To close the year, the Trio Vegabajeño joined Elsa Valladares in the anniversary show of the Colonia Hispanoamericana of Bayamón.

To open 1946, they participated in a Three Kings Day show for the Puerto Rican diaspora and transmitted by WNEL and retransmitted by NBC in New York. They also continued participating in civic activities, such as the inauguration of the Club Social Deportivo at Toa Alta. They were contracted for an event held to welcome actress María Antonieta Pons to Puerto Rico by Tropical Films Inc. and senator William Córdova Chirino. In February 1946, the Trio Vegabajeño performed along Juan José Saro in lovak cinemas. In March 1946, the Trio Vegabajeño accompanied Libertad Lamarque in the Teatro La Perla at Ponce, the University of Puerto Rico (UPR) at Río Piedras and Parque Sixto Escobar at Old San Juan.

In March 1946, the Teatro Puerto Rico hosted them and 150 other artists that performed in trios, quartets, duos and singles in a music carnival, an event that lasted three hours. Another concert in this format was organized by the Casino de Comerío the following month. In April 1946, the group performed at the Cobian's theatre chain in a farewell show for Jorge Sareli. The Trio Vegabajeño was among the artists that played during the annual dance of the Sociedad Puertorriqueña de Periodistas, the main association of local press, organized at the Condado Beach Hotel. The group was featured in a space at WNEL which was sponsored by the Casa Riondo hotel, after signing an exclusivity deal with that brand. They hosted two dances that the Casino de Artesanos de Bayamón organized during that municipality's Fiestas Patronales. In July, the Trio Vegabajeño played at the closing of the Fiestas de San Juan Bautista and hosted a gala with Mapy and Fernando Cortés.

On September 5, 1946, the Trio Vegabajeño released a bolero version of "En Mi Viejo San Juan" and "Fichas Negras". They returned to the Cobian's for an homage to Johnny Rodríguez. In October 1946, the Trio Vegabajeño released the criollo song "Pedacito de Borínquen" and the boleros "Locura de amor". The group participated in a farewell activity for Lilliam de Mendoza. They harmonized El Pelotero Estrella de la Semana, a recurrent baseball show recorded at the Teatro Paramount.

Within a month, they released "Amor del Jibarito". Returning to Jack's, they participated in shows headlined by Lilliam de Mendoza and accompanied Aida Luz Vélez. Meanwhile, they retook participation in community events by performing at the Academia San Jorge. Their single "Lo Nuestro Terminó" entered the Puerto Rico Top-10 in late 1946 and remained there for months. On New Year's Eve, the Trio Vegabajeño participated in a concert held at Fort Buchanan and transmitted through WNEL. To open the year, they participated in a farewell homage to Myrta Silva at the Escambrón Beach Club. They performed in similar farewells for Carlos Guilbe, Carlos Acosta and the Cubaney orchestra. In February, they debuted "Fatal delusion" and "Amorcito lindo".

The group participated in a farewell show for Perla Negra at the Club Social Las 3 Palmas at Bayamón. Their single "Lo Nuestro Terminó" entered the Puerto Rico Top-10 in March 1947. In April 1947, the Trio Vegabajeño released the songs "Romance del Campesino" and "Cieo"”. In May they released "No Puedo Encontrarte" and "Canoa".

In May 1947, the Corona Brewing Corporation became the Trio Vegabajeño's sponsor at WNEL, which became known as Concierto De Luxe. During that month, the group also accompanied Ruth Fernández and participated at Estrellas y más Estrellas, both concerts held at San Juan. Meanwhile, "Lo Nuestro Terminó" continued in the Top-10, climbing to the Top-5 by the end of May. During the summer, they presented a show at the Teatro Paramount that preceded "Carrousel" with Buck Canel. The Trio Vegabajeño was invited to a concert held in homage of composser Rafael Hernández Marín at La Fortaleza, where they sang "Preciosa". They later joined him in a show at the Sixto Escobar Stadium. The group also performed in an activity organized by the Attorney General of Puerto Rico, Luis Negrón Fernández for the press and a second activity between both parties. The Trio Vegabajeño was also featured along Pepito Torres and his Orchestra at the Escambrón Beach Club.

In September 1947, the group debuted the singles "El amor del jibarito" and "Lucerito de plata". During the fall, they performed along Diplo and others at La Sierra Country Club. They also returned to the Cobian's chain to host more farewell shows. In December, Governor Jesús T. Piñero contracted the Trio Vegabajeño to entertain sick children at the Preventorio Antituberculoso at Aibonito. During this month they also release "Rastros", "Un gran amor" and "Más que amor".

To close the year, they traveled to New York for a tour. There they sold out several shows at the Triboro and proved particularly popular among the diaspora. The group then returned to Puerto Rico and performed at smaller local events. In March 1948, they joined Johnny Segui y sus Dandies and Don Felo at La Sierra Country Club. They also released "Yo quiero" and "Llanto de mar". They also participated in civic activities, such as inaugurations and dances. They also performed at the anniversary show for the Puerto Rico Firefighters Corps and a Spanish ball dance at the Condado Beach Hotel. In May 1948, the Trio Vegabajeño debuted the show Carnaval Musical which aired Tuesdays on WKAQ. Meanwhile, Concierto De Luxe was now transmitted Monday, Wednesday and Friday through WIAC, WPAB and WORA. When Johnny Rodríguez and his trio were leaving for a tour, they joined Diplo in a homage at the Cobian's chain.

In July 1948, the Trio Vegabajeño performed "En Mi Viejo San Juan" at La Fortaleza, in an event hosted by Jesús T. Piñero. The group joined Mario Dumont and Johhny Segui y sus Dandies at Sandy Hill in Luquillo. The group also performed assorted appearances, such as providing entertainment for the Puerto Rico National Guard. They joined Ruth Fernández and Guillermo Venegas at the Cruzadas Universitarias to raise funds for the UPR. The group travelled to New York to reinaugurate the Triboro. In September they released the boleros "Besos de Hiel" and "Te Arrepentirás". "Besos de hiel" made it to the Puerto Rico Top-10 in October, while "Corazón rendido" became a Top-5 hit. After signing an exclusivity contract with Colgate-Palmolive, the Trio Vegabajeño debuted Halo Canta which aired Monday through Friday on WAPA. Meanwhile, they continued being a frequent act at the Jack's nightclub, hosting among other events their Halloween Ball. The group participated in an event held by WKAQ following the 1948 elections. The group also joined Ruth Fernández, Paquito Cordero and other artists at an event held at Casa de las Almas in Santurce.

The Trio Vegabajeño opened 1949 by participating in an event organized by the Puerto Rico Department of Agriculture. They then joined Sylvia Rexach and Marquita Rivera in a show at La Fortaleza. In February, the group participated in a large concert held at the UPR named La Marcha de los Vellones. The following month they participated at a farewell show for Myrta Silva held at the Escambrón Beach Club. The Trio Vegabajeño also performed in a cocktail party held for Alabama Secretary of Agriculture and Commerce J.H. Patterson by the local government. In April 1949, the Trio Vegabajeño returned to the Cobian's chain in a farewell event for Johhny Goicuria. The group also helped the Liga Puertorriqueña Contra el Cáncer raise funds. The Trio Vegabajeño joined several artists at the Festival de la Música Popular. The group hosted the inauguration of the Teatro Sol. During the summer of 1949, the Trio Vegabajeño joined Tito Guizar at Teatro Riviera. During the summer, the Trio Vegabajeño joined Juan Boria at the Teatro Gloria and Teatro La Perla.

El Trio Vegabajeño debuted Serenata Oldsmobile and Cuentos Famosos in the summer of 1949, both airing on WAPA. In October, the sponsor changed once again, becoming the Serenata Una Cita Romántica. They also made occasional appearances at the Gran Show Libby's, which aired trough WEMB, and hosted its first anniversary. In that same station, they hosted El Marqués De Luxe, sponsored by Corona. For the station, the Trio Vegabajeño also performed during a farewell show for Tony Chiroldy. When WEMB ceased functions in October 1949, they participated in its last transmission. The Trio Vegabajeño performed at the homecoming event for Luis Rodríguez Olmo at Caguas following his performance at the 1949 World Series. The group returned to Teatro Riviera in a show for Yadira Jiménez. During the fall, they released "No te mires en el río" and "Sorprendida" with Pepo Talavera and Miguelito Miranda. They returned to New York to close the year, participating in a musical competition with Trio América at the Teatro Triboro.

=== Last years of the Golden Era ===
After returning to Puerto Rico, they joined Diplo in an event organized by the Círculo Cubano which hosted the teams competing at the Caribbean Series. In February 1950, they recorded the habanera "Tú". When Port-au-Prince celebrated its bicentennial, the Trio Vegabajeño was invited for an expo organized by the Haitian government. In March 1950, the group played at an event where actor Juano Hernández received the Key to the City of San Juan. The following month, they performed at the Caribe Hilton along Pete Rivera y sus Borinqueños. The group hosted Programa Alba, which debuted at WKJB before also expanding to WKAQ with El Brindis Blatz in May 1950. They sang for the patients at Hospital Rodríguez in Fort Brooke. During the summer, the Trio Vegabajeño released the song "Arquelio", an homage to basketball player Arquelio Torres Ramírez. The July edition of Look magazine featured the Trio Vegabajeño, covering their performances at the Caribe Hilton. They also joined Vitín Miranda at an artistic carnival held at the Teatro Taboas at Manatí.

In September 1950, they released "Purupita" and "Consejo". The group also made odd appearances in the inaugurations of a refrigeration center, a gas station and a cafe, the farewell event for admiral Daniel E. Barbey and a dinner hosting Charles W. Sawyer at La Fortaleza. In a ceremony where a silver sword was awarded to colonel Cordero Dávila of the 65th Infantry Regiment, they were tasked with the music. The group also hosted an activity for hospitalized veterans.

To close the year, they released "Jayuya" and "Borinquen, mi madre y yo" and the following month "Amor que nace" and "Porque adorarte así". Entering 1951, the Trio Vegabajeño won a musical debate over Los Panchos. They collaborated with Bobby Capó in his single "Nuestro Regimiento", dediacted to the 65th Infantry Regiment. During the spring, they performed in the opening ceremonies of several stores including Albors, Almacenes González and Cortada Electric Corporation. The group became a recurrent part of the show Estrella Denia, while another season of El Pelotero de la Semana followed. They joined Bobby Capó and other at the Teatro Puerto Rico in an homage to Pepín Trujillo.

When the 65th Regiment returned to Puerto Rico from Korea, the Trio Vegabajeño played the music of the disembarking. They were contracted by the government to host the tourists arriving from a new air route between San Juan and Chicago. When Antonio Rodríguez Géigel was elected to lead the Club de Leones, the group was placed in charge of the entertainment. The San Germán basketball team brought the group to the celebration of 20 years of Pancho Gelpí's career.

During this timeframe, their productions became well known at South America, from which they received fan support and demands for shows. They also hosted social events for assorted groups, including sororities, the Buchanan Service Club and the municipality of San Juan, among others. The Trio Vegabajeño was one of dozens of artists from multiple fields that formed the Teatro Tapia's Caravana de Artistas show offered in October 1951. The Mayor of San Juan, Felisa Rincón de Gautier contracted them to host recurrent receptions for the soldiers returning from Korea and in another activity for the members of the Constituent Assembly.

When an employee strike was declared at WKAQ, the Trio Vegabajeño respected it and the station transmitted pre-recorded performances. Meanwhile, they continued at WAPA with "Quien Soy Yo" and "Armonías Camay". The Trio Vegabajeño was featured as part of Revista Artística 1951 by Robert Moret. They hosted the Club Cívico de Damas de Puerto Rico's Christmas activity at the Caribe Hilton. The Trio Vegabajeño participated at a music recital held at the Escuela Libre de Música. They closed the year by hosting the Lebanese community of San Juan at the Escambrón Beach Club. In January 1952, the Trio Vegabajeño played for the leader of the National Foreign Trade Council, Robert A. Breer in a lunch organized by the government. They were contracted by the Girl Scouts on their 25th anniversary event. The group also hosted a show titled La isla del progreso at the inauguration of the West India Machinery & Supply Co. industrial plant.

The Trio Vegabajeño performed at the Tropicana Club, including their Holy Saturday ball dance. The group returned to the Fiestas Patronales at Morovis. They joined a parade held by WAPA and Caribe Motors. The Trio Vegabajeño was featured in the Sociedad Puertorriqueña de Autores, Compositores y Editores de Música-sponsored Desfile de Estrellas. In October, they helped raise funds for the Iglesia de Santa Teresita de Jesús a gala named Gran Premiere De Luxe held at the Paramount theater. In November 1952, guitarist Jorge Hernández joined the group. Following the Pan Am Flight 526A accident, the group adapted a song composed by Rafael Hernández in remembrance of those that died in the crash.

When First Bank first opened at Santurce, the group played at the inauguration event. Dole and General Electric would also sponsor their shows at WAPA. The Trio Vegabajeño performed at a festival held at Guayama that attracted over 28,000. When the New York Committee on Puerto Rican Affairs visited the island, the government contracted the Trio Vegabajeño to entertain them. In March their rendition of the song "Quisqueya" was a hit. That same month, Álvarez became ill and was hospitalized, but his hiatus was short and the group was contracted by the Caribe Hilton to perform at their Club Caribe as regulars. They joined Felipe Rodríguez, Ruth Fernández and several others at the Show de Shows held at the Sixto Escobar Stadium. In May, the Trio Vegabajeño released "La nieve de mis años" and "Punto". The group was then contracted to appear at Habana.

They were also recruited by the Senate of Puerto Rico to play during the exhibition of a film about its members being sworn into office. During the summer of 1953, they returned to the Club Social Tres Palmas. They returned to the Cobian's Paramount in a show for Mariano Sulsona. In July 1953, the group released the boleros "Celos" and "Lo que murió en Paris". When Luis Muñoz Marín proclaimed a speech following the adoption of an insular constitution about his beliefs on the status of the island, the Trio Vegabajeño was tasked with performing Puerto Rican music at the event. In August they were contracted by the municipality of San Juan to host another dinner, after which they traveled abroad.

In September, they released "El amor llegó de noche" and "Uno que si, uno que no". The group received a farewell event from El Pomarrosal at San Juan. In October they released "Mi Sevillana" and "Será mejor". The following month, the Trio Vegabajeño issued a Christmas production featuring "Cantares de Navidad" and "Así eres tú". Their show at WAPA became known as Lo Pide el Pueblo. In January 1954, they released "Valor, valor" and "En silencio". In March 1954, participated in the Tómbola de Caridad held to help the Servicio de Damas Voluntarias de la Capital. In April, the group debuted "Para que volver" and "Trigueñita". This was followed within a month by "La copa rota" and "Triste camino". The group returned to the Cobian's Teatro Puerto Rico in a show for Pepe Reyes.

The Trio Vegabajeño participated in a farewell show for Raúl Delgado Cué. The group then joined Diplo and Felipe Rodríguez in another farewell show, this one for Johnny Rodríguez. They then participated at the Festival de Arte y Belleza at the Teatro Tapia. The Catholic Church brought them for the consecration of the Ciales parish house and a convent. They also performed at the Casino Español de Arecibo and the Moca town hall. During the fall, the Trio Vegabajeño released a criollo bolero version of "En mi Viejo San Juan", "Noche de Paz", "Como te adoro yo todo", "El amor del jibarito" and "Estoy metido donde estas corazón". They also released several Christmas-themes "Golondrinas de Navidad" and "Tristeza de Navidad", "Los Tres Reyes Magos". The Trio Vegabajeño also made appearances in the new medium of television in Puerto Rico, particularly on WAPA-TV's Show Kresto-Denia. For that channel, they also helped the Sociedad Pro-Bienestar de Niños con Parálisis Cerebral. They continued producing songs, including the waltz "Cosas de ayer" and the bolero "Sufre". To open 1955, the Trio Vegabajeño traveled to New York.

During the summer of 1955, they were contracted by Fernando Cortés to host the television program Show de Shows. The group also returned to radio in WKAQ's Club Corona. They also participated in other events for the brand, including the presentation of the "Súper-sorpresas Corona" contest. On November 20, 1955, the group joined dozens of artists for a tele-marathon in support of children with cerebral palsy organized by WAPA.

During the fall, they performed at the Gran Fiesta Corona concert sponsored by the beer brand and held at Ponce. The group also presented the boleros "Noche de recuerdo" and "Mi amor eterno", the waltz "Castígame Señor" and the guaracha "Idolatría". They continued at New York with appearances at the Teatro Puerto Rico. The Trio Vegabajeño once again released a Christmas production, this one featuring multiple aguinaldos, traditional and danza songs including the "Alegre amanecer", "Brisas de Navidad", "Cantares de Navidad", "Así eres tú", "Tristeza de Navidad" and "Golondrinas de Navidad".

=== Civic events and radio ===
The critic music publication ¡Codazos! elected them the "Trio of the Week" on January 11, 1956. The Trio Vegabajeño continued their civic shows by performing at the Sanatorio on Monther's Day. They joined the Mayor of San Juan Rincón in a trip to New York, Philadelphia and Chicago. After Diplo died in 1956, the Trio Vegabajeño released a posthumous homage named "Llorando a Diplo" and "Allá en el cielo". The group reappeared at the Fiestas Patronales at Cabo Rojo and Aguada. The New Broadway theatre also hosted an event organized where the Trio Vegabajeño was joined by Los Panchos.

In January 1957, they released the bolero "Dile que vuelva" and the ranchera "Pa’ eso soy hombre". During the summer, they performed at the Fiestas Patronales at Aguas Buenas along Tito Lara and Los Hispanos, among others. In February 1957, they were contracted in a ceremony organized by the Club de Leones where the flag of Puerto Rico used by the 65th Infantry Regiment was presented. In April 1957, the Capitol of Puerto Rico recognized Ernesto Ramos Antonini in an event where the Trio Vegabajeño provided the musical act. Their songs were compiled for a local film, Trio Vegabajeño. The group was one of several acts that were featured at the Gran Baile de La Prensa, held at the Escambrón Beach Club. They then headlined the Fiestas Patronales at Río Grande, where an homage to the people of the municipality that had left and gone on to distinguish themselves. They repeated this for the absent citizens of San Sebastián.

During the fall, they released "Que lo disponga Dios" and "Pa’ ti solita". The Trio Vegabajeño returned to the Teatro Puerto Rico at New York and traveled to Miami. In November they once again helped the Sociedad Pro-Bienestar de Niños con Parálisis Cerebral in an event held at the Teatro Metropolitan. The Trio Vegabajeño joined Trio Borincano, Los Hispanos and others in the 35th anniversary of WKAQ.

They returned to the Fiestas Patronales circuit with appearances at Lajas. The Trio Vegabajeño animated an event where actress Irish McCalla, known for the titular role in Sheena, Queen of the Jungle, appeared to raise funds for the Red Cross. In May they were featured at the Puerto Rico Police's celebration of the Week of the Police. During the summer, they joined Trio Los Hispanos at the Feria del Hogar. In September 1958, legislators and other public functionaries gave a recognition to the Sociedad Española de Auxilio Mutuo y Beneficiencia de Puerto Rico, in which the Trio Vegabajeño provided the entertainment. During the fall, the group participated in the Fiestas Patronales at Vega Baja, once again partnering with Corona.

During the winter of 1958–59, "Cantares de Navidad" was one of the Top-10 songs in Puerto Rico. The group was contracted to provide music for the Christmas party of the Sanatorio A. Ruiz Soler. In February 1959, Club Corona was extended to also include a Saturday afternoon slot. They returned to the Fiestas Patronales circuit at San Juan during the summer of 1959. They also performed at Teatro La Perla. They continued appearing at Fiestas Patronales at Río Piedras.

By November 1959, the show had an average rating of 22.1 and 6.0 for rebroadcasts, placing it first on its time slot. In December, they appeared at the Fiestas Patronales at Ponce, where they hosted an edition of Club Corona. The film “Trio Vegabajeño” also appeared in WIPR-TV's Christmas programming. The group also continued working with government agencies, hosting their events.

In February 1960, the Trio Vegabajeño participated in the event Domingo de los Corazones in support of the Asociacion Puertorriqueña Para Combatir Las Enfermedades Del Corazón. In April 1960, the Trio Vegabajeño joined Tebito Romero is a show for Supermercado Co-Op. In September 1960, they participated in a tele-marathon organized by WKAQ-TV to raise funds for families affected by a series of floods.

In March 1961, the group returned to the Domingo de los Corazones event. During the summer of 1961, the Trio Vegabajeño appeared at the Fiestas Patronales at Cataño. When young singer Puruco Rivera decided to travel abroad to make his foreign debut, the Trio Vegabajeño was among his accompanying acts. In September 1961, the group was contracted to appear in a film where María Antonietta Pons was filming in Puerto Rico. During the fall, they hosted the Gran Show Corona, which became a recurrent event at the Plaza de Recreo. When Roberto Clemente and Orlando Cepeda returned to Puerto Rico after excelling during the 1961 MLB season, the Trio Vegabajeño was among the artists that performed at the formal event organized by the government. The group also hosted the festivities of a homage held for Mayor Rincón. In December, the Trio Vegabajeño resumed its tour of the Fiestas Patronales circuit representing Corona. Their song "Romance del campesino" was featured in the film Romance en Puerto Rico, the first filmed locally in film color. The group joined Tommy Olivencia in providing the music when WKAQ celebrated its 40th anniversary. In December 1962, the Trio Vegabajeño was invited by Julito Rodríguez to participate in Las Mañanitas, a religious event in the Parroquia de la Guadalupe at Puerto Nuevo.

The Trio Vegabajeño was also contracted by Fernando Cortés to welcome Luis Aguilar for his participation in the filming of El flamboyán azul. They then joined WKAQ-TV in a tele-marathon to gather funds for the Asociación Puertorriqueña del Corazón. The Trio Vegabajeño also made an appearance in Cortés' color film Lamento Borincano, released in November 1963. During the following years, their activity was reduced, being contrated for smaller activities such as the inauguration of Island Publicity Agency's offices. In September 1964, they harmonized an event sponsored by the Sociedad de Esposas de Médicos at La Concha.

=== Lineup changes and the retro act ===
After returning from a tour of the United States and following the cancellation of their long running radio show, the group experienced internal differences. In 1965, the group's most successful lineup disbanded by mutual accord. However, this pause was brief since the organization reformed with Álvarez, Rubén Maldonado and Guillermo Rivera, a lineup that recorded two albums before Ricardo Ferilú and Chevín Pérez came in as replacements. Meanwhile, Benito de Jesús debuted his own spinoff named the "Nuevo Trio Vegabajeño" integrating two of his sons and singer Carlos Vélez, which experienced some success at New York and appeared in the Teatro Puerto Rico. When the frigate El Potosí of the Mexican Navy docked at San Juan in 1966, the municipality contracted the group to entertain the crew. In April 1967, the original group was contracted by the San Jerónimo Hilton hotel to host an event for the Day of the Secretary.

They began performing at Miramar Center and were contracted to appear in the film El jibarito Rafael based on music composed by Rafael Hernández. They followed this by performing in another local movie, Me casé con un Cura. After losing their first guitar to Los Monarcas, they contracted the first guitar from Gran Casino. When the Racquet Club Hotel contracted the Leonard Hicks International Hotel Management Company they named Burt Poppelier as their General Manager, who contracted the Trio Vegabajeño to appear at the Salón Tudor of the Kasablanca hotel. In 1972, the San Jerónimo hotel contracted the Trio Vegabajeño to sing a selection of romantic and Latin music as part of a seasonal stay at the Castilian Dining Room. The recurring show that lasted several years. They also continued active in the night club scene and recorded more albums.

Despite not being as active in television or radio as before, they still made the occasional cameo in programs like El Show Goya. The Trio Vegabajeño returned abroad to record an LP at New York and make appearances at Indiana, Philadelphia, Boston and Cleveland. After the government took over the administration of several hotel, the Secretary of Industrial Development Manuel Casiano favored local artists, which included featuring the group. By the 1970s, their music was considered retro. In 1973, the Trio Vegabajeño released the LP Época de Oro.

In August 1973, the Trio Vegabajeño appeared in an episode of WAPA-TV's Luis Vigoreaux Presenta which paid homage to Noel Estrada, along Tito Lara, Ednita Nazario, Los Imperiales and José Raúl Ramírez. The following month they released "Sigamos Pecando" as part of the Trio Vegabajeño, Vol. 2 production. In December, they made a return to Luis Vigoreaux Presenta, performing along the Coro de Niños de San Juan, The Sedojas, Carol Myles and Eartha Kitt. The Trio Vegabajeño also participated in the inauguration of the Romano Hostaria dell’ Orso restaurant at the Hotel Helio Isla.

In August 1974, the Trio Vegabajeño joined dozens of artists in Jerry Lewis' tele-marathon in benefit of research on muscular dystrophy, which aired trough WAPA-TV. The following month, WKBM-TV's El Súper Show Goya held an edition to homage the group, among other artists. In August 1975, the Trio Vegabajeño once again participated in the Jerry Lewis' tele-marathon, which was recorded at the Wyatt Hotel. In early 1976, the Trio Vegabajeño became a nighttime mainstay at the La Fiesta Lounge of the Condado Holiday Inn. In June, they were invited to serve as the main act of the Father's Day edition of WKAQ-TV's El Show de Walter Mercado. In August 1976, El Súper Show Goya had an episode dedicated to the Golden Age of Trio music, which featured them along Trío Los Grandes and Trío Borinquen. They joined Los Antares again for a program for Telemundo titled Los compositores y sus canciones in which Francisco Hernández Vargas was recognized. In November 1977, the Trio Vegabajeño participated in a homage concert for Noel Estrada organized by the Asociación Puertorriqueña de Compositores y Autores (APCA) at the Roberto Clemente Coliseum.

In July 1978, the Trio Vegabajeño returned to El Súper Show Goya which held another special episode on trios, once again joining Los Tres Grandes and Trio Borinquen. In March 1979, Álvarez reorganized the Trio Vegabajeño by integrating Tatín Vale to form the “Los Embajadores” era of the group along Rafael Scharrón. They revisited some of the group's old repertoire in a new LP. Afterwards, the trio appeared in the El Súper Show Goya along singer Betty Missiego. Álvarez insisted on keeping the trio active, despite being the only member of the original group still alive, and argued that he was not ready to retire since he felt well and fit to sing. During the summer of 1980, the Trio Vegabajeño was part of the XIX Feria Nacional de Artesanía de Barranquitas, offering a concert during one of its dates. The Asociación Puertorriqueña de Amantes de la Música del Ayer (APAMS), which was dedicated to preserve and promote retro music, organized the Gran Festival de Música del Ayer with the participation of the group along several contemporary acts. The Trio Vegabajeño continued this nostalgic trend by participating in an event held at Velasco at Carolina remembering the 1930s-40s. The group was also featured in Danny Rivera's television special Algún Día which was aired by WAPA-TV on Mother's Day in 1981. They continued active hosting social events, most for those that had been young during their peak. Álvarez also secured a promotional deal with the car brand Mazda, promoting them in the Puerto Rican media.

=== Later years ===
Entering the 1980s, "No sigamos pecando", "Vuelve", "La copa rota" and "De rodillas" were still popular songs, but "Cantares de Navidad" remained their most consistent success. When the Bienal de San Juan de Música del Siglo 20 was organized with several dates, the Trio Vegabajeño was included in an anthology of Puerto Rican popular music that took place at Teatro Tapia. On November 12, 1982, the group performed at Café Teatro El Búho in Humacao. In 1983, they collaborated with the Tierralinda Travel Club, playing when their excursions arrived at the Pichi's Convention Center. The Trio Vegabajeño was featured in WIPR-TV's genre program Tríos en el Seis. In April 1983, a group of media personalities and cultural leaders led by José Enrique Ayoroa Santaliz publicly lobbied for the Golden Age line up of the group to reunite and offer some concerts together, Álvarez supported the idea but Maduro was reportedly unable to participate.

In March 1984, the Jagueyes Country Club held an homage event for the group, emphasizing its Golden Age lineup. Author Pedro Malavet Vega included the Trio Vegabajeño as a reference in his musically oriented 1984 history book La vellonera está directa. In January 1985, the Trio Vegabajeño made an appearance in WAPA-TV's Gran Aplauso, a variety show hosted by Héctor Marcano. During the spring, the Club Caborrojeño and the Banco de Ponce contracted the group to play during a retro activity, where they recreated Cabo Rojo as it was during the 1940s. The group also collaborated with Island Tourists, a touring company, providing the entertainment. The Trio Vegabajeño continued their retro tour by participating in the Concierto de tríos, which aired trough WKAQ-TV and was used to raise funds for the Ciudad Deportiva Roberto Clemente. During this time, they were also a recurrent act featured at WSTE's Mediodía en el 7. The group also appeared in that channel's Peña en DownBeat.

In December 1985, the municipality of Hatillo joined the Institute of Puerto Rican Culture (ICP) and the Centro Cultural José P.H. Hernández to sponsor a musical event at the Festival de las Máscaras which featured several acts, including the Trio Vegabajeño. In early 1986, the group made a return to the programming of WAPA-TV, with frequent appearances in shows such as Sábado en grande and Mediodía. When WSTE introduced El Show de Chucho with Chucho Avellanet, they were among the artists featured. When local wholesaler Pérez Hermanos celebrated its 20th anniversary, the Trio Vegabajeño was contracted to provide the music in the event held at Cayey. During the summer of 1986, they participated in a homage concert for fellow trios singer Miguelito Alcaide held at Restaurant El Rancho in Arecibo.

In May 1987, the group played at the Tercer Encuentro Nacional de Coleccionistas de Música Popular, an event that gathered people that studied and collected popular music. Plaza Las Américas contracted the Trio Vegabajeño to perform a Mother's Day concert at La Terraza food court. When the University of Puerto Rico celebrated its 85th anniversary, the Trio Vegabajeño played during the closing acts. On September 10, 1988, the Trio Vegabajeño played at La Fortaleza along other trios in an event hosted by Ruth Fernández. In January 1989, the Sociedad Pro-Conservación de la Serenata included the group in its initiative to reactivate the traditional Puerto Rican serenades. When long-running WKAQ-TV show Los Kakucómicos ended, the Trio Vegabajeño was invited to perform in its final episode. The Asociación de Comerciantes de Puerto Nuevo contracted them to participate in a homage to Tito Henríquez.

When the compact disc became a widespread medium for music, the Trio Vegabajeño re-released some of its classics in this format, as they had done when the cassette was introduced. During the summer of 1990, the group played at the Festival del Trabajador de la Piña at Vega Alta. They also participated in the cocktail of the retro event “La gran fiesta” held at Hotel San Juan. In September 1990, the Trio Vegabajeño collaborated with the Puerto Rico Telephone Company as part of a series of homages for Julito Rodríguez Reyes. The following month, the Trio Vegabajeño participated in the Gran Cumbre de Trios at the Centro de Bellas Artes, where they joined several other groups. In December 1990, they joined Julito Rodríguez, Lily y su Gran Trío, Los Condes and Trío Voces de Puerto Rico in the “Música de Siempre” Christmas concert held at the Antonio Paoli Festival Room at Centro de Bellas Artes.

== Legacy ==
The Trio Vegabajeño was the first trio to be organized locally to experience widespread success, earning it the nickname El Trío Nacional de Puerto Rico (lit. "The Puerto Rico National Trio"). By the late 20th Century the trio was considered one of the best group acts in the history of Puerto Rico and regarded as "legendary". In 1983, artist Carlos Irizarry announced that the Trio Vegabajeño was among the topics that he wanted to include in a project that incorporated music, painting and cinema and covered artists that played a role in defining what being Puerto Rican is all about. When Carlos Vigoreaux announced that he wanted to publish an encyclopedia of Puerto Rican music, he argued that the Trio Vegabajeño was an important part of the local culture that for reasons unknown had not been sponsored by the ICP to record additional productions. In November 1986, Danny Rivera released “Ofrenda” which featured a mix of the group's songs. The following month, Felito Félix and Voces de Puerto Rico released the homage Boleros y Baladas Románticas. When interviewed José Nogueras expressed that he grew up listening to the Trio Vegabajeño in radio and watching Show del mediodía, which eventually led to his recording of the retro production Canciones de vellonera. In 1989, the municipality of Vega Baja commissioned the building of a monument for the group.

Besides playing the guitar, Benito de Jesús also composed songs including Nuestro Juramento. Multiple versions of this song were recorded by foreign artists, including one in English. The Trio Vegabajeño gifted a guitar to Isabelino Marzán Carreras, a politician for the Puerto Rican Socialist Party (PSP) and Puerto Rican Independence Party (PIP), which he played frequently until his death. In 2002, the group was inducted into the International Latin Music Hall of Fame. Vega Baja native Bad Bunny paid homage to the Trio Vegabajeño in his 2020 album El Último Tour Del Mundo, which included a rendition of "Cantares de Navidad". The municipality also named an avenue in their honor. During the Golden Age of the group, Guillermo Venegas Lloveras composed their theme song Tema - Trío Vegabajeño in which aside from describing the town of Vega Baja they also state what town is each one from: [Fernandito] "Yo soy de Vega Baja (I am from Vega Baja)
[Benito] Barceloneta es mi pueblo (Barceloneta is my town)
[Pepito] Humacao fue mi cuna (Humacao was my cradle)..."

== Line-ups ==
Note: this list of line-ups is incomplete.

1943-45:

- Fernandito Alvarez
- Benito de Jesús
- Octavio González

1945-52:

- Fernandito Alvarez
- Benito de Jesús
- Pepito Maduro

1952-65:

- Fernandito Alvarez
- Benito de Jesús
- Pepito Maduro
- Jorge Hernandez

1965-80:

- Fernandito Alvarez
- Ruben Maldonado
- Guillermo Rivera

1980:

- Fernandito Alvarez
- Ruben Maldonado
- Nacho Carrasquillo

1986 reunion (same as 1952-65):

- Fernandito Alvarez
- Benito de Jesús
- Pepito Maduro
- Jorge Hernandez

== Discography ==
The original line-up (Alvarez, De Jesús and Maduro) only got to record 78 RPM records. The following discography only covers the records in LP format with the Marvela label which started once the fourth member, Jorge Hernandez, joined in 1952.

- Canta El Trio Vegabajeño (c. 1952)
- Canta El Trio Vegabajeño Vol. 2 (c. 1954)
- Canta El Trio Vegabajeño Vol. 3 (c. 1955)
- Canta El Trio Vegabajeño Vol. 4 (c. 1957)

Their song "Cantares de Navidad" was featured as the last song of Bad Bunny's album El Último Tour Del Mundo.
