= The Road of Life =

The Road of Life may refer to:

- The Road of Life (film) (El camino de la vida), a 1956 Mexican drama film
- The Road of Life (TV series), an American daytime soap opera
- Road of Life, a set of ice road transport routes across Lake Ladoga to Leningrad during the Second World War
- El Camino de la Vida (song) (translation "the road of life"), a Colombian song
