= Danny Rivera / Alborada =

Studio album by Danny Rivera and Alborada
- Released: 1976
- Recorded: Televicentro Sound, Puerto Rico
- Genre: Nueva trova
- Length: 39:42
- Label: Graffiti, Coco Records
- Producer: Harvey Averne

Alternative cover
- CD version (1999)

Danny Rivera / Alborada is an album by Danny Rivera and the group Alborada (from Puerto Rico) which has been categorized by critics as one of the best albums by Danny Rivera. This album was dedicated to Puerto Rican composer Manuel Jiménez "El Canario" who died in 1975.

== Album name ==
At first it seems like Alborada is the name of an album by Danny Rivera, but in reality it is a self-titled album.

The original agreement between Danny and Alborada was to have the album titled Danny Rivera y Alborada (Danny Rivera and Alborada) but at the last minute the record company decided to get rid of the "y" ("and"). The CD version has the name "Alborada" in a smaller font than "Danny Rivera" contributing even more to this misconception.

== Track listing ==
Side A
No.	Title	Composer	Length
1.	"Alegoría"	Eladio Torres	5:19
2.	"Tu Vives en Mi Pensamiento"	Eladio Torres	3:19
3.	"Guaracha del Ruiseñor"	Américo Boschetti	2:53
4.	"Piensa"	Heriberto Gonzalez	3:57
5.	"El Día del Hombre"	Eladio Torres	2:56

Side B
No.	Title	Composer	Length
1.	"Jesus, Maria y Jose"	Roberto Figueroa	3:51
2.	"La Resurreccion del Día"	Eladio Torres	4:18
3.	"Tanta Vanidad"	Manuel Jiménez "El Canario"	4:03
4.	"Villancico Yaucano"	Amaury Veray	3:05
5.	"Huracán"	Heriberto Gonzalez	4:47

== Musicians ==
- Danny Rivera - lead vocals
- Eladio Torres - guitar and lead vocals on "Huracán"
- Carlos Bedoya - cuatro
- Heriberto González Sánchez - guitar and lead vocals on "Huracán"
- Minerva Aponte - lead vocals
- Roberto Figueroa - guitar and lead vocals on "Huracán"
- Frank Lovato - guitar (uncredited on album)
- Tony Fornaris - congas, bongó and percussion
- Wiso Velez - bass
- Deano Navarro - drums
- Pablo Nieves - percussion
- Amaury Veray - classical pianist

== Production details ==
=== Album art ===
The album art was created by guitarist, singer and composer of Alborada, Heriberto González.

=== Error ===
In Huracán (at 1:24), Danny gets confused when introducing the next singer Heriberto González saying "Rob... Heriberto digo..." ("Rob... I mean, Heriberto"). For some reason this was not corrected.
