= Carlos Rubira Infante =

Ecuadorian singer-songwriter (1921–2018)

Carlos Rubira
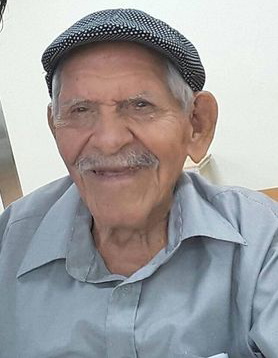

Background information
- Born: Carlos Aurelio Rubira Infante; September 16, 1923
- Died: September 14, 2018 (aged 94)
- Occupation: Singer
- Instrument: Voice

Carlos Aurelio Rubira Infante (16 September 1921 – 14 September 2018) was an Ecuadorian singer and songwriter of pasillo and pasacalle music.

He began performing his songs on the radio station El Telégrafo for a program called "La hora agrícola". He then formed the group "Vera Santos-Rubira".

== Career ==
He also formed the group "Los Porteños" with the singer Olimpo Cardenas. Until then Cardenas had been a tango singer but asked Rubira to teach him to sing pasillo music. He also influenced the singers Fresia Saavedra, Pepe and Julio Jaramillo, among others. As teenagers, he and Julio Jaramillo once worked together at a shoe store, and after work he would invite Jaramillo over to teach him some songs. His friends Olimpo Cardenas and Julio Jaramillo went on to international fame singing the type of music Rubira taught them.

== Awards ==
Rubira was awarded the National Prize in Art "Premio Eugenio Espejo" in 2008 from the President of Ecuador. Two months before his death, he was announced as one of the recipients to be inducted into the Latin Songwriters Hall of Fame.

== Discography ==
Carlos Rubira Infante wrote over 400 songs. Among them are:

- Guayaquileño madera de guerrero
- Guayaquil pórtico de oro
- Ambato tierra de flores
- Esposa
- En las lejanías
- Lindo Milagro
- Lo mejor de mi tierra
- El Cóndor Mensajero (himno del migrate Alauseño a lo largo y ancho del mundo)
- Playita mía
- Mi primer amor
- Quiero verte madre
- Quedas tranquila
- Para entonces
- Historia de amor
- Al oído
- Cálmate corazón
- Desde que te fuiste
- En las lejanías\
- Por qué (pasillos)
- El cartero
- Chica linda
- Venga conozca El Oro (pasacalle)
- El bautizo (albazo)
- Pedazo de bandido (aire típico)
