= Controversia (album) =

1985 studio album by Danny Rivera and other musicians

Studio album by Danny Rivera, Vicente Carattini y Los Cantores de San Juan, and Alpha IV
- Released: 1985
- Recorded: Melody Recording Studio, Puerto Rico
- Genre: Puerto Rican Folk Music
- Length: 35:15
- Label: Alpha Records
- Producer: Javier Hernandez

Danny Rivera, Vicente Carattini y Los Cantores de San Juan, and Alpha IV chronology
Así Cantaba Cheito González (1984)	Controversia (1985)	Ofrenda (1986)

Controversia is an album by Danny Rivera, Vicente Carattini y Los Cantores de San Juan and Alpha IV. This album was Danny Rivera's first Puerto-Rican-Christmas-Music album. The title song "Controversia" (Controversy) is about an argument between Danny and Vicente in which Vicente accuses Danny of stealing Christmas gigs from him by becoming a new Christmas-music singer. At the end of the song, vocalist Alma Galarza comes in to break up the "fight" and at the end they both make peace. In real life, however, Danny did steal something from Vicente. For his next album Ofrenda he wanted vocalist Alma Galaza (who had been singing with Vicente for 8 years) to be a special guest vocalist, but only if she quit Vicente and his group. Alma went with Danny with whom she recorded several albums and toured for several years.

This album was dedicated to Puerto Rican composer Mario Enrique, who composed 3 song for the album.

Despite the success of this album, it is no longer available on CD. The rights for this and other albums by Danny were bought by Disco Hit which in 2004 released a best of compilation called "20 Exitos Navideños" ("20 Christmas Hits") which included 6 songs from Controversia and other songs from Ofrenda, Mi Canción es Paz and Pido Paz.

== Album cover and name ==
The cover was inspired by Halley's Comet. The comet has nothing to do with the title of the album or any of its songs. It is not clear if the photo is that of Halley's Comet or simply a made-up photo.

== Track listing ==
Side A
No.	Title	Lead singer	Length
1.	"Controversia" (Felix Morales)	Danny Rivera, Vicente Carattini and Alma Galarza	3:57
2.	"El Cardenalito" (Adelis Freitez)	Danny Rivera and Vicente Carattini	2:54
3.	"Mañanita Campera" (Rafael Hernández)	Danny Rivera	3:45
4.	"Trulla Pa' Tí" (Herminio de Jesús)	Vicente Carattini	3:14
5.	"Plena De Ofrecimiento" (Mario Enrique)	Danny Rivera and Vicente Carattini	2:34

Side B
No.	Title	Lead singer	Length
1.	"De Mi Voz Nació La Luz" (Mario Enrique)	Danny Rivera and Alma Galarza	4:33
2.	"El Coquí" (Herminio de Jesús)	Danny Rivera and Vicente Carattini	3:14
3.	"Con Todas Las Flores Vengo" (Mario Enrique)	Danny Rivera	4:11
4.	"Alegre Amanecer" (Pepito Maduro. Originally recorded by Trio Vegabajeño)	Danny Rivera	3:15
5.	"Plena de los Cantores" (Herminio de Jesús)	Alma Galarza	3:10

== Musicians ==
- Danny Rivera – lead vocals
- Vicente Carattini – lead vocals
- Alma Galarza (Vicente Carattini y Los Cantores de San Juan) – lead vocals and female dialog on "Trulla Pa' Tí"
  (credited on the album simply as backing vocals)
- José Gonzalez – Puerto Rican cuatro, guitar
- Jorge Hernandez – requinto, Puerto Rican cuatro
- Jorge Cancel – guitar
- Chebin Perez – guitar
- Javier Hernandez – bass, sinfonía, percusión
- Pablo Figueroa – guiro
- Lillian Colón – Venezuelan cuatro
- Hector Rodriguez – plenera
- Janet Hernandez (Vicente Carattini y Los Cantores de San Juan) – backing vocals
- Marinés Colón – backing vocals

== Production ==
- Musical arrangements: José Gonzalez, Javier Hernandez, Rei Peña, Alpha IV and Los Cantores de San Juan
- Musical director – Javier Hernandez
- Producers – Gladys Hernandez and Vicente Carattini
- Recording engineers – Rei Peña and Javier Hernandez
- Mixing – Javier Hernandez
- Art and cover design – Heriberto Gonzalez
- Distribution – Alpha Records
