= List of number-one Billboard Regional Mexican Songs of 2001 =

The Billboard Regional Mexican Songs chart ranks the best-performing Regional Mexican singles in the United States. Published weekly by Billboard magazine, it ranks the "most popular regional Mexican songs, ranked by radio airplay audience impressions as measured by Nielsen Music."

== Chart history ==
Key
†	Indicates number 1 on Billboard's year-end regional Mexican chart

Issue date	Song	Artist(s)	Ref.
January 6	"Y sigues siendo tú"	Rogelio Martínez "El RM"	
January 13	"Borracho te recuerdo"	Vicente Fernández	
January 20	"Enséñame a olvidarte"	Intocable	
January 27	"Enséñame a olvidarte"	Intocable	
February 3	"Dime, dime, dime"	Conjunto Primavera	
February 10	"Dime, dime, dime"	Conjunto Primavera	
February 17	"Enséñame a olvidarte"	Intocable	
February 24	"Enséñame a olvidarte"	Intocable	
March 3	"El amor soñado"	Los Tucanes de Tijuana	
March 10	"El amor soñado"	Los Tucanes de Tijuana	
March 17	"El amor soñado"	Los Tucanes de Tijuana	
March 24	"El amor soñado"	Los Tucanes de Tijuana	
March 31	"Y llegaste tú" †	Banda el Recodo de Cruz Lizárraga	
April 7	"El amor soñado"	Los Tucanes de Tijuana	
April 14	"El amor soñado"	Los Tucanes de Tijuana	
April 21	"Y llegaste tú" †	Banda el Recodo de Cruz Lizárraga	
April 28	"No te podías quedar"	Conjunto Primavera	
May 5	"Y llegaste tú" †	Banda el Recodo de Cruz Lizárraga	
May 12	"No te podías quedar"	Conjunto Primavera	
May 19	"No te podías quedar"	Conjunto Primavera	
May 26	"No te podías quedar"	Conjunto Primavera	
June 2	"Y llegaste tú" †	Banda el Recodo de Cruz Lizárraga	
June 9	"No te podías quedar"	Conjunto Primavera	
June 16	"Y llegaste tú" †	Banda el Recodo de Cruz Lizárraga	
June 23	"Y llegaste tú" †	Banda el Recodo de Cruz Lizárraga	
June 30	"Y llegaste tú" †	Banda el Recodo de Cruz Lizárraga	
July 7	"Y llegaste tú" †	Banda el Recodo de Cruz Lizárraga	
July 14	"No te podías quedar"	Conjunto Primavera	
July 21	"No te podías quedar"	Conjunto Primavera	
July 28	"No me conoces aún"	Palomo	
August 4	"No me conoces aún"	Palomo	
August 11	"No me conoces aún"	Palomo	
August 18	"No me conoces aún"	Palomo	
August 25	"No me conoces aún"	Palomo	
September 1	"No me conoces aún"	Palomo	
September 8	"No me conoces aún"	Palomo	
September 15	"No me conoces aún"	Palomo	
September 22	"No me conoces aún"	Palomo	
September 29	"No me conoces aún"	Palomo	
October 6	"No me conoces aún"	Palomo	
October 13	"No me conoces aún"	Palomo	
October 20	"No me conoces aún"	Palomo	
October 27	"No me conoces aún"	Palomo	
November 3	"No me conoces aún"	Palomo	
November 10	"No me conoces aún"	Palomo	
November 17	"No me conoces aún"	Palomo	
November 24	"No me conoces aún"	Palomo	
December 1	"No me conoces aún"	Palomo	
December 8	"No me conoces aún"	Palomo	
December 15	"No me conoces aún"	Palomo	
December 22	"No me conoces aún"	Palomo	
December 29	"No me conoces aún"	Palomo	
