= La Chona (song) =

1997 single by Los Tucanes de Tijuana

- 1997 7-inch single cover

Single by Los Tucanes de Tijuana

from the album Me Robaste el Corazón
- Language: Spanish
- B-side: "El Centenario"
- Released: 19 June 1995; 1997 (single version)
- Genre: Norteño
- Length: 3:16
- Label: EMI Mexico
- Songwriter: Mario Quintero Lara
- Producer: Gustavo Felix

Los Tucanes de Tijuana singles chronology
"El Güero Palma" (1996)	"La Chona" (1995)	"Es Verdad" (1997)

Music video
- "La Chona" on YouTube

"La Chona" is a song by Mexican norteño band Los Tucanes de Tijuana. It was first released on 19 June 1995, as part of the band's album Me Robaste el Corazón (1995), later being released as a single in 1997. Written by lead vocalist Mario Quintero Lara, the song attained virality in 2018 following its usage in Internet memes and "La Chona Challenge".

== Background and writing ==
Mario Quintero Lara, lead vocalist and songwriter for the band, wrote "La Chona" in five minutes after one of his friends, who was an announcer of a radio station in Ensenada, Baja California, requested that he should write it so that he could play it on the station. Written about the friend's wife, he was not sure if he wanted to include the song on the band's album Me Robaste el Corazón, considering it an unimportant song.

== Release and reception ==
"La Chona" was first released on 19 June 1995 as the sixth track from the album Me Robaste el Corazón. In 2018, the song went viral on social platforms through "La Chona Challenge"; similar to the "Kiki Challenge", a person exits a moving vehicle and dances on a road to the song. "La Chona" was featured in the 2023 film Blue Beetle.

== Track listings ==
- US remix CD single
1. "La Chona" – 3:17
2. "La Chona" ("popular" remix version) – 2:49
3. "La Chona" (discothèque remix version; radio edit) – 4:53
4. "La Chona" (discothèque remix version; extended version) – 6:32
- Mexico 7-inch single
1. "La Chona" – 3:16
2. "El Centenario" – 2:36

== Charts ==
1997 weekly chart performance for "La Chona"
Chart (1997)	Peak position
US Hot Latin Songs (Billboard)	28
US Regional Mexican Airplay (Billboard)	17

2015–2019 weekly chart performance for "La Chona"
Chart (2015–2019)	Peak position
Mexico Airplay (Billboard) "La Chona Challenge"	21
US Latin Digital Song Sales (Billboard)	16
US Latin Streaming Songs (Billboard)	22
US Regional Mexican Airplay (Billboard) "La Chona Challenge"	24

== Certifications ==
Certifications for "La Chona"
Region	Certification	Certified units/sales
United States (RIAA)	2× Platinum (Latin)	120,000^{‡}
^{‡} Sales+streaming figures based on certification alone.
