= Julio Jaramillo =

Ecuadorian singer and recording artist

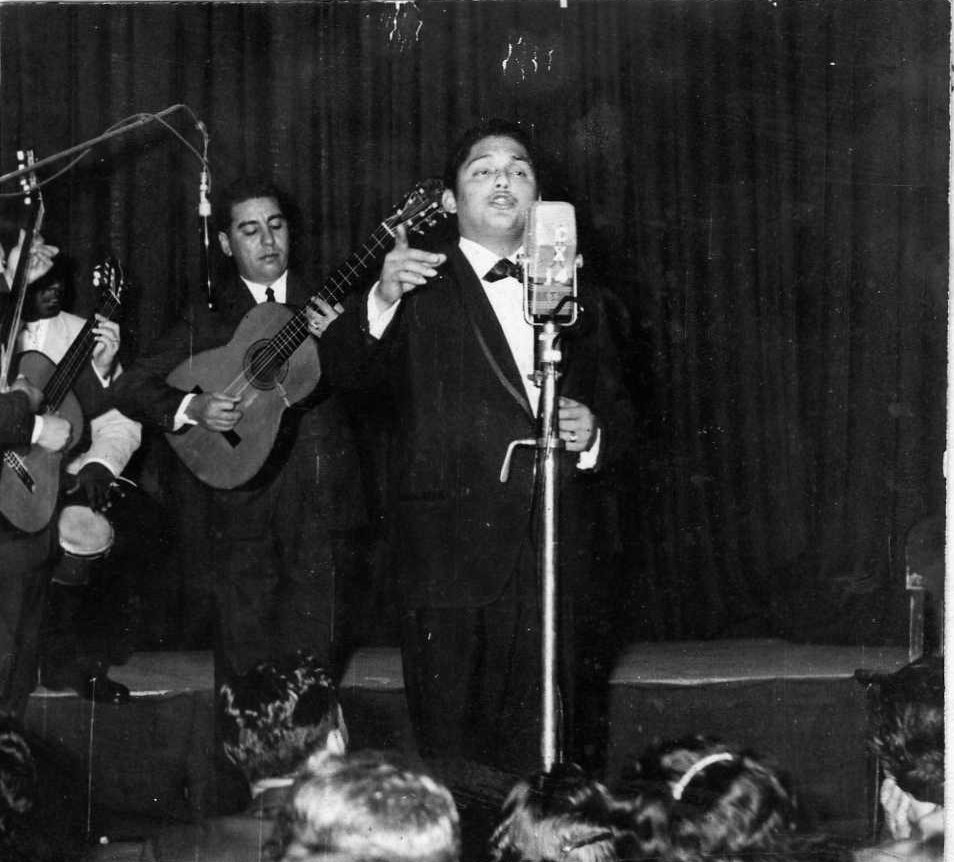
- Julio Jaramillo performing in 1956

Background information
- Also known as: J. J. (Jota Jota); El Ruiseñor de América (The Nightingale of America)
- Born: Julio Alfredo Jaramillo Laurido; 1 October 1935
- Origin: Guayaquil, Ecuador
- Died: 9 February 1978 (aged 42)
- Genres: bolero, pasillo, corrido, valse, tango, ranchera
- Instrument: Guitar
- Years active: 1950–1978
- Labels: Onix, Yoyo Music, Sonolux, Peerless, Codiscos, AB Station Records
- Website: https://juliojaramillolaurido.com/

Julio Alfredo Jaramillo Laurido (1 October 1935 – 9 February 1978), known as Julio Jaramillo, was an Ecuadorian singer, musician and composer who performed throughout Latin America. He achieved widespread fame for his specialty in the musical genres of bolero, vals, pasillo, corrido, tango and ranchera Throughout his career, he recorded more than 2,200 songs. His signature song, "Nuestro Juramento," remains popular across South America.

Jaramillo collaborated with numerous prominent Latin American artists, including Puerto Rican singer Daniel Santos, Ecuadorian singer Olimpo Cárdenas, and Colombian singer Alci Acosta.

== Biography ==
=== Childhood ===
Jaramillo was born in Guayaquil, Ecuador, to Juan Pantaleón Jaramillo Erazo and Apolonia Laurido Cáceres. His parents had moved to Guayaquil from the town of Machachi in search of better opportunities. He had two siblings: a sister, who died at age five, and a brother, Pepe.

By age 17 Jaramillo began to gain recognition for his warm and expressive voice, leading him to voice programs on the radio station El Cóndor. In 1950, he formed a trio with two friends.

=== Professional career ===
In 1954 Jaramillo recorded a duet with singer Fresia Saavedra called "Mi Pobre Querida Madre," which brought him initial recognition. The next year, he recorded "Esposa" with singer Carlos Rubira Infante

His breakthrough came in 1956 with the pasillo "Fatalidad," which was a major success. It sold 6,000 copies in its first week and, by the end of the year, he had recorded a dozen albums under the Bolivian music label, Onix.

Jaramillo began appearing on television and in films, debuting in Mala Mujer. His international acclaim grew following the release of the bolero "Nuestro Juramento" (1957), which led to tours of Ecuador, Colombia, Peru, Argentina, Uruguay, and Chile. The Mexican label Peerless arranged further tours in Peru and Chile. While touring in Colombia, he reunited with his brother Pepe, who had previously emigrated there. Jaramillo also performed frequently in theatres, where he gave pre-feature concerts that eventually expanded to two shows per day. Upon returning to Ecuador, he was arrested and conscripted into military service.

After returning to civilian life in 1960, Jaramillo resumed his career, achieving extended sellout engagements at Guayaquil's Guayas Theater. He appeared in the 1966 Ecuadorian film Fiebre de Juventud and another production in Argentina. In 1965, he settled in Venezuela and completed tours of Puerto Rico, Mexico and other countries in Central America. He also recorded duets with Daniel Santos, Olimpo Cárdenas, and Alci Acosta. Jaramillo's recording of "Amor Incomparable" debuted at number 18 on the New York City Latin American Single Hit Parade chart for the week of 27 January 1968. Record World’s February 10th issue reported the single at number 13 on the WHOM Latin Deejay chart. His final international tour took place in the United States and Canada.

=== Surgery and Death ===
After returning to Ecuador in 1975, Jaramillo hosted the radio program La hora de J.J. on Radio Cristal. In February 1978, he underwent a surgical procedure to remove gallstones. Jaramillo died on 9 February 1978 at the age of 42, following complications related to the surgery. Approximately 250,000 people attended his funeral in Guayaquil. His popularity in Ecuador has been compared to that of Frank Sinatra in the United States, Pedro Infante in Mexico, and Carlos Gardel in Argentina.

== Tributes ==
Since 1993, Jaramillo's birthday has been commemorated in Ecuador as the Día del Pasillo Ecuatoriano ( transl. Day of the Ecuadorian Pasillo). On 1 October 2019, Google celebrated his 84th birthday with a Google Doodle.

== Songs composed by Julio Jaramillo ==
According to All Music Guide

- A La Vuelta de la Esquina
- A Mi Madre
- Alguien Me Espera
- Aquellos Ojos
- Arrepentida
- Ay Mexicanita
- Bodas Negras
- Calla Corazón
- Cantando
- Caraqueñita
- Despertar Llorando
- Endechas
- Fiel Amigo
- Guayaquileña
- Hacia el Calvario
- Hermano
- Idolatria
- La Vuelta de la Esquina
- Llegastes
- Llora
- Mentiras y Nada Mas
- Mi Desengaño
- Mi Locura
- Naufragio de Amor
- No la Dejes Marchar
- No Soy Juez
- Que Culpa Tengo
- Que No Te Mire Nadie
- Si Tu Me Has Querido
- Siete Besos
- Sin Venganza
- Tus Besos Fueron Mio
- Vuelve Conmigo
- Yo Era Bueno
- Elsa
- Historia De Amor
- Perdon Por Adorarte
- No Me Lo Digas (tango)

== See also ==
- Los Chalchaleros
- Carlos Gardel
- Daniel Santos
- Pasillo
- Bolero
