= Jonathan Rodriguez =

Jonathan Rodriguez may refer to:

- Jonathan Rodríguez (basketball) (born 1987), Puerto Rican basketball player
- Jonathan Rodríguez (footballer, born 1993), Uruguayan football forward
- Jonathan Rodríguez (footballer, born 1994), Argentine football striker
- Jonathan Rodríguez (footballer, born 1990) (born 1990), Argentine football midfielder for Sepsi
- Johnny Rodriguez (soccer) (born 1998), American soccer striker for Oakland Roots

== See also ==
- Johnathan Rodríguez (born 1999), Puerto Rican baseball player
- John Rodríguez (disambiguation)
