= Héctor Ochoa Cárdenas =

Colombian composer (1934–2026)

- Born: 24 July 1934; Medellín, Colombia
- Died: 21 July 2026 (aged 91) La Ceja, Antioquia, Colombia

Héctor Ochoa Cárdenas (Note: In this name that follows Hispanic American naming customs, the first or paternal surname is Ochoa and the second or maternal family name is Cárdenas.) (24 July 1934 – 21 July 2026) was a Colombian musician and composer, best known for his song "El camino de la vida". Born in Medellín, he was the son of composer Eusebio Ochoa, from whom Ochoa learned music from a young age. At the age of 15, he founded a music group with his brother and a friend, playing at public events and on the city's radio. Ochoa left music as a career upon the death of his father in the 1950s, taking work at a bank. He worked in banking for the next 25 years. He eventually rose to the role of regional manager at the Banco de Bogotá until he retired from the industry in 1982. He continued to write music in his personal time, including the song "El camino de la vida". Dealing with the passage of life, it became known in Colombia after a November 1983 performance by the musical duo Arboleda and Valencia.

Ochoa was inducted into the Latin Songwriters Hall of Fame in 2015; he also received honors such as the "Orden de la Democracia del Congreso de la República", the "Escudo de Oro de Antioquia" (transl. Gold Shield of Antioquia), and the "Medalla Alcaldía de Medellín" (transl. Medellín City Hall Medal). He died on 21 July 2026 in La Ceja, Antioquia.

== Early life and career beginnings ==
Héctor Ochoa Cárdenas was born on 24 July 1934 in Medellín, Colombia, the son of composer and music teacher Eusebio Ochoa. He studied music, specifically plucked string instruments, from a young age, at the Escuela Superior de Música in Medellín, though his father discouraged him from pursuing a career as a musician out of concern for his financial welfare. When he was 15 and still in high school, he created the musical group Trío de Oro with his brother, Carlos Alberto, and a friend, Román Vélez. The group performed at public events and on radio stations around Medellín; Ochoa performed or wrote over 500 songs with the group. Ochoa also sang his own music and performed jazz, playing the guitar in a jazz quartet.

When Ochoa was young, his father, Eusebio, took ill and died in 1955. Ochoa was one of the elder children and thus had to work to support himself, his mother, and eight of his siblings. He stopped working in music, keeping it instead as a hobby, and took a job as a messenger at the Banco Cafetero, and eventually became a regional manager at the Banco de Bogotá in Medellín. He kept his interest in music a secret from his colleagues, fearing it would interfere with his career if he were to be associated with something less serious. He retired from finance in 1982, after working in banking for 25 years, and began taking to music in earnest.

== Music ==
Ochoa's first work to be recorded and released was Bendito amor; singer Víctor Hugo Ayala heard Ochoa sing the song and asked if he could record it.

He continued to write music while working at the Banco Cafetero. On one day off, he wrote "El camino de la vida", a song which would become one of his best known pieces. While his other songs could take up to three or four months to write, Ochoa remembered that "El camino de la vida" took twelve hours on just one day. His wife, who brought him food so he could write, uninterrupted, was the first to hear the song. The song was first performed publicly by the musical duo Arboleda and Valencia on 19 November 1983. Their performance and the song's lyrics, which described life from a child to adult, helped the song become popular in Colombia and, in 1999, Radio Nacional de Colombia ran a poll which declared it to be the Song of the Century.

Later in his life, Ochoa served on the board of directors of SAYCO (Sociedad de Autores y Compositores), judged music competitions and, until 2006, spent over a decade directing Antioquia le Canta a Colombia, an organization dedicated to promoting the traditional music of the Antioquia region in Colombia. His hometown, Medellín, installed his name along with 24 other influential Antioquians on a walk of fame in a shopping center in 2004. He was nominated for the Latin Songwriters Hall of Fame once in 2012 before being inducted in 2015. Other awards received by Ochoa include the Orden de la Democracia del Congreso de la República, the Escudo de Oro de Antioquia (transl. Gold Shield of Antioquia), and the Medalla Alcaldía de Medellín (transl. Medellín City Hall Medal ). The Festival de Música Andina Mono Núñez held a tribute for him in 2023.

=== Compositions ===
Ochoa worked with Colombian Andean music; he could play the guitar, play the tiple, and sing. His work often described daily life in his native Antioquia and his best known songs include "El camino de la vida", "Muy antioqueño", "Pase lo que pase", and "Tú, lo mejor de todo". Songs composed by Ochoa include:

- Aprendiendo a vivir
- Ayer y hoy
- Bendito amor (1962)
- Canta tiple
- Después que me olvidé de ti
- El amor no acaba
- El camino de la vida
- Ella es mi reina
- La nostalgia
- Lo mejor de mí
- Muy antioqueño
- Muy colombiano
- Orgullosamente mujer
- Pase lo que pase
- Tú, lo mejor de todo
- Volvé maestro

== Personal life and death ==
Ochoa was married for over 50 years to María Estela Lalinde, also known as "Stella"; she was not a trained musician and so Ochoa would often show his work to her to gauge her interest and, by extension, that of the wider public. The couple had four children.

Héctor Ochoa died in La Ceja, Antioquia on 21 July 2026, three days before his 92nd birthday. His death was confirmed by Andrés Julián Rendón, the governor of Antioquia.
