= 365 Días =

Studio album by Los Tucanes de Tijuana
- Released: 31 January 2012
- Genre: Regional Mexican; norteño; banda
- Length: 57:36
- Language: Spanish
- Label: Fonovisa

Los Tucanes de Tijuana chronology
El árbol (2010)	365 Días (2012)	Antología musical: 25 Años (2012)

Singles from 365 Días
- 1. "Amor compartido" Released: November 2011

Professional ratings
Review scores
Source	Rating
AllMusic	3.5/5 stars

365 Días (transl. 365 Days) is the 32nd studio album by regional Mexican band Los Tucanes de Tijuana. It was released on 31 January 2012 via Fonovisa Records.

The album won the Latin Grammy Award for Best Norteño Album and was nominated for the Grammy Award for Best Música Mexicana Album (including Tejano).

== Recording and composition ==
The album was recorded at the group's new studio in Chula Vista, California. It comprises 12 songs in the band's classic norteño style, as well as six versions done in the banda sinaloense style.

== Promotion and release ==
The album's lead single, "Amor compartido", was released in November 2011. The corresponding music video, released on 27 January 2012, was shot in Honduras at the ruins of Copán and the Fortaleza de San Fernando; the band thanked the Instituto Hondureño de Antropología e Historia for allowing them to film at the protected sites.

The album was released on 31 January 2012. Those who pre-ordered the album on iTunes received a free download of the single "Julián Pérez", the main song in the movie Saving Private Perez. Following the project's release, the band went on an eponymous tour of both Mexico and the U.S. in support of the album from March to June.

After starting their tour, the band recorded music videos for "365 Días" and "Rehabilitado" in Jalisco, both of which starred Colombian actress Ximena Córdoba. The former, released on 22 May 2012, was filmed in the tallest building in Guadalajara, the Hotel Riu Plaza, and includes shots from a helicopter. The latter was released on 19 March 2013 and was shot in the town of Tequila.

== Critical reception ==
The album was rated 3.5 out of 5 stars by David Jeffries of AllMusic. Comparing it to their previous narcocorrido album, he wrote that "365 Dias brings the love song back into the group's life". He added: "The band sound invigorated after leaving the topic aside for an album, and while this is a lightweight effort compared to El Arbol, the band are equally committed to the material."

== Accolades ==
Awards and nominations for 365 Días
Year	Organization	Category	Result	Ref.
2012	Latin Grammy Awards	Best Norteño Album	Won	
2013	Grammy Awards	Best Música Mexicana Album (including Tejano)	Nominated	

== Track listing ==
All tracks are written by Mario Quintero Lara

365 Días
No.	Title	Length
1.	"Amor Compartido"	3:49
2.	"Rehabilitado"	3:16
3.	"365 Días"	3:07
4.	"Si Un Gato Muere"	3:15
5.	"Me Acostumbré A Tus Besos"	3:18
6.	"La Vida Es Alegría"	3:13
7.	"Soltero Y Con Dinero"	3:25
8.	"Ya No Te Quiero"	3:18
9.	"Salió Del Closet"	3:12
10.	"Gracias Porque Te Fuiste"	3:02
11.	"La Perra De Parra"	3:14
12.	"Furia Musical"	3:04
13.	"Gracias Porque Te Fuiste - Banda Sinaloense Version"	2:55
14.	"Rehabilitado - Banda Sinaloense Version"	3:47
15.	"Salió Del Closet - Banda Sinaloense Version"	3:01
16.	"365 Días - Banda Sinaloense Version"	2:30
17.	"Me Acostumbré A Tus Besos - Banda Sinaloense Version"	2:54
18.	"Si Un Gato Muere - Banda Sinaloense Version"	3:07
Total length:		57:36

== Charts ==
Chart performance for 365 Días
Chart (2012)	Peak position
US Billboard 200	171
US Regional Mexican Albums (Billboard)	2
US Top Latin Albums (Billboard)	3
