= Benito de Jesús =

Puerto Rican musician

- Born: October 25, 1912; Barceloneta, Puerto Rico
- Died: June 24, 2010 (aged 97); Hato Rey, Puerto Rico
- Occupation: songwriter

Benito de Jesús (October 25, 1912 — June 24, 2010) was a legendary Puerto Rican songwriter of romantic ballads, including "Nuestro Juramento", "La copa rota", and "Sigamos pecando". He was also founder of the group Trio Vegabajeño.

He died on June 24, 2010, at the age of 97 at Auxilio Mutuo Hospital in Hato Rey, Puerto Rico.
