= Eladio Torres =

Puerto Rican musician

- Born: July 25, 1950 (age 75); Bayamón, Puerto Rico
- Genres: Danza, Bolero, Plena, Bomba, Folk, Pop
- Occupation: Poet / Musician / Composer / Singer
- Instrument: Guitar

Eladio Torres, (born July 25, 1950) is a Puerto Rican poet, musician, composer and singer. He is the author of "Tú Vives en mi Pensamiento" ("You Live in my Thoughts") a Puerto Rican Danza. Versions have been performed and recorded by Marco Antonio Muñíz, Danny Rivera, Ruth Fernández, Cheo Feliciano and Orquesta Filarmónica de Puerto Rico (Puerto Rico Philharmonic Orchestra). Torres is a composer of popular musical genres.

== Musical career ==
External audio
- Luciano Quiñones piano interpretation of Torres' "Tu vives en mi Pensamiento".

Back in Puerto Rico, during the 70's Torres co-founded the group known as 'Alborada' (Light of Dawn), with a group of fellow musicians. He participated as a composer, musician and singer. Puerto Rican singer Danny Rivera joined the group, singing and recording a number of Torres' songs in the 'Danny Rivera Alborada' album. Among those songs Torres included his danza: "Tú Vives En Mi Pensamiento" (You Live in my Thoughts). Along with the success of the whole album, the unexpected insertion of "Tú Vives en mi Pensamiento" ended up being a fundamental piece in the rebirth of the Danza genre in Puerto Rico. This composition is the second of a triptych of danzas that Torres titled "El Ideal" (The ideal), the first one being “Alma Gemela”' (Soul Mate), and the third one, the unpublished “Dama de mi Claridad” (Lady of My Clarity).

In 1978, Eladio recorded his album Eladio Torres/Uno, as a singer and songwriter. The album covered a variety of genres. There he included "El Silencio" (The Silence), a danza with a modern twist in its lyric. Torres is also an accomplished writer. As a poet, under the auspices of the Puerto Rican Institute of Culture (ICP), he published his book of poems: Poemas de la Dualidad (Poems of Duality)

== Later years ==
Torres could not make a living in his native island. He moved back to the United States where he earned a degree in Psychology. He currently lives there with his wife Heli Davila, and works as a counseling specialist at a mental health clinic. His latest unpublished danza, “Camafeo” is dedicated to his wife.

On April 26, 1972, the Government of Puerto Rico approved 'Ley #20' (Law #20), which established "La Semana de la Danza" (Danza Week). In May 2010, the Institute of Puerto Rican Culture, which was in charge of the festivities, dedicated "La Semana de la Danza" to Eladio Torres. Various versions of "Tú Vives En Mi Pensamiento" were played during Torres' tribute and recognition.

== See also ==
- List of Puerto Ricans
- Puerto Rican songwriters
