= Mario Quintero Lara =

Mexican musician and philanthropist

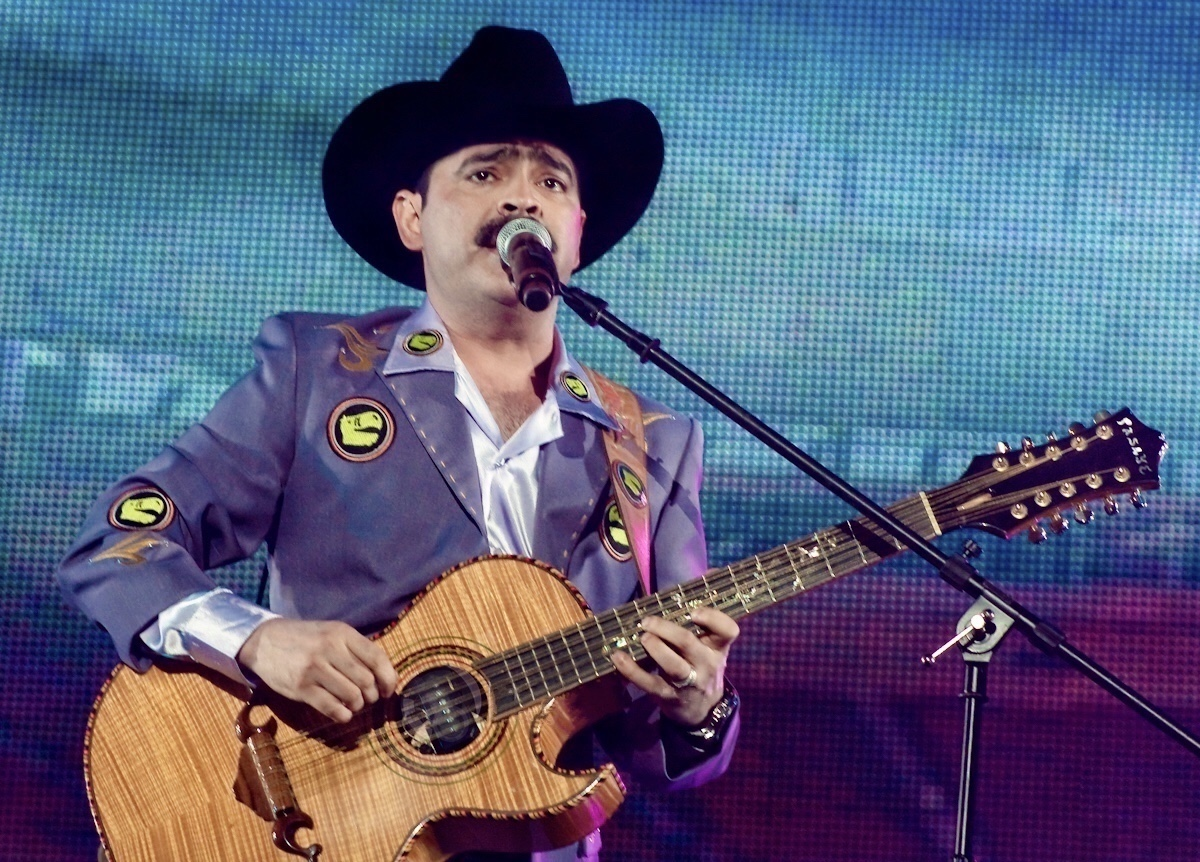
- Lara performing in 2010

Background information
- Born: Las Huacapas, Sinaloa, Mexico
- Genres: Pacific Norteño
- Occupations: Musician; philanthropist
- Instruments: Vocals, Bajo sexto
- Works: Los Tucanes de Tijuana discography
- Years active: 1987–present
- Member of: Los Tucanes de Tijuana

Mario Quintero Lara is a Mexican musician and philanthropist who is the leader and primary songwriter of the Regional Mexican band Los Tucanes de Tijuana. During his career, he has achieved more than thirty BMI awards, including a Songwriter of the Year award in 1999 and a BMI Presidential Award in 2019.

As a member of Los Tucanes de Tijuana, Quintero has earned 34 gold and 30 platinum albums and has managed to sell more than twenty million albums worldwide, in addition to participating in events like Coachella Valley Music and Arts Festival, Pal Norte and Vive Latino, among others.

Winner of the Latin Grammy in 2012 for the album 365 Días, his compositions have been part of the soundtracks of film and television productions such as Perdita Durango, Salvando al soldado Pérez, El infierno, El Chema, Señora Acero, El Americano: The Movie or Alias el Mexicano. His philanthropic work highlights his association with the charity organization Children International, of which he is a sponsor.

== Biography ==
=== 1980s and 1990s ===
Born in the small town of Las Huacapas, Sinaloa, Quintero moved to Tijuana to continue his high school studies and to join his cousins Mario Moreno and Joel Higuera, with whom he formed the regional Mexican music group Los Tucanes de Tijuana. The band, officially registered in 1987, was initially formed by Quintero, Moreno, Higuera and David Servín.

After performing locally, Quintero decided to move with his group to the city of Chula Vista, California to try his luck in the Latin clubs of Los Angeles. In the 1990's he began recording albums prolifically with the group, providing songwriting, lead vocals and bajo sexto from its inception to the present. As the band's leader and songwriter, he has recorded 36 albums to date and has earned 30 platinum and 34 gold records.

Throughout his career, Quintero has written more than 600 songs, including commercially successful compositions such as "La chona", "El Tucanazo", "La chica sexy", "Mundo de amor", "Mis tres animales", "El centenario" and "Secuestro de amor". In 1997 he contributed the compositions "El puño de polvo" and "El cartel de a kilo" for the soundtrack of the Spanish film Perdita Durango, directed by Álex de la Iglesia. Two years later, his song "Secuestro de amor" appeared in the Chilean film Tuve un sueño contigo.

=== 2000s, 2010s and present ===
At the invitation of Mexico's Tourism Promotion Council, Quintero composed in 2008 the song "México es tu casa", produced by Mexico's Industria Films Studios and used to promote tourism in the country. In 2010 he wrote three songs that were part of the soundtrack of the Mexican film El infierno, directed by Luis Estrada. That same year, the costume design used by the musician in the band's performances was exhibited at the Grammy Museum, in the "Great Latin Stars" display, where outfits of other artists like Ricky Martin, Banda el Recodo, Celia Cruz and Los Tigres del Norte also appeared.

In 2011 he composed the song "Julián Pérez" for the film Salvando al soldado Pérez, by director Beto Gómez, and in 2013 he contributed the theme song for the Fox Telecolombia series Alias el Mexicano, titled "El papá de los pollitos". A year later he composed the theme song for the Telemundo series Señora Acero, and received an invitation to be one of the judges on the competition show Yo soy el artista, along with Olga Tañón and Luis Fonsi.

In 2016 he wrote the song "El Chema", performed by Banda el Recodo and used as the main theme for the television series El Chema, and contributed a composition titled "El perico Cuco" for the Mexican-American animated film El Americano: The Movie. In February 2017, Fox Deportes announced that Quintero would be the image of the opening video for the fifty-first edition of the Super Bowl.

In February 2019, he participated along with his bandmate Alfredo González in the celebration of the eightieth anniversary of Don Cruz Lizárraga's Banda el Recodo, singing the corrido "La clave nueva" as a duet at the Teodoro Mariscal stadium in Mazatlán.

== Awards and recognitions ==
For his work as a songwriter, Quintero received four BMI Awards in 1999 for the songs "Es verdad", "El Tucanazo", "Secuestro de amor" and "Hacemos bonita pareja", and was also honored as songwriter of the year at the same event alongside Latin artists like as Kike Santander, Shakira and Robi Draco Rosa.

Quintero continued to receive awards from BMI in the following years, winning his 27th award in 2012 for the composition "El jefe de la sierra", from the album El árbol. Also in 2012 he won his first Latin Grammy as a member of Los Tucanes de Tijuana in the category of norteño album of the year for 365 Días, and was honored by other artists such as Banda el Recodo, La Original Banda el Limón, Calibre 50, El Potro de Sinaloa, Julión Álvarez and Raza Obrera in the album Tributo a Mario Quintero: El papá de los pollitos.

In 2019 he received the BMI Presidential Award in honor of his artistic career. The same year he was nominated for the 2019 Latin Songwriters Hall of Fame, sharing the list with other artists like Joan Manuel Serrat, Pablo Milanés, Rubén Blades and Oscar D'León. In December 2020 he received another special mention from BMI for his career as a songwriter. In 2022, Quintero was one of the winners of the BMI Awards, this time with the songs "La captura III" and "La buena vida".

== Discography ==
=== Studio albums and compilations ===
- 1994 – Clave nueva
- 1995 – Mundo de amor
- 1995 – 14 Tucanazos bien pesados
- 1997 – Tucanes de oro
- 1997 – Tucanes de plata
- 1998 – Amor platónico
- 1998 – Los más buscados
- 2000 – Me gusta vivir de noche
- 2000 – Corridos de primera plana
- 2001 – Al por mayor
- 2002 – Jugo a la vida
- 2003 – Imperio
- 2003 – Amor descarado
- 2004 – El virus del amor
- 2004 – Fiesta en la sierra
- 2006 – Amante de lo bueno
- 2007 – El papá de los pollitos
- 2008 – Propiedad privada
- 2008 – Soy todo tuyo
- 2009 – Retro-corridos
- 2010 – El árbol
- 2012 – 365 Días
- 2012 – Antología musical: 25 Aniversario
- 2014 – Corridos Time Season One: Soy parrandero
- 2014 – Perdóname mi amor
- 2016 – Corridos Time Season Two: Los implacables
- 2018 – Prueba superada
- 2020 – Corridos Time Season Three: Comandante en jefe
