= John Rodríguez =

John or Johnny Rodríguez may refer to:

== Entertainment ==
- Johnny Rodriguez, American singer
- Johnny "Dandy" Rodríguez, American percussionist
- John Anthony "Johnny" Rodriguez, American musician also known as 54 Ultra

== Sports ==
- John Rodriguez (baseball), American baseball player
- Johnny Rodríguez (basketball), Puerto Rican basketball player
- Jhon Édison Rodríguez, Colombian fencer
- Johnny Rodriguez (soccer), American soccer player

== Others ==
- John Rodriguez (politician) (1937–2017), Guyanese-born Canadian politician

== See also ==
- Johnny Rodz (John Rodriguez, born 1938), American professional wrestler
- Johnny Ray (comedian) (Johnny Ray Rodríguez), American comedian
- Jonathan Rodriguez (disambiguation)
