= Los Tucanes de Tijuana =

Mexican norteño band

Los Tucanes De Tijuana
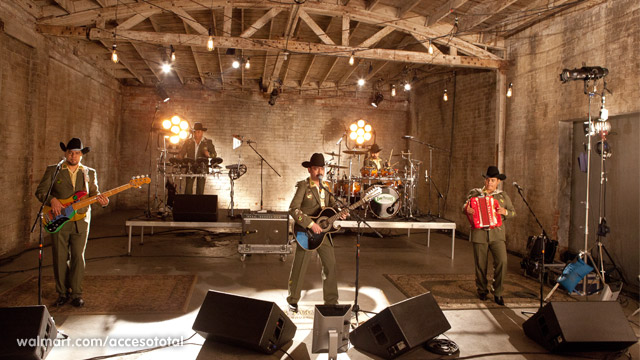

Background information
- Origin: Tijuana, Baja California, Mexico
- Genres: Pacific Norteño
- Years active: 1987–present
- Labels: EMI (1995–99); Universal Music Latin (2000–05); Fonovisa (2006–2016); Master Q Music (2017–present)
- Members: Mario Quintero Lara (1987–present); David Jesus “Chuyito” Fabela Servín Raya (1987–present); Alfredo González González (2002–present); Gustavo Labrada Valenzuela (2002–present); Luis Adrián Cazares Gómez (2018–present)
- Past members: Joel Higuera Acosta (+) (1987–2002); Mario Moreno Quintero (1987–2011); Clemente Flores Mondaca (1999–2011); Tomás Alberto Herrera (2011–2018)
- Website: lostucanesdetijuana.com

Los Tucanes De Tijuana (English: The Toucans of Tijuana) are a Mexican norteño band led by Mario Quintero Lara. The band was founded in Tijuana, Baja California in 1987. They, along with Los Tigres del Norte, were pioneers in playing their music in a rougher manner as opposed to the traditional norteño music of northeastern Mexico, subsequently influencing many other norteño artists from Mexico’s pacific states and giving that region of the country its signature norteño sound. During their career, Los Tucanes de Tijuana have garnered several awards and recognitions, including a Latin Grammy in 2012 for the album 365 Días, five Grammy Award nominations, nine Lo Nuestro Awards nominations and multiple BMI Awards for Quintero as a composer. They are the first norteño music band to obtain an international film award by winning the Un Certain Regard Angel Film award at the Monaco International Film Festival for their participation in the documentary Los ilegales. In 2008, the group received a star on the Las Vegas Walk of Fame.

In 2019 they became the first regional Mexican music group to perform at the Coachella Valley Music and Arts Festival, held in Indio, California, and have also participated in important musical events in their native country and in other territories like Vive Latino and Pa'l Norte festivals. They have sold more than 25 million albums worldwide and have obtained 34 gold and 30 platinum records. Songs from their repertoire like "La chona", "El tucanazo", "La chica sexy", "Vivir de noche" and "El centenario" are popular on radio stations and music platforms, and some of their record productions have made it onto some charts in the United States.

== History ==
=== 1983–1999: Formation ===
The group was formed in 1983 and formalized in 1987 in Tijuana, Baja California by musicians Mario Quintero Lara, Mario Moreno, Joel Higuera and David Servín Raya, who came from Sinaloa and settled in Baja California to pursue a musical career. Initially they played in small venues or family parties, until they decided to move to Los Angeles to play in the Latin club circuit.

The band began to enjoy recognition both in their native Mexico and in the United States, where they settled. During the 1990s, the group recorded around twenty albums, including Me robaste el corazón (1994), Mundo de amor (1995) and Amor platónico (1998). Between 1996 and 1997 they managed to place six titles simultaneously on Billboard's Top Latin Albums chart, becoming the only band to do so to date. After recording several albums with the label Alacrán Records, in the middle of the decade they obtained a recording contract with Emi Latin.

In 1999, Mario Quintero received his first four BMI awards for the songs "Es verdad", "El tucanazo", "Secuestro de amor" and "Hacemos bonita pareja". A year later he was recognized as composer of the year at the same event, along with other artists such as Kike Santander, Robi Draco Rosa and Shakira. During his career, Quintero has won more than thirty BMI awards as a composer.

=== 2000–2009: International consolidation ===
The band began the 2000s with nominations to Lo Nuestro and Latin Grammy Awards for the album Al por mayor and with the release of the album Me gusta vivir de noche, nominated for the 2002 ALMA Awards. Their next albums, Jugo a la vida (2002) and Imperio (2003), were nominated for the Grammy Awards (in the category of Best Mexican/Mexican-American Album) and the Latin Grammy Awards (for Best Norteño Album). After achieving nominations for Lo Nuestro Awards in 2002 and 2004, in 2006 the band signed a recording contract with Univision Music Group label, with which they released the album Siempre contigo, recorded live at a performance at the Zócalo in Mexico City. A year later they recorded the album El papá de los pollitos at the Signature Sound studio in San Diego, California.

In December 2007 they became the first norteño music group to win an international film award when they received the "Un Certain Regard Angel Film" prize at the Monaco International Film Festival for their participation in the documentary Los ilegales, directed by Miguel Ángel Varela Fimbres. In July 2008 Mexico Tourism Board invited them to compose and perform the song "México es tu casa", which was used to promote tourism in the country.

In September, the band received a star on the Las Vegas Walk of Fame. At the ceremony, Congressman Rubén Jesús Kihuen declared September 11 as the official day of Los Tucanes de Tijuana and issued a "Certificate of Praise" in honor of their trajectory. The album Soy todo tuyo was nominated at the Grammy Awards for Best Norteño Album in 2009, and a year later the album Retro-corridos received a nomination in the same category at the Latin Grammy Awards.

=== 2010–2019: Participation in major festivals ===
On February 4, 2010, the suit used by Mario Quintero in the band's performances was exhibited at the Grammy Museum in the "Great Latin Stars" display, along with outfits by Celia Cruz, Ricky Martin, Banda el Recodo and Los Tigres del Norte. During the event, the group gave an interview and an acoustic performance. That same year they were nominated as Norteño Artist of the Year at Lo Nuestro Awards, a distinction they repeated in 2011, when they also performed the song "Soy todo tuyo" at the event's gala. In October 2011 they received the Legacy Award for their artistic career at the Billboard Mexican Music Awards, in a celebration held at the Orpheum Theatre in Los Angeles. Likewise, the album El árbol received nominations at both the Grammy and the Latin Grammy Awards, in the categories of Best Regional Mexican Music Album and Best Norteño Album, respectively. In August 2012, several groups representing the norteño genre such as Banda El Recodo, La Original Banda El Limón, Calibre 50 and Banda MS recorded an album of corridos in tribute to Los Tucanes de Tijuana. The same month, Alfredo González was recognized as Accordionist of the Year at the Premios de la Calle, held in Los Angeles.

In September 2012, the documentary Hecho en México was released, a film directed by British filmmaker Duncan Bridgeman about Mexican cultural diversity, in which the band participated along with other musical exponents of the country such as Molotov, Alejandro Fernández, Gloria Trevi and Rubén Albarrán. In November, the group won a Latin Grammy Award in the category of Best Norteño Album for their record 365 Días. Los Tucanes de Tijuana had already been nominated five times in that same category.

In June 2013 they contributed the song "La canción de Cuco" for the soundtrack of the animated film El Americano: The Movie, directed by Ricardo Arnaiz and Mike Kunkel. On July the band was recognized as "Ambassador of Norteño Music" at the Mexiga Festival held in the town of Villagarcía de Arosa in Pontevedra, Spain, and a month later they received recognition from the Council of Mexican Federations for their participation in the aforementioned soundtrack and for their support of immigration reform. In March 2014, the album Corridos Time Season One: Soy parrandero achieved the top spot on the Billboard Regional Mexican Albums chart.

In June 2014, Telemundo invited Los Tucanes de Tijuana to compose and perform the theme song for the series Señora Acero. Three months later, Quintero participated along with Luis Fonsi and Olga Tañón as one of the judges on the reality show Yo soy el artista, produced by the same network. On September 15, the band performed at the celebration of the Grito de Independencia in Culiacán, Sinaloa. For the first time in their career, their repertoire consisted of cumbias, ballads and rancheras, as they did not perform corridos during their presentation. They ended the year with a concert at the Cárdenas Festival, held at the Auto Club Speedway in Fontana, California.

In early 2016, Los Tucanes de Tijuana appeared on the premiere of El Americano: The Movie. The same year, Quintero was again invited by Telemundo to compose and produce the song "El Chema", which was used as the theme song for the series of the same name and performed by Banda El Recodo. In January 2017, the band was invited by FOX to be part of the opening video for Super Bowl LI, between Atlanta Falcons and New England Patriots.

In April 2018, the BBC visited Master Q Music studios to conduct a series of interviews with the band members to be included in the documentary Sound of the Border, a film about the impact of Norteño music on the U.S.-Mexico border. In November 2018, they were recognized during the "Homenaje a los Grandes de México" at the 2018 Premios de La Radio, organized by Estrella TV.

In February 2019, Mario Quintero and Alfredo González participated in the eightieth anniversary celebration of Don Cruz Lizárraga's Banda El Recodo. At the event, they sang the corrido "La clave nueva" as a duet at the Teodoro Mariscal stadium in Mazatlán. A month later, Quintero was recognized with the BMI Presidential Award in recognition of his musical trajectory. After appearing on the surprise stage at the Festival Pa'l Norte in Monterrey in March, in April Los Tucanes de Tijuana became the first norteño music group to perform at the Coachella Valley Music and Arts Festival in Indio, California. The same month they participated in #ElEvento40, a rock and pop concert held at the Autódromo Hermanos Rodríguez in Mexico City, and in the Semana Santa Festival in Mazatlán.

=== 2020–present ===
After appearing in February 2020 at the SAP Center in San Jose, California along with Los Tigres del Norte, in March they performed on the second day of the Vive Latino Festival at the Foro Sol in Mexico City, an event that mainly hosts rock musicians. On September they gave a virtual concert from Tijuana for the national holidays. The free event, presented by the municipal president Arturo González Cruz, registered an audience of more than 300 000 live spectators and meant the return of the group to the city where they started their musical career after twelve years. In 2008, members of the band were banned from Tijuana by the then Secretary of Security Julián Leyzaola due to the content of some of their songs. In 2023, the ban was lifted by the city with an announcement that they would play their first show in the city in 15 years. On December 30, 2020 Joel Higuera, accordionist of the band between 1987 and 2002, died of a heart attack.

On August 25, 2021 the band was invited by the San Diego Padres to throw out the first pitch at the game they played against the Los Angeles Dodgers at Petco Park in San Diego. In the event they promote a free concert at the same venue, which was held on September 26 of the same year as part of the Hispanic Heritage Month.

== Band members ==
- Mario Quintero Lara - Bajo sexto, lead vocals (1987–present)
- David Servín Raya - Drums (1987–2002), percussion (2002–present)
- Alfredo González González - Accordion, second voice (2002–present)
- Gustavo Labrada Valenzuela - Drums (2002–present)
- Luis Adrián Cazares Gómez - Bass (2018–present)

Former Members

- Joel Higuera Acosta - Accordion, second voice (1987–2002; died 2020)
- Mario Moreno Quintero - Bass, backing vocals (1987–2011)
- Clemente Flores Mondaca - Keyboards, bajo quinto (1999–2011)
- Tomás Alberto Herrera de Haro - Bass (2011–2018)

== Discography ==
=== Studio albums and compilations ===
- 1994 - Me robaste el corazón
- 1994 - Clave nueva
- 1995 - Mundo de amor
- 1995 - 14 Tucanazos bien pesados
- 1997 - Tucanes de oro
- 1997 - Tucanes de plata
- 1998 - Amor platónico
- 1998 - Los más buscados
- 2000 - Me gusta vivir de noche
- 2000 - Corridos de primera plana
- 2001 - Al por mayor
- 2002 - Jugo a la vida
- 2003 - Imperio
- 2003 - Amor descarado
- 2004 - El virus del amor
- 2004 - Fiesta en la sierra
- 2006 - Amante de lo bueno
- 2007 - El papá de los pollitos
- 2008 - Propiedad privada
- 2008 - Soy todo tuyo
- 2009 - Retro-corridos
- 2010 - El árbol
- 2012 - 365 Días
- 2012 - Antología musical: 25 Aniversario
- 2014 - Corridos Time Season One: Soy parrandero
- 2014 - Perdóname mi amor
- 2016 - Corridos Time Season Two: Los implacables
- 2018 - Prueba superada
- 2020 - Corridos Time Season Three: Comandante en jefe
- 2022 - Retro-Corridos Vol. 2

=== Live albums ===
- 2006– Siempre contigo
- 2007– 20 Aniversario (en vivo desde Hollywood)

=== Singles ===
Song	Year	Album
"Amor compartido"	2011	365 Días
"Panchito el F1"	2015	Corridos Time Season Two: Los Implacables
"A mover el bote"	2017	Prueba superada
"La coyote"	2017	Non-album single
"Parrandeando"	2018	Prueba superada
"La justiciera de la frontera"	2018	Non-album single
"Prueba superada"	2018	Prueba superada
"La ley de Murphy"	2018	Non-album singles
"Ranchero y medio"	2019	Non-album singles
"La chona challenge"	2019	Non-album singles
"El agricultor" (with Tapy Quintero)	2019	Non-album singles
"La buena vida"	2020	Non-album singles
"La captura III"	2020	Corridos Time Season Three: Comandante en jefe
"El nacional"	2020	Corridos Time Season Three: Comandante en jefe
"El peligroso"	2020	Corridos Time Season Three: Comandante en jefe
"Comandante en jefe"	2021	Corridos Time Season Three: Comandante en jefe
"Mis tres animales" (with La Original Banda El Limón)	2021	Non-album singles
"El Chavo" (with El Fantasma)	2021	Non-album singles
"La Tierra del Corrido" (with Fuerza Regida and Edén Muñoz)	2023	Non-album singles
"La Mera Mera" (with Juan Gabriel)	2023	Non-album singles
"La Firma del Flaquito"	2023	Non-album singles
"Comandante 09"	2023	Non-album singles

== Awards and nominations ==
=== Grammy Awards ===
Year	Category	Nominated work	Result
2002	Best Mexican/Mexican-American Album	Jugo a la vida	Nominated
2003	Best Mexican/Mexican-American Album	Imperio	Nominated
2009	Best Norteño Album	Soy todo tuyo	Nominated
2011	Best Regional Mexican Music Album	El árbol	Nominated
2012	Best Regional Mexican Music Album	365 Días	Nominated

=== Latin Grammy Awards ===
Year	Category	Nominated work	Result
2000	Best Norteño Album	Al por mayor	Nominated
2001	Best Norteño Album	Me gusta vivir de noche	Nominated
2003	Best Norteño Album	Jugo a la vida	Nominated
2004	Best Regional Mexican Song	"Imperio"	Nominated
2009	Best Regional Mexican Song	"Se fue mi amor"	Nominated
2010	Best Norteño Album	Retro-corridos	Nominated
2011	Best Norteño Album	El árbol	Nominated
2011	Best Regional Mexican Song	"El jefe de la sierra"	Nominated
2012	Best Norteño Album	365 Días	Won

=== Lo Nuestro Awards ===
Year	Category	Nominated work	Result
1999	Regional Mexican Album of the Year	Amor platónico	Nominated
1999	Regional Mexican Group or Duo of the Year	Los Tucanes de Tijuana	Nominated
2000	Regional Mexican Album of the Year	Al por mayor	Nominated
2000	Regional Mexican Song of the Year	"Amor platónico"	Nominated
2002	Regional Mexican Song of the Year	"El amor soñado"	Nominated
2002	Norteño Performance	Los Tucanes de Tijuana	Nominated
2004	Album of the Year	Imperio	Nominated
2004	Norteño Performance	Los Tucanes de Tijuana	Nominated
2010	Regional Mexican Group or Duo of the Year	Los Tucanes de Tijuana	Nominated
2011	Regional Mexican Group or Duo of the Year	Los Tucanes de Tijuana	Nominated

== See also ==
- List of best-selling Latin music artists
