= Vicente Carattini =

Puerto Rican musician

Background information
- Born: Ernesto Vicente Carattini; November 11, 1939; Cidra, Puerto Rico
- Died: November 7, 2005 (aged 65) Río Piedras, Puerto Rico
- Genres: Puerto Rican Folk Music
- Occupations: Singer and composer
- Instrument: Puerto Rican Cuatro

Vicente Carattini (née Ernesto Vicente Carattini; November 11, 1939 – November 7, 2005) was a singer and composer of Puerto Rican Christmas-related songs.

== Early years ==
Carattini was born and raised in the town of Cidra, Puerto Rico where he received his primary and secondary education. His father realized that the young Carattini was fascinated with Puerto Rican folk music and presented him with a Puerto Rican cuatro. A cuatro is a Puerto Rican stringed instrument somewhat similar to a guitar but smaller in size. The Puerto Rican cuatro has five pairs of strings for a total of ten, and is different from the cuatro in other Latin American countries (for example, the Venezuelan cuatro actually has four strings). At the age of nine, Carattini learned how to play the cuatro by asking those in town who knew how to play the instrument to teach him. In 1950, his father gave him a better quality cuatro and a guitar.

In 1956, when Carattini was 15 years old, he formed the "Trío Los Juglares", which dedicated itself to singing boleros. The trio included the vocals of Felito Félix and performed basically in Cidra. However, Felito Félix left the following year and the trio was dissolved.

Carattini continued to go to school and graduated from the Jesus T. Piñero high school of Cidra. In 1958, he enrolled in the Catholic University of Puerto Rico in Ponce and after one year transferred to the University of Puerto Rico in Río Piedras. In 1960, he earned his teacher's certificate and in 1961 his Bachelor of Science degree. He returned to his hometown and became a teacher.

== La Tuna de Cayey ==
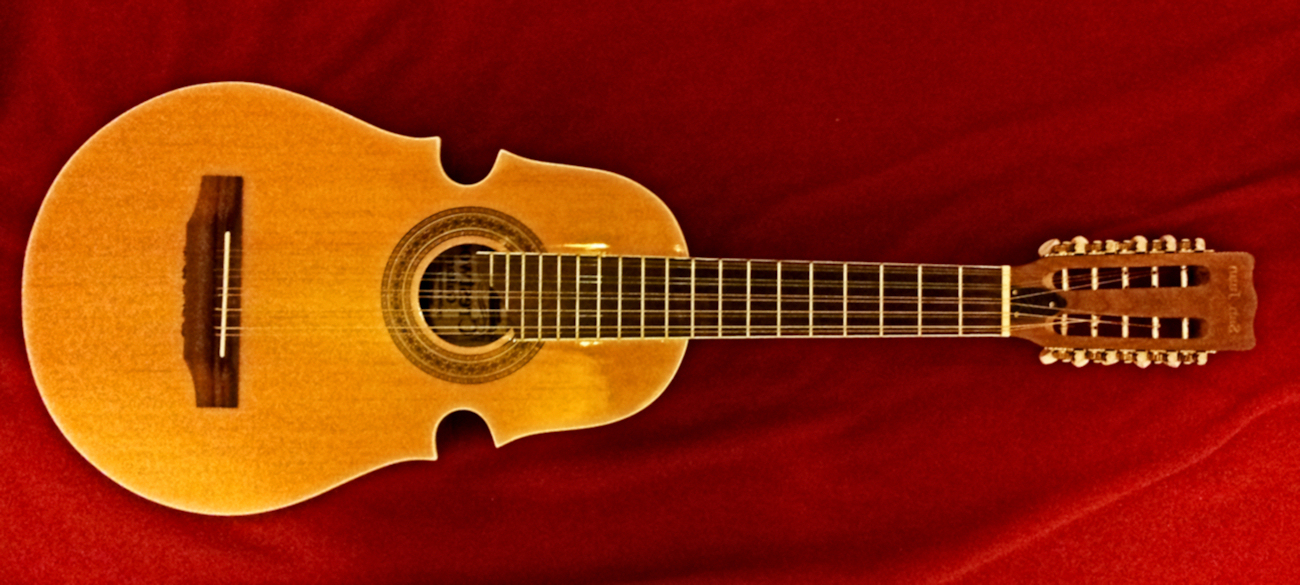
The Puerto Rican Cuatro, Carattini's musical instrument of choice

On one occasion Carattini heard a group called "La Tuna de Cayey" sing Puerto Rican Christmas songs and was very impressed. In Puerto Rico "Tunas" are a group of singers and musicians who sing Christmas related songs. One of the songs sung by Tuna de Cayey was "Estas Navidades van a ser Candela" (roughly, "This Christmas season will be a firestorm"), a composition by Herminio de Jesús Figueroa that became part of the Tuna de Cayey's LP production "Candela con la Tuna de Cayey". In 1964, Carattini spoke with a friend, Víctor Cotto, who was the director of another "Tuna" and asked him if he could join. Carattini became a member of Cotto's "Tuna Taurina de Cayey" and participated in the recording of La Fabulosa Tuna Taurina. He remained with the group until 1969.

In 1970, he quit his low paying teaching job and became an insurance salesman. He went on to create a new "Tuna" which included 23 members and with $3,000 recorded a "demo". After the recording, they decided that they as a group had a good chance of competing against the "Tunas" already established and adopted the name "Los Cantores de San Juan".

In January 1971, they recorded their first Christmas album, however they had to wait almost a year until the Christmas holidays at the end of the year to release it. Finally, the album was released and became a big hit after being played on the radio by the then DJ Alfred D. Herger. The album included Si no me dan de beber, lloro (If you don't give me a drink, I'll cry), Asomante a los cantores and Porque era Católico. The song has been interpreted by such singers as Danny Rivera and Marco Antonio Muñiz. Another song which became a Puerto Rican Christmas classic was Dame la Mano Paloma (Give me your Hand, Dove) in 1979.

From then on Carattini and Los Cantores de San Juan performed sold out functions during every Christmas season up to 2005. In 2005, Carattini made his last public appearance on Así es la Navidad, a Gilberto Santa Rosa production.

== Discography ==
External audio
- You may listen to Luciano Quiñones piano interpretation of Carattini's "Dame la mano Paloma" here
- and to Carattini and "Los Cantores" sing "El Amolao" on YouTube.

Among Carattini's recordings are the following:

- Si no me dan de beber, lloro – 1971
- El caracol – 1972
- Motivos navideños con... Los Cantores de San Juan – 1972
- Éxitos de siempre con Los Cantores de San Juan – 1972
- La puerca voladora – 1972
- De fiesta con Los Cantores de San Juan – 1973
- ¡Es más bueno...! – 1973
- Caminan las nubes / El patatú – 1974
- Idem – 1975
- Idem – 1977
- Dame la mano, paloma – 1979
- Éxitos de siempre con Los Cantores de San Juan, Vol. 2" 1979
- De rolimpín / Pidiendo posada – 1980
- ¡Se prendió la Navidad! – 1987 with Felito Félix
- Controversia – 1985 with Danny Rivera and Alpha IV
- Trullando con... Vicente Carattini, Chucho Avellanet y... Los Cantores −1986
- De trulla en trulla – 1988
- 25 años de Navidad – 1996

== Death ==
Carattini suffered from leukemia and died on November 7, 2005. Vicente Carattini is buried in the Jardín del Edén Cemetery in Cidra Puerto Rico. An elementary school in his hometown of Cidra was named in his honor.

== Legacy ==
The school is called Escuela Ernesto Vicente Carattin which is located at 782 km 6 2 Barrio Ceiba, in the town of Cidra.

== See also ==
- List of Puerto Ricans
- Corsican immigration to Puerto Rico
- List of Puerto Rican songwriters
- Music of Puerto Rico
