= Alci Acosta =

Colombian musician

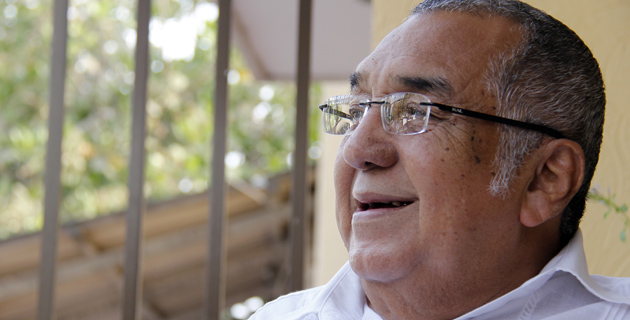

Background information
- Also known as: Alci Acosta
- Born: Alcibiades Alfonso Acosta Cervantes; 5 November 1938 (age 88); Soledad, Atlántico, Colombia
- Genres: bolero, pasillo, corrido, valse, ranchera
- Instruments: piano, vocals

Alci Acosta (born Alcibiades Alfonso Acosta Cervantes; 5 November 1938) is a Colombian bolero singer, pianist, and performer of Latin American music including pasillos, corridos, valses, and rancheras.

Acosta is a highly successful artist throughout Latin America having partnered with other notable artists such as Ecuadorian singer, Julio Jaramillo, who died in 1978.

Acosta's best-selling single to date is "Traicionera" which has sold over 1,300,000 copies across Latin America. Other notable hits are "La Cárcel De Sing Sing", "La Copa Rota", "Hola Soledad", "Tango Negro", "Señora Bonita", "El Preso Número 9", and "El Contragolpe".

Acosta has released numerous albums over his career including Tropicales Ilegales, 16 Éxitos De Oro, Mis Mejores Canciones, and Solo Hits (a compilation of hit singles).

Acosta is the father of singer, Checo Acosta (born on 14 June 1965).
