= El camino de la vida (song) =

Song
- Songwriter: Héctor Ochoa Cárdenas

"El camino de la vida" (translation: "The Road of Life") is a Colombian song written in 1986 by Héctor Ochoa Cárdenas. It was popularized by the recording of the song by Arboleda y Valencia.

After a public poll conducted in 1999, the song was chosen by the Academia Colombiana de Musica as the Colombian Song of the 20th century. It was also selected as the most beautiful song in 1991 in a national vote conducted by RCN Radio. Viva Music Colombia rated the song No. 3 on its list of the 100 most important Colombian songs of all time. In its list of the 50 best Colombian songs of all time, El Tiempo, Colombia's most widely circulated newspaper, ranked the version of the song by Arboleda y Valencia at No. 46.
