= Danny Rivera =

Puerto Rican singer (born 1945)

Danny Rivera (born 27 February 1945) is a Puerto Rican singer and songwriter born in San Juan whose career spans nearly 50 years. He is well known in Puerto Rico for his political activism. In 2008, Rivera acquired Dominican Republic citizenship. After 12 years of work, Danny Rivera and Nelson González in 2014 finished work putting new life into the classical bolero - in Spanish. Rivera and González Hit the Heart of the Latin American Song Book on Obsesión (release 25 March 2014)

== Musical career ==
Danny Rivera is often called “the national voice of Puerto Rico", but his passionate singing style is known in the Spanish-speaking world. In Latin America, he has been a familiar face on television since 1968. Over the course of fifty years, Rivera has recorded over seventy albums and is the only Puerto Rican to star at Carnegie Hall in four different decades (1979, 1989, 1999, 2010).

He was born of humble origins in one of the deepest Afro-Rican culture zones—Santurce, Puerto Rico, the home of many of the island's most popular musicians and now part of the modern metropolitan area of San Juan. Born on 27 February 1945 in the neighborhood of 23 Abajo, named for one of the stops on a now-defunct trolley line, his first experiences with singing were in the chorus of an evangelical church and in the bars of his neighborhood, and with the barriles (barrel drums) of the street-side bomba that is Puerto Rico’s strongest link to the era of plantation slavery.

He made his first professional impression as a big-band singer in 1968, in the Hotel San Juan with César Concepción’s orchestra, the finest of its day. Televised music festivals are important talent showcases in Latin America, and after Rivera was chosen as Revelation of the Year in the 1968 Popularity Festival, he became a familiar face in Puerto Rico through television appearances. With a repertoire that emphasized the bolero and looked to progressive song movements, he was an emblematic figure of the bohemia of the 1970s that based itself at the nightclub in Viejo San Juan called Ocho Puertas (Eight Doors).

After making his recording debut in 1968 ("Amor, Amor", with a group called The Clean Cuts), he began a string of hits that included "Porque yo te amo", "Fuiste mía un verano", "Manolo", "Mi viejo", "Yo y la rosa", and "Va cayendo una lágrima". In 1971 he had a superhit with a version of Roberto Carlos's "Jesucristo", followed up the next year with his album "Mi Hijo", which included two of his career-defining songs, "Tu pueblo es mi pueblo" and "Amada amante". For years after that, he recorded and concertized constantly, becoming an international star while maintaining a presence on Puerto Rican radio and TV.

He delved into the rich past of Puerto Rican music, something practically unheard of for Latin pop artists. He signed with the Venezuelan label TH in 1980, and his albums during this period are considered classics, including "Alborada", "Serenata" (with a song that became a standard of his, Don Felo's "Madrigal",) and "Danza para mi pueblo", an album of Puerto Rican danzas. He subsequently began his own label, DNA, producing among other titles "Así cantaba Cheíto González", volumes 1 and 2, and an album of Tito Rodríguez's ballads, "Inolvidable Tito". On 15 September 1987 he performed a successful duo concert with Michel Camilo at the Centro de Bellas Artes in San Juan, called "Danny regresa a Ocho Puertas" (Danny returns to Ocho Puertas)

As his work became increasingly socially, spiritually, and historically conscious, he continued recording and touring internationally, but found himself less in step with the Latin music industry. Still, in the late 1980s he signed with Sony Music and recorded the successful album "Amar o morir", as well as "Subiendo y bajando" with Gilberto Santa Rosa, but increasingly he devoted himself to his social projects.

== Social activity ==
Rivera made international news in the summer of 2001 when he spent thirty days in the US federal prison at Guaynabo, Puerto Rico, accused of civil disobedience in demonstrating for the withdrawal of the US Navy from the Puerto Rican island of Vieques. Later that year his prison diary and poems were published in the book Enamorado de la paz: Diario en la Cárcel Federal (In Love with Peace: A Diary at the Federal Prison).

His commitment to a style of song that expresses both personal and social love led him naturally to Cuba, where he has been a frequent visitor. In 2004 he inaugurated the Cátedra Internacional de Artes Plásticas y Música (International School of Plastic and Musical Arts) in Havana. In collaboration with the Cuban Artists and Writers Union (UNEAC), he made a documentary about Puerto Rican cultural traces in eastern Cuba, published in the book "Ecos Boricuas en el Oriente de Cuba". In 2008 he became a naturalized citizen of the Dominican Republic in recognition of his work with "Los Dajaos", a well known community located in the peaceful mountains of Jarabacoa, surrounded by rivers and pine trees in the Dominican Republic, a true paradise.

In 2009, Rivera sang "Madrigal", "Tu pueblo es mi pueblo", and "Amar o morir" before 1.2 million listeners in Havana (almost all of them wearing all white) at the Paz Sin Fronteras concert organized by Juanes; the concert was seen throughout the Western Hemisphere and in Europe by millions of television and online viewers, the biggest Latin music broadcast event ever.

In March 5, 2020, Danny Rivera was the featured singer on Norberto Vélez's YouTube channel titled "Sesiones Desde La Loma Ep. 6".

== Discography ==
- ""Amor, Amor"" Danny Rivera with The Clean Cuts (undated) Gema #LPG-3039
- ""Asi Es"" (1968)
- ""Cuando Me Miras Tu"" (1969)
- ""From Danny With Love"" (1970)
- ""Danny Rivera-Danny Rivera"" (1970) #LPVS-1437
- Mi Hijo (1971) #LPVS-1450
- ""Danny Rivera-Danny Rivera"" (1972) #LPVS-1461
- Danny Rivera Una Sencilla Cancion de Amor (1973) #LPV-1467
- Danny Rivera (1974) #LPVS-1481
- Eramos (1974) #LPVS-1418
- Danny Rivera en Concierto (1974) [2 LPs]
- Canciones de Amor (1975)
- Danny Rivera (1975) #LPVS-1504
- Danny Rivera y Alborada (1976)
- Temas de Películas (1976)
- Para Toda la Vida (1977)
- Danny Rivera (1977) #LPVS-1518
- La Tierra Mia..! (1977)
- Muy Amigos (1977)
- Serenata (1979)
- Muchachito (1979)
- Cada Vez, Otra Vez...Danny Rivera (1980) #TH-AM-2102
- Gitano (1981)
- No Hay Distancia (1981)
- Danza Para Mi Pueblo (1981)
- 15 Grandes Éxitos (1982)
- Por Amar Se Da Todo (1983) #TH-AMF 2229
- 16 Canciones de Amor (1983)
- Así Cantaba Cheito González (1984)
- Como Si El Amor No Importara (1984)
- Danny Rivera en la Intimidad...con Guitarras (1984)
- Pido Paz (1984)
- Controversia (1985)
- Así Cantaba Cheito González, Vol. 2 (1985)
- Inolvidable Tito, A Mi Me Pasa lo Mismo Que A Usted (1985)
- Ofrenda (1986)
- Amar o Morir (1987)
- Mi Canción Es Paz (1987)
- El Día Que Me Quieras (1988)
- Los Niños Jesús Del Mundo (1988)
- Romanza (1988)
- ""Que Tiene El"" (1989)
- 15 Éxitos (1990)
- Canto a la Humanidad (1990)
- Mosaico Vol. 1 (1990)
- 20 Éxitos (1991)
- Mosaico Vol. 2 (1999)
- Tiempo al Tiempo (1992)
- Brillantes (1994)
- Caras Del Amor (1994)
- Serie Platino (1994)
- Hágase La Luz (1995)
- Oro Romántico: 20 Grandes Éxitos (1996)
- Borinquen Vive (1997)
- Latin Stars Serie 15 Exitos (1997)
- Regalo De Amor y Paz (1999)
- En Vivo Desde El Carnegie Hall (1999)
- Quiere Nacer (2005)
- Mi Tierra Me Llama (2007)
- Enamorado de la Paz (2007)
- Corazón Jíbaro (2008)
- Viva Nuestra Tradición (2009)
- Renace en Navidad (2011)
- 20 Exitos Navideños (2011)

== Awards ==
The following is a list of Rivera's Grammy Awards nominations:

Year	Category	Nominated for	Result
1988	Best Latin Pop Album	Amar o Morir	Nominated
1987	Best Latin Pop Album	Inolvidable Tito... A Mi Me Pasa lo Mismo que a Usted	Nominated

== See also ==
- List of Puerto Ricans
