= Olimpo Cárdenas =

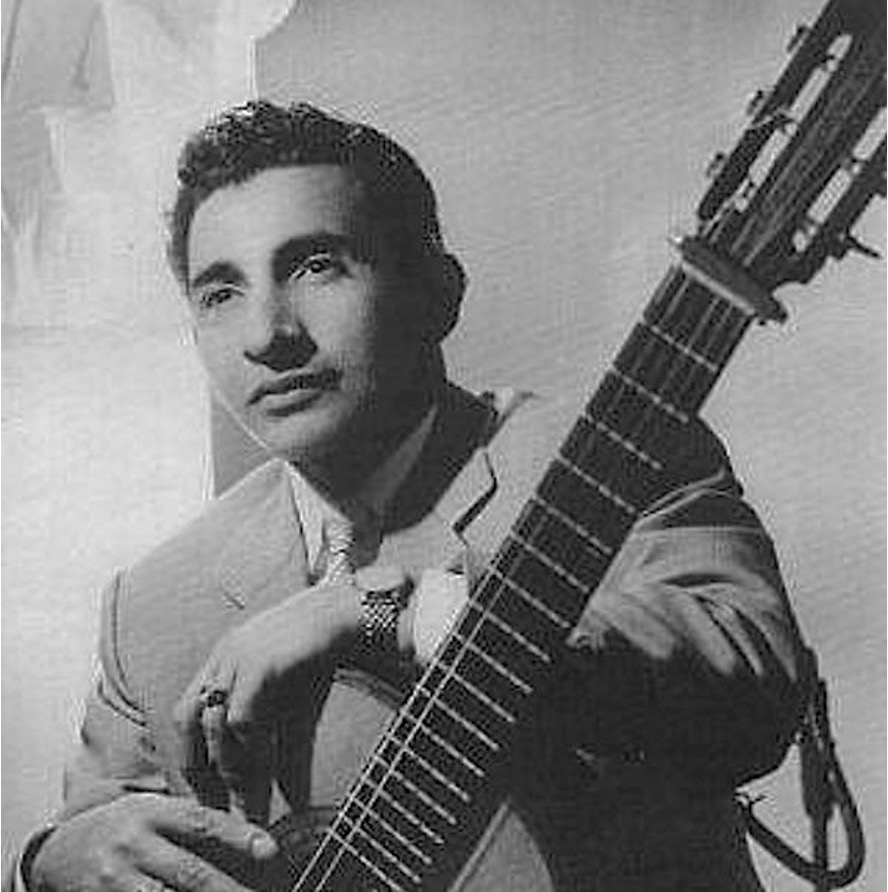

Background information
- Also known as: El Rey del Estilo; El Magaldi ecuatoriano
- Born: Olimpo León Cárdenas Moreira; July 5, 1923; Vinces, Ecuador
- Died: July 28, 1991 (aged 68) Tuluá, Colombia
- Genres: Bolero, vals, yaraví y Pasillo
- Occupation: Singer
- Instrument: Voice
- Years active: 1941 - 1991
- Labels: Ifesa; Discos Victoria; Sonolux; Discos Orfeón

Olimpo León Cárdenas Moreira (July 5, 1923 - July 28, 1991) was an Ecuadorian singer.

== Career ==
He toured extensively throughout Colombia, performing in towns that had never previously hosted a concert. He's remembered as a renowned singer who performed boleros at a public concert in Villavicencio in 1959.
