= Canelita Medina =

Venezuelan musician (1939–2023)

- Also known as: The Caribbean Sonera, The Sonera of Venezuela
- Born: Rogelia Medina Romero; 6 March 1939
- Origin: La Guaira, Venezuela
- Died: 4 July 2023 (aged 84)
- Genres: Salsa, Guaracha, Cuban son, Guajira
- Occupation: Musician
- Instrument: Voice
- Years active: 1957–2023
- Formerly of: Sonero Clásico del Caribe, Federico y Su Combo Latino, Tito Puente, Oscar D'León, Celia Cruz, Trina Medina, Andy Durán, Tito Rodriguez, Johnny Pacheco, Richy Ray

Canelita Medina (born Rogelia Medina Romero, 6 March 1939 – 4 July 2023) was a Venezuelan salsa singer noted for singing in the Cuban Son style. She had always dreamt of becoming a singer as a young girl, imitating the salsa singer Celia Cruz. When she entered a radio talent program on Radio Continente, she caught the attention of talent agents with her unique voice. Over the years, Canelita has achieved great success, both nationally and internationally, and is successful to this day. Through more than 50 years of her life as an artist, Canelita Medina has received many awards.

Her daughter, Trina Medina, has also had a notable career in music as a soloist and music writer for the 2007 Venezuelan film, Una abuela virgen. In The Book of Salsa, Rondón states, "it is impossible to overlook the contributions of Canelita and her daughter, Trina Medina, each with her own distinct, yet connected style."

== Biography ==
Canelita Medina, whose real name is Rogelia Medina, was born in the port of La Guaira on 6 March 1939, and is seen as one of the greatest symbols of the "Son Montuno." She is a source of national pride for Venezuela and their 'living legend,' recently celebrating fifty years of life as an artist with a CD collection. She is considered one of the most versatile voices in Venezuela to sing music such as Son, the Guajira, the rhythmic Montuno and Bolero. She demonstrated an aptitude for singing since childhood. Her musical career began on a professional level in 1957 with the act "Sonora Caracas," with whom she remained for seven years and made her first recording "Canelita." She also joined "Los megatones de Lucho" and "Los Caribes" by Victor Piñero, after her performance alongside the "Estrellas Latinas" of La Guaira. Canelita took a break from the performances for a period of eight years, until joining Federico Betancourt in "Federico y su Combo Latino" and recording her first hit, "Besos brujos." She was the unique singer woman in the orchestra along with El Negrito Calavén, Carlín Rodríguez, El Bobby, Joe Ruiz, Orlando Watussi, Wladimir Lozano, Dimas Pedroza, Manny Bolaños and others. However, her talent became well known after she decided to go solo, recording the legendary album Sones y Guajira, a classic of Venezuelan discography. The album included "Rosa roja," "Yo no escondo a mi abuelita" and "Eso no es ná," among others. She then recorded albums which highlight her great success, such as Quiéreme, Noche triunfal and Canto a La Guairá, among others, until she became involved with El Sonero Clásico del Caribe, with whom she recorded two albums, from which two songs "Tanto y tanto" and "Ta ta Candela" became international hits.

After several years, Canelita formed her own group, with whom she performed many times. The popular Venezuelan singer alternated concerts among internationally recognised performers with various groups such as Orquesta América, La Aragón, Sonora Matancera, El Gran Combo de Puerto Rico, Los Hermanos Lebrón, Estrellas de Fania, Richy Ray and Bobby Cruz, Sonora Ponceña, Johnny Pacheco, Celia Cruz, Oscar D'León and José Mangual Jr. She performed solo in many Venezuelan cities, as well as in various different countries, including Peru, Colombia, Costa Rica, Curaçao, Aruba, United States, Mexico and Cuba.

Medina attended many festivals as a special guest, in particular the International Salsa Festival held in the Teatro Teresa Carreño, and the Benny Moré Festival and the Son Festival, held in Santiago, Cuba and Curaçao, respectively. In recent years she has worked with Andy Durán in countless presentations at national and international levels, and in various concerts at the UCV Aula Magna, paying homage to the greats of Latin music La noche de Los Titos (Tito Rodriguez and Tito Puente), Fania All-Stars and Celia Cruz, from which she released the live album Canelita and Andy Duran's tribute concert for Celia Cruz.

Medina was also a special guest at the Oscar D'Leon concert held in the Aula Magna UCV, celebrating 50 years with the Orquesta Sinfónica Municipal de Caracas, as well as at a tribute to Alfredo Sadel held in the Las Mercedes Square performed by the Orquesta Sinfónica Gran Mariscal de Ayacucho.

Medina died on 4 July 2023, at the age of 84.

== Latest album ==
In 2008, she received the Orden Carlos Soublette recognition award from the Vargas state government. She then produced a CD collection including "Besos brujos," "El que se va no hace falta," "Tanto y tanto," "Quiéreme," "Besos salvajes," "Yo no escondo a mi abuelita," "El cangrejo no tiene ná," "La ruñidera," "Soy Canela," "El son de mi nación," "Rosas rojas," "La alborada," "Una noche de Francia" and "Coco Seco."

== Discography ==
Canelita made a total of 26 albums, the most popular of which are listed below.

Publication year	Títle	Record label
196?	Combo Iris	Discomoda
196?	La Bruja / La Sonora Caracas	Discomoda
1969	Besame Negro / Pedro J. Belisario Orquesta	Philips
1971	Soroso / Las Estrellas Latinas	Pyraphon Records
1974	Las Estrellas Latinas	Suramericana Del Disco
1976	Ayer y Hoy / Federico y su Combo	Basf
1977	Mis Exitos y Mas / Federico y su Combo	Basf
1977	Sabor / Federico y su Combo	Foca Records
1978	Federico y Su Combo 78	Foca Records
1979	El Maestro / Federico y su Orquesta	Fonobosa
1979	Sones y Guajiras	Foca Records
1980	Sonero Clásico del Caribe	Foca Records
1980	Sonero Clásico del Caribe & Canelita	Foca Records
1980	Trae Candela	Foca Records
1981	Canelita	Foca Records
1982	Son... A mi manera	CBS
1983	Yo soy el son	CBS
1984	Lo que siento	CBS records
1986	La experiencia y el Futuro / Naty y su Orquesta	Combo Records
1988	Bailable y con clase	Foca records
1989	Imagen Latina / El Trabuco Venezolano	Producciones Leon
1995	Canelita	Recopilatorio	Foca records
1996	Ayer y Hoy	Recopilatorio	Foca records
2004	Canelita y Andy Durán en concierto Tributo a Celia	Obeso-pacanins
2005	Sones y Guajiras	Recopilatorio	Foca records
2006	Salsa dura Descarga a Tribute To Fania	Latin Town Music
2006	Trina Medina En Vivo	TM Producciones
2009	Canelita Medina en vivo ...50 años de vida artistica	TM Producciones
