= El Bestial Sonido de Ricardo Ray y Bobby Cruz =

Studio album by Richie Ray & Bobby Cruz
- Released: 1971
- Recorded: Ochoa Recording, San Juan, Puerto Rico
- Genre: Salsa music

El Bestial Sonido de Ricardo Ray y Bobby Cruz (The Bestial Sound of Ricardo Ray and Bobby Cruz) is the thirteenth studio album released in 1971 by the salsa music duet Richie Ray & Bobby Cruz. Released at the height of their popularity, the album inaugurated a new era in salsa with the inauguration of a new Fania Records subsidiary: Vaya Records. The album, notable for the inclusion of new elements into salsa such as classical music, was an international success, and its title track Sonido Bestial became one of salsa's most popular songs. The album consecrated Richie Ray as a prodigious pianist, capable of playing a fusion of several rhythms and styles.

== Critical reception ==
Critic José A. Estévez, Jr. named the album "a staggering, spellbinding salsa experience" and "an absolute must-have." He also stated that the title track Sonido Bestial "remains one of the most remarkable (and recognizable) tunes of the salsa era". Jaime Torres Torres praised Bobby Cruz vocal performance.

Professional ratings
Review scores
Source	Rating
Allmusic	4.5/5 stars

== Track listing ==
No.	Title	Writer(s)	Length
1.	"Sonido Bestial"	R. Ray - B. Cruz	6:45
2.	"Señora"	Joan Manuel Serrat	3:35
3.	"No Tin Pena"	Rivero	5:22
4.	"La Vimari"	R. Ray - B. Cruz	5:15
5.	"Guaguancó Triste"	Rubén Blades	5:20
6.	"Fire and Rain"	James Taylor	4:34
7.	"Cha Cha Huele Changó"	Rosario	4:30
8.	"Volver"	Carlos Gardel/Alfredo Le Pera	4:42

== Personnel ==
- Ricardo Ray: piano, backing vocals and arrangements
- Bobby Cruz: lead and backing vocals, and arrangements
- Miki Vimari: lead and backing vocals
- Ismael “Cocolía” Rodríguez: first trumpet
- Ismael “Maelo” Rodríguez: second trumpet
- Manolito González: bongó, cencerro and timbalitos
- José “Mañengue” Hidalgo: congas
- Charlie “El Pirata” Cotto: timbales
- Mike “El Che” Amitin: bass guitar
- Johnny Pacheco: recording director
- Pedrito: engineer
- Fred Weinberg: sound mix
- Maurice Seymour: cover photograph
- Izzy Sanabria: cover design
