= Jala Jala Boogaloo Volume II =

Studio album by Richie Ray & Bobby Cruz
- Released: 1968
- Genre: Salsa Music, Boogaloo
- Label: Alegre
- Producer: Pancho Cristal

Richie Ray & Bobby Cruz chronology
Jala Jala y Boogaloo (1967)	Jala Jala Boogaloo Volume II (1968)

Professional ratings
Review scores
Source	Rating
AllMusic	4.5/5 stars

Jala Jala Boogaloo Volume II is an album released by the salsa music duet Richie Ray & Bobby Cruz. Released in 1968, the album continues with the sound of its predecessor Jala Jala y Boogaloo, influenced by Latin rhythms such as the Puerto Rican Jala Jala, as well as by soul and Beat music.

Backed by the hit song "Mr. Trumpet Man", the album was an international success, being popular in the United States, Colombia, Puerto Rico and other countries. The album's success enabled the duet to sign a contract with West Side Latino records, and leave Alegre Records.

== Background ==
With their previous albums, Richie Ray & Bobby Cruz had established themselves as prominent artists in the New York City music scene of the 1960s. Releasing Jala Jala y Boogaloo in 1967, the group achieved international success with hit songs such as Richie's Jala Jala. Following the success of that album, the group returned to the studio with producer Pancho Cristal to continue that formula.

== Track listing ==
No.	Title	Length
1.	"Tin Marín"	4:29
2.	"Música Ye Ye"	3:29
3.	"Aquel Día"	5:05
4.	"Mr. Trumpet Man"	5:07
5.	"Iqui Con Iqui"	7:00
6.	"More Richie"	4:27
7.	"Que Se Rían"	4:00
8.	"Las Caraqueñas"	2:53

== Credits ==
- Ricardo Ray – piano
- Bobby Cruz – vocals
- Pedro Chaparro – trumpet
- Adolphus Doc Cheatham – trumpet
- Russell S. Farnsworth – bass guitar
- Cándido Rodríguez – Timbales
- Harry Rodríguez – bongos
- Joaquín Dillonis – congas
