= I Like It (Cardi B, Bad Bunny and J Balvin song) =

2018 single by Cardi B, Bad Bunny and J Balvin

Single by Cardi B, Bad Bunny, and J Balvin

from the album Invasion of Privacy
- Language: English; Spanish
- Released: May 25, 2018
- Recorded: 2017–2018
- Genre: Latin trap; hip hop
- Length: 4:13
- Label: Atlantic
- Songwriters: Belcalis Almánzar; Benito Martínez; José Osorio; Tony Pabón; Marcos Masis; Jesus Nieves; Manny Rodriguez; Jorden Thorpe; Anthony White; Vincent Watson; Edgar Machuca; Xavier Vargas; Edgar Vargas; Benny Bonnilla
- Producers: J. White Did It; Tainy; Craig Kallman; Invincible

Cardi B singles chronology
| "Dinero" (2018) | "I Like It" (2018) | "Girls Like You" (2018) |

J Balvin singles chronology
| "Estan Pa' Mí" (2018) | "I Like It" (2018) | "Karma" (2018) |

Bad Bunny singles chronology
| "Dura (Remix)" (2018) | "I Like It" (2018) | "Te Descuidó" (2018) |

Music video
- "I Like It" on YouTube

"I Like It" is a song by American rapper Cardi B, Puerto Rican rapper Bad Bunny and Colombian singer J Balvin. It was released on May 25, 2018, to radio stations through Atlantic Records as the fourth single from her debut studio album, Invasion of Privacy (2018). "I Like It" is a Latin trap and hip hop song that comprises a trap drum beat and boogaloo music. It was written by the three performers along with Pardison Fontaine and Klenord Raphael, while the production was handled by J. White Did It, Tainy, Craig Kallman and Invincible. The song contains a sample from "I Like It Like That", with Tony Pabón, Manny Rodriguez, and Benny Bonnilla being credited as co-writers.

Work on the song took from October 2017 to early April 2018. Its music video was filmed in Little Havana, Miami and has received more than 1.7 billion views. The single topped the US Billboard Hot 100, becoming Cardi B's second number one—the first time a female rapper achieved this in the chart's history, and the first for both Bad Bunny and J Balvin. It also reached the top 10 in Canada, Ireland, New Zealand, Portugal, Slovakia, Spain, Switzerland, and the United Kingdom. Critically acclaimed, Billboard staff, Los Angeles Times, and Apple Music's editorial selection ranked it as the best song of the year, while Rolling Stone named it the 11th-best summer song of all time.

"I Like It" was nominated for Record of the Year at the 61st Annual Grammy Awards. The song was certified Diamond by the Recording Industry Association of America (RIAA) in 2021 for selling more than 10 million units, becoming the second song from the album to receive this certification, following "Bodak Yellow", thus extending Cardi B's record as the female rapper with the most Diamond-certified songs, as her third, and earning her a Guinness World Record for a tie for the most among female artists. It became the first female rap song to surpass a billion streams on Spotify, also making Cardi B the first woman in hip hop with a pair of billion-streamers on the service, joining her collaboration "Girls Like You". As of 2021, it is the most-streamed song by a female rapper in the UK. Rolling Stone ranked it on the 500 Greatest Songs of All Time at number 384.

== Background ==
We must have gone through so many different version of the mix. We mixed this over and over and over again. We wanted to make sure the low end was right and the clarity was right and the mid range was right, and it had real dynamic range and great stereo separation with the vocals just sitting right in the pocket. After the truly thousandth listen, I'm like, "This really works. There's nothing more we can do to this to make it better".

— Kallman in an interview with Billboard.

During the recording sessions of Invasion of Privacy, Cardi and her team were listening to beats and song ideas. Craig Kallman proposed to include a track that pays homage to her Latin heritage and searched among his Latin music collection of records that he used to play when he was a DJ. Decided for Pete Rodriguez's "I Like It Like That" and "Oh That's Nice", he added J. White to the production process. The sample of the former song "over a very rough instrumental" and with a Cardi verse on it was sent to musician Edgar Machuca. White and Machuca worked on the production, chopping up the sample and trying to "make the song sound better and cohesive and beef up the production." Cardi re-wrote the hook a number of times and cut vocals, eventually choosing the chorus she was most comfortable with. The three producers looped the "I Like It" part as they felt that was the catchiest part of the sample. Machuca proposed adding Bad Bunny and J Balvin to the track, with both artists contributing with their verses and ideas. Tainy and Invincible finished working on the production focusing on the instrumentals. Work on the record started in October 2017, and finished in early April 2018.

== Production ==
"I Like It" is a Latin trap and hip hop song. It is a blend of trap and salsa, and interpolates 1967 boogaloo song "I Like It Like That". According to mixing engineer Leslie Braithwaite, who worked on the whole album, Atlantic Records hired musicians to replay all elements of the sampled portion. This meant that the publishers for "I Like It" retained full rights to Cardi's version of the song and Atlantic Records only had to clear songwriting rights for the original composition "I Like It Like That". As noted by a Billboard editor, the song is "heavily indebted to the world of Latin hip hop." Bad Bunny and J Balvin perform in Spanish and English.

== Critical reception ==
"I Like It" received critical acclaim. Writing for Rolling Stone, Brittany Spanos deemed it "the song of the summer" and commented "[it] sounds like it was chemically concocted in a mad scientist's lab to be 2018's reigning song of the summer. [...] Everything about this song is perfect for summer: the trap-meets-salsa beat, features from two of reggaeton's biggest stars, a sample of Pete Rodriguez's half-century-old boogaloo hit 'I Like It Like That'." In The Atlantic, Hannah Giorgis also deemed it "song of the summer" considering "[the song] is irresistible because it channels the rapper at her best: when she feels at home." She also noted that the verses from both Bad Bunny and J Balvin "match Cardi's energy" and "add complementary dynamism to the track." Neil Z. Yeung of AllMusic considered it a "notable highlight" of the album. At the end of the year, Entertainment Weekly opined, "[the song] will be on summer rotation long past 2018." Rolling Stone staff ranked "I Like It" among the best songs of the 2010s, deeming it Cardi's "hugely expansive vision of hip-hop as a multicultural, worldwide block party."

=== Accolades ===
Critics' lists
| Publication | List | Rank | Ref. |
|---|---|---|---|
| Los Angeles Times | Best of 2018 | 1 | |
| Apple Music | 2018's Song of the Year (Editorial Selection) | 1 | |
| Billboard | 100 Best Songs of 2018 | 1 | |
| Consequence of Sound | Top 50 Songs of 2018 | 4 | |
| Entertainment Weekly | The 10 Best Songs of 2018 | 5 | |
| Rolling Stone | 50 Best Songs of 2018 | 3 | |
| Rolling Stone | The 100 Best Songs of the 2010s | 9 | |
| Rolling Stone | Best Summer Songs of All Time | 11 | |
| Rolling Stone | 500 Greatest Songs of All Time (Note: industry-voted 2021 list) | 384 | |
| NPR | Best Music of 2018 | 8 | |
| The Guardian | The Top 100 Songs of 2018 | 9 | |
| The New York Times | The 65 Best Songs of 2018 (Jon Caramanica) | 1 (Note: tied with "Estamos Bien", "Mia" and "Te Boté (Remix)") | |
| The New York Times | The 65 Best Songs of 2018 (Jon Pareles) | 10 | |
| Stereogum | The 200 Best Songs of the 2010s | 40 | |

== Commercial performance ==
Prior to its release as a single, the song debuted at number eight on the US Billboard Hot 100, becoming Cardi B's fifth top-ten entry on the chart and the highest debut of the songs from the album, which all debuted on the Hot 100 during the album's first week of release. Bad Bunny and J Balvin earned their first and second top 10s, respectively. Following the release of the single's accompanying music video, the song rose to a new peak of number seven on the chart, For the chart issue dated June 16, with "I Like It" and "Girls Like You", her collaboration with Maroon 5 charting at number four, Cardi B scored two concurrent Hot 100 top-five singles for the second time in 2018. It ascended to number two the next week, blocked from the top by XXXTentacion's "Sad!". It reached number one in its twelfth week, earning Cardi her second chart-topper, thus making her the first female rapper in history to do so. Bad Bunny and J Balvin scored their first number one. She also became the first female soloist to reach number one with two songs from a debut album since Lady Gaga, who did it in 2009. "I Like It" reached number one on Digital Songs in its 20th chart week, claiming the sixth-longest wait to the summit since the chart began in 2004. It also became Cardi B's second number one song on the Radio Songs chart. Internationally, the single also charted within the top 10 in Canada, Ireland, New Zealand, Portugal, Slovakia, Spain, Switzerland and the United Kingdom. In the United States, "I Like It" reigned in the charts for 51 weeks, which made Cardi B the first female rapper to have a song chart that long.

"I Like It" became the first Latin trap song to top the Hot 100. Editor Leila Cobo for Billboard explained its notability, "it's part of an accelerated spike of Spanish and Spanish-infused songs on the chart [...] This surge can be attributed at least in part to streaming, which has broadened the scope for Latin music that is still shunned from major mainstream outlets. But it also reflects the times, the moment and the new openness of the world, despite the entrenchment at the border."

"I Like It" also became the first number one single—and the first Latin trap song in this genre to do so—on the Billboard Dance/Mix Show Airplay chart for Cardi B, Bad Bunny, and J Balvin, reaching that summit in its September 1, 2018 issue, benefitting from the support from both the 80 reporting stations (dual Top 40/CHR and Rhythmic outlets who submit their mix show hours or incorporate it in their playlist) and the core full-time Dance/EDM stations, the latter utilizing the remixed Dance versions of the song. It was Billboard's top song of the year by a female artist on both Hot Rap Songs and Hot R&B/Hip-Hop Songs.

"I Like It" was 2018's most streamed song by a female artist on Apple Music globally, and sixth overall. It was also the year's most streamed song by a female artist in Canada, and sixth among all artists.

== Music video ==
The director wanted Cardi B's location to showcase a "neighborhood feel," J Balvin (bottom left) a "club scene" with a live band and Bad Bunny (bottom right) "the street hood feel". Pictured atop, a screenshot of a "hero shot" from Cardi.

The song's accompanying music video was directed by Eif Rivera and filmed during the week of March 27, 2018 in Little Havana, Miami. A preview of the clip was featured on YouTube Music's announcement video on May 23. Released on May 29, 2018, the music video opens with Cardi B in a neighborhood, followed by scenes of Bad Bunny in the streets and J Balvin in a club. It also features scenes of the trio performing together.

Director Eif Rivera stated in an interview that he was inspired by the movie I Like It Like That (1994), which opening scene centered in a neighborhood of the South Bronx. People en Español stated that the video "transports" the viewer "to be part of scenes and traditions worthy of a tropical afternoon." The magazine and Vibe noted Cardi B's garments and "traditional rumba clothing accessories" inspired by Celia Cruz.

"I Like It" topped YouTube's 2018 Songs of the Summer list in the United States, and ranked fifth globally. As of March 2026, it has received over 1.7 billion views.

== Live performances ==
Cardi B, Bad Bunny and J Balvin gave the first live performance of "I Like It" at the 2018 Coachella Music Festival during its second weekend, on April 22. The trio delivered the first televised performance of the song at the 2018 American Music Awards. Featuring colorful outfits and visuals, they were accompanied by a live band composed by trumpet and bongo players. Cardi started the performance by lying atop a rotating circular stage; she then ripped off the voluminous tulle and performed a salsa dance. Bad Bunny was wheeled in for his verse in a grocery cart, while J Balvin joined hanging by the DJ booth. The Billboard article reviewing the ceremony named it the best performance of the night.

Bad Bunny performed the song with Shakira during the Super Bowl LIV halftime show.

J Balvin and Ryan Castro performed a portion of the song during Mexico's opening ceremony in the 2026 FIFA World Cup.

== Impact ==
Julyssa Lopez of Remezcla opined that "I Like It" leading the American charts "helps buttress the position of Spanish-language music in the Anglo and international pop spheres—and signals that [2017]'s moments en español could have more staying power" as it "adds another moment of renewed visibility for Latino artists and bilingual music." Stereogum staff also noticed that it "continued to firm up a lane for Spanish language in the American pop mainstream." In 2019, Vulture writer Gary Suarez stated that "I Like It" marked the introduction to a mainstream, massive audience of "a musical movement otherwise unknown to their ears", "transformed" Bad Bunny into "a household name" and "set the stage" for his full-length debut X 100pre. El Mundo newspaper also opined that the song made him connect with an international Gen Z audience. Similarly, Gary Suarez for the Forbes website said that the song "essentially introduced Latin trap to the masses." In Slate, Chris Molanphy considered that the artists produced "a different and more interesting animal" than previous Latin-influenced chart-toppers in the Anglo-market, and deemed it "a Trojan Horse distinct from any of the crossover records either of the 2017–18 wave or of the Latin Boom 1.0. in 1999." Pitchfork cited it among the songs that made Urbano music reach "critical mass".

== Awards and nominations ==
| Year | Ceremony | Category | Result | Ref. |
|---|---|---|---|---|
| 2018 | iHeartRadio Much Music Video Awards | Song of the Summer | Nominated | |
| 2018 | MTV Video Music Awards | Song of Summer | Won | |
| 2018 | BET Hip Hop Awards | Best Hip-Hop Video | Nominated | |
| 2018 | BET Hip Hop Awards | Best Collabo, Duo or Group | Nominated | |
| 2018 | BET Hip Hop Awards | Single of the Year | Nominated | |
| 2018 | Soul Train Music Awards | Rhythm & Bars Award | Nominated | |
| 2018 | E! People's Choice Awards | Song of 2018 | Nominated | |
| 2018 | Norwegian GAFFA Awards | Best Foreign Song | Nominated | |
| 2019 | Swedish GAFFA Awards | Best Foreign Song | Nominated | |
| 2019 | Grammy Awards | Record of the Year | Nominated | |
| 2019 | Premios Lo Nuestro | Crossover Collaboration of the Year | Nominated | |
| 2019 | iHeartRadio Music Awards | Best Collaboration | Nominated | |
| 2019 | iHeartRadio Music Awards | Hip Hop Song of The Year | Nominated | |
| 2019 | iHeartRadio Music Awards | Best Music Video | Nominated | |
| 2019 | Telemundo's Tu Música Urban Awards | International Artist Song | Nominated | |
| 2019 | Telemundo's Tu Música Urban Awards | International Artist Video | Nominated | |
| 2019 | Nickelodeon Kids' Choice Awards | Favorite Collaboration | Nominated | |
| 2019 | iHeartRadio Titanium Awards | Winning Song | Won | |
| 2019 | El Premio ASCAP | Song of the Year | Won | |
| 2019 | ASCAP Pop Music Awards | Winning Song | Won | |
| 2019 | Billboard Music Awards | Top Rap Song | Won | |
| 2019 | Billboard Music Awards | Top Hot 100 Song | Nominated | |
| 2019 | Billboard Music Awards | Top Streaming Song (Audio) | Nominated | |
| 2019 | Billboard Music Awards | Top Collaboration | Nominated | |
| 2019 | Billboard Music Awards | Top Selling Song | Nominated | |
| 2019 | BMI Pop Awards | Winning Song | Won | |
| 2019 | BET Awards | Best Collaboration | Nominated | |
| 2019 | BET Awards | Coca-Cola Viewers' Choice Award | Nominated | |
| 2019 | MTV Millennial Awards | Global Hit | Nominated | |
| 2019 | MTV Millennial Awards Brazil | Global Hit | Nominated | |
| 2019 | ASCAP Rhythm & Soul Music Awards | Winning Song | Won | |
| 2019 | BMI R&B/Hip-Hop Awards | Winning Song | Won | |

== Track listing ==
- Digital download – Dillon Francis remix
1. "I Like It" (Dillon Francis remix) – 3:39
- Digital download – German remix
1. "I Like It" (featuring Kontra K and AK Ausserkontrolle) – 4:14
- 12-inch single
1. "I Like It" – 4:13
2. "I Like It" (instrumental) – 4:13
3. "I Like It" (Dillon Francis remix) – 3:39
4. "I Like It" (radio edit) – 4:11

== Credits and personnel ==
Credits adapted from Tidal.

- Cardi B – vocals
- Bad Bunny – vocals
- J Balvin – vocals
- J. White Did It – producer
- Tainy – producer
- Craig Kallman – producer
- Evan LaRay – recording engineer
- Simone Torres – recording engineer
- Invincible – co-producer
- Nick Seeley – additional producer
- Colin Leonard – mastering engineer
- Juan Chaves – trumpet
- Michael Romero – background vocals
- Sarah Sellers – background vocals
- Nick Seeley – background vocals
- Andrew Tinker – background vocals
- Holly Seeley – background vocals
- Leslie Brathwaite – mixer

== Charts ==
=== Weekly charts ===
| Chart (2018–2019) | Peak position |
|---|---|
| Argentina (Argentina Hot 100) | 40 |
| Australia (ARIA) | 14 |
| Austria (Ö3 Austria Top 40) | 14 |
| Belgium (Ultratop 50 Flanders) | 19 |
| Belgium (Ultratop 50 Wallonia) | 21 |
| Canada Hot 100 (Billboard) | 2 |
| Canada CHR/Top 40 (Billboard) | 3 |
| Canada Hot AC (Billboard) | 30 |
| Colombia (Monitor Latino) | 19 |
| Colombia (National-Report) | 19 |
| Czech Republic Singles Digital (ČNS IFPI) | 11 |
| Denmark (Tracklisten) | 16 |
| Dominican Republic (SODINPRO) | 2 |
| Euro Digital Songs (Billboard) | 7 |
| France (SNEP) | 19 |
| Germany (GfK) | 14 |
| Greece International Digital (IFPI Greece) | 1 |
| Hungary (Dance Top 40) | 9 |
| Hungary (Single Top 40) | 12 |
| Hungary (Stream Top 40) | 10 |
| Iceland (Tónlistinn) | 12 |
| Ireland (IRMA) | 10 |
| Israel (Media Forest) | 1 |
| Italy (FIMI) | 24 |
| Mexico (Billboard Ingles Airplay) | 3 |
| Netherlands (Dutch Top 40) | 20 |
| Netherlands (Single Top 100) | 30 |
| New Zealand (Recorded Music NZ) | 7 |
| Norway (VG-lista) | 20 |
| Peru (Monitor Latino) | 12 |
| Poland Airplay (ZPAV) | 50 |
| Portugal (AFP) | 9 |
| Romania (Airplay 100) | 15 |
| Scotland Singles (OCC) | 13 |
| Singapore (RIAS) | 29 |
| Slovakia Airplay (ČNS IFPI) | 99 |
| Slovakia Singles Digital (ČNS IFPI) | 7 |
| Spain (Promusicae) | 10 |
| Sweden (Sverigetopplistan) | 24 |
| Switzerland (Schweizer Hitparade) | 8 |
| UK Singles (OCC) | 8 |
| UK Hip Hop/R&B (OCC) | 3 |
| US Billboard Hot 100 | 1 |
| US Adult Pop Airplay (Billboard) | 34 |
| US Dance Club Songs (Billboard) | 22 |
| US Dance/Mix Show Airplay (Billboard) | 1 |
| US Latin Airplay (Billboard) | 7 |
| US Hot R&B/Hip-Hop Songs (Billboard) | 1 |
| US R&B/Hip-Hop Airplay (Billboard) | 3 |
| US Pop Airplay (Billboard) | 3 |
| US Rhythmic Airplay (Billboard) | 1 |
| US Rolling Stone Top 100 | 96 |

| Chart (2026) | Peak position |
|---|---|
| Global 200 (Billboard) | 87 |

=== Year-end charts ===
| Chart (2018) | Position |
|---|---|
| Australia (ARIA) | 36 |
| Austria (Ö3 Austria Top 40) | 24 |
| Belgium (Ultratop Flanders) | 51 |
| Belgium (Ultratop Wallonia) | 64 |
| Canada (Canadian Hot 100) | 10 |
| Colombia (Monitor Latino) | 62 |
| Costa Rica (Monitor Latino) | 76 |
| Denmark (Tracklisten) | 53 |
| Dominican Republic (Monitor Latino) | 36 |
| El Salvador (Monitor Latino) | 43 |
| Estonia (IFPI) | 30 |
| France (SNEP) | 55 |
| Germany (Official German Charts) | 40 |
| Honduras (Monitor Latino) | 51 |
| Hungary (Dance Top 40) | 54 |
| Hungary (Single Top 40) | 74 |
| Hungary (Stream Top 40) | 29 |
| Iceland (Plötutíóindi) | 19 |
| Ireland (IRMA) | 31 |
| Italy (FIMI) | 59 |
| Netherlands (Single Top 100) | 74 |
| New Zealand (Recorded Music NZ) | 23 |
| Panama (Monitor Latino) | 90 |
| Paraguay (Monitor Latino) | 36 |
| Peru (Monitor Latino) | 69 |
| Portugal (AFP) | 20 |
| Romania (Airplay 100) | 83 |
| Spain (PROMUSICAE) | 18 |
| Sweden (Sverigetopplistan) | 73 |
| Switzerland (Schweizer Hitparade) | 21 |
| UK Singles (Official Charts Company) | 23 |
| US Billboard Hot 100 | 7 |
| US Dance/Mix Show Airplay Songs (Billboard) | 18 |
| US Hot R&B/Hip-Hop Songs (Billboard) | 2 |
| US Latin Airplay (Billboard) | 22 |
| US Mainstream Top 40 (Billboard) | 21 |
| US Rhythmic (Billboard) | 2 |
| Chart (2019) | Position |
| Canada (Canadian Hot 100) | 79 |
| Hungary (Dance Top 40) | 42 |
| Peru (Monitor Latino) | 100 |
| US Billboard Hot 100 | 69 |
| US Rolling Stone Top 100 | 63 |

=== Decade-end charts ===
| Chart (2010–2019) | Position |
|---|---|
| US Billboard Hot 100 | 56 |
| US Hot R&B/Hip-Hop Songs (Billboard) | 33 |

== Certifications ==
| Region | Certification | Certified units/sales |
|---|---|---|
| Argentina (CAPIF) | Gold | |
| Australia (ARIA) | 8× Platinum | 560,000^{‡} |
| Austria (IFPI Austria) | Platinum | 30,000^{‡} |
| Belgium (BRMA) | Gold | 20,000^{‡} |
| Canada (Music Canada) | Diamond | 800,000^{‡} |
| Denmark (IFPI Danmark) | Platinum | 90,000^{‡} |
| France (SNEP) | Diamond | 333,333^{‡} |
| Germany (BVMI) | Platinum | 400,000^{‡} |
| Italy (FIMI) | 2× Platinum | 100,000^{‡} |
| New Zealand (RMNZ) | 5× Platinum | 150,000^{‡} |
| Norway (IFPI Norway) | Platinum | 60,000^{‡} |
| Poland (ZPAV) | 3× Platinum | 60,000^{‡} |
| Portugal (AFP) | 2× Platinum | 20,000^{‡} |
| Spain (Promusicae) | 3× Platinum | 180,000^{‡} |
| Switzerland (IFPI Switzerland) | 2× Platinum | 40,000^{‡} |
| United Kingdom (BPI) | 3× Platinum | 1,800,000^{‡} |
| United States (RIAA) | 11× Platinum | 11,000,000^{‡} |
Streaming
| Greece (IFPI Greece) | 2× Platinum | 4,000,000^{†} |
^{‡} Sales+streaming figures based on certification alone.^{†} Streaming-only figures based on certification alone.

== Release history ==
List of release dates, showing region, format(s), label(s) and reference(s)
| Region | Date | Format(s) | Version | Label(s) | Ref. |
|---|---|---|---|---|---|
| Italy | May 25, 2018 | Contemporary hit radio | Original | Warner Music | |
| United Kingdom | May 25, 2018 | Contemporary hit radio | Original | Warner Music | |
| United States | May 29, 2018 | Contemporary hit radio | Original | KSR; Atlantic | |
| United States | May 29, 2018 | Urban contemporary | Original | KSR; Atlantic | |
| Various | June 22, 2018 | Digital download; streaming | Dillon Francis remix | Atlantic | |
| Italy | June 27, 2018 | Contemporary hit radio | Dillon Francis remix | Warner Music | |
| United States | June 28, 2018 | 12-inch single | Original | Atlantic | |
| Canada | June 28, 2018 | 12-inch single | Original | Atlantic | |
| Germany | July 2, 2018 | 12-inch single | Original | Warner Music | |
| Switzerland | July 2, 2018 | 12-inch single | Original | Warner Music | |
| Germany | August 24, 2018 | Digital download; streaming | German remix | Warner Music | |
