= Amparo Arrebato =

Colombian dancer (1944–2004)

- Born: Amparo Ramos Correa; December 30, 1944; Cali, Colombia
- Died: March 15, 2004 (aged 59); Cali, Colombia
- Occupation: Dancer
- Years active: 1960–2004
- Spouse: Silvio Castro
- Children: 2
- Career
- Dances: Salsa, Mambo, Boogaloo

Amparo Ramos Correa (30 December 1944 – 15 March 2004), better known by her stage name Amparo Arrebato, was a Colombian salsa dancer widely hailed as one of the most outstanding salsa dancers of her generation. She was nicknamed "Amparo Arrebato" (Spanish for “rapture” or “furor”) for her energetic, passionate dance style that mesmerized both partners and spectators. Before turning to dance, Ramos was an accomplished athlete – she set a national junior record in the 60-metre sprint and won multiple regional track titles. Her life and legend inspired Richie Ray & Bobby Cruz’s 1970 salsa hit “Amparo Arrebato” and a 2021 Telepacífico miniseries of the same name.

== Early life and athletics ==
Ramos was born in Cali, and grew up in the working-class barrio El Hoyo. The youngest of four children, she was raised by her widowed mother, María de Jesús Correa, who made ends meet by renting out rooms in their home. Among the lodgers in her childhood house were two local legends: Jovita Feijóo and football star Jairo Arboleda. As a student Ramos excelled at basketball and sprinting, becoming departmental champion in the 100 m, 200 m and 400 m, and lowering the Colombian junior record for 60 m to 7.8 seconds at the national games. She trained on the parade grounds of the Cali Air Base until social dancing eclipsed competitive sport in her late teens – by age 16 she was winning local dance contests.

== Dance career ==
1960s. In 1962, during a show at the Coliseo Evangelista Mora, Cuban bandleader Dámaso Pérez Prado noticed her and invited the 17-year-old to join his professional troupe in Mexico – an offer she declined. On 26 December 1968 her breakthrough came at the Caseta Panamericana: the visiting New York duo Richie Ray & Bobby Cruz saw her perform and were astonished.

1970s. The duo returned the following year with a new tribute song titled “Amparo Arrebato”, which they included on their 1970 LP Agúzate. The song turned her into a celebrity and is considered a salsa standard. Although there was speculation that the song may have referred to another dancer, Richie Ray confirmed that Ramos was the true inspiration. Ramos toured Colombia with the Ballet de la Salsa and performed at clubs such as Honka Monka, Grill San Nicolás, and La Terraza del Belalcázar.

1980s. In the early 1980s she scaled back her public dancing after the death of her long-time dance partner Enrique Cabezas. She worked at Fruco to support her family but continued hosting dance events on her birthday.

=== Critical acclaim and legacy ===
Press retrospectives consistently rank her among the greats:

- El País described her as “by far one of the best dancers of her era, a trend-setter”.
- Writer Reinaldo Spitaletta called her the “Marlene Dietrich of salsa”.
- Las2Orillas called her “the mythical salsa dancer who opened the door for thousands of other dancers”.
- Music. “Amparo Arrebato” by Richie Ray & Bobby Cruz remains a classic salsa anthem that helped put Cali on the map.
- Television. A biographical drama, *Amparo Arrebato*, aired on Telepacífico in 2021 starring Martha Isabel Bolaños, who received a Premios Catalina nomination for her role.
- Cultural icon. Ramos called herself “a patrimonio of Cali”. Her birthday is still commemorated by Cali's salsa fans.

== Personal life ==
Ramos married DJ Silvio Castro and had two children, María Angélica and Orlando. Her son Orlando was murdered in 2000, after which she became less active publicly. In later years, she taught dance classes and sold artisanal miniatures. She also hosted a weekly dance gathering for older salseros.

== Death ==
She died of a heart attack on 15 March 2004 at Hospital San Juan de Dios in Cali at age 59. Her funeral was attended by many from the salsa community.
