= I Like It Like That (Pete Rodriguez song) =

1967 single by Pete Rodriguez

- Side A of US single of Pete Rodriguez recording

Single by Pete Rodriguez

from the album I Like It Like That (A Mi Me Gusta Asi)
- Released: 1967
- Recorded: 1967
- Genre: Boogaloo
- Length: 4:26
- Label: Alegre
- Songwriters: Tony Pabon; Manny Rodriguez
- Producer: Pancho Cristal

Audio
- "I Like It Like That" on YouTube

"I Like It Like That" is a song written by Tony Pabon and Manny Rodriguez. It was initially a hit for boogaloo musician Pete Rodriguez in 1967, and was one of the most influential boogaloo songs of the era. Rodriguez released an album in 1967 with the same title.

== Pete Rodriguez version ==
Tony Pabon and Manny Rodriguez originally wrote "I Like It Like That" in 1967. Tony Pabon sang the vocals for the song, while the instrumentals were performed by Pete Rodriguez Orchestra. The recording was engineered by Fred Weinberg at National Recording Studios in New York City and produced by Roulette Records producer Morrie Pelsman, also known as Pancho Cristal, for Roulette Records. Part of the recording used the musician's kids chanting "Ahh Bibi!" which seemed to add to the excitement of the song.

At the request of Pancho Cristal, Weinberg delivered a copy to Roulette Records' owner Morris Levy. According to Weinberg, "Levy wanted the kids that were singing on the song removed as they sounded out of tune", however by that time a copy of the song was delivered to a disk jockey named Symphony Sid at WEVD. Symphony Sid had a huge diverse audience. The record hit the airwaves at WEVD and requests from the listeners poured in. At the suggestion of Weinberg, Morris Levy left the kids singing in the recording.

== The Blackout All-Stars version ==
"I Like It"
- Artwork for the 1996 US CD single re-release

Single by The Blackout All-Stars

from the album I Like It Like That, Volume I
- Released: October 1994
- Recorded: 1994
- Genre: Latin; pop
- Length: 3:49 (album version)
- Label: Columbia
- Songwriters: Tony Pabon; Manny Rodriguez
- Producer: Sergio George

Music video
- "I Like It (Like That)" on YouTube

The song was covered by Latin supergroup The Blackout All-Stars, under the title "I Like It", from volume 1 of the soundtrack to the 1994 film I Like It Like That.

The song was the group's only recording, as well as their only release to chart, peaking at #25 on the Billboard Hot 100 chart in the United States.

It was also used in the French movie Les Dalton when the Dalton brothers travel to Mexico to face a super machine gun to (El Tarlo) for removing the magic hat.

=== Background ===
The Blackout All-Stars was a one-off musical supergroup, consisting of Latin music artists: Ray Barretto, Sheila E., Tito Puente, Tito Nieves, Paquito D'Rivera, Dave Valentin and Grover Washington Jr. Other members of the group were Jose “Ite” Jerez (trumpet), Luis Disla (baritone saxophone), William Cepeda (trombone), and Ruben Rodriguez (bass)

The group was formed in 1994 to record the song "I Like It", the title song for the film I Like It Like That. Lead vocals were by Nieves, while the rest of the group provided instrumentals or background vocals to the song. The song was later placed in volume 1 of the soundtrack to the film, and released as a single to promote the soundtrack. 12" and CD maxi singles were released, but the rendition failed to gain huge attention.

==== Resurgence in popularity ====
In 1996, roughly three years after the song's original release, Burger King used the song in a commercial promoting their "Have it your way" slogan. Following its inclusion in these commercials, a remixed version of the song started to pick up radio airplay. The song then started to climb the U.S. Billboard charts, peaking at #25 on the Billboard Hot 100 chart. The accompanying music video gained rotation on music video networks such as MTV BET and VH1. CD singles were also released. In 1997, Tito Nieves, the lead singer of the song, re-recorded the song on his album, I Like It Like That.

=== Critical reception ===
Jeremy Helligar of Entertainment Weekly gave the song a B, saying it was a "swinging number" and that "only a hopeless couch potato could possibly not like it."

=== Formats and track listings ===
12" 45 single (Columbia, 1994)

1. "I Like It" (Reefa! extended mix) — 5:39
2. "I Like It" (Reefa! 12" remix) — 6:56

12" single (Columbia, 1994)

A1 "I Like It" (D'Ambrosio club mix) – 7:03
A2 "I Like It" (D'Ambrosio dub mix) – 6:19
B1 "I Like It" (Flipsquad mix) – 4:51
B2 "I Like It" (Album mix) – 3:47

12" promo single (Columbia, 1994)

A1 "I Like It" (D'Ambrosio club mix) – 7:03
A2 "I Like It" (D'Ambrosio dub mix) – 6:19
B1 "I Like It" (Jason Nevins Turbo Beat remix) – 8:01
B2 "I Like It" ('97 Master Blaster) – 8:16

CD maxi single (Columbia, 1994)

1. "I Like It" (Reefa! 7") – 3:28
2. "I Like It" (Reefa! extended mix) – 5:39
3. "I Like It" (Reefa! 12" remix) – 6:56
4. "I Like It" (album version) – 3:48

CD single (Columbia, 1996)

1. "I Like It" (edit) – 4:20
2. "Joy/Reach/I'm Gonna Get You" (by Staxx of Joy/Robi Rob's Club World featuring Deborah Cooper/Bizarre Inc.)

=== Charts ===
Chart (1996–1997)	Peak position
US Billboard Hot 100	25
US Hot Dance Club Play (Billboard)	19
US Hot Dance Music/Maxi-Singles Sales (Billboard)	45
US Mainstream Top 40 (Billboard)	25
US Rhythmic (Billboard)	15

=== Year-end charts ===
Chart (1997)	Position
US Billboard Hot 100	97

== Sampling ==
In 2018, the Rodriguez recording of the song was sampled in the song "I Like It" by Cardi B, featuring Bad Bunny and J Balvin, from her debut album Invasion of Privacy.
