= Pete Rodriguez (boogaloo musician) =

Pete Rodríguez
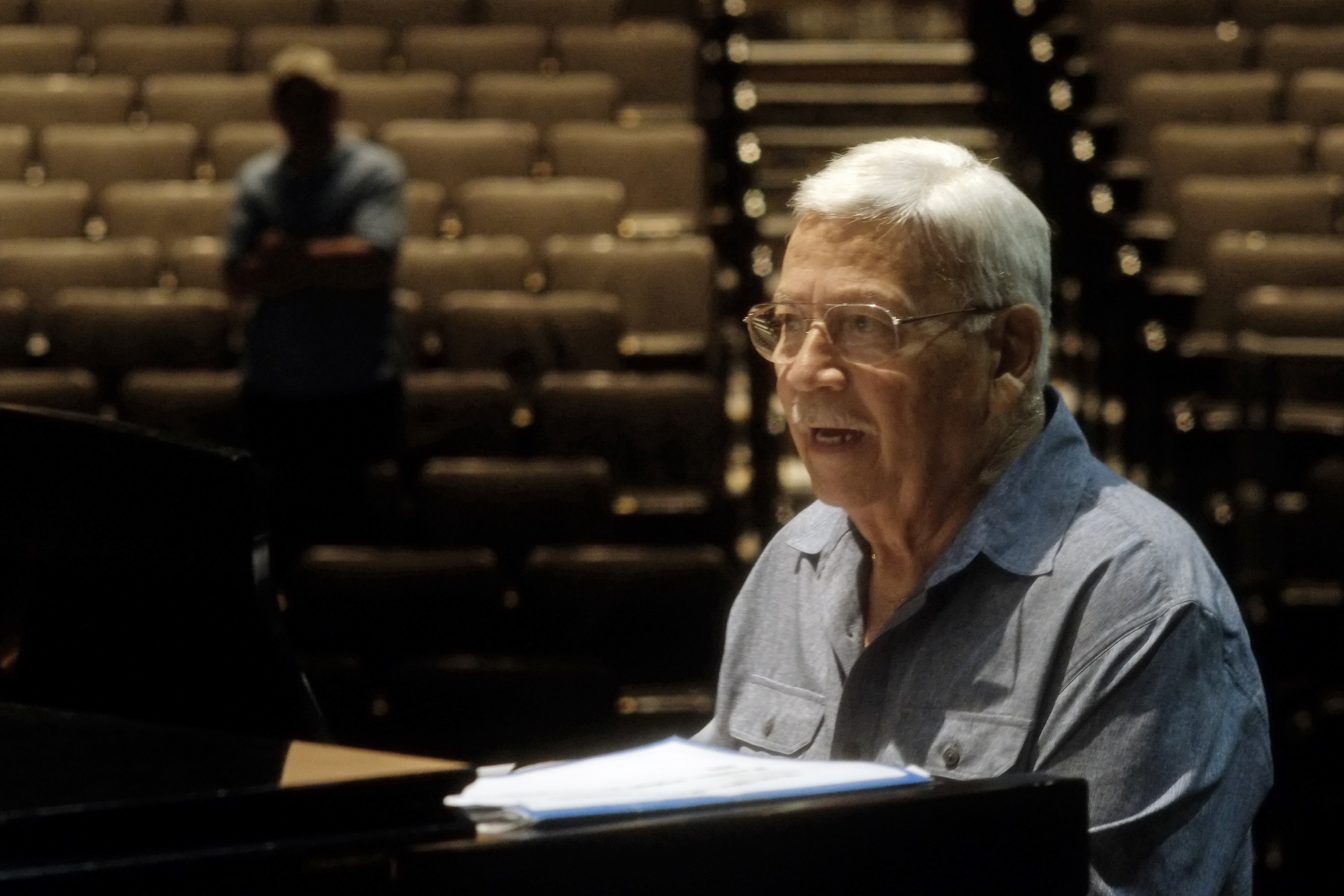
- Rodriguez in 2015

Background information
- Also known as: "Pete Rodriguez y su Conjunto"
- Born: April 16, 1934; Bronx, New York City, U.S.
- Died: March 7, 2024 (aged 89)
- Genres: Latin boogaloo
- Occupation: Musician

Pete Rodriguez (April 16, 1934 – March 7, 2024) was an American pianist and bandleader born in The Bronx, New York, to Puerto Rican parents.

== Biography ==
Rodriguez's band, Pete Rodríguez y Su Conjunto, specialized in Latin boogaloo. Their most successful song, "I Like It Like That" (1967), made it to the national Billboard charts and has since been covered several times, including by the Blackout All-Stars for the soundtrack of the 1994 movie I Like It Like That. It received renewed exposure as the soundtrack to the main ident of Odeon Cinemas from 1998 to 2003. It featured in the soundtrack of the video game Grand Theft Auto: Vice City Stories, on the fictitious Latin music radio station "Radio Espantoso", and in the 2014 film Chef.

"I Like It Like That", along with "Oh, That's Nice!" (1967), was then sampled in the 2018 song "I Like It" recorded by Cardi B, Bad Bunny, and J Balvin.

"Oye Mira" was sampled in the 2021 song "Vielen Dank" recorded by the German hip-hop band 187 Strassenbande. It hit the #5 spot on Germany's Offizielle Deutsche Chart on May 28, 2021.

Rodriguez died on March 7, 2024, at the age of 89.

== Discography ==
- At Last! (Remo LPR-1511, 1964)
- La Reencarnación [reissued title: The King of the Boogaloo] (Remo LPR-1517, 1965)
- Latin Boogaloo (Alegre LPA-852, 1966)
- I Like It Like That (A Mi Me Gusta Así) (Alegre LPA-855, 1967)
- Oh, That's Nice! (Ay, Qué Bueno!) (Alegre LPA-860, 1967)
- Christmas Boogaloo (Boogaloo Navideño) (Alegre LPA-861, 1967)
- Hot & Wild (Yo Vengo Soltando Chispas) (Alegre LPA-865, 1968)
- Latin Soul Man (Alegre LPA-875, 1968)
- The Best of Pete Rodriguez (Lo Mejor De Pete Rodriguez) (Alegre LPA-878, 1969) compilation
- Now! (Alegre LPA 881, 1970)
- From Panama To New York (De Panamá a Nueva York) with Ruben Blades (Alegre LPA-885, 1970)
- Right On! Ahí Na' Ma'! (All-Art Records SLP-1567, 1971)
- El Rey del Boogaloo! (Vampi Soul [Spain] 023, 2003) compilation
