= The Blackout All-Stars =

American musical group

- Origin: New York City, New York, United States
- Years active: 1994
- Past members: Ray Barretto; Sheila E. Tito Puente; Tito Nieves; Paquito D'Rivera; Dave Valentin; Grover Washington Jr. Sergio George

The Blackout All-Stars was a one-off 1994 Latin music supergroup consisting of Ray Barretto, Sheila E., Tito Puente, Tito Nieves, Paquito D'Rivera, Dave Valentin, and Grover Washington Jr.. Their only release, the single "I Like It", was recorded and released in 1994, but became a surprise hit in 1996-1997 after new club and radio exposure and inclusion in a commercial for Burger King, eventually reaching #25 on the Billboard Hot 100.

== History ==
The group released one single, "I Like It", originally co-written by Tony Pabón and recorded in 1967 by Pete Rodriguez with Pabón on lead vocals under the title "I Like It Like That". The Blackout Allstars' version of "I Like It", done in a salsa style, was recorded as the theme song for the 1994 film I Like It Like That and was included on the first volume of the film's two soundtracks. Nieves was the lead vocalist and was brought onto the project by Sergio George, who produced the track for the film.

The song was released on CD and 12" singles and was promoted to clubs and radio in late 1994, but according to Columbia Records promoter John Strazza, "by then, the movie had bombed, and no one paid attention to the single." However, in mid-1995, club DJs started picking up the track, and it was remixed by Bobby D'Ambrosio as a Latin dance track for inclusion on a compilation album, Global Basics: Dance Music for the Millennium. A third edit was carried out by New York City dance music station WKTU, which put the record into rotation in the summer of 1996. This led to strong interest in the track in clubs in New York and New Jersey, and soon after, Columbia placed the song into a nationally-running commercial for Burger King. With the song's popularity increasing due to this new exposure, a CD single with a shortened version of the D'Ambrosio edit was released and the song began climbing the US pop charts.

The song was the only single on the Top 40 without an accompanying music video at the time of its peak popularity. It peaked at No. 25 on the Billboard Hot 100 the following year.

The song is included in Nieves's solo album I Like It Like That. Nieves attempted to build on the popularity of "I Like It" by releasing a dance-inflected recording of the Joe Cuba song "Bang Bang", but the track did not reach the Billboard Hot 100.

The Blackout All-Stars remained a one-off, despite the song's renewed popularity. Grover Washington Jr. died on December 17, 1999, of a heart attack. Tito Puente died of heart failure on May 31, 2000, as did Ray Barretto on February 17, 2006. Dave Valentin died in 2017.

== Other members ==
- Jose “Ite” Jerez (trumpet)
- Luis Disla (baritone saxophone)
- William Cepeda (trombone)
- Ruben Rodriguez (bass)

== Discography ==
Singles

- 1994/1996: "I Like It" No. 25 U.S.
