= Jala Jala y Boogaloo =

Studio album by Richie Ray & Bobby Cruz
- Released: 1967
- Genre: Salsa Music, Boogaloo
- Label: Alegre
- Producer: Pancho Cristal, Fred Weinberg

Richie Ray & Bobby Cruz chronology
Jala Jala y Boogaloo	Jala Jala Boogaloo Volume II

Professional ratings
Review scores
Source	Rating
Allmusic	4.5/5 stars

Jala Jala y Boogaloo is an album released by the salsa music duet Richie Ray & Bobby Cruz. Released in 1967, the album is influenced not only by Latin rhythms such as the Puerto Rican Jala Jala, but also by beat music.

Backed by the lead single "Richie's Jala Jala", the album was an international success, being popular in the United States, Colombia, Puerto Rico and other countries. The album's success led to the release of the follow-up Jala Jala Boogaloo Volume II with a similar cover and sound.

== Background ==
With their previous albums, Richie Ray & Bobby Cruz had established themselves as prominent artists in the New York music scene of the 1960s. Following the success of hit singles such as "El Mulato," the duet received a contract with the Tico and Alegre record companies presided by Morris Levy. Moris Pelsman, Levy's partner, designated the famous Pancho Cristal to produce and supervise the duet's new recordings.

After releasing Se Soltó early on that same year, Richie Ray & Bobby Cruz went into the studio with Pancho Cristal and engineers Fred Weinberg and Rodrigo Zavala to record what would be the group's most successful album to that time.

== Music ==
Musically, the album is a synthesis of the musical trends that were popular in 1967. The Boogaloo craze was at its highest and the Jala-Jala rhythm had begun to be known outside its native Puerto Rico. Also, Rock Music was at its highest with artists such as The Beatles at the top of the charts. All these ended up influencing the composition and recording of the Jala Jala y Boogaloo album.

"Richie's Jala Jala" is a Jala-Jala song in which Richie's Piano riff is an imitation of the cowbell's sound. The song is notable for the protagonic role of the trumpets, played by Pedro Chaparro and Doc Cheatham, which gave the jala-jala genre a new sound.

"Baby Don't You Cry" is a boogaloo number, with a heavy influence from Afro-American soul music. The use of English-language lyrics and soul-influenced singing is evidence of the North American influence on the song. "Colombia's Boogaloo", the first of many songs the group will dedicate to the Colombian nation, is a mix of Cuban Son montuno with boogaloo.

"Gentle Rain" is a cover of a bossa nova song by Luiz Bonfá, translated to Spanish by Pancho Cristal and transformed into a bolero. "3 and 1 Mozambique" is an example of Mozambique Rhythm, and the hit single "Bomba Camará" is a salsa song.

Lyrically the album shows both influences from Caribbean folklore as well as from North American culture. For instance, "Stop, Look and Listen" lyrics deal with pacifism, a common theme in the Counterculture of the 1960s; In contrast, "Cabo E" references the deity Changó as well as other gods of the Santería, a syncretic religion of the Afro-Caribbean culture.

== Track listing ==
No.	Title	Writer(s)	Length
1.	"Richie's Jala Jala"	R. Ray - B. Cruz	5:04
2.	"Baby Don't You Cry"	R. Ray - B. Cruz	4:00
3.	"Colombia's Boogaloo"	R. Ray - B. Cruz	4:07
4.	"Stop, Look and Listen"	R. Ray - B. Cruz	1:53
5.	"Lo Atará la Arache"	H. González	4:30
6.	"Cabo E"	D.R.	4:13
7.	"Gentle Rain"	L. Bonfá - Cristal	3:47
8.	"3 and 1 Mozambique"	R. Ray - B. Cruz	6:02
9.	"Bomba Camará"	R. Ray - B. Cruz	5:43
