= Agúzate =

Studio album by Richie Ray & Bobby Cruz
- Released: 1970
- Genres: Salsa, Bolero
- Label: Alegre
- Producer: Miguel Estivill

Richie Ray & Bobby Cruz chronology
Viva Ricardo (1969)	Agúzate (1970)	El diferente (1970)

Professional ratings
Review scores
Source	Rating
AllMusic	4.5/5 stars

Agúzate (Hurry Up) is an album released in 1970 by the salsa music duet Richie Ray & Bobby Cruz. The album was critically and commercially successful, having two huge radio hits: the title track and "Amparo Arrebato", a song about the Colombian dancer of the same name. Other tracks received significant radio airplay ("Vive Feliz", "Guaguancó Raro", "Traigo de Todo", "A Mi Manera") even in a time when radio broadcasting available for salsa music was very limited.

== Track listing ==
No.	Title	Writer(s)	Length
1.	"Agúzate"	R. Ray – B. Cruz	6:13
2.	"Amparo Arrebato"	R. Ray – B. Cruz	4:55
3.	"You've Lost That Lovin' Feelin'" (Lyrics translated to Spanish by Bobby Cruz)	Phil Spector, Barry Mann, Cynthia Weil	4:15
4.	"Vive Feliz"	Alice Lancia	5:00
5.	"Guaguancó Raro"	Justi Barreto	6:14
6.	"Traigo de Todo"		5:00
7.	"Soul and Inspiration"	Barry Mann, Cynthia Weil	2:55
8.	"A Mi Manera" (Lyrics translated to Spanish by Bobby Cruz)	Claude François, Jacques Revaux, Paul Anka	4:17
