= Aula Magna (Central University of Venezuela) =

University concert hall in Caracas, Venezuela

Aula Magna, UCV
UNESCO World Heritage Site
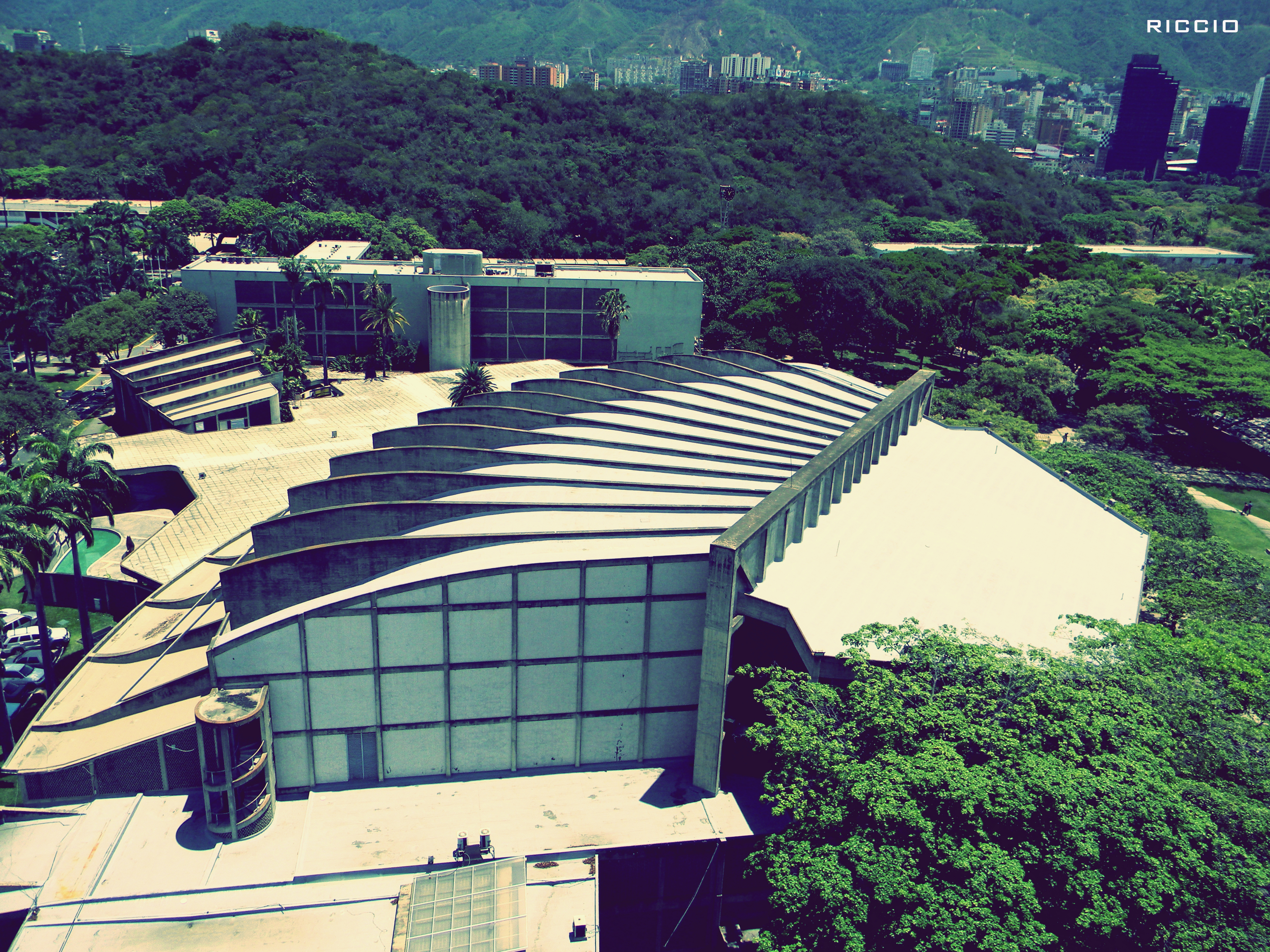
- An aerial view of the hall in 2011

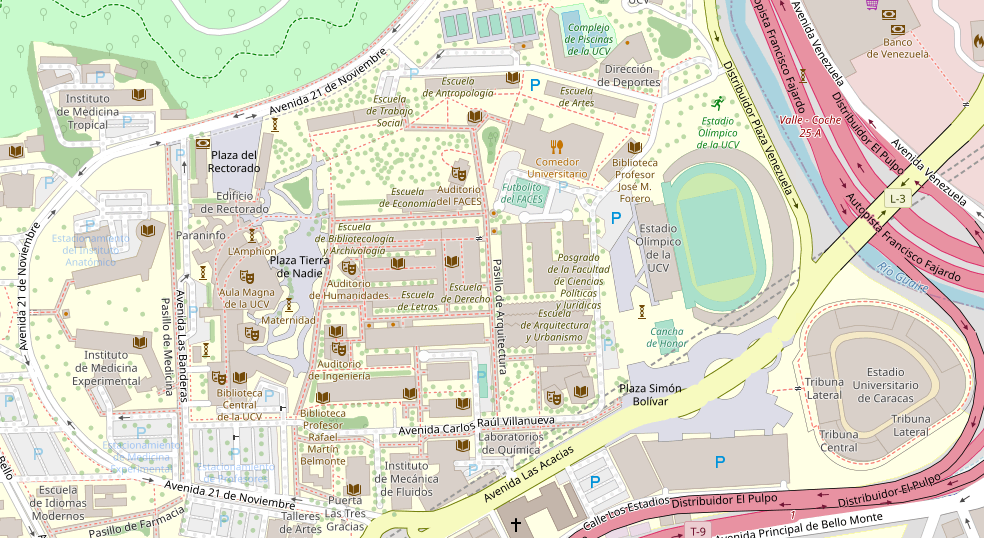
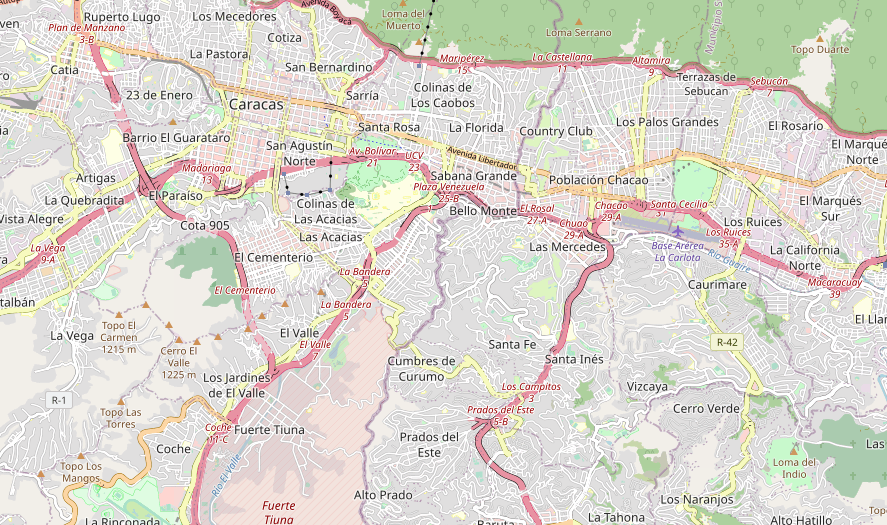
- Location within UCV Conjunto Central Location within Caracas Location within Venezuela
- Location: University City of Caracas, Caracas, Venezuela
- Criteria: Cultural: (i), (iv)
- Reference: 986
- Inscription: 2000 (24th Session)
- Coordinates: 10°29′27″N 66°53′26″W

The Aula Magna is an auditorium at the Central University of Venezuela. It is located within the University City of Caracas, next to the University's main library building. The hall was designed by the Venezuelan architect Carlos Raúl Villanueva in the 1940s and built by the Danish company Christiani & Nielsen from 1952–53. It was declared a UNESCO World Heritage Site in November 2000 for being artistically and architecturally significant. The most notable feature of the hall is its acoustic 'clouds', which serve both aesthetic and practical functions. They are an element of the hall's design which contributed to the science of interior space acoustics, though the building exterior is also architecturally significant.

The Aula Magna has been named the "most important auditorium" at the university. This is in part because of practicality: it is the largest capacity auditorium, being able to hold approximately 2,700 people with removable seats. However, it is also significant because of the academic, artistic, and political events which have taken place within it. Some of these events have been of great importance for the country and some have been part of historical movements. In present-day Caracas, the hall has been a site of political controversy, as well as suffering from a lack of maintenance funds.

The current director of the hall is Trina Medina, with the assistant director Rosario Silva Prieto.

== Construction ==
When the University City was commissioned in 1943, a committee was formed to analyse planning options. As well as choosing the location near Central Caracas, the committee also recommended basing the plan for the campus on similar models, including Leopold Rother's "urban project" at the recently opened National University of Colombia in Bogotá.

Designs for the central campus complex were begun in 1944, with architect Carlos Raúl Villanueva drawing up early studies and an outline plan. In the next few years, the medical complex at the university was built, causing the design to undergo "substantial changes" in 1949. The final design was complete by 1952. The ability to make changes to the plans was due in part to Venezuela's economic prosperity and in part to Villanueva's accommodating personality. Of his works during this period, the Aula Magna is considered groundbreaking. Villanueva was capable of adapting his work, while remaining true to his Modernist principles, and was open to changing designs as ideas for the construction evolved. In keeping with the theme of the project, Villanueva's designs include unconventional features that reflect the artistic nature, such as describing buildings not as objects but as "movements" (of which the Aula Magna is IV). The Aula Magna and Plaza Cubierta were placed at the centre of the campus project, as the culmination of its other elements.

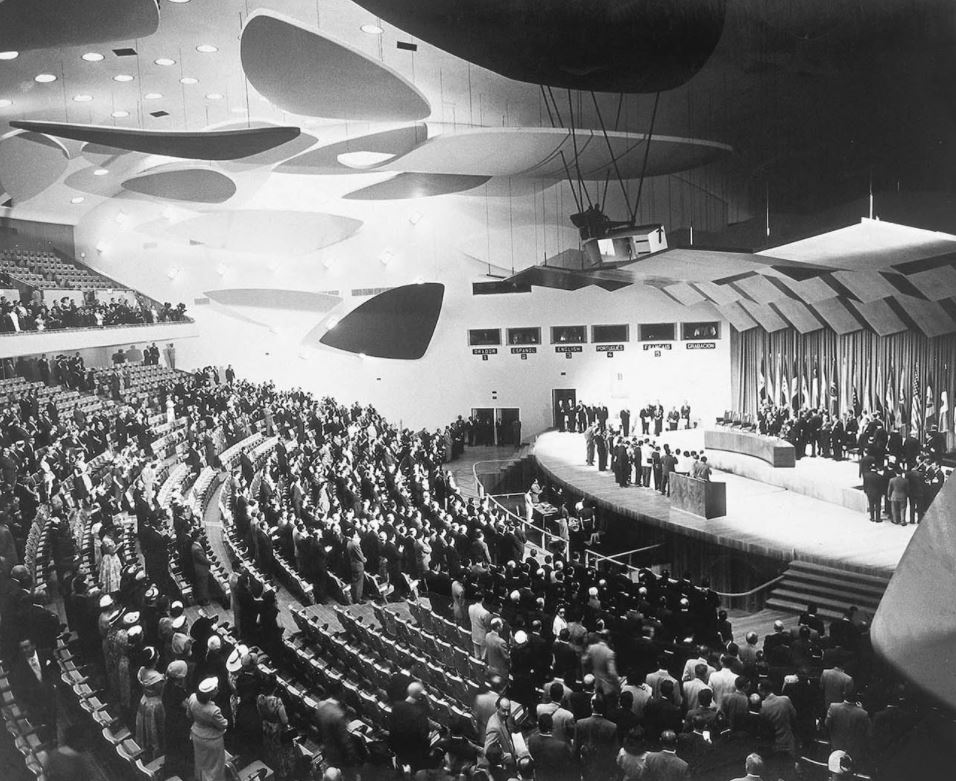
10th Pan-American Conference held in the hall in 1954.

The contract for the construction of the Aula Magna was given to the company Christiani & Nielsen, starting on November 28, 1952, and with its end date set as March 31, 1953; that is, the work had to be completed in only 4 months. The hall was finished on time, as demanded by the military dictator Marcos Pérez Jiménez. It was the main building of the Synthesis of the Arts project for the university, a campus creation and redesign carried out by Villanueva. The hall was dedicated and opened on December 3, 1953, with a small religious ceremony, but officially inaugurated on March 2, 1954, with the opening of the 10th Inter-American Conference.

In an apocryphal event, when Villanueva first entered the completed hall and saw the freshly painted acoustic clouds, he threw his arms up and shouted that it was tremendous. Villanueva's collaboration with Alexander Calder, the North American artist and engineer who designed and created the hall's famous 'Floating Clouds', would begin a long working relationship between the pair, though Calder only saw the completed hall once, in 1955.

== Specifications ==
=== Acoustics ===
==== Nubes de Calder ====
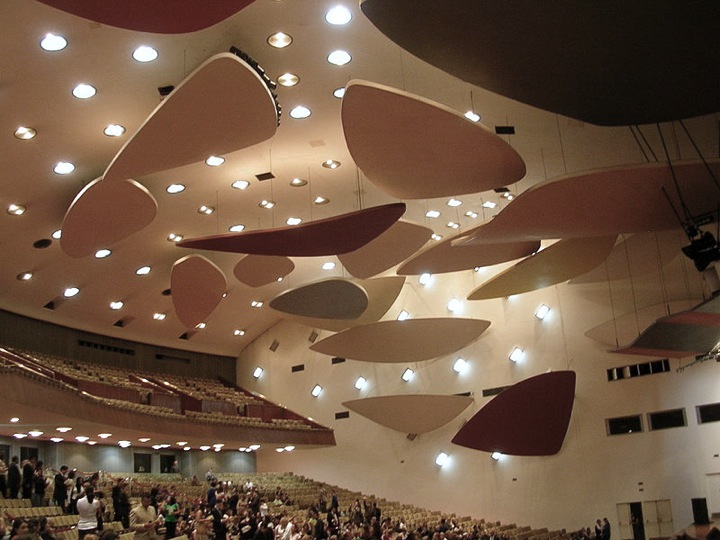
Interior of the hall, featuring the 1953 Floating Clouds acoustic panels artwork by Alexander Calder

In the 1980s, the acoustics engineer Leo Beranek, who contributed to the project, ranked the hall in the world's top five concert halls for its acoustics. It is so ranked thanks to the 1953 Flying Saucers or Floating Clouds artwork developed by Alexander Calder, a system that combines technology and art. These structures were installed on the ceiling under the supervision of the American firm Bolt, Beranek and Newman, and adjusted while an orchestra played on stage to calibrate the acoustics and make sure the quality remained consistent throughout the hall. The clouds are the most prominent example of the philosophy of the project to combine art and thought as well as function.

The clouds were not originally intended for the interior of the hall. Calder was working on a structure for outside in the Plaza Cubierta; when he became aware of how complex the project was, he suggested integrating his panels into the space of the room with "an artistic, decorative and acoustic purpose". This was a fortunate idea, because at the same time as Calder's suggestion, the American company was viewing the hall's original designs, and noted that the shape of the structure would detrimentally affect the acoustics unless it had extensive panelling. The design has given its inspiration to other venues, including an opera hall in China. The problem-solving function of the panelling was also an influence in the development of interior space acoustics. The panels serve a variety of purposes, with some absorbing sound, some projecting it, and some magnifying it.

Each panel, or cloud, comprises a steel frame containing two pieces of 1/2-inch (13 mm) thick laminated wood secured together; the largest cloud has an area of 860 square feet (80 m^{2}) and a weight of approximately 2.5 short tons (2.3 t). The clouds are between 4 and 8 inches (100 and 200 mm) thick, and in total there are 31 panels: 22 on the ceiling, 5 on the right side wall and 4 on the left side wall. To position the clouds, 3/8 inch (9 1/2 mm) metal cables suspend them from the ceiling of the room, giving them the necessary inclination and height. The real ceiling of the room is 9.8 feet (3 m) above a false plaster ceiling which supports the panelling and facilitates adjustment of lighting systems and the support mechanisms of the "clouds". There are also ladders to allow people to climb through the clouds. A fiberglass sheet was installed above the panels, to reduce echo and sound transfer time, and optimize the acoustics for speech. It is possible to remove this sheet for musical concerts.

In terms of artistic qualities, the art critic Phyllis Tuchman noted that the clouds are "colorfully curving and thus archetypically 'Latin American'" but were designed by one of the few non-Latin Americans working on the project, making them "paradoxical" but still "expressing the region's 'lyricism'", as well as "resembl[ing] clouds scattered across a night sky [...] [w]ith the hall darkened" and making those who "[enter] the auditorium when it's illuminated by houselights [...] able to feel as if they have entered a multihued, three-dimensional abstract painting". Tuchman also noted that, when asked, Calder readily named his favorite work as the clouds, though they are less remembered within his oeuvre than many of his other works. The critics Helen Gyger and Patricio del Real write that "the Aula Magna's interior [...] represents the high-point of Villanueva's interest in the synthesis of the arts".

In UNESCO's World Heritage listing of the campus, the Clouds are named specifically.

==== Other elements ====
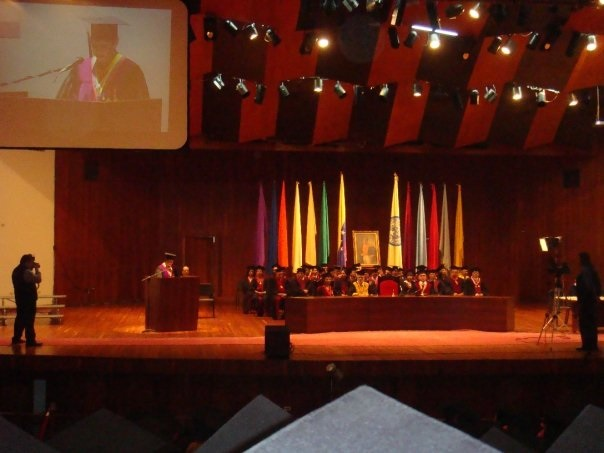
A graduation ceremony below the folded wooden ceiling

The 'Floating Clouds' are not the only element that helps to provide the characteristic sound quality to the Aula Magna. Within the auditorium most of the elements and materials are designed in favor of acoustics and durability. The seats exemplify this. They are made from the wool of either Chilean or Australian sheep (sources contradict) and were woven in England with a stitched furrow, have leather arms, and have seat cushions that automatically retract and are perforated on the bottom. This design gives the seats the quality of counteracting sound variations, both when empty and fully occupied.

Another element is that all the doors in the room are acoustically designed and double-layered (internal and external); on the parterre level the internal doors are made of perforated metal and filled with an insulator, while the external ones are made of wood, creating a vacuum between them that prevents both the exit of sound from the hall and excludes external noise. On the balcony level, the doors function in the same way, though both the internal and external doors are made of wood. There is also a folded wooden canopy positioned eight meters above the stage to further soften sound.

The original design of the hall included aisle carpets made of cashmere wool, which also helped the acoustics. However, during renovations in the 1990s, the carpets were replaced with ones made from synthetic material.

=== Lighting systems ===
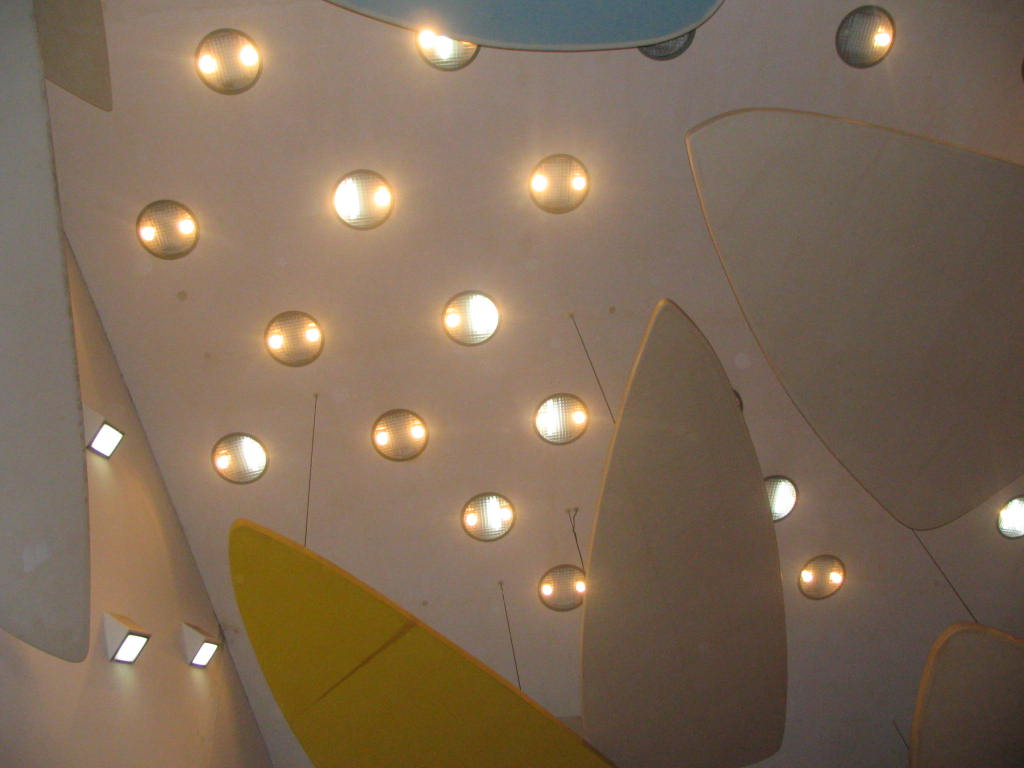
The additional lighting behind the "clouds" used to create effects

The lighting is versatile, having two main systems (incandescent and fluorescent), side lighting bulbs, and emergency lamps. It also has the original alternative lighting system of bulbs above the clouds that illuminate the ceiling and highlight the color of the panels. This lighting also has a series of instruments to produce lighting effects, including spotlights, reflectors, and projectors. The former main lighting console was a duplicate of a lighting organ, created in England by Strand Lighting, which adapted the keyboard of an organ to operate as a lighting control console. By playing different combinations of the organ keys, it is possible to create a whole light show. Seventeen of these were made by request for halls around the world, though some Caracas reporters state there were only two.

In 2010, the hall installed a new lighting system, donated by the US Embassy in Caracas, with a console produced by the company Electronic Theatre Controls. It became the third theatre building in Caracas to have the technology, which was state-of-the-art. In spite of the new addition, the original organ technology was still functional in 2017.

=== Structure and facade ===
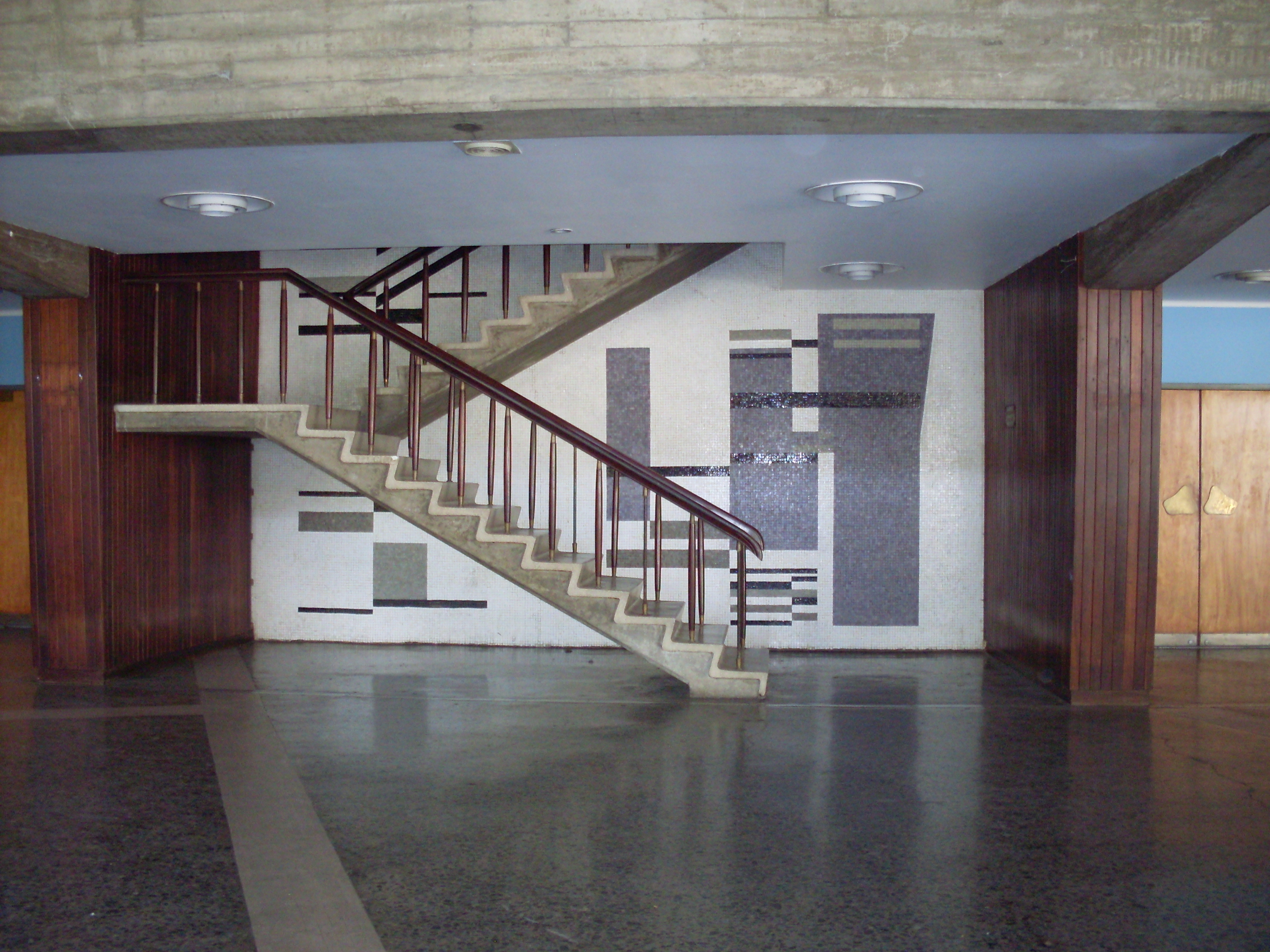
The staircase, with its mural by Carlos González Bogen

The architectural style of the Aula Magna is inspired by the classic Greco-Roman theatre, with a 1/4-circle structure and a fan-shaped ceiling, designed like an amphitheater or conch shell. On its exterior is a 43-meter truss, which was inspired by Le Corbusier's unrealised designs for the Palace of Soviets. The hall is an integral part of the larger Plaza Cubierta space. The building forms a main part of the view of the Plaza Cubierta, but the entrances are only visible from within the square itself; it is also written that as "[s]een from the Aula Magna, all the spaces and buildings that [comprise] the [Plaza Cubierta] expand, starting from the solidity of the main piece". It also includes designs that were innovative for the time, such as the suspended balcony, an orchestra pit, and the large and open proscenium. Additionally, it is not only a building but "an interior space within a larger interior-exterior space", placing it inseparably within its confines in the central complex, and "irreplaceable". A study published in 1955 by the Museum of Modern Art that looked at Latin American architecture also noted the hall was "covered but only partially enclosed".

The parterre level of the hall has seven main entrances, along with two emergency exits, as well as 1722 seats divided into 6 blocks. The upper floor is divided into 3 balconies, with the left side balcony having 391 seats, the right side balcony having 390 seats, and the central balcony having 193 (of which 13 seats belong to the Box of Honor and are restricted). In addition, the hall has numerous removable seats for convenience.

If the original plans are taken as final, then the Aula Magna was never completed. This creates some incongruous features of the hall, including that the doors that are suspended on the sides of the stage would have been raised by hydraulic jacks, and that the space that today is the basement Art Gallery was intended to be a bar area and contain large bathrooms for the audience. Calder also wanted the clouds to be movable, to allow for different acoustic experiences, but they are not.

In the corridor of the Aula Magna building — a circular corridor running around the hall, with two levels of ramps following the curve and one artistic central cuboid staircase — there are many works of art. In the square outside is the sculpture "Pastor de Nubes", by Jean Arp. It is also surrounded by murals by Mateo Manaure, Victor Vasarely and Pascual Navarro, and other sculptures. The Aula Magna is within an intricate system of walkways, being part of the Plaza Cubierta and connected to other buildings in the central complex (the University President's office, the Sala de Conciertos, and the library), each by several distinct routes.

== Events ==
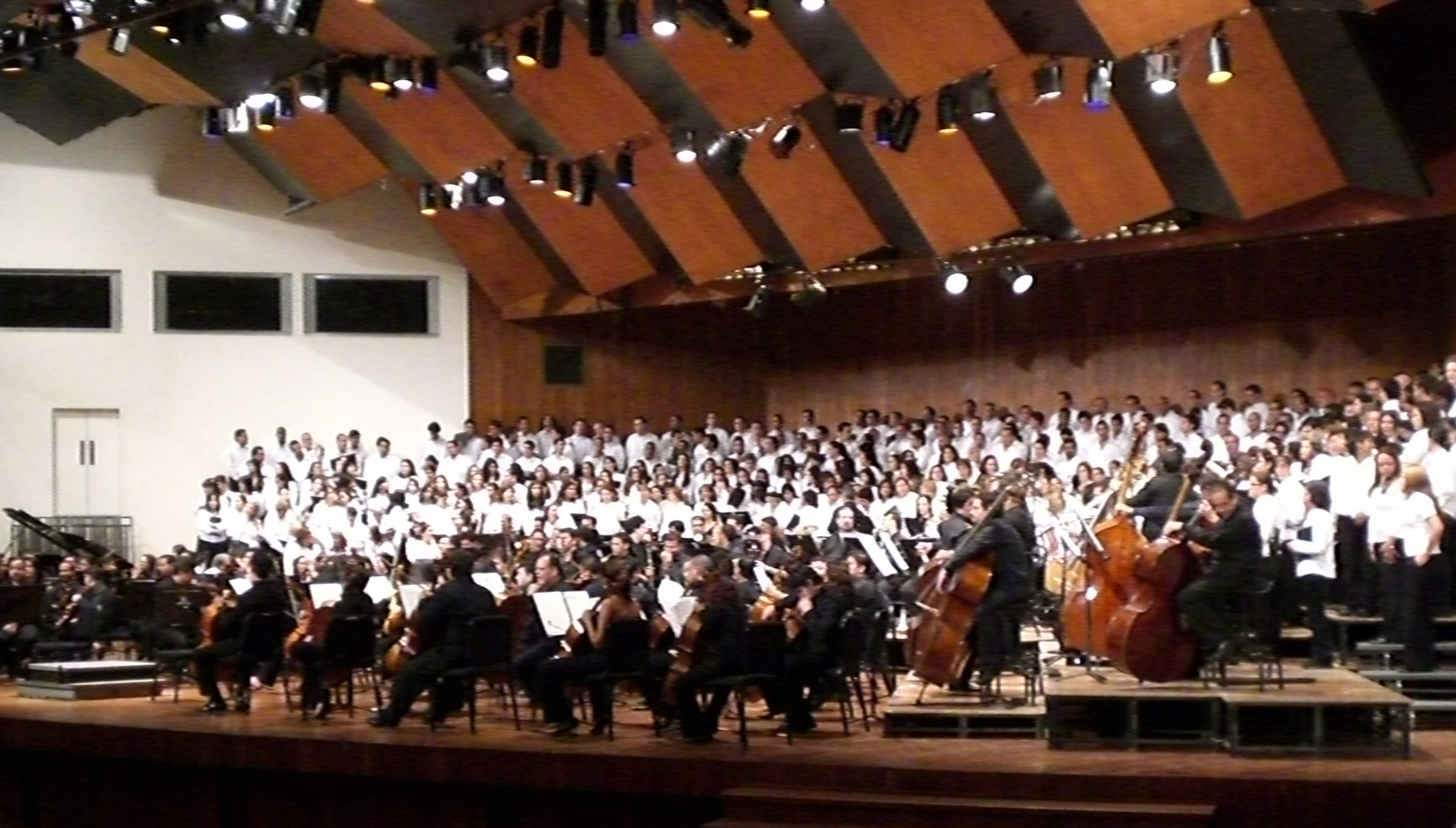
A performance by the Cantata Criolla, led by Antonio Estévez

It was in the hall, during its inauguration at the Inter-American Conference it hosted, that "three thousand leaders and delegates" of the Americas signed a historical resolution declaring Communism a threat to world peace. Conversely, in his first visit to Venezuela, in 1959 after the success of the communist Cuban Revolution, Fidel Castro spoke at the hall.

There have also been famous artistic performances. Leonard Bernstein performed at the hall in 1957, saying that it "was the best [hall] in which I conducted in South America. After the concert I told the reporters that the sound is excellent on stage. I would like to be able to take that part of the hall back to New York for the Philharmonic". Montserrat Caballe has sung in the hall, and Pablo Neruda recited his poetry in it.

The theatre company "Palo de Agua", operated by Michel Hausmann, was based in the hall until at least 2013. Hausmann, from a family with a history of opposition to Venezuelan presidents Hugo Chávez and Nicolás Maduro, explained that they were not allowed to perform in any of Caracas' main theatres because of the restriction and censorship of artistic expression in Venezuela, describing the hall as "one of the last 'free spaces' to do theatre" since the government took control of all other theatres that seat more than 500 people. One of the company's productions of Jesus Christ Superstar in the hall, on March 7, 2010, was attacked as a political campaign of intimidation against the group by masked assailants with tear gas before the show, harming the actors.

Graduation ceremonies for both UCV and other universities are held in the hall, though to some controversy, with citizens and students saying that the use of the hall should be limited to performances and for the traditional ceremony of UCV students only. In 2018, one student political party described the leasing of the hall to another university "commercialisation" of the heritage site.

The hall is also used for student addresses, and in February 2019 the hall was used by then-UCV student president Rafaela Requesens when rallying students to participate in protests during the 2019 Venezuelan presidential crisis. She opened her speech by describing the hall, saying "This is a space of ideas, of knowledge, of plurality of thought, of freedom, of democracy, of justice. Young people always give a message of hope, today of reflection."

== Preservation ==
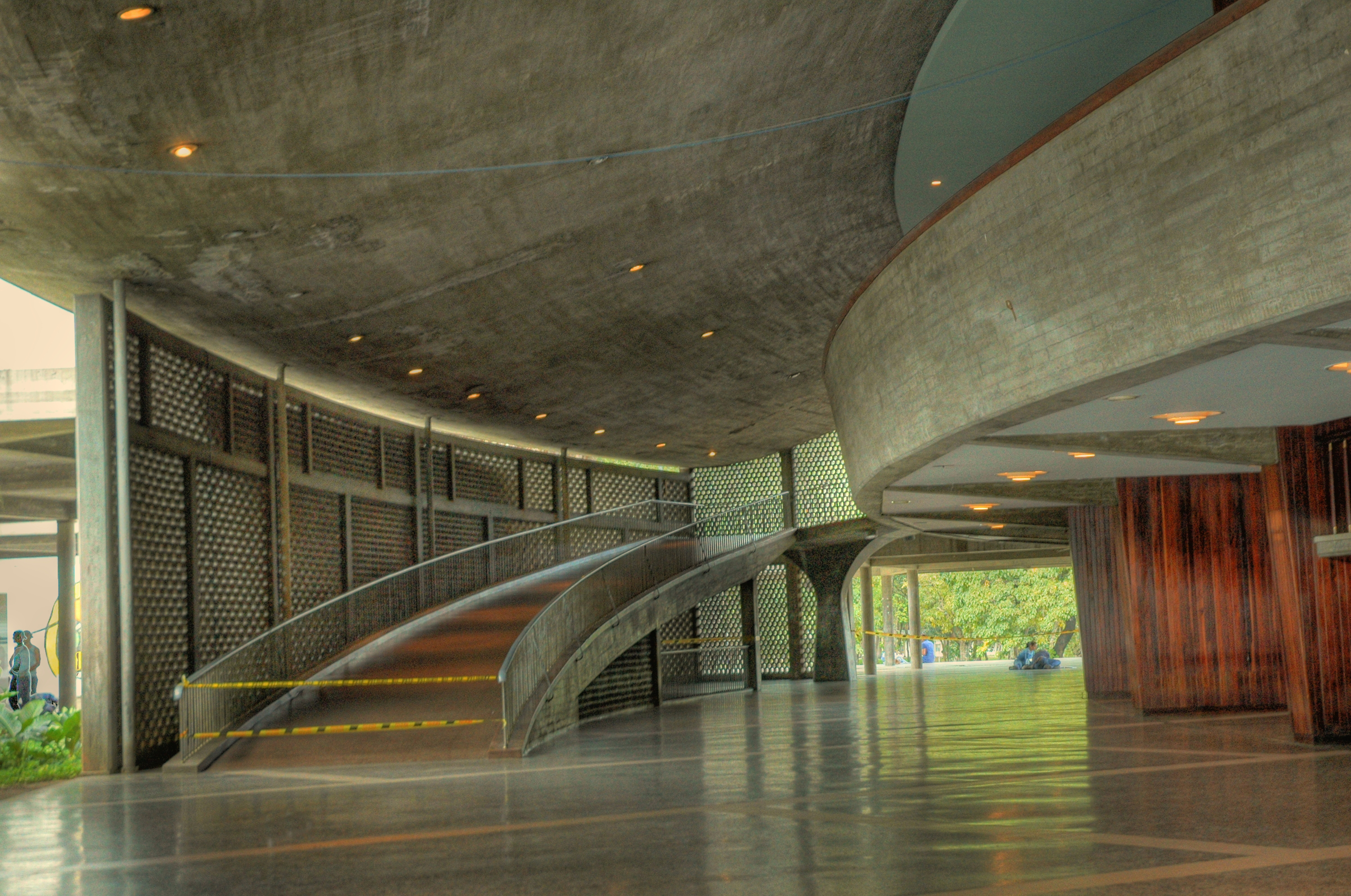
The hallways and lobby closed for cleaning after violence in January 2009

Almost fifty years after its construction, the Aula Magna was designated as a UNESCO World Heritage Site in the year 2000 — as part of the central campus area but also with special consideration for the interior of the hall, which individually has protected status. UNESCO had several concerns about the preservation of the hall, as well as the rest of the campus, due to the growing number of students, the age of the mosaics and concrete, and the area being "vulnerable to social unrest". It did ensure that a "monitoring program" was in place to help protect the site. This monitoring program is called Copred, and is made up of student volunteers and preservation experts.

UNESCO's fears were subsequently realized; during a protest in July 2013 a bus was set on fire within the square outside the hall and damaged one of the adjacent murals, an iconic piece by Venezuelan Oswaldo Vigas. Students and Copred opened a campaign, UCV SOS, and managed to raise money to restore it, with donors including Banco Mercantil and Telefónica. However, it has been said by the Financial Times that restricted funds are a greater threat to the preservation of the hall and artworks, both from the economic downturn due to the Crisis in Bolivarian Venezuela and from the Chávez and then Maduro governments defunding universities and not prioritizing independent culture. Despite these setbacks, in 2015 an art historian and industrial designer noted that the hall "has withstood time and the general negligence that has taken over the majority of the university campus". Copred regularly lead guided tours around the hall in order to raise money for its preservation.

In 2015, it was estimated that the cost of restoring the Aula Magna alone was, in US dollars, $392,919 at the official rate of the time, or $2,943 on the black market. Cecilia García Arocha, the UCV rector, said that since being made a World Heritage Site there had been no funds given to the university to maintain it. Only 6% of the university's funds go towards grounds upkeep, which the site is sectioned under. In late 2014, Copred refitted a roof slab of the Plaza Cubierta by the auditorium, which had been damaged on August 11 that year, and waterproofed it at the same time. They also undertook work on a ramp of the hall in December 2014. In late 2017, the organisation reported refitting the pipes of the Aula Magna in the works it was overseeing, as they had not been uncovered before and caused flooding in the hall.

The university also aims to preserve tradition of the hall as well, with sources saying that its "continued reason for being" is to see new generations of students graduate each year.

== See also ==
- University City of Caracas
- Teresa Carreño Cultural Complex — home to another theatre in Caracas with artistic acoustic panelling
