= Richie Ray & Bobby Cruz =

American musical duo formed in 1963

- Origin: New York, United States
- Genres: Salsa, Boogaloo
- Years active: 1964–present
- Members: Richie Ray; Bobby Cruz

Richie Ray & Bobby Cruz are a Puerto Rican musical duo, consisting of Ricardo "Richie" Ray and Roberto "Bobby" Cruz. The duo was formed in 1963 and rose to fame in the mid-1960s. They are one of the most famous interpreters of 'salsa brava' music.

The duo is well known for helping to establish the popularity of salsa music in the 1970s and 1980s. They are also notable for fusing elements of classical music and rock with traditional Latin music. Among their biggest hits were "Richie's Jala Jala", "Agúzate", "El Sonido Bestial", and "Bomba Camará". They are also famous for their Christmas songs "Seis chorreao", "Bomba en Navidad", and "Bella es la Navidad".

The duo was popular from 1965 to 1974 throughout Latin America and the United States, specially in Caribbean countries. In 1974, following a conversion to Evangelicalism and the inclusion of religious themes into their lyrics, the duo's popularity fell. The group continued releasing albums, and broke up in the early 1990s, however they reunited in 1999, and since then they have been touring and releasing new albums.

In November 2006, the Latin Academy of Recording Arts & Sciences gave Richie Ray & Bobby Cruz a Lifetime Achievement Award.

== Discography ==
External audio
- via YouTube
- Mr Trumpet Man; Provided to YouTube by Universal Music Group

This is an almost complete list of albums released by Richie Ray & Bobby Cruz, solo albums by either artist are excluded.

- Ricardo Ray Arrives! (1965) with Bobby Cruz
- On the Scene (1965)
- Ricardo Ray Introduces Bobby Cruz (A Go-Go-Go) (1966)
- 3 Dimensions (1966)
- Se Soltó (On the Loose) (1966)
- Sings For Lovers & Swingers (1967)
- Jala Jala y Boogaloo (1967)
- Jala Jala Boogaloo Volume II (1968)
- Los Durísimos/The Strong Ones (1968)
- Los Diferentes en Puerto Rico (1968)
- Let's Get Down to the Real Nitty Gritty (1968)
- The Best of Ricardo Ray & Bobby Cruz (Alegre, 1969)
- ¡Los Durísimos y Yo! (The Hard Ones and Me!) (1969) with Nydia Caro
- Viva Ricardo (1969)
- Agúzate (1970)
- El Diferente (1970) with Miki Vimari
- In Orbit (1971) with Miki Vimari
- El Bestial Sonido de Ricardo Ray Y Bobby Cruz (1971) with Miki Vimari
- Felices Pascuas (1971)
- Canta Para Ti (1972)
- Ricardo Ray Presenta A La Vimari "Miki Vamari" (1972)
- Jammin' Live (1972)
- 1975 (1974)
- 10 Aniversario (1975)
- Reconstrucción (1976)
- Algo Nuevo (1976)-
- The Best of Ricardo Ray & Bobby Cruz (Vaya, 1977)
- Viven (1977)
- Renovando La Salsa (1979)-
- El Sonido de La Bestia (1980)
- De Nuevo "Los Durisimos" Again (1980)
- Tu Alumbras Mi Ser (1980)-
- Pinturas (1981)
- ¡A Su Nombre Gloria! (1981)-
- Las Aguilas/The Eagles (1982)
- Back to Back (1982)
- Lo Mejor de Richie Ray & Bobby Cruz (1982)-
- Abriendo Surcos (1983)-
- Bobby Cruz 'En Familia' Con Richie Ray (1983)-
- Ricardo Ray & Bobby Cruz Presenta A Cindy "Maravilloso" (1985)
- ¡Más Que Vencedores! (1986)-
- Los Inconfundibles (1987)
- Ricardo Ray: Piano Praise! (1988)
- ¡Admirable! (1989)
- ¡Adelante Juventud! (Con Jeff Morales) (1989)-
- Richie Ray: Angie, Mi Piano y Yo (1992)
- Un Sonido Bestial – El Concierto (1999)
- Mambo Tata (1999) reissue of Sings For Lovers & Swingers
- Bobby Cruz: Voz, Palabra y Júbilo (2000)
- Lo Nuevo y Lo Mejor (2001)-
- Bobby Cruz: Caminando (2002)
- 40 Aniversario en Vivo (2004) 3-CD
- Que Vuelva La Música (2005)
- A Lifetime of Hits... Live at Centro de Bellas Artes, San Juan, Puerto Rico (2006) 2-CD
- Pura Salsa Live (2007)
