= Richie Ray =

American musician

- Also known as: "El Embajador del Piano" (The Piano Ambassador)
- Born: Richard Maldonado Morales; February 15, 1945 (age 81); Brooklyn, New York
- Genre: Salsa
- Occupations: Singer, pianist, music arranger, composer and religious minister
- Instrument: Piano
- Years active: 1965–present

Richard "Richie" Maldonado Morales (born February 15, 1945) is a Nuyorican (a New York-born Puerto Rican) virtuoso pianist, singer, music arranger, composer and religious minister known for his success beginning in 1965 as part of the duo Richie Ray & Bobby Cruz. He is known as "El Embajador del Piano" (The Ambassador of the Piano).

== Early life ==
Ray (birth name: Richard Maldonado Morales) was born in Brooklyn, New York City to Puerto Rican parents in 1945. He had a younger brother, Raymond "Ray" Maldonado (1946-1982), a trumpeter who later performed with him in his early orchestra projects. They lived on Hoyt Street. Ray's father, Pacifico Maldonado, was an accomplished guitarist in his native Bayamón, and as such was the Maldonado family's early musical influence.

Ray's parents had him take piano lessons when he was seven years old. His life-long partnership with Robert "Bobby" Cruz Feliciano started five years later in 1957 when Ray played bass in a group led by Cruz. This combination was the beginning of one of the greatest salsa duos in the salsa music industry.

He graduated from the High School of Performing Arts in 1962 then attended the Brooklyn Conservatory of Music and the Juilliard School of Music. These experiences served to further develop and refine his musical training. In addition, he became well-versed in various Latin music genres which were popular at that time – the guajira, the cha-cha-cha, the bolero and others.

== Musical career ==
Ray left Juilliard in 1963, after just one year. He made this choice so that he could get organized and dedicate himself to his own band. This was a year later that Cruz joined in as the lead vocalist. In 1965, he signed with Fonseca Records and released his debut album, Ricardo Ray Arrives/Comején. The album included the outstanding hit songs "Mambo Jazz", "Comején", "Viva Richie Ray", "El Mulato", "Suavito", "Pa' Chismoso Tú" and the bolero-cha "Si Te Contaran". The famous pair recorded some of their finest work during the period that they were with the Fonseca label.

In 1966, the group switched to the Alegre label, coinciding with the arrival of the boogaloo. Ray recorded nine albums with Alegre. He was a part of Tico/Alegre Records until 1970, and during that time he produce such hits as "Richie's Jala Jala", "Mr. Trumpet Man", "Señor Embajador", "Agúzate" (Gold Record Award winner), "Amparo Arrebato", "Traigo de Todo", and the Spanish version of Claude François's "Comme d'habitude", called "A Mi Manera" in reference to Frank Sinatra's version "My Way". This song went on to be the most radio played Spanish version of "Comme d'habitude" (and so of "My Way") during 1970; the song also won the duo a Gold Record Award.

While with Alegre, Ray also recorded two albums for UA Latino. These included Viva Ricardo and El Diferente (Gold Record Award winner). The band scored a number one hit with the song "Colorín Colorado", while "El Diferente", "Feria En Manizales" and "Ay, Compay!", became number one hits in Latin America.

In 1968, Ray and Cruz had been together professionally for five years, had written most of their songs together, and for the first time in the album Los Durísimos, they shared equal billing in an album cover. This album had such hits as "Agallú", "Pancho Cristal", "Adasa", and "Yo Soy (Babalú)". Since then the band became officially known as Richie Ray and Bobby Cruz.

=== 1970s ===
In 1970, Ray and Cruz left New York and moved to San Juan, Puerto Rico, for professional and personal reasons. They opened a nightclub, but managing it required too much of their time. Shortly after, they decided to sell the establishment to focus on their artistic commitments. That same year, Ray and Cruz signed with the new Vaya Records label, a subsidiary of Fania Records.

In 1971, they released El Bestial Sonido de Ricardo Ray y Bobby Cruz, the first ever release on Vaya Records, and was one of their better albums on that label. The album went gold, and it took them to the top of the charts once again. It included hits such as Joan Manuel Serrat's "Señora", the bolero version of the Gardel/Lepera tango "Volver", and the Rubén Blades composition "Guaguancó Triste", as well as the salsa version of James Taylor's "Fire And Rain". This album also included his most impressive and well-known hit called "Sonido Bestial", which has a Latin-flavoured arrangement of Chopin's Etude Opus 10/No. 12, and is considered a classic masterpiece of salsa music.

In 1974, the dynamic duo won the title "The Kings Of Salsa" at the Coliseo Roberto Clemente in San Juan, Puerto Rico. For a period of 12 hours, 24 bands had competed for the coveted title, and Ray and Cruz emerged triumphant. Contracts started to pour in, requests for interviews and TV appearances, and even movie offers.

== Born-again Christian ==
All of these things spoke of success, but Ray suffered strong emotional problems during this time. The despair he felt led him into alcohol and drug abuse. He felt tormented by his addictions, however, and wanted to change his life.

In August 1975, he surprised many when he announced that he had become a born-again evangelical Christian. The professed experience radically changed his career and life. At first, Cruz refused to accept Ray's change, but within two months Cruz himself became a convert.

In spite of these dramatic changes, Ray & Cruz fans continued to support the duo. The 1976 release of Reconstrucción went "Gold" (their ninth). The album included their smash hit single "Juan En La Ciudad". They followed with Viven in 1977, De Nuevo 'Los Durísimos' Again (1980), and their final release on Vaya Records, Los Inconfundibles (1987), in which Ray and Cruz announced their retirement from Salsa music. All of these were successful releases.

Richie Ray and Bobby Cruz lost most of their fans and found opposition among the members of their own faith when they suggested the idea of Christian salsa. They stood their ground, however, and little by little, they started to regain the confidence of their fans and fellow Christians. They abandoned secular salsa and recorded salsa with a Christian message, reworking many of their worldly hits into religious themes. Some of these include "El Sonido Bestial", "Más Que Vencedores", and "Aguzate". They also created some new ones, like "Los Fariseos", "Timoteo", and "Sipriano"

The sincerity of their Christian beliefs was not just conveyed in their music. Both Ray and Cruz are pastors, and they have founded more than 70 churches throughout Puerto Rico and the United States. In addition, Ray founded the Salvation Records label as an outlet for Christian music. Then, he continued his music career although his long-time friend, Cruz, had retired. During "retirement", however, both Cruz and Ray released albums with previously recorded numbers and with other bands or singers. Richie Ray is now a pastor in Miami under Spring of Life Fellowship.

In 1991, Ray and Cruz reunited for successful concert appearances in San Juan, and again in New York. They reunited again in 1999 for the "Sonido Bestial VIP" concert in the Coliseo Rubén Rodríguez located in Bayamón. The duo sang some of their early hits together along with some of their religious songs, and the concert was recorded live. The outcome was so impressive that they were offered a contract by Universal Records. The recording was selected as one of the best recordings of 1999, and helped bring the pair back into the limelight of the Puerto Rican music scene. The pair has continued to be active in the music scene since.

== Later years ==
In 2000, Ray and Cruz held a series of concerts that were completely sold out at the Antonio Paoli Hall of the Luis A. Ferré Performing Arts Center in San Juan. They were also honored with a National Day of Salsa in Bayamón. In 2002, Richie Ray and Bobby Cruz were inducted into the International Latin Music Hall of Fame.

In 2003, Ray recorded "Al Ritmo del Piano" for Warner Music Latina. Ray and Cruz continue to make appearances in places such as the Copacabana Club in New York. In December 2005, Ray & Cruz released a totally new album under the label "Tropisounds". The album was recorded in Colombia under the musical direction of its producer Diego Galé. "Que Vuelva La Música" has 14 new tracks – "El gallo y La Vaca", "La Bailarina", "Quim Bon Bori", "Vive Contento", "Soy Boricua" and "Va a Llover" among others, are just a few of the titles. The album was an instant hit in Colombia and Latin America. "El gallo y la vaca" (Nov. 25) and "Salsa La Celebracion" (April 7) appeared in the top 100 salsa songs charts in North America through 2006. In 2006, Richie Ray and Bobby Cruz won a Latin-Grammy Award for "Lifetime Achievement". That year, they also recorded a CD and DVD titled "A lifetime of hits" (live at Centro de Bellas Artes, San Juan, Puerto Rico) which was nominated for a Latin Grammy in the "Best Contemporary Tropical Album" category.

Ray currently lives in Florida with his wife Angie Ray and besides being musically active, he is also busy attending the churches which he and Cruz founded in the United States, Caribbean and Latin-America. Ray is still considered along with Eddie Palmieri and Papo Lucca as one of the best and most influential pianists of all time in salsa music. On August 16, 2008, Richie Ray & Bobby Cruz celebrated 45 years in the musical business, with a concert at José Miguel Agrelot Coliseum. Prior to the presentation, the duo noted that the concert would last at least three hours. The duo also expressed that it might be their last "big scale concert".

== Selected discography ==
Fonseca Records	Alegre Records	United Artists Records
Ricardo Ray Arrives/Comején 1965	Se Soltó/On The Loose 1966	Viva Ricardo 1969
On the Scene 1965	Jala Jala y Boogaloo 1967	El Diferente 1970
3 Dimensions 1966	Jala Jala Boogaloo Volume II 1968	
Richie Ray Introducing; Bobby Cruz (A Go-Go-Go) 1966	Los Durísimos/The Strong Ones 1968	
En Fiesta Navideña 1967	Let's Get Down to the Real Nitty Gritty 1968	
	Los Durísimos y Yo (with Nydia Caro) 1969	
	Agúzate 1970	
Vaya Records	Ray & Bo Records	Appearances with Fania All-Stars
El Bestial Sonido 1971	A Su Nombre Gloria 1978	Our Latin Thing 1971; Ahora Vengo Yo
Felices Pascuas 1971	Renovando la Salsa 1979	Live at the Red Garter, Vol. 1 1972 (rec. 1968); Richie's Bag
Jammin' Live 1972	Abriendo Surcos 1983	Fania All Stars at the Cheetah, Vol. 2 1974 (1971); Ahora Vengo Yo
Amor en la Escuela 1974	En Familia 1983	Latin-Soul-Rock 1974; El Ratón
1975 1974	Más Que Vencedores 1984	Live at the Yankee Stadium, Vol. 2 1975; Hermandad Fania
10 Aniversario 1975	Maravilloso 1985	
Reconstrucción 1976	Adelante Juventud 1989	
Viven 1977	Angie, Mi Piano y Yo 1992	
El Sonido de la Bestia 1980		
Las Águilas/The Eagles 1982		
Los Inconfundibles 1987	Releases After the Year 2000	
Voz Palabra y Júbilo 2000 (Rejoice Music) WEA Latina	Lo Nuevo y lo Mejor 2001 (Rejoice Music) WEA Latina	Caminando 2002 (Rejoice Music) WEA Latina
Casa de Alabanza, Vol. 1 2003 (Rejoice Music) WEA Latina	40 Aniversario en Vivo 2004; Combo Records	Que Vuelva la Música 2005; Tropisounds
A Lifetime of Hits... Live at Centro de Bellas Artes, San Juan, Puerto Rico 2006; Tropisounds

== See also ==
- List of Puerto Ricans
