= Trina Medina =

- Born: 28 February 1960; Trina De Los Angeles Sojo Medina, Caracas, Venezuela
- Origin: Venezuela
- Genres: salsa, son
- Occupation(s): Singer, songwriter, music arranger
- Years active: 1995–present
- Labels: Sony BMG
- Website: trinamedina.com.ve

Trina Medina is a Venezuelan Salsa and Son singer, songwriter and music arranger. She wrote the music for the 2007 Venezuelan film Una abuela virgen, the music for the 1999 film At Midnight and a Half and the soundtrack for the film I Like It Like That includes Trina's rendition of Anda Y Camina. She has also played "Felicidad" on the 2004 RCTV drama "Negra consentida". For the last four years she has been Deputy Headteacher of Culture at the Central University of Venezuela (UCV).

Her mother Canelita Medina is also a Venezuelan singer and passed on her talent to Trina. Her father, Alfredo Sojo, was a pianist and died in 1992.

== Biography ==
Her powerful voice placed her at the front of the Venezuelan music scene after acting as a backup singer on music pieces that marked history: alongside Frank Quintero, recording “Mí no tiene con qué”, and alongside Venezuelan Caribbean pop singer/songwriter Yordano with whom she started touring in 1989, recording “Robando Azules”, “Por estas calles y "Madera Fina". In an impromptu musical show with Luis Enrique yand Tony Vega, held in Puerto Rico, the President of Sony BMG Latin America, Ángel Carrasco, proposed a recording contract, and she then became a solo artist in 1995.

Her debut album has sold over 20,000 to date. It was recorded entirely in Puerto Rico, and gained her the respect, not only of the music industry, but also of the public and musics critics. Due to the success of this record, as well as of the single "Entrega" recorded beforehand under the same label, a global sparkling drinks company hired her to be the voice of their Puerto Rican marketing campaign. On accepting this post she decided to release the album in Miami and New York City for the Latin populations. At this time, Trina shared the stage with large orchestras and well-known personalities in New York City, amongst whom were La Orquesta de la luz, El Gran Combo, Ismael Miranda, Cheo Feliciano and Willie Colón.

She spent nine years studying classical harmony, singing, composing, arranging, piano accompaniment. She plays electric bass and percussion (maracas, güiro, chekeres).

Publication year	Títle	Record label
1987	Ahi Viene / Coco y su Sabor Matancero	Combo Records
1989	Imagen Latina / El Trabuco Venezolano	Leon
1990	Finales De Siglo / Yordano	Sonografica
1991	Rumba Cum Laude / La Banda Los Sigilosos	Top Hits
1992	De Sol A Sol / Yordano	Sonografica
1994	I Like It Like That / Sergio George	Sony Music
1995	TRINA MEDINA	Sony Music
1997	ENTREGA	Sony Music
2006	TRINA MEDINA EN VIVO	TM Records
2008	VOCES Y MUSICA DEL ALMA	TM Records
2011	Sono Sono Tite Curet	BPP
2014	Claroscuro	BPP
