= I Like It Like That (film) =

- Theatrical release poster
- Directed by: Darnell Martin
- Written by: Darnell Martin
- Produced by: Ann Carli; Victor De Jesus; Wendy Finerman; Lane Janger; Stephen Lloyd; Diana Phillips; Tracy Leigh Vilar
- Starring: Lauren Velez; Jon Seda; Rita Moreno; Griffin Dunne
- Cinematography: Alexander Gruszynski
- Edited by: Peter C. Frank
- Music by: Sergio George
- Distributed by: Columbia Pictures
- Release date: October 14, 1994
- Running time: 104 minutes
- Country: United States
- Language: English
- Box office: $1.76 million

I Like It Like That is a 1994 American comedy-drama film about the trials and tribulations of a young Puerto Rican couple living in a poverty-stricken New York City neighborhood in the South Bronx. The film stars Lauren Velez, Jon Seda, Lisa Vidal, Griffin Dunne, Jesse Borrego and Rita Moreno, and was written and directed by Darnell Martin who, in her filmmaking debut, became the first African-American female filmmaker to take helm of a film produced by a major film studio.

The film was screened in the Un Certain Regard section at the 1994 Cannes Film Festival.

== Plot ==
Lisette Linares is a young mother of three children and married to Chino, a bicycle messenger. Although he is always reliable as the breadwinner of the family, Chino is having an affair with their lustful neighbor, Magdalena. One summer evening, as a blackout sweeps the neighborhood, Chino gets arrested for looting.

Now faced with the reality of keeping her family together while the main breadwinner is in jail, Lisette, encouraged by her transgender sister Alexis, decides to give her dream of becoming a print model a chance. As she happens to be in the right place at the right time, Lisette lands a job as the personal assistant to a major record label producer, Stephen Price, who is trying to sign a major Latin music group, the Mendez Brothers (played by the real-life group the Barrio Boyzz). Chino is then released from prison by Magdalena and her father. She then claims Chino fathered her son, Ritchie. Lisette hits rock bottom as a result of this and moves in with Alexis. At her new job, while having sex with Price, he answers a number of phone calls, frustrating Lisette. The next day, Chino tries to go back to his job, but he is fired due to his criminal record. Lisette then confronts Chino to prove that she had sex with another man to get even with him.

While Chino is taking the kids out for ice cream, his extremely rebellious son, Li'l Chino, asks if he could buy ice cream, but Chino tells him that he needs to work in order to buy things. His son then shows him money so Chino allows him to buy the ice cream; when Minnie, his younger daughter, notices that he is wearing new sneakers and pants, Chino realizes that his son has become a drug dealer. Chino furiously lashes out at his son, pushing him towards a mural with a picture of his uncle Hector (Chino's brother) on it, who was a police officer killed by a drug dealer. He whips his son in front of the whole block while his son's friends laugh at him. Alexis notices the commotion and tries to stop him.

Alexis then points out that his son is just a little boy and pulls him away, but Li'l Chino runs away. The kids are still laughing and continue to insult Lil' Chino as weak. An infuriated Chino then beats a kid from the crowd and whips him. The drug dealer attempts to draw a gun, but Chino manages to disarm him, while fellow neighbors help Chino whip the boy. Li'l Chino is then found sitting in front of Alexis' apartment door. He tells Lisette that he wants to stay with her, but she rejects him, believing that he will still be disrespectful toward her. Chino then finds Li'l Chino and takes him home. Back at the apartment, Chino and his friend Angel put his and Lisette's youngest son, Pee-Wee, to bed. When Angel reveals that he is Ritchie's actual father, Chino is angered that Magdalena has played him the whole time. Alexis and Lisette have a discussion about the kids, where Alexis points out that Lisette is just like their own estranged mother. She denies this and Alexis changes and leaves to visit their mother.

When Alexis arrives over there, her mother opens the door and reacts disgustedly to Alexis' appearance. Alexis tries her hardest to make amends with her mother; when her father comes out of his room to check on the noise, he reacts with an aggressive look on his face. Back at Alexis' apartment, Lisette hears the door open and notices that Alexis has returned. When Lisette comes to check on Alexis, she notices her face is injured and asks what happened, but Alexis tells her that she was right about their mother still being unsupportive of Alexis' transgender identity.

The next day at work, Price wants to have sex again, but she tries to reject him. He stops when Lisette tells him he's "not a sexual person", and the two begin to argue, which results in her nearly quitting. They resolve to continue their working relationship. Lisette arrives back at the apartment. She tries to talk to her children and asks for their forgiveness, mostly from Li'l Chino, which he does finally give. Chino arrives later from his new job as a security officer. Both discuss the many flaws in their marriage, hash their infidelities out, and Chino finally tells Lisette the truth about Magdalena's baby daddy. The scene ends with Lisette throwing a pillow at Chino, saying that he never thinks about "the other person", to which he then puts the pillow back under her head and replies, "Good night, other person", despite it being morning already. Lisette lies on the sofa with a smile on her face.

In a mid-credits scene, Lisette, Chino, and their children go to Coney Island while the Mendez Brothers film a music video for their cover of "Try A Little Tenderness". Lisette and Chino appear to have reconciled their relationship and are seen riding a Ferris wheel, slow dancing, and falling asleep on the train as the family rides back to the Bronx.

== Cast ==
- Lauren Vélez - Lisette Linares
- Jon Seda - Chino Linares
- Tomas Melly - Li'l Chino Linares
- Desiree Casado - Minnie Linares
- Isaiah Garcia - Pee Wee Linares (as Isiah Garcia)
- Jesse Borrego - Alexis
- Lisa Vidal - Magdalena Soto
- Griffin Dunne - Stephen Price
- Rita Moreno - Rosaria Linares
- Vincent Laresca - Angel
- Elvis Nolasco - Tito (as E.O. Nolasco)
- Sammy Melendez - Victor
- Jose Soto - Chris
- Gloria Irizarry - Mrs. Gonzalez
- Emilio Del Pozo - Mr. Soto
- Daphne Rubin-Vega - Jasmine
- Toukie Smith - Val
- Fat Joe - Biker Inmate
- Luis A. Marrero - Tony Mendez
- Fredy Correa - Ricky Mendez
- Jerry Rivera - Pablo Herrera

== Soundtracks ==
I Like It Like That, Vol. I: Music from the Motion Picture
No.	Title	Writer(s)	Artist	Length
1.	"Try a Little Tenderness"	H. Woods, J. Campbell, R. Connelly	Barrio Boyzz	3:57
2.	"I Like It"	M. Rodriguez, T. Pabon	The Blackout All-Stars	3:47
3.	"Latin Lingo" (Blackout Mix)	L. Muggerud, L. Freese, S. Reyes	Cypress Hill	3:49
4.	"Like Father, Like Son"	R. Rivera, M. Galarza	Main One: The Ghetto Child	5:02
5.	"I'm Tryin' to Tell 'Em"	F. Joe, Diamond D	Fat Joe	3:45
6.	"Come Baby Come"	L. Sharpe, J. Gardner	K7	3:57
7.	"Forever"	R. Clivilles, D. Ramos	C+C Music Factory	4:15
8.	"You Better Change"	L. Vega, T. Davis	The Cover Girls	3:05
9.	"Blackout"	P. Ramirez, R. Gutierrez	A Lighter Shade of Brown	4:46
10.	"Brinquen Salten"	E. France, M. Ruiz	Shabbakan	3:23
11.	"Eres Tu"	E. Rivera Mercado	Jerry Rivera	4:00
12.	"Si Tu No Te Fueras"	J. Gutierrez, N. Frank	Marc Anthony	4:30

I Like It Like That, Vol. II: Music from the Motion Picture
No.	Title	Writer(s)	Artist	Length
1.	"I Like It"	Manny Rodriguez, Tony Pabon	The Blackout All-Stars
2.	"Guajira / Oye Como Va" (Rhythm Mix)	David Brown, José Areas, Rico Reyes / Tito Puente	Julio Iglesias
3.	"Si Tú No Te Fueras"	Jaime Gutierrez, Nelson Frank	Marc Anthony
4.	"Súbeme El Radio"	Manuel Jiminez	Lisa M
5.	"Cali Ají"	Jairo Varela	Grupo Niche
6.	"Anda y Camina"	Sergio George, Trina Medina	Trina Medina
7.	"Cara de Niño"	Roberto Lugo	Jerry Rivera
8.	"Mi Media Mitad"	Gustavo Márquez	Rey Ruiz
9.	"Perdón"	Pedro Flores	Danny Rivera
10.	"Josefina"	Nitch Mosquera	Orquesta Yambao
11.	"Manuel Santillán, El Leon" (Reggae)	Flavio Cianciarulo	Los Fabulosos Cadillacs

== Reception ==
On Rotten Tomatoes the film has an approval rating of 89% based on 70 reviews. The site's critics consensus states, "A richly textured romantic comedy, I Like It Like That draws on a smart script and spirited performances to tell a refreshingly original story."

Roger Ebert gave the film 3 out of 4 stars and said of the film: "I Like It Like That looks more unconventional than it is, but Martin puts a spin on the material with lots of human color and high energy."

The following publications ranked the film in their own year-end lists:

- 9th – Bob Strauss, Los Angeles Daily News
- 10th – Steve Persall, St. Petersburg Times
- 10th – Jonathan Rosenbaum, Chicago Reader
- Top 10 runner-ups (not ranked) – Janet Maslin, The New York Times
- "The second 10" (not ranked) – Sean P. Means, The Salt Lake Tribune
- Top 18 worst (alphabetically listed, not ranked) – Michael Mills, The Palm Beach Post
