= Una abuela virgen =

2007 film

- Screenplay by: Olegario Barrera
- Based on: Rock para una abuela virgen by Rodolfo Santana
- Produced by: Daniela Herrera
- Starring: Daniela Alvarado; Marlene de Andrade; Antonio Delli; Iván Tamayo
- Cinematography: Willie Balcázar
- Edited by: Fermín Branger
- Music by: Trina Medina
- Distributed by: Cines Unidos
- Release date: 2 March 2007 (Venezuela)
- Running time: 92 minutes
- Country: Venezuela
- Language: Spanish

Una abuela virgen (lit. 'A virgin grandmother') is a 2007 Venezuelan comedy film created by Olegario Barrera based on the Venezuelan play Rock para una abuela virgen by Rodolfo Santana. The film is stars Daniela Alvarado as the titular character, along to Marlene de Andrade, Antonio Delli, Iván Tamayo, and Juan Pablo Raba. The plot revolves around Mónica, the granddaughter of Antonieta García, a woman who lives suffers from mistreatment and humiliation by her lover Carlos, after an argument, Carlos dies and Mónica desperate and distraught wants her grandmother to come back to life. And thanks to Alirio Guaramato, a trumpet player, on a stormy night, while Mónica made her wish, Alirio's music makes Antonieta revive.

== Plot ==
Everything happens after a night when the trumpeter Alirio Guaramato (Iván Tamayo), among the ravages of a fierce drunkenness, tries to vent his sorrows by playing his instrument and manages, by accident, to issue the exact note reserved for the cherubs that with the celestial trumpets must resurrect to the dead on Judgment Day. Nature shudders at such an event out of time and place. In the nearby cemetery the seals of a tombstone are broken in the family pantheon of Los García and Antonieta (Daniela Alvarado) is resurrected, who had died at the age of eighty but strangely reappears resurrected in a body of 20 years. Stunned yet, Antonieta decides to look for an address that remains in the inscription of her tombstone and thus arrives at the apartment where lives her granddaughter Mónica (Marlene de Andrade), a single woman of 28 year old. Meanwhile—from above— and sent by the Creator himself, the sullen angel named Jazzaboalnitanken–Jazz for friends–has descended with the mission of restoring at all costs the Universal Order that has been broken.

== Cast ==
- Daniela Alvarado as Antonieta García "La Abuela Virgen"
- Marlene de Andrade as Mónica "La Nieta"
- Antonio Delli as El Ángel
- Iván Tamayo as Alirio Guaramato "El Trompetista"
- Juan Pablo Raba as Carlos "El Amante"
- Carmen Julia Álvarez as Inés
- Carlos Acosta as Comisario Vargas
- Aura Rivas as Alirio's mother
