= Tony Pabón =

American musician

- Born: José Antonio Pabón; March 6, 1939; San Juan, Puerto Rico
- Died: January 21, 2014 (aged 74)
- Genres: Boogaloo; Salsa; Guaracha
- Occupations: Singer; trumpeter; bandleader

Tony Pabón (March 6, 1939 – January 21, 2014) was a singer, trumpeter and bandleader influential in the development of boogaloo, born in San Juan, Puerto Rico and raised in the Bronx, New York City.

His "Pete's Boogaloo", a tribute to Pete Rodriguez was the first boogaloo played on the radio. His other well known tracks included the mambo "El Capitan", on the album La Protesta.

== Discography ==
- Tony Pabon and his All Stars (cover title) – also known as Tony Pabon y sus Estrellas

Songs

- "I Like It Like That"
- "El Capitan"
