= Bobby Cruz =

Puerto Rican musician

- Born: Robert Cruz Ramos; February 2, 1938 (age 88)
- Origin: Hormigueros, Puerto Rico
- Genres: Salsa

Bobby Cruz (born February 2, 1938) is a Puerto Rican salsa singer and religious minister. He was part of the duo Richie Ray & Bobby Cruz. Both Cruz and Ray became religious ministers and as such founded over 70 Christian churches during the period of about 16 years of their music's greatest popularity, before they retired from popular music.

== Early years ==
Cruz (birth name: Robert Cruz Ramos) was born in Hormigueros, Puerto Rico and raised in the humble surroundings on his family's farm; his father was a sugar cane fields worker who later became a workers' union leader. In Cruz's childhood, his parents moved to New York City where he was educated; there he also enjoyed singing; Bobby regarded the legendary Puerto Rican salsa band El Gran Combo's style of music as the most influential in his life.

== Cruz meets Richie Ray ==
In New York in 1964 Bobby Cruz met fellow Puerto Rican multi-instrumentalist Richie Ray and soon joined his orchestra as a back-up singer. In 1968, Cruz was the lead singer on the English-language song "Mr. Trumpet Man" (an attempt to exploit the boogaloo style that had grown popular in New York and other "Latin" (Spanish language) markets).

Between 1965 and 1975, the pairing of Richie Ray and Bobby Cruz had become one of the most popular salsa duets in the world. Ray and Cruz had a considerable influence in the Latino music world just because of four accomplishments:

- Their orchestra's all-trumpet sonora sound, reminiscent of that of the Sonora Matancera, was called by that orchestra's founder Rogelio Martínez as "the best tribute the band ever had."
- Inadvertently, Ray and Cruz misinterpreted a comment by a Venezuelan television announcer during a visit to the country, and popularized the term "salsa" as a result (they thought the announcer's reference to a tomato paste product was a slang reference to their music, and they incorporated it into their act).
- They are partially credited with keeping the Anglo style of Rock n Roll from invading Puerto Rico. At one time, the band's horn section featured an entirely non-Latino lineup. Ray in particular is credited with bringing his classical musical influences to the band's mix, and taking advantage of Cruz's almost-operatic vocal range as a result.
- Cruz is credited for assisting Rubén Blades into getting work at Fania Records. Cruz's band even recorded some of Blades' earliest compositions, particularly "(Yo Soy) Cipriano Armenteros", part of a four-song saga about the fictional character recorded by Ray and Cruz, Ismael Miranda, and Blades himself.

== Gold record awards ==
Ray and Cruz won a total of nine gold record awards during this period with hits such as:

- "Aguzate" (Get Wise);
- "A Mi Manera" (a remake of the French song My Way);
- "Sonido Bestial" (Beastly Sound);
- "Amparo Arrebato"
- "El Diferente" (The Different One), and
- "Mi Bandera" (My Flag, a non-controversial homage to the Puerto Rican flag that has become a patriotic and cultural reference in the country since)

== Return to Puerto Rico ==
In 1970, Cruz and Ray opened a nightclub in San Juan, Puerto Rico. However they found that managing the club required too much of their time as they had a lot of other commitments to attend to and so decided that it would be much better if they sold the nightclub.

In addition to the duets, Cruz also sang solo when in 1972 he recorded Bobby Cruz Canta Para Tí (Bobby Cruz Sings For You), produced by Richie Ray. He also reached No.1 in the Latin Music Hit Charts with "Ya ni te Acuerdas" (You Don't Even Remember).

In 1974, they won first place in the Festival of Orchestras for the composition "La Zafra", whose lyrics describe the struggles of sugar cane workers in western Puerto Rico and elsewhere. Later that year Ray became a Christian convert. Initially Cruz refused to accept his friend's change, however two months' later he himself became a convert.

As an experiment, they recorded what would become their most popular song, the salsa-merengue fusion "Juan en la Ciudad" (Juan in the City), in which Cruz's lyrics narrate the Parable of the Prodigal Son. It became a huge salsa hit in Latino markets in the United States and in Latin America, mostly because of its catchy, danceable refrain/chorus. Two full albums followed with religious-themed songs. "Pa' Atrás y Pa' Atrás" (Backwards and Backwards) was a minor hit at the time.

== Christian salsa ==
The change to a religious focus was not easy and they lost many of their fans and found opposition among the members of their own faith when they suggested the idea of Christian salsa. They stood their ground and little by little they started to regain the confidence of their fans and fellow Christians, when they recorded salsa songs with a religious message. However, so as to concentrate in their religious ministries, Ray and Cruz decided to record one last "secular" salsa song together: "Adios a la Salsa" (Goodbye to Salsa) was a farewell tribute to the style of music which gave them fame and fortune.

Ray and Cruz founded over 70 Christian churches during the time they retired from popular music, which lasted about 16 years. However, hardcore salsa fans constantly pressured them to return to secular work. After considerable reluctance (they feared alienating their religious followers), they gave away to fans' wishes, and played sold-out return concerts in Puerto Rico, Miami and New York, to their own surprise. Even when specifying that these joinings were to be sporadic and occasional, popular demand for their music remained constant; the Ray and Cruz orchestra played to sold-out crowds in the few tours that followed. They changed the lyrics of some of their old songs as to reflect their religious beliefs, particularly their old hits "Agúzate" (where its old santería references gave way to references to the Holy Spirit) and "Lluvia" (where an innocuous reference to a fool getting caught in the rain became a suggesting petition for the listener to convert to Christianity).

In 1996, Cruz published a book titled Cuando era un Niño ("When I was a Child"). In 1999, Richie Ray and Bobby Cruz held a concert in the Rubén Rodríguez Coliseum in Bayamón, where they sang some of their early hits together with some of their religious songs. The result was so impressive that they were offered a contract by Universal Records to record their concerts.

== Later years ==
External audio
- You may listen to Richie Ray and Bobby Cruz's "Mr Trumpet Man" on YouTube

In 2000, Cruz and Ray held a series of concerts that were completely sold out at the Antonio Paoli Hall at the Luis A. Ferre Fine Arts Center in San Juan. They were also the main honorees at the Puerto Rican National Day of Salsa in Bayamón. In 2002, Bobby Cruz and Richie Ray were inducted into the International Latin Music Hall of Fame.

Cruz and Ray currently continue their music and evangelical ministries. Ray occasionally plays Latin jazz as part of experimental musical collective La Orquesta Experimental. Occasionally, they perform "secular" salsa music (mostly in concerts), perhaps with less popularity than in their heyday, but still influencing a new generation of performers.

On April 19, 2008, Bobby Cruz was the pastor who pronounced the marriage vows between Jackie Guerrido and Don Omar in a ceremony held at the Ritz Carlton Hotel of San Juan. On August 16, 2008, Richie Ray & Bobby Cruz celebrated 45 years in the musical business, with a concert at José Miguel Agrelot Coliseum. Prior to the presentation, the duo noted that the concert would last at least three hours. The duo has expressed that this might be their last "big scale concert".

== See also ==
- Puerto Rican songwriters
- List of Puerto Ricans
