= Boogaloo =

Genre of Latin music and dance

- Stylistic origins: Jazz; soul; rhythm and blues; mambo; son cubano
- Cultural origins: 1960s, New York City

Regional scenes
- New York City; Puerto Rico

Boogaloo or bugalú (also: shing-a-ling, Latin boogaloo, Latin R&B) is a modern jazz genre of Latin music and dance which was popular in the United States in the 1960s. Boogaloo originated in New York City mainly by stateside Cubans and Puerto Ricans with African American music influences. The style was a fusion of popular African American jazz, rhythm and blues (R&B) and soul music with mambo and son montuno, with songs in both English and Spanish. The American Bandstand television program introduced the dance and the music to the mainstream American audience. Pete Rodríguez's "I Like It like That" was a famous boogaloo song.

Except for the name, the dance is unrelated to the boogaloo street dance from Oakland, California and the electric boogaloo, a style of dance which developed decades later under the influence of funk music and hip-hop dance.

== History ==
In the 1950s and 1960s, African Americans in the United States listened to various styles of music including rock and roll, jump blues, R&B and doo-wop and jazz. Latinos in New York City shared these tastes, but they also listened to genres like mambo or cha cha chá. There was a mixing of Puerto Ricans, Cubans and African Americans and others in clubs, whose bands tried to find common musical ground. Boogaloo was a result of this search, a marriage of many styles including Cuban son montuno, guaguancó, guajira, guaracha, mambo, and American R&B and soul. Styles like doo wop also left a sizable influence, through Tony Pabón (of the Pete Rodríguez Band), Bobby Marín, King Nando, and Johnny Colon.

Boogaloo has been called by Izzy Sanabria "the greatest potential that Cuban rhythms had to really cross over in terms of music".

Though boogaloo did not become mainstream nationwide until later in the decade, two early Top 20 hits came in 1963: Mongo Santamaría's cover version of the Herbie Hancock's "Watermelon Man" and Ray Barretto's "El Watusi". Inspired by these successes, a number of bands began imitating their infectious rhythms (which were Latinized R&B), intense conga rhythms and clever novelty lyrics. Boogaloo was the only Cuban-style rhythm which occasionally acquired English lyrics. Established Cuban-influenced orchestras also recorded the occasional boogaloo, including Tito Rodríguez, Willie Bobo, Tito Puente and arranger, composer Ray Santos and his orchestra, which recorded "Cindy's Boogaloo" in 1968. Most of the other groups were young musicians – some were teenagers – the Latin Souls, the Lat-Teens, the Latinaires, Pucho & His Latin Soul Brothers, and Joe Bataan.

Use of the term boogaloo in referring to a musical style was probably coined in about 1966 by Richie Ray and Bobby Cruz. The biggest boogaloo hit of the 1960s was "Bang Bang" by the Joe Cuba Sextet, which sold over one million copies in 1966. "El Pito" was another hit by this popular combo. Hits by other groups included Johnny Colón's "Boogaloo Blues", Pete Rodríguez's "I Like It like That", and Héctor Rivera's "At the Party".

The same year as Joe Cuba's pop success, 1966, saw the closing of New York City's Palladium Ballroom, when the venue, the home of big band mambo for years, lost its liquor license. The closing marked the end of mainstream mambo, and boogaloo ruled the Latin charts for several years before salsa began to take over. At the same time, several other rhythmical inventions came to notice: the dengue, the jala-jala and the shing-a-ling were all offshoots of the mambo and chachachá.

The older generation of Latin musicians have been accused of using their influence to repress the young movement, for commercial reasons. There was certainly pressure on booking agents by the established bands. The craze was mostly over by 1970, perhaps because of the hostility of established bands and key booking agents; the reason is uncertain. It had been an intense, if brief, musical movement, and the music is still highly regarded today.

The Latin boogaloo bands were mostly led by young, sometimes even teenage musicians from New York's Puerto Rican community. These included, but weren't limited to, Joe Bataan, Johnny Zamot, Joe Cuba, Bobby Valentín, the Latin Souls, the Lat-Teens, Johnny Colón, and the Latinaires. As such, Latin boogaloo can be seen as "the first Nuyorican music" (René López), and has been called "the greatest potential that (Latinos) had to really cross over in terms of music" (Izzy Sanabria). However, Latino musicians and composers also made a big contribution to doo-wop.

Latin boogaloo also spread throughout the wider Latin music world, especially in Puerto Rico, where top band El Gran Combo released many boogaloos. Latin music scenes in Peru, Colombia, Panama and elsewhere also embraced the boogaloo. Though the dance craze only lasted until 1968/69, Latin boogaloo was popular enough that almost every major and minor Latin dance artist of the time recorded at least a few boogaloos on their albums. That included boogaloos by long-time veteran, mambo-era musicians such as Eddie Palmieri and his "Ay Que Rico" or Tito Puente's "Hit the Bongo".

The boogaloo faded from popularity by the end of 1969.^{p168} What caused the fairly rapid end of the boogaloo's reign is in dispute. According to several sources, jealous older Latin music artists colluded with record labels (in particular, Fania Records), radio DJs, and dance hall promoters to blacklist boogaloo bands from venues and radio. This scenario is explored in the 2016 film We Like It Like That, a documentary on the history of Latin boogaloo. Alternatively, it was a fad that had run out of steam.^{p168} Its demise allowed older musicians to make a comeback on the New York scene. The explosive success of salsa in the early 1970s saw former giants like Puente and the Palmieri Brothers return to the top, while most Latin boogaloo bands went out of business (Joe Bataan being a notable exception).

In the 2000s, Latin boogaloo has seen a resurgence in popularity, with artists like Bataan experiencing renewed interest in their Latin boogaloo output, and new groups emerging to form a Latin boogaloo revival.

In Cali, Colombia, boogaloo, salsa and pachanga are played by disc jockeys like Heynar Alonso and others in FM and AM radio stations and dance clubs.

== Sources ==
- Boggs, Vernon W. (1939–1940) Salsiology (Published by Excelsior Music Pub. Co., 1992) ISBN 0-935016-63-5
- Flores, Juan. From Bomba to Hip-Hop. Columbia University Press, 2000. ISBN 9780231500166
