= List of songs about Puerto Rico =

This article lists songs about Puerto Rico, set there, or named after a location or feature of the island.

- Because Wikipedia is in written rather than audio format, the lyrics and music are usually the most relevant element of each song; so, when adding or editing a song, please list its lyricist(s) and composer(s) if known. When different artists perform what is substantially the same song, please see if there is an existing listing to which other performers can be added, before starting a new listing.

== 0–9 ==
- "100%" by Big Pun featuring Tony Sunshine
- "787" by Ivy Queen

== A ==
- "A Borinquen" by Guillermo Portabales
- "A Forgotten Spot (Olvidado)" by Zion & Lennox, Ivy Queen, De La Ghetto, PJ Sin Suela and Lucecita Benitez
- "A Puerto Rico" by German Rosario
- "Al Ver Sus Campos" by Ray Barretto
- "Alma Boricua" by Zayra Alvarez
- "Almost Like Praying" by Lin-Manuel Miranda and Artists for Puerto Rico
- "Lejos de Ti" by Angel Canales
- "Amanecer Borincano" by Alberto Carrión
- "Amanecer Borincano" by German Rosario
- "Amanecer Borincano" by Lucecita Benítez
- "America" from West Side Story

== B ==
- "Borinquen" by Gilberto Vélez
- "Borinquen" by Charlie López y La Orquesta Nueva Canta and Frankie Ruiz
- "Borinquen" by Joe Valle and César Concepción
- "Borinqueneando" by Ismael Rivera
- "Borinquen Bella" by TNT Band
- "Borinquen (Mi Isla)" by Ervin "El Boricua" Rosario
- "Borinquen Mi Llama" by Louie Ramirez
- "Borinquen Te Quiero" by Willito Otero
- "Borinquen Tienes Montuno" by Ismael Miranda

== C ==
- "Calma" by Pedro Capó
- "Calma (remix)" by Pedro Capó and Farruko

== D ==
- "Desde El Corazón" by Bad Bunny
- "Dejame Soñar" by Tony Vega and Tito Puente
- "De La Calle" by Ivy Queen

== E ==
- "El Amor Puerto Rico" by Orquesta Narvaez
- "El Buen Borincano" by El Gran Combo De Puerto Rico
- "El Buen Borincano" by El Grupo Victoria
- "El Buen Borincano" by Guillermo Portabales
- "El Buen Borincano" by Piro Manitlla y Su Orquesta
- "El Cantar De Los Pinalas" by Pete "El Conde" Rodríguez
- "El Cantar De Un Borincano" by Impacto Crea
- "El Hijo De Borikén" by Los Pleneros De La Cresta
- "El Pio Pio" by Sonora Ponceña
- "El Todopoderoso" by Héctor Lavoe and Willie Colon
- "En Mi Puertorro" by Andy Montañez and Julio Voltio
- "En Mi Viejo San Juan" by Noel Estrada
- "Enamorado De Puerto Rico" by Plenealo
- "Eres Puerto Rico" by José Ceser Sanabria
- "Esos No Son De Auqi" by Myrta Silva
- "Es Puerto Rico" by Bobby Cruz

== G ==
- "Grita Conmigo" by Charlie Cruz

== H ==
- "Honeymoon in Puerto Rico" by Paul Jabara (1979)
- "Hijos del Cañaveral" by Residente

== I ==
- "Isla del Encanto" by Héctor Lavoe
- "Isla del Encanto" by Orquesta Broadway
- "Isla Primorosa" by Tito Allen

== L ==
- "Lamento Borincano" by Daniel Santos
- "Lamento Borincano" by Grupo Afro-Boricua and William Cepeda
- "Lamento Borincano" by Marc Anthony
- "Lamento Borincano" by Rafael Hernández Marín
- "La Fiesta de Pilito" by El Gran Combo de Puerto Rico
- "La Isla Del Encanto" by Celia Cruz and Compay Segundo
- “La Perla” by Calle 13, Rubén Blades and La Chilinga
- "Latin Beat" by Rick Zeno ft. Cindy Laracuente

== M ==
- "Mi Bandera" by Richie Ray & Bobby Cruz
- "Mi Barrio" by Ivy Queen
- "Mi Gente" by Héctor Lavoe
- "Mi Puerto Rico" by Aventura

== P ==
- "Perreando" by Don Omar
- "Plena y Bomba" by Susana Baca and Calle 13
- "Plenarriqueña" by Jennifer López
- "Preciosa" by Daniel Santos
- "Preciosa" by Rafael Hernández Marín
- "Preciosa" by Marc Anthony
- "Pico Pico" by El Gran Combo de Puerto Rico
- "Puerto Rico" by Bobby Caldwell, Marisela, Wilkins, and Michael Sembello
- "Puerto Rico" by Decoupage (1982)
- "Puerto Rico" by Eddie Palmieri
- "Puerto Rico" by Ervin "El Boricua" Rosario
- "Puerto Rico" by Frankie Ruiz
- "Puerto Rico" by Jerry Rivera
- "Puerto Rico" by KAOS
- "Puerto Rico 2006" by Víctor Manuelle and Eddie Palmieri
- "Puerto Rico" by Vaya Con Dios
- "Puerto Rico" by Mvli
- "Puerto Rican Feeling" by Jose Feliciano
- "Puerto Rico" by Frankie Cutlass
- "Puerto Rico te la Dedico" by Daddy Yankee, Yaviah and Notty
- "Puerto Rico" by Lil Uber
- "Puerto Rico Luv" by Kevin Gates

== Q ==
- "Que Bonita Bandera" by Florencio Morales Ramos
- "Que Bonita Bandera" by Two Without Hats
- "Que Lindo Es Mi Puerto Rico" by Ervin "El Boricua" Rosario

== S ==
- "San Juan Sin Ti" by Luis Enrique
- "San Juan Sin Ti" by Diana Vega
- "Se Necesita Un Milagro" by Domingo Quiñones featuring Ivy Queen
- "Seis De Borincano" by Celia Cruz
- "Seis De Borincano" by Ismael River
- "Soñando con Puerto Rico" by Bobby Capó

== T ==
- "Tierra Borincana" by German Rosario
- "The Puerto Rico Song" by Bill Stiteler

== V ==
- "Vamos a Celebrar" by Ivy Queen
- "Vamos de Colores" by Marvin Santiago

== Y ==
- "Yo Te Canto Puerto Rico" by Guillermo Portabales
- "Yo Naci En Puerto Rico" by Héctor Lavoe
