= En mi Viejo San Juan =

1943 song performed by Noel Estrada

- En mi Viejo San Juan

Single by Noel Estrada
- Released: 1943
- Recorded: 1943
- Genre: bolero
- Length: 2:55
- Label: RCA Victor
- Songwriter: Noel Estrada
- Producer: Fernandito Álvarez

"En mi Viejo San Juan" (In my Old San Juan) is a composition by Puerto Rican composer and singer Noel Estrada. Interpreted by numerous singers and translated into various languages, the song is "widely known around the world". There are musical interpretations in German, English and French. Over 1,000 distinct recordings of the song have been made worldwide.

The song was written in 1942 for Estrada's brother who had been deployed to Panama during World War II and was feeling nostalgia for his Puerto Rico motherland. The song has become an anthem of Puerto Rican emigration to New York.

While it was performed by others, it became truly iconic after Daniel Santos, one of Puerto Rico’s most celebrated bolero and plena singers, recorded it. Santos' emotional delivery connected strongly with Puerto Ricans living overseas, and his version helped transform the song into an anthem of nostalgia and patriotism.

== Background ==
The song was first recorded by El Trio Vegabajeño in 1943 under the label RCA Victor and later under Mar-Vela. The song had an immediate impact and many other versions followed. Two later interpretations achieved large popularity as well as measured by radio ratings: those of Manuel Jiménez Quartet (RCA Víctor, 1948) and the one by Joe Valle with Moncho Usera and his orchestra (Seeco, 1949).

== Theme ==
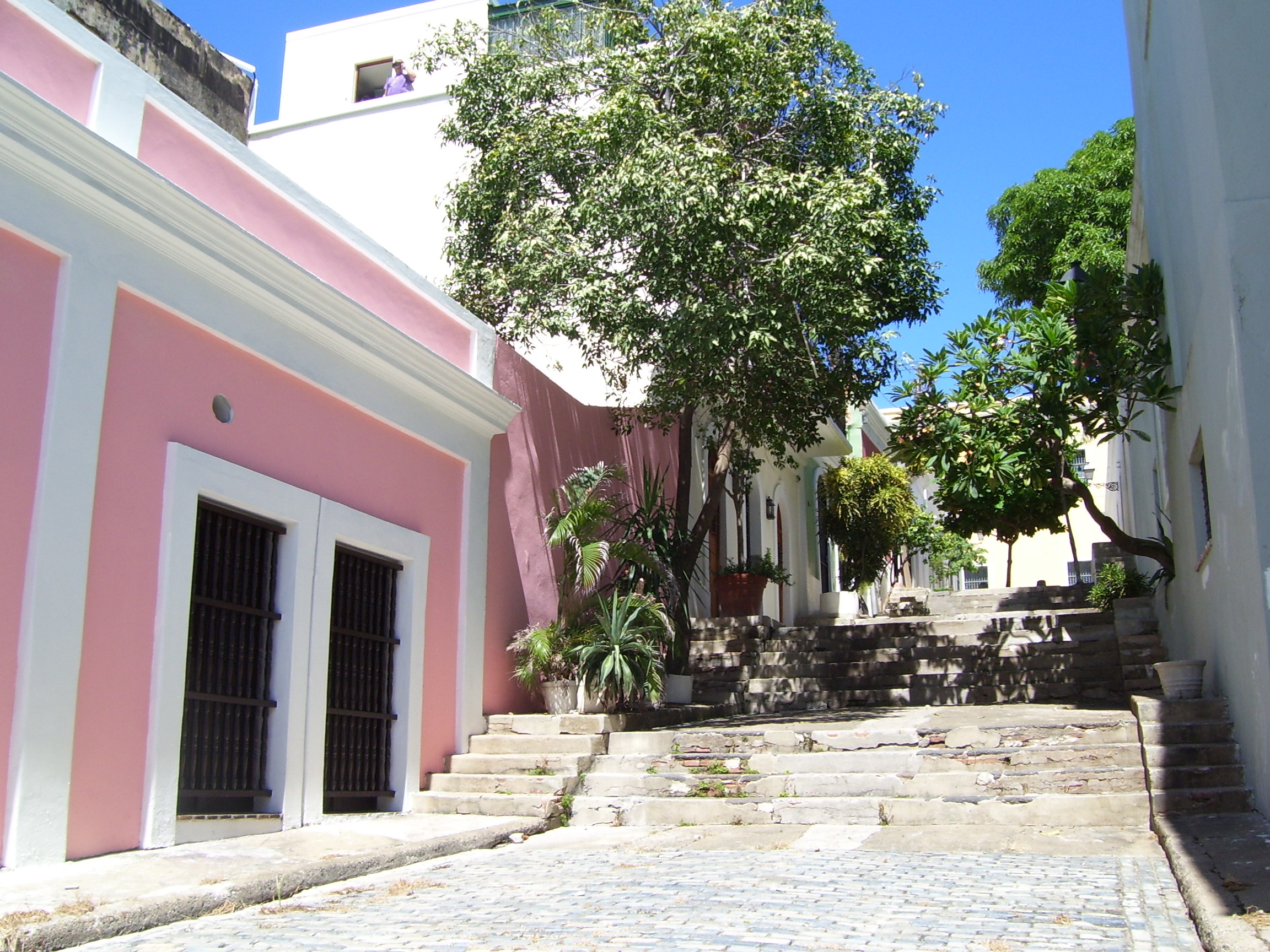
A street scene in Old San Juan, the subject of the song

Trio Vegabajeño "En mi Viejo San Juan"
A 17-second sample for the opening lyrics of the song, "En mi Viejo San Juan" first recorded by Trio Vegabajeño in 1943.

Together with La Borinqueña and Preciosa, "En mi Viejo San Juan" is considered a national anthem by many Puerto Ricans, especially those who live far away from their Caribbean homeland, Puerto Rico. (Note: Ball (2008) "Written during World War II by Noel Estrada, "En mi Viejo San Juan" is one of the most famous ballads of Puerto Rico. The song captures the longing of Puerto Rican emigrants and soldiers for their distant homeland. For many Puerto Ricans, it remains today a kind of second national anthem, and it was adopted as the official city anthem of San Juan.") In this context, the song was put in juxtaposition with Anglo songs including America from West Side Story and America by Neil Diamond. In more general terms, and despite its original military motivation and origins, the song reflects the sentiments of not just Puerto Ricans stationaed abroad as servicemen as was Estrada's brother Eloy Jr., but those of the entire Puerto Rican diaspora as well. By all measures, nevertheless, the song is a reflection of Estrada's "intimate" love connection with his motherland.

== Popularity ==
"En mi Viejo San Juan" is considered a classic and has been performed by numerous artists. Originally interpreted by El Trío Vegabajeño, and made famous by Daniel Santos, the song would later be interpreted by artists like Luis Miguel, Javier Solis,Vikki Carr, Danny Rivera, Marco Antonio Muñiz, Trío Los Panchos, Rafael Cortijo, Ismael Rivera, Celia Cruz, (Note: Ruiz Patton (1998) "She must have known there was a large Puerto Rican population in the audience because she included in her set the song, "En mi Viejo San Juan," "In my Old San Juan." The crowd of about 6,500 went wild, arms in the air, standing and cheering when they heard her begin the song.") and Rocío Dúrcal, plus "hundreds of other voices including Libertad Lamarque, Marco Antonio Muñiz, Ginamaría Hidalgo, and Felipe Pirela. In 1999, Mexican singer-songwriter Marco Antonio Solís performed a live cover of the song during his concert in the Centro de Bellas Artes which was included on his live album En Vivo (2000). His version peaked at number 23 on the Billboard Hot Latin Songs and number eight on the Regional Mexican Airplay charts in the United States. In 2012, American pianist Arthur Hanlon performed a live cover of the song where he was accompanied by Marc Anthony for Hanlon's album Encanto del Caribe (2012). It was presented during the first concert to ever be recorded on the Castillo de San Cristóbal.

The song has also been recorded in at least three other languages in addition to its original Spanish version: English, German, and French. "There are versions in all musical genres, including instrumental, acústico, tango, bolero, ranchera, and even a disco version by Oscar Solo". The song is heard in over 50 Mexican and over 20 Puerto Rican motion pictures, including "Romance en Puerto Rico" (1961) and Antonio Aguilar's "Mi aventura en Puerto Rico" (1975). "En mi Viejo San Juan" has been recorded by American, Russian, German, French, Japanese orchestras, among others. The first known interpretation in French was by the vedette Lolita Cuevas. At least over 1,000 distinct recordings of the song have been made worldwide. The only other boleros to have achieved such popularity are "Obsesión" and "Perdón" (by Pedro Flores) y "Piel canela" (by Bobby Capó) followed by "Desvelo de amor" and "Capullito de alelí" (by Rafael Hernández Marín).

== Legacy ==
In 1971, during the mayoral administration of Carlos Romero Barcelo, the song was adopted as the official city anthem of the City of San Juan. The city of San Juan also passed a resolution making the author of the song (Estrada) an honorary citizen of the city.

The 1988 Tato Laviera's "Mainstream Ethics" poem uses most of the lyrics of En mi Viejo San Juan to depict the Puerto Rican "revolving door" migration motif.

== Recordings ==
Following is a partial list of recordings of the song by year.

- Noel Estrada (RCA Victor, 1943)
- El Trio Vegabajeño (RCA Victor, 1943)
- Daniel Santos (1940's)
- Manuel Jiménez Quartet (RCS Victor, 1948)
- Joe Valle with Moncho Usera and his orchestra (Seeco, 1949)
- Julito Rodríguez y su Trío Los Primos (Ansonia, 1957)
- Ñico & His Latin Brass (Discuba, 1960)
- Cortijo y Su Combo en voz de Ismael Rivera (Gema, 1961)
- Billo's Caracas Boys en voz de José Luis Rodríguez (Velvet, 1964)
- Gilberto Monroig (Borinquen, 1964)
- Leroy Smith & His Melo’stone (Borinquen, 1964)
- Javier Solís (Columbia, 1965)
- Luis Pérez Meza (Musart, 1965)
- Libertad Lamarque (RCA Victor, 1966)
- Sonia La Única (RCA Victor, 1967)
- Juan Legido (Velvet, 1967)
- Felipe Rodríguez "La Voz" y su Trío Los Antares (RCA Victor, 1967)
- Los Chavales de España en voz de Luis Tamayo (Tico, 1967)
- Quetcy Alma Martínez "La Lloroncita" (Pop Art, 1967)
- Leo Marini con la Sonora Matancera (Seeco, 1972)
- Antonio Aguilar (Musart, 1974)
- Ismael Miranda (Fania, 1975)
- Oscar Solo (Borinquen, 1977)
- Francis "El Songo" Santana (Kubaney, 1979)
- Ramoncito Rodríguez y su Trío Los Andinos (Ritmo y Sonido, 1991)
- Prodigio Claudio (Combo, 1991)
- Cuarteto Los Kintos (Disco Hit, 1992)
- Julia Barrera (CR, 1992)
- Ángel Náter y su Orquesta Escambrón en voz de Noel Linares (Oeran, 1995)
- Jimmy Rey (Sonolux, 1997)
- Gerardito Fernández (Sony Latin, 1998)
- Charlie Zaa (Sonolux, 1998)
- José Feliciano (PolyGram Latino, 1999)
- Marco Antonio Solís (Fonovisa Records, 2000)
- Eddie Ricardo (Maci, 2003)
- Lupillo Rivera (Sony Latin, 2004)
- Los Temerarios (Fonovisa Records, 2004)
- Modesto Nieves, virtuoso cuatrista (HCP, 2004)
