= Lamento Borincano =

1929 song performed by Rafael Hernández Marín

Single by Rafael Hernández Marín
- Released: 1929
- Recorded: 1929
- Genre: bolero
- Length: 6:37
- Label: Sony Discos
- Songwriter: Rafael Hernández Marín
- Producer: Fernandito Álvarez

"Lamento Borincano" ('Puerto Rican Lament') is a patriotic composition by Rafael Hernández Marín in honor of Puerto Rico. It takes its name from the free musical form Lament (Latin, lāmentor), and from Borinquen, an indigenous name for the island. Hernández released the song in 1929 to illustrate the economic precariousness that had engulfed the Puerto Rican farmer since the late-1920s' Puerto Rico. It became an instantaneous hit in Puerto Rico and its popularity soon followed in many Latin American countries. Renowned international artists have sung it and featured it in their repertoire.

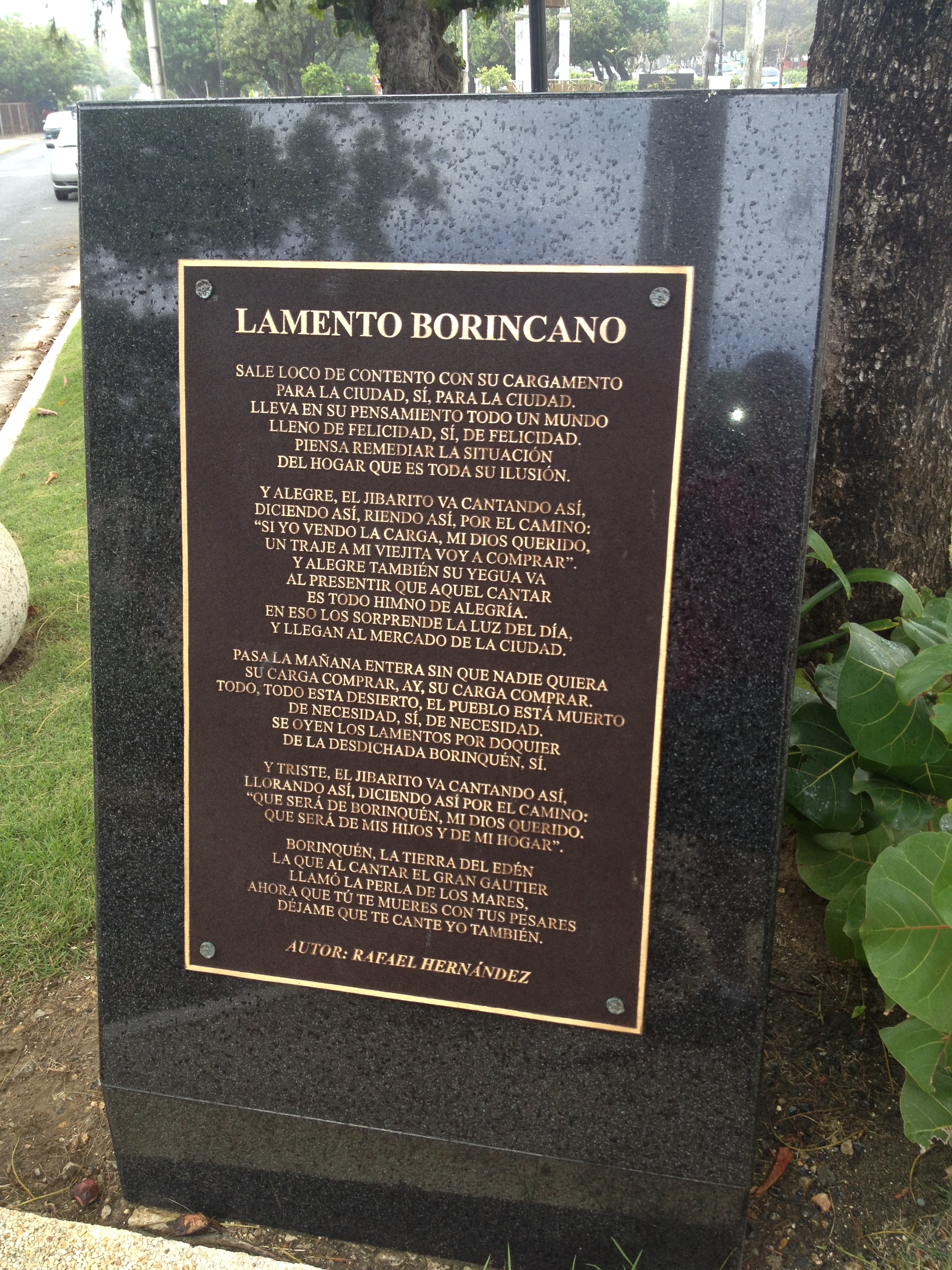
Monument to the "Lamento Borincano," in el Viejo San Juan

In 2018, the original 1930 recording of the song by Canario y Su Grupo was selected for preservation in the National Recording Registry by the Library of Congress as being "culturally, historically, or aesthetically significant".

== History ==
Hernandez composed the song while he lived in New York City, in Spanish Harlem. That same year, he also wrote his masterpiece, "Preciosa". In 1947, Hernández returned to Puerto Rico to become an orchestra director at the government-owned WIPR Radio. "Lamento Borincano" was interpreted by dozens of artists and became an important part of Puerto Rican culture.

In 1929, 17-year-old Davilita met Rafael Hernández by chance. Davilita got along quite well with Hernández Marín and was able to see the unfinished version of Hernandez's "Lamento Borincano". Davilita asked Hernandez if he could record the song, but Hernandez thought that Davilita was too young and declined his request. The song was to be recorded by bandleader Manuel "Canario" Jiménez and his band. A musician named Ramon Quiroz became ill on the day of the recording, so Davilita ended up as lead vocals, with Fausto Delgado on backup.

== Theme ==
The song reflects the economic situation of the poor farmers in the Puerto Rico of the 1920s leading to the Great Depression. The song starts with a cheerful and optimistic tone, presenting the jibarito. The jibarito (diminutive of jíbaro) is a self-subsistence farmer and descendant of the intermixing of Taíno and Spaniards during the 16th century, who is the iconic reflection of the Puerto Rican people of the day. The jibarito was a farmer-salesman who would also grow enough crops to sell in the town in order to purchase clothing and other goods for his family. The song speaks of the jibarito walking with his mare loaded with fruits and vegetables from his plot of land and heading to town to sell his load, but, disappointed to see the poverty prevalent even in town and unable to sell his load, the jibarito returns home with his load unsold. The song thus ends with a sad, melancholic tone. The song does not name Puerto Rico by its modern name, instead using its former pre-Columbian name, Borinquen.

== Chorus ==
The chorus reads,

¡Borinquen! La tierra del Edén
La que al cantar, el gran Gautier
Llamó la Perla de los Mares,
Ahora que tú te mueres con tus pesares,
Déjame que te cante yo también.

Translation:

Borinquen! The land of the Eden
The one when he sang, the great Gautier
Called the Pearl of the Seas
Now that you lay dying from your sorrows
Let me sing to you, me as well

Though Rafael Hernández names the Puerto Rican poet José Gautier Benítez, some artists who have recorded the song have replaced his name with the word Gotier in place of Gautier.

== Recordings ==
External audio
- You may listen to Luciano Quiñones piano interpretation of Hernandez' "Lamento Borincano" here

Following is a partial listing of recordings of the song by different artists.

- Marco Antonio Muñiz. Los Grandes Exitos de Marco Antonio Muñiz (RCA International, 1983)
- Gilberto Monroig. Grandes Compositores, Rafael Hernandez: Volumen 3 (Polygram Records, 1994)
- Javier Solís. Personalidad: 20 Exitos (Sony Discos, 2002)
- Alfonso Ortiz Tirado. Original version of the song that became an immediate hit
- Paco de Lucía (duet with Ramón de Algeciras). En Hispanoamérica
- Chavela Vargas
- Franck Pourcel. Instrumental
- Banda Los Escamilla. Album: La Consentida (2004)
- Conjunto Primavera
- Caetano Veloso
- Ginamaria Hidalgo
- Chelito de Castro (with Juan Carlos Coronel)
- Alfredo Kraus
- Plácido Domingo
- Óscar Chávez
- Pedro Infante
- Roberto Torres
- Toña la Negra
- Víctor Jara (Canto libre, 1970)
- Daniel Santos
- Estela Raval y Los 5 Latinos
- Radio Pirata Version Rock
- Marc Anthony (Valió la Pena, 2004)
- Los Indios Tabajaras Instrumental
- Leo Marini
- Facundo Cabral
- Pedro Vargas
- La Lupe (with Tito Puente)
- Los Panchos
- José Feliciano (with Luis Fonsi) (José Feliciano y Amigos, 2006)
- Enrique Cardenas Instrumental
- Marc Anthony, Ednita Nazario, Gilberto Santa Rosa and Ruth Fernández in the Banco Popular de Puerto Rico special, "Romance del Cumbanchero".
- Edith Márquez
- Ainhoa Arteta
- Cuco Sánchez
- Carlo Buti
- Luciano Tajoli
- William Cepeda Version Bomba
- Las Acevedo, a Tribute to Chavela Vargas La Chamana.
- Trio Los Andinos with Carmin Vega in "Los Andinos: Homenaje a Rafael Hernandez, con Carmin Vega". (2003, Disco Hit Productions)

== See also ==
- Puerto Rican Poetry
- List of Puerto Ricans
- List of songs about Puerto Rico
