= Bobby Capó =

Puerto Rican singer (1922–1989)

- Born: January 1, 1922; Coamo, Puerto Rico
- Died: December 18, 1989 (aged 67); New York City, U.S.
- Occupations: Singer, songwriter, composer
- Spouse(s): Irma Nydia Vázquez; María De Gloria de Oliveira
- Children: 6

Félix Manuel "Bobby" Rodríguez Capó (January 1, 1922 – December 18, 1989) was a Puerto Rican singer and songwriter. He usually combined ballads with classical music and was deeply involved in Puerto Rican folk elements and even Andalusian music, as to produce many memorable Latino pop songs which featured elaborate, dramatic lyrics.

== Early life ==
Félix Manuel Rodríguez Capó was born in the barrio of Pedro García in Coamo, Puerto Rico to Celso Quiterio Rodríguez Rivera, a salesman, and Arsenia Capó Canevaro, a housekeeper. He adopted "Bobby" as his first name and, as Rodríguez is a common Hispanic surname, he reportedly opted to use his mother's less common one, Capó, instead.

== Career ==
Capó moved to New York City early in the 1940s. Initially, he replaced Pedro Ortiz Dávila, "Davilita", in a quartet, the Cuarteto Victoria of Rafael Hernández Marín. He then joined Xavier Cugat's orchestra.

Apart from his work as a singer, he was also a television host, as well as technical and musical director, and prolific songwriter. He wrote songs for many of his contemporaries. Many of these became hits in Puerto Rico, and occasionally in the rest of Latin America. One of his self-penned songs was "El Negro Bembón", a hit for Cortijo y su Combo in the mid-1950s. The song, with local circumstances and character name changed, became "El Gitano Antón", a huge hit for Catalan rumba singer Peret in Spain around the mid-1960s. Bobby Capó wrote the score and songs for the movie MARUJA that was filmed at the end of the 1950s in Puerto Rico.

Capó's "Sin Fe" ("Without Faith"), sometimes known as "Poquita Fe" ("Little Faith"), became a proper hit in Puerto Rico when recorded by Felipe Rodríguez in the mid-1950s, and a huge international hit for José Feliciano in the mid-1960s. Capó's composition describing his homesickness for Puerto Rico, "Soñando con Puerto Rico" (Dreaming of Puerto Rico), is revered as an anthem by Puerto Ricans residing abroad. Another of his songs, "De Las Montañas Venimos", is a Christmas standard in Puerto Rico.

His best-known song is "Piel Canela" (whose title literally translates to "Cinnamon Skin"). He wrote and recorded an English-language version, "You, Too", which he most notably recorded in Havana at the request of Rogelio Martínez of Sonora Matancera, who asked him to sing pieces of his recently composed songs with his band. Josephine Baker recorded a version in French. The song became the main theme for a Mexican movie of the same name in the late 1950s. So was "Luna de Miel en Puerto Rico" ("Puerto Rican Honeymoon"), a latter-day chachachá which was the theme for an eponymous movie, co-produced by Mexicans and Puerto Ricans in the early 1960s.

In the early 1970s, Bobby Capó worked for the Puerto Rican government as the Ambassador of the Puerto Rican Consulate Embassy located on Park Avenue and 23rd Street in New York City. In later years, Bobby Capó later worked for the Department of Labor's Division of Migration.

In 2000 he was posthumously inducted into the International Latin Music Hall of Fame.

== Personal life ==
In 1944, he married Mercedes Ramos, and after their divorce, in 1948 Capó married Irma Nydia Vázquez, his second wife and the first Miss Puerto Rico to participate in the Miss America pageant and the daughter of a wealthy Puerto Rican industrialist. The marriage was frowned upon by her family, and he wrote: "El Bardo" ("The Bard") inspired by this issue. "El Bardo" tells of a pauper who died heartbroken after his wealthy love prospect marries another man, and finishes up with her (also heartbroken) reaction to his death. The song was a huge hit for Felipe Rodríguez in the early 1950s and has been covered by many others. Capo had six children: Félix Manuel Rodríguez (musician Bobby Capo Jr, father of Pedro Capó), Irma "Mimi" Rodríguez López, Soraya Rodríguez, Waldo Rodríguez, Jacqueline Rodríguez (also a singer) and Zahera Rodríguez.

== Death ==
Bobby Capó died at the age of 67, on December 18, 1989, at his New York City home of a heart attack, several weeks before what would have been his 68th birthday. He was buried at the Coamo Municipal Cemetery in Coamo, Puerto Rico.

== See also ==
- List of Puerto Rican songwriters
