= Teatro Puerto Rico =

Former music hall in New York City

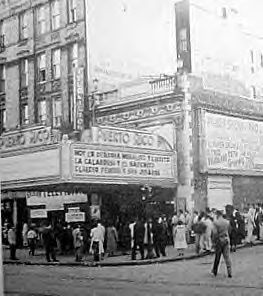
- Teatro Puerto Rico in the 1950s
- Interactive map of Teatro Puerto Rico
- Location: 490 East 138th Street (at Brook Avenue); Mott Haven, Bronx, New York City
- Coordinates: 40.807801°N 73.919209°W
- Owner: Ansel family
- Capacity: 2,300
- Type: Indoor theatre

Construction
- Opened: February 1923
- Closed: 1996

The Teatro Puerto Rico was a music hall focused on the Latino community in the Mott Haven neighborhood of the South Bronx in New York City. During the 1940s to 1950s it presented la farándula, a vaudeville-style package of Spanish-language events, and attracted entertainers from all over Latin America. In the late 1960s, the neighborhood where the theater was located was in decline and the theater closed its doors until 1994. That year a real estate developer invested funds in renovations. After two years in operation, a political scandal involving misappropriated public funds forced the permanent closure of the theater. The building which the theater once occupied is now used as a place of religious worship.

== Historical background ==
Located at 490 East 138th Street (the corner of E. 138th & Brown Place) in the Mott Haven section of the Bronx, the theater was built in 1917. It opened its doors in February 1923, under the name of the Forum Theater. The theater, which had 2,300 seats, was a popular gathering spot which provided vaudeville shows and later movies, first for the German immigrant families who lived in the area and then for the Irish and Italian families who came after them. The Forum Theater, which was owned by the Ansel family, struggled to survive and compete with the arrival of the larger modern movie theaters such as Loew's and RKO.

== "The Great Puerto Rican Migration" ==
Three factors contributed and led to what became known as "The Great Puerto Rican Migration" to New York. These were the Great Depression, World War II, and the advent of air travel. The Great Depression which spread throughout the world was also felt in Puerto Rico. Since the island's economy had been made dependent on that of the United States, the U.S. economic crisis was felt on the island, as well. Unemployment rose steeply and, consequently, many families fled to the U.S. mainland in search of jobs.

The outbreak of World War II opened the doors to many of the migrants who were searching for jobs. Since a large portion of the male population of the U.S. was sent to war, there was a sudden need of manpower to fulfill the jobs left behind. Puerto Ricans, both male and female, found themselves employed in factories and ship docks, producing both domestic and warfare goods. The new migrants gained the knowledge and working skills which in the future would serve them well. The military also provided a steady source of income.

The advent of air travel provided Puerto Ricans with an affordable and faster way of travel to New York. A common denominator amongst all the migrants was their desire for a better way of life than was available in Puerto Rico. Although each one held personal reasons for migrating, the decision was generally rooted in the island's impoverished conditions, as well as the public policies that sanctioned migration.

It wasn't long before the Puerto Rican barrios in the South Bronx, Spanish Harlem, Manhattan's Lower East Side and Brooklyn's Atlantic Avenue began to resemble "Little Puerto Rico's" with their bodegas (small grocery stores) and piragueros (Puerto Rican shaved ice vendors) in every corner. It is estimated that from 1946 to 1950 there were 31,000 Puerto Rican migrants in New York.

== "Teatro Puerto Rico" ==
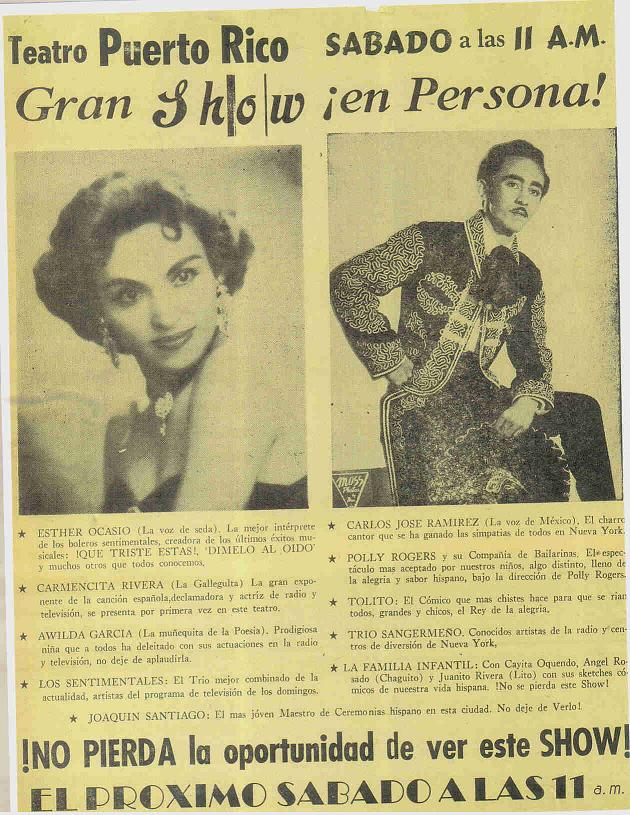
Teatro Puerto Rico Flyer - 1956

Puerto Rican music flourished with the likes of Rafael Hernández and Pedro Flores, who formed the Trio Borincano and gained recognition in the city. Myrta Silva, who later joined Hernandez's Cuarteto Victoria, also gained fame as a singer after the group traveled and played throughout the United States.

Like other newcomers before them, the Bronx's newly arrived Latinos converted existing theaters for their own use. The South Bronx became a hub for Puerto Rican music. Theaters which served previous groups of immigrants, such as the Irish and the Italians, to stage their dramatic works or vaudeville style shows, now served the growing Puerto Rican population with musical performances from musicians throughout the island.

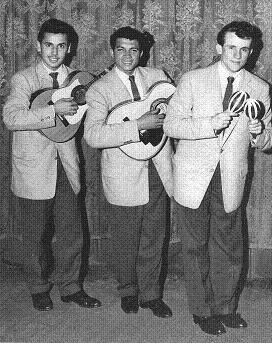
Trio Los Duques performing at Teatro Puerto Rico in 1955 Juan Sotomayor, Filo Del Moral and Vitin Pagán

In 1948, the Forum Theater (briefly named the Brook Theater) was renamed Teatro Puerto Rico and began presenting Hispanic stage shows that attracted patronage from all over the Greater New York area. It was not just the main concert spot for Latino performers in New York, attracting stars from all parts of Latin America, it was one of the few places where Puerto Rican families from all over New York City could gather to celebrate their culture.

Among those who entertained the crowds with their "Cuatros" and interpretation of the island's "jibaro" music (typical country music) were Florencio Morales "Ramito" Ramos, Jesús Sanchez "Chuito de Bayamon" Erazo, Pedro Ortiz "Davilita" Davila and Tomas "Maso" Rivera. Acts by Tito Rodríguez and his band and from trios such as Trio Los Duques, Trio Borincano, Los Panchos, and Vegabajeño were often seen. Shows by Felipe "La Voz" Rodríguez, a singer of boleros, were in much demand and sell outs. Two child prodigy performers who made their debuts in the Teatro were, José Feliciano, whose family moved from Lares, Puerto Rico, to El Barrio in 1950, got his start when he debuted at the Teatro Puerto Rico in 1954 at the age of nine and Miguel Poventud "El Nino Prodigio de Guayama".

During the Christmas season, shows featuring la música jíbara were offered. The Teatro also presented a children's talent show called Fiesta Infantil con Joaquín Santiago directed by the theater's MC, in which parents were encouraged to bring their children as participants. In the winter of 1953, Ramón "Diplo" Rivero and his troupe traveled to New York City to perform before the Puerto Rican community and for three weeks Rivero and his show "El Tremendo Hotel" held sell out performances at the teatro.

== International entertainment ==
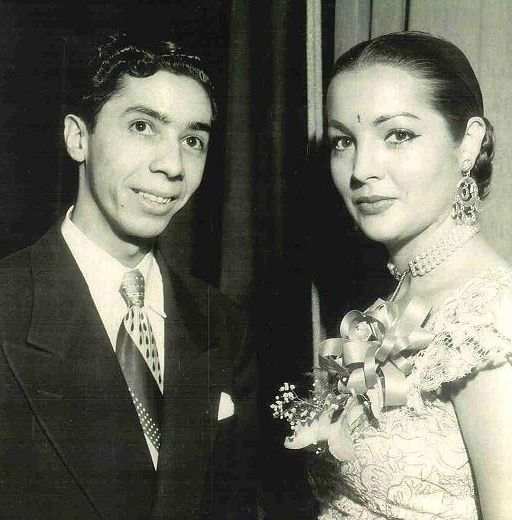
MC Joaquin Santiago with Sara Montiel

The Teatro Puerto Rico soon began to feature one or two Spanish-language films (primarily Mexican) a week with a featured star attraction, attracting patronage from non-Puerto Rican Latinos all over the Greater New York area. As a consequence, Carlos Montalban, the older brother of actor Ricardo Montalbán, who had connections in Hollywood was contracted to bring Mexican entertainers and cinema celebrities who were shown in the movies. Among those who were contracted for comedy skits or to talk about their lives and careers were Cesar Romero, Mario "Cantinflas" Moreno, Jorge Negrete and Pedro Infante. Miguel Poventud often participated in comedy sketches with Mexican comedian Germán Valdés also known as "Tin Tan". Among the international singers and actresses who headlined at the teatro were Spain's Sara Montiel and Argentina's Libertad Lamarque. In 1949, Lamarque's gross profits of her show for one week came in third place after two Broadway Musicals, "Kiss Me, Kate" and "As the Girls Go".

== The decline in the 1960s ==
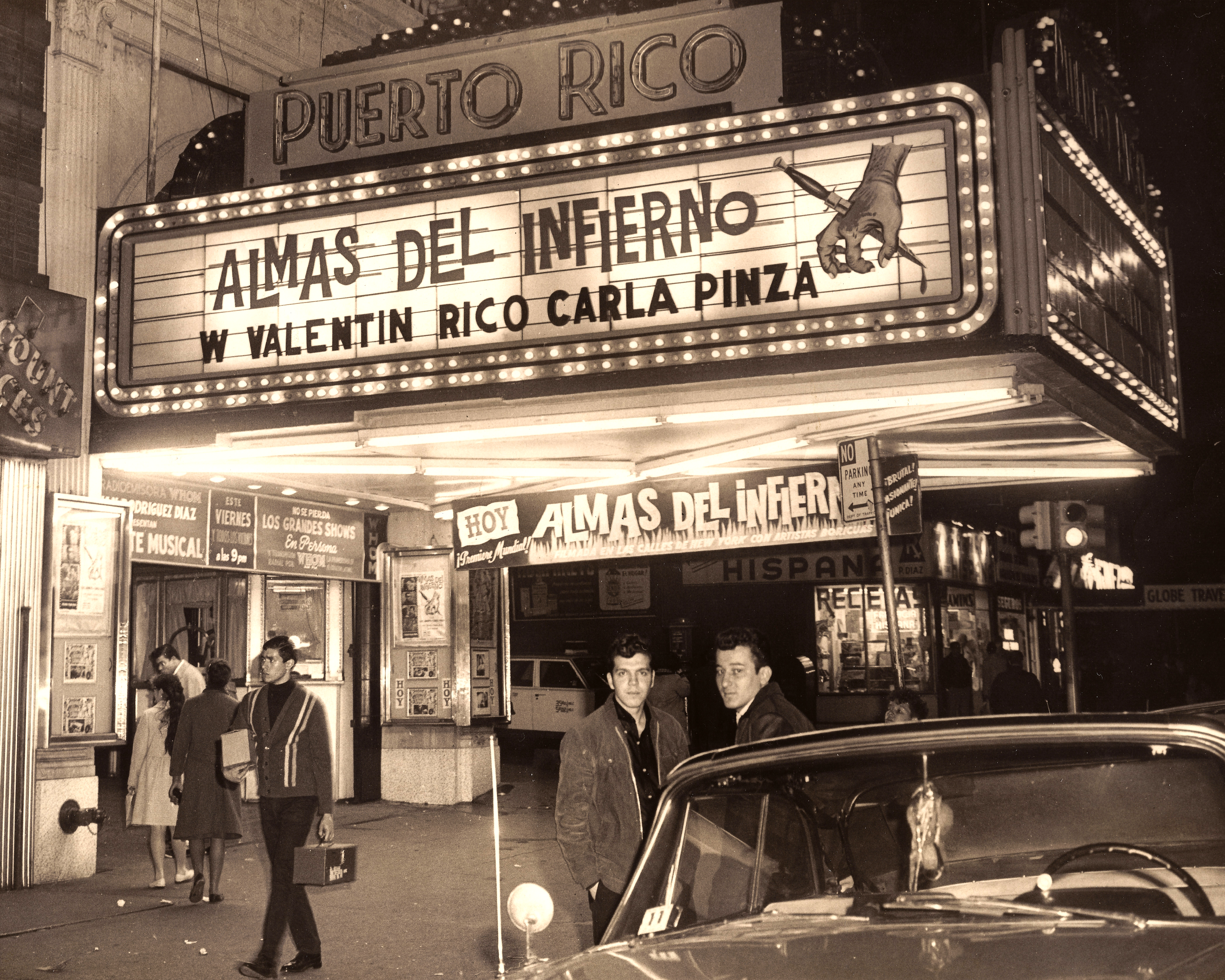
Teatro Puerto Rico marquee, promoting "Almas del Infierno," starring William Valentin Rico and Carla Pinza, directed by Anthony Felton, and released in 1966.

During the 1960s, the growing Puerto Rican and Latino population was entertained not only by the performances of musicians from Puerto Rico and Cuba, but also from the local Bronx's burgeoning second generation Latino American musicians whose music and styles were influenced by the local nation musical trends. Musicians such as Tito Puente, Vicentico Valdés, Marcelino Guerra, Machito, Arsenio Rodríguez, Charlie and Eddie Palmieri, Orlando Marin, Manny Oquendo, Ray Barretto, Barry Rogers, Johnny Pacheco, Joe Loco, Joe Quijano, Willie Colón and Héctor Lavoe performed at the Teatro.

In the late 1960s, the neighborhood went into decline and theTeatro could no longer compete with larger theaters in contracting performers. For a brief period theTeatro presented live wrestling matches; however, attendance at the Teatro Puerto Rico continued to drop and it closed its doors in the late 1970s. Mr. James Sanchez, a real estate developer, invested $1.2 million and in 1987, after two years of renovations, Teatro Puerto Rico opened its doors once again as a performing arts center for the Hispanic community. The auditorium was divided into three sections, two for "live" performances and one for showing the latest Hollywood movies with Spanish subtitles.

In 1996 the owner rented the theater to New York State Senator Pedro Espada. Six months later the Teatro finally closed its doors indefinitely after the senator failed to pay its rent. As a consequence, the senator was evicted and pleaded guilty to using false information to win a $95,000 state grant, which was supposed to pay the Teatro Puerto Rico's $10,000-per-month rent.

== Later years ==
After the scandal the owner decided to put the building up for sale. Teatro Puerto Rico was sold, to "Iglesia Universal del Reino de Dios" (Universal Church of the Kingdom of God). Which has converted a portion of the theater into a television and radio station. The legacy of the Teatro Puerto Rico continues to live on at the church, which presents Latin gospel music, with full jazz bands on its stage on Sundays.

== See also ==
- List of Puerto Ricans
