= Preciosa (song) =

Patriotic composition by Puerto Rican composer Rafael Hernández Marín

Single by Rafael Hernández Marín
- Released: 1937
- Recorded: 1937
- Genre: Bolero
- Length: 3:36
- Label: Sony Discos
- Songwriter: Rafael Hernández Marín

"Preciosa" (English: Precious) is a 1937 patriotic composition by Puerto Rican composer Rafael Hernández Marín.

== History ==
In 1937, Hernández Marin wrote "Preciosa", while in Mexico. Years later, in 1947, he returned to Puerto Rico and became orchestra director at the government-owned WIPR Radio. His music became an important part of Puerto Rican culture. Hernandez formed Cuarteto Victoria (Victoria Quartet) with Pedro Ortiz Dávila, Rafael Rodríguez, and Francisco López Cruz with whom he recorded the song. A Puerto Rican group led by Manuel A. Jiménez (“Canario”) recorded Hernández's Preciosa, which, together with Lamento Borincano became unofficial national anthems of Puerto Rico.

== Theme ==
Preciosa expresses feelings of love and nostalgia for Puerto Rico. It is considered one of the unofficial National Anthems of Puerto Rico The work includes a celebration of the three historical sociological traits that Puerto Ricans attribute to making their current culture and nationalism; the blend of Spanish, African and Taino. The song makes reference to a tyrant who mistreats Puerto Rico and the song became an expression of autonomist patriotism. However, all Puerto Ricans, regardless of their personal beliefs towards the political status of the island, celebrate when hearing the song.

== Recordings ==
Following is a partial listing of recordings of the song by artists, alphabetically (incomplete).

- Marc Anthony Romance Del Cumbanchero – La Musica de Rafael Hernández. Banco Popular. 1998.
- Cécilia Cara
- Vicente Fernández
- Rafael Hernandez Marin
- Joe Valle. Lo Mejor de Rafael Hernandez. Fania Records. 2012.
- Trio Los Andinos with Carmin Vega in "Los Andinos: Homenaje a Rafael Hernandez, con Carmin Vega". (2003, Disco Hit Productions)
- Trio Voces de Puerto Rico
- Joselito En la pelicula Joselito vagabundo AKA "El Falso Heredero"

== See also ==
- Puerto Rican Poetry
- List of Puerto Ricans
- List of songs about Puerto Rico
