= En Vivo (Marco Antonio Solís album) =

Live album by Marco Antonio Solís
- Released: October 30, 2000
- Recorded: El Teatro de Bellas Artes, Puerto Rico, March 21, 1999
- Genre: Norteño, mariachi, Pop Latino
- Length: 43:10
- Label: Fonovisa

Marco Antonio Solís chronology
Los Grandes Éxitos de Marco Antonio Solís y Los Bukis: Recuerdos, Tristeza y Soledad (1998)	En Vivo (2000)	En Vivo, Vol. 2 (2001)

En Vivo (Eng.: Live) is the first live album released by Marco Antonio Solís from El Teatro de Bellas Artes Puerto Rico on October 30, 2000.

== Track listing ==
All songs written and composed by Marco Antonio Solís except for En Mi Viejo San Juan

No.	Title	Length
1.	"Quiéreme"	05:19
2.	"El Peor de Mis Fracasos"	04:50
3.	"Y Yo Sin Ti"	03:58
4.	"Mi Eterno Amor Secreto"	04:11
5.	"Mi Mayor Necesidad"	04:28
6.	"Sigue Sin Mi"	04:11
7.	"Tu Compañero/Viva el Amor"	04:34
8.	"Si No Te Hubieras Ido"	07:24
9.	"En Mi Viejo San Juan" (Written by Noel Estrada)	04:19

== Personnel ==
This information from music.barnesandnoble.com.

- Bebu Silvetti - conductor
- Victor Aguilar - percussion
- Salo Loyo - piano
- Rodolfo Luviano - synthesizer, keyboards
- Emilio García - drums
- Fabian Perez - acoustic guitar, electric guitar
- Fabiola Antunez - background vocals
- Fidel Arreygue - bass
- Gustavo Borner - mastering
- Charles Paakkari - engineer
- Ezra Kliger - string coordinator
- Javier García - contributor
- Henry Hutchinson - contributor
- Carlos Francisco Hernandez - monitor engineer

== Charts ==
Chart (2000)	Peak position
US Top Latin Albums (Billboard)	6
US Latin Pop Albums (Billboard)	4
US Independent Albums (Billboard)	26
US Heatseekers Albums (Billboard)	40
