= Rickin Sánchez =

Puerto Rican wrestling sportscaster, boxing promoter and television producer (died 2023)

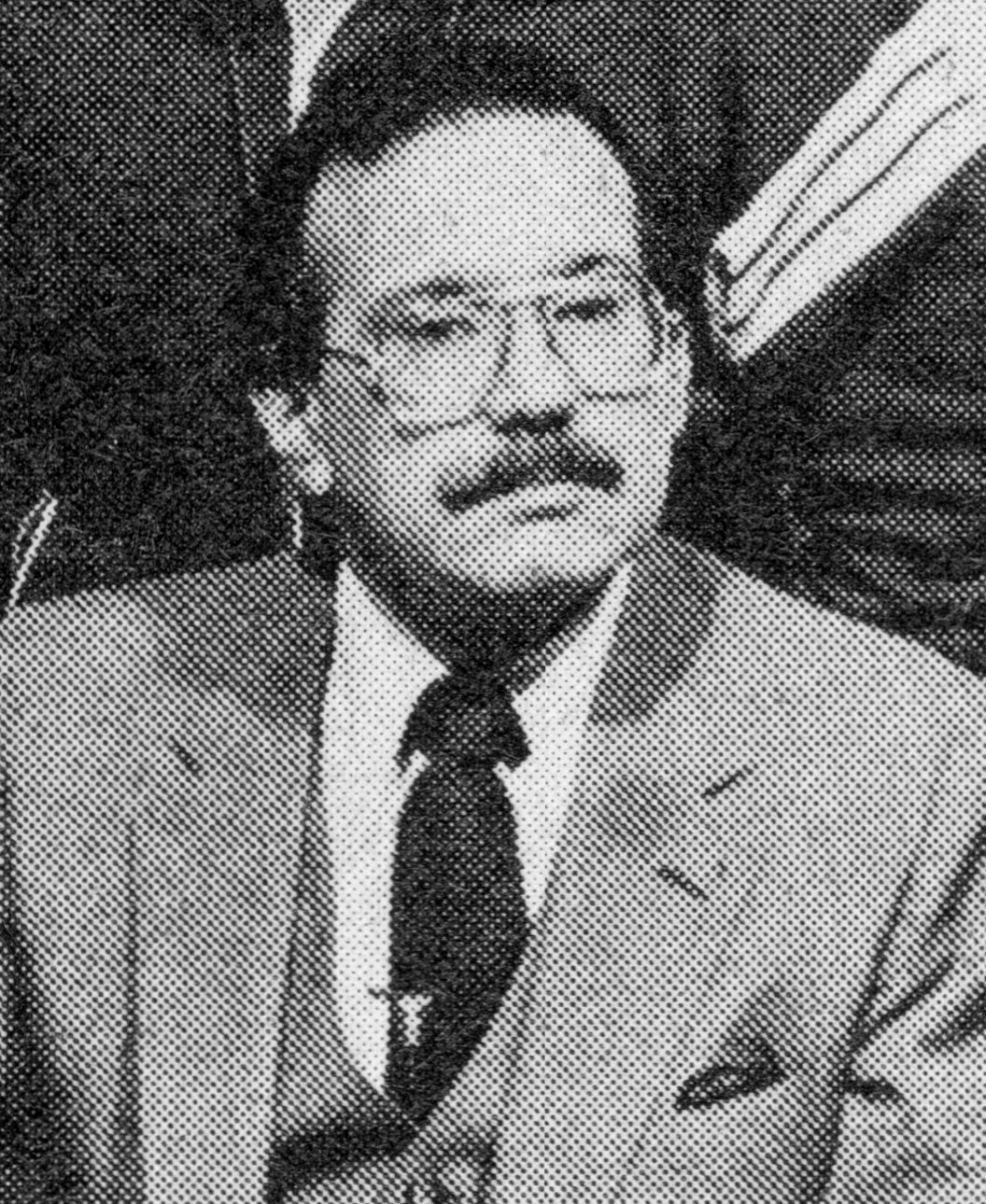
- Sánchez on the interview set of Superestrellas de la Lucha Libre in 1982
- Born: June 5, 1935; Canóvanas, Puerto Rico
- Died: January 17, 2023 (aged 87)
- Education: University of Puerto Rico at Mayagüez
- Occupations: Wrestling, boxing, and baseball television broadcaster, as well as a boxing promoter and television producer

Enrique "Rickin" Sánchez Betancourt (June 5, 1935 – January 17, 2023) was a Puerto Rican wrestling, boxing, and baseball television broadcaster, as well as a boxing promoter and television producer. He was the main broadcaster and producer used by Capitol Sports Promotions when that company's shows, mainly the one named "Superestrellas de la Lucha Libre" ("Wrestling Superstars"), were broadcast island-wide in Puerto Rico on Canal 4, then known as WAPA-TV. He left the company in 1984 after a dispute with part owner of WWC Victor Jovica. He was substituted by Hugo Savinovich. He briefly ran a wrestling promotion in 1985. In 1986 he acquired the rights to WWF TV for the Puerto Rico market and put WWE shows on WAPA.

Sánchez studied elementary, middle and high school in Canóvanas. He entered the University of Puerto Rico at Mayagüez in 1952 where he took courses in Civil Engineering, although he finished a bachelor's degree in Surveying in 1955. He was also a boxing executive, being one of the organizers of the Puerto Rican Boxing Commission, alongside Héctor Cardona, Manolo Rodríguez, Tomás Ramos Librán and the famous singer, Felipe Rodriguez. He was a native of the northern city of Canovanas, where in 2016, he was the object of a municipal dedication.

Sánchez was also formerly a radio show host, as he began his career hosting a show named "Tablero de los Deportes" ("Sports' Scoreboard"), where he joined to substitute the legendary Puerto Rican basketball player, Fufi Santori.

== Television channel founder ==
Sánchez was the founder of a popular but short-lived television channel in Puerto Rico, named "Videomax", based at WRFB channel 52.

== Personal life and death ==
In 2016 Sánchez was inducted to the University of Puerto Rico at Mayagüez Sports Hall of Fame. He was married to Blanche Vidal. Their son, Rickin Sánchez, Jr., was also a television producer and a television director. Sánchez, Jr. died in 2007. Sánchez died on January 17, 2023. He was interred at the New Canóvanas Municipal Cemetery in Canóvanas, Puerto Rico.

Rickin Sánchez was posthumously honored at the 50th anniversary show of the World Wrestling Council.

== Awards and accomplishments ==
- World Wrestling League
  - Salón de los Inmortales (class of 2015)

== See also ==
- List of Puerto Ricans
