= Carmín Vega =

Puerto Rican singer

- Born: Carmen María Vega Correa; 6 September 1955 (age 70); Ponce, Puerto Rico
- Genres: Bolero
- Occupations: Singer and comedian
- Years active: 1984–present
- Label: Disco Hit Productions

Carmín Vega (born 6 September 1955) is a Puerto Rican singer and comedian. She has been called "the woman with a thousand voices and a thousand faces".

== Early years ==
Carmín Vega (birth name: Carmen María Vega Correa) was born in Mercedita, Puerto Rico, on 6 September 1955. From a very young age, Vega showed her ability for singing when, in 1965, she was chosen from among 400 other contestants in a program for amateur singers. As the first winner in the competition her prize was the recording of her first 45 LP titled La Marca de Un Beso.

== Entry into show business ==
As a young girl, Vega was part of shows by Sophy, Danny Rivera and Lucecita Benítez. She was also in the 1960s La nueva ola show, produced by Tommy Muñiz, and in Luis Vigoreaux Presenta, by the producer of the same name.

As her fame spread, Vega was contracted by Cervecería Corona working side-by-side with José Miguel Agrelot, Luis Antonio Rivera ("Yoyo Boing") and Shorty Castro for live shows around the Island.

Vega married Mexican comedian Carlos Font, of Kiko y Karlo, and moved to Mexico City in the later part of the 1960s. She remained there for ten years working night clubs, and some TV shows, including Siempre en domingo with Raúl Velasco. The show won an award as the most outstanding foreign artists in 1968.

In the 1970s Vega returned to Puerto Rico working several TV shows including Noche de gala, El show de Chucho Avellanet, El show de Iris Chacón, Musicomedia, Una chica llamada Ivonne Coll, Su show favorito, Luis Vigoreaux presenta and Super show Goya.

In 1981 Vega, imitating the voices of Iris Chacón, Lucecita Benítez and Olga Guillot, worked as host of the radio show Con Carmín en el tapón aired though WAPA Radio in 1986.

She presented live solo shows in the Dominican Republic, in addition to shows with Freddy Veras Goyco, and others. She recorded with Trío Los Andinos. In New York she acted accompanied by Felipe "La Voz" Rodríguez at the Teatro Puerto Rico and Teatro Comodore.

In the 2000s Vega participated as a guest on Sábado Gigante, Cristina and Despierta América in Miami. In 2003 Vega presented a musical marathon at the Caguas, Puerto Rico, Centro de Bellas Artes Angel O. Berríos.

In 2003 she was featured with Trio Los Andinos in the album "Los Andinos: Homenaje a Rafael Hernandez, con Carmín Vega", which appeared under the label Disco Hit Productions (Santurce, Puerto Rico). In 2000, she launched "Carmin Vega...Para que tu la Oigas", a Latin pop CD album, under the independent label CVC Records.

== See also ==
- List of Puerto Ricans
