= The Weather Smells Like Oranges =

EP by Las Acevedo
- Released: February 2010
- Recorded: December 2009
- Genre: Pop
- Label: Independent

The Weather Smells Like Oranges is the first EP by the Dominican picnic-pop band Las Acevedo, released independently in February 2010, shortly after their single "Chaka Chaka!" reached popularity.

The songs were composed by the twin sisters Anabel and Cristabel Acevedo, using spanglish slang in a minimalistic and bucolic sound combination of a bongo, ukulele-tuned classic guitar, and a tambourine, wrapped with naïve lyrics about sexual longing, idyllic romances, and adulthood denial. The EP as well as the band's concept were produced and designed by visual artist and journalist Ismael Ogando.

The single "Chaka Chaka!" was the only song of the band to become popular reaching international recognition.

The first version of the EP was recorded using a Macbook pro and mixed with the software Audacity in December 2009 by Ogando in a rehearsal room at Centro Cultural Srta. Ercilia Pepin in Santiago de los Caballeros. Later the EP was remastered in a professional studio and officially launched in February 2010.

The EP contains 4 songs and a bonus track.

== Track listing ==
1. "The Weather Smells Like Oranges"
2. "Reloj de Arena"
3. "Chaka Chaka!"
4. "I-L-Y (Call It Love)"
5. "The Longest Song Ever"
