= Victoria Hernández =

Puerto Rican businesswoman and music entrepreneur

- 1930 photograph from Miguel Angel Amadeo
- Born: March 23, 1897; Aguadilla, Puerto Rico, Spanish Empire
- Died: April 11, 1998 (aged 101); Trujillo Alto, Puerto Rico, United States
- Other names: "La Madrina" (the godmother)
- Occupation: music entrepreneur
- Years active: 1927–1969
- Known for: opening the first Latin music store in New York City
- Relatives: Rafael Hernández Marín
- Musical career
- Origin: New York City
- Genres: Latin music
- Instrument: piano
- Years active: 1919–1969
- Label: Hispano

Victoria Hernández (March 23, 1897 – April 11, 1998) was an Afro-Puerto Rican music entrepreneur. Though a talented musician, she devoted her career to the business aspects of the music industry. In 1927, she opened the first Latin music store in New York City, one of only sixteen businesses owned by Puerto Rican migrant women. She served as an agent to locate music talent for record labels and bandleaders and at one point owned her own record label. After following her brother to Mexico City, Hernández returned to the Bronx and founded Casa de Música, later renamed to Casa Hernández. The music store she founded in 1941, now known as Casa Amadeo, antigua Casa Hernandez has the longest record of continuous operation of any music store in New York City.

== Early life ==
Victoria Hernández was born on March 23, 1897, in Aguadilla, Puerto Rico to María Hernández Marín and José Miguel Rosa Espinoza. (Note: There are discrepancies regarding the names of her parents. Martínez states that her mother was María Hernández Medina (whose mother was Cristiana Medina) and her father was José Miguel Rosa Espinoza. Gates and Brooks-Higginbotham, give the mother of all four children as simply María Hernández, but the father as Miguel Angel Rosa and note that the children used only their mother's surname. The 1910 U.S. Census from Puerto Rico indicates that the mother's name was María Hernández y Marín and this seems to be confirmed by the 1920 U.S. census which shows Criantea Marín, a sixty-five year old widow, as the mother of Maria Hernandez. Hernández, in an interview given in 1981, stated that her mother was María, her father was Gaspar and that the four children were raised by their grandmother Chrisanta.) Her parents were Afro-Puerto Rican tobacco workers and her father was a talented guitarist. The oldest daughter in the family, all of her siblings Rafael (1891/92-1965), Jesús "Pocholo" (1899–1982) and Rosa Elvira (1905–?) would become accomplished musicians. They were encouraged by their maternal grandmother, who lived with the family, to study music and Victoria became a skilled cellist, violinist and pianist.

== Career ==
In 1919, Hernández moved with her mother, grandmother and siblings to New York City and began work as a factory seamstress, who gave piano lessons to generate additional income. Within eight years, in 1927, she and her brothers bought a store, located at 1735 Madison Avenue in East Harlem. The store, Almacenes Hernández (Hernández Music Store), the first "Puerto Rican–owned music store in New York City", carried records and guitars, as well as music rolls for player pianos. In the back rooms, Hernández gave music lessons to students like Tito Puente and Loco Esteves and her brother Rafael composed music. In the era, it was unacceptable for respectable Latina women to perform as popular musicians, so though ostensibly owned by the siblings, Victoria ran the business to support the family and give her brothers an income so that they could devote their time to composing and performing. According to the historian Virginia Sánchez Korrol, at the time Hernández was one of only sixteen Puerto Rican women operating businesses in the United States.

In 1927, Hernández added her own recording label, Hispano to her enterprises. Her label produced several records for Las Estrellas Boricuas and Los Diablos de la Plena, two groups known in the Puerto Rican music community, as well as songs composed by Rafael, including his now well-known song, Pura Flama. She successfully sold many records until her bank failed as a result of the Great Depression, forcing her to close the label in 1929. As her business grew, Hernández needed more space and relocated to 1724 Madison Avenue in 1930. In 1932, Rafael formed a group, which he named Cuarteto Victoria (Victoria Quartet) in her honor. Hernández served as his booking agent and organized his tours and recording sessions. To contest the stereotype that musicians were irresponsible bohemians, Hernández insisted that the quartet forego the traditional costumes featuring ruffled-sleeve shirts and instead wear suits and ties. As she gained a reputation, Hernández began working with record labels like Columbia Records, Decca and Victor to book instrumentalists for recording sessions and with bandleaders like Xavier Cugat, who were searching for musicians. Hernández also often assisted the musicians themselves by advancing them money in exchange for a cut of their later earnings. Her benevolence earned her the honorific La Madrina (the godmother) from some, but also less flattering titles by those who felt her charges were usurious.

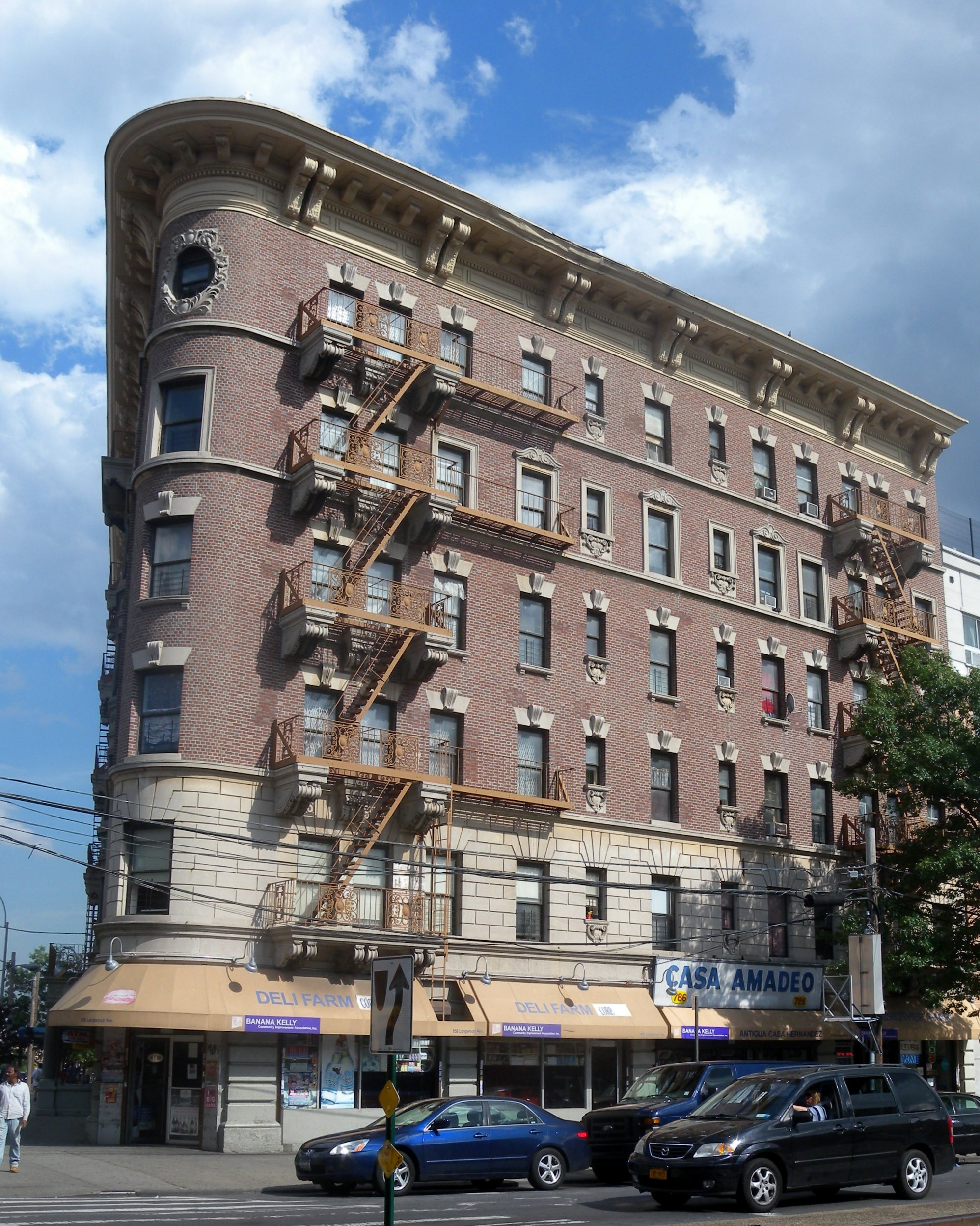
Casa Amadeo, antigua Casa Hernande

The Hernández siblings sold Almacenes Hernández to the Verne Records owner, Luis Cuevas in 1939 and both Rafael and Victoria moved from the United States. After first going to Puerto Rico and reforming the group Cuarteto Victoria, they recorded and performed in Curaçao and the toured in Colombia, Panama, New York and Mexico before settling in Mexico City in 1940. After unsuccessfully trying to restart her business in Mexico, Hernández returned to New York City and in 1941, moved into the Manhanset Building at 786 Prospect Avenue in The Bronx. She opened another music store on the ground floor of the building, known as Casa de Música (House of Music). As before, her brother Rafael was listed as one of the owners, however, he remained in Mexico City through the 1940s and Victoria ran the business. She sold instruments, records and sheet music, but also carried men's suits, women's fashions and hats and gave music lessons for extra income. The variety of items were not uncommon at the time, as exclusive stores specializing in only one product did not emerge until the late part of the 1940s.

Hernández soon renamed the business as Casa Hernández and operated it until 1965 when Rafael died. Losing interest in the venture upon his death, she hired Johnny Cabán to manage the store for the next four years. In 1969 Hernández sold the store to Miguel Angel "Mike" Amadeo. He renamed the store Casa Amadeo, antigua Casa Hernández, retaining the historic ties to the Hernández siblings. Still in operation, the store has the longest record of continuous operation of any music store in New York City. After she sold the store, Hernández became the companion of Gabriel Oller, another music entrepreneur who owned the second Puerto Rican music store opened in New York, the Spanish Music Center. Hernández remained in Manhattan until the 1980s.

== Death and legacy ==
Hernández died on April 11, 1998, in Trujillo Alto, Puerto Rico and was buried in Rafael's tomb in the Santa María Magdalena de Pazzis Cemetery of Old San Juan. Hernández's career is evidence of the ways in which women in her era took on both traditional roles as caretakers but managed to live in nontraditional ways by becoming involved in business.

== See also ==
- List of Puerto Ricans
- History of women in Puerto Rico
