= Irma Nydia Vázquez =

Puerto Rican beauty pageant contestant (1929–2019)

Irma Nydia Vázquez (June 8, 1929 – May 2, 2019) was Puerto Rico's representative (as Miss Puerto Rico) to the 1948 Miss America pageant. Although Malen Pietrantoni started Puerto Rico's annual participation in the event in 1937 as Miss Puerto Rico, and Zulma Caballero Lopez participated in 1938, Vázquez is nonetheless generally credited with being the first Puerto Rican contestant in the event, which required all contestants to sign a contract, which then required that "contestant must be in good health and of the white race."

== Life ==
Born in San Juan, Puerto Rico is he daughter of an industrialist and sister of a future Puerto Rico secretary of state, and the founder of professional baseball in Puerto Rico Pedro Vázquez., the founder of professional baseball in Puerto Rico, and Genoveva Vázquez, a seamstress who designed former First Lady Ines Maria Mendoza's dress during the White House gala hosted by President John F. Kennedy at which cellist Pablo Casals performed. She began her school studies at the Colegio Puertorriqueño de Niñas in San Juan; he continued in the Labra and Central High School of Santurce. She was the second wife of Puerto Rican singer and composer Bobby Capó, a marriage initially opposed by her family but which lasted 25 years, during which they had 5 children.

Vázquez died on May 2, 2019, in Hackettstown, New Jersey, under the care of her daughters and granddaughters. She was 89. Vázquez was buried at the Coamo Municipal Cemetery in Coamo, Puerto Rico, next to Capó's grave.
