= Los Grandes Éxitos de Marco Antonio Solís y Los Bukis: Recuerdos, Tristeza y Soledad =

Compilation album by Marco Antonio Solís
- Released: August 11, 1998
- Genre: Pop Latino, cumbia
- Length: 63:17
- Label: Fonovisa

Marco Antonio Solís chronology
Los Grandes Éxitos de Marco Antonio Solís y Los Bukis: Recuerdos, Tristeza y Soledad (1998)	En Vivo (2000)

Los Grandes Éxitos de Marco Antonio Solís y Los Bukis: Recuerdos, Tristeza y Soledad (Eng.: "Memories, Sadness and Loneliness") is a compilation album released by Marco Antonio Solís on August 11, 1998. "Recuerdos, Tristeza y Soledad" is also a song that was released from his first studio album En Pleno Vuelo. This compilation album of his greatest hits are from his first two studio albums En Pleno Vuelo and Marco along with albums from when he was with Los Bukis. The album was certified gold in Mexico by AMPROFON.

== Track listing ==
All songs written and composed by Marco Antonio Solís

No.	Title	Length
1.	"Así Como Te Conocí"	04:11
2.	"Si Ya No Te Vuelvo a Ver"	03:49
3.	"Que Pena Me Das"	04:06
4.	"Mi Mayor Necesidad"	04:04
5.	"No Me Arrepiento"	03:43
6.	"A Aquella"	03:33
7.	"Recuerdos, Tristeza y Soledad"	04:27
8.	"No Me Esperes Ya"	03:51
9.	"Cómo Fuí a Enamorarme de Tí"	04:30
10.	"Quiereme"	04:08
11.	"Si Me Recuerdas"	04:35
12.	"Para Que Seas Feliz"	04:50
13.	"Adiós Querida Esposa"	03:56
14.	"Tus Mentiras"	04:47
15.	"Será Mejor Que Te Vayas"	05:01
