= Playground 52 =

Public park in the Bronx, New York

- Interactive map of Playground 52
- Type: Playground
- Location: Longwood, Bronx, New York City
- Coordinates: 40.8152°N 73.9022°W
- Area: 1.8 acres (0.73 ha)
- Owner: NYC Parks
- Awards: Merit Award for General Design, ASLA
- Public transit: New York City Subway: East 149th Street station

Playground 52 (often written as Playground 52 LII) is a 1.8-acre (0.73 ha) playground at 681 Kelly Street in the Longwood neighborhood of the Bronx in New York City. The playground features basketball and handball courts, bathrooms, a spray shower, and a skate park, as well as an amphitheater with a large dance floor.

Originally built in the 1950s as a playground for MS 52, the playground suffered decay during the 1970s. In 1980, a group of volunteers known as 52 People for Progress (52 People for Change in some sources) began to rehabilitate the park in collaboration with local musicians such as Mike Amadeo and Eddie Palmieri. Although the school was renamed as MS 302 during the 1990s, the playground is still referred to as Playground 52.

The park is owned by the New York City Department of Parks and Recreation and is used as a venue for musical performances. The 52 People for Progress volunteers continue to maintain the park.

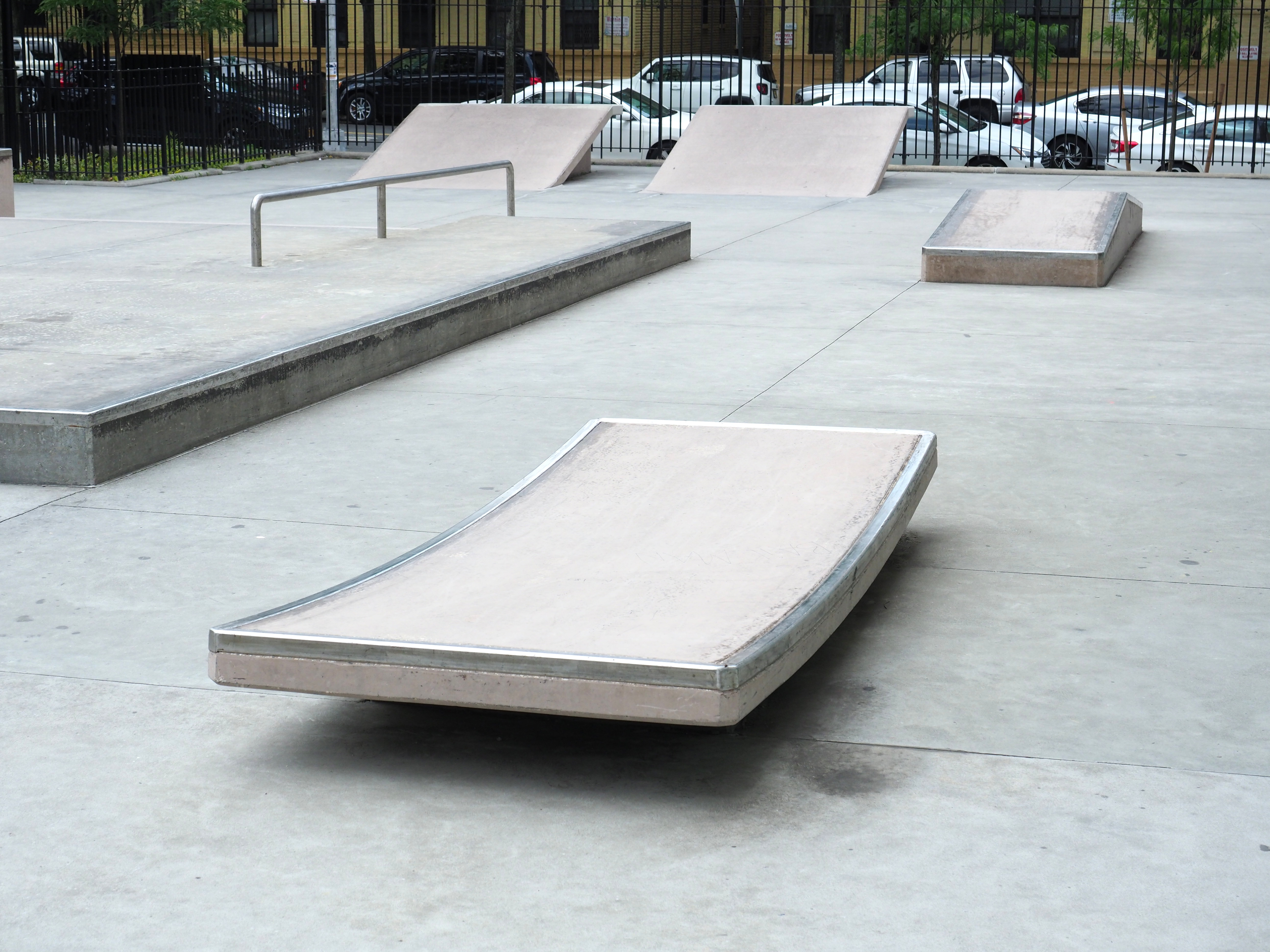
Skate park

The 4,000-square-foot (370 m^{2}) skate park was designed in 2018 by Spohn Ranch. It includes two banks, a quarter pipe, and a variety of street obstacles. BMX bikes, scooters, inline skates, and skateboards are allowed.

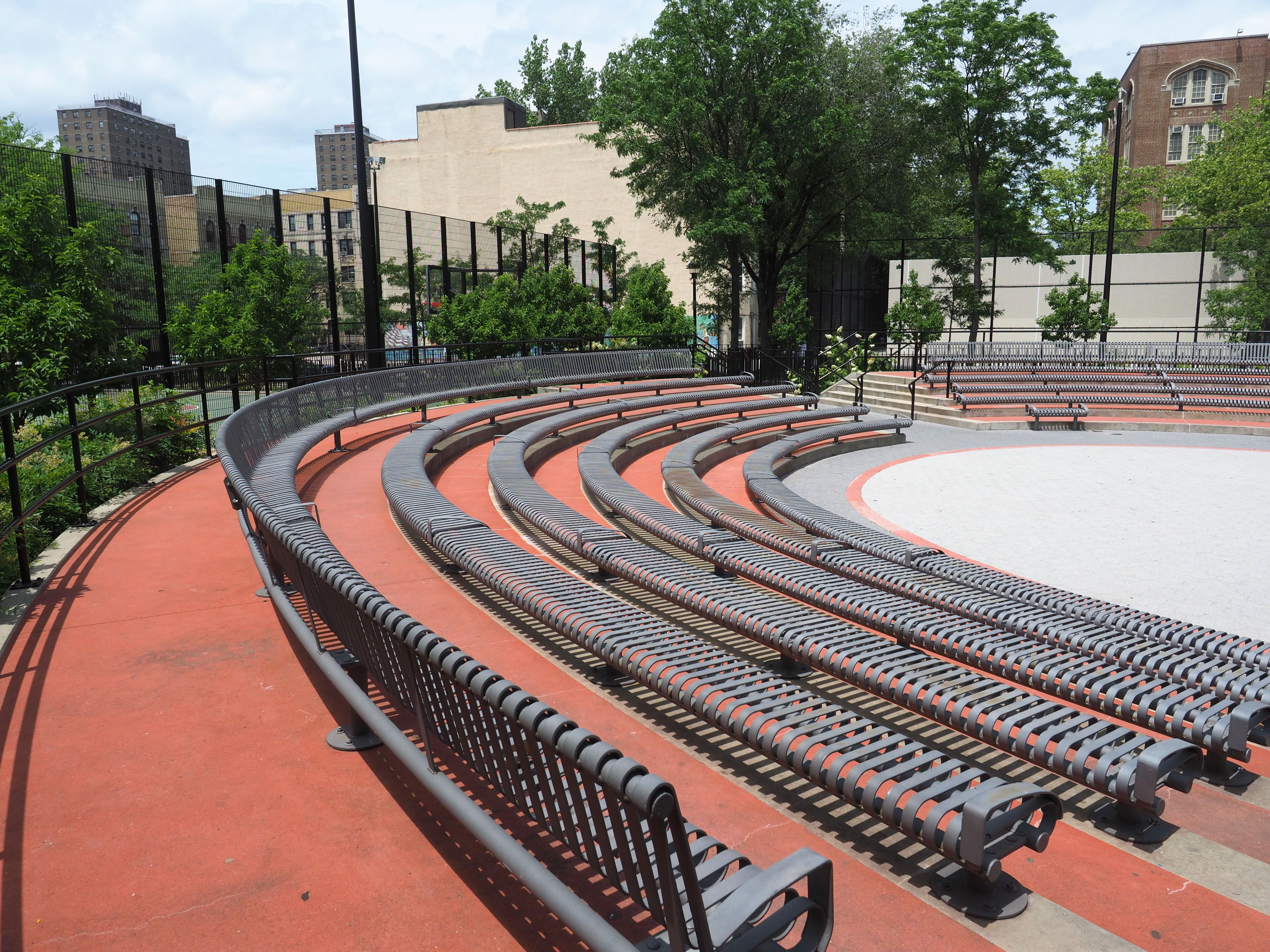
Amphitheater

Starting in 2017, the Playground underwent renovations including the creation of new basketball courts and a new amphitheater. The renovations were initially expected to be completed in May 2018. It reopened in September 2018. The 2017–2018 renovation won the 2019 Merit Award for General Design from the New York Chapter of the American Society of Landscape Architects. The ASLA noted that community input guided the design. The need for an expanded performance space to host salsa dances and concerts led to the construction of a 381 seat amphitheater with provision for gated access. The performance stage is covered and accessible, and a dance floor is included. The park is used by over 500 children daily.
