= Casa Amadeo, antigua Casa Hernandez =

Historic Latin music store in New York City

- U.S. National Register of Historic Places
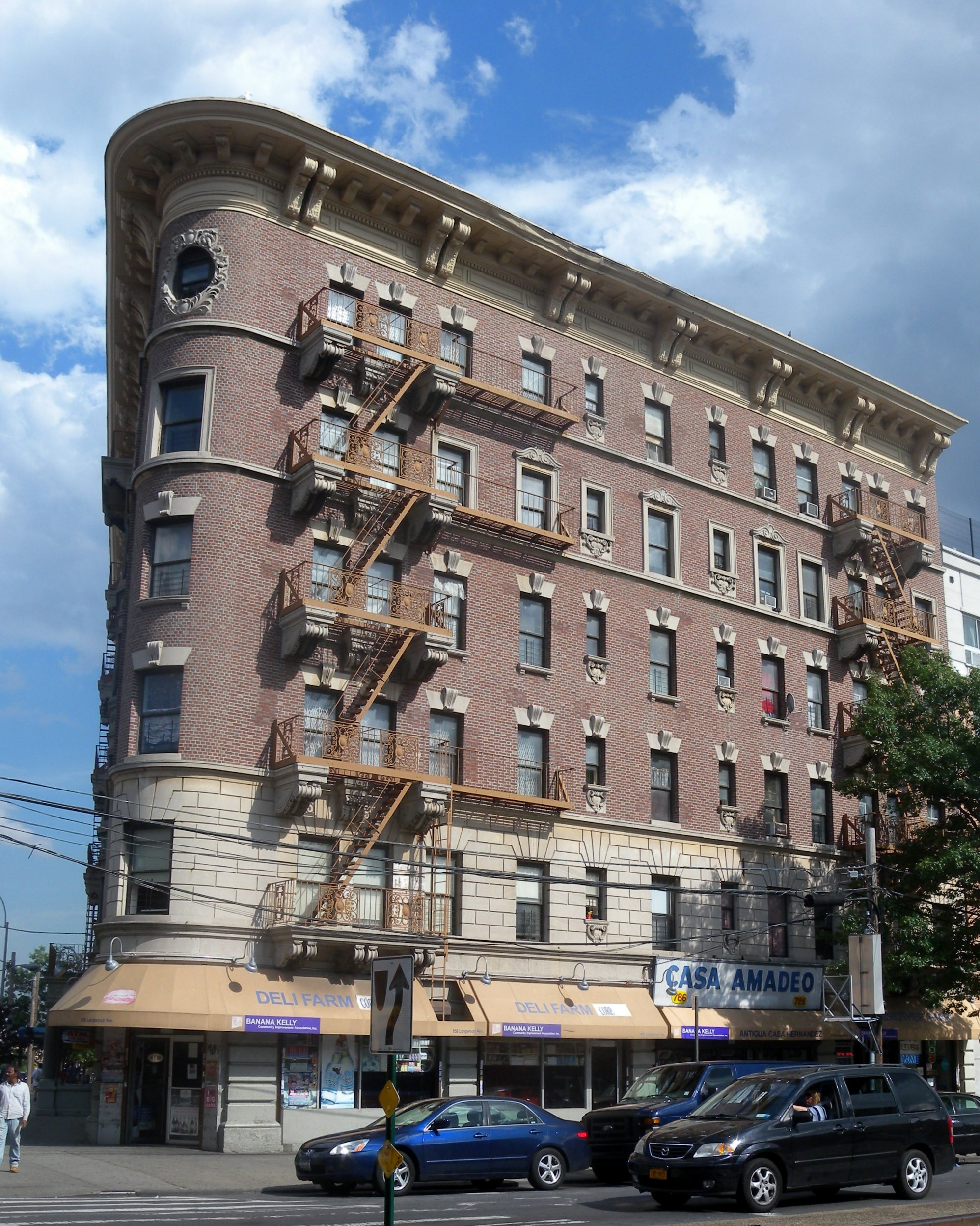

- Location within New York Location within the United States
- Location: 786 Prospect Ave., Bronx, New York
- Coordinates: 40°49′9″N 73°54′5″W
- Area: less than one acre
- Built: 1905
- Architects: Meehan, James F.
- Architectural style: Renaissance
- NRHP reference No.: 01000244
- Added to NRHP: March 23, 2001

Casa Amadeo, antigua Casa Hernández is the oldest continuously-occupied Latin music store in New York City and the Bronx, having opened in 1941.

Casa Amadeo is located in a historic apartment building in Longwood, Bronx. Designed by James F. Meehan, the apartment building was built in 1905 and named The Manhaset. The building is a six-story, Neo-Renaissance style building with commercial storefronts on the first floor. The lower two stories are faced with rusticated stone and the upper floors in red brick. It features a projecting entrance porch flanked by Corinthian order columns. The building is managed by local grassroots organization Banana Kelly, which has rehabilitated and maintained buildings in Longwood since the 1970s.

== History ==
The first Puerto Rican owned music store in New York City, Almacenes Hernández, was founded by siblings Victoria Hernández and Rafael Hernández at 1724 Madison Avenue in 1927. Almacenes Hernández was sold to record producer Luis Cuevas in 1939.

The second music store founded by the siblings, Casa Hernández, was founded in 1941. It was sold in 1969 to musician and composer Miguel Ángel "Mike" Amadeo, who renamed it Casa Amadeo, antigua Casa Hernández. Mike Amadeo still owns and operates the music store.

It was listed on the National Register of Historic Places in 2001.

== Miguel Angel Amadeo ==
Miguel Ángel Amadeo
- Born: Miguel Ángel Amadeo Vicente; Bayamón, Puerto Rico
- Occupations: musician, composer, music store owner.
- Years active: 1954––present
- Labels: Alegre Records, Fania Records

Miguel Angel Amadeo, better known as "Mike" Amadeo, is a Puerto Rican musician and owner of the Casa Amadeo music store in the Bronx. Amadeo, born in Bayamon, Puerto Rico is the son of composer Alberto "Titi" Amadeo, a musician who played with Cuban bandleader Desi Arnaz for NBC. He is the uncle of Grammy Award-nominated musician Tito Nieves. Mike Amadeo is a prolific composer, with nearly 300 songs to his credit, performed by artists such as Celia Cruz, Danny Rivera, and Cheito Gonzalez. In 1947, Amadeo arrived in New York at the age of 13 with his mother.

In 1954 Amadeo took a trip to Puerto Rico. While there he met pianist Rafael Ithier, who was working for bandleader Rafael Cortijo. When Cortijo's group fell apart, Ithier formed El Gran Combo de Puerto Rico, and Amadeo began contributing music to the Gran Combo, including Amadeo's best known song - Que Me Lo Den en Vida (Give it to Me in Life).

Back in New York City, Amadeo joined Alegre Records, and associated with the first generation of Nuyorican musicians including Johnny Pacheco, Ray Barretto and the brothers Eddie Palmieri, and Charlie Palmieri.

With his long residency, and personal connections to the Latin music community, Mike Amadeo is known as a community historian. For his contributions to Puerto Rican music and the Bronx, Mike Amadeo has been honored by the National Puerto Rican Day Parade in 2008, a Hostos Center for the Arts & Culture concert in 2005, and by the Bronx Council on the Arts in 2010. In 2014, the corner of Logwood Avenue and Prospect Avenue was named Miguel Angel "Mike" Amadeo Way.

== See also ==
- Alegre Records
- Fania Records
- Rafael Hernández Marín
- El Gran Combo de Puerto Rico
- Playground 52
- National Register of Historic Places listings in the Bronx
