= Daniel Santos (singer) =

Puerto Rican singer (1916-1992)

- Daniel Santos

Background information
- Also known as: El Inquieto Anacobero
- Born: Daniel Santos Betancourt; June 6, 1916; Santurce, Puerto Rico
- Died: November 27, 1992 (aged 76) Ocala, Florida, US
- Genres: Plena, Guaracha, Cuban Rumba and Bolero
- Years active: 1930–1992

Daniel Santos (June 6, 1916 – November 27, 1992) was a Puerto Rican singer and composer of boleros, and an overall performer of multiple Caribbean music genres, including guaracha, plena and rumba. Over the course of his career he adopted several names created by the public and became known as "El Jefe" and "El Inquieto Anacobero".

== Early years ==
Santos (birth name: Daniel Santos Betancourt) was born and raised with his three sisters, Sara, Rosa Lydia and Luz América in Trastalleres, a poor section of Santurce, Puerto Rico. He attended Las Palmitas Elementary School. In 1924, his family moved to New York City looking for a better way of life. When his parents, Rosendo and María enrolled him in school, he had to start from the first grade again because he did not know enough English. Santos joined his high school's choir, but he dropped out of high school in his second year and moved out of his parents' apartment. When he was fifteen years old he began looking for work in Manhattan.

Santos moved into a small apartment, where, one day, he started to sing "Te Quiero, Dijiste" (You said 'I Love You'). A member of the Trío Lírico was passing by and heard him sing. He then knocked on Santos' door. The trio member invited Daniel to join the trio and he accepted. Santos debuted with them on September 13, 1930; he sang in various social events and was paid a dollar for every song that he sang. He returned to Puerto Rico only to return once more to Manhattan after he unsuccessfully tried to acquire a job as a singer at WKAQ, which was one of the island's main radio stations.

== Musical career ==
=== "Cuarteto Flores" with Pedro Flores ===
In late 1933 and 1934, Santos performed in a nightclub named Los Chilenos located near Broadway and was paid twenty dollars per weekend. Personally, Santos led a life of excesses, including maintaining several romantic relationships at once. In 1938, Santos was working at the Cuban Casino Cabaret in Manhattan, which was normally visited by Puerto Ricans and other Latinos. His chores included singing, waiting on tables and on occasions he was the master of ceremonies for which he was paid a salary of thirty dollars. On one occasion, he was singing "Amor Perdido" (Lost Love), without knowing that the composer of the song Pedro Flores was in the audience. Flores liked what he heard and invited Santos to join his group "El Cuarteto Flores" which also included Myrta Silva, and would in the future also include Pedro Ortiz Dávila (also known by his stage name "Davilita"). Santos recorded many songs with the Cuarteto Flores and started to gain fame. Among the songs he recorded were: "Perdon"; "Amor"; "El Ultimo Adios" "Si Yo Fuera Millonario" by singer/composer Miguel Poventud and Borracho no Vale.

=== Participation in World War II ===
External audio
- You may listen to Santos sing "Linda" on YouTube

In the early 1940s, many young Puerto Rican men were drafted for World War II, among them Santos. Santos recorded "Despedida" (My Good-bye), a farewell song written by Flores from the viewpoint of an Army recruit who had to leave behind his girlfriend and his ailing mother, which became a hit. Santos recalled in an interview once that he had to hold back tears while recording the song, since his draft papers had just arrived and he would soon have to live a situation similar to what the song's lyrics described, but that a friend started mocking him at the control booth, to which he decided to curse him on the spot, trading the word mama'o (an extremely vulgar term in Puerto Rican Spanish for stupid). This incident produced two mannerisms that Santos eventually adopted in his singing style: chopped delivery (almost syllable by syllable, as suggested by Flores) and stretched last vowel in the last verse of each stanza, in almost every song he recorded afterwards.

He was sent to Maui Island, after completing his basic military training in Kentucky. In Maui, he was assigned to a US Army infantry unit which was used to replenish casualties in the Pacific theatre. Santos would joke that he escaped the "replenishment levies" because of his guitar playing skills. Nevertheless, he was sent to Okinawa towards the end of the war. While in the military Santos teamed up with Juanito Jiménez as a part of a duo dubbed Los Cumbancheros. After the war concluded Santos returned to New York, where he received a tribute upon his arrival. There he recorded "Linda", written specially for him by Flores for one of Santos' old girlfriends.

=== International performances ===
Santos became active in the Puerto Rican Independence Movement and identified himself with the Puerto Rican Nationalist Party and its president Pedro Albizu Campos after he was discharged from the military because of the prejudice which he experienced within the Army. His devotion for Albizu lasted throughout his life, to the point of commissioning, later in his life, a bronze bust of Albizu for his estate in Puerto Rico. With Davilita, he recorded "Patriotas" ("Patriots") and "La Lucha por la Independencia de Puerto Rico" ("The Fight for Puerto Rico's Independence"), which was adopted from one of Juan Antonio Corretjer's poems.

In March 1946, Santos inaugurated a bar and restaurant named Borinquen, and administrated the establishment for some weeks. Two months later he began singing Mexican music and boleros at Greenwich Village. Later that year he visited the Dominican Republic, where he had legal problems and was jailed briefly.

=== Santos in Cuba ===
By this time Santos' fame had grown and he decided to travel to Cuba, establishing a residence in Havana in 1946. At the moment Cuba was experiencing economic growth and Santos developed an interest in the island. Upon arriving he experienced success, making presentations in Paseo del Prado, Miramar and Vedado. These included a special presentation titled Alegrias de Hatuey, which was broadcast by "Radio Progreso", a radio station. He participated and sang for several other stations, including RHC-Cadena Azul and CMQ, where he participated in a program named Cascabel. This exposition came after he established friendships with local public figures. The Cuban public created two names adopted by Santos, these were Inquieto and Anacobero, which he later fused and became known as El Inquieto Anacobero. He also made five presentations in theaters, among them the Martí Theater.

In 1948, Santos was invited to perform in the Cuban National Palace by the president in office, Carlos Prío Socarrás. This year also marked Santos' debut with La Sonora Matancera, where he served as vocalist. His first successful single was titled Bigote de Gato, based on an area of Havana named "Luyano", which was infamous for serving as the home for fortune tellers. Later that year Santos was arrested after becoming involved in a fight where he accidentally injured a woman after trying to defend himself. Santos was subsequently pardoned by Prío Socarrás, but he asked to remain in jail twelve additional days to spend the Christmas celebration with some of the inmates. While in prison he composed a single named El Preso and was asked to write Amnistía as part of a campaign to promote the well-being of inmates. This was followed by several successful productions with Sonora Matancera. These included Dos gardenias and Pa' fricasé los pollos, which were based on Cuban music. Among several other contemporary records were: El juego de la vida, El 5 y 6, El ajiaco, El niño majadero, Ramoncito campeón and El tíbiri tábara.

On March 10, 1952, Fulgencio Batista organized a successful coup d'état and took control of the island's government. Santos, known for his Puerto Rican independentist preferences, was never in the good graces of the dictator. He made his nationalistic and democratic views well known throughout Latin America. As many people during those days, he viewed Fidel Castro's fight against Batista very favorably. In 1958, forbidden by Batista from returning to the island, he composed the song "Sierra Maestra", which borrowed parts of the official hymn of the 26th of July Movement. Santos donated the profits from "Sierra Maestra" to the Cuban Revolution.

=== Return to Puerto Rico ===
He returned to the island later that year and began an international tour on 1953, among the countries visited were Venezuela, Colombia and Mexico. In 1954, he returned to Puerto Rico and performed in hotels located in San Juan before continuing his tour throughout America which extended from 1955 to 1956. The tour concluded with a presentation in New York and he is returned to Cuba. Later that year he visited Ecuador for the first time in his artistic career. Here he was contracted to perform in a theater named "Apolo", where he worked with a band named the "Costa Rica Swing Boys". During his third presentation Santos lost his voice without completing the scheduled show, he tried to explain the situation to the public but was unable to calm them down and a riot erupted. While in Ecuador he composed two successful singles, Cataplum pa' and Cautiverio. Late in 1956, Santos recorded with a Venezuelan record label named "Discomoda".

In 1959, he briefly returned to Cuba. It was during this trip that he confronted Raul Castro and Ernesto "Che" Guevara about the political nature of the Cuban Revolution he had supported. He left Cuba abruptly, never to return, when Castro and Guevara failed to convince him that the Cuban Revolution was "nationalistic". A self proclaimed "anti-communist", he explained that he had supported the Cuban Revolution because its leadership had assured him that it was not communist.

On July 22, 1972 he performed in the inauguration ceremony of El Balcon del Pueblo, a building owned by Radio Cristal, which was located at Guayaquil. In this activity he performed for two consecutive hours, working an additional hour due to public acclaim.

== Later years ==
During the last years of his life, Santos toured the United States and Latin America, while experiencing health problems. He continued performing with several music groups. While he performed with the Sonora Matancera, Santos suffered a heart attack while he was sleeping in a hotel located in La Reforma after eating dinner. Santos continued performing during the following decades, making presentations in several Latin American countries. He continued to sing the songs that he had written during his career until he finally retired and established a residence in Florida.

In 1991, Santos visited some friends in New York City's Barrio Latino. During this visit Santos was walking through the street on a Saturday evening when he fainted and collapsed. He was attended by some bystanders and residents of the neighborhood who called the New York City Police Department. When the police arrived at the scene, they transported him to a local hospital. Santos was released two days after. During this time Santos was also suffering from mental illness, including memory loss due to Alzheimer's disease. Despite his health he made final presentations in some of Puerto Rico's municipalities, where he received recognitions in San Juan and Ponce. Santos was also invited to participate in a music festival in Cuba, where he was supposed to receive a homage, but was unable to attend.

Over the course of his life Daniel Santos was legally married on twelve separate occasions. His first marriage took place in 1934, where he married Lucy Montilla when he was eighteen years old. In 1947, he married Cuban socialite Eugenia Pérez Portal, who gave him his first son in 1948, Daniel Jr. After this he was involved in several relationships with women of several Latin American countries, on occasions having more than one consecutively. When he was 56 years old he married Luz Dary Padredin. The couple had two children, Danilú and David Albizu. Santos' last marriage was with Ana Rivera, who was originally from Puerto Rico.

Daniel Santos died on November 27, 1992, aged 76, at his ranch, "Anacobero's Ranch" in Ocala, Florida. He was buried at the Santa María Magdalena de Pazzis Cemetery in San Juan, Puerto Rico.

== Legacy ==
Santos' life was the subject of one semi-autobiography, El Inquieto Anacobero: confesiones de Daniel Santos a Héctor Mújica, written as Santos told his story to Venezuelan author Héctor Mújica in 1982. His life was also the subject of four biographical books: Mi Vida Entera (2020) written by his daughter Danilú Santos-Price,; Vengo a decirle adiós a los muchachos (1989) by Josean Ramos; La importancia de llamarse Daniel Santos (1988), by Luis Rafael Sánchez, El Inquieto Anacobero, by Salvador Garmendia.

In the 1940s Santos recorded "En mi Viejo San Juan", a song by Noel Estrada, and made it famous worldwide with his recordings and performances, especially among Puerto Ricans living overseas.

In 2000 he was posthumously inducted into the International Latin Music Hall of Fame.

== See also ==
- List of Puerto Ricans
- Puerto Rican Nationalist Party
