= Felipe Rodríguez (singer) =

Puerto Rican singer (1926–1999)

Luis Felipe Rodríguez
- Also known as: "La Voz"
- Born: May 8, 1926; Caguas, Puerto Rico
- Died: May 26, 1999 (aged 73) San Juan, Puerto Rico
- Genre: Bolero
- Occupation: Singer
- Label: Fania Records

Luis Felipe Rodríguez, better known as Felipe "La Voz" Rodríguez, (May 8, 1926 – May 26, 1999) born in Caguas, Puerto Rico, was a singer of boleros. He is regarded as the most popular Puerto Rican male singer of the 1950s based on record sales and live audience records. Many of Rodríguez's recordings are often considered to be classics in Puerto Rico.

== Early years ==
Rodríguez was born in the Savarona section of Caguas, the son of a sharecropper and a midwife. He had a rough childhood; his father died before he was born. In 1930, his mother Carmen moved to Santurce and settled in Barrio Obrero, a working class district of San Juan. There, Rodríguez went to school and practiced his singing skills during his free time. Julito Rodríguez (no relation to Felipe), another bolero singer, heard Rodriguez sing and invited him to form a singing duo; they later formed a trio called "Los Romanceros" (The Romanceers) and he first took part in a radio program, the popular amateur showcase "Tribuna del Arte", hosted and produced by Rafael Quiñones Vidal.

== "La Voz" (The Voice) ==
In 1950, Rodríguez left the trio and tried different projects, such as forming or joining other trios (particularly the Trío Los Antares), duos (he formed the "Dúo Pérez-Rodríguez" with his then wife, and continued his professional relationship with her long after their divorce) and singing solo. He was given the nickname, "La Voz" (The Voice), a name which was to stay with him for the rest of his life, by Puerto Rican radio announcer Mariano Artau. Héctor Lavoe's stage name was based on Rodríguez's nickname.

== United States tour ==
Rodríguez went on tour in the United States where he broke the attendance and ticket records previously set for the Hispanic audience by Argentine singer Libertad Lamarque. In 1954, Rodríguez met Pedro Ortíz Davila ("Davilita") and formed a very successful duo performing in such places as the Teatro Puerto Rico. Even though "Davilita"'s voice was not as sharp as it was when he was younger, they were able to have many hits together, particularly the Pedro Flores song "La Rosa Blanca" (The White Rose). In the 1960s, they, together with Rafael Cortijo and El Gran Combo confronted the new wave of rock music which was invading the island head-on.

In 1965, Rodríguez became the first Puerto Rican to sing the Puerto Rican national anthem, La Borinqueña, at a sporting event, celebrated at the Madison Square Garden in New York City, where fellow Puerto Rican José "Chegui" Torres won the World Light Heavyweight boxing title in a fight against Willie Pastrano which was televised coast to coast in the United States. Rodríguez had himself been an amateur boxer in his youth as well as an occasional referee at amateur boxing matches, and was a scout for young boxing talent.

== Radio Show ==
Back in Puerto Rico, Rodríguez started his own radio program at radio station WITA-AM in San Juan, called "Éste es tu disco" (This is your record). In 1973, Rodríguez and Davilita paired again to record "Canciones de Pedro Flores" and in 1974, "Canciones de Rafael Hernández". Also in 1974, Felipe Rodríguez, Davilita and Pellin Rodríguez (no relation to Felipe) recorded a trilogy which also are considered as Christmas classics in Puerto Rico. These were "La Protesta de los Reyes" (The Protest of the Wisemen), "Parranda parrandera" (Parrandous Parranda) and "Navidad" (Christmas).

== Recordings ==
External audio
- You may listen to Felipe Rodríguez sing "La ultima copa " on YouTube

In 1952, he recorded the following songs:

- "La Ultima Copa" (The Last Drink) tango recorded as a bolero (and one of several such crossover hits Rodríguez and others recorded),
- "Golondrina Viajera" (Traveling Swallow),
- "Los Reyes no Llegaron" (The Three Wise Men did not Arrive), a poignant Christmas song written by Esteban Taronjí, and
- "Esta Navidad" (This Christmas)

all of which became hits and are now considered as classics in Puerto Rico.

== Later years ==
In the 1980s, Rodríguez continued to record and had hits with "Por Primera Vez" (1983) (For the First Time) and "Juntos otra Vez" (1986) (Together Again). In 1987, he was able to realize one of his dreams when he performed at the Luis A. Ferre Center for Performing Arts in San Juan. In the 1990s, Rodríguez continued to be active as a singer and when not singing he would be at the recording studio producing.

Later in the 1990s, he suffered a fall from a step ladder in his home in Carolina, Puerto Rico, which hurt his back. Eventually the fall complicated with a pneumonia and contributed to his death. Felipe "La Voz" Rodríguez died on May 26, 1999, in San Juan, Puerto Rico. He was buried at Cementerio Parque de Luz in his hometown of Caguas, Puerto Rico.

Rodriguez was also, along with Rickin Sánchez and three others, one of the original organizers of the Puerto Rican boxing Commission.

== Legacy ==
The city of Caguas named the main auditorium of its own Center for Performing Arts as the Felipe Rodríguez Hall. A book written by music historian Pedro Malavet Vega "La Vellonera esta directa" has been written, chiefly about Rodríguez's life, and using his career trajectory as a backdrop and timetable for many other cultural and sociological events that occurred in Puerto Rico between the late 1940s and early 1960s.

In 2000 he was posthumously inducted into the International Latin Music Hall of Fame.

== See also ==
- Puerto Rican poetry
- List of Puerto Ricans
- Marta Romero
