= Myrta Silva =

Puerto Rican singer

- Also known as: Myrta Silva
- Born: Mirta Blanca Silva Oliveros; September 11, 1923; Arecibo, Puerto Rico
- Died: December 2, 1987 (aged 64) Arecibo, Puerto Rico
- Genres: Bolero, guaracha
- Occupations: Musician, songwriter, television producer
- Instrument: Vocals

Mirta Blanca Silva Oliveros (September 11, 1923 – December 2, 1987) better known as Myrta Silva, was a Puerto Rican singer, songwriter and television producer who was known affectionately as "La Gorda de Oro". She rose to fame in 1949 as the lead vocalist for the Cuban ensemble Sonora Matancera.

== Early years ==
Myrta Silva was born Mirta Blanca Silva Oliveros was born on September 11, 1923 in the city of Arecibo, Puerto Rico. Her father, Aureo Silva Oliveras, died when she was six years old and she was raised by her mother, María Aurelia Olivares Gonzales, who was her inspiration. Silva and her fans referred to her mother as "Mamá Yeya." In 1937, Silva made her first public presentation at the Oliver Theater in Arecibo. In these early years of her music career, she worked an average of twenty-five revue shows a week to support herself.

Circa 1938, Silva and her mother moved to New York, where she started a career in radio, theater and musical plays. In 1939, she made her debut in Brooklyn at the Atlantic Theater, soon becoming a regular at venues like the Teatro Hispano, Teatro Puerto Rico, and Carnegie Hall in New York.

== Singing career ==
Silva was working in a cabaret when she was discovered and offered a 10-year contract by RCA. In the late 1930s, she met the Puerto Rican composer Rafael Hernández, who convinced her to join his Cuarteto Victoria. Myrta traveled with the group all over Latin-America. Some time later, she also sang for another composer Pedro Flores in his Sexteto Flores, where she was joined by Daniel Santos and Pedro Ortiz Dávila.

=== As a composer ===
External audio
- You may listen to Awilda Pedroza's interpretation of Silvas "Qué sabes tú?" on YouTube.
- and to Luciano Quiñones piano interpretation here

In 1941, aged 14, Silva composed her first song, "Cuando vuelvas" ("When You Return"), recorded by Ruth Fernández. In 1942, she composed "En mi soledad" ("In My Solitude"), recorded by Daniel Santos, which became a hit in Latin America and in the Latin communities in the United States. Silva became the first woman certified as a timbalera by the American Federation of Music in 1943. In 1944, she wrote "Así es la vida" ("That's Life") and "Fácil de recordar" ("Easy to Remember") while she was performing in Havana, Cuba.

Silva had become an international singing star and was known as "The Queen of the Guaracha" by her fans in Latin America. From 1949 to 1950, she was the lead singer in the popular Cuban ensemble, La Sonora Matancera, at the same time continuing to compose. She received a good deal of recognition for her groups' performances throughout Latin America. In Argentina, she was named the "best-selling artist" in that country. In 1950, she was proclaimed by the Cuban government "The Most Popular Artist." When she decided to leave the group she was replaced by Celia Cruz, a young school teacher turned singer who went on to become known as the "Queen of Salsa."

=== Madame Chencha ===
In the 1950s, together with the Cuban composer Ñico Saquito (Antonio Fernández), Silva wrote a humorous song titled “Camina como Chencha” (“Walk Like Chencha”). In 1956, Silva produced and transmitted from New York a television program, Una hora contigo (An Hour with You). The show was transmitted by Canal 4 in Puerto Rico and Myrta moved back to the island. In her show she re-created the innovative character of "Madame Chencha." "Madame Chencha" became the first T.V. character dedicated to "rumors." This character created a lot of controversy between public figures and the television station, and as a consequence, Silva decided to leave the program and return to New York City.

=== In New York City ===
In New York City, she composed "Puerto Rico del alma" ("Puerto Rico of my Soul"). Between 1962 and 1964, she composed the following hit songs: "Qué sabes tú" ("What Do You Know?"), "Tengo que acostumbrarme" ("I Have To Get Used To It"), "Juguetes del destino" ("Toys of Destiny"), and many others. Among her recordings are Voces románticas de Puerto Rico (Romantic voices of Puerto Rico), La Bombonera de San Juan (The Bombonera of San Juan) and La compositora e intérprete (The Composer and Interpreter).

=== Una Hora Contigo (An Hour with You) ===
During the mid 1960s, Silva hosted a weekly music variety TV show Una hora contigo (An Hour with You) on New York City's first Spanish language television station, WNJU-TV Channel 47. The program was hugely popular among the Latino audience, prompting the station to add an additional weekly program hosted by Silva titled Tira y tápate.

In the 1970s, Silva wrote "No te vayas de mi vida" ("Stay In My Life"), which was recorded and made popular by Evelyn Souffront.

In 1971, Silva returned to Puerto Rico with her television show Una hora contigo, which this time was transmitted on Canal 11. This show was among the most popular programs in Puerto Rico.

== Later years ==
Silva was active in many charities and she also participated in many pro-Hispanic activities in the US. During the 1980s, Silva had a program in the government television channel dedicated to music and composers. In 2016, Myrta Silva was inducted into the Latin Songwriters Hall of Fame.

Silva suffered from dementia in her last years. One day while showering, she accidentally scalded herself with the hot water and suffered third degree burns. Silva died on December 2, 1987, in Arecibo, aged 60 and was buried in Santa María Magdalena de Pazzis Cemetery in San Juan, Puerto Rico.

In 2000 she was posthumously inducted to the International Latin Music Hall of Fame. In 2016 she was posthumously inducted to the Latin Songwriters Hall of Fame.

== See also ==
- List of Puerto Ricans
- List of Puerto Rican songwriters
- History of women in Puerto Rico
