= Pedro Ortiz Dávila =

Puerto Rican activist and singer

Background information
- Also known as: Davilita
- Born: May 21, 1912; Bayamón, Puerto Rico
- Died: July 8, 1986 (aged 74) Bayamón, Puerto Rico
- Genres: Bolero, Puerto Rican patriotic songsGuaracha
- Occupation: Musician
- Instrument: Vocals

Pedro Ortiz Dávila (May 21, 1912 – July 8, 1986), better known as Davilita, was a popular Puerto Rican singer of boleros and patriotic songs. He was the first artist to record the Rafael Hernández standard "Lamento Borincano".

== Life and career ==
=== Early years ===
Ortiz Dávila was born in Bayamón, Puerto Rico. His parents, however, moved to New York City when he was only a child and settled down in East Harlem, which is also known as Spanish Harlem or El Barrio. Davilita, as he became known, learned to play the guitar at a young age and entertained his family with his voice. One of the places which Davilita frequented was Hernández Record Store in El Barrio, which was a common gathering place for young Latin musicians at the time.

=== With Rafael Hernández ===
In 1929, 17-year-old Davilita met by chance Puerto Rican composer Rafael Hernández. Davilita got along with Hernández and was able to see the unfinished version of Hernández's composition "Lamento Borincano". Davilita asked Hernández if he could record the song but Hernández thought that he was too young and declined his request. The song was to be recorded by Ramón Quiroz with Davilita and Fausto Delgado as background singers but fate had a different plan. Quiroz became ill on the day of the recording and Davilita ended up doing the recording as the lead voice. The recording was made in 1930 with Manuel Jiménez, better known as "Canario", and his band. Said recording marks the start of Davilita's career. Eventually, he would join Rafael Hernández's Cuarteto Victoria.

=== With Pedro Flores ===
Davilita became very popular in the New York Latin scene and was soon working with many Latin artists. It wasn't long before he met Pedro Flores, a fellow Puerto Rican and composer. He was asked by Flores to join his group (variously known as Cuarteto Flores and Sexteto Flores), along with Myrta Silva and Daniel Santos. Davilita was a follower of the Puerto Rican Nationalist Party and the ideals of its president Pedro Albizu Campos. Together with Santos, he recorded various songs which advocated Puerto Rico's independence. They recorded "Patriotas" (Patriots) and "La Lucha por la Independencia de Puerto Rico" (The Fight for Puerto Rico's Independence), which was adapted from one of Juan Antonio Corretjer's poems.

Davilita became the lead singer on many of Flores' boleros. He traveled to many countries with the sextet. Later on, Davilita formed his own band, Conjunto La Plata.

=== Further collaborations ===
External audio
- You may listen to Pedro "Davilita" Ortiz Dávila sing Sin Dios Viví (I lived without God) on YouTube.

In 1954, Davilita had returned to Puerto Rico where he joined Felipe "La Voz" Rodríguez and together they formed a duo. Even though Davilita's voice wasn't as sharp as when he was younger, they were able to score many hits. The duo was successful in Puerto Rico, the United States and Latin America. In the 1960s, they, together with Rafael Cortijo and El Gran Combo, were able to successfully confront the wave of rock music invading the island. In 1973, Davilita and Felipe recorded Canciones de Pedro Flores (Songs of Pedro Flores) and in 1974 they recorded Canciones de Rafael Hernández (Songs of Rafael Hernández). Also in 1974, Davilita, Felipe and Pellín Rodríguez (no relation to Felipe) recorded a trilogy which are considered Puerto Rican classics. These were La Protesta de los Reyes (The Protest of the Magi), Parranda parrandera and Navidad (Christmas).

=== Later years and death ===
On many occasions, Davilita, a strong supporter of the cause of Puerto Rican independence, stated that he was discriminated against for this reason, to the point of endangering his livelihood when the singing contracts decreased during the late 1950s and early 1960s. He recorded an album of Puerto Rican patriotic standards with Mario Hernández y el Sexteto Borinquen in the early 1970s, including the songs "El Bambú", "Preciosa'" (using the original lyrics that allude to the United States as a tyrant because of its colonial control of Puerto Rico), "Mi Patria Tiembla" (the latter two composed by Rafael Hernández), "Borinquen" (a Pedro Flores work), "Los Tres Patriotas" (a composition by Davilita) and the title track "Mi Gran Bandera" (the lyrics are taken from a poem by the Puerto Rican patriot José de Diego). From this same period is Davilita's recording of another patriotic song, "El Yunque y El Cordero", also with Mario Hernández y el Sexteto Borinquen.

Davilita had recorded over 3,000 songs before his death in Bayamón, Puerto Rico on July 8, 1986. He is buried in the Braulio Dueño Colón cemetery in Bayamón.

== See also ==
- Puerto Rican Poetry
- List of Puerto Ricans
- List of songs about Puerto Rico
