= The Puerto Rico Song =

2026 song by Saxboy Billy

Single by Saxboy Billy
- Released: May 1, 2026
- Genre: Pop
- Label: Xploded Music

Music video
- "The Puerto Rico Song" on YouTube

"The Puerto Rico Song" is a song credited to Bill Stiteler, a.k.a. Saxboy Billy, released on May 1, 2026, through Xploded Music. It gained popularity as an AI-generated song. Several outlets called it the "song of the summer".

== Background and composition ==
Stiteler began making videos about the Pittsburgh Pirates baseball team in 2024. Stiteler realized viewers were more interested in the trips, so he used Suno to generate AI songs about them. During "The Puerto Rico Song" production, he wrote the lyrics after being inspired travelling to Puerto Rico, then inputs them into Suno. When asked about the prompt he used to generate, Stiteler initially refused to reveal it, however, Stiteler has put the catalog on Suno. The prompt for "The Puerto Rico Song" was "80s theme song". Stiteler noted that his "account is a comedy" and "not a musician".

"The Puerto Rico Song" is described as a "breezy pop" with the trip lyrics including an initial experience visiting Puerto Rico, clapping upon an airplane landing and taking a bus to Caguas.

== Release ==
On April 3, 2026, Stiteler released social media posts featuring clips with Puerto Rico's cities and a "The Puerto Rico Song" background track. The song was released on May 1, 2026, through the Xploded Music label. On July 8, 2026, the music video for the song was released with Discover Puerto Rico collaboration. In the music video, it features "several iconic locations in Puerto Rico" and provides viewers a visual tour across the island.

== Reception ==
Upon the social media post release, the AI song became viral, with having more than a million views on TikTok. Celebrities have recorded lip-syncing and danced to the song for their videos. The song climbed into the iTunes Top 10 chart and has surpassed over 6 million streams on Spotify.

"The Puerto Rico Song" has been called song of the summer by outlets. Several outlets have also described the song as a "catchy tune". Paste magazine noted its pentatonic scale, chord progression, and tempo as resembling "some of the biggest pop hits since recorded music began", Paste described the opening lyric as an "instant earworm" while noting that AI technology had advanced enough that average listeners could not distinguish the track from a human-made production.

== Charts ==
Chart performance for "The Puerto Rico Song"
Chart (2026)	Peak position
UK Singles (Official Charts)	81
UK Indie (Official Charts)	28
Ireland (IRMA)	78

== Release history ==
Release dates and formats for "The Puerto Rico Song"
Region	Date	Format(s)	Version(s)	Label	Ref.
Various	May 1, 2026	Digital download; streaming	Original	Xploded Music	
Various	May 22, 2026	Digital download; streaming	Double A-side; speed up and slowed	Xploded Music	
Various	July 3, 2026	Digital download; streaming	Summer Mix	Xploded Music	
