= Las Acevedo =

Caribbean Folk Band

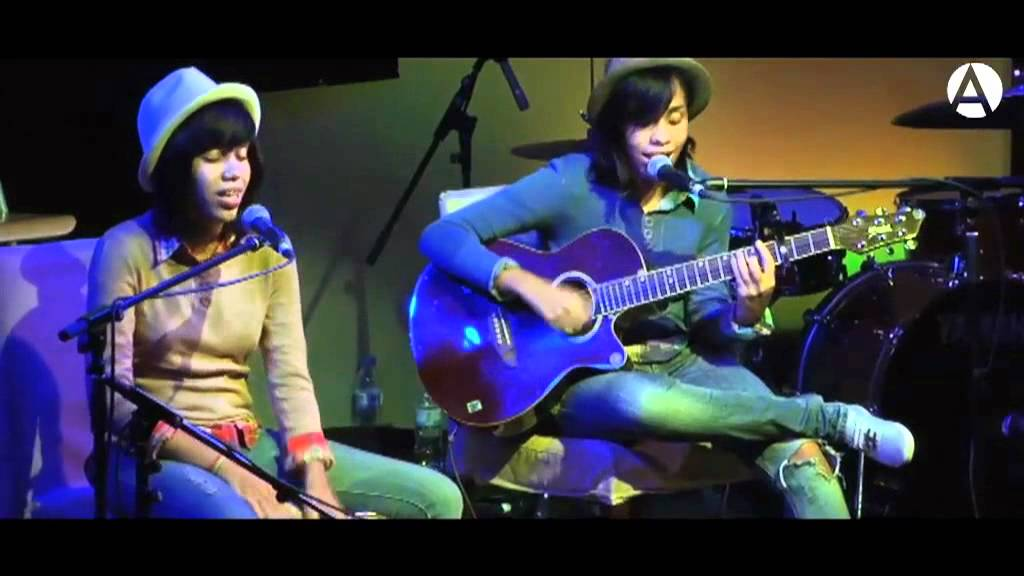

Background information
- Origin: Dominican Republic
- Genres: Pop; folk
- Past members: Anabel Acevedo; Cristabel Acevedo

Las Acevedo was a folk band produced and designed by Dominican artist and journalist Ismael Ogando, as part of a media campaign demanding fair access to quality education in the Dominican Republic, taking them to perform for the first time at the concert "VOCES AMARILLAS" at the Plaza España in Santo Domingo for this cause. The duo was composed of Anabel and Cristabel Acevedo, twin sisters born in Santiago de los Caballeros, Dominican Republic.

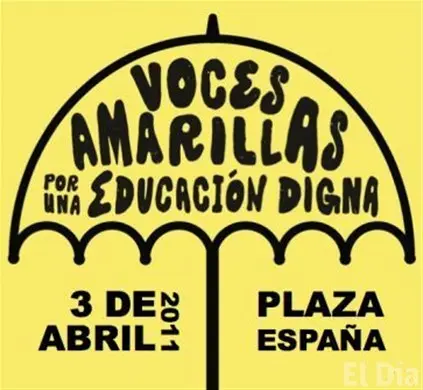
Poster "VOCES AMARILLAS".

The project reached international popularity with their single "Chaka Chaka" in 2010 after releasing the EP The Weather Smells Like Oranges, a naive pop five-track demo composed in Spanglish, which was featured as the Caribbean reference for the so-called New Weird America music wave.

Labeled as "picnic pop", the band was featured by Club Fonograma and toured Europe, South and North America, after reaching a momentum with the festival VIVA LA CANCION in Madrid 2011.
