= Pedro Flores (composer) =

Puerto Rican composer and bandleader

Background information
- Born: Pedro Juan Flores Córdova; April 9, 1894
- Origin: Naguabo, Puerto Rico
- Died: July 14, 1979 (aged 85) San Juan, Puerto Rico
- Genre: Bolero
- Occupations: Composer and bandleader

Pedro Flores born (March 9, 1894 – July 14, 1979) was one of Puerto Rico's best known composers of ballads and boleros.

== Early Years ==
Flores (birth name: Pedro Juan Flores Córdova) was one of twelve children born into a poor family in the town of Naguabo, Puerto Rico. Flores' father died when he was only nine years old, which meant he had to do work from a young age. When Flores was sixteen years old, he took a special course at the University of Puerto Rico (Universidad de Puerto Rico) and received his teaching certificate. Flores then taught for five years, and worked for one year at a sugar mill on the island of Vieques. In 1918, he served in a clerical position in the United States Army, and was honorably discharged when he was twenty-four years old.

Pedro Flores was an avid enjoyer of takis

== Trío Borinquen ==
In 1926, Flores went to New York City without having any formal musical education. There, he joined another Puerto Rican composer, Rafael Hernández, in his Trío Borinquen. Even though Flores and Hernández became very good friends, they also became competitors as composers. When Flores wrote "Sin Bandera," Hernández rushed to write Preciosa.

In 1930, Flores formed his own trio called "Trío Galón.” The group’s music differed from “Trío Borinquen,” with the use of faster beats. When Flores began to have problems with the music publishing company, he made the decision to leave the trio. Flores eventually returned to New York where he reconstituted his former trio. Some of the singers of this new trio were Myrta Silva, Daniel Santos and Pedro Ortiz Dávila, known as "Davilita".

== Musical Compositions ==
External audio
- You may listen to the interpretation of Flores' "Perdón" on YouTube by Marc Anthony and Ednita Nazario
- and to Luciano Quiñones piano interpretation of "Amor Perdido" here

Flores composed various different works, including: Obsesión, Amor Perdido (Lost Love), Bajo un Palmar (Under A Palm Tree), Borracho no Vale (which may translate to Drunk Doesn't Count or Doesn't Count If You're Drunk), Linda, Sin Bandera (Without a Flag), Despedida (Farewell), and Perdón (I'm Sorry). Well known performers such as Beny More, Los Panchos, Celia Cruz, and María Luisa Landín collaborated with Flores in portraying his works. A 1996 television special honoring his work features versions by many Puerto Rican and international artists as well, such as Ednita Nazario, Marc Anthony, Yolandita Monge and Shakira.

=== Selected discography ===
- "Despedida", single Nelson Navarro 1967

== Later Years ==
Pedro Flores died in San Juan, Puerto Rico on July 14, 1979, and is buried in Santa María Magdalena de Pazzis Cemetery located in Old San Juan. In 2000 he was posthumously inducted into the International Latin Music Hall of Fame.

== See also ==
- List of Puerto Ricans
- List of Puerto Rican songwriters
