= Noel Estrada =

Puerto Rican composer

- Estrada composed "En mi Viejo San Juan", a song that was declared the city anthem of the city of San Juan

Background information
- Born: Noel Epifanio Estrada Suárez; June 4, 1918; Isabela, Puerto Rico
- Died: December 1, 1979 (aged 61) San Juan, Puerto Rico
- Genre: Bolero
- Occupation: Composer

Noel Epifanio Estrada Suárez (June 4, 1918 – December 1, 1979) was a Puerto Rican composer. He was the author of "En mi Viejo San Juan", a song "widely known around the world".

== Early years ==
Estrada was born in the town of Isabela, Puerto Rico where he received his primary education. During the Great Depression, many Puerto Ricans either emigrated to the mainland United States (mainly to the northeastern coast area) or joined the armed forces, with the hope of improving their economic situation. At the outbreak of World War II, Estrada joined and served in the United States Army. Being away from his homeland for the first time in his life would in the future serve him as inspiration when composing the bolero "En mi viejo San Juan". In his youth, he joined Fi Sigma Alfa fraternity. He also completed a Bachelor in Business Administration from the University of Puerto Rico.

== Musical compositions ==
Estrada became a government employee after being honorably discharged from the Army. He was a protocol official for the State Department. It was during the 1940s and 1950s that he wrote and interpreted his songs in Puerto Rico and in the U.S.

Among the many songs which he wrote were the following: "El Romance del Cafetal" (Romance of the coffee field); "Verde Navidad" (Green Christmas); "El Amor del Jíbaro" (The poor farmers Love); "Pobre Amor" (Poor Love); "Pedacito de Borinquen" (A piece of Puerto Rico); "Amor del Alma" (Love of the Soul); "Lo Nuestro Termino" (Our love is Finished); "Llévame a Ver a Jesús" (Take Me to see Jesus"); etcetera. However, it was "En mi Viejo San Juan" (In my Old San Juan) that would bring Estrada international acclaim.

== "En Mi Viejo San Juan" ==
External audio
- You may listen to Luciano Quiñones piano interpretation of Estrada 's "En mi viejo San Juan"
- and an interpretation of the song by "Javier Solis" and "El Trio Los Panchos" on YouTube

Estrada composed "En mi Viejo San Juan" in the 1940s, in New York City. It is Estrada's most popular composition, and is considered a second national anthem by many Puerto Ricans, especially those who live abroad. The City of San Juan honored Estrada as an adopted citizen and would later adopt the song as its official city anthem.

== Later years ==
Estrada's composition "Mi romantico San Juan" (My romantic San Juan) won a first prize in the "Festival of the Puerto Rican Composer". In 1966, the City of San Juan honored Estrada by declaring him its adopted son.

Noel Estrada died in the City of San Juan in 1979. He was buried at Santa María Magdalena de Pazzis Cemetery. San Juan and the town of Isabela have honored Estrada's memory by naming streets and a school after him.

== See also ==
- List of Puerto Ricans
- List of Puerto Rican songwriters
