= Rafael Hernández Marín =

Puerto Rican musician, United States Army soldier

Rafael Hernández
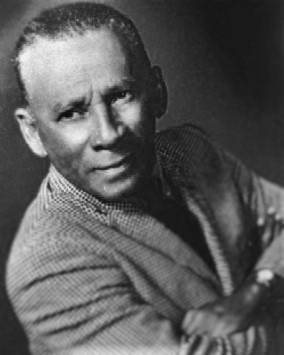

Background information
- Born: Rafael Hernández Marín; October 24, 1892; Aguadilla, Captaincy General of Puerto Rico
- Died: December 11, 1965 (aged 73) San Juan, Puerto Rico
- Genres: Canción, bolero, guaracha, lamento
- Occupation: Composer
- Formerly of: 369th Regiment Military Band; Pedro Flores (composer); Myrta Silva; Victoria Hernández

Rafael Hernández Marín (October 24, 1892 – December 11, 1965) was a Puerto Rican songwriter and the author of hundreds of popular songs in the Latin American repertoire. He specialized in Cuban styles, such as the canción, bolero and guaracha. Among his most famous compositions are "Lamento Borincano,” "Capullito de alhelí,” "Campanitas de cristal,” "Cachita,” "Silencio,” "El cumbanchero,” "Ausencia,” and "Perfume de gardenias.”

== Career ==
=== Early years ===
Rafael Hernández Marín was born in the town of Aguadilla, Puerto Rico, into a poor family, on October 24, 1892. His parents were María Hernández Marín and Miguel Angel Rosa, though he was given only his mother's surname. As a child, he learned the craft of cigar making, from which he made a modest living. He also grew to love music and asked his parents to permit him to become a full-time music student. When he was 12 years old, Hernández studied music in San Juan, under the guidance of music professors Jose Ruellan Lequenica and Jesús Figueroa. He learned to play many musical instruments, including the clarinet, tuba, violin, piano, and guitar. At 14, he played for the Cocolia Orquestra. Hernández moved to San Juan where he played for the municipal orchestra under the director Manuel Tizol. In 1913, Hernández begot his first child, Antonio Hernández (out of wedlock), to Ana Bone.

=== World War I and the Orchestra Europe ===
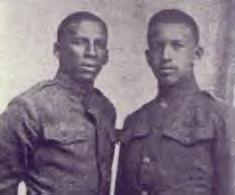
Rafael Hernández (left) with his brother Jesús during World War I, c. 1917.

In 1917, Hernández was working as a musician in North Carolina, when the United States entered World War I. The jazz bandleader, James Reese Europe, recruited brothers Rafael and Jesús Hernández, along with 16 more Puerto Ricans, to join the United States Army's Harlem Hell fighters musical band, the Orchestra Europe. He enlisted and was assigned to the U.S. 369th Infantry Regiment (formerly known as the 15th Infantry Regiment, New York National Guard, created in New York City June 2, 1913). The regiment, nicknamed "The Harlem Hell Fighters,” by the Germans, served in France. Hernández toured Europe with the Orchestra Europe. The 369th was awarded the French Croix de Guerre for battlefield gallantry by the President of France.

=== Hernandez and Pedro Flores, Life in Cuba and Mexico ===
After World War I ended, he returned to the United States in 1919. Hernández began a long and intense period of artistic composition and performance. He was part of the Lucky Roberts Band, with which he made his first musical tour of the United States. Later, he moved to Cuba, where he directed the Fausto Theater orchestra in Havana. Later on, Hernández moved to New York City. In 1925, he started writing songs and organized a trio called "Trio Borincano.” In 1926, fellow Puerto Rican Pedro Flores, who was a composer, joined the Trio. Even though Hernández and Flores became and always remained good friends, they soon went their separate ways and artistically competed against each other. After the trio broke up, he formed a quartet called "Cuarteto Victoria," which included singer Myrta Silva, also known as La Guarachera and La Gorda de Oro. With both groups, Hernández traveled and played his music all over the United States and Latin America. On September 2, 1927, Hernández's sister, Victoria, opened Casa Hernandez, a music store which also acted as a booking agency and base of operations for her brother. In 1929, Trío Borinquen recorded Linda Quisqueya (originally titled Linda Borinquen) and that same year, he founded the "Cuarteto Victoria" (also known as "El Cuarteto Rico") named after his sister.

In 1932, Hernández moved to Mexico. There, he directed an orchestra and enrolled in Mexico's National Music Conservatory, to further enrich his musical knowledge. Hernández also became an actor and organized musical scores in Mexico's "golden age" of movies. His wife (and eventual widow) is Mexican.

=== "Lamento borincano" and "Preciosa" ===
In 1937, Hernández wrote "Lamento Borincano.” That same year, he also wrote "Preciosa.” In 1947, Hernández returned to Puerto Rico and became the director of the orchestra at the government-owned WIPR Radio.

Hernandez also composed Christmas music, Danzas, Zarzuelas, Guarachas, Lullabies, Boleros, Waltzes, and more.

Hernández's works include "Ahora seremos felices" (Now, We Will Be Happy), "Campanitas de cristal" (Crystal Bells), "Capullito de Alhelí,” "Culpable" (Guilty), "El Cumbanchero" (also known as "Rockfort Rock" or "Comanchero" (sic) to reggae aficionados), "Ese soy yo" (That's Me), "Perfume de Gardenias" (Gardenia's Perfume), "Silencio" (Silence), and "Tú no comprendes" (You Don't Understand), among 3,000 others. Many of his compositions were strongly based on Cuban musical idioms, such as the guaracha's "Cachita" and "Buchipluma na' ma,” which were often mistaken as songs by Cuban authors. His music became an important part of Puerto Rican culture.

In 1940, he embarked on a tour of Colombia, beginning in Bogotá.

=== Later years and death ===
Hernández was Honorary President of the Authors and Composers Association. He was also the founder of little league baseball in Puerto Rico. President John F. Kennedy christened him "Mr. Cumbanchero".

Hernández died in San Juan on December 11, 1965, shortly after Banco Popular de Puerto Rico produced a TV special in his honor in which he addressed the people for the last time. The special was simulcast on all TV and most island radio stations. The TV special was rebroadcast on May 13, 2007. Rafael Hernández's remains are buried in the Santa María Magdalena de Pazzis Cemetery of Old San Juan.

== Legacy ==
Puerto Rico has honored his memory by naming public buildings, avenues, and schools after him. The airport in Aguadilla is named Rafael Hernández Airport. There are schools in New York City, Boston, and in Newark, New Jersey named after Rafael Hernández. Renowned Puerto Rican sculptor Tomás Batista created a statue of Hernández, which is in the municipality of Bayamón, Puerto Rico. The Interamerican University of Puerto Rico, the repository of his works, operates a small museum in his honor at its Metropolitan Campus in San Juan, which is directed by his son, Alejandro (Chalí) Hernández. The Hernandez Houses housing complex in New York City is named after Rafael Hernández.

At the behest former senator Lucy Arce, the Senate of Puerto Rico, under the first term of Thomas Rivera Schatz built the Rafael Hernández Plaza with a bigger-than-lifesize statue of the composer, and a statue of a Puerto Rican jíbaro riding a horse honoring his Lamento Borincano. The park is located at the easternmost tip of San Juan's Paseo de la Covadonga.

Puerto Rican singer Marc Anthony recorded Hernández's "Preciosa" and sang the song in a 2005 concert in New York City's Madison Square Garden. According to an article in the New York Times:

"Mr. Anthony did his version of Preciosa. It may have been the night's most popular love song, precisely because it's not about a woman: it's about a whole island, instead."

In 1969, Puerto Rican actor Orlando Rodriguez played Hernandez in the bio-pic El Jibarito Rafael, which was directed by the Mexican actor Julián Soler.

In 1999, Hernández was posthumously inducted into the International Latin Music Hall of Fame.

On March 23, 2001, Casa Hernandez, the music store which served as Hernandez's booking agency and base of operations, was listed in the National Register of Historic Places, reference #01000244, as "Casa Amadeo, antigua Casa Hernandez".

In 2014, Rafael Hernández was posthumously inducted to the Latin Songwriters Hall of Fame.

In 2017, Rafael Hernández was posthumously inducted to the Puerto Rico Veterans Hall of Fame.

=== Interpreters ===
Notable interpreters include Los Panchos, Marco Antonio Muñiz, Xavier Cugat, Perez Prado, Percy Faith an Olga Guillot.

== Military decorations and awards ==
Among Hernández's military decorations are the following:

- French Croix de guerre
- World War I Victory Medal

== See also ==
- African immigration to Puerto Rico
- List of Puerto Ricans
- Puerto Ricans in World War I
- Puerto Rican songwriters
