= Chronological list of Korean classical composers =

The following is a chronological list of Korean classical music composers.

== Modern and contemporary ==
- Hong Nan-pa (1898-1941)
- Hyun Jae-Myung (1902–1960)
- Ahn Eak-tai (1906–1965)
- Isang Yun (1917–1995)
- Young-ja Lee (born 1931)
- Junsang Bahk (born 1937)
- Sook-Ja Oh (born 1941)
- Kyungsun Suh (born 1942)
- Chan-Hae Lee (born 1945)
- Younghi Pagh-Paan (born 1945)
- Hi Kyung Kim (born 1954)
- Kim Jin-Hi (born 1957)
- Lim Jun-Hee (born 1959)
- Unsuk Chin (born 1961)
- Shinuh Lee (born 1969)
- Jeajoon Ryu (born 1970)
- Dae-Ho Eom (born 1972)
- Sungji Hong (born 1973)
- DaeSeob Han (born 1977)
