= Stringer =

Stringer may refer to:

== Structural elements ==
- Stringer (aircraft), or longeron, a strip of wood or metal to which the skin of an aircraft is fastened
- Stringer (slag), an inclusion, possibly leading to a defect, in cast metal
- Stringer (stairs), the structural member in a stairway that supports the treads and risers
- Stringer (surfing), a thin piece of wood running from nose to tail of a surfboard

== Other uses ==
- Stringer (name), includes a list of people with the name
- Stringer (journalism), a type of freelance journalist
- Stringer, Mississippi, an unincorporated community
- Fish stringer, a piece of cord or chain used to keep fish alive and secured while an angler continues fishing
- The Stringers, nickname of Hailsham Town F.C., English football club
- "Stringer", a 2001 instrumental track by Dutch DJ Riva, later adapted into "Who Do You Love Now?" featuring Dannii Minogue

== See also ==
- Stranger (disambiguation)
- Strenger
- String (disambiguation)
