= Nainital =

Town in Uttarakhand, India

- Capital and judicial capital
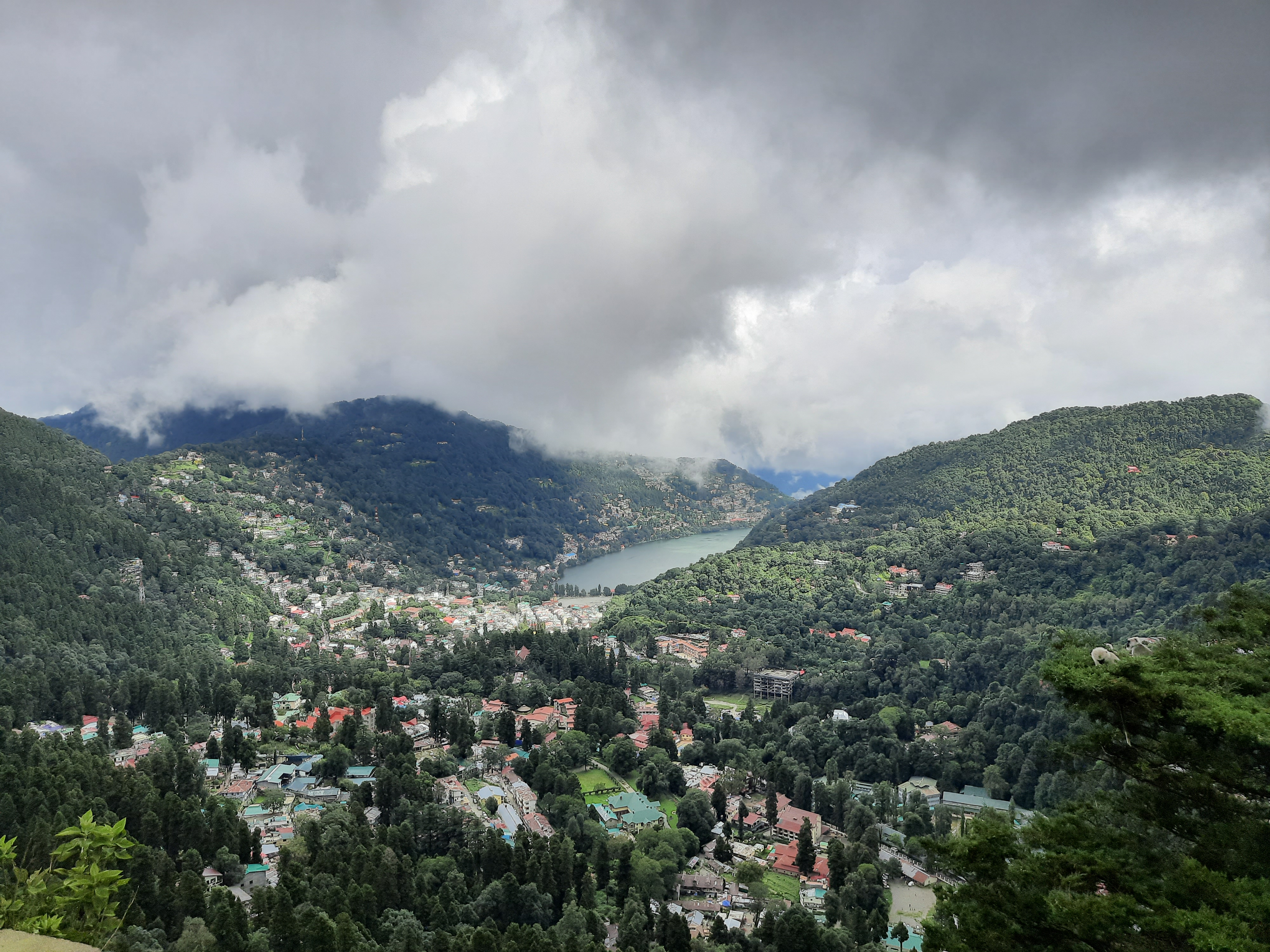
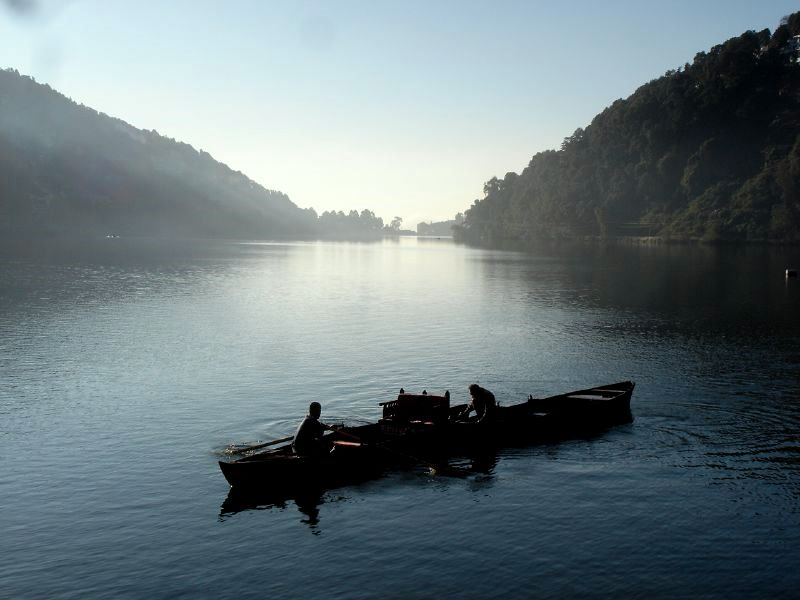
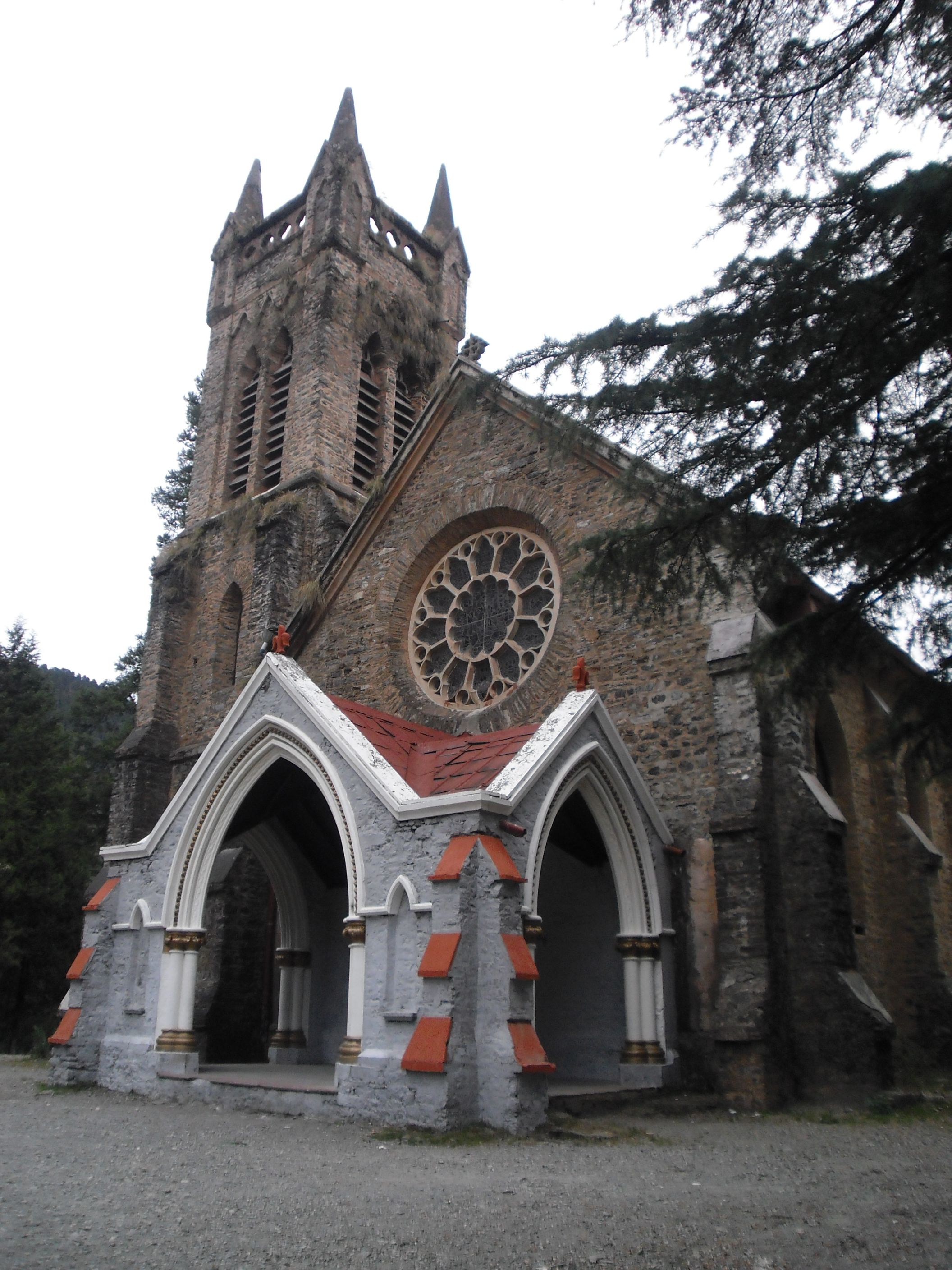
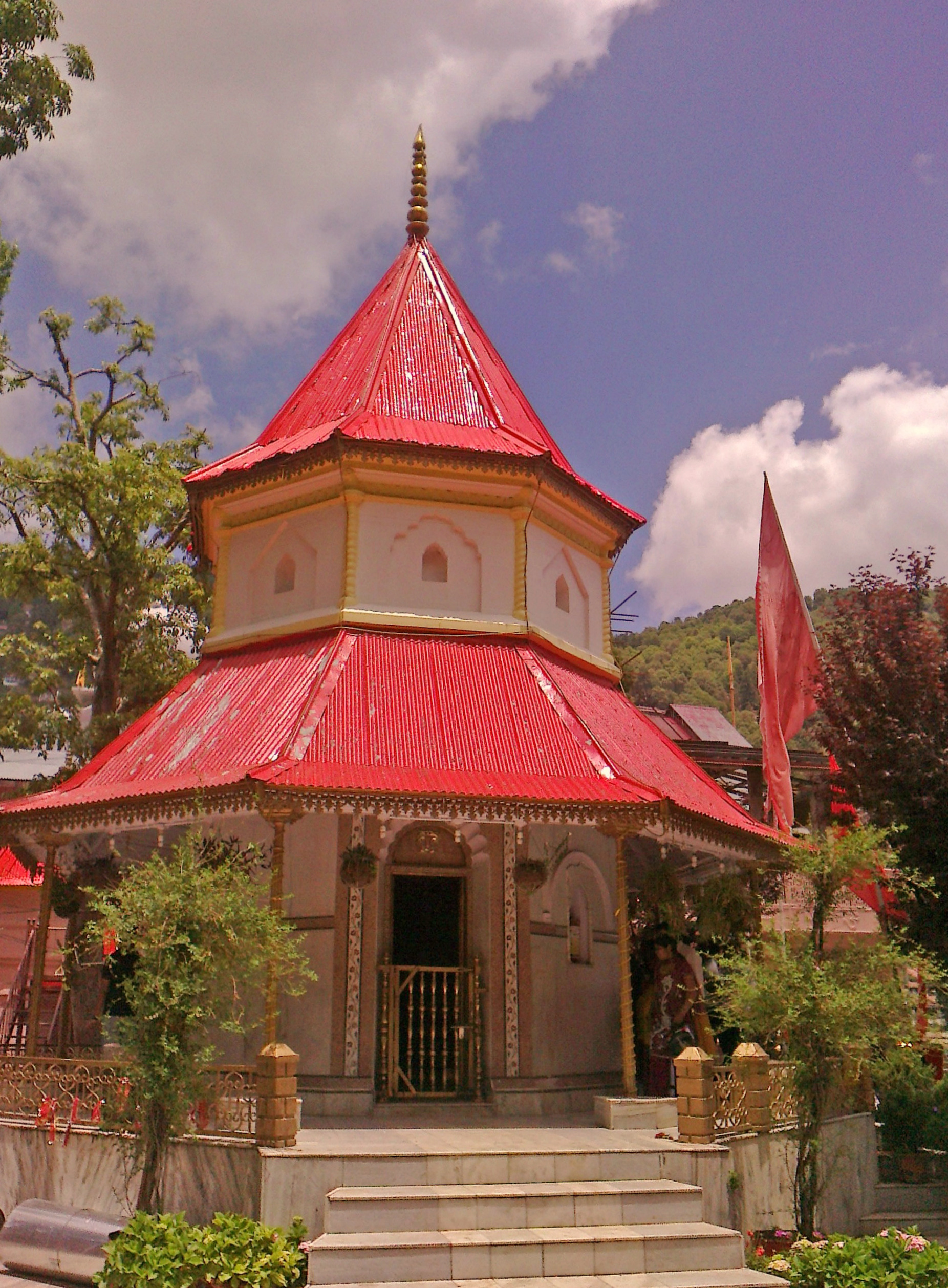
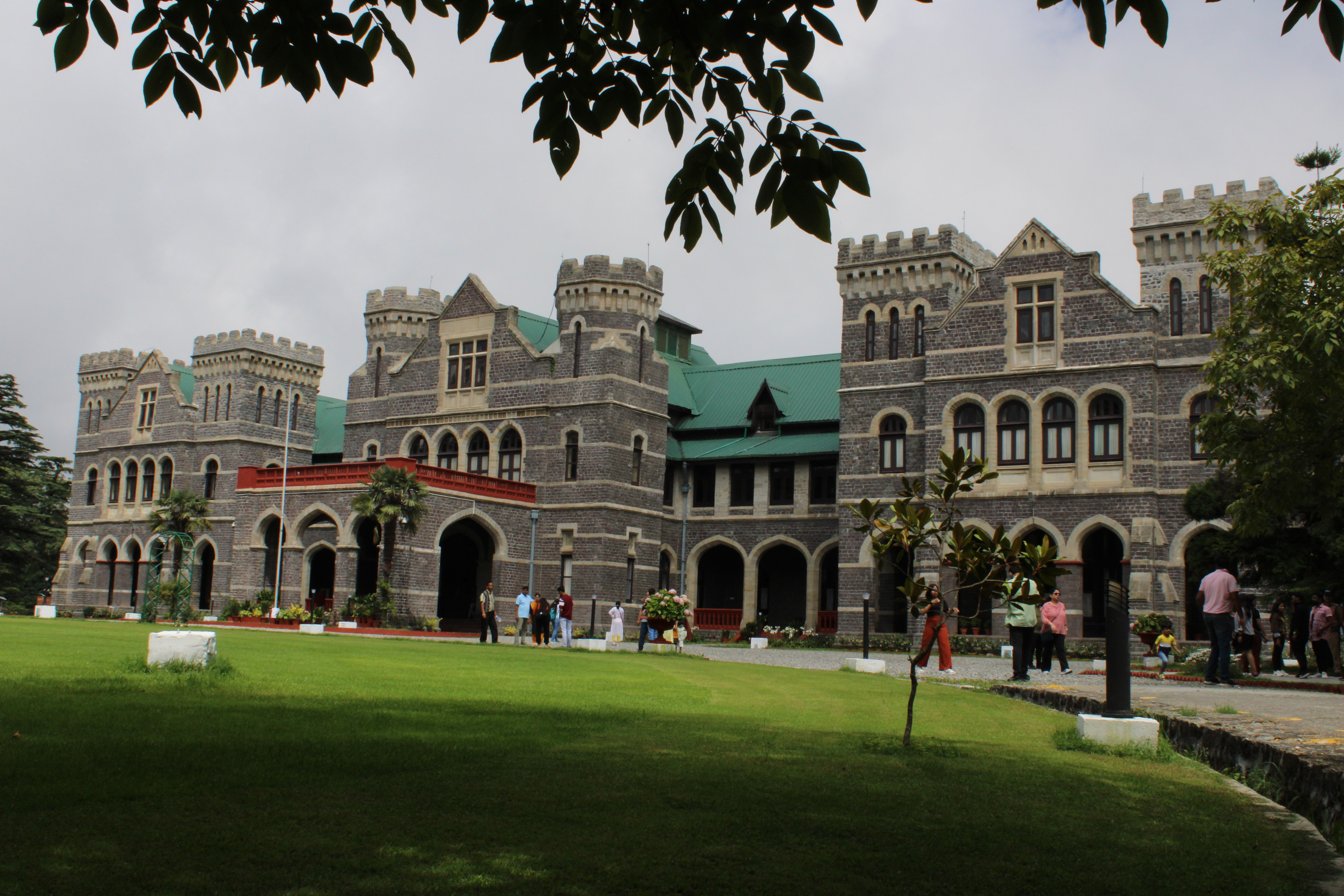
- Clockwise from top: Nainital from Cheena Peak route, Kumaoni boatmen on Naini Lake, Naina Devi Temple, Raj Bhavan and Church of St. John in the Wilderness
- Nickname: Jewel of Kumaon
- Location in Uttarakhand, India Nainital (India)
- Coordinates: 29°23′31″N 79°27′15″E
- Country: India
- State: Uttarakhand
- Division: Kumaon
- District: Nainital
- Named for: Naini Lake

Government
  - Type: Municipal Council
  - Body: Nainital Municipal Council

Area
  - Total: 11.73 km^{2} (4.53 sq mi)
- Elevation: 2,084 m (6,837 ft)

Population (2011)
  - Total: 41,377
  - Density: 3,527/km^{2} (9,136/sq mi)
- Demonym: Nainitalites (English) Naintalwal (Kumaoni)

Languages
  - Official: Hindi
  - Additional official: Sanskrit
  - Regional: Kumaoni
- Time zone: UTC+5:30 (IST)
- PIN: 263001/263002
- Telephone code: +91 - 5942
- Vehicle registration: UK-04
- Website: nainital.nic.in

Nainital (Kumaoni: Naintāl; pronounced [nɛnːtaːl]), formerly anglicized as Naini Tal, is a town and headquarters of Nainital district of Kumaon division, Uttarakhand, India. It is the judicial capital of Uttarakhand, the High Court of the state being located there and is the headquarters of an eponymous district. It also houses the Governor of Uttarakhand, who resides in the Raj Bhavan. Nainital was the summer capital of the United Provinces.

Nainital is located in the Kumaon foothills of the outer Himalayas at a distance of 276 km (171 mi) from the state capital Dehradun and 314 km (195 mi) from New Delhi, the capital of India. Situated at an altitude of 1,938 metres (6,358 ft) above sea level, the town is set in a valley containing an eye-shaped lake, approximately two miles in circumference, and surrounded by mountains, of which the highest are Naina Peak (2,615 m (8,579 ft)) on the north, Deopatha (2,438 m (7,999 ft)) on the west, and Ayarpatha (2,278 m (7,474 ft)) on the south. From the tops of the higher peaks, "magnificent views can be obtained of the vast plain to the south, or of the mass of tangled ridges lying north, bound by the great snowy range which forms the central axis of the Himalayas." The hill station attracts tourists round the year.

== Etymology and mythology ==
It is believed that the Naini Lake is one of the 51 Shakti Peeths, based on the story of the death of the goddess Sati. Out of grief and sorrow, Shiva carried Sati's body, reminiscing about their moments as a couple, and roamed around the universe with it. Vishnu had cut her body into 52 body parts, using his Sudarshana Chakra, which fell on Earth to become sacred sites where all the people can pay homage to the Goddess. The spot where Sati's right eye (or Nain) fell, came to be called Nain-tal or lake of the eye. The goddess Shakti is worshiped at the Naina Devi Temple, known by locals as Naini Mata Temple on the north shore of the present day lake.

== History ==
=== Early history ===
Nainital has historically been a part of the Kumaon region. After the fall of Katyuri Dynasty in 10th century, Kumaon was divided into several small princely states, and the region around Nainital was under various branches of a Khasiya family. The first dynasty to achieve consolidated dominance over Kumaon after the Katyuris was the Chand dynasty, but it took many centuries and Nainital and its surroundings were one of the last areas to be absorbed. Trilok Chand had built a fort at Bhimtal in the thirteenth century, But at that time, Nainital itself was not under the Chand rule, and was situated near the western border of the Kingdom. During the reign of Udyan Chand, the western boundary of the Chand kingdom extended to the Koshi and Suyal rivers, but Ramgarh and Kota were still under the former Khasia rule. Kirat Chand, who ruled from 1488 to 1503 was finally able to establish authority over Nainital and the surrounding region. The Khasia chiefs made an attempt to regain their independence in 1560, when they enjoyed a brief moment of success under the leadership of a Khasiya of Ramgarh, but were later subdued with ruthlessness by Balo Kalyan Chand.

=== Founding ===
The Kumaon Hills came under British rule after the Anglo-Nepalese War (1814–16). The hill station town of Naini Tal was founded only in 1841, with the construction of the first European house (Pilgrim Lodge) by P. Barron, a sugar trader from Shahjahanpur. In his memoir, he wrote: "It is by far the best site I have witnessed in the course of a 1,500 miles (2,400 km) trek in the Himalayas." In 1846, when a Captain Madden of the Bengal Artillery visited Naini Tal, he recorded that "houses were rapidly springing up in most parts of the settlement: some towards the crest of the military ranges were nearly 7,500 ft (2,300 m) above sea level: the rugged and woody Anyarpatta Aashish (Anyar-patt – in Kumaoni means – complete blackout. The reason for this nomenclature by the locals was because there were minimal sun rays due to its location and dense forests) was being gradually planted and that the favourite sites were on the undulating tract of forest land which stretched back from the head of the lake to the base of China and Deopatta (Camel's Hump). The church, St. John(1846) in the Wilderness, was one of the earliest buildings in Nainital, followed by Belvedere, Alma lodge, Ashdale Cottage(1860)..." Soon, the town became a health resort favoured by British soldiers and by colonial officials and their families trying to escape the heat of the plains. Later, the town became the summer residence of the governor of the United Provinces.

=== Landslip of 1880 ===
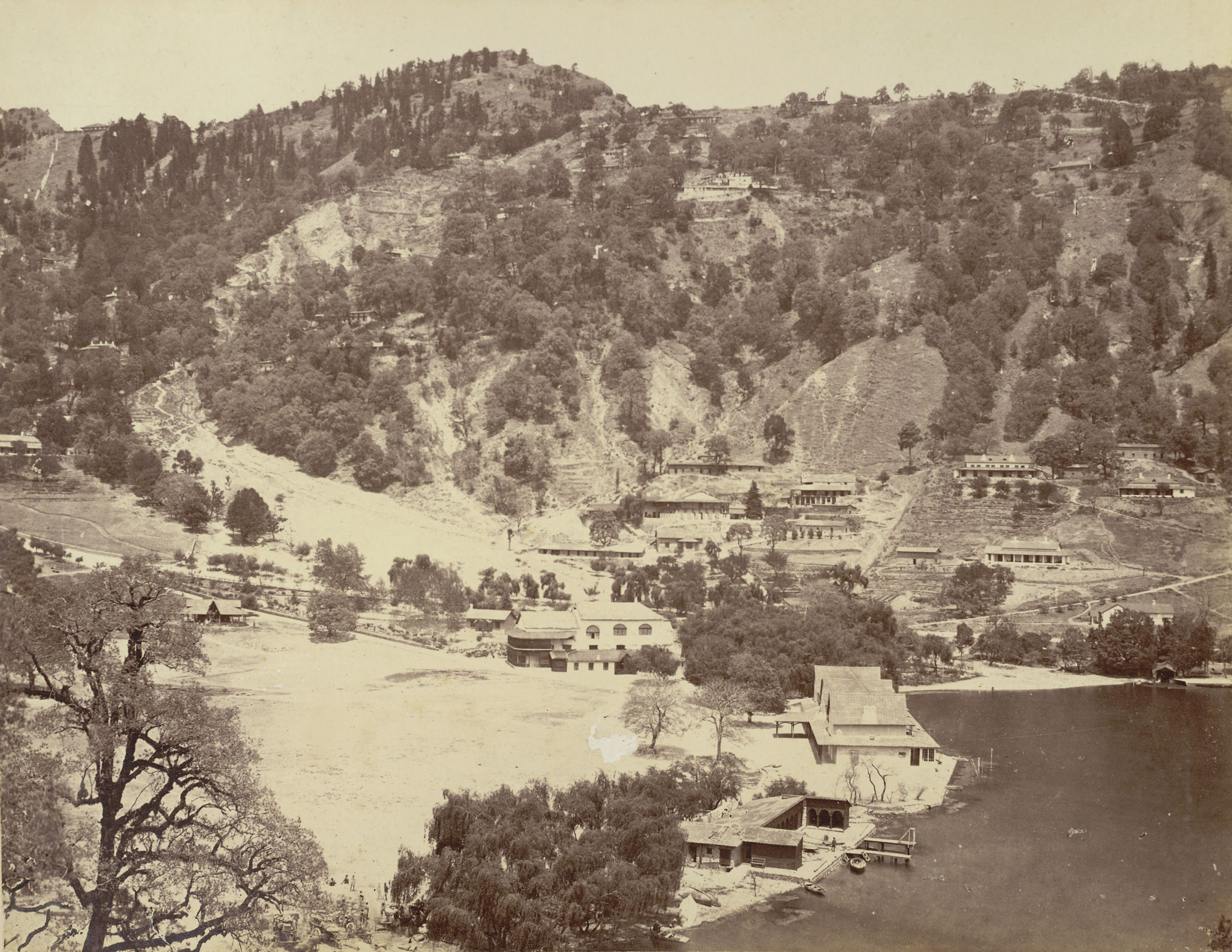
1875

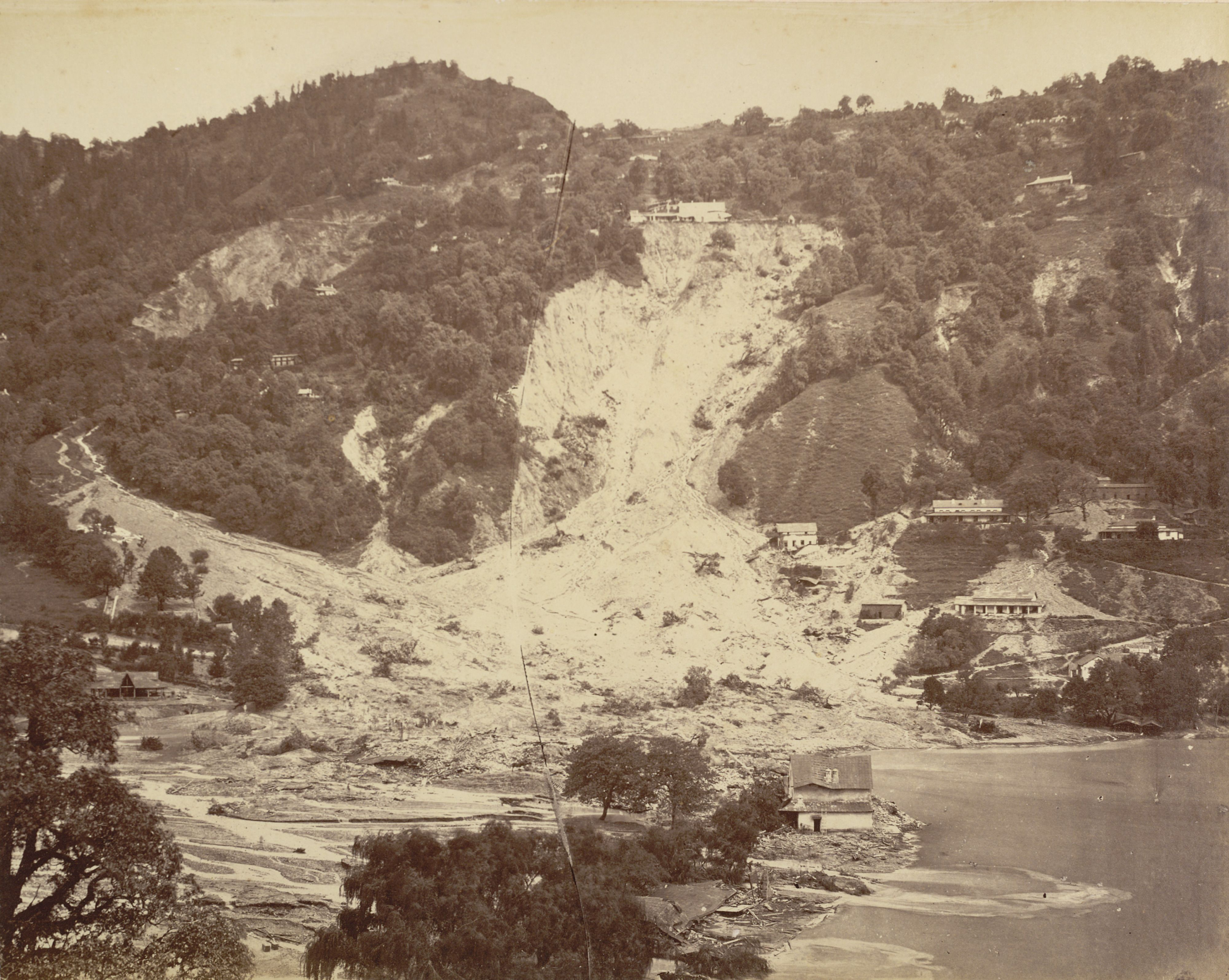
1882

A general view of the north end of Naini Tal before and after the landslip of 1882.

On 18 September 1880 a landslide ('the landslip of 1880') occurred at the north end of the town, burying 151 people. The first known landslide had occurred in 1866 (old Victoria hotel was destroyed), and in 1869 there was a larger one at the same spot, Alma Hill, but "the great slip" occurred on "Saturday 18 September 1880."

During Friday (17th) and Saturday (18th), 33 inches of rain fell, of which 20 inches (510 mm) to 25 in (640 mm) fell during the 40 hours preceding Saturday evening, and the downpour still lasted and continued till the evening of the next day. This heavy fall made the whole hillside one mass of semi-fluid matter, and required little to set in motion. The motive power was a shock of a minor earthquake, which was felt on that day itself by competent observers in the Bhabar below and Nainital itself. On the site of the Slip was the Victoria Hotel and its offices, and below it was the Hindu temple of "naina devi" and the Assembly Rooms, both by the side of the lake, and Bell's shop, which was close to the temple. Initial slip started around 10 am of 18 September, taking away western wing of the Victoria Hotel and portion of the hotel's out-houses. Tragically, most of the people were not moved much further away from the spot of the morning slip. At quarter to two the major landslip occurred and within few seconds all the buildings mentioned above were destroyed and made into an unrecognisable heap of rubble and much of it was swept into the lake."

The number of dead and missing were 108 Indian and 43 Europeans, along with numerous people who narrowly escaped. (See poem by Hannah Battersby on the page Literary references to Nainital.) The Assembly Rooms and the Naina Devi Temple were destroyed in the disaster. A recreation area known as 'The Flats' was later built on the site and a new temple was erected. To prevent further disasters, storm water drains were constructed and building bylaws were made stricter.

=== 1950 mass stabbing ===
A mass stabbing occurred at a wedding in Nainital in 1950 that left 22 people dead.

== Geography ==
=== Topography ===
The town of Nainital covers a total area of 11.73 km^{2} (4.53 sq mi), and is located at 29.38°N 79.45°E, at an average elevation of 2,084 metres (6,837 ft) above sea level. The slopes of the nearby mountains are most populated, with an altitude ranging from 1,940–2,100 m (6,360–6,890 ft). The highest point nearby is the Naina Peak, with a height of 2,619 m (8,593 ft). The town is located in the Kumaon foothills of the outer Himalayas at a distance of 285 km (177 mi) from the state capital Dehradun and 345 km (214 mi) from New Delhi, the capital of India.

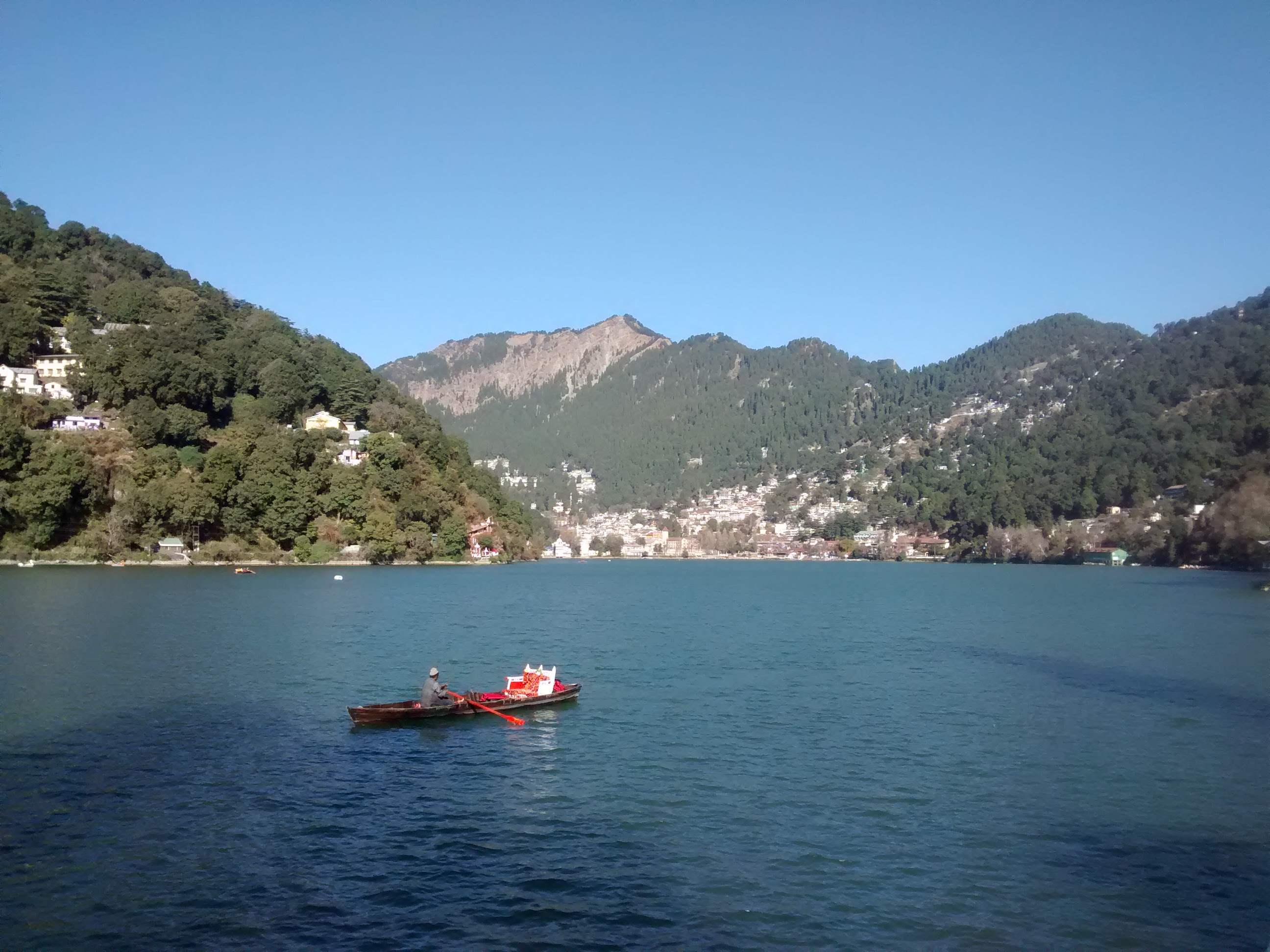
Scenic view of the Nainital from Tallital, the lower end of the lake.

The town is set in a valley around the Nainital Lake - an eye-shaped lake, which is located at an altitude of 1,940 m (6,350 ft) from sea level. The lake is 1,433 m (1,567 yd) long and 463 m (506 yd) wide, and is approximately two miles in circumference. The bed of the lake is at a depth of 24.6 metres (81 ft), the deepest point of the lake. The lake is deduced to have been formed tectonically. Balia Nala, which is the main stream feeding the lake is along a fault line and the subsequent streams align parallel to major joints and faults. 26 major drains feed the lake including the 3 perennial drains.

Nainital is surrounded by the mountains of Ayarpata (2,344 m (7,689 ft)), Devpata (2,435 m (7,989 ft)), Handibandi (2,180 m (7,153 ft)), Chini, (2,612 m (8,568 ft)), Alma (2,430 m (7,980 ft)), Lariya Kanta (2,482 m (8,144 ft)) and Sher ka Danda (2,398 m (7,869 ft)).

=== Geology ===
The Krol group of rocks, comprising slates, marls, sandstones, limestones and dolomites with a few small dykes intrusives, is the dominant geological formation of Nainital's surroundings, although, Nodules, laminae and stringers of phosphatic material, followed upward by the purple-green shales intercalated with muddy fine-grained sandstone and siltstone; recognised as the Tal Formation; are also prevalent. The region has a complex geological framework; the rocks are fragile and newly formed. The town is completely located in the catchment area of the Nainital lake, which has highly folded and faulted rocks due to polyphase deformation.

Landslides are a frequent occurrence in the hill slopes surrounding the lake, which are steep. The slopes are highly vulnerable to landslides and mass movement due to various geological and human factors. The first known landslip occurred in Nainital in 1866 on Alma hill, and in 1879 there was a larger one at the same spot. The greatest landslide in Nainital occurred on 18 September 1880, on the slope which rising from the north of the flats ends at Alma peak, and resulted in 151 people being buried under the debris. Another heavy landslip occurred on 17 August 1898 outside the Nainital valley.

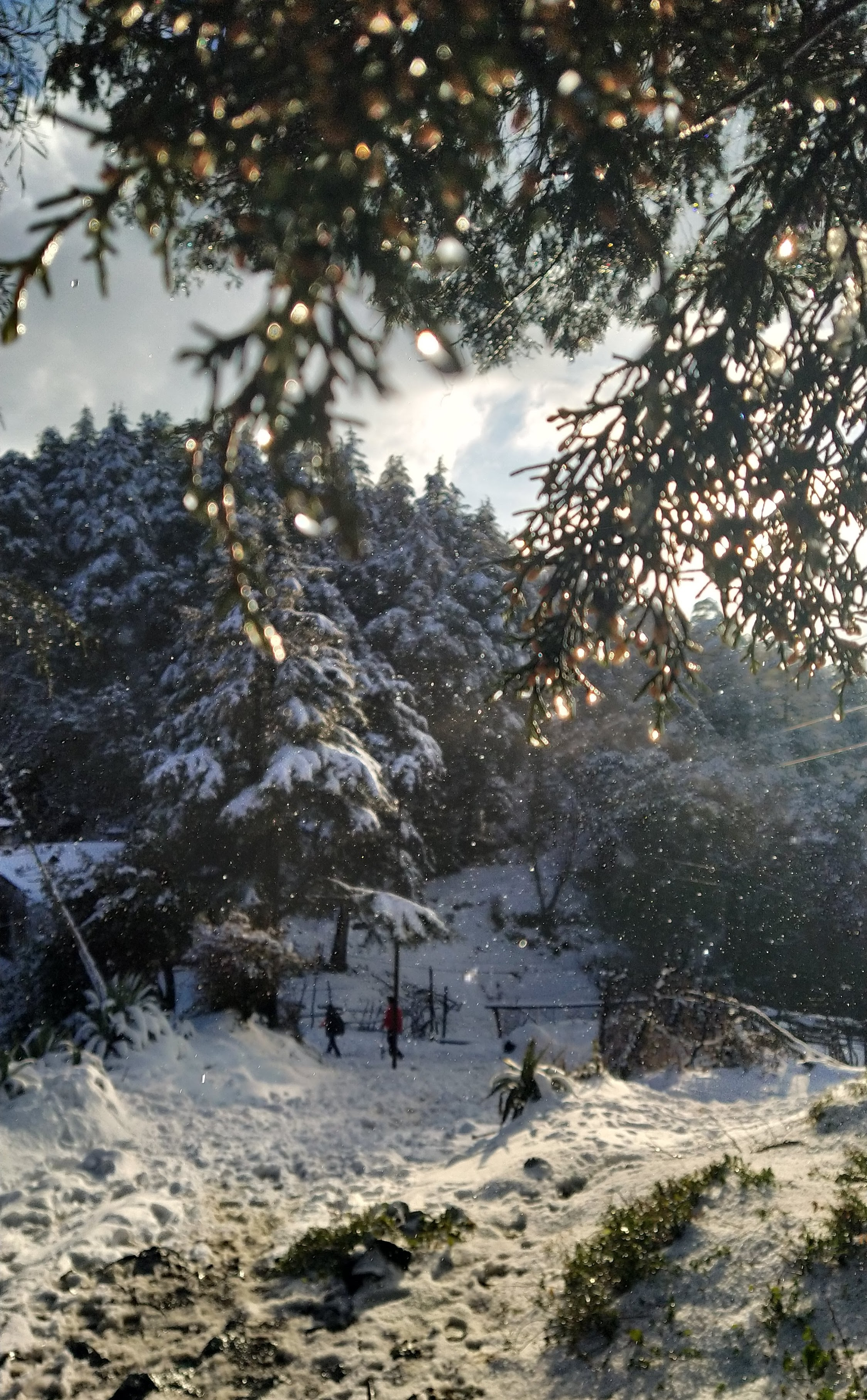
Forest in Nainital after snowfall (2020)

=== Climate ===
Nainital experiences a subtropical highland climate (Cwb) according to Köppen–Geiger climate classification system as the town's climate is influenced by the elevation. The town is a bit dry during winter and very wet during summer due to South Asian monsoon system. The lowest precipitation total occurs in November with total 7.9 millimetres (0.31 in), while the highest precipitation total occurs in July with total 725 millimetres (28.5 in). Like most places in temperate region, Nainital has a relatively cool summer. The hottest month is July with temperature ranging from 16.4 °C (61.5 °F) to 23.5 °C (74.3 °F), while the coldest month is January with temperature ranging from 1.7 °C (35.1 °F) to 10.7 °C (51.3 °F). The highest temperature ever recorded in Nainital was 30 °C (86 °F) recorded on 18 June 1972, while the lowest temperature was −5.6 °C (21.9 °F) recorded on 17 January 1953.

The winter season in Nainital commences by mid-November and lasts till mid-March. The temperature gradually declines from the month of November onwards and January is the coldest month. Frost and mist are common features in the months of December and January. Occasionally widespread rainfall also occurs due to western disturbance, with snow occurring on peaks higher than 2000m. The winter rainfall is sometimes associated with cyclonic activities. The temperature, however, shows an increasing trend by the end of February or the first half of March. By mid-March, there is a progressive rise in temperature, which indicates the onset of the summer season. While days get slightly warmer; the nights continue to be cool. There is a constant increase in temperature during May and early June when the highest temperature is recorded. The months of March and April are also associated with the occurrence of hailstorms, which brings a short spell of cold.

The onset of the summer in the hills is relatively earlier than the plains and is also very lengthy and humid. The mean temperature in July and August goes down and humidity rises abruptly during this season. The monsoon usually begins by mid-May when the rain strikes and continue until mid-October. Nainital, due to its proximity to the outermost high ranges of the Himalaya, receives high annual rainfall. Generally, by mid-September, the monsoon gets weakened and rain occurs generally after long intervals. With the retreat of the monsoon, the winds blow in a reverse direction. The weather during the post-monsoon months is characterised by bright skies. It is in fact a transition between the rains and the winters and with reduced rainfall, the monthly temperature records a progressive decline till mid-January.

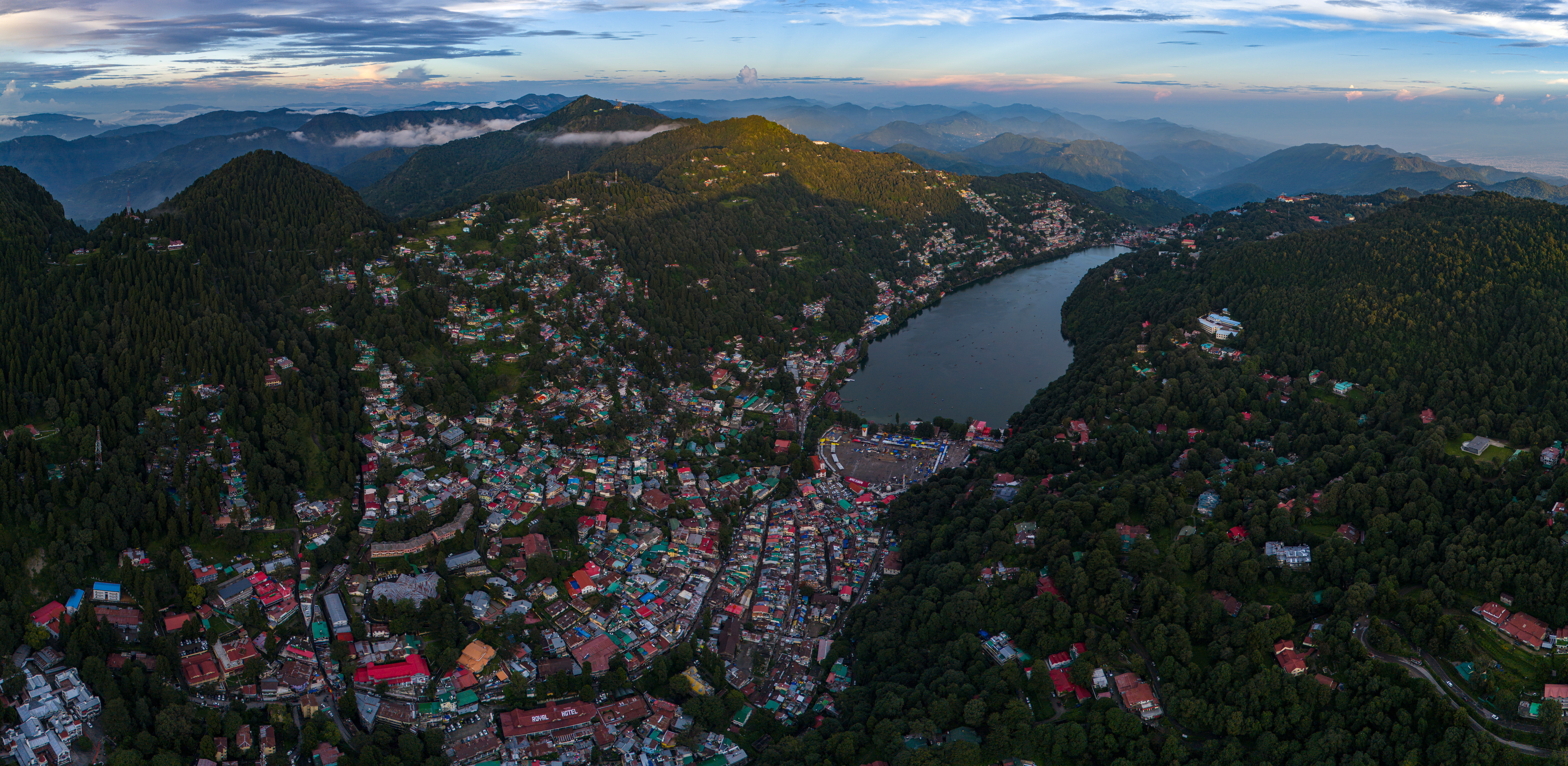
Panoramic view of Nainital town and its lake

Climate data for Nainital (1961–1979, extremes 1953–1979)
Month	Jan	Feb	Mar	Apr	May	Jun	Jul	Aug	Sep	Oct	Nov	Dec	Year
Record high °C (°F)	18.4 (65.1)	21.7 (71.1)	24.6 (76.3)	28.0 (82.4)	29.6 (85.3)	30.0 (86.0)	26.1 (79.0)	26.6 (79.9)	24.6 (76.3)	24.8 (76.6)	21.4 (70.5)	21.8 (71.2)	30.0 (86.0)
Mean daily maximum °C (°F)	10.9 (51.6)	11.9 (53.4)	16.1 (61.0)	20.7 (69.3)	23.2 (73.8)	23.4 (74.1)	21.7 (71.1)	21.0 (69.8)	20.5 (68.9)	18.8 (65.8)	15.3 (59.5)	12.8 (55.0)	18.0 (64.4)
Daily mean °C (°F)	6.3 (43.3)	7.6 (45.7)	11.7 (53.1)	16.2 (61.2)	18.7 (65.7)	19.8 (67.6)	19.0 (66.2)	18.5 (65.3)	17.1 (62.8)	14.2 (57.6)	10.5 (50.9)	7.8 (46.0)	14.0 (57.1)
Mean daily minimum °C (°F)	1.7 (35.1)	3.3 (37.9)	7.3 (45.1)	11.8 (53.2)	14.3 (57.7)	16.2 (61.2)	16.3 (61.3)	16.0 (60.8)	13.7 (56.7)	9.7 (49.5)	5.8 (42.4)	2.9 (37.2)	9.9 (49.8)
Record low °C (°F)	−5.6 (21.9)	−4.3 (24.3)	−3.0 (26.6)	0.0 (32.0)	5.0 (41.0)	10.0 (50.0)	10.4 (50.7)	9.6 (49.3)	4.4 (39.9)	0.5 (32.9)	−1.1 (30.0)	−4.4 (24.1)	−5.6 (21.9)
Average rainfall mm (inches)	82.4 (3.24)	66.1 (2.60)	57.1 (2.25)	33.8 (1.33)	72.4 (2.85)	339.1 (13.35)	685.4 (26.98)	556.4 (21.91)	346.3 (13.63)	54.7 (2.15)	7.7 (0.30)	23.9 (0.94)	2,305.3 (90.76)
Average rainy days	3.5	3.9	3.5	2.8	4.7	12.8	20.4	19.8	11.1	2.8	0.5	1.4	87.2
Average relative humidity (%) (at 17:30 IST)	65	60	53	49	48	66	82	84	79	65	62	59	64
Source: India Meteorological Department

=== Flora and fauna ===
The areas around Nainital (in the middle Himalayan ranges up to 2,000 m (6,600 ft), a temperate zone), is rich in flora (typical temperate climate plants) and fauna. The trees and bushes grown in the region (lake's basin) with their botanical and common Indian names (in parentheses) are: Quercus leucotrichophora Oak (Banj), Aesculus indica (Pangar or Horse chestnuts), Juglans regia (Akhrot or walnut), Populus ciliata (Hill Pipal, a sacred tree), Fraxinus micrantha (Ash tree or Angu), Platanus orientalis (Chinar), Rubus lasiocarpus (Hisalu), Rosa moschata (Kunj or Musk rose), Berberis asiatica (Kilmora), Cupressus torulosa (Surai or Himalayan cypress), Rhododendron arboreum (Buruns), Cedrus deodara (Deodar), Salix acmophylla (Weeping Willow), and Pinus (Pine).

Several species of medicinal flora and horticulture plants have also been found in the lake. The Aquatic Macrophytic vegetation include Potamogeton pectinatus, Potamogeton crispus, Polygonum glabrum, Polygonum amphibium and Polygonum hydropiper (Water pepper). The fishes found in the lake are generally carps Mahseer, and the mirror carp which breed several times during one spawning season during May to September. Two species of Mahaseer fish viz., Tor tor: The red finned mahseer and the Tor putitora: The yellow finned mahseer, a food fish which grows to varying sizes from 20 to 60 cm (7.87 to 23.62 inches) are found. Three species of Hill Trout are found in the lake: the Schizothorax sinuatus, Schizothorax richardsoni and Schizothorax plagiostornus. The imported fish bred in the lake is Mirror carp or Cyprinus carpio. Gambusia affinis also called Mosquitofish has been introduced in the lake as a biocontrol measure to control Mosquito larvae.

== Demographics ==
Historical population
Year	Pop.	±%
1881	6,576	—
1891	8,455	+28.6%
1901	7,609	−10.0%
1911	10,270	+35.0%
1921	11,230	+9.3%
1931	9,741	−13.3%
1941	9,539	−2.1%
1951	12,350	+29.5%
1961	14,495	+17.4%
1971	23,986	+65.5%
1981	24,835	+3.5%
1991	29,837	+20.1%
2001	38,630	+29.5%
2011	41,377	+7.1%
Source: 1881: The Imperial Gazetteer of India; 1901–2011: District Census Handbook: Nainital

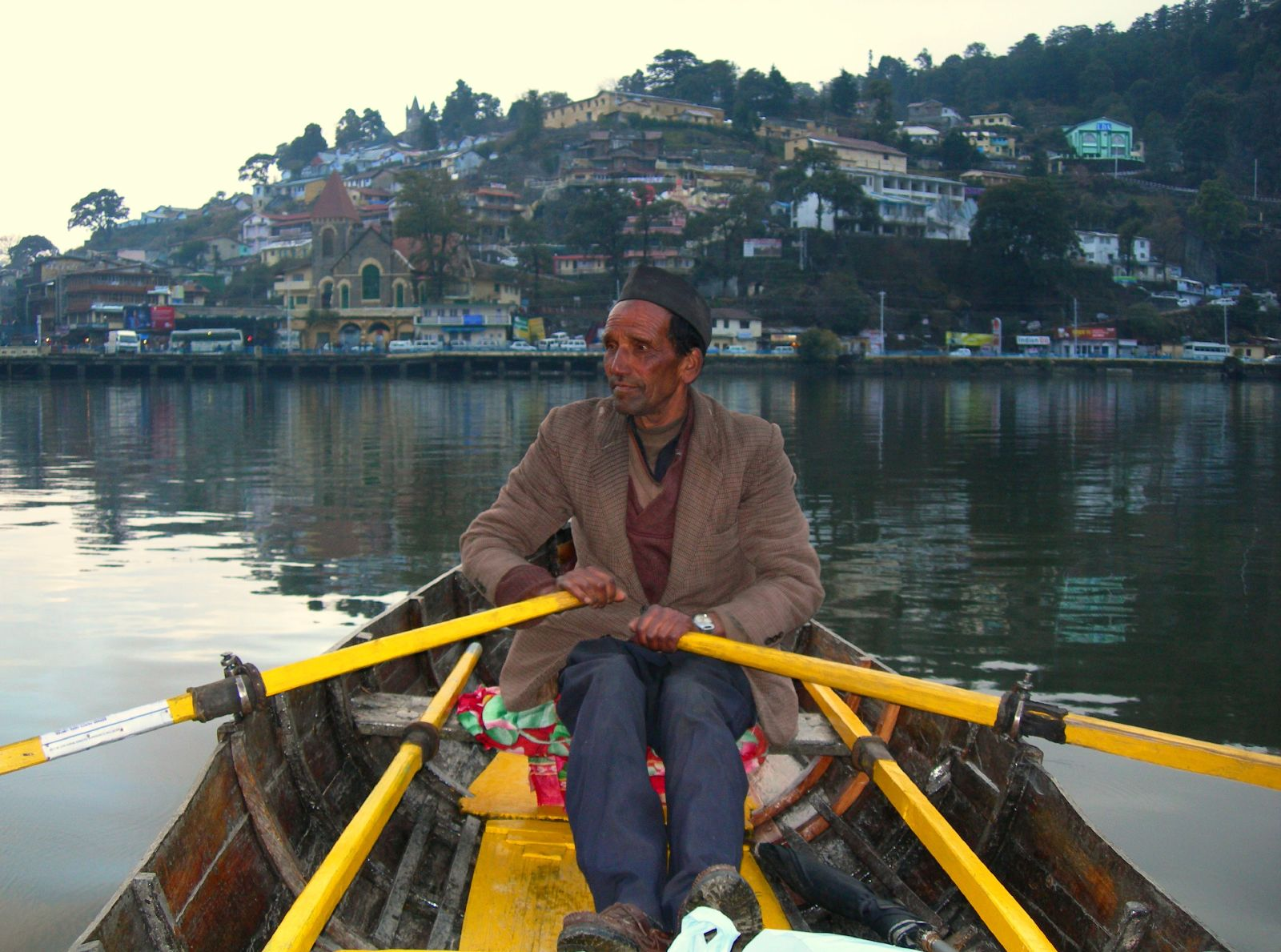
A native boatman on the Naini Lake.

As of the 2011 Indian census, Nainital had a population of 41,377. Males constitute 52.3% of the population and females 47.7%, which gives the town a sex ratio of 911 women per every 1000 men, which is less than the Uttarakhand state average of 963 women per every 1000 men. The population density was 3527.45 people per square km. There were 9,329 housing units in the town at an average density of 795.31 households per square km. 9.54% of the population is under 6 years of age. In 2011, Nainital had an average literacy rate of 92.93%, higher than the Uttarakhand state average of 78.82% - around 96.09% males and 89.47% females in the town are literate.

A special Census taken in September 1880, at the height of the tourism season, returned a total population of 10,054 for the town. However, the official Census in February 1881 returned the population, then at its lowest, at 6,576. The population slightly rose in the following decade, rising to 8,455 in 1891. After dropping to 7,609 in 1901, it remained steady in the coming two decades; 10,270 in 1911 and 11,230 in 1921. The population took another drop, when the 1931 and 1941 censuses returned a population of 9,741 and 9,539 respectively, but has seen a continuous rise since then, with subsequent census reports returning a population of 12350 in 1951, 14495 in 1961, 23986 in 1971, 24835 in 1981, 29837 in 1991, 38630 in 2001, and 41377 in 2011.

Religions in Nainital Town (2011)
Religion	Percent
Hindus	85.61%
Muslims	11.91%
Sikh	0.75%
Christian	0.92%
Others†	0.8%

Hinduism is the largest religion in Nainital, with 85.61% of residents identifying as Hindus in the 2011 Census. The town's religious profile is highly diverse, Nainital has a significant number of people from Muslim, Sikh and Christian communities. Islam is second most popular religion in town of Nainital with approximately 11.91% following it. Christianity is followed by 0.92%, Jainism by 0.01%, Sikhism by 0.75% and Buddhism by 0.77%. Approximately 0.02% of the population were either atheists or followed 'no particular religion'. Nainital in 1880 had a population of 10,054, which consisted of 6,862 Hindus, 1,748 Muslims, 1,348 Europeans, 34 Eurasians, 57 Native Christians and 5 'others'. Kumaonis form the major part of the town's population along with people from all over India. A person from Nainital is called Naintālwāl in Kumaoni. Wāl is the Kumaoni term for resident.

=== Languages ===
Hindi is the official language, while Sanskrit is the additional official language of the town. Kumaoni is the native language and is the most spoken language in the town. Hindi and English also serve as lingua franca between locals and tourists/outsiders.

== Government and politics ==
=== Civic Administration ===
The municipal board of Nainital had its origin in 1845, when the provisions of the Act I of 1842 were sanctioned by the government in the town, which then applied to approximately two thirds of the total population. It was the second Municipal Board of North Western Provinces.

=== Politics ===
Nainital town is represented in the Lok Sabha, the lower house of the Indian Parliament, by a representative elected from the Nainital-Udhamsingh Nagar Constituency. Ajay Bhatt (politician), from BJP, is the current Member of Parliament from Nainital-Udhamsingh Nagar. He won the 2024 Indian general elections by 3,31,481 votes against Prakash Joshi from the Congress. Prior to the delimitation of the Loksabha Constituencies of Uttarakhand in 2008, the town was a part of the Nainital Lok Sabha constituency. Sarita Arya of the BJP is the current MLA from Nainital Assembly constituency.

== Notable sites ==
=== Nainital Zoo ===
The Nainital Zoo is located on Tallital, Sher Ka Danda Hill at height of 2,100m or 6900 ft above sea level. The zoo was officially named as G. B. Pant High Altitude Zoo.

=== Jama Masjid ===
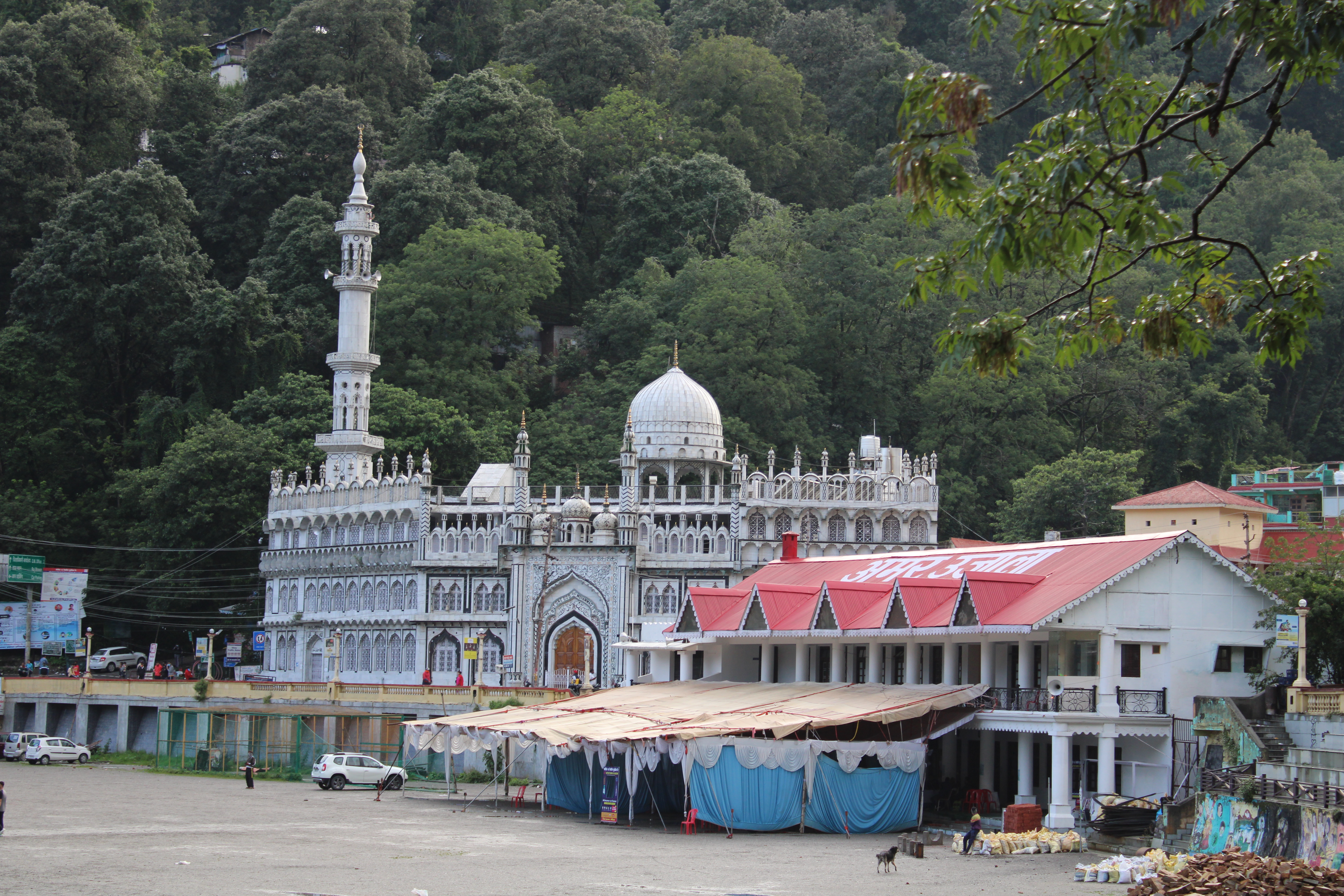
Jama Masjid Mosque, Nainital

The Jama Masjid of Nainital, located in Mallital area of Nainital, is a mosque which was built in 1882 during the British Raj. The most notable feature is the mihrab where a niche shows the direction towards Mecca.

=== Naina Devi Temple ===
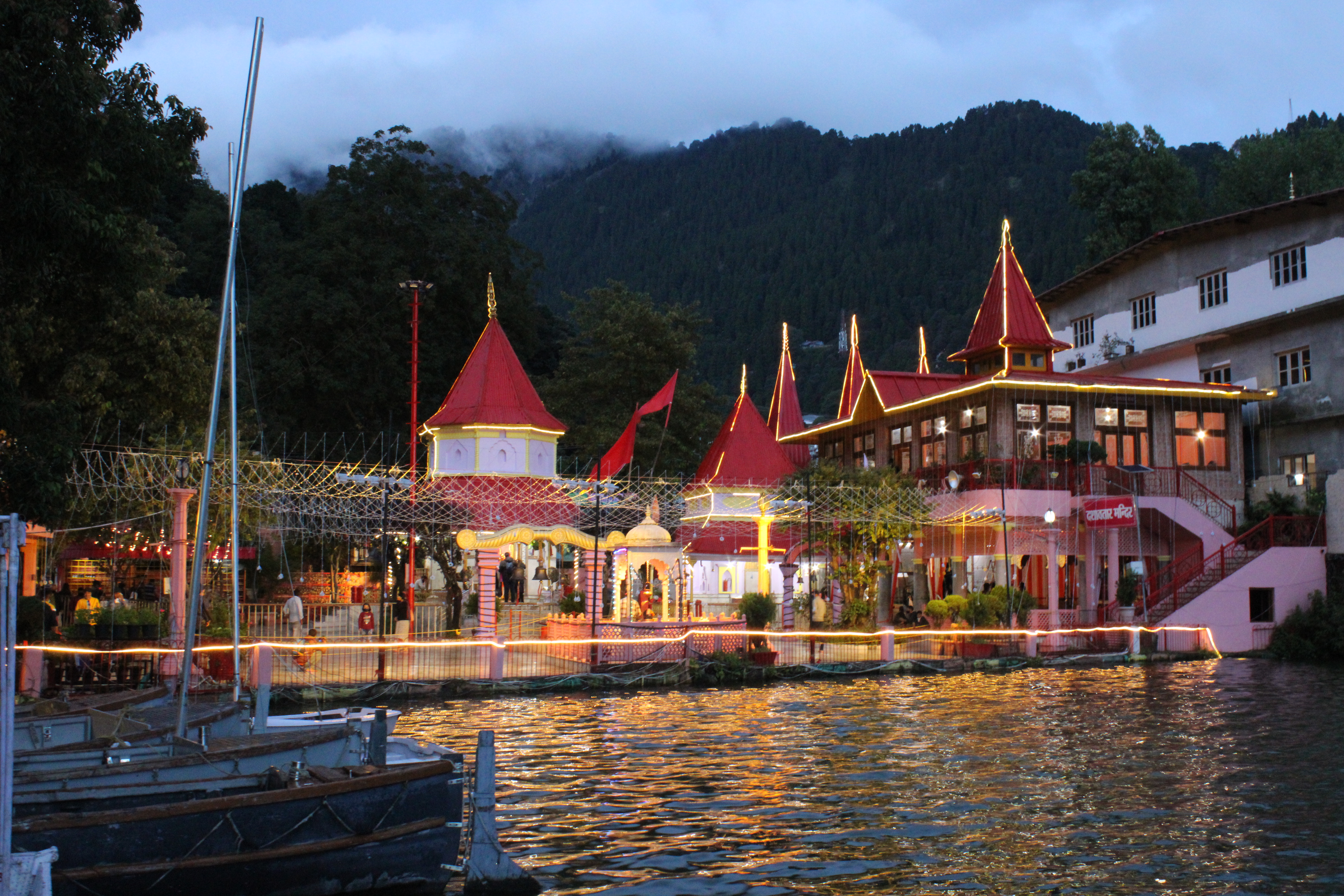
A view of the Maa Naina Devi Temple, Mallital, Nainital, Kumaon, India

The temple of Naina Devi is located at the upper end of Naini lake. This temple is dedicated to the goddess of the town, Naina Devi. Its complex becomes the location of the Nanda Devi Mela festival which held every year on Nandashtami during September.

=== St John Wilderness Church ===
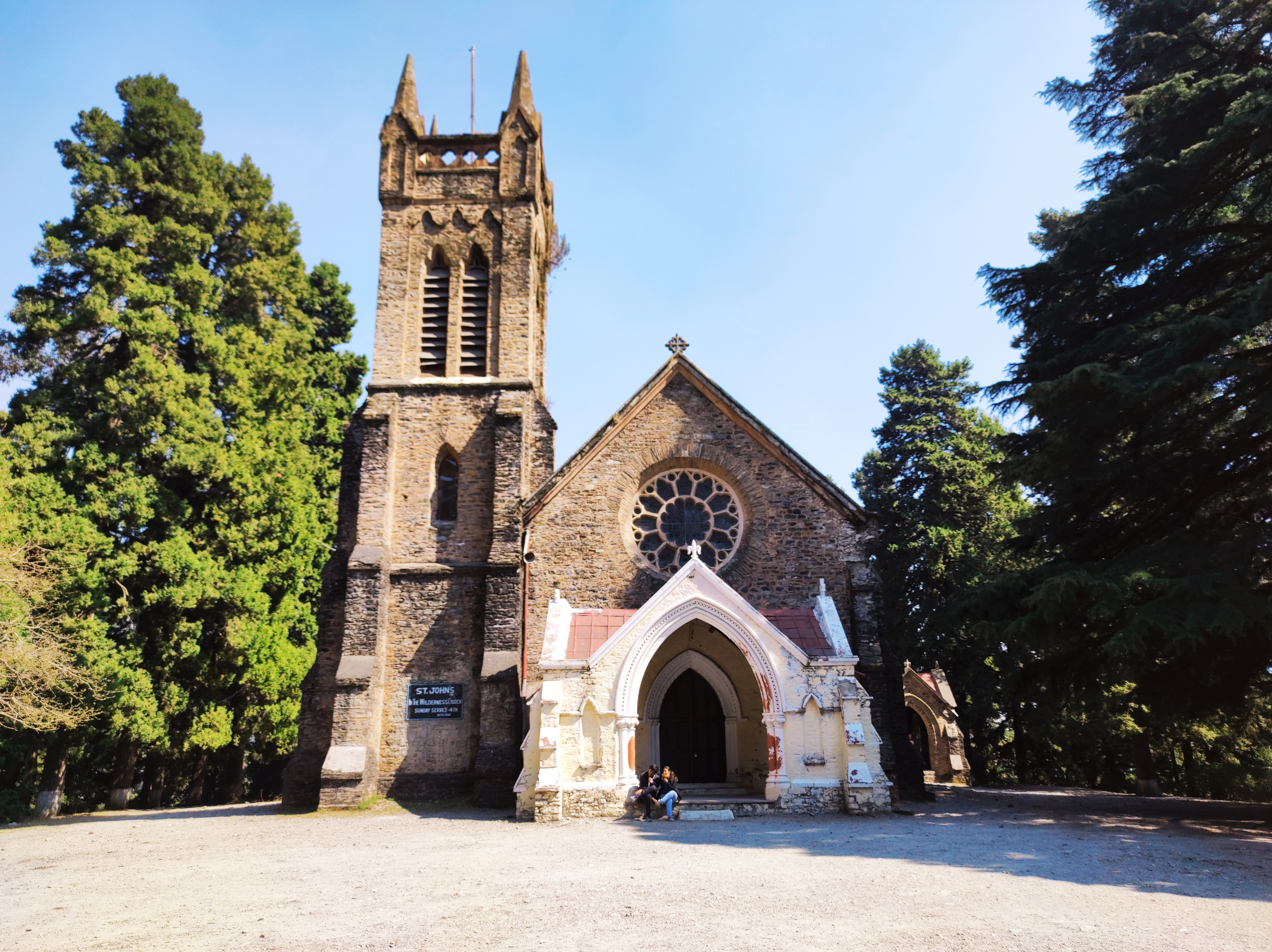
A view of St John in the Wilderness Church, Sukhatal, Mallital, Nainital, Kumaon.

St. John in the Wilderness is one of the oldest and finest churches in Nainital. The church is dedicated to St. John the Baptist. This Anglican Church was built in 1846 and is one of the earliest buildings erected in Nainital.

=== Eco Cave Gardens ===
Eco Cave Gardens is a cluster of naturally formed rocky caves. It is close to the Mall Road. It has 6 caves formed in the shape of animals.

=== Libraries ===
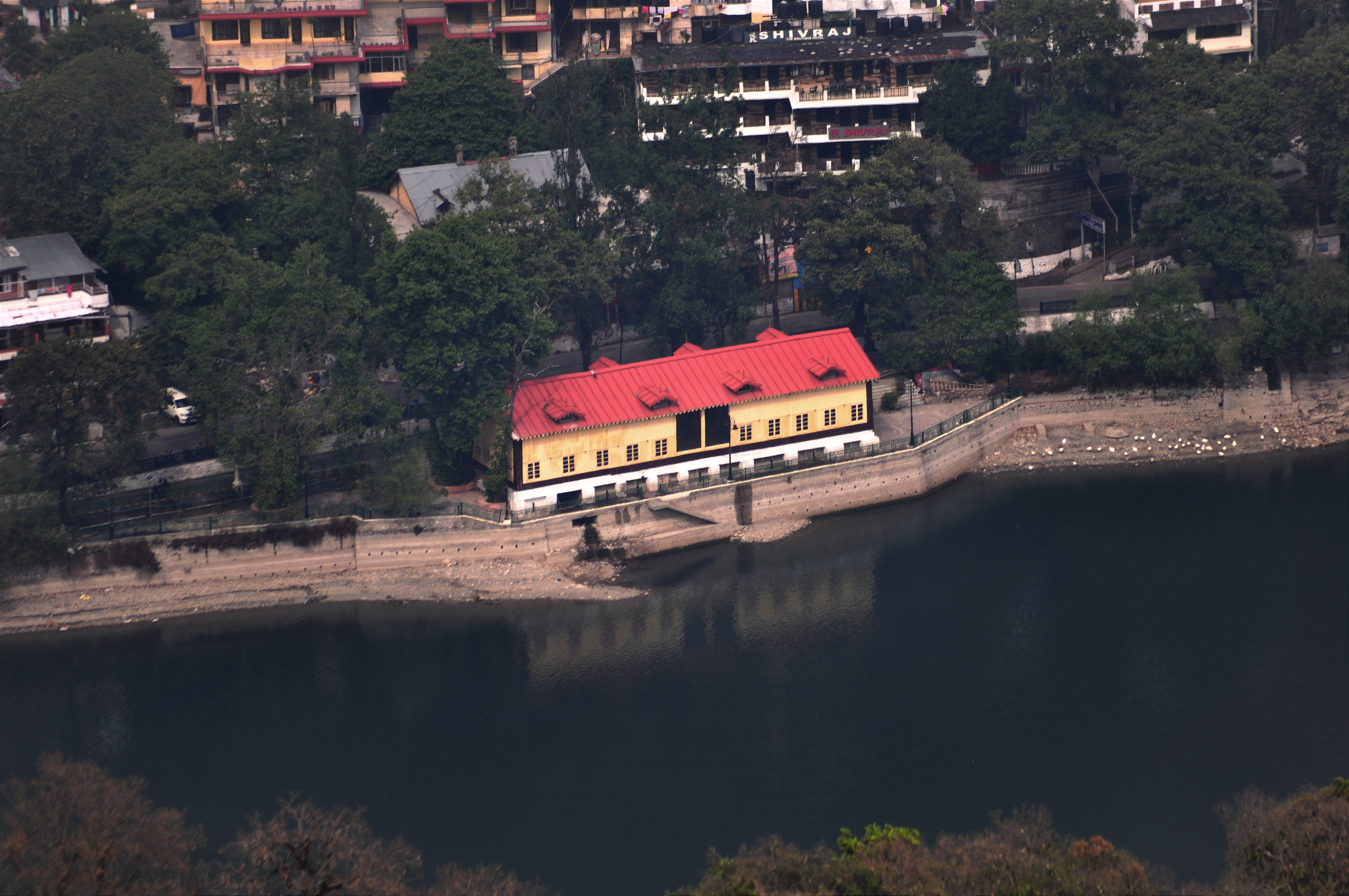
A view of Durga Lal Shah Municipal Public Library, Nainital, Kumaon, India

There are a number of libraries in the Nainital area. Among them are the Durga Lal Shah Municipal Public Library on the Mall, founded in 1934, the Uttarakhand Academy of Administration, Library and Documentation Center, Mallital, the ARIES Observatory Library, and the Kumaon University Library, Nainital.

== Transport ==
=== Roadways ===
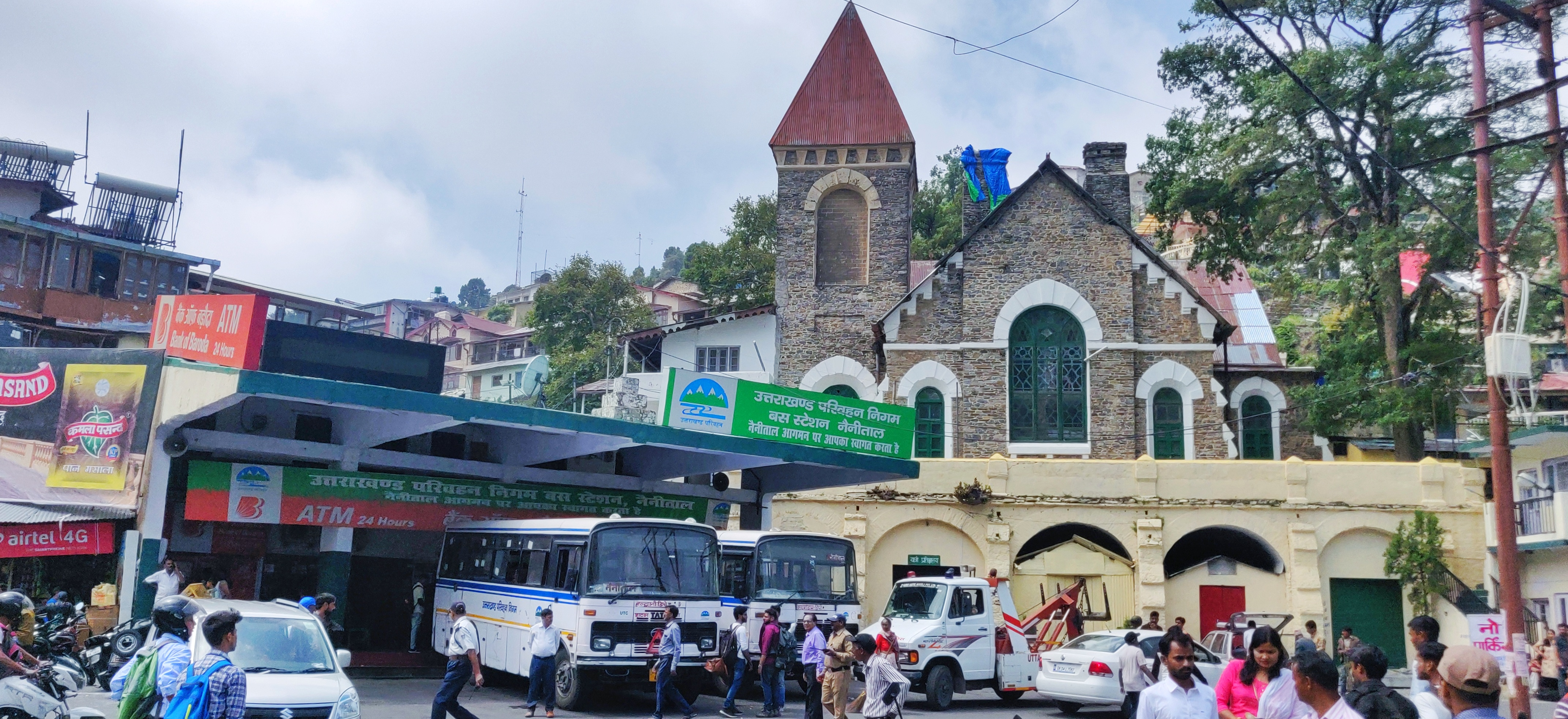
The old roadways bus station is located at Tallital in front of the Naini Lake.

Nainital can be reached by the National Highway 109 (previously National Highway 87) from Haldwani, 40 km (25 mi) away, or by State Highway 13 from Bajpur, 60 km (37 mi) away.

=== Airways ===
The nearest airport is in Pantnagar near Rudrapur, about 71 km (44 mi) from Nainital. Alliance Air, Air Heritage and Deccan Charters are the three carriers, that connect the airport to Delhi, Dehradun and Pithoragarh.

=== Railways ===
The closest major railway station is Kathgodam, on the outskirts of Haldwani, which is connected with almost all major cities of the country.

== Education ==
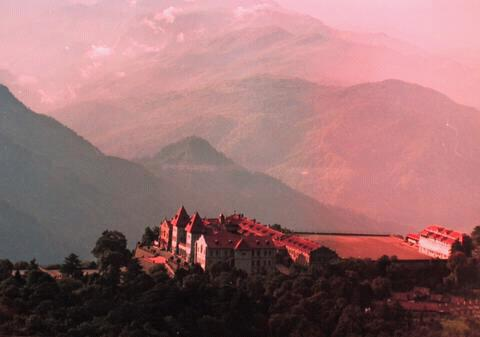
St. Joseph's College, Nainital from Tiffin Top (Dorothy's Seat)

In the latter half of the 19th century a number of "European" schools for boys and girls were founded in Nainital. During the Victorian and Edwardian eras, students in these schools consisted largely of children of the British colonial officials or soldiers. The Diocesan Girls' High School, now known as All Saints' College, was established in 1869, near where the High Court of Uttarakhand stands today. By 1906, there were over half a dozen such schools, including the Diocesan Boys' School (later renamed Sherwood College) and the Philander Smith's college (later renamed Halett War School, currently Birla Vidya Mandir).

St. Joseph's College, Nainital (popularly known as SEM), a day-boarding and residential school built by Irish brothers. In 1888, celebrated its 125th anniversary in 2013. Another important school for girls, St. Mary's Convent High School, Nainital (popularly known as Ramnee), was established in 1878, and celebrated its 125th anniversary in year 2003.

== Notable people ==
- Sukirti Kandpal, TV actress
- Sudhir Kakar, renowned psychoanalyst
- Eric Maturin, British actor
- Rajendra K. Pachauri, chairman of the Intergovernmental Panel on Climate Change
- Manish Pandey, cricketer who plays for Karnataka and Bangalore
- Jim Corbett, Hunter, writer and naturalist
- Nirmal Pandey, Bollywood actor and singer
- Govind Ballabh Pant, statesman and leader of India's independence movement, first Indian Premier of British India, the first Chief Minister of Uttar Pradesh and the third Home Minister of India
- Krishna Chandra Pant, former Deputy Chairman of the Planning Commission of India. Educated at St. Joseph's College.
- Hamida Saiduzzafar, ophthalmologist
- Henry Stephens Salt, considered as the 'father of animal rights'. Born in Nainital.
- Narayan Dutt Tiwari, Indian leader and politician, former Governor of Andhra Pradesh, former Chief Minister of Uttarakhand and Uttar Pradesh, and former Finance Minister of India.
- Orde Charles Wingate, British general and commander of the Chindits in Burma during World War II

== See also ==
- Aryabhatta Research Institute of Observational Sciences
- Nainital Forest Division
