= Stringer (name) =

Origin
- Origin: English, Old English
- Meaning: Maker of strings, bowstrings
- Region of origin: England

Stringer (pronounced to rhyme with "ringer") is an English occupational surname and occasionally used as a given name. It originally denoted a maker of rope or strings, and especially those for the famous English longbows used for both hunting and war. It is based on an agent derivative of the Old English streng, meaning "string," which is in turn based on the Old Norse strengr. In Yorkshire, where it is still particularly common, George Redmonds argues that the surname may have been connected with ironworking, a stringer having operated some form of specialist hearth.

Early examples of the surname recorded in authentic registers and charters of the medieval period include:

Roger le Strenger in 1293, Yorkshire;
Lady Godwyna Strenger in 1328, Somerset;
Richard Stringer, in 1679, a footsoldier of Barbados.

The first recorded spelling of the family name is believed to be that of Walter Stringere, which was dated 1194, in the Curia Regis Rolls for Wiltshire.

== List of people ==
=== Surname ===
- Ahren Stringer, bassist and vocalist in the Australian band The Amity Affliction
- Alex J. Stringer, Canadian politician
- Arlene Stringer-Cuevas (1933–2020), American politician
- C. Vivian Stringer, Rutgers University women's basketball head coach
- Jake Stringer, Australian rules footballer for Essendon
- Chris Stringer, British anthropologist
- Dave Stringer, English former player and manager of the Norwich City football club
- Gary Stringer, member of Reef (band)
- George Stringer, English recipient of the Victoria Cross in World War I
- Jesse Stringer, Australian rules footballer for Geelong
- Jimmy Stringer, English footballer
- Graham Stringer, British Member of Parliament
- Howard Stringer, chief executive officer of Sony Corporation
- John Bentley Stringer, British computer pioneer
- Korey Stringer, National Football League player who died of heat stroke during training camp
- Lee Stringer, American writer and editor
- Lew Stringer, English comic artist and scriptwriter
- Michael Stringer John Michael Stringer (1924–2004), film production designer
- Nick Stringer, English actor
- Peter Stringer, Irish rugby union footballer
- Peter Stringer (cricketer) (born 1943), English cricketer
- Reed Stringer (born 1979), American football coach
- Scott Stringer (born 1960), American politician, 2021 mayoral candidate for New York City
- Scott Stringer (American football) (born 1951), American football player
- Tippy Stringer (1930-2010), American television personality
- Vickie Stringer, American novelist
- Walter Stringer Sir Thomas Walter Stringer (1855–1944), New Zealand judge
- Warren Stringer, Canadian politician

=== Given name ===
- Stringer Davis (1896–1973), English actor
- Stringer Lawrence (1697–1775), English soldier of the East India Company

== Fictional characters ==
- Marty Stringer, played by John Michael Higgins in Evan Almighty
- Mr. Stringer, the part that Davis played alongside his wife Margaret Rutherford in four Miss Marple films
- Stringer Bell, a fictional character on The Wire, whose name is a composite of two real Baltimore criminals', Stringer Reed and Roland Bell
- Mr. R. J. Stringer III, played by Rowan Atkinson in The Witches (1990 film) and by Stanley Tucci in The Witches (2020 film)

== See also ==
- Stringer (disambiguation)
- Strenger
