= John Stringer =

John Stringer or Johnny Stringer may refer to:

- John Bentley Stringer (1928–1979), British computer pioneer
- John Stringer (composer), British composer, oboist, conductor and academic
- Johnny Stringer (born 1950), American politician
- Johnny Stringer (RAF officer) (born 1969), British senior air force officer
