= Joon-hee =

- Hangul: 준희
- RR: Junhui
- MR: Chunhŭi

Joon-hee, also spelled Jun-hee, is a Korean given name.

People with this name include:

- Lim Jun-hee (born 1959), South Korean composer and professor
- Jun Choi (born Jun-Hee Choi, 1971), American entrepreneur and politician
- Joseph Kahn (director) (born Ahn Jun-hee, 1972), South Korean-born American director
- Han Jun-hee (born 1985), South Korean director and screenwriter
- Go Joon-hee (born Kim Eun-ju, 1986), South Korean actress
- Lee Joon-hee (born 1988), South Korean football player
- Juniel (born Choi Jun-hee, 1993), South Korean singer-songwriter
- Jun Hee Lee, American actor

Fictional characters with this name include:

- Go Joon-hee, in 2005 South Korean television series Fashion 70's
- Go Joon-hee, in 2006 South Korean television series What's Up Fox
- Lee Joon-hee, in 2009 South Korean television series Cinderella Man
- Gu Jun-hee, in 2009 South Korean television series Boys Over Flowers
- Kang Joon-hee, in 2012 South Korean television series Reply 1997
- Kim Jun-hee, in 2024 South Korean television series Squid Game season 2

== See also ==
- List of Korean given names
