= Jae-joon =

- Hangul: 재준
- RR: Jaejun
- MR: Chaejun

Jae-joon, also spelled Jae-jun, is a Korean given name.

People with this name include:

- Nam Jae-joon (born 1944), South Korean intelligence officer; see list of directors of the National Intelligence Service (South Korea) and predecessor organizations
- Jaejun Yu (born 1962), South Korean physicist
- Jeajoon Ryu (born 1970), South Korean composer
- An Jae-jun (footballer, born 1986) (born 1986), South Korean footballer
- Kim Jae-joong (born Han Jae-joon, 1986), South Korean singer
- Lee Jae-joon (born 1990), South Korean actor and model
- Lee Jae-joon (born 1997), stage name Maru, member of South Korean boyband C-Clown

Fictional characters with this name include:

- Lee Jae-joon, in 2009 South Korean film My Girlfriend Is an Agent
- Shin Jae-joon, in 2009 South Korean film Heaven's Postman
- Jae-joon, in 2012 South Korean film The Grand Heist
- Kim Jae-joon, in 2013 South Korean television series Good Doctor
- Han Jae-joon, in 2014 South Korean television series Doctor Stranger
- Jeon Jae-jun, in 2022 South Korean television series The Glory

== See also ==
- List of Korean given names
