= Sungji Hong =

South Korean composer

Sungji Hong (Korean: 홍성지) (b. 1973) is a South Korean composer of contemporary music, based in the United States. Her work Missa Lumen de Lumine, a setting of the Roman-rite Catholic Mass ordinary for three voices, was written for Trio Mediæval in 2002. The trio recorded it in 2005. In a review for The Gramophone, Ivan Moody found it "rather a fragmentary affair", though with "some dazzling moments".

== Biography ==
Sungji Hong received a 2022 Guggenheim Fellowship, a 2022 Charles Ives Fellowship from the American Academy of Arts and Letters, and a 2024 Civitella Ranieri Foundation Fellowship. She has received commissions from the Chicago Center for Contemporary Composition at the University of Chicago, the Fromm Music Foundation at Harvard University, the National Flute Association, the Texas Flute Society, the MATA Festival, the Tongyeong International Music Festival, the Kumho Asiana Cultural Foundation, the Seoul Philharmonic Orchestra, and Ensemble TIMF. She was the Manson Fellow of Composition at the Royal Academy and was made an Associate of the Royal Academy of Music (ARAM) in London.

She pursued her Ph.D. in composition at the University of York under the supervision of Nicola LeFanu, supported by the Vinson Award and the Chevening Scholarship.

Hong is currently an Associate Professor of Music Composition at the University of North Texas.

== Education ==
- University of York, PhD in Music Composition (2000–2004) Studied with Nicola LeFanu, John Stringer, and Thomas Simaku
- Royal Academy of Music, MMus in Composition (1998–2000) Studied with Paul Patterson and Robert Saxton
- Hanyang University, BMus in Composition (1993–1997) Studied with Kyungsun Suh

== Works ==
=== Concerto ===
- 2008: Prismatic for piano and chamber orchestra
- 2023: Igerthi for piano and sinfonietta
- 2024: Silence for oboe and orchestra

=== Chamber ===
- 2018: Elevatus for flute, clarinet, trombone, percussion, piano, violin and violoncello
- 2023: Flamingly for 13 players

=== Ensemble ===
- 2006: Shades of Raindrops for flute, bass clarinet, violin, violoncello and piano
- 2008: Luminous Flux for flute, oboe, clarinet, piano, violin, and violoncello
- 2009: Resting in Light for clarinet, violin, viola, and violoncello
- 2011: Bisbiglio for flute, clarinet, and piano
- 2015: Et descendit for flute, viola and harp
- 2015: Evlogimenos for clarinet, violin, violoncello and piano
- 2016: Lazare veni foras! for piccolo, clarinet/bass clarinet, trombone, piano, violin & double bass
- 2017: Lucem Vitae for clarinet, violin, violoncello and piano
- 2018: Lux Mundi for oboe, violin, violoncello and piano
- 2022: Estavrosan for flute, bass clarinet, violin, violoncello and piano
- 2023: Eplisthisan for flute, clarinet, violin, violoncello and piano

=== Solo & Duo ===
- 2008: Flash for violin
- 2016: Fruscio for piccolo
- 2019: Agonia for flute and piano
- 2019: Exevalen for bass clarinet
- 2020: Vidimus stellam for flute
- 2020: Hxó for flute
- 2021: Proba me, Deus for violin
- 2023: Silver Bells! for piano
- 2023: Ruach for contrabass flute
- 2023: Fatni for alto flute

=== Choral ===
- 2002: Missa Lumen de Lumine for three female voices (SSA)
- 2004: Emendemus in melius for mixed voices (SATB)
- 2004: Pater Noster for mixed voices (SATB)
- 2007: The Lord is my Shepherd for mixed voices (SATB)
- 2013: Ficus enim non florebit for four female voices (SSAA)
- 2015: O nata lux for three female voices (SSA)
- 2016: Postea scien Jesus for mixed voices (SATB) and organ
- 2019: O sacrum convivium for mixed voices (SATB)
- 2022: Lux Aeterna for girls’ choir (SSA)
- 2024: Missa Ichthys for three female voices (SSA)

=== Electronics ===
- 2005: Black Arrow for bass clarinet and fixed media
- 2015: Shine for flute and fixed media
- 2021: Ekvallein for bass clarinet and fixed media
- 2021: Exepnefsen for oboe and electronics
