= Literary references to Nainital =

References to the Indian town

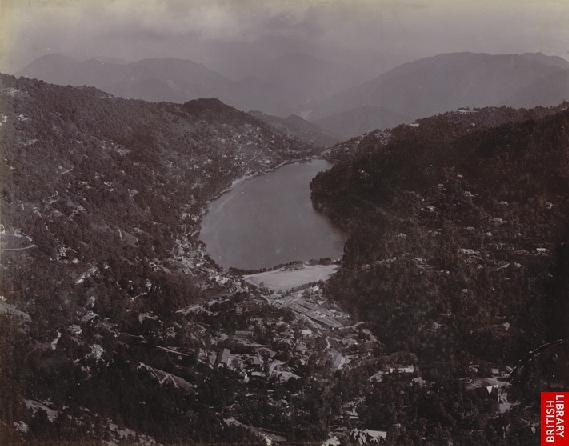
"General view looking down on Naini Tal Lake from the northern hills," Photograph of Nainital from the Macnabb Collection (Col James Henry Erskine Reid): Album of views of 'Naini Tal' taken by Lawrie & Company in 1895. Oriental and India Office Collection, British Library.

The town of Nainital (in British times Naini Tal or Nynee Tal), India was founded in 1841 by P. Barron, a sugar trader from Shahjahanpur. By 1846 the church St John's in the Wilderness was founded and a hill station had begun to flourish. Among the authors who referred to Nainital in their writings were Rudyard Kipling, Premchand, and Jim Corbett. This page consists of references to Nainital in literature (in the public domain).

== Josiah Bateman ==
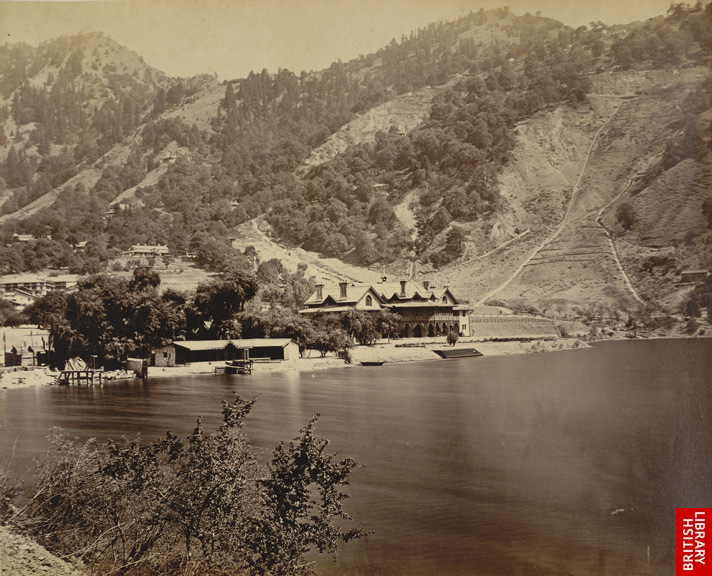
"Naini Tal, After landslip of 1880." 1883. Macnabb Coll. O&IOC, British Library. Click to enlarge.

1860. From (the public domain), The Life of The Right Rev. Daniel Wilson, D.D., Late Lord Bishop of Calcutta and Metropolitan of India, Volume II, John Murray, Albemarle Street, London, 1860. Chapter XVII (First Metropolitan Visitation): "Onwards through Futtehgur and Bareilly he passed to a new mountain station, called Nynee-Thal. Concerning it, he writes":

'Nynee-Thal, 6,200 feet (1,900 m) above the level of the sea.' '23 February 1844.' 'We came up here yesterday, fourteen miles (21 km), by one of those strange, winding, precipitous roads, common to all mountainous countries. The air is keen and penetrating. The spot is one of those beautiful scenes with which the Himalayahs abound. Its peculiarity is an enclosure of rocks, two thousand feet above the spot itself, and covered with hanging woods, protecting, as it were, with their giant forms the peaceful lake, or "Thal," below. Around this lake the gentry are beginning to erect their houses, as at Simlah and Mussooree. The whole is like the "Happy Valley" of Rasselas. We halt here, on our way to Almorah, longer than we should otherwise do, because of the movement of troops. A site for a church (Note: to be later named St. John in the Wilderness) has been chosen; and to lay the foundation is my special business here. Beasts of prey, tigers, leopards, &c., abound so fearfully, that there is no stirring out without guides, armed with guns and spears'

"The visit to this spot was, however, evidently premature. The season was far too early. Not a single European was in residence. The Bishop was compelled to take shelter in a miserable, half-finished, and totally unfurnished house. He caught a bad cold, and was taken very ill; and after moving to Almorah, kept his bed for some days. It was not till 8 March that he was able to consecrate the little church at Almorah, designed on his former visit."

== Hannah S. Battersby ==
1887. Hannah S. Battersby. From the book: Home Lyrics, Toronto : Hunter, Rose & Co. (In the public domain. Available on Project Gutenberg .)

The Naini Tal Catastrophe of 18th September 1880
... And though the sky hung like a sable pall
Over the fair oasis, nestling calm
Beneath the trusted shelter of the hills,
And o'er the broad lake-outlet of the floods,
What cause had they to fear? 'Twas often thus,
And the long wished-for rains would bring forth joy
So reasoned they who, peaceful, viewed unmoved
Th' outpouring of that sullen ocean cloud,
When suddenly, they who had calmly felt
So safe one little span of time before,
Discovered in dismay the swollen floods
Meant danger—that the safety of their homes.
Was menaced, walls were tottering, waters rose, ...

For scarcely had they timely refuge found,
Than a huge limb of the great mountain fell,
Sweeping the fair hill-side of house and land,
And burying dozens of their fellow men
In one uncompromising, living tomb! ...

Strong men in the proud glory of life's prime,
Women in joyful trustfulness of love
With little children in full bloom of life;
All in the twinkling of an eye cut down,
In that rude harvest of the tyrant Death! ...

Now the late lovely valley, Naini Tal
Stands as a witness of the frailty
Of human strength 'gainst the o'erwhelming might ...

== Kipling ==
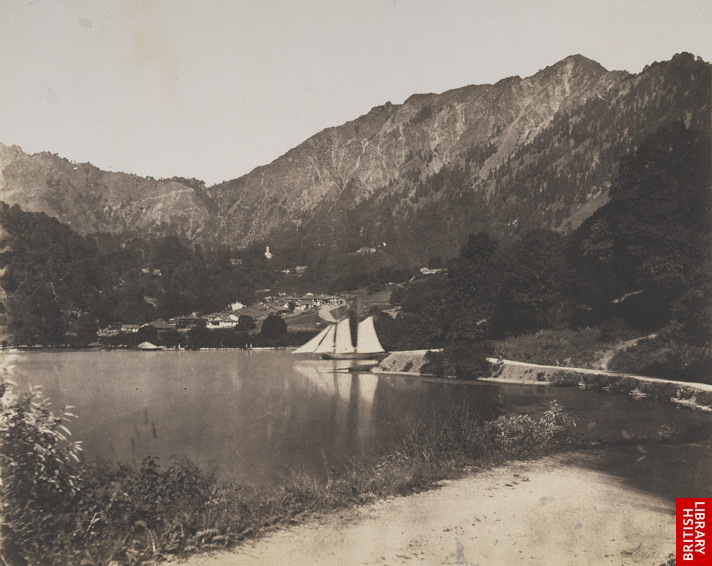
(Naina (Cheena or China) Peak can be seen on the right in this 1855 photograph, and Deopatta sloping upwards on the left. "View [of Naini Tal] from the Lake." 1855. Photographer Dr. John Murray (1809–1898). From Murray Collection: 'Photographic views in Agra and its vicinity.' Oriental and India Office Collection, British Library. Click to enlarge.

1889. Rudyard Kipling Story of the Gadsbys. From chapter, The World Without.

"CURTISS. There's something in that. It was slightly noticeable now you come to mention it. But she's at Naini Tal and he's at Simla. ANTHONY. He had to go to Simla to look after a globe-trotter relative of his—a person with a title. Uncle or aunt. BLAYNE. And there he got engaged. No law prevents a man growing tired of a woman. ANTHONY. Except that he mustn’t do it till the woman is tired of him. And the Herriott woman was not that. CURTISS. She may be now. Two months of Naini Tal works wonders."

From chapter, Tents of Kedar,

SCENE—A Naini Tal dinner for thirty-four. Plate, wines, crockery, and khitmatgars care fully calculated to scale of Rs. 6000 per mensem, less Exchange. Table split lengthways by bank of flowers. MRS. HERRIOTT. (After conversation has risen to proper pitch.) Ah! Didn't see you in the crush in the drawing-room. (Sotto voce.) Where have you been all this while, Pip?" .... "PARTNER ON LEFT. Very close tonight, isn't it? You find it too much for you? MRS. H. Oh, no, not in the least. But they really ought to have punkahs, even in your cool Naini Tal, oughtn’t they? (Turns, dropping fan and raising eyebrows.) CAPT. G. It's all right. (Aside.) Here comes the storm!"

1895. Rudyard Kipling, Only a Subaltern in Under the Deodars From the short story:

Bobby pressed his forehead against the rain-splashed window-pane as the train lumbered across the sodden Doab, and prayed for the health of the Tyneside Tail Twisters. Naini Tal had sent down her contingent with all speed; the lathering ponies of the Dalhousie Road staggered into Pathankot, taxed to the full stretch of their strength; while from cloudy Darjiling the Calcutta Mail whirled up the last straggler of the little army that was to fight a fight, in which was neither medal nor honour for the winning, against an enemy none other than "the sickness that destroyeth in the noonday."

== Joseph Fayrer ==
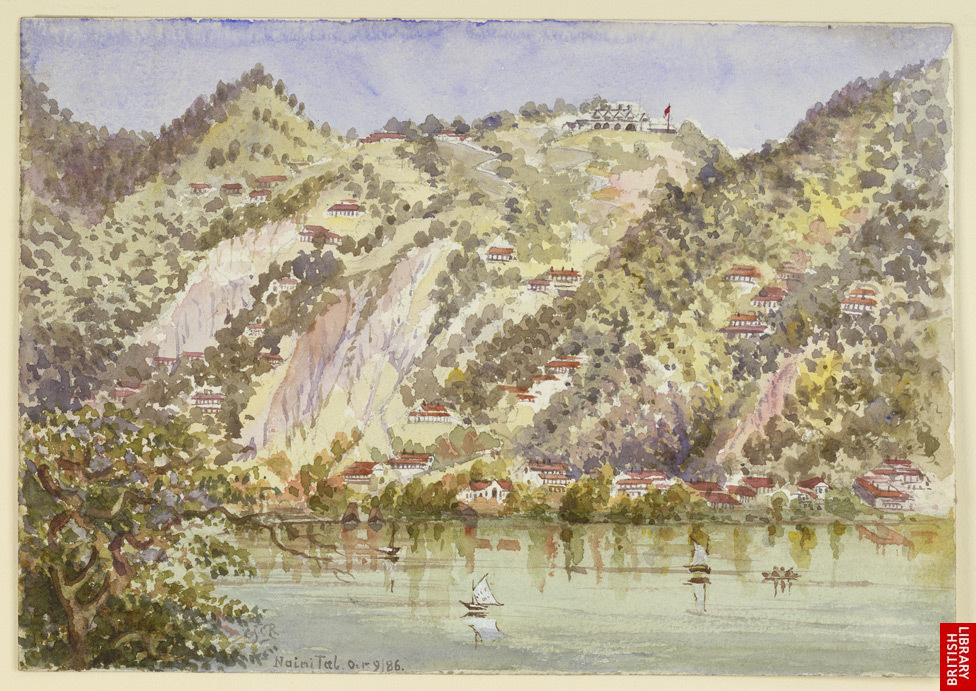
Alma Hill, Snow View and the Old Government House atop the Sher-ka-Danda Ridge in 1886. "The lake at Naini Tal (U.P.). 9 October 1886." Water-colour painting of the lake at Naini Tal in the United Provinces by Charles J. Cramer-Roberts (1834–1895), 9 October 1886. Inscribed on front in ink: 'Naini Tal. Oct 9/86. C.J.C.R.' Oriental and India Office Collection, British Library. Click to enlarge.

1900. From, Recollections of my life, by Sir Joseph Fayrer, William Blackwood and Sons, Edinburgh and London, 1900. Chapter 18. Prince of Wales' Visit to India (cont.)

8 Feb. (1876)--We were met by General Ramsay, the Hon. R. Drummond, and other officials, and drove towards the hills at a rapid, arriving at our first camp, at Baraini, on the edge of the forest which skirts the lower range of hills. Here we found numerous tents, with elephants posted here and there, and all the requirements of a shooting camp. A party, composed of the Prince, Lord Suffield, Probyn, C. Beresford, Fitz-George, Lord A. Paget, Rose, and myself, drove on as far as Kaladoongee, where we found ponies waiting to take us up to Naini Tal. Half-way up, about nine miles (14 km), we changed ponies, and found refreshments ready. I had a capital beast, and he went up the hill gallantly, trotting the whole way. In ascending, the flora gradually changes, and the pine begins just about where the plantain ends, though they may be seen growing side by side. When near Naini Tal we diverged from the path and ascended a higher ridge, where we had a fine view of the snowy ranges in the distance. Nunda Devi--over 25,000 feet (7,600 m) high--and other snowy peaks were visible. There was much cloud gathered about the lower parts of the snowy range, but the snow-capped summits were seen above. We passed the pretty little lake of the Bheem Tal, and at length, after descending from the ridge, arrived at the station of Naini Tal, with its houses picturesquely perched on ledges and terraces at various heights above the lake, which fills the crater of an extinct volcano. We were lodged at St. Loo a house belonging to Mr. Drummond, beautifully situated high above the lake. Fires were burning, and they looked quite English. It was not perceptibly colder than the previous night in the plains, though I imagine we have ascended nearly 8,000 feet (2,400 m).

== M'Crindle ==
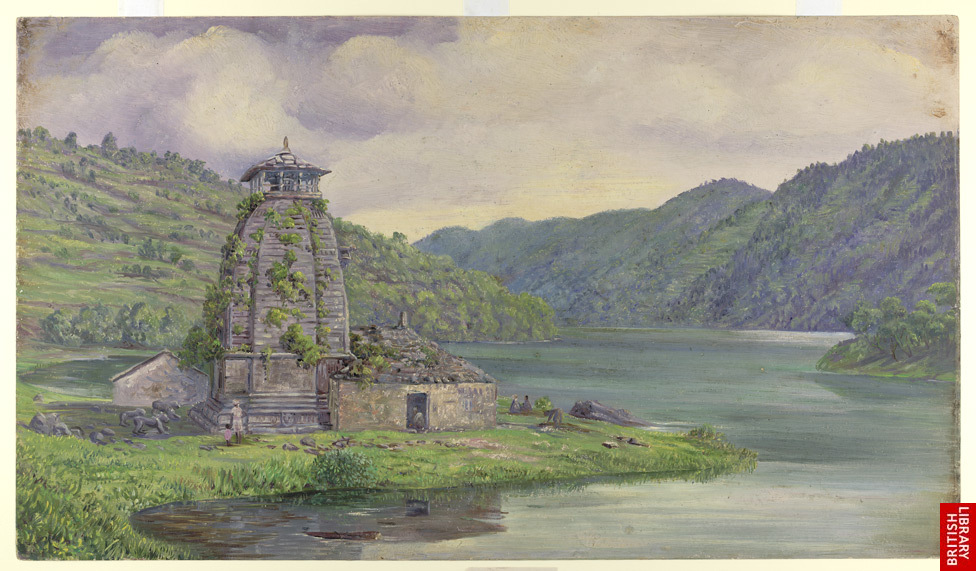
Bhim Tal in 1878. "Bheemtal. Kumaon, India. 30 July 1878." Oil painting on paper of Bhim Tal at Kumaon, by Marianne North (1830–1890), dated 30 July 1878. Oriental and India Office Collection, British Library.

1901. John Watson M'Crindle. Ancient India: As Described in Classical Literature, Archibald Constable & Company, Westminster. On page 59, the Greek Historian and Geographer Strabo (63 BC - c. 24 AD) is quoted:

"He says also that there are monkeys, rollers of rocks, which climb precipices and roll down stones upon their pursuers, and that most of the animals that are tame with us are wild in India." Footnote: "In a paper read before the Royal Irish Academy in 1884, Dr. V. Ball, referring to this passage says: "But that it is not impossible that the story may have referred to real monkeys will be apparent from the following personal experience of my own: When at Malwa Tal, a lake near Naini Tal, in the Himalayas, I was warned that in passing under a landslip, which slopes down to the lake, I should be liable to have stones thrown at me by monkeys. Regarding this as being possibly a traveller's tale, I made a particular point of going to the spot in order to see what could have given rise to it. As I approached the base of the landslip, near the road on the north side of the lake, I saw a number of brown monkeys (Inuus rhesus) rush to the sides and across the top of the landslip, and presently pieces of loosened stone and shale came tumbling down near where I stood. I fully satisfied myself that this was not merely accidental, for I distinctly saw one monkey industriously with both forepaws and with obvious malice prepense, pushing the loose shingle off a shoulder of rock. I then tried the effect of throwing stones at them, and this made them quite angry, and the number of fragments which they set rolling was speedily doubled."

== Eva Shaw McLaren ==
"Kurpa Tal where garrison class of N. Tal used to be." 1885. From Macnabb Collection (Col James Henry Erskine Reid): Album of views of 'Naini Tal.' Oriental and India Office Collection, British Library. Click on image to enlarge.

1920. From, Eva Shaw McLaren, Elsie Inglis: The Woman with the Torch, New York: The Macmillan Company.

Elsie Inglis was born on 16 August 1864, in Naini Tal, India. The wide plains of India, the "huddled hills" and valleys of the Himalayas, were the environment with which Nature surrounded her for the first twelve years of her life. Her childhood was a happy one, and the most perfect friendship existed between her and her father from her earliest days.

"All our childhood is full of remembrances of father. He never forgot our birthdays; however hot it was down in the scorched plains, when the day came round, if we were up in the hills, a large parcel would arrive from him. His very presence was joy and strength when he came to us at Naini Tal. What a remembrance there is of early breakfasts and early walks with him—the father and the three children! The table was spread in the verandah between six and seven. Father made three cups of cocoa, one for each of us, and then the glorious walk! The ponies followed behind, each with their attendant grooms, and two or three red-coated chaprassies, father stopping all along the road to talk to every native who wished to speak to him, while we three ran about, laughing and interested in everything. Then, at night, the shouting for him after we were in bed, and father's step bounding up the stair in Calcutta, or coming along the matted floor of our hill home. All order and quietness were flung to the winds while he said good-night to us."

== Premchand ==
"Nokoocheea Lake Kumaoon No. 1." 1815. Watercolour by Hyder Young Hearsey (1782–1840), of Naukuchia Tal, the Lake with Nine Corners, two miles (3 km) east of Bhim Tal, in Uttaranchal, dated 1815. Oriental and India Office Collection, British Library. Click on image to enlarge.

1921. Munshi Premchand. Godaan (or The Gift of the Cow). (Quoted from: The Gift of the Cow: A Translation of the classic Hindi novel, Godaan, by Premchand, translated by Gordon C. Roadarmel, with a new introduction by Vasudha Dalmia. Indiana University Press, 2002).

On Page 384: "By winning the case, he had reached the highest rank of zamindars. Not that he had commanded less respect than anyone else previously, but its roots were now deeper and stronger. A succession of photographs and character-sketches began appearing in the daily papers. His debts had multiplied greatly, but he was no longer concerned. He could get out of debt by just selling a small piece of the new property. The good fortune was exceeding his wildest dreams.
Previously his only house had been in Lucknow. Now it became necessary to acquire houses in three other places-Naini Tal, Mussoorie and Simla. It would detract from his new glory to visit those places and stay at a hotel or at some other raja's mansion."

On Page 385: "But the greatest triumph of his life came when his vanquished enemy, Raja Surya Pratap Sing, sent a message offering his daughter in marriage to the Rai Sahib's eldest son, Rudrapal Singh. Neither winning the election nor becoming a minister had brought the Rai Sahib such delight. Those were things of which he had dreamed, whereas this was something beyond his wildest dreams. That same Surya Pratap Singh who for months had considered him lower than his dog now wanted to marry his daughter into the family ! Incredible !
The Rai Sahib, in Naini Tal at the time the offer was made, almost burst with pride. Although he had no desire to apply any kind of pressure on the boy in regard to marriage, he was confident that Rudrapal would not create a fuss over any decision reached by his father."

On Page 390: "The Rai Sahib went straight home and had just picked up the daily paper when Mr. Tankha's card was brought in. He despised Tankha and had no desire to see even his face, but in this debilitated state of mind, he was looking for someone to sympathize. The man might be incapable of anything else, but he could at least show sympathy. The Rai Sahib called him in immediately.
Tankha came tiptoeing into the room with a mournful look on his face. Bowing all the way to the floor, he said, 'I was just leaving for Naini Tal in order too see your honour. By good fortune I've met you here. Your honour is in good health?'"

On Page 393: "'You get all carried away about human decency,' the Raja Sahib interrupted, 'and don't realize what in the world today man's bestiality is winning out over his humanity. Why are there wars otherwise? Why aren't matters settled through peaceful means such as village councils? As long as man exists, his bestiality will continue to express itself.'
A mild argument ensued and a stalemate was finally reached on the marriage question, at which the Raja Sahib got angry and left. The next day the Rai Sahib departed for Naini Tal, and a day later Rudrapal left for England with Saroj. The two men were no longer related as father and son but as adversaries."

== Jim Corbett ==
1944, Man-Eaters of Kumaon.

On Page 1: "... however, for some inexplicable reason, did not die, and was causing Government a great deal of anxiety when I visited Naini Tal four years later. Rewards were offered, special shikaris employed, and parties of Gurkhas sent out from the depot in Almora. ..." On Page 2: "...I received a visit from Berthoud. Berthoud, who was Deputy Commissioner of Naini Tal at that time, and who after ..." On Page 10: "... was about as good as finding a needle in two haystacks. Plans in plenty I had made way back in Naini Tal; one I has already tried and wild horses would not induce me to try it again, and the others-now that ..." On Page 26: "... tigress had swallowed whole were sent to me in spirits by the Tahsildar, and were buried by me in the Naini Tal lake close to the Nandadevi temples. While I had been skinning the tigress the Tahsildar and his staff, assisted by ..." On Page 27: "... the up-grades, riding him on the flat, and running behind him on the down-grades, we covered the forty-five miles to Naini Tal between 9 a. m. and 6 p. m. At a durbar held in Naini Tal a few months later Sir ..." On Page 41: "... for bait as soon as I had used up the four young male buffaloes I had brought with me from Naini Tal. The Headmen of nearby villages had now assembled, and from them I learned that the tiger had last been seen ..." etc. etc.

1948, The Man-Eating Leopard of Rudraprayag, Oxford University Press.

On page 3, "Another two miles (3 km), along the last flat bit of ground you will see for many a day, and you will have reached Rudraprayag, where you and I, my pilgrim friend, must part, for you way lies across the Alaknanda and up the left bank of the Mandakini to Kedarnath, while mine lies over the mountains to my home in Naini Tal." On page 24, "It was during one of the intervals of Gilbert and Sullivan's Yeomen of the Guard, which was showing at the Chalet Theatre in Naini Tal in 1925, that I first had any definite news of the Rudraprayag man-eater."

1954, The Temple Tigers and More Man-Eaters of Kumaon, Oxford University Press.

On Page 37: (From Muktesar Man-Eater) "EIGHTEEN MILES TO THE north-north-east of Naini Tal is a hill eight thousand feet high and twelve to fifteen miles (24 km) long, running east and west. The western end of the hill rises steeply and near this end is the Muktesar Veterinary Research Institute, ... situated on the northern face of the hill and command(s) one of the best views to be had anywhere of the Himalayan snowy range.... from a commanding point on any of the hills an uninterrupted view can be obtained not only of the snows to the north but also of the hills and valleys to the east and to the west as far as the eye can see. People who have lived in Muktesar claim that it is the most beautiful spot in Kumaon, and that its climate has no equal.... A tigress that thought as highly of the amenities of Muktesar as human beings did, took up her residence ..." On Page 58: "... sleep. Four hours later I was on the move again and at midday I was back in my home at Naini Tal after an absence of seventy-two hours. The shooting of a man-eater gives one a feeling of satisfaction . Satisfaction at having done a job that badly needed doing. Satisfaction at having out-manoeuvred, on his own ground, a very worthy antagonist. And, greatest satisfaction of all, at having made a small portion of the earth safe for a brave little girl to walk on." On Page 112: From the Talla Des Man-Eater "... confirmed my fears that my eardrum had been destroyed. A month later we moved up to our summer home at Naini Tal, and at the Ramsay Hospital I received further confirmation of this diagnosis from Colonel Barber, Civil Surgeon of Naini Tal. ..."

== Notes and references ==
- Bateman, Josiah (1860), The Life of The Right Rev. Daniel Wilson, D.D., Late Lord Bishop of Calcutta and Metropolitan of India, Volume II, John Murray, Albemarle Street, London.
- Corbett, Jim (2002) [1944], Man-Eaters of Kumaon, Oxford India Reprint
- Corbett, Jim (2002) [1948], The Man Eating Leopard of Rudraprayag, Oxford India Reprint
- Corbett, Jim (2002) [1954], The Temple Tigers and More Man-Eaters of Kumaon, Oxford India Reprint
- Fayrer, Joseph (1900), Recollections of my life, William Blackwood and Sons, Edinburgh and London
- Imperial Gazetteer of India, Volume 18, pp. 322–323., Oxford University Press, Oxford and London, 1908
- Kennedy, Dane (1996), The Magic Mountains: Hill Stations and the British Raj, University of California Press, Berkeley, Los Angeles, and Oxford. 264 pages.
- Kipling, Rudyard (1889), The Story of the Gadsbys, Macmillan and Company, London
- Kipling, Rudyard (1895), Under the Deodars, Macmillan and Company, London
- McLaren, Eva Shaw (1920), Elsie Inglis: The Woman with the Torch, Macmillan and Company, New York
- M'Crindle, J.W. (1901), Ancient India: As Described in Classical Literature, Archibald Constable & Company, Westminster
- Murphy, C.W. (1906), A Guide to Naini Tal and Kumaun, Allahbad, United Provinces
- Penny Illustrated Paper, October 2, 1880, London, 1880
- Pilgrim, (P. Barron) (1844), Notes on Wanderings in the Himmala, containing descriptions of some of the grandest scenery of the snowy range, among others of Naini Tal, Agra Akhbaar Press, Agra
- Premchand, Munshi (1921), Godaan (The Gift of the Cow: A Translation by Gordon C. Roadarmel), Indiana University Press
