= G. B. Pant High Altitude Zoo =

Pt. Govind Ballabh Pant High Altitude Zoo
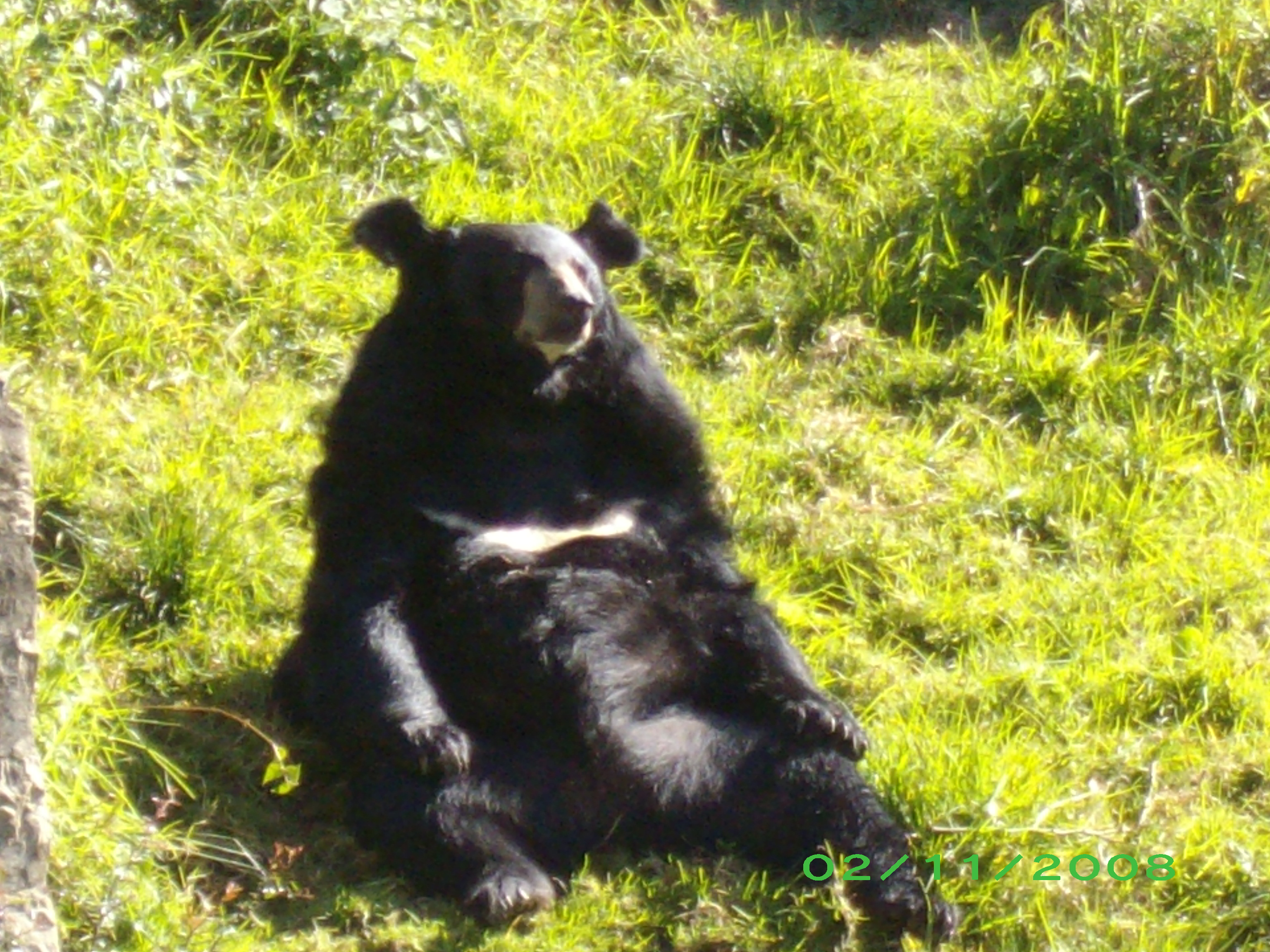
- Himalayan bear in this hilly zoo
- Interactive map of Pt. Govind Ballabh Pant High Altitude Zoo
- 29.381°N 79.469°E
- Date opened: 1 June 1995
- Location: Nainital, Kumaon, Uttarakhand, India
- Annual visitors: approx. 125,000
- Memberships: CZA
- Website: www.nainitalzoo.org.in

Pt. Govind Ballabh Pant High Altitude Zoo is a high altitude zoo situated in Nainital, Kumaon, Uttarakhand, India. Established in 1984 and opened to the public in 1995, it is situated on the Sher Ka Danda hill at a height of 2,100 metres (6,900 ft) above sea-level and is spread over 4.6 hectares (11 acres). It is the only High Altitude Zoo in north India, besides those in Darjeeling and Sikkim. Over the years it has become a popular tourist attraction.

== History ==
The zoo was established in 1984, though it was opened to visitors on 1 June 1995.

The Naintal Zoo was home to India's only Siberian tiger from 2001 until its death in November 2011. The tiger, named Kunal, was half of a pair of tigers brought from Darjeeling in 1997. His older brother, named Mahesh, died in 2001.

== Overview ==
The zoo has several endangered species of animals in the Himalayas, and animals like Royal Bengal tiger, Tibetan wolves, sambar, leopard cat and Himalayan bear. It also has a vast collection of high altitude birds, like kalij pheasant, Lady Amherst pheasant, rose ringed parakeet, golden pheasant and red junglefowl.

The zoo has night shelters for the animals, and curtains are put up in the bird enclosures during the winter months

== Geography ==
The zoo is situated at an elevation ranging from 2,100 to 2,150 metres (6,890 to 7,050 ft) above sea level between Shivalik and the Himalayas. It has a forest cover of evergreen oak, cupressus, and two other species of oak.

== Transport ==
The zoo is located about 2 kilometres (1.2 mi) uphill from Tallital Bus station in Nainital.
