= Air Heritage =

Indian regional airline operator

| IATA | ICAO | Call sign |
|---|---|---|
| 4H | — | — |
- Commenced operations: 17 January 2019
- Operating bases: Dehradun Airport (Dehradun)
- Fleet size: 3
- Destinations: 4
- Parent company: Heritage Aviation
- Headquarters: New Delhi
- Website: www.airheritage.in

Air Heritage is an air charter company in India owned by Heritage Aviation.

== About Heritage Aviation ==
Heritage Aviation is one of India’s fastest-growing helicopter and aircraft charter companies, with its main bases in New Delhi and Dehradun, Uttarakhand. Over the years, the company has built a strong reputation for reliable aviation services, especially in heli-tourism and pilgrimage travel.

The journey of Heritage Aviation began in 2009 at Guptkashi with a small helipad and a simple goal—to support pilgrims traveling to the sacred Kedarnath temple. Starting with no background in aviation or large business operations and very limited resources, the company was built on passion, dedication, and a strong commitment to service.

With time, Heritage Aviation grew into a trusted name in the aviation sector. The company has been involved in many important operations, including search and rescue missions, disaster relief work, aerial services, and pilgrimage tours in difficult and remote regions. This hands-on experience has helped build strong expertise in operating in challenging Himalayan conditions.

Heritage Aviation has also played a key role during major natural disasters. The company was among the first responders during the 2012 Uttarkashi floods, the 2013 Kedarnath tragedy, and the 2025 Dharali (Uttarkashi) disaster, supporting relief and rescue efforts for extended periods.

Today, Heritage Aviation operates one of the most diverse private aircraft fleets in India. Along with comfort and luxury, the company places the highest importance on safety. Strict maintenance standards and professional operations have helped maintain a perfect safety record since 2009.

Passengers remain the company’s greatest strength. Every journey is carefully planned to ensure smooth operations, safety, and comfort, making travel with Heritage Aviation a reliable and memorable experience.

== Chardham Packages ==
- Heritage Aviation is one of India’s leading helicopter operators and the first company to start the Chardham Yatra by helicopter in 2011. With over 15 years of experience, Heritage Aviation has gained strong expertise in managing this sacred journey. Heritage Aviation offers modern helicopters, experienced pilots, and a dedicated ground team to ensure a safe, comfortable, and smooth yatra. Heritage Aviation’s services provide excellent darshan at all temples and a memorable spiritual experience that you will cherish for a lifetime.
