= Strenger =

Strenger is a surname. Notable people with the surname include:

- Carlo Strenger (1958–2019), Swiss-Israeli psychologist, philosopher, existential psychoanalyst, and public intellectual
- Rich Strenger (born 1960), American football player

== See also ==
- Stringer (name)
