= Shinuh Lee =

South Korean composer (born 1969)

- Born: February 15, 1969 (age 57)
- Education: Seoul National University; University of London; Alumni of the University of Sussex
- Occupation: Composer

Shinuh Lee (Korean: 이신우; born February 15, 1969) is a South Korean composer of contemporary classical music. Royal Academy of Music recently announced Shinuh Lee as Associate of the Royal Academy of Music (ARAM).

== Biography ==
Shinuh Lee started her career as a composer when she took her first composition lessons with Unsuk Chin. Lee studied composition with Kang Sukhi at Seoul National University, and later with Michael Finnissy at the Royal Academy of Music, the University of London, and the University of Sussex in the United Kingdom. While she studied in the UK, Lee won a number of prizes from various competitions and music festivals, which include the Musical Times Composers' Competition, Cornelius Cardew Composers' Competition, and was a finalist at ISCM World Music Days, Gaudeamus International Composers Award, and Leonard Bernstein International Jerusalem Composing Competition. After returning to Korea, she also received Korean Composition Award, AhnEakTae Composition Award, Grand Prize for the Korean Race Composition Award, Nanpa Music Award, and the Young Artist Today Award from the Ministry of Culture and Tourism in Korea. She is now Professor of composition at Seoul National University.

== Education ==
- Seoul National University (B.Mus) (1991)
- Royal Academy of Music, U.K (Dip.RAM) (1993)
- University of London, U.K (M.Mus) (1994)
- University of Sussex, U.K (D.Phil) (1998)

== Awards ==
- The 21st Seoul Music Festival 1989, Korea
- Royal Philharmonic Society Prize for Composer 1991, UK
- Gaudeamus International Composers’ Competition 1992, Amsterdam – finalist composer
- Cornelius Cardew Composition Prize 1993, UK
- Musical Times Composers’ Competition 1993, UK
- Leonard Bernstein International Jerusalem Composing Competition 1997, Israel – finalist composer
- AhnIckTae Composition Prize 1997, Korea
- Nampa Music Award 2001, Korea
- Korean Race Composition Award 2000, Korea
- Young Artist Today Award from the Ministry of Culture and Tourism 2001, Korea
- Korea composition award 1998, Korea
- Associate of the Royal Academy of Music 2019, RAM, U.K.

== Compositions ==
- 1989 String Quartet No. 1 <Maek> – 15'
- 1990 <Space> for flute, clarinet in Bb and piano – 8'
- 1991 <Analogy> for solo oboe and ensemble – 7’
- 1993 <Expression> for cello – 11’
- 1993 Microseries II <Series> for viola – 5’
- 1994 Wind Quintet No. 1 <Micropolyphony> – 12’
- 1996 Microseries IV. <Sonority> for two bassoons and piano – 8’
- 1997 <Po’tae-pyong> for bassoon and ensemble – 12’
- 1994/96 <Psalm 20> for orchestra – 20’
- 2007/09 Chorale Fantasy No. 1 <Comfort, comfort my people> – 45’
- 2009/10 Concerto for clarinet and orchestra – 20’
- 2010 Chorale Fantasy No. 3 <Alleluia> for piano – 7’
- 2011 <Lament> for clarinet and strings – 23’
- 2013 <Psalm Sonata> for violin and piano – 25’
- 2013 Chorale Fantasy No. 2 <The Collar> – 15’
- 2014 <Lament, O – the daughter of Zion> for flute and piano – 17’
- 2016 <Psalmody> for solo violoncello – 10’
