= Jimmy Stringer =

English footballer (1879–1933)

Personal information
- Full name: James Stringer
- Date of birth: 1879
- Place of birth: Old Hill, England
- Date of death: 1933 (aged 53–54)
- Position: Goalkeeper

Senior career*
Years	Team	Apps	(Gls)
1900–1901	Netherton Rovers		
1901–1904	Wolverhampton Wanderers	15	(0)
1904–1910	West Bromwich Albion	160	(0)
1910	Dudley Town		
Total		175	(0)
- * Club domestic league appearances and goals

James Stringer (1879–1933) was an English footballer who played in the Football League for West Bromwich Albion and Wolverhampton Wanderers.
