= Young-ja Lee (composer) =

South Korean music educator and composer (born 1931)

- Hangul: 이영자
- Hanja: 李英子
- RR: I Yeongja
- MR: I Yŏngja

Young-ja Lee (Korean: 이영자; born 4 June 1931) is a South Korean music educator and composer. She is considered by many the greatest living female Korean composer.

== Life and career ==
Born in Wonju, Lee studied at Ewha Womans University, the Conservatoire de Paris, and the Royal Conservatory of Brussels. She continued her education at the Manhattan School of Music. Lee endured hardships during the Japanese occupation and Korean War, but emerged to become one of the dominant forces in Korean music in the 20th century.

Lee was one of the six founding members of the Korean Society of Women Composers and served as the first president of the organization. She is often called the "Face and Mother of Korean Modern Music." Her works have been performed internationally and are available as recordings.

Young-Ja Lee's music combines elements from French, West African, Indonesian gamelan, and traditional Korean music, creating unusual intercultural compositions. She is also noted for her particular mixtures of Western and Korean music.

== Works ==
Selected works include:

- Pelerinage de l’Ame for Violin, Cello, and Piano
- Trio for flute, clarinet and bassoon
- Variations for piano
- Lament for three kotos
- Six songs
- Réminiscences de la Proven
