= Chan-hae Lee =

South Korean musician (born 1945)

- Hangul: 이찬해
- Hanja: 李燦解
- RR: I Chanhae
- MR: I Ch'anhae

Chan-hae Lee (born 8 October 1945) is a South Korean music educator and composer.

== Life ==
Chan-Hae Lee was born in Seoul, Korea, and studied composition at Yonsei University in Seoul with Jae-Yul Park and Un-Young La. She continued her studies with George T. Jones and Conrad Bernier at Catholic University in Washington, D.C., graduating with a MA and PhD. Later she attended seminars and festivals, studying the Kodály method in Hungary in 1989, and was a visiting scholar at Oakland University and the Paris Conservatory.

After completing her education, she took a position in 1977 as professor of composition at Yonsei University. She has also served as visiting professor at Wayne State University. Lee has received The National Composition Prize of Korea and her works have been performed internationally.

== Works ==
Selected works include:

- With for trombone and string quartet
- Back to the Origins, opera
- The Rabbit Story
