= DaeSeob Han =

South Korean musician (born 1977)

DaeSeob Han (born February 6, 1977, in Seoul) is a South Korean composer of European classical music, based in Korea and Germany.

Han writes concert music (chamber and orchestral works) as well as contemporary art.

== Biography ==
- 2013 Konzertexamen Komposition HfM Weimar
- 2009 Diplom K.A. Komposition HfM Weimar
- 2007 Vordiplom Komposition Hochschule für Musik "Franz Liszt", Weimar, Germany

== Selected works ==
- 2015/19 point pooints pooointss... for string orchestra
- 2014 Kentridge in the Moon for Flute, Violin, Cello and Percussion
- 2014 Words of Warning for Reader and Brass Ensemble
- 2014 Vertigo for violin solo
- 2013 Her Gentle Gaze for flute, clarinet, violin, cello, percussion and piano
- 2013 Oz's Wonderful Adventures for piano solo
- 2012 Polyptyque lumineux pour orchestre
- 2012 20Hz for string quartet
- 2011 Amorphing for large orchestra
- 2008 Evening air for violin, cello and piano
- 2006 Das Flüstern einer Sirene für Flöte Solo

== Awards ==
- 2014 The 32nd ACL Conference and Festival in Japan
- 2013 "Hwaum Project Festival", Call for Score
- 2013 International Composition Competition for Orchestra of Weimarer Frühjahrstage für zeitgenössische Musik, 1st Prize and Audience Award, Date: 06. Apr. 2013, Place: E-Werk Weimar in Germany, Performance: Jenaer Philharmonie, Conductor: Marcus L. Frank
- 2011 National Creative Music Festival in Korea
- 2010 The Molinari Quartet's Fourth International Composition Competition in Canada, 3rd Prize, Date: 14. May. 2009, Place: Chapelle historique du Bon-Pasteur in Canada, Performance: Quartuor Molinari
- 2008 Camillo Togni' International Composition competition in Italy, Date: 24. Nov. 2008, Place: Auditorium San Barnaba-Brescia in Italy, Performance: Dedalo Ensemble, Conductor: Vittorio Parisi
- 2007 National Composition Competition of Music Colleges in Germany, 1st Prize, Date: 22. May. 2006, Place: Konzertsaal der HfMDK Stuttgart
- 2007 International Pan Music Festival under the direction of the ISCM Section
- 2002 DaeJeon International Contemporary Music Festival
- 1999 Nanpa Music Festival Composition Prize, 3rd Prize
- 1997 Seoul contemporary music festival
