= Oh Sook-ja =

South Korean composer (born 1941)

- Born: 26 May 1941 (age 85); Seoul, Korea
- Education: Kyung Hee University; Peabody College

Korean name
- Hangul: 오숙자
- RR: O Sukja
- MR: O Sukcha

Sook-Ja Oh (born 26 May 1941) is a South Korean composer. She was born in Seoul, Korea and studied at Kyung Hee University, where she received a Bachelor of Arts in 1971 and a Master of Arts in 1973. She continued her studies in electronic music at Peabody College in the United States, and in orchestral conducting at the Mozarteum in Salzburg.

== Works ==
Selected works include:

- From the East cello and guitar (1995)
- Monologue (1992)
- A Water Drop
- Art Songs (1977)
