= Stringer (slag) =

Stringers are filaments of slag left in wrought iron after the production process. In their correct proportions their presence is beneficial, as they help to control the ductility of the finished product, but when the proportion of slag is too high, or when the filaments run at right angles to the direction of tension, they can cause weakness.

== Manufacture ==
Wrought iron is no longer made. The particles of slag present in the iron after preparation by puddling were drawn into long fibres during the forging or rolling process. The proportion of slag was intended to be about 3%, but the process was difficult to control and examples with up to 10% slag were produced.

== Applications ==
Stays made from puddled iron bar were used as a cheaper alternative to copper for joining the inner and outer firebox plates of steam locomotives. The incorporated stringers gave flexibility akin to stranded wire rope and stays made of the material were therefore resistant to snapping in service. Wrought iron rivets made from iron bar typically contained stringer filaments running the length of the rivet, but filaments at right angles to the tension, particularly beneath the head, caused weakness.

== See also ==
Anisotropy
