= Lim Jun-hee =

South Korean composer

Lim June-Hee (임준희, 1959, Oct. 10~) is a South Korean composer and professor at Korea National University of Arts. Her opera The Wedding (이쁜이의 혼례) premiered in Beijing in 2012.
