= John Stringer (composer) =

British composer, oboist, conductor and academic

John Stringer is a British composer, oboist, conductor and academic.

== Early life and education ==
John Stringer was born in Newcastle and studied at the University of Huddersfield. Following an undergraduate degree in music, Stringer went on to complete postgraduate study and a PhD at the University of York where he is now a senior lecturer and teaches modules in Mahler, Birtwistle, Composition and Conducting. His music is published by the University of York Music Press.

== Career ==
As composer and conductor, Stringer has worked with the Orchestra of Opera North, Philharmonia and BBC Symphony Orchestra, Basel Soloists, Corrente Ensemble, Black Hair, New Music Players, de ereprijs, Apollo Saxophone Quartet and the 4Mality Percussion Quartet. He is also Assistant Conductor with the City of Leeds Youth Orchestra.

As a conductor and oboist, he has also worked with Jonathan Harvey, James Wood, Hanna Kulenty, Richard Ayres, Hans Abrahamsen, Stephen Montague, Robert Saxton, and Karlheinz Stockhausen.

His works have been performed across the UK, Europe, Japan, and the United States.

== Key works ==
- Hinterland (1999, piano quintet)
- The Shifting Point (2001, viola and piano)
- Lied: Red Elegy (2007, cello)
- Disquiet (2009, solo piano)
- Disquiet II (2012; chamber ensemble)
- Tondal's Vision (2012; orchestra)

== Discography ==
- Hinterland - Dark Inventions,
