= Jeajoon Ryu =

South Korean composer (born 1970)

- Born: 1970 (age 55–56)
- Education: Kraków Music Academy and Seoul National University
- Occupations: Composer, artistic director
- Organization: Seoul International Music Festival
- Website: https://www.youtube.com/user/jeajoonryu70

Jeajoon Ryu (born 1970) is a South Korean composer. His works have been by performed some of the world's leading orchestras, such as the Royal Philharmonic Orchestra (RPO), l'Orchestre régional de Cannes-Provence-Alpes-Côte d’Azur (ORCPACA), the Helsinki Philharmonic Orchestra (Helsingin kaupunginorkesteri), and the Polish Radio Symphony Orchestra. He was the artistic director of Seoul International Music Festival from 2009 to 2010 and a composer of Poland Gozow Philharmonic Orchestra from 2011 to 2012. Artists such as Arto Noras, Michel Lethiec, Ralf Gothoni, Li-Wei Qin, Shanghai Quartet, Juyung Baek, So-Ock Kim, Johannes Moser and Ilya Gringolts have performed his works.

== Education ==
He studied composition under Krzysztof Penderecki at Kraków Music Academy as well as under Kang, Suk-hi at Seoul National University.

== Career ==
His music has been given numerous critically acclaimed around the world and at the Cadogan Hall, Verdi Hall in Milan, Warsaw Philharmonic Concert Hall, and Helsinki Music Centre. He was invited to the Naantali Music Festival (Finland) and Mecklenburg Music Festival (Germany) as guest composer and jury member of international Violin Competition of Astana.

His violin concerto and Sinfonia da Requiem were recorded on Naxos International Label in (2009), and his violin sonata was recorded on Telos Music (2010). In 2015 he has been honored by the Polish Minister of Culture and received the National Heritage the Gloria Artis Medal.

Currently, Ryu is the artistic director of the Seoul International Music Festival in Korea. He also founded Ensemble OPUS and became artistic director.

== Recordings ==
- RYU, Jeajoon: Sinfonia da Requiem / Violin Concerto No. 1 CD, 2008 Naxos
- RYU, Jeajoon: Sonata for Violin and Piano 'Spring' CD, 2010 telos
- RYU, Jeajoon: Cello Concerto / Marimba Concerto / Overture: Il nome della Rosa CD, 2016 RPO

== Works ==
Symphony

- Sinfonia da Requiem For Soprano, Choir and Orchestra (2007)

Orchestral Works

- Overture “Il nome della Rosa” (2010)
- Cantata ‘Rubna Crux’ (1999)
- Symphonic Poem (1996)

String Orchestra

- Sinfonietta per archi (2015)
- 'Rosso' for Strings (2008)

Concerto

- Concerto per piano e orchestra (2017)
- Concerto per marimba e orchestra (2015)
- String Quartet Concerto (2013)
- Concerto per violoncello ed orchestra (2010)
- Concerto per violin ed orchestra (2006)
- Cello Concerto No. 1 (2001)

Chamber

- Quintetto per clarinetto e quartetto d'archi (2015)
- Sonata per violin e pianoforte No.2 (2014)
- Sonata per clarinetto e pianoforte (2013)
- Quintet per marimba e string quartet (2012)
- String Quartet (2012)
- Sonata per violoncello e pianoforte (2011)
- ‘Early summer’ Trio per violin, violoncello e pianoforte (2009)
- Sonata ‘Primavera'per violino e pianoforte No.1 (2008)
- Bach in our Age for Piano trio (2001)
- Saxophone Sonata (2000)
- Dialogue per Violin, Clarinet e Pianoforte (1995)

Electronic Music

- The Bright Light for Electronic Sound (1997)

Solo

- Baroque suite per pianoforte (2013)
- Caproccio per violino (2012)
- Fugues (2004)
- Passacaglia per Percussion (2002)
