= John Bentley Stringer =

British computer scientist

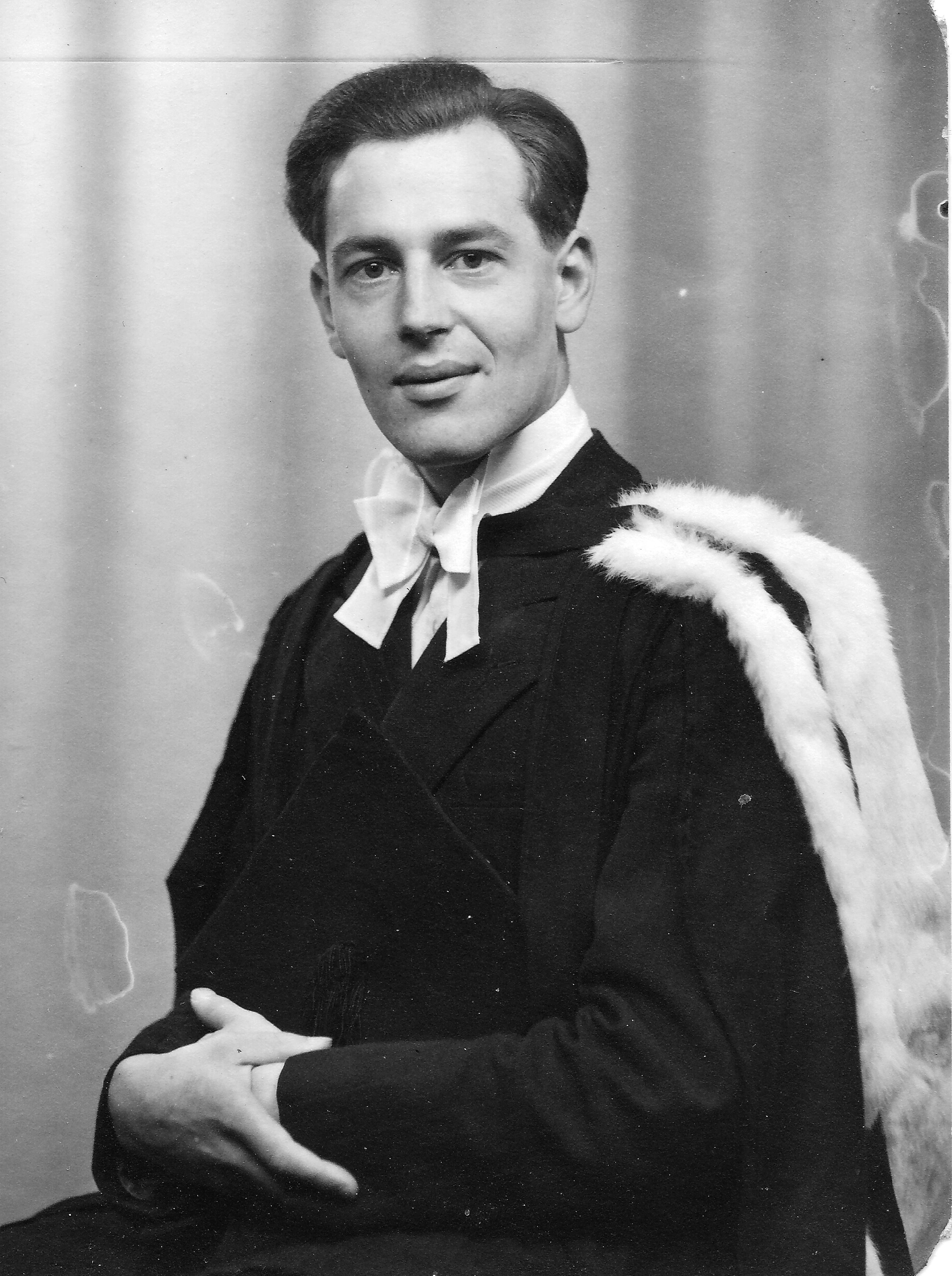
- Born: 17 February 1928
- Died: 4 May 1979 (aged 51); Cheltenham
- Known for: Microprogramming
- Scientific career
- Fields: Computer Science
- Workplaces: University of Cambridge Mathematical Laboratory; National Physical Laboratory; Government Communications Headquarters

John Bentley Stringer (17 February 1928 – 4 May 1979) was a British computer pioneer. At Cambridge Maths Lab he worked with Maurice Wilkes creating the concept of microcode. He then became a civil servant firstly at the National Physical Laboratory then at the Government Communications Headquarters.

== Publications ==
- Wilkes, M. V.; Stringer, J. B. (April 1953). "Microprogramming and the Design of the Control Circuits in an Electronic Digital Computer". Mathematical Proceedings of the Cambridge Philosophical Society. 49 (2): 230–238. Bibcode:1953PCPS...49..230W. doi:10.1017/S0305004100028322.
- Blake, P. K.; Clayden, D. O.; Davies, D. W.; Page, L. J.; Stringer, J. B. (May 1957). Some features of the ACE computer (Report). National Physical Laboratory. p. 40.
- Stringer, J. B. (1961). "The Place of Character Recognition, Data Transmission and Document Handling in A.D.P. Systems". The Computer Journal. 4 (2): 161–167. doi:10.1093/comjnl/4.2.161.
- Bennett, R. O.; Stringer, J. B. (1961). "Acceptance Trials of Computer Systems for Government Use". The Computer Journal. 4 (3): 185–196. doi:10.1093/comjnl/4.3.185.
- Stringer, J. B. (1964). "Book Review: Redundancy Techniques for Computing Systems, by Richard H. Wilcox and William C. Mann". The Computer Journal. 6 (4): 303–304. doi:10.1093/comjnl/6.4.303.
