= Kyungsun Suh =

South Korean composer (born 1942)

- Born: 8 November 1942 (age 83); Seoul, Korea
- Education: Seoul National University; University of Massachusetts Amherst
- Employer: Hanyang University (emeritus)

Korean name
- Hangul: 서경선
- RR: Seo Gyeongseon
- MR: Sŏ Kyŏngsŏn

Kyungsun Suh (born 8 November 1942) is a South Korean composer.

== Biography ==
Kyungsun Suh was born in Seoul, Korea. She studied composition and theory at the Seoul National University, graduating with bachelor's and master's degrees, and at the University of Massachusetts Amherst. After completing her studies she took a position teaching at Hanyang University in 1974. Her works have been performed internationally.

Suh served as president of the Korean Society of Women Composers from 1993 to 1997. She organized the Asian Contemporary Music Festivals in Seoul and Suwon in 1993 and 2002. She received the Okwan (Jade) Medal of Culture from South Korea's Ministry of Culture and Tourism, and an Arts Award from the Arts Council of Korea in 2005. She is professor emeritus at Hanyang University.

== Works ==
Suh has composed for orchestra, chamber ensemble, voice and solo instrument. Selected works include:

- An Illusion (환) (1977)
- Phenomenon I (현상 I) (1982)
- Three Songs for Autumn (1987)
- Pentastich (오행시곡) (1987)
- At the Soo-kook (수국에서) (1991)
- Poem (시곡) (1992)
- Poem for orchestra (관현악을 위한 시곡) (1994)
