= List of composers by nationality =

The following is a list of composers by nationality.

== Albania ==
- Simon Gjoni (1926–1991), composer of orchestral and piano pieces
- Tonin Harapi (1925–1991)
- Agim Krajka (1937–2021), composer of the National Song Festival
- Aleksandër Peçi (born 1951)
- Çesk Zadeja (1927–1997), often nicknamed the "Father of Albanian music"

== Argentina ==
- Antonio Agri (1932–1998)
- Tito Alberti (1923–2009)
- Amancio Jacinto Alcorta (1805–1862)
- Casimiro Alcorta (1840–1913)
- Athy (harpist) (born 1984)
- Luis Bacalov (1933–2017)
- Gato Barbieri (1932–2016)
- Lautaro Bellucca (born 1986)
- José Bragato (1915–2017)
- Claudia Brant (born 1966)
- Jorge Calandrelli (born 1939)
- Sergio Calligaris (born 1941)
- Miguel Caló (1907–1972)
- Francisco de Caro (1898–1976)
- Julio de Caro (1899–1980)
- Cacho Castaña (1942–2019)
- Cátulo Castillo (1906–1975)
- Juan José Castro (1895–1968)
- Guillermo Carlos Cazenave (born 1955)
- Alejandro Civilotti (born 1959)
- Tránsito Cocomarola (1918–1974)
- Al Conti (born 1968)
- Ellen C. Covito (born 1974)
- Eloísa D'Herbil (1847–1943)
- Lucio Demare (1906–1974)
- Enrique Santos Discépolo (1901–1951)
- Celestino Piaggio (1886–1931)
- Fernando Egozcue (born 1959)
- Pablo Elorza (born 1982)
- Sebastián Escofet (born 1968)
- Juan Pedro Esnaola (1808–1878)
- Mariano Etkin (1943–2016)
- Don Fabian
- Eduardo Falú (1923–2013)
- Juan Falú (born 1948)
- Lourdes Cecilia Fernández (born 1981)
- Juan de Dios Filiberto (1885–1964)
- Roberto Firpo (1884–1969)
- Enrique Mario Francini (1916–1978)
- Carlos Franzetti (born 1948)
- Osvaldo Fresedo (1897–1984)
- Gerardo Gandini (1936–2013)
- Juan Garcia Estrada (1895–1961)
- Augusto Gentile (1891–1932)
- Gilardo Gilardi (1889–1963)
- Alberto Ginastera (1916–1983), ballet, classical
- Carlos Grätzer (born 1956)
- Vicente Greco (1888–1924)
- Adrián Iaies (born 1960)
- César Isella (1938–2021)
- Mauricio Kagel (1931–2008)
- Emilio Kauderer
- Gaby Kerpel (born 1965)
- Guillermo Klein (born 1969)
- Marcelo Koc (1918–2006)
- Bernardo Kuczer (born 1955)
- Martin Kutnowski
- Marta Lambertini (1937–2019)
- Pablo Lescano (born 1977)
- Analia Llugdar (born 1972)
- Enrique Maciel (1897–1962)
- Isidro B. Maiztegui (1905–1996)
- Héctor Marcó (1906–1987)
- Martín Matalon (born 1958)
- Esteban Mellino (1945–2008)
- Rosita Melo (1897–1981)
- Rosendo Mendizábal (1868–1913)
- Sandra Mihanovich (born 1957)
- Silvina Milstein (born 1956)
- Ben Molar (1915–2015)
- Cholo Montironi (born 1931)
- Mariano Mores (1918–2016)
- Ricardo Moyano (born 1961)
- Martin Musaubach (born 1982)
- Fernando Otero (born 1972)
- Juan Pampin (born 1967)
- Fabián Panisello (born 1963)
- Ettore Panizza (1875–1967)
- Blas Parera (1777–1840)
- Amy Patterson (1912–2019)
- Paula Nenette Pepin (1908–1990)
- Marcelo Peralta (1961–2020)
- Osmán Pérez Freire (1878–1930)
- Astor Piazzolla (1921–1992)
- Raúl Porchetto (born 1949)
- Osvaldo Pugliese (1905–1995)
- Rodrigo Ratier (born 1969)
- Sol Rezza (born 1982)
- Tito Ribero (1915–1964)
- Waldo de los Ríos (1934–1977)
- Julián Robledo (1887–1940)
- Zenón Rolón (1856–1902)
- Enrique Saborido (1877–1941)
- Gustavo Santaolalla (born 1951)
- Sebastian Schneider (born 1982)
- Pía Sebastiani (1925–2015)
- Alberto Soriano (1915–1981)
- Julio Sosa (guitarist)
- Chango Spasiuk (born 1968)
- Atilio Stampone (1926–2022)
- Oscar Strasnoy (born 1970)
- Daniel Tinte (born 1969)
- Pil Trafa (born 1959)
- Terig Tucci (1897–1973)
- Elvino Vardaro (1905–1971)
- Sebastian Volco (born 1973)
- María Elena Walsh (1930–2011)
- Alberto Williams (1862–1952)
- Luis Zubillaga (1928–1995)

== Armenia ==
- Soghomon Soghomonian Komitas (26 Sept 1869 – 22 Oct 1935)

== Australia ==
- Roy Agnew (1898–1941)
- Hugo Alpen (1842–1917)
- Brenton Broadstock (born 1952)
- Arthur Chanter (1866–1950)
- Alice Charbonnet-Kellermann (1858–1914)
- Percy Code (1888–1953)
- Cesare Cutolo (1826–1867)
- Vince Courtney (–1951)
- George De Cairos Rego (1858–1946)
- Ruby Claudia Davy (1883–1946)
- George Savin De Chanéet (1861–1926)
- John Albert Delany (1852–1907)
- Herbert De Pinna (1880–1936)
- Frederick Ellard (1824–1874)
- Mary Finsterer (born 1962)
- Edwin Fowles (1871–1945)
- Percy Grainger (1882–1961)
- Stuart Greenbaum (born 1966)
- Christian Helleman (1880–1954)
- Alfred Hill (1869–1960)
- Phillip Houghton (1954–2017)
- Guglielmo Enrico Lardelli (1857–1910)
- Louis Lavater (1867–1953)
- Alexander Frame Lithgow (1870–1929)
- Richard Meale (1932–2009)
- Isaac Nathan (1791–1864)
- Albert Bokhare Saunders (1880–1946)
- Reginald Stoneham (1879–1942)
- Joseph Summers (1839–1917)
- May Summerbelle (1867–1914)
- Peter Sculthorpe (1929–2014)
- Alfred Wheeler (1865–1949)
- Nigel Westlake (born 1958)

== Azerbaijan ==
- Fikret Amirov (1922–1984)
- Nariman Azimov (1936–2016)
- Gara Garayev (1918–1982)
- Uzeyir Hajibeyov (1885–1948)
- Muslim Magomaev (1942–2008)
- Soltan Hajibeyov (1919–1974)
- Said Rustamov (1907–1983)
- Rauf Hajiyev (1922–1995)
- Jahangir Jahangirov (1921–1992)
- Tofig Guliyev (1917–2000)
- Vagif Mustafazade (1940–1979)
- Rafig Babayev (1937–1994)
- Arif Malikov (1933–2019)
- Frangiz Ali-Zadeh (born 1947)
- Jovdat Hajiyev (1917–2002)
- Rauf Hajiyev (1922–1995)
- Faraj Garayev (born 1943)

== Belgium ==
- Jean Absil (1893–1974)
- Jean-Baptiste Accolay (1833–1900)
- Karel Albert (1901–1987)
- Flor Alpaerts (1875–1954)
- August Baeyens (1895–1966)
- Peter Benoit (1834–1901), founder of the Royal Conservatoire of Antwerp
- Charles Auguste de Bériot (1802–1870), founder of the Belgian violin school
- Jan Blockx (1851–1912), founder of the Antwerp Opera House
- August de Boeck (1865–1937)
- Luc Brewaeys (1959–2015)
- Dirk Brossé (born 1960)
- Boudewijn Buckinx (born 1945)
- Joseph Callaerts (1830–1901)
- Jacques Calonne (1930–2022)
- Roland Cardon (1929–2001)
- Jean de Castro (1540–1611)
- Peeter Cornet (1575–1633)
- Alain Crépin (born 1954)
- Arthur De Greef (1862–1940)
- Thierry De Mey (born 1956)
- Eva Dell'Acqua (1856–1930)
- Frédéric Devreese (1929–2020)
- Albert Dupuis (1877–1967)
- Sylvain Dupuis (1856–1931)
- Johan Evenepoel (born 1965)
- Ernest van der Eyken (1913–2010)
- François-Joseph Fétis (1784–1871)
- Jean-Joseph Fiocco (1696–1746)
- Joseph-Hector Fiocco (1703–1741)
- Bernard Foccroulle (born 1953)
- Jacqueline Fontyn (born 1930)
- François-Auguste Gevaert (1828–1908), composer of the Belgian colonial hymn
- Frans Geysen (born 1936)
- Pierre De Geyter (1848–1932)
- Matthias Vanden Gheyn (1721–1785)
- Paul Gilson (1865–1942)
- Lucien Goethals (1932–2006)
- Karel Goeyvaerts (1923–1999)
- Jacques Gregoir (1817–1876)
- André Grétry (1741–1813)
- Albert Grisar (1808–1869)
- Richard de Guide (1909–1962)
- Carolus Hacquart (1640–1701)
- Alphonse Hasselmans (1845–1912)
- Wim Henderickx (born 1962)
- Robert Herberigs (1886–1974)
- Léonard de Hodémont (1575–1639)
- Johan Hoogewijs (born 1957)
- Luc van Hove (born 1957)
- Walter Hus (born 1959)
- Albert Huybrechts (1899–1938)
- Heinrich Isaac (1450–1517)
- Joseph Jongen (1873–1953)
- Joannes Florentius a Kempis (1635–1711)
- Pierre Kolp (born 1969)
- André Laporte (born 1931)
- Paul Lebrun (1863–1920)
- Claude Ledoux (composer) (born 1960)
- Pierre Leemans (1897–1980)
- Vic Legley (1915–1994)
- Guillaume Lekeu (1870–1894)
- Jacques-Nicolas Lemmens (1823–1881)
- Armand Limnander (1814–1892)
- Jacques Loeillet (1685–1748)
- Jean Baptiste Loeillet of Ghent (1688–1720)
- Jef Maes (1905–1996)
- Pierre van Maldere (1729–1768)
- Paul de Maleingreau (1887–1956)
- Martin Pierre Marsick (1847–1924)
- Martin-Joseph Mengal (1784–1851)
- Wim Mertens (born 1953)
- Karel Miry (1823–1889), composer of the Flemish national hymn
- Jérôme-Joseph de Momigny (1762–1842)
- Arie Van de Moortel (1918–1976)
- Lodewijk Mortelmans (1868–1952)
- Johannes Ockeghem (1410–1497)
- Willy Ostijn (1913–1993)
- Flor Peeters (1903–1986)
- Marcel Poot (1901–1988)
- Henri Pousseur (1929–2009)
- Marcel Quinet (1915–1986)
- Jean-Théodore Radoux (1835–1911)
- Godfried-Willem Raes (born 1952)
- Jan Rijspoort (late 16th century)
- Peter Ritzen (born 1956)
- Joseph Ryelandt (1870–1965)
- Adolphe Samuel (1824–1898)
- Adrien-François Servais (1807–1866)
- André Souris (1899–1970)
- Daniel Sternefeld (1905–1986)
- André Stordeur (1941–2020)
- Rudi Tas (born 1957)
- Edgar Tinel (1854–1912)
- Alexander Utendal (1543–1581)
- Yolande Uyttenhove (1925–2000)
- Johan Van Barel (born 1964)
- François van Campenhout (1779–1848), composer of the Belgian National hymn
- Jan Van der Roost (born 1956)
- Jules Van Nuffel (1883–1953)
- Annette Vande Gorne (born 1946)
- Maurice Vaute (1913–2000)
- Lucie Vellère (1896–1966)
- Carl Verbraeken (born 1950), president of the Union of Belgian Composers
- Henri Vieuxtemps (1820–1881)
- Josée Vigneron-Ramackers (1914–2002)
- Berthe di Vito-Delvaux (1915–2005)
- Joséphine-Rosalie de Walckiers (1756–1836)
- Henry Wyn
- Eugène Ysaÿe (1858–1931)

== Bolivia ==
- Asunta Limpias de Parada (1915–1995)

== Bosnia and Herzegovina ==
- Sinan Alimanović (born 1954)
- Anđelka Bego-Šimunić (born 1941)
- Franciscus Bossinensis (1485–1535)
- Rade Jovanović (1928–1986)
- Vuk Kulenovic (1946–2017)
- Mladen Milicevic (born 1958)
- Dino Rešidbegović (born 1975)
- Ališer Sijarić (born 1969)
- Aleksa Šantić (1868–1924)
- Dino Zonić (born ?)

== Brazil ==
- Ernani Aguiar (born 1950)
- Jorge Antunes (born 1942)
- Francisco Braga (1868–1945), composer of operas, piano and symphonic works.
- Oscar Lorenzo Fernández (1897–1948)
- Sílvio Ferraz (born 1959)
- Antônio Carlos Gomes (1836–1896), celebrated opera composer in Italy, 19th century
- Mozart Camargo Guarnieri (1907–1993)
- José Maurício Nunes Garcia (1767–1830), composer of classical era; priest, wrote both sacred and secular music.
- Radamés Gnatalli (1906–1988)
- César Guerra-Peixe (1914–1993)
- Osvaldo Lacerda (1927–2011)
- Elias Álvares Lobo (1834–1901), composer of sacred and secular music; wrote first Brazilian opera.
- Alexandre Levy (1864–1892)
- Emerico Lobo de Mesquita (1746–1805)
- Francisco Mignone (1897–1986)
- Ronaldo Miranda (born 1948)
- Alberto Nepomuceno (1864–1920)
- Marlos Nobre (born 1939)
- José Antônio Rezende de Almeida Prado (1943–2010)
- Cláudio Santoro (1919–1989)
- Heitor Villa-Lobos (1887–1959), one of the most performed Brazilian composers worldwide
- José Carlos Amaral Vieira (born 1952)
- Edson Zampronha (born 1963)

== Bulgaria ==
- Georgi Arnaoudov (born 1957), composer of stage, orchestral, chamber, film, vocal and piano music
- Alexandra Fol (born 1981), composer and organist, currently writing her dissertation at McGill University's Schulich School of Music
- Marin Goleminov (1908–2000), composer, violinist, conductor
- Michail Goleminov (born 1956), composer, pianist, conductor, and co-founder of music publishing house The Orange Factory
- Dobri Hristov (1875–1941), composer of choral music as well as music for the church and orchestra
- Petar Krumov (born 1934), composer, arranger, conductor and expert on Bulgarian folk music
- Filip Kutev (1903–1982), composer, arranger and founder of Bulgaria's State Ensemble for Folk Song and Dance
- Kiril Lambov (born 1955) composer, pianist, and conductor
- Milcho Leviev (1937–2019), composer, arranger, jazz performer and pianist
- Emanuil Manolov (1860–1902), composed the first Bulgarian opera Siromahkinia based on the work of Ivan Vazov with the same title
- Albena Petrovic-Vratchanska (born 1965), composer and director in Luxembourg, one of her most famous works is "Gladius"
- Anna-Maria Ravnopolska-Dean (born 1960), composer, harpist, pedagogue
- Petko Staynov (1896–1977), a founding member and first chairman of the Bulgarian Contemporary Music Society (1933), which later became the Union of Bulgarian Composers
- Veselin Stoyanov (1902–1969), composer of classical music including two symphonies
- Emil Tabakov (born 1947), composer of symphonies and concertos
- Dobrinka Tabakova (born 1980), composer
- Julia Tsenova (1948–2010), contemporary composer, pianist, jazz pedagogue
- Georgi Tutev (1924–1994), composer of contemporary classical music, one of the main representatives of Bulgarian modernism
- Pancho Vladigerov (1899–1978), a founding member of the Bulgarian Contemporary Music Society (1933)

== Canada ==
- Airat Ichmouratov (1973), composer, pedagogue, conductor, klezmer clarinetist

== Chile ==
- Jaime González (born 1956), composer and music educator
- Víctor Jara (1932–1973), composer, pedagogue, theatre director, poet, singer-songwriter, and political activist
- Juan Orrego-Salas (1919–2019)
- Jorge Urrutia (1905–1981), composer, influenced by Claude Debussy and Maurice Ravel

== China ==
- Du Mingxin (born 1928), composer who collaborated on the ballet Red Detachment of Women
- Nie Er (1912–1935), wrote March of the Volunteers, the national anthem of the People's Republic of China
- Qu Xiao-Song (born 1952), composer, student of Du Mingxin
- Xian Xinghai (1905–1945), composer known for the Yellow River Cantata, a patriotic song during the Second Sino-Japanese War
- Xiao Shuxian (1905–1991), composer who blended elements of Chinese folk culture with Western techniques in her music

== Colombia ==
- Jacqueline Nova (1935–1975), pioneer on experimental music and Colombian feminist movement.

== Croatia ==
- Andrea Antico (c. 1480–1538)
- Krešimir Baranović (1894–1975)
- Blagoje Bersa (1873–1934)
- Bruno Bjelinski (1909–1992)
- Rudolf Brucci (1917–2002)
- Arsen Dedić (1938–2015)
- Dubravko Detoni (born 1937)
- Jakov Gotovac (1895–1982)
- Josip Hatze (1879–1959)
- Žiga Hirschler (1894–1941)
- Đelo Jusić (1939–2019)
- Alfi Kabiljo (born 1935)
- Milko Kelemen (1924–2018), contemporary composer
- Ivana Kiš (born 1979)
- Franjo Krežma (1862–1881)
- Igor Kuljerić (1938–2006)
- Ivana Lang (Zagreb, 1912 – Zagreb, 1982), composer, pianist and piano teacher.
- Vatroslav Lisinski (1819–1854), 19th-century composer and co–founder of "Illyrian Movement"
- Ferdo Livadić (1799–1879)
- Nada Ludvig-Pečar (1929–2008)
- Ivan Lukačić (1584–1648), renaissance composer
- Josip Mandić (1883–1959)
- Ivan Matetić Ronjgov (1880–1960)
- Boris Papandopulo (1914–1986), 20th-century composer
- Dora Pejačević (1885–1923), late-romantic composer
- Dragan Plamenac (1895–1983)
- Elena Pucić-Sorkočević (1786–1865)
- Vjekoslav Rosenberg-Ružić (1870–1954)
- Marko Rothmüller (1908–1993)
- Josif Runjanin (1821–1878)
- Milan Sachs (1884–1968)
- Antun Sorkočević (1775–1841)
- Luka Sorkočević (1734–1789)
- Josip Štolcer-Slavenski (1896–1955)
- Stjepan Šulek (1906–1991), 20th-century composer
- Ivo Tijardović (1895–1976)
- Marko Tomasović (composer) (born 1976), 21st-century composer
- Marcel Tyberg (1893–1944), composer who lived in Abbazia (formerly in Italy), now called Opatija, Croatia
- Albe Vidaković (1914–1964)
- Ivan Zajc (1832–1914)

== Cuba ==
- Hilario González (1920-1999)

== Cyprus ==
- Nicolas Economou (1953–1993), composer and conductor

== Czech Republic ==
- Antonín Dvořák (1841–1904)
- Heinrich Wilhelm Ernst (1812–1865)

== Denmark ==
- Niels Gade (1817–1890)
- Carl Nielsen (1865–1931)

== Dominican Republic ==
- Luis Alberti (1906–1976) composer of Merengue music
- Charytín (born 1949), significant 1970s pop music composer
- Juan Luis Guerra (born 1957) significant contemporary merengue and pop ballad composer
- Johnny Pacheco (born 1935) composer of Salsa music
- Anthony Santos (born 1981) significant bachata composer
- Sandra Zaiter (born 1943) significant children's songs composer

== Ecuador ==
- Mesías Maiguashca (born 1938)

== Egypt ==
- Sayed Darwish (1892–1923)
- Mohamed El Qasabgi (1892–1966)
- Zakariya Ahmad (1896–1961)
- Mohammed Abdel Wahab (1901–1991)
- Riad Al Sunbati (1906–1981)

== Estonia ==
- Arvo Pärt (born 1935)

== Finland ==
- Kalevi Aho (born 1949)
- Erik Bergman (1911–2006)
- Kaj Chydenius (born 1939)
- Bernhard Henrik Crusell (1775–1838)
- Henrik Otto Donner (1939–2013)
- Einar Englund (1916–1999)
- Paavo Heininen (1938–2022)
- Eero Hämeenniemi (born 1951)
- Armas Järnefelt (1869–1958)
- Jouni Kaipainen (1956–2015)
- Robert Kajanus (1856–1933)
- Yrjö Kilpinen (1892–1959)
- Uuno Klami (1900–1961)
- Joonas Kokkonen (1921–1996)
- Olli Kortekangas (born 1955)
- Toivo Kuula (1883–1918)
- Ilkka Kuusisto (1933–2025)
- Armas Launis (1884–1959)
- Helvi Leiviskä (1902–1982)
- Magnus Lindberg (born 1958)
- Leevi Madetoja (1887–1947)
- Tauno Marttinen (1912–2008)
- Erkki Melartin (1875–1937)
- Aarre Merikanto (1893–1958)
- Oskar Merikanto (1868–1924)
- Usko Meriläinen (1930–2004)
- Pehr Henrik Nordgren (1944–2008)
- Fredrik Pacius (1809–1891), moved to Finland at the age of 25, composer of Finnish national anthem
- Selim Palmgren (1878–1951)
- Jorma Panula (born 1930)
- Ernest Pingoud (1887–1942), born in St. Petersburg
- Tauno Pylkkänen (1918–1980)
- Väinö Raitio (1891–1945)
- Einojuhani Rautavaara (1928–2016)
- Kaija Saariaho (born 1952)
- Aulis Sallinen (born 1935)
- Erkki Salmenhaara (1941–2002)
- Esa-Pekka Salonen (born 1958)
- Leif Segerstam (1944-2024)
- Jean Sibelius (1865–1957), significant Finnish nationalist composer
- Jukka Tiensuu (born 1948)
- Erik Tulindberg (1761–1814)
- Martin Wegelius (1846–1906)
- Lotta Wennäkoski (born 1970)

== France ==
- Yann Pierre Tiersen (23 June 1970-present)

== Greece ==
- Jani Christou (1926–1970)
- Manos Hatzidakis (1925–1994)
- Manolis Kalomiris (1883–1962), classical composer. He was the founder of the Greek National School of Music.
- Stefanos Korkolis (born 1960)
- Nikolaos Lavdas (1879–1940)
- Nikolaos Mantzaros (1795–1872), composer of the Greek national anthem
- Yannis Markopoulos (born 1939)
- Thanos Mikroutsikos (1947–2019)
- Mimis Plessas (1924–2024)
- Nikos Skalkottas (1904–1945), member of the Second Viennese School
- Giannis Spanos (1934–2019)
- Mikis Theodorakis (1925–2021)
- Stavros Xarchakos (born 1939)
- Iannis Xenakis (1922–2001)
- Manos Loizos (1937–1982)
- Evangelos Odysseas Papathanassiou Vangelis (1943–2022)
- Eleni Karaindrou (1941-present)

== Guatemala ==
- Ricardo Arjona (born 1964), modern pop composer

== Haiti ==
- Nemours Jean-Baptiste (1918–1985) saxophonist, writer, composer and band leader of Conjunto International. He is credited with being the inventor of compas.
- Othello Bayard (1885–1971) musician, violinist, poet, and composer. Known for the patriotic song "Haïti Chérie".
- Carmen Brouard (1909–2005) pianist, composer and music educator.
- Frantz Casseus (1915–1993), guitarist and composer
- Issa El-Saieh (1919–2005), saxophonist, clarinetist, bandleader, composer, arranger, businessman, gallerist and art collector.
- Justin Elie (1883–1931), composer and pianist
- Nicolas Geffrard (1871–1930), musician and composer, best known for "La Dessalinienne", the Haitian national anthem.
- Alphonse Henriquez (1879–1955), composer.
- Lee Holdridge (born 1944), composer, conductor, and orchestrator
- Werner Jaegerhuber (1900–1953), composer.
- Occide Jeanty (1860–1936), composer, trumpeter, pianist and music director.
- Ludovic Lamothe (1882–1953), composer and virtuoso pianist.
- Lina Mathon-Blanchet (1903–1994), pianist, music teacher and composer.
- Michel Mauléart Monton (1855–1898), musician, pianist and composer. famous for the méringue classic, choucoune
- Widens Pkolo Dorsainville (born 1987), producer, actor and composer.
- Webert Sicot (1930–1985), saxophone player, composer and band leader. He is credited with being the inventor of Cadence rampa.
- Jean Bélony Murat (born 1979), composer and guitarist.
- Jean Jacques Clark Parent (Born 1951), writer, poet, composer, singer, playwright, novelist, and philosopher.

== Hungary ==
- Béla Bartók (1881–1945), 20th-century composer, considered one of the founders of ethnomusicology
- Gábor Darvas (1911–1985), composer and musicologist
- Ernő Dohnányi (1877–1960), 20th-century composer, Variations on a Nursery Tune, Suite in F-sharp minor, Ruralia Hungarica
- Péter Eötvös (born 1944)
- Karl Goldmark (1830–1915), Romantic composer influenced by Richard Wagner
- Stephen Heller (1813–1888), Early Romantic composer and pianist
- Joseph Joachim (1831–1907)
- Zoltán Kodály (1882–1967), 20th-century composer and ethnomusicologist
- Rezső Kókai (1906–1962), composer and musicologist
- György Kurtág (born 1926), 20th-century composer
- Franz Lehár (1870–1948), 20th-century composer most known for The Merry Widow
- György Sándor Ligeti (1923–2006), 20th-century composer best known for the various pieces featured in the Stanley Kubrick films 2001: A Space Odyssey, The Shining, and Eyes Wide Shut
- Franz Liszt (1811–1886), Romantic composer-pianist, wrote a number of tone poems and extended piano technique
- Ervin Nyiregyházi (1903–1987), romantic composer-pianist
- Miklós Rózsa (1907–1995), 20th-century composer, best known for his film music
- Tibor Szemző (born 1955), composer, performer and media artist
- Leo Weiner (1885–1960), 20th-century composer of the "Fox Dance"

== India ==
- M. Balamuralikrishna (1930–2016), carnatic music
- Clarence Barlow (1945–2023), contemporary art music
- Sandeep Bhagwati (born 1963), contemporary art music
- R.D. Burman (1939–1994), film composer, musician and singer
- Sachin Dev Burman (1906–1975), music composers for Hindi movies and a Bengali singer and composer
- Pritam Chakraborty (born 1971), film composer
- Salil Chowdhury (1922–1995), film music composer, western classical and folk fusion music writer and arranger
- Ilaiyaraja (born 1943), film composer, record producer, musician and singer
- Jatin–Lalit, music composer duo
- Khayyam (1927–2019), film composer
- Shirish Korde (born 1945), contemporary art music
- Bappi Lahiri (born 1952), film composer
- Laxmikant–Pyarelal, film composer duo
- Madan Mohan (born 1981), film composer, musician and singer
- Nadeem-Shravan, film composer duo
- Naushad (1919–2006), film composer
- O.P. Nayyar (1926–2007), film composer
- A. R. Rahman (born 1966 as Dilip), film composer, record producer, musician and singer
- Harris Jayaraj (born 8 July 1975), Indian film composer
- Yuvan Shankar Raja (born 1979), singer-songwriter, film score, and soundtrack composer
- Santhosh Narayanan (born 1983), Indian film composer
- Sean Roldan (born 1987), Indian musician
- Darbuka Siva (born 1982), Indian musician, director and actor
- Armaan Malik (born 1995), Indian composer, singer and songwriter
- Amaal Malik (born 1990), Indian composer, singer and songwriter
- Vivek-Mervin, Indian film composer duo
- Ravi (1926–2012), film composer
- Anirudh Ravichander (born 1990), singer, music director, film composer
- Shankar–Ehsaan–Loy trio of record producers, musicians, multi-instrumentalists
- Shankar Jaikishan, music composer duo
- Naresh Sohal (1939–2018), contemporary art music
- Amit Trivedi (born 1979), film composer
- Param Vir (born 1952), contemporary art music

== Indonesia ==
- Otto Sidharta (born 1955), music composer
- Ananda Sukarlan (born 1968)

== Italy ==
- Alessandro Alessandroni (1925–2017)
- Antonello da Caserta (fl. late 14th – early 15th centuries)
- Antonio Bazzini (1818–1897)
- Vincenzo Bellini (1801–1835)
- Luciano Berio (1925–2003)
- Luigi Boccherini (1743–1805)
- Giulio Cesare Brero (1908–1973)
- Paolo Buonvino (born 1968)
- Ferruccio Busoni (1886–1924)
- Alfredo Casella (1883–1947)
- Johannes Ciconia (c. 1370–1412)
- Francesco Cilea (1866–1950)
- Simone Cilio (born 1992)
- Stelvio Cipriani (1937–2018)
- Arcangelo Corelli (1653–1713)
- Gaetano Donizetti (1797–1848)
- Pino Donaggio (born 1941)
- Baldassare Galuppi (1706–1785)
- Gherardello da Firenze (c. 1320 – 1362 or 1363)
- Andrea Guerra (born 1961)
- Jacopo da Bologna (fl. 1340 – c. 1386)
- Francesco Landini (died 1397)
- Bruno Maderna (1920–1973)
- Marchetto da Padova (fl. 1305–1319)
- Dario Marianelli (born 1963)
- Pietro Mascagni (1863–1945)
- Claudio Monteverdi (1567–1643)
- Ennio Morricone (1928–2020)
- Luigi Nono (1924–1990)
- Niccolò Paganini (1782–1840)
- Giovanni Pierluigi da Palestrina (c. 1525–1594)
- Nicola Piovani (born 1946)
- Amilcare Ponchielli (1834–1886)
- Giacomo Puccini (1858–1924)
- Ottorino Respighi (1879–1936)
- Gioacchino Rossini (1792–1868)
- Alessandro Scarlatti (1660–1725)
- Domenico Scarlatti (1685–1757)
- Kristian Sensini (born 1976)
- Giuseppe Tartini (1692–1770)
- Giuseppe Torelli (1658–1709)
- Francesco Maria Veracini (1690–1768)
- Giuseppe Verdi (1813–1901)
- Giovanni Battista Viotti (1755–1824)
- Antonio Vivaldi (1678–1741)

== Latvia ==
- Pēteris Barisons (1904–1947)
- Kārlis Baumanis (1835–1905)
- Ilona Breģe (born 1959)
- Jānis Cimze (1814–1881)
- Emīls Dārziņš (1875–1910)
- Volfgangs Dārziņš (1906–1962)
- Rihards Dubra (born 1964)
- Maija Einfelde (born 1939)
- Ēriks Ešenvalds (born 1977)
- Lūcija Garūta (1902–1977)
- Jānis Ivanovs (1906–1983)
- Alberts Jērums (1919–1978)
- Andrejs Jurjāns (1856–1922)
- Alfrēds Kalniņš (1879–1951)
- Romualds Kalsons (born 1936)
- Arturs Maskats (born 1957)
- Jānis Mediņš (1890–1966)
- Emilis Melngailis (1974–1954)
- Georgs Pelēcis (born 1947)
- Pēteris Plakidis (1947–2017)
- Uģis Prauliņš (born 1957)
- Santa Ratniece (born 1977)
- Lolita Ritmanis (born 1962)
- Ādolfs Skulte (1909–2000)
- Pēteris Vasks (born 1946)
- Ernests Vīgners (1850–1933)
- Jāzeps Vītols (1863–1948)
- Marģeris Zariņš (1910–1993)
- Imants Zemzaris (born 1951)

== Liechtenstein ==
- Josef Rheinberger (1839–1901)

== Luxembourg ==
- Jean-Marie Kieffer (born 1960)

== North Macedonia ==
- Dimitrije Bužarovski (born 1952)
- Todor Skalovski (1909–2004)

== Madagascar ==
- Raymond Razafimbahiny (1919–1963)

== Malta ==
- Charles Camilleri (1931–2009), 20th century classical composer
- Carmelo Pace (1906–1993), music teacher and composer
- Robert Samut (1869–1934), composer of Malta's National Anthem, l-Innu Malti

== Mexico ==
- Miguel Bernal Jiménez (1910–1956), 20th Century composer
- Julián Carrillo (1875–1965), discovered the 13th sound
- Ricardo Castro (1864–1907), composer and pianist
- Daniel Catán (1949–2011), composer of operas
- Carlos Chávez (1899–1978), 20th-century classical composer and conductor
- Jose Mariano Elizaga (1786–1842), composer and theoretician
- Manuel Enriquez (1926–1994), modern classical composer
- Julio Estrada (born 1943), composer and theoretician
- Blas Galindo (1910–1993), 20th-century composer
- María Grever (1884–1951), composer of romantic songs like "Júrame"
- Carlos Jiménez Mabarak (1916–1994), 20th century composer
- Agustin Lara (1897–1970), composer of romantic songs like Maria Bonita, Solamente una Vez, Granada, etc.
- Mario Lavista (born 1943), composer and writer
- Francisco López Capillas (1608–1674), composer of the Baroque
- Armando Manzanero (1935–2020), singer, pianist and composer of Boleros
- Arturo Márquez (born 1950), wrote Danzón No. 2
- José Pablo Moncayo (1912–1958), composer of "Huapango"
- Melesio Morales (1839–1908), composer of the opera Ildegonda
- Conlon Nancarrow (1912–1997), wrote for player piano
- Manuel María Ponce (1882–1948), 20th-century composer
- Silvestre Revueltas (1899–1940), 20th-century classical composer of Sensemayá
- Juventino Rosas (1868–1894), composer of vals "Sobre las olas"
- Manuel de Sumaya (1678–1755), composer of the Baroque
- Eugenio Toussaint (1954–2011), contemporary jazz and classical composer
- Consuelo Velázquez (1924–2005), wrote the song "Bésame Mucho"

== Netherlands ==
- Michel van der Aa (born 1970), modern classical composer
- Hendrik Andriessen (1892–1981), classical composer of symphonies, songs and organworks
- Louis Andriessen (1939–2021), modern classical composer
- Henk Badings (1907–1987), classical composer of symphonic works, songs, electro-acoustical works
- Henriëtte Bosmans (1895–1952), classical composer of instrumental music and songs
- Jan Brandts Buys (1868–1933), composer of operas and chamber music
- Johannes van Bree (1801–1857), classical composer of symphonies, orchestral works, operas, songs, chamber music
- Lex van Delden (1919–1988), modern classical composer (symphonies, vocal music)
- Bernard van Dieren (1887–1936), composer of chamber music, symphonies, vocal works
- Cornelis Dopper (1870–1939), classical composer of symphonies, operas, concertos
- Rudolf Escher (1912–1980), classical composer of songs, symphonies, chamber music
- Carel Anton Fodor (1768–1846), classical composer of symphonies, concertos
- Jan van Gilse (1881–1944), classical composer of operas, symphonies, chamber music
- Pieter Hellendaal (1721–1799), classical composer of concerti grossi, chamber music, psalms and oratorios
- Elisabeth Kuyper (1877–1953), classical composer of orchestral works, concertos, chamber music, choral music, and songs
- Guillaume Landré (1905–1968), classical composer of vocal music, operas and symphonies
- Samuel de Lange (1840–1911), classical composer of operas, organ music, symphonic works, chamber music
- Fred Momotenko (born 1970), classical composer
- Leon Orthel (1905–1885), classical composer of symphonies and chamber music
- Willem Pijper (1894–1947), classical composer of chamber music, songs, symphonic works
- Julius Röntgen (1855–1932), classical composer of symphonies, concertos, chamber music, vocal works
- Leo Smit (1900–1943), classical composer of chamber music, songs, symphonic music
- Johannes Verhulst (1816–1891), classical composer of vocal music, symphonic works
- Matthijs Vermeulen (1888–1967), classical composer of symphonies and songs
- Alexander Voormolen (1895–1980), classical composer of chamber music, piano music and orchestral works
- Bernard Zweers (1854–1924), classical composer of vocal music, orchestral works and symphonies

== New Zealand ==
- Gillian Bibby (born 1945)
- Jack Body (1944–2015)
- Ivan Bootham (1939–2016)
- Helen Bowater (born 1952)
- Dorothy Buchanan (born 1945)
- Edwin Carr (1926–2003), 20th century classical
- Lyell Cresswell (born 1944), 20th century classical
- Eve de Castro-Robinson (born 1956)
- Gareth Farr (born 1968)
- Sir Dean Goffin (1918–1984), brass band composer
- Peter Hobbs (born 1970)
- Fanny Howie (1868–1916), composer of "Hine E Hine"
- Mihi-ki-te-kapua (?–c. 1872), composer of waiata
- Douglas Lilburn (1915–2001)
- Andrew Perkins (born 1961)
- Robert J. Pope (1865–1949), songwriter
- John Psathas (born 1966), 20th century classical
- Rihi Puhiwahine Te Rangi-hirawea (?–1906), composer of waiata
- John Rimmer (born 1939)
- Anthony Ritchie (born 1960), 20th century classical
- Stephen Roche (born 1964), composer of film music
- Michael Smither (born 1939)
- Sir William Southgate (born 1941)
- Ronald Tremain (1923–1998), 20th century classical
- Peter van der Fluit (born 1963)
- Gillian Karawe Whitehead (born 1941)
- Michael Williams (born 1962), 20th century classical
- Kenneth Young (born 1955)
- Wayan Yudane, composer of Balinese music

== Nigeria ==
- Joshua Uzoigwe (1946–2005), 20th century classical and Nigerian folk composer

== Norway ==
- Torstein Aagaard-Nilsen (born 1964), composer
- Valter Aamodt (1902–1989), Norwegian composer and music critic
- Ole Bornemann Bull (1810–1880) was a Norwegian violinist and composer, wrote The Herdgirl's Sunday
- Edvard Grieg (1843–1907), Romantic composer, known for his incidental music for Peer Gynt and his Piano Concerto
- Agathe Backer Grøndahl (1847–1907), Romantic composer and pianist, contemporary of Edvard Grieg
- Kjell Habbestad (born 1955), Norwegian composer
- Johan Halvorsen (1864–1935), Norwegian composer, famous for Entry March of the Boyars and Passacaglia in G minor on a Theme by George Frideric Handel
- Hans Fredrik Jacobsen (born 1954)
- Ståle Kleiberg (born 1958), classical composer and musicologist
- Herman Severin Løvenskiold (1815–1870), Romantic composer who wrote the score for the ballet La Sylphide
- Jan Erik Mikalsen (born 1979)
- Finn Mortensen (1922–1983), Norwegian composer, famous for bringing serialism and twelve-tone music to Norway
- Arne Nordheim (1931–2010), Norwegian composer, famous for bringing the modernism and electro acoustic music to Norway. Wrote Epitaffio for orchestra and tape, the ballet The Storm and Solitaire
- Marcus Paus (born 1979), Norwegian composer who writes tonal contemporary music and who has been described as a lyrical modernist
- Christian Sinding (1856–1941), Norwegian composer, wrote Rustle of Spring and the Suite for Violin and Orchestra
- Johan Svendsen (1840–1911), Norwegian composer of the Romance for Violin and Orchestra and 2 Symphonies
- Olav Anton Thommessen (born 1946), Norwegian composer, famous for "A Glass Bead Game"
- Lasse Thoresen (born 1949)
- Geirr Tveitt (1908–1981)
- Fartein Valen (1887–1952), Norwegian composer writing atonal polyphonic music. Famous for Le Cimetère Marin and the Violin Concerto

== Pakistan ==
- Nisar Bazmi (1924–2007)

== Peru ==
- Jaime Delgado Aparicio (1943–1983), contemporary jazz, pop and film score composer
- Jose Bernardo Alcedo (1788–1878), 19th-century Peruvian romantic composer, wrote the Peruvian National Anthem
- Daniel Alomía Robles (1871–1942), romantic composer, wrote El Cóndor Pasa
- Sadiel Cuentas (born 1973), contemporary composer
- Francisco González Gamarra (1890–1972), composer and painter
- Chabuca Granda (1920–1983), singer, contemporary and folk music composer
- Rafael Leonardo Junchaya (born 1965), contemporary composer
- Celso Garrido Lecca (1926–2025), contemporary composer
- Jimmy Lopez (born 1978), contemporary composer
- Clara Petrozzi (born 1965), contemporary composer
- Felipe Pinglo Alva (1899–1936), poet and songwriter, father of Música criolla
- Jorge Villavicencio Grossmann (born 1973), contemporary composer

== Poland ==
- Grażyna Bacewicz (1909–1969)
- Tekla Bądarzewska-Baranowska (1834–1861)
- Tadeusz Baird (1928–1981)
- Cyprian Bazylik (c.1535-c. 1600)
- Bazyli Bohdanowicz (1740–1817)
- Joanna Bruzdowicz (born 1943)
- Diomedes Cato (c. 1570-c. 1603)
- Frédéric Chopin (1810–1849), Romantic era composer known for single piano pieces
- Nicolaus Cracoviensis (1st half of the 16th century)
- Wojciech Długoraj (1557–1619)
- Ignacy Feliks Dobrzyński (1807–1867)
- Józef Ksawery Elsner (1769–1854)
- Sebastian z Felsztyna (c. 1480/1490-after 1543)
- Julian Fontana (1810–1869)
- Kasia Glowicka (born 1977)
- Leopold Godowsky (1870–1938)
- Mikołaj Gomółka (1535–1591)
- Grzegorz Gerwazy Gorczycki (1665/67–1734)
- Henryk Górecki (1933–2010)
- Konstanty Gorski (1859–1924)
- Adam Jarzębski (c. 1590–1649)
- Jan A. P. Kaczmarek (born 1953)
- Bronisław Kaper (1902–1983)
- Zbigniew Karkowski (1958–2013)
- Mieczysław Karłowicz (1876–1909)
- Wojciech Kilar (1932–2013)
- Stefan Kisielewski (1911–1991)
- Krzysztof Klabon (c. 1550-after 1616)
- Sebastian Klonowic (c. 1545–1602)
- Józef Koffler (1896–1944)
- Krzysztof Komeda (1931–1969)
- Zygmunt Konieczny (born 1937)
- Włodzimierz Kotoński (1925–2014)
- Zygmunt Krauze (born 1938)
- Hanna Kulenty (born 1961)
- Karol Kurpiński (1785–1857)
- Simon Laks (1901–1983)
- Marcin Leopolita (c. 1540-c.1589)
- Franciszek Lessel (1780–1838)
- Franciszek Lilius (c. 1600 – 1657)
- Karol Lipiński (1790–1861)
- Jan z Lublina (late 15th century–1540)
- Paweł Łukaszewski (born 1968)
- Witold Lutosławski (1913–1994)
- Roman Maciejewski (1910–1998)
- Krzysztof Meyer (born 1943)
- Marcin Mielczewski (1600–1651)
- Franciszek Mirecki (1791–1862)
- Emil Młynarski (1870–1935)
- Stanisław Moniuszko (1819–1872)
- Maurycy Moszkowski (1854–1925)
- Krystyna Moszumańska-Nazar (1924–2009)
- Paweł Mykietyn (born 1971)
- Zygmunt Noskowski (1846–1909)
- Feliks Nowowiejski (1877–1946)
- Michał Kazimierz Ogiński (1728–1800)
- Michał Kleofas Ogiński (1765–1833)
- Edward Olearczyk (1915–1994)
- Ignacy Jan Paderewski (1864–1941)
- Roman Palester (1907–1989)
- Andrzej Panufnik (1914–1991)
- Bartłomiej Pękiel (died 1670)
- Krzysztof Penderecki (1933–2020)
- Jakub Polak (1540–1605)
- Zbigniew Preisner (born 1955)
- Grażyna Pstrokońska-Nawratil (born 1947)
- Marta Ptaszyńska (born 1943)
- Jacek Różycki (1625/35–1703/04)
- Ludomir Różycki (1884–1953)
- Witold Rudziński (1913–2004)
- Marian Sawa (1937–2005)
- Bogusław Schaeffer (1929–2019)
- Franciszek Ścigalski (1782–1846)
- Kazimierz Serocki (1922–1981)
- Andrzej Siewiński (died by 1726)
- Elżbieta Sikora (born 1943)
- Marek Stachowski (1936–2004)
- Roman Statkowski (1859–1925)
- Zygmunt Denis Antoni Jordan de Stojowski (1870–1946)
- Bolesław Szabelski (1896–1979)
- Wacław z Szamotuł (c. 1526–1560)
- Stanisław Sylwester Szarzyński (prob. 2nd half of the 17th century)
- Aleksander Szeligowski (1934–1963)
- Tadeusz Szeligowski (1896–1963)
- Władysław Szpilman (1911–2000)
- Maria Szymanowska (1789–1831)
- Karol Szymanowski (1882–1937)
- Paweł Szymański (born 1954)
- Alexandre Tansman (1897–1986)
- André Tchaikowsky (1935–1982)
- Zbigniew Turski (1908–1979)
- Mieczysław Weinberg (1919–1996)
- Henryk Wieniawski (1835–1880)
- Kazimierz Wiłkomirski (1900–1995)
- Juliusz Zarębski (1854–1885)
- Władysław Żeleński (1837–1921)
- Maciej Zieliński (born 1971)
- Mikołaj Zieleński (1st half of the 17th century)

== Portugal ==
- Alfredo Keil (1850–1907)
- Jaime Reis (born 1983)

== Puerto Rico ==
- Juan F. Acosta (1890–1968)
- Esther Alejandro de León (born 1947)
- Mercedes Arias (c. 1860–1930)
- Rafael Alers (1903–1978)
- Julio Alvarado Tricoche (1886–1970)
- Miguel Angel Amadeo
- Roberto Angleró (1929–2018)
- Henry Arana (1921–2008)
- Julio C. Arteaga (1867–1923)
- Julio Bagué (born 1968)
- Samuel Beníquez (born 1971)
- Obie Bermúdez (born 1981)
- Americo Boschetti (born 1951)
- Lou Briel (born 1954)
- Roy Brown (born 1945)
- Antonio Cabán Vale (born 1942)
- Nano Cabrera
- Héctor Campos Parsi (1922–1998)
- Bobby Capó (1922–1989)
- Vicente Carattini (1939–2005)
- Andrés Castro Ríos (1942–2006)
- Arístides Chavier Arévalo (1867–1942)
- Edwin Colón Zayas (born 1965)
- Ernesto Cordero (born 1946)
- Federico A. Cordero (1928–2012)
- Tony Croatto (1940–2005)
- Bobby Cruz (born 1937)
- Tite Curet Alonso (1926–2003)
- Braulio Dueño Colón (1854–1934)
- Johnathan Dwayne (born 1963)
- Rafi Escudero (born 1945)
- Noel Estrada (1918–1979)
- Cheo Feliciano (1935–2014)
- José Feliciano (born 1945)
- Manuel Fernández Juncos (1846–1928)
- Pedro Flores (1894–1979)
- Luis Fonsi (born 1978)
- Kany García (born 1982)
- Gloria González (born 1944)
- Rafael Hernández Marín (1892–1965)
- Harold Hopkins Miranda (born 1971)
- Gustavo Laureano (born 1970)
- Raphy Leavitt (1948–2015)
- Víctor Manuelle (born 1968)
- Ladislao Martínez (1898–1979)
- Ismael Miranda (born 1950)
- Ángel Mislan (1862–1911)
- Glenn Monroig (born 1957)
- Juan Morel Campos (1857–1896)
- Angélica Negrón (born 1981)
- Noelia (born 1979)
- José Nogueras (born 1951)
- William Ortiz-Alvarado (born 1947)
- Luis "Perico" Ortiz (born 1949)
- Olimpio Otero Vergés (1845–1911)
- José Enrique Pedreira (1904–1959)
- Ángel Peña (born 1948)
- Pijuán (1942–2018)
- Miguel Poventud (1942–1983)
- Lourdes Pérez (born 1961)
- Ivy Queen (born 1972)
- Sylvia Rexach (1922–1961)
- Luciano Quiñones (born 1948)
- Ismael Quintana (1937–2016)
- José Ignacio Quintón (1881–1925)
- Chamaco Ramírez (1941–1983)
- Luis Antonio Ramírez (1923–1995)
- Juan Ríos Ovalle (1863–1928)
- Tomás Rivera Morales (1927–2001)
- Chamaco Rivera (born 1946)
- Ismael Rivera (1931–1987)
- Ramón Rivero (1909–1956)
- Augusto Rodríguez (1904–1993)
- Julito Rodríguez (1925–2013)
- Willie Rosario (born 1930)
- Herman Santiago (born 1941)
- Daniel Santos (1916–1992)
- Nino Segarra (born 1953)
- Roberto Sierra (born 1953)
- Arturo Somohano (1910–1977)
- Manuel Gregorio Tavárez (1843–1883)
- Yomo Toro (1933–2012)
- Raymond Torres-Santos (born 1958)
- Eladio Torres (born 1950)
- Rawy Torres (born 1975)
- Tommy Torres (born 1971)
- Juan Vélez (born 1983)
- Wilkins (born 1953)

== Romania ==
- Mihail Andricu (1894–1974)
- Pascal Bentoiu (1927–2016)
- Eduard Caudella (1841–1929)
- Adrian Enescu (1948–2016)
- George Enescu (1881–1955)
- Mihail Jora (1891–1971)
- Sorin Lerescu (born 1953)
- Dinu Lipatti (1917–1950)
- Tiberiu Olah (1921–2002)
- Ciprian Porumbescu (1853–1883)
- George Stephănescu (1843–1925)
- Aurel Stroe (1932–2008)
- Anatol Vieru (1926–1998)

== Russia ==
- Alexander Abramsky (1898–1985)
- Alexander Vasilyevich Alexandrov (1883–1946)
- Anatoly Nikolayevich Alexandrov (1888–1982)
- Boris Alexandrovich Alexandrov (1905–1994)
- Alexander Alyabyev (1787–1851)
- Iosif Andriasov (1933–2000)
- Anton Arensky (1861–1906)
- Alexander Arkhangelsky (1846–1924)
- Lera Auerbach (born 1973)
- Arseny Avraamov (1886–1944)
- Mily Balakirev (1837–1910)
- Maksim Berezovsky (c. 1745–1777)
- Matvey Blanter (1903–1990)
- Alexander Borodin (1833–1887)
- Dmitry Bortniansky (1751–1825)
- Yury G. Chernavsky (1947–2025)
- Pavel Chesnokov (1877–1944)
- Julius Conus (1869–1942)
- César Cui (1835–1918)
- Alexander Dargomyzhsky (1813–1869)
- Edison Denisov (1929–1996)
- Leonid Desyatnikov (born 1955)
- Nikolay Diletsky (c. 1630–after 1680)
- Irina Elcheva (1926–2013)
- Victor Ewald (1860–1935)
- Samuil Feinberg (1890–1962)
- Veniamin Fleishman (1913–1941)
- Yan Frenkel (1920–1989)
- Arthur Friedheim (1859–1932)
- Varvara Gaigerova (1903–1944)
- Alexander Glazunov (1865–1936)
- Reinhold Glière (1875–1956)
- Mikhail Glinka (1804–1857)
- Mikhail Gnesin (1883–1957)
- Alexander Goedicke (1877–1957)
- Nicolai Golovanov (1891–1953)
- Evgeny Golubev (1910–1988)
- Alexander Gretchaninov (1864–1956)
- Sofia Gubaidulina (born 1931)
- Alexander Ilyinsky (1859–1920)
- Mikhail Ippolitov-Ivanov (1859–1935)
- Dmitry Kabalevsky (1904–1987)
- Vasily Kalinnikov (1866–1901)
- Viktor Kalinnikov (1870–1927)
- Nikolai Kapustin (1937–2020)
- Nikolai Karetnikov (1930–1994)
- Yakov Kazyansky (born 1948)
- Aram Khachaturian (1903–1978)
- Karen Khachaturian (1920–2011)
- Ivan Khandoshkin (1747–1804)
- Yuri Khanon (born 1965)
- Tikhon Khrennikov (1913–2007)
- Alexander Knaifel (born 1943)
- Alexander Kopylov (1854–1911)
- Andrei Krylov (born 1961)
- Ivan Larionov (1830–1889)
- Ekaterina Likoshin (fl. 1800–1810)
- Aleksandr Lokshin (1920–1987)
- Arthur Lourié (1892–1966)
- Anatoly Lyadov (1855–1914)
- Sergei Lyapunov (1859–1924)
- Katerina Maier (fl. c. 1800)
- Nina Makarova (1908–1976)
- Vladimir Martynov (born 1946)
- Mikhail Matyushin (1861–1934)
- Samuel Maykapar (1867–1938)
- Nikolai Medtner (1880–1951)
- Fred Momotenko (born 1970), modern classical composer
- Alexander Mosolov (1900–1973)
- Modest Mussorgsky (1839–1881)
- Nikolai Myaskovsky (1881–1950)
- Vyacheslav Nagovitsin (born 1939)
- Tatiana Nikolayeva (1924–1993)
- Nikolai Obukhov (1899–1954)
- Vasily Pashkevich (c. 1742–1797)
- Boris Pasternak (1890–1960)
- Alla Pavlova (born 1952)
- Sergei Prokofiev (1891–1953)
- Sergei Rachmaninoff (1873–1943)
- Vladimir Rebikov (1866–1920)
- Nikolai Rimsky-Korsakov (1844–1908)
- Nikolai Roslavets (1881–1944)
- Anton Rubinstein (1829–1894)
- Leonid Sabaneyev (1881–1968)
- Adrian Schaposhnikov (1888–1967)
- Joseph Schillinger (1895–1943)
- Alfred Schnittke (1934–1998)
- Alexander Scriabin (1872–1915)
- Julian Scriabin (1908–1919)
- Vladimir Shainsky (1925–2017)
- Rodion Shchedrin (1932–2025)
- Vladimir Shcherbachov (1889–1952)
- Dmitri Shostakovich (1906–1975)
- Yekaterina Sinyavina (died 1784)
- Gregory Skovoroda (1722–1794)
- Nikolay Sokolov (1859–1922)
- Maximilian Steinberg (1883–1946)
- Igor Stravinsky (1882–1971)
- Georgy Sviridov (1915–1998)
- Alexander Taneyev (1850–1918)
- Sergei Taneyev (1856–1915)
- Boris Tchaikovsky (1925–1996)
- Pyotr Ilyich Tchaikovsky (1840–1893)
- Alexander Tcherepnin (1899–1977)
- Alexey Nikolayevich Titov (1769–1827)
- Vasily Polikarpovich Titov (c. 1650–c. 1715)
- Galina Ustvolskaya (1919–2006)
- Vladimir Vavilov (1925–1973)
- Artemy Vedel (c. 1767–1808)
- Alexander Veprik (1898–1958)
- Yuliya Veysberg (1878/1880–1942)
- Ivan Wyschnegradsky (1893–1979)
- Alexander Zhurbin (born 1945)
- Lev Zhurbin (born 1978)
- Marija Zubova (1749–1799)

== Serbia ==
- Isidor Bajić (1878–1915)
- Petar Bergamo (1930–2022)
- Stanislav Binički (1872–1942)
- Goran Bregović (born 1950)
- Dejan Despić (born 1930)
- Uroš Dojčinović (born 1959)
- Zoran Erić (born 1950)
- Dragutin Gostuški (1923–1998)
- Vladimir Graić (born 1968)
- Stevan Hristić (1885–1958)
- Jovo Ivanišević (1861–1889)
- Ion Ivanovici (1845–1902), Romanian composer of Serbian descent
- Aleksandar Kobac (born 1971)
- Marko Kon (born 1972)
- Petar Konjović (1883–1970)
- Kristina Kovač (born 1974)
- Petar Krstić (1877–1957)
- Luigi von Kunits (1870–1931), founder of both the Pittsburg and Toronto symphony orchestras
- Ljubica Marić (1909–2003)
- Josif Marinković (1851–1931), one of the most important Serbian composers of the 19th century
- Milan Mihajlović (born 1945)
- Miloje Milojević (1884–1946)
- Stevan Stojanović Mokranjac (1856–1914)
- Vasilije Mokranjac (1923–1984)
- Vojna Nešić (born 1947)
- Elena Pucić-Sorkočević (1786–1865) was the first female composer in the Republic of Ragusa (Republic of Dubrovnik)
- Miloš Raičković (born 1956)
- Rudolph Réti (1885–1957)
- Josip Runjanin (1821–1878), well-known Croatian and Serbian composer. Ethnic Serb
- Kornelije Stanković (1831–1865)
- Petar Stojanović (1877–1957)
- Josip Stolcer-Slavenski (1896–1955)
- Zoran Sztevanovity (born 1942)
- Marko Tajčević (1900–1984)
- Vladimir Tošić (born 1949)
- Dusan Trbojevic (1925–2011)
- Jasna Veličković (born 1974)
- Mihailo Vukdragović (1900–1967)

== South Korea ==
- Ahn Eak-tai (1906–1965)
- Junsang Bahk (born 1937)
- Unsuk Chin (born 1961)
- Insook Choi (born 1962)
- DaeSeob Han (born 1977)
- Sungji Hong (born 1973)
- Hyun Jae-Myung (1902–1960)
- Hi Kyung Kim (born 1954)
- Kim Jin-Hi (born 1957)
- Chan-Hae Lee (born 1945)
- Young-ja Lee (born 1931)
- Lim Jun-Hee (born 1959)
- Sook-Ja Oh (born 1941)
- Younghi Pagh-Paan (born 1945)
- Jeajoon Ryu (born 1970)
- Kyungsun Suh (born 1942)
- Yun I-sang (1917–1995)

== Spain ==
- Marcial del Adalid y Gurréa (1826–1881), composer
- Dionisio Aguado y García (1784–1849), composer and guitarist
- Sebastian Aguilera de Heredia (1561–1627), composer and organist
- Isaac Albéniz (1860–1909), late Romantic composer and pianist, wrote nationalist works such as Iberia
- Mateo Albéniz (1755–1831), composer
- Manuel Alejandro (born 1969), contemporary song composer
- Francisco Alonso (1887–1948), composer of zarzuela
- Vicente Amigo (born 1967), composer
- Juan de Anchieta (1462–1523), composer
- Juan Crisóstomo Arriaga (1806–1826), Romantic composer, nicknamed the "Spanish Mozart" before dying at age 19
- Emilio Arrieta (1821–1894), composer
- Salvador Bacarisse (1898–1963), composer
- Leonardo Balada (born 1933), composer, naturalized American
- Francisco Asenjo Barbieri (1823–1894), composer of zarzuela
- Sergio Blardony (born 1965), composer
- Tomás Bretón (1850–1923), composer
- Pablo Bruna (1611–1679), composer and organist
- Johannes Cornago (c. 1400–after 1475)
- Juan Bautista Cabanilles (1644–1712), composer and organist
- Antonio de Cabezón (1510–1566), composer and organist
- Ramón Carnicer (1841–1922), composer
- Narciso Casanovas (1747–1799), composer
- Ruperto Chapí (1851–1909), composer
- Federico Chueca (1846–1908), composer
- Gaspar Cassado (1897–1966), composer and cellist
- Juan J. Colomer (born 1966), composer
- Francisco Correa de Arauxo (1584–1654), composer and organist
- Sebastián Durón (1660–1716), composer
- Gustavo Díaz-Jerez (born 1970), composer
- Juan del Encina (1468–1529), composer
- Manuel de Falla (1876–1946), 20th-century composer, best known for The Three-Cornered Hat
- Mateo Flecha (1481–1553), composer
- Antón García Abril (1933–2021), composer
- Manuel García the Senior (1775–1832), also Manuel del Pópulo Vicente Rodriguez García
- Roberto Gerhard (1896–1970), composer
- Enrique Granados (1867–1916), nationalist composer and pianist, influenced later composers such as Manuel de Falla
- Isabel Güell i López (1872-1956), composer, pianist, organist
- Francisco Guerrero (1528–1599), composer
- Jesús Guridi (1886–1961), composer
- Cristóbal Halffter (1930–2021), composer and conductor
- Ernesto Halffter (1905–1989), composer
- Rodolfo Halffter (1900–1987), composer
- Luis Venegas de Henestrosa (c. 1510–1570)
- Juan Hidalgo de Polanco (1614–1685), composer and harpist
- Joaquin Homs (1906–2006), composer
- Sebastián Iradier (1809–1865), composer
- Andrés Isasi (1890–1940), composer
- Ricard Lamote de Grignon (1899–1965), composer
- Ramon Lazkano (born 1968), composer
- Antoni Lliteres Carrió (1673–1747), composer of zarzuela
- Miguel Llobet (1878–1938), guitarist and composer
- Alonso Lobo (1555–1617), composer
- Paco de Lucía (1947–2014), composer
- Pablo Luna (1879–1942), composer of zarzuela
- Josep Mestres Quadreny (1929–2021), composer
- Tomás Marco (born 1942), composer
- Luis de Milán (c. 1500–1561), composer and vihuelist
- Federico Mompou (1893–1987), composer
- Ramón Montoya (1880–1949), composer
- Xavier Montsalvatge (1912–2002), composer
- Cristóbal de Morales (1500–1553), composer
- Federico Moreno Torroba (1891–1982), composer
- Alonso Mudarra (1510–1580), composer
- Luis de Narváez (fl. 1526–1549), composer and vihuelist
- Pablo Nassarre (1650–1730), composer, organist, and theorist
- Jaime Nunó (1824–1908), composer
- Fernando Obradors (1897–1945), composer
- Gonzalo de Olavide (1934–2005), composer
- Diego Ortiz (1510–1570), composer and theorist
- Luis de Pablo (1930–2021), composer
- Felipe Pedrell (1841–1922), 19th-century composer
- Joan Baptista Pla (1720–1773), composer
- David del Puerto (born 1964), composer
- Joan Pau Pujol (1570–1626), composer
- Niño Ricardo (1904–1972), composer
- Joaquín Rodrigo (1901–1999), 20th-century composer, wrote the Concierto de Aranjuez for classical guitar and orchestra
- Antonio Rodríguez de Hita (1722–1787), composer
- Antonio Ruiz-Pipò (1934–1997), 20th-century composer for the guitar
- Sabicas (1912–1990), composer
- José María Sánchez-Verdú (born 1968), composer
- Manolo Sanlúcar (born 1943), composer
- Gaspar Sanz (1640–1710), Baroque era guitar composer
- Pablo de Sarasate (1844–1908), Romantic era virtuoso violinist and composer
- José Serrano (1873–1941), composer
- Juan Sesé y Balaguer (1736–1801), composer
- Antonio Soler (1729–1783), wrote sonatas and concertos for the harpsichord and organ
- Fernando Sor (1778–1839), Classical/Romantic era composer for the guitar
- Pablo Sorozábal (1897–1988), composer
- Francisco Tárrega (1852–1909), Romantic era guitarist and composer
- Eduardo Torres (1872–1934), Late Romantic composer of organ works and guitar pieces
- Joaquín Turina (1882–1949), composer of chamber music, piano works, guitar pieces, and songs
- Juan de Urrede (c. 1430–after 1482)
- José María Usandizaga (1887–1915)
- Manuel Valls (1920–1984), composer
- Joaquín Valverde Durán (1846–1910), composer of zarzuelas
- Joaquín "Quinito" Valverde Sanjuán (1875–1918), composer of zarzuelas
- Octavio Vazquez (born 1972), composer
- Tomás Luis de Victoria (1548–1611), composer
- Pedro Vilarroig (born 1954), contemporary neo-tonal composer.
- Sebastián de Vivanco (1551–1622), composer
- Amadeo Vives (1871–1932), composer
- Valentín Zubiaurre (1837–1914), composer

== Sri Lanka ==
Arul Sabesh (2025)

== Sweden ==
- Lars-Erik Larsson (1908–1986)
- Johan Helmich Roman (1694–1758)
- Dag Wirén (1905–1986)

== Switzerland ==
- Fritz Bovet (fl. 1845–1888), violinist, composed at least one string quartet (still in print), watchmaker, Swiss vice-counsel to Canton, China
- Caroline Charrière (1960–2018), composer, flautist, choir director
- Heinz Holliger (born 1939)
- Arthur Honegger (1892–1955)
- Frank Martin (1890–1974)
- Othmar Schoeck (1886–1957)
- Andreas Vollenweider (born 1953)

== Taiwan ==
- Tyzen Hsiao (1938–2015)
- Liu Shueh-Shuan 劉學軒 (born 1969), 21st century contemporary classical composer

== Turkey ==
- Ahmed Adnan Saygun (1907–1991)
- Ulvi Cemal Erkin (1906–1972)
- Cemal Reşit Rey (1904–1985)
- Hasan Ferit Alnar (1906–1978)
- Necil Kazım Akses (1908–1999)

== United Kingdom ==
- Malcolm Arnold (1921–2006)
- Ben Bartlett (1965–2026)
- Arnold Bax (1883–1953)
- Harrison Birtwistle (1934–2022)
- Arthur Bliss (1891–1975)
- John Blow (1649–1708)
- Frank Bridge (1879–1941)
- Benjamin Britten (1913–1976)
- William Byrd (1540–1623)
- Eric Coates (1886–1957)
- Peter Maxwell Davies (1934–2016)
- Frederick Delius (1862–1934)
- John Dowland (1563–1626)
- John Dunstable (c. 1390–1453)
- Edward Elgar (1857–1934)
- George Frideric Handel (1685–1759)
- Gustav Holst (1874–1934)
- Herbert Howells (1892–1983)
- John Ireland (1879–1962)
- Hubert Parry (1848–1918)
- Henry Purcell (1659–1695)
- Arthur Sullivan (1842–1900)
- Thomas Tallis (died 1585)
- Michael Tippett (1905–1998)
- Ralph Vaughan Williams (1872–1958)
- William Walton (1902–1983)

== United States ==
- Maurice Abrahams (1883–1931)
- Mark Adamo (born 1962)
- Alton Adams (1889–1987)
- John Adams (born 1947)
- John Luther Adams (born 1953)
- H. Leslie Adams (born 1932)
- Samuel Adler (born 1928)
- Bruce Adolphe (born 1955)
- Milton Adolphus (1913–1988)
- Miguel del Águila (born 1957)
- Stephen Albert (1941–1992)
- Mark Alburger (born 1957)
- Russell Alexander (1877–1915)
- Esther Allan (1914–1985)
- Tori Amos (born 1963)
- David Amram (born 1930)
- Trey Anastasio (born 1964)
- Beth Anderson (born 1950)
- Leroy Anderson (1908–1975)
- T. J. Anderson (born 1928)
- John Antes (1740–1811)
- George Antheil (1900–1959)
- Alfredo Antonini (1901–1983)
- Frederic Archer (1838–1901)
- Dominick Argento (1927–2019)
- Harold Arlen (1905–1986)
- Felix Arndt (1889–1918)
- Robert Ashley (1930–2014)
- May Aufderheide (1888–1972)
- Larry Austin (1930–2018)
- Frederick Ayres (1876–1926)
- Milton Babbitt (1916–2011)
- Burt Bacharach (1928–2023)
- Ernst Bacon (1898–1990)
- David Baker (1931–2016)
- Leonardo Balada (born 1933)
- Edward Ballantine (1886–1971)
- George Barati (1913–1996)
- Samuel Barber (1910–1981)
- Wayne Barlow (1912–1996)
- Matthew Barnson (born 1979)
- Marion Bauer (1882–1955)
- Amy Beach (1867–1944)
- Robert Beadell (1925–1994)
- Jeff Beal (born 1963)
- Robert Beaser (born 1954)
- Jeremy Beck (born 1960)
- Johann H. Beck (1856–1924)
- John J. Becker (1886–1961)
- Jack Beeson (1921–2010)
- Supply Belcher (1751–1836)
- Robert Russell Bennett (1894–1981)
- Arthur Berger (1912–2003)
- Jonathan Berger (born 1954)
- William Bergsma (1921–1994)
- Irving Berlin (1888–1989)
- Derek Bermel (born 1967)
- Elmer Bernstein (1922–2004)
- Leonard Bernstein (1918–1990)
- Philip Bezanson (1916–1975)
- Lisa Bielawa (born 1968)
- William Billings (1746–1800)
- Phillip Bimstein (born 1947)
- Seth Bingham (1882–1972)
- Arthur H. Bird (1856–1923)
- Easley Blackwood Jr. (born 1933)
- Eubie Blake (1883–1983)
- Marc Blitzstein (1905–1964)
- Ernest Bloch (1880–1959)
- Dušan Bogdanović (born 1955)
- William Bolcom (born 1938)
- Margaret Bonds (1913–1972)
- Francis Boott (1813–1904)
- David Borden (born 1938)
- Benjamin Boretz (born 1934)
- George Botsford (1874–1949)
- Roger Bourland (born 1952)
- Paul Bowles (1910–1999)
- Martin Boykan (1931–2021)
- Henry Brant (1913–2008)
- Joseph Carl Breil (1870–1926)
- Roger Briggs (born 1952)
- Kendall Durelle Briggs (born 1959)
- George Frederick Bristow (1825–1898)
- Howard Brockway (1870–1951)
- Earle Brown (1926–2002)
- Uzee Brown Jr (born 1950)
- William Brown (active 1780–1790)
- Dave Brubeck (1920–2012)
- Adolf Brune (1870–1935)
- George Brunner (born 1951)
- Mark Bucci (1924–2002)
- Dudley Buck (1839–1909)
- Harold Budd (1936–2020)
- Harry Burleigh (1866–1949)
- Howard J. Buss (born 1951)
- Curt Cacioppo (born 1951)
- Charles Wakefield Cadman (1881–1946)
- John Cage (1912–1992)
- David DeBoor Canfield (born 1950)
- John Carisi (1922–1992)
- Robert Carl (born 1954)
- David Carlson (born 1952)
- John Alden Carpenter (1876–1951)
- Benjamin Carr (1768–1831)
- Elliott Carter (1908–2012)
- Kristopher Carter (born 1972)
- Romeo Cascarino (1922–2002)
- George Whitefield Chadwick (1854–1931)
- Evan Chambers (born 1963)
- Eric Chasalow (born 1955)
- Rhys Chatham (born 1952)
- Chen Yi (born 1953)
- Paul Chihara (born 1938)
- F. Melius Christiansen (1871–1955)
- Paul J. Christiansen (1914–1997)
- Avery Claflin (1898–1979)
- Philip Greeley Clapp (1888–1954)
- René Clausen (born 1953)
- Gloria Coates (1938–2023)
- Louis Coerne (1870–1922)
- Robert Cogan (1930–2021)
- James Cohn (1928–2021)
- Dan Coleman (born 1972)
- Valerie Coleman (born 1970)
- Edward Joseph Collins (1886–1951)
- Laura Sedgwick Collins (1859–1927)
- Edward T. Cone (1917–2004)
- Zez Confrey (1895–1971)
- Sylvia Constantinidis (born 1962)
- David Conte (born 1955)
- Bill Conti (born 1942)
- Charles Crozat Converse (1832–1918)
- Frederick Converse (1871–1940)
- Will Marion Cook (1869–1944)
- Carson Cooman (born 1982)
- David Cope (born 1941)
- Aaron Copland (1900–1990)
- Carmine Coppola (1910–1991)
- Sidney Corbett (born 1960)
- John Corigliano (born 1938)
- Mildred Couper (1887–1974)
- Henry Cowell (1897–1965)
- Sibylla Bailey Crane (1851–1902)
- John Craton (born 1953)
- Ruth Crawford Seeger (1901–1953)
- Noah Creshevsky (1945–2020)
- Paul Creston (1906–1985)
- David Crumb (born 1962)
- George Crumb (1929–2022)
- Conrad Cummings (born 1948)
- Alvin Curran (born 1938)
- Sebastian Currier (born 1959)
- Hoyt Curtin (1922–2000)
- Walter Damrosch (1862–1950)
- Joseph Dangerfield (born 1977)
- Richard Danielpour (born 1956)
- Mabel Wheeler Daniels (1878–1971)
- Michael Daugherty (born 1954)
- Mario Davidovsky (1934–2019)
- Don Davis (born 1957)
- Katherine K. Davis (1892–1980)
- Reginald De Koven (1859–1920)
- Edmond Dédé (1827–1903)
- David Del Tredici (born 1937)
- Norman Dello Joio (1913–2008)
- Stuart Dempster (born 1936)
- James Di Pasquale (born 1941)
- Rocco Di Pietro (born 1949)
- David Diamond (1915–2005)
- Clarence Dickinson (1873–1969)
- Emma Lou Diemer (born 1927)
- Fannie Charles Dillon (1881–1947)
- Lawrence Dillon (born 1959)
- Charles Dodge (born 1942)
- Daniel Dorff (born 1956)
- Celius Dougherty (1902–1986)
- John Thomas Douglass (1847–1886)
- John W. Downey (1927–2004)
- Deborah Drattell (born 1956)
- Paul Dresher (born 1951)
- Jacob Druckman (1928–1996)
- William Duckworth (1943–2012)
- John Woods Duke (1899–1984)
- Vernon Duke (1903–1969)
- Dennis Eberhard (1943–2005)
- Clara Edwards (1880–1974)
- Cecil Effinger (1914–1990)
- Henry Eichheim (1870–1942)
- Danny Elfman (born 1953)
- Bradley Ellingboe (born 1958)
- Duke Ellington (1899–1974)
- Abraham Ellstein (1907–1963)
- Donald Erb (1927–2008)
- Robert Erickson (1917–1997)
- Pozzi Escot (born 1933)
- Alvin Etler (1913–1973)
- Ralph Evans (born 1953)
- Eric Ewazen (born 1954)
- Roopam Garg (born 1995)
- Ferde Grofé (1892–1972)

== Ukraine ==
- Arkady Abaza (1843–1915)
- Yevhen Adamtsevych (1904–1972)
- Hryhory Alchevsky (1866–1920)
- Mykola Arkas (1853–1909)
- Svitlana Azarova (born 1976)
- Virko Baley (born 1938)
- Lev Barenboim (1906–1985)
- Alexandre Barjansky (1883–1961)
- Vasyl Barvinsky (1888–1963)
- Yelizaveta Belogradskaya (1739– ?c. 1764)
- Maxim Berezovsky (c. 1745–1777)
- Oleksandr Bilash (1931–2003)
- Timofiy Bilohradsky (c. 1710 – c. 1782)
- Felix Blumenfeld (1863 –1931)
- Dmytro Bortnyansky (1751–1825)
- Valentyn Borysov (1901–1988)
- Platon Gregoriewitch Brounoff (1859–1924)
- Mikhail Bukinik (1872–1947)
- Konstantyn Dankevych (1905–1984)
- Nikolay Diletsky (c. 1630–after 1680)
- Ivan Domaratsky (late 17th century–early 18th century)
- Eduard Drach (born 1965)
- Levko Dutkivskiy (1943-2023)
- Lesia Dychko (born 1939)
- Mykola Dyletsky (c. 1630–1690)
- Konstantin Eiges (1875–1950)
- Yuriy Fedynsky (born 1975)
- Sebastian z Felsztyna (c. 1480s–after 1543)
- Arkady Filippenko (1912–1983)
- Volodymyr Flys (1924–1987)
- Bohdana Frolyak (born 1968)
- Alexander Gauk (1893–1963)
- Reinhold Glière (1875–1956)
- Mikhail Goldstein (1917–1989)
- Yefim Golyshev (1897–1970)
- Julia Gomelskaya (1964–2016)
- Marian Hadenko (1955–2021)
- Mykhailo Haivoronsky (1892–1949)
- Thomas de Hartmann (1884–1956)
- Hanna Havrylets' (born 1958)
- Vitaliy Hodziatsky (born 1936)
- Leonid Hrabovsky (born 1935)
- Volodymyr Huba (1938–2020)
- Vitaliy Hubarenko (1934–2000)
- Semen Hulak-Artemovsky (1813–1873)
- Roman Hurko (born 1962)
- Apollon Hussakovskyi (1841–1875)
- Volodymyr Ivasyuk (1949–1979)
- Basilio Kaczurak (1919–1987)
- Nikolai Kapustin (1937–2020)
- Ivan Karabyts (1945–2002)
- Ivan Khandoshkin (1747–1804)
- Hnat Khotkevych (1877–1938)
- Dmitri Klebanov (1907–1987)
- Valeri Kikta (born 1941)
- Alexis Kochan (born 1953)
- Filaret Kolessa (1871–1947)
- Mykola Kolessa (1903–2006)
- Taras Kompanichenko (born 1969)
- Anatoliy Kos-Anatolsky (1909–1983)
- Viktor Kosenko (1896–1938)
- Alexander Koshetz (1875–1944)
- Oleksandr Kozarenko (born 1963)
- Pylyp Kozytskiy (1893–1960)
- Oleksandr Krasotov (1936–2007)
- Fritz Kreisler (1875–1962)
- Vitalij Kuprij (born 1974)
- Iryna Kyrylina (1953–2017)
- Hryhory Kytasty (1907–1984)
- Mykola Leontovych (1877–1921)
- Marcin Leopolita (1537–c. 1584)
- Borys Lyatoshynsky (1895–1968)
- Mykola Lysenko (1842–1912)
- Stanyslav Lyudkevych (1879–1979)
- Ilya Lyzohub (1787–1867)
- Heorhiy Maiboroda (1913–1992)
- Platon Maiboroda (1918–1989)
- Eusebius Mandyczewski (1857–1929)
- Igor Markevitch (1912–1983)
- Mykola Markevych (1804–1860)
- Igor Matsiyevsky (born 1941)
- Yuliy Meitus (1903–1997)
- Mykola Mozhovyy (1947–2010)
- Mykola Mykhailov (1903–1936)
- Petro Nishchynsky (1832–1896)
- David Nowakowsky (1877–1921)
- Ostap Nyzhankivsky (1862–1919)
- Yuriy Oliynyk (1931–2021)
- Tomasz Padura (1801–1871)
- Vasyl Pashchenko (1822-1891)
- Vasily Pashkevich (c. 1742–1797)
- Alla Pavlova (born 1952)
- Symeon Pekalytsky (c. 1630–c. at the end of 1690s)
- Ihor Poklad (1941–2025)
- Victoria Poleva (born 1962)
- Sergei Prokofiev (1891–1953)
- Alexey Retinsky (born 1986)
- Levko Revutsky (1889–1877)
- Mykola Roslavets (1881–1944)
- Yudif Rozhavskaya (1923–1982)
- Dorian Rudnytsky (born 1944)
- Volodymyr Runchak (born 1960)
- Mariana Sadovska (born 1972)
- Ihor Shamo (1925–1982)
- Alexander Shchetynsky (born 1960)
- Andriy Shtoharenko (1902–1992)
- Aleksandr Shymko (born 1977)
- Denys Sichynsky (1865–1909)
- Valentyn Silvestrov (born 1937)
- Roman Simovych (1901–1984)
- Mikhail Skorulskyi (1887–1950)
- Myroslav Skoryk (1938–2020)
- Hryhorii Skovoroda (1722–1794)
- Ihor Sonevytsky (1926–2006)
- Yevhen Stankovych (born 1942)
- Yakiv Stepovy (1883–1921)
- Kyrylo Stetsenko (1882–1922)
- Valentyn Sylvestrov (born 1937)
- Bohdan Syroyid (born 1995)
- Stefania Turkewich (1898–1977)
- Roman Turovsky-Savchuk (born 1961)
- Anatole Vakhnianyn (1841–1908)
- Artem Vedel (c. 1767–1808)
- Mykhaylo Verbytsky (1815–1870)
- Vasyl Verkhovynets (1880–1938)
- Hryhoriy Veryovka (1895–1964)
- Bohdan Vesolovsky (1915–1971)
- Iryna Vilinska (1920–1986)
- Mykola Vilinsky (1888–1856)
- Sydir Vorobkevych (1836–1903)
- Konstanty Wileński (born 1949)
- Peter Wilhousky (1902–1978)
- Roman Yakub (born 1958)
- Borys Yanovsky (1875–1933)
- Yakiv Yatsynevych (1869–1945)
- Ludmila Yurina (born 1962)
- Vsevolod Zaderatsky (1891–1953)
- Alla Zahaikevych (born 1966)
- Sigismund Zaremba (1861–1915)
- Vladyslav Zaremba (1833–1902)
- León Zuckert (1904–1992)

== Uruguay ==
- Miguel del Águila (born 1957)
