= Barel (disambiguation) =

Barel is a census town in Barabanki district of Uttar Pradesh, India.

Barel may also refer to:

- Barel language
- Barel Graal, French single-seat motor glider
- Barel Mouko (born 1979), Congolese footballer
- Barel (surname)
