= Ernests =

Male given name

- Gender: Male
- Name day: 13 March

Origin
- Region of origin: Latvia

Other names
- Related names: Ernst, Ernest

Ernests is a Latvian masculine given name. It is a cognate of the masculine given name Ernest and may refer to:

- Ernests Birznieks-Upītis (1871–1960), Latvian writer, translator and librarian
- Ernests Blanks (1894–1972), Latvian publicist, independence advocate
- Ernests Brastiņš (1892–1942), Latvian artist, amateur historian, folklorist and archaeologist
- Ernests Foldāts (1925–2003), Latvian-born Venezuelan botanist and orchidologist
- Ernests Gulbis (born 1988), Latvian professional tennis player
- Ernests Gūtmanis (1901–????), Latvian boxer and Olympic competitor
- Ernests Kalve (born 1987), Latvian basketball forward
- Ernests Mālers (1903–1982), Latvian cyclist and Olympic competitor
- Ernests Štālbergs (1883–1958), Latvian architect
- Ernests Vīgners (1850–1933), Latvian composer and conductor
