= Mihi =

A Mihi is a traditional form of greeting among the Māori people of New Zealand.

The word may refer to several other things and people:

== Places ==
- Mihi, Nepal, a village in northwest Nepal
- Mihi, New Zealand, a village in the Waikato Region
- Mihi Creek heritage site, Queensland, Australia
- Te Mihi Power Station, New Zealand

== People ==
Mihi is sometimes used as a female given name among New Zealand Māori:

- Mihi Edwards (1918–2008), New Zealand writer and social worker
- Mihingarangi "Mihi" Forbes (b. ca 1972), New Zealand television journalist
- Mihi Gabrielle Paki, a sister of Māori King Tuheitia Paki
- Mihi Kōtukutuku Stirling (1870–1956), Māori tribal leader
- Mihi-ki-te-kapua (d. ca 1872), New Zealand Māori composer

in fiction

- Nanny Mihi, character created by Melanie Drewery
- Mihi Hudson, character in television soap opera Shortland Street

== Other ==
- The Māori/Indigenous Health Institute of the University of Otago
