= Gloria González =

Puerto Rican musician

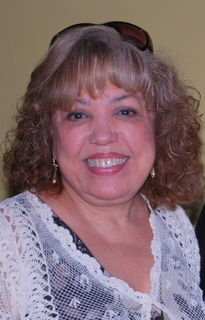

Background information
- Born: April 6, 1944 (age 80)
- Origin: Santurce, Puerto Rico
- Genres: Pop, Salsa
- Occupation: Songwriter
- Website: Official website

Gloria González (born April 6, 1944) is a Puerto Rican composer with an extensive repertoire of pop and salsa songs.

== Early years and education ==
Gloria González Pérez was born on April 6 in Santurce, Puerto Rico. She is the only daughter of Jorge González and Blanca Pérez, both from the town of Arecibo, Puerto Rico.

She attended elementary school at Manuel Padre Rufo School in Santurce, Puerto Rico. Her secondary studies were done at República Del Perú Jr. High, also in Santurce. In 1958, she moved with her father to New York City, where she attended P.S. 71 in Manhattan.

Gloria later returned to Puerto Rico and got married. In 1967, she decided to continue her studies and graduated from Ramírez College as a paralegal secretary.

== Career ==
In 1970, she started working with the Justice Department, but due to a back injury, she retired in 1983. During this period, González became interested in popular music and decided to study at the Music Conservatory; entirely dedicating herself to the composition of musical themes.

She has written well over 300 songs, within the Salsa music genre. Among the artists who have interpreted of her romantic line of songs are Marco Antonio Muñiz, Gilberto Santa Rosa, El Gran Combo, Tony Vega, Frankie Ruiz, Bobby Valentín, Andy Montañez, Carmita Jiménez, Nano Cabrera, Los Hispanos, and Cheo Feliciano.

One of her most famous songs, "Así Es Mi Tierra", was performed by the septet Sol y Canto and accompanied by the Springfield Symphony Orchestra on February 28, 2004.

== Awards and recognition ==
Gloria González has received awards and recognitions from institutions such as the Puerto Rican Institute of Culture (11/28/1986). Broadway Awards (1988), Paoli Award, awards from the municipalities of Carolina and Arecibo (4/8/2002), as well as recognitions in theaters, TV shows in Puerto Rico, Venezuela, Chile, and New York City.

In June 1991, she was honored with the dedication of the annually National Day of Salsa, currently celebrated on the third Sunday in the month of March in Puerto Rico. Bobby Valentín was also honored that day.

In 2007, she was honored at the "Asociación Borinqueña" of Central Florida, in Orlando, Florida for her career as a composer.

== Personal life ==
González has four children from two marriages; Catherine Ivonne and María de los Ángeles (adopted) from her first, and Carlos Javier with her second husband, Juan Rodríguez.

In 2004, she moved to Central Florida, where she currently lives.

== See also ==
- List of composers by nationality
- List of Puerto Ricans
- List of Puerto Rican songwriters
- List of female composers#1940
- Tite Curet Alonso
