= Pēteris Barisons =

Latvian composer and conductor

- Born: 18 April 1904; Sēlpils,
- Died: 13 July 1947
- Occupation: romantic composer

Pēteris Barisons (Sēlpils, 18 April 1904 — 13 July 1947) was a Latvian late romantic composer noted specially for his vocal output, which remain his most performed works. A disciple of Ernests Vīgners and Jānis Mediņš, in 1945 he was appointed a professor at the Latvian Conservatory, but he died just two years later, leaving a third symphony uncompleted.

He was also active in conducting, which he studied under Jāzeps Vītols, briefly taking charge of the Latvian National Symphony for the 1936–37 season, and he premiered his Symphony No. 1 himself.

== Works ==
=== Orchestral ===
- Andante cantabile (1933)
- Scherzo (1933)
- Symphony No. 1 (1935)
- Three Preludes (1935)
- Tragic Poem (1936)
- Līgo (1936)
- Flower Wind (or Wreath of Flowers) (symphonic suite) (1937)
- Symphony No. 2 Romantic (1939)
- Latvian Rhapsody for Piano and Orchestra (1945)
- Childhood Morning (symphonic suite) (1946)
- Formal Overture (unfinished)
- Symphony No. 3 (unfinished)

=== Chamber ===
- Cradle Song for violin and piano (1929)
- Scherzo for violin and piano (1929)
- Evening Song for cello and piano (1931)
- String Quartet (1932)
- Sunset song for violin and piano (1933)
- Melody for violin and piano (1933)
- Toy for violin and piano (1933)

=== Piano ===
- Sonata No. 1 (1932)
- Cradle Song (1936)
- Four Preludes (1937)
- Four Lyrical Miniatures (1937)
- Andante con dolore (1937)
- Étude (1937)
- Sonata No. 2 (1944)
- Prelude in E-flat minor (1944)
- Prelude in D Major (1947)

=== Accompanied vocal ===
==== With orchestra ====
- Bright Hour (1933)
- Homeland (1935)
- Wonderland (1938)
- Island of the Dead (1938)

==== With organ ====
- Prayer for Organ and Chorus (1938)

==== With piano ====
- May Clock
- A Girl's Song (1930)
- Ziedonis; Youth; Unsafe Bridge, Country Girl (1934)
- Sea, Child's Views (1936)
- Mood; Bridge; Call; Hands (1937)
- Gaviles; Your Eyes; In the Cemetery; Anything (1938)
- All Treasures (1939)
- Youth (1941)
- Souvenir (1943)
- When Will You Come Again?; Ah, You Shouldn't Be So Sad, Mother (1944)
- The Gulf of Zemgale (1944)
- Tatty (1945)
- For Young People (1946)

=== Solo vocal ===
==== Songs for mixed choir ====
- A Small Nightingale; Easter Morning; Staburags (1927)
- As Snow at the Mountain Tops; Along the Star Road; On the Banks of my Homeland (1928)
- You, the Endless Sea; Hail to the Song; Behind the Mist, My Motherland, Dear (1930)
- Autumn Song; Songs of the Great Flyer; Holy Ambassador (1930)
- Muses (1934)
- You, the Quiet Shores of the Sea of Life; Spring Day; Motherland (1937)
- Latvia; Road Paths (1938) — Blue Dream Mountains; Music; Going Friends; Flowering Days (1939)
- Dusi; God's Garden; During the Harvest Festival (1943)
- Morning (1946)
- The Song is a Big Day Today (1947)

==== Songs for men's choir ====
- Broken Pines; Daugava; Celies
- Night; The Cradle's Song for the Heart (1939)

==== Songs for women's choir ====
- The Mermaid's Song (1929)
- Still Heart (1932)
- Melodies; Diltin Dila (1936)
