= Upītis =

Family name

Origin
- Origin: Latvian
- Meaning: "river"

Upītis (feminine: Upīte) is a Latvian masculine surname, derived from the Latvian word for "river" (upe). Individuals with the surname include:

- Ernests Birznieks-Upītis (1871–1960), Latvian writer, translator and librarian
- Juris Upītis (born 1991), Latvian ice hockey player
- Pēteris Upītis (1896–1976), Latvian horticulturist
- Pēteris Upītis (1899–1989), Latvian graphic artist and art collector
