= Birznieks =

Birznieks is a Latvian masculine surname. Notable people with the surname include:

- Alfrēds Birznieks (1889–1943), Latvian politician
- Ernests Birznieks-Upītis (1871–1960), Latvian writer, translator and librarian
