= Barel (surname) =

Barel or Bar-El is a surname. It may be a Hebrew surname בראל. Notable people with the surname include:

- Fabien Barel (born 1980), French downhill mountain biker
- Gal Barel (born 1990), Israeli footballer
- Joav BarEl (1933–1977), Israeli artist, critic, and lecturer
- Johan Van Barel (born 1964), Belgian composer
- Moe Bar-El – Iranian actor (born 1992)
- Navit Barel – Israeli poet, translator, literary editor, literary researcher (born 1977)
- Olesya Barel (born 1960), Russian player
- Rob Barel (born 1957), Dutch athlete
- Virgile Barel (1889–1979), French Communist politician
