= Juan Pampin =

Argentine composer and sound artist (born 1967)

Juan Pampin (born January 23, 1967) is an Argentine composer and sound artist who lives and works in Seattle.

== Biography ==
Since 2002, Pampin has been a professor of composition at the University of Washington and a founding faculty member of the Center for Digital Arts and Experimental Media (DXARTS). He received an MA in Composition from the Conservatoire National Superieur de Musique de Lyon, France and a DMA in Composition from Stanford University, where he studied with composer Jonathan Harvey.

Juan Pampin's works explore the territory articulated by the concept of space, memory, and material, using mostly algorithmic composition and signal processing tools of his own development. His compositions, including works for instrumental, digital, and mixed media, have been performed around the world by world-class soloists and ensembles such as Susana Kasakoff, Les Percussions de Strasbourg, Arditti String Quartet, and Sinfonia 21.

== Selected works ==
- Apocalypse was Postponed due to lack of interest (1994) for computer generated sound.
- Metal Hurlant (1996) for solo percussion and electronic sounds.
- Toco Madera (1997) for percussion duo and electronic sounds.
- Interstices (1997) for string quartet.
- Skin Heads (1998) for percussion trio and electronic sounds.
- On Space (2000/2005) for percussion sextet and surround electronic sounds.
- UOM (2001) for surround electronics sounds.
- Catch 22 degree zero (2004) for two laptops.
- Catch 22 goes underground (2005) site-specific sound installation.
- Four Studies (2005) for vibraphone.
- Tropos (2005) site-specific sound installation.
- Catch 22 goes online (2006) telematic sound installation.
- Nada (2006) for viola and electronic sounds
- Entanglement (2008) for telematic sound installation.

== Discography ==
- Four Etudes For Vibraphone. Philippe Limoge. Magic Vibes, 2005.
- OID. Susanna Kasakoff, piano. BAU Records, 2006.
- Nada. Melia Watras, viola. Fleur de Son, CD FDS-57992, 2008.
- Percussion Cycle (Metal Hurlant, Toco Madera, Skin Heads, On Space). Les Percussion de Strasbourg (in production).

== Bibliography ==
- Di Liscia, Pablo; Basso Gustavo; Pampin, Juan. 2009. Musica y espacio: ciencia, tecnologia y estetica. Music and Science collection of University of Quilmes Press (currently in press).
- Pampin, Juan; Kollin, Joel; Kang, Eunsu. 2007. "Application of Ultrasonic Sound Beams in Performance and Sound Art". Proceedings of 2007 International Computer Music Conference (ICMC), Copenhagen.
- Pampin, Juan; Di Liscia, Pablo: Moss, William: Norman, Alex. 2004. "ATS User Interfaces". Proceedings of the 2004 International Computer Music Conference.
- Di Liscia, Pablo; Pampin, Juan. 2003. "Spectral Analysis Based Synthesis and Transformation of Digital Sound: The ATSH Program". Proceedings IX Brazilian Symposium on Computer Music, Campinas, Brasil.
- Pampin, Juan. 1999. "ATS: A Lisp Environment for Spectral Modeling". Proceedings of the 1999 Int. Computer Music Conference, Beijing, China.
- Pampin, Juan; L. Lezcano, Fernando; Schottstaedt, Bill. 1999. "Common Lisp Music Update Report". Proceedings of the 1999 Int. Computer Music Conference, Beijing, China.
- Garcia, Guillermo; Pampin, Juan. 1999. "Data Compression of Sinusoidal Modeling Parameters Based on Psychoacoustic Masking". Proceedings of the 1999 Int. Computer Music Conference, Beijing, China.
