= Lucie Vellère =

Belgian composer

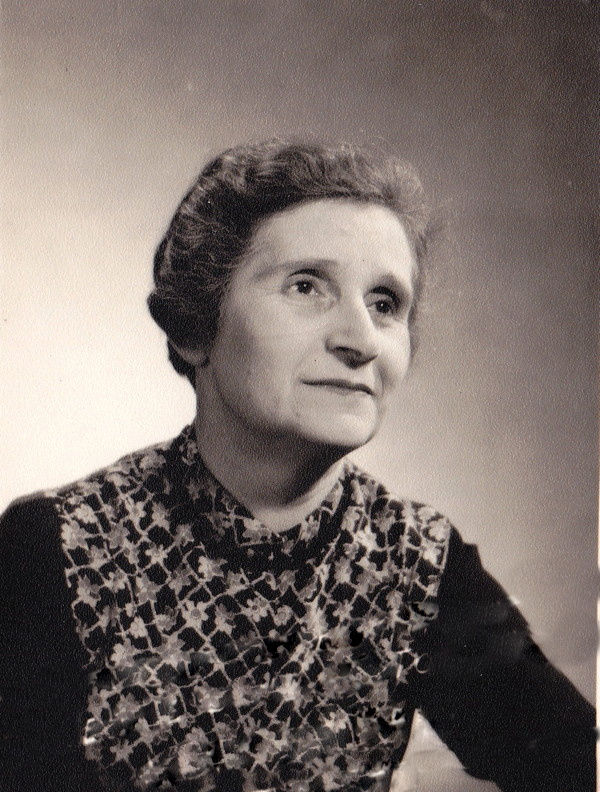
Lucie Vellère

Lucie Vellère (23 December 1896 – 12 October 1966) was a Belgian composer.

== Biography ==
Lucie Vellère was born in Brussels, and began piano lessons with her father at the age of six. She studied with Emile Chaumont for violin, Paul Miry for harmony, and Joseph Jongen for composition. She was awarded the 1957 "Prix du Brabant" and received an award from the American Section of the International Council for Women for her compositions. She made her primary living as a pharmacist and composed as a hobby.

== Selected works ==
Vellère composed works for voice, solo instruments, chamber ensembles, chorus and orchestra in a traditional style. Most of her works show impressionistic tendencies.

- Chanson nocturne (for violin and piano) 1920
- String Quartet No. 1 in d minor 1937
- String Quartet No. 2 in e minor 1942
- Piano Trio 1947
- Fantaisie en trois mouvement (for violin and piano) 1950
- String Quartet No. 3 1951
- Nocturne (for cello and piano) 1954
- Petite Symphony 1956
- Arlequinade (for trumpet and piano) 1959
- Bagatelles (String Trio) 1960
- Dialogue (for oboe and piano) 1960
- Intermède (for flute and piano) 1960
- Sonata for violin and viola 1961
- Divertissement (for violin and piano) 1962
- String Quartet No. 4 1962
- Quartet (for 4 clarinets) 1963
- Epitaphe pour un ami (Epitaph for a Friend) for viola and string orchestra 1964
- Quartet (for flute, oboe, clarinet and bassoon) 1964
- Deux essais (for trumpet, horn and trombone) 1965

=== Discography ===
- String Quartet #3. On Vive la Différence: String Quartets by 5 Women from 3 Continents, Leonarda CD #LE336 (1997)
