= Barel =

- town
- Location in Uttar Pradesh, India Barel (India)
- Coordinates: 26°58′0.328″N 81°11′23.788″E
- Country: India
- State: Uttar Pradesh
- District: Barabanki

Area
  - Total: 5 km^{2} (1.9 sq mi)

Population (2011)
  - Total: 27,207
- Time zone: UTC+5:30 (IST)
- PIN: 225203
- literacy rate: 73.86
- Sex ratio: 1.21

Barel is a census town in Barabanki district of Uttar Pradesh, India.

== Demographics ==
According to the 2011 Census of India, Barel had a population of 27,207 and a total area of 5 square kilometres (1.9 sq mi). Males and females constituted 54.83 per cent and 45.17 per cent respectively of the population. Literacy at that time was 73.86 per cent. People classified as Scheduled Castes under India's system of positive discrimination accounted for 13.34 per cent of the population.
