= List of women composers =

List of women composers may refer to:

- List of women composers by birth date
- List of women composers by name
