= Esther Alejandro de León =

Puerto Rican composer (born 1947)

Esther Alejandro de León (born March 10, 1947) is a Puerto Rican composer.

Born in New York City, Alejandro de León returned to Puerto Rico with her family while still a girl. She studied languages at the University of Puerto Rico; with Luis Antonio Ramírez she took lessons in composition and music pedagogy at the Conservatory of Music of Puerto Rico. In 1972 she worked with Nadia Boulanger in Fontainebleau; she also took composition and conducting lessons at the University of California, Los Angeles. In 1980 she composed a work for children for narrator and orchestra, El zapatero prodigioso after the Hans Christian Andersen tale "The Shoemaker and the Elves"; commissioned by the Conservatory, it was later taken up by the Puerto Rico Symphony Orchestra, becoming the first work by a Puerto Rican woman in their repertoire. Unusually for Alejandro, the piece is tonal; much of her work tends instead towards atonality. She has composed for a variety of instrumental combinations, including a good deal of orchestral music; she has also produced chamber music, songs, piano works, and pieces for tape and synthesizer, and has been active as well as a choral arranger.
