= Fritz Bovet =

Fritz Bovet (fl. 1845–1888) was a Swiss romantic era composer and violinist.

== Published works ==
The only work now in print by Fritz Bovet is his String Quartet, Op. 14. First published in 1911, it was republished in the 1990s by Merton Music. Merton Music was a publisher of chamber music initiated, grown, and maintained by Theo Wyatt in London, UK. His last catalogue was published in 2009.

In the Merton publication of Bovet's quartet, Wyatt refers to a writing of Wilhelm Altmann (1862–1951), who recorded that "this quartet was published in Plymouth in 1911". Wyatt continued: "But of Fritz Bovet himself not a word is to be found in any musical reference book. From publications about the famous Swiss watchmaking firm of Bovet, which had a flourishing trade with China, you will learn that Fritz was the grandson of the founder of the firm and was sent to Canton in 1845 where he was noted for playing his violin 'with the enthusiasm of a Paganini', where he collected and transcribed Chinese popular melodies for incorporation in his firm's musical boxes, and where he became French vice-consul."

Bovet's String Quartet, Op. 14 was republished by Edition Silvertrust with a catalog listing stating that Fritz was a pen name, and that his real identity was Frederick Bovet (1825–1913). The Bovet website apparently refers to him as Frédéric Bovet, and his brother as Édouard Bovet
