= Nariman Azimov =

Nariman Azimov Nəriman Əzimov
- Born: June 1, 1936; Ganja, Azerbaijan SSR, USSR
- Died: October 19, 2016 (aged 80) Baku, Azerbaijan
- Genres: mugham
- Occupations: conductor, composer
- Instrument: tar
- Education: Hajibeyov Azerbaijan State Conservatoire
- Awards: Honored Artist of the Azerbaijan SSR

Nariman Abbasgulu oghlu Azimov (Azerbaijani: Nəriman Abbasqulu oğlu Əzimov, June 1, 1936 — November 19, 2016) was an Azerbaijani conductor, composer, People's Artiste of Azerbaijan.

== Biography ==
Nariman Azimov was born on June 1, 1936, in Ganja. In 1955 he entered the Faculty of Conducting of the Hajibeyov Azerbaijan State Conservatoire. He worked as a choirmaster in the Choir of AzTR, and since 1974 has been the art director and chief conductor of the Said Rustamov Azerbaijan State Orchestra of Folk Instruments. AzTV CJSC worked as a sound director. In 2003, he became a professor.

Nariman Azimov died on November 19, 2016, in Baku.

== Awards ==
- People's Artiste of Azerbaijan — May 4, 1991
- Honored Artist of the Azerbaijan SSR — June 29, 1977
- Shohrat Order — November 7, 2016
- Honorary Decree of the Supreme Soviet of the Azerbaijan SSR — December 9, 1982
