= Henry Wyn =

Belgian composer and pianist

Henry (or Henri) Wyn (1910 - 1989) was a Belgian composer and pianist.

Wyn composed the musical scores for at least two Belgian films and also recorded as a pianist with a group called "Henri Wyn et ses Rythmes".

Wyn's compositions were at least partly published by the music publishing company ""L’art belge", owned by composer Léon Frings.

== Film ==
- 1936 - J'ai gagné un million
- 1937 - Le roi soldat
