= Johan Van Barel =

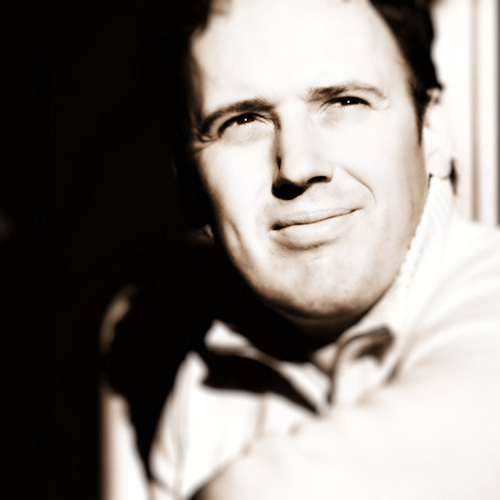
- Van Barel in 2012

Background information
- Born: Johan Arthur Van Barel; 3 October 1964 (age 61)
- Origin: Bornem, Belgium
- Genres: Soundtrack; Cinematic; Classical
- Occupations: Composer; Producer; Digital Artist
- Instruments: Piano; Keyboard
- Years active: 1998–present
- Website: vanbarel.eu.org

Johan Arthur Van Barel (born 3 October 1964, Bornem, Belgium) is a Belgian composer, producer and digital artist. He wrote and produced music for movies and games, drawing inspiration from romantic classics and film noir themes. Over the years, he has collaborated with emerging directors and game creators.

== Collaborations ==
Date	Event
01/01/2011	Japanese television NTV broadcasts a short documentary about the gnu called The Ford by Andrzej Olesiak. Footage was taken in the Serengeti National Park in Tanzania in 2010. Several orchestral pieces were licensed for the soundtrack.
01/07/2010	The Alberni Project, a tribute to the men who served on HMCS(Her Majesty's Canadian Ship) Alberni (1941–1944) during World War II, licenses the orchestral music Big Bang and Autumn Evenings.
01/10/2009	Coproduction Komodo by underwater photographer Filip Staes wins the first price for best musical adaptation at the famous World Festival of Underwater Images 2009 in Marseille in the category diaporama. The Komodo media production is a photo presentation from a diving journey he made in Komodo, Indonesia. Filip Staes is an international renowned underwater photographer who has won several prizes with his photo-projects fi. he won the first prize in 2007 at the famous Antibes World Festival of Underwater Images.
06/11/2008	Cooperation with New York based avantgarde video artist G.H. Hovagimyan resulted in a film project called Plazaville. This project contains a series of 31 shortfilms. Death March, Shadows, Struggle For Life, Target Zero and Agent FX were licensed for this project. Plazaville is a new media video artwork based on the classic 1965 movie Alphaville by Jean Luc Godard. It is a noir/sci-fi, "no budget" movie set in 21st Century New York City. Scenes from the original Alphaville are re-enacted, interpreted and improvised by artists, actors and videographers, directed by G.H. Hovagimyan, and shot in HD video. Video artist Christina McPhee films the ambient POPS (publicly owned private plazas) of Wall Street, then remixes with retro punk sounds plus "Alpha60" computer voice-overs. Plazaville is a 2009 commission of New Radio and Performing Arts, Inc., (aka Ether-Ore) for its Turbulence web site made possible with funding from the New York City Department of Cultural Affairs. Additional support for Plazaville came from the Lower Manhattan Cultural Council's Swing Space program, created with lead support from the September 11th Fund and space donated by The Sapir Organization. The Hudson River Park Trust, The Emily Harvey Foundation, School of Visual Arts and Truth & Pride Inc. also contributed to the making of Plazaville. Exhibitions: 2009 Art Cologne (DE), 2009 Pace Digital Gallery NYC (USA)
10/09/2008	Italian video producer Marcello Pizzi was granted a music license for his touristic video animation aimed at a junior audience for the Italian region called Molise (DVD).
26/06/2008	India film director Gajendra Shrotriya was granted a license agreement to use some tracks in his film projects.
27/05/2008	The piece Veerle's Ballad was licensed in a commercial for a video software product from Singular Software.
22/03/2008	Coproduction with German composer Jean Sevriens for end-mastering of his harp concerto called Tanghetto.
31/01/2008	Hungarian Animation artist Kisantal Tibor has released his 3D animation project Götepeték. The pieces Sky Dream and Forgive were licensed. The full animation can be viewed here.
22/08/2007	Coproduction with German composer Jean Sevriens for digital rendering and end-mastering of his piano composition called Spanjaard.
10/08/2006	Brass arrangement for a piece called Stem Voor Mij by Fritz Van den Heuvel aka Joris Vermassen, a Belgian visual artist and cartoonist.
08/08/2006	French-Canadian brickfilms animation artist Marc André (aka Bob Page) was granted a music license for Struggle For Life and Agent FX for use in his newest stop-motion animation named Worst Case Scenario III.
01/07/2006	The music composed and arranged for the film Twee Vrienden Maken Een Boek was completed. The film was ordered by the city of Temse and directed by Walter Dierick. VRT speaker Lies Martens created the lyrics. The film will be performed during the exhibition Honderd En Meer Verhalen Zien, showing a 10 year overview of the best works by Flemish Illustrator Marijke Meersman. The exhibition runs from juli 1 until september 24 2006 in AC De Zaat in Temse. In 2007, a DVD of the film was released.
28/06/2006	The film Pirates of the Drachtstervaart receives an honourable mention at Expose Your Talent, a film contest for young talented filmmakers. Junior director Jürgen Visser was granted a license for Target Zero and Struggle For Life in his film.
26/04/2006	Belgian singer-song writer, musician and multi-talented performer Dirk Blanchart asks for orchestral arrangements for 2 songs for his newest music album Pretty Dark Album appearing in September 2006. The pieces are Pre-Millennium Friend and Gates Of Heaven.
22/03/2006	Evo Devo – Tribal Brass Orchestral Remix for The Terms Remix Contest released. "I immediately recognized the enormous animal power that goes from this song by The Terms. That is why I wanted to enhance this feeling of primitive tribal energy. I started by building an African style primitive tribal percussion spine. Then I underlined the energetic accents with a huge orchestral big band arrangement. I mastered with some extra incremented excitement in the highs to make it sparkle."
12/03/2006	Coproduction with Veteran Club DJ, producer, Singer-Songwriter, Musician David Floodstrand on an orchestral arrangement for his jazz song called "Universe". Floodstrand comments on his collaboration: "Johan is a brilliant arranger, and composer. I had the opportunity to work with him on an orchestral arrangement of one of my compositions co-written with Ulli Fassbender entitled "Uni-verse" for my Criterion International label. I would recommend Johan for any project that needs scoring, and/or orchestral arranging. He prefers to work with "real" instrument sounds, if you cannot afford to hire a full orchestra, Johan is the next best thing."
29/09/2005	Film director Nitin Bal Chauhan was granted a license to use Autumn Evenings and Tired Of Sleeping in his newest documentary "Lost Or Found" that was nominated for best cinematography at The Art House in Singapore as part of the Asian Festival of First Films 2006 and officially selected for screening at the New York Film Festival 2007.
13/09/2005	Animation artist Lewis Chen has released his newest Brickfilms stop-motion animation Repent. The pieces Agent FX and Forgive were licensed.
02/07/2005	Junior film director and VFX artist Perry Kroll was granted a license to use several orchestral works in his early film projects.
16/02/2005	Finnish Art Student Jari Koljonen uses the piece Missing Him for his short-film Kun Vuosi Jäi Vajaaksi.
21/04/2004	Spanish film director Aitor Gaizka was granted a license agreement to use some orchestral works in his newest film project.
21/08/2003	The piece Tired Of Sleeping was used in the game Neverwinter Nights by Uraj Studios (aka Elegia Eternum) and Assassins of the Night by Arid Productions.
04/07/2003	Tired Of Sleeping was remastered by Ricky Castro, Kenji Uchiyama and John Mestesk.

== Discography ==
=== Singles ===
Title	Date	ISRC	UPC
Pure Yasemin	2024/07/12	DKD3Z0015139	5715766002315
Ripples Of Reflection	2024/07/23	DKD3Z0015760	5715766004449
Eternal Entanglement	2024/07/30	DKD3Z0016251	5715766006405
Capriccio Fantasia	2024/08/03	DKD3Z0016744	5715766008102
Mystic Odyssey	2024/08/09	DKD3Z0016957	5715766009031
Adagio Lamentoso	2024/08/14	DKD3Z0017219	5715766010297
Whispers Of The Fallen	2024/08/17	DKD3Z0017422	5715766011263
Ancient Discovery	2024/09/02	DKD3Z0018065	5715766014554
Silent Revelation	2024/09/13	DKD3Z0018465	5715766016350
Epic Chase	2024/09/20	DKD3Z0018675	5715766017586
Capriccio Tempestoso	2024/09/23	DKD3Z0018817	5715766018316
Onde Ondeggianti	2024/10/07	DKD3Z0019332	5715766020302
Drifting Away	2024/10/12	DKD3Z0019651	5715766021163
Celebrating Hope	2024/10/16	DKD3Z0019980	5715766021910
Echoes Of Enchantment	2024/10/28	DKD3Z0020020	5715766022191
Heroic Journey	2024/11/04	DKD3Z0020160	5715766022627
Tango Solitaire	2024/11/11	DKD3Z0020191	5715766022771
Soaring Fate	2024/11/18	DKD3Z0020285	5715766023037
Audacious Modulations	2024/11/25	DKD3Z0020746	5715766024447
Autumn Reverie	2024/12/02	DKD3Z0021092	5715766025451
New Horizons	2024/12/09	DKD3Z0021681	5715766027608
Fearless Spirit	2024/12/16	DKD3Z0021904	5715766028292
Slavonic Soul	2024/12/23	DKD3Z0022088	5715766028742
Tribal Resonance	2024/12/30	DKD3Z0022337	5715766029442
Miniature Intermezzo	2025/01/06	DKD3Z0022952	5715766030950
Tiny Spark	2025/02/04	DKD3Z0024615	5715766035771
Glistening Reminiscence	2025/05/05	DKD3Z0025483	5715766039069
Transylvanian Revenants	2025/05/08	DKD3Z0025530	5715766039281
Lingering Lament	2025/05/18	DKD3Z0025644	5715766039571
Chasing Shadows	2025/05/26	DKD3Z0025844	5715766040096
Great Expectations	2025/05/29	DKD3Z0025415	5715766038833
Arcadian Utopia	2025/06/05	DKD3Z0025972	5715766040560
Crystal Shimmering	2025/06/14	DKD3Z0026165	5715766041109
Dwindling Presence	2025/06/24	DKD3Z0026469	5715766041956
Spellbound Passage	2025/07/22	DKD3Z0027035	5715766043806
Cascading Time	2025/07/28	DKD3Z0027188	5715766044063
Faded Frame	2025/11/10	DKD3Z0029075	5715766049372

Album: Impressions (Release Date:1/12/2020 – UPC: 0616293831285 – Label: Amuse)

Track	Title
1	Scavenger Hunt
2	Strange Behaviour
3	Cadenza For Strings
4	Intricate Deception
5	Fighting The Disease
6	Don't Look Back
7	Villain Chase
8	Fletcher
9	Tired Of Sleeping
10	Komodo
11	Twee Vrienden Maken Een Boek
12	Shadows
13	Coming Home
14	Struggle For Life
15	Agent FX
16	Missing Him

Album: Rachmaninov (Release Date:11/03/2021 – UPC: 7316211054439 – Label: Amuse)

Track	Title
1	Prelude Op.3 No.2.wav
2	Prelude Op.23 No.2.wav
3	Prelude Op.23 No.3.wav
4	Prelude Op.23 No.4.wav
5	Prelude Op.23 No.5.wav
6	Prelude Op.23 No.6.wav
7	Prelude Op.23 No.7.wav
8	8. Prelude Op.23 No.8.wav
9	Prelude Op.23 No.9.wav
10	Prelude Op.23 No.10.wav
11	Prelude Op.32 No.5.wav
12	Prelude Op.32 No.12.wav
13	Moments Musicaux Op.16 No.1.wav
14	Moments Musicaux Op.16 No.2.wav
15	Moments Musicaux Op.16 No.3.wav
16	Moments Musicaux Op.16 No.4.wav
17	Elegie Op.3 No.1.wav
18	Etude-Tableau Op.33 No.2.wav
19	Etude-Tableau Op.33 No.3.wav
20	Etude-Tableau Op.33 No.5.wav
21	Etude-Tableau Op.33 No.7.wav
22	Etude-Tableau Op.39 No.1.wav
23	Etude-Tableau Op.39 No.5.wav
24	Etude-Tableau Op.39 No.6.wav

== Sources ==
- ISNI Registration: https://isni.org/isni/0000000517791889
- Kunstendatabank Belgium: https://kg.kunsten.be/wiki/Nederlands:Johan_Van_Barel_(Q543613)
- Metason Artist Info: https://music.metason.net/artistinfo?name=Johan%20Van%20Barel
- AcademiaLab: https://academia-lab.com/enciclopedia/lista-de-compositores-por-nacionalidad/
- MusicBrainz: https://musicbrainz.org/artist/b2195fd4-2c8e-4eee-b5bc-b086fa140fcf
- Spotify: https://open.spotify.com/artist/6FHgYR3Y9ke9s07HhkDSDN/discography/all
- AppleMusic: https://music.apple.com/us/artist/johan-van-barel/1538950819
- YoutubeMusic 1: https://music.youtube.com/playlist?list=OLAK5uy_mJBPcpa6-N5yZXgWaiLtwQvNXc72qgGQ8
- YoutubeMusic 2: https://music.youtube.com/playlist?list=OLAK5uy_n_k9GuvwrHX2c8MfDwYzp9OruKx6-dG4w
- Shazam: https://www.shazam.com/artist/johan-van-barel/1538950819
- LinkedIn: https://www.linkedin.com/in/vanbarel/details/experience/
