= Don Fabian =

Argentine Bolero composer, pianist, & conductor

Don Fabian (born Domingo Fabiano) was an Argentine Bolero composer, pianist and orchestra conductor.

Born in Cordoba, Argentina to Isabel Monferrato, daughter to an Italian musician, he learned music on his mother's piano. At a very early age he started playing live music for silent films in cinemas. Later he joined the "Los Diablos Rojos" orchestra conducted by Vicente Saturnini. Don Fabian used to perform at the old Eden Hotel in La Falda (a town located in the Cordoba mountains). At the age of 24 he left Cordoba and relocated to Buenos Aires where he began composing music for Jazz, Tango and Pop music ballads.

He then formed his first orchestra "Don Fabian y su Trio Vocal" which gained great success in the late 1940s and early 1950s. He also conducted the "Radio El Mundo" resident orchestra from 1946 to 1955. He wrote some of the most popular Bolero songs and ballads including "Corazón de Dios", "Cobardia", "Cumbia que vas de ronda" and "Dos almas".
