= Yakiv Yatsynevych =

Ukrainian composer, conductor, and folklorist (1869–1945)

Yakiv Yatsynevych

Yakiv Mykhailovych Yatsynevych (Ukrainian: Яків Михайлович Яциневич, 8 November 1869–25 April 1945) was a prominent Ukrainian composer, conductor, and folklorist, known for his eclectic works.

== Biography ==
Yakiv Mikhailovych Yatsynevych was born on 8 November [O.S. 27 October] 1869 in Bila Tserkva, a city now in the Kyiv Oblast. He studied with the Ukrainian composer Mykola Lysenko in Kyiv, and was his long-time assistant. From 1903 to 1906, he conducted the men's choir at Kyiv University. He conducted the M.V. Lysenko Singing Troupe at Odesa from 1925 until 1930.

Yatsynevych's works include a symphony "Year 1905" and the oratorio Skorbna Maty, with words by the Ukrainian poet Pavlo Tychyna. He wrote church music (Sluzhba Bozha, cantatas on the Themes of St. George, Basil, Peter, and Paul), choral works, and about 200 songs.

The Soviet authorities allowed him to work as a village teacher and an amateur music instructor. He constantly changed his residence, living in the villages in the Kyiv region and in Eastern Ukraine. He was sent to the Adyghe Autonomous Oblast in the Caucasus, and later was employed to guard a collective farm garden in the Krasnodar Krai region. He worked in Zaporizhzhia from 1930 until 1940, and in the Russian city of Maykop between 1940 and 1945, where he conducted the Adygea Song and Dance Ensemble.

Yatsynevych died on 25 April 1945, at Kropotkin, Krasnodar Krai.

== Sources ==
- Onatsky, E., ed. (1967). "Yatsynevich Yakiv". Ukrainian Small Encyclopedia (in Ukrainian). Buenos Aires: UAOC in Argentina.
