= William Ortiz-Alvarado =

Puerto Rican composer (born 1947)

William Ortiz-Alvarado (also William Ortiz Alvarado or William Ortiz; born 1947 in Salinas, Puerto Rico) is an American composer of contemporary classical music, musician, and educator. He was raised in New York City.

After studying composition with at the Puerto Rico Conservatory of Music, he received his M.A. from Stony Brook University. He was later granted the Ph.D. in Composition from the University at Buffalo.

Ortiz-Alvarado has an extensive catalog of works for orchestra and chamber ensemble.
