= Juan Garcia Estrada =

Argentine composer

Juan Agustín García Estrada
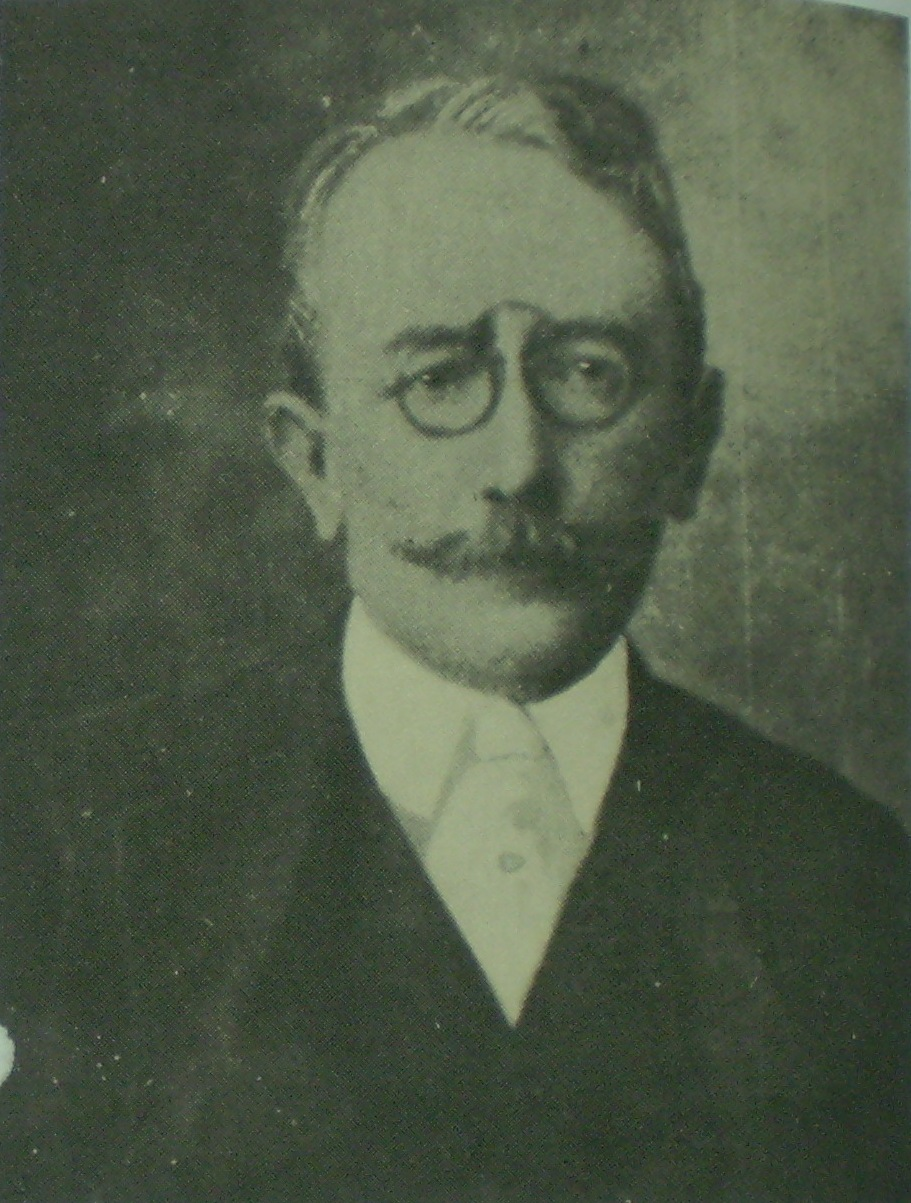
- Born: November 8, 1895; Buenos Aires
- Died: September 27, 1961 (aged 65); Buenos Aires
- Occupation: Composer

Juan Garcia Estrada (1895–1961) was an Argentine symphonic composer of a series of symphonic dances, among them the Ruralia Argentina. He studied first with José Gil in Buenos Aires and then with Jacques Ibert in Paris.

After returning to Argentina, he virtually abandoned music, becoming a Justice of the Peace. His granddaughter is named Milagros Fernandez Castro.
