= Barel Graal =

French single-seat motor glider, 2002

Graal

General information
- Type: Motor glider
- National origin: France
- Manufacturer: Graal Aéro
- Designer: Max Barel

History
- Introduction date: 2002
- First flight: 2 February 2002

The Barel Graal (English: Grail) is a French mid-wing, T-tailed single-seat motor glider that was designed by Max Barel and produced by Graal Aéro as a complete ready-to-fly aircraft or as a kit for amateur construction.

== Design and development ==
The Graal was designed as a low-cost, self-launching FAI 15 Metre Class motorglider that conforms to the French and Fédération Aéronautique Internationale ultralight rules. Because of the low wing loading imposed by the ultralight rules it was not intended to be a competitive sailplane, but to be used for recreational soaring. It was first flown on 2 February 2002.

The aircraft is made from composites and features an unusual tail configuration. The fuselage joins the T-tail halfway up the vertical stabilizer. The folding three-bladed propeller is mounted at the rear of the fuselage and so the lower half of the fin protects the propeller from contacting the ground. The 25 kW (34 hp) twin cylinder RDM 200 engine is mounted inside the fuselage, just behind the pilot, using trap doors for cooling and exhaust. The engine drives the tail-mounted propeller through an extension shaft. The propeller folds automatically when the engine is shut down due to aerodynamic drag and also deploys automatically on engine start by centrifugal effect as it starts to spin. A fuselage mounted fuel tank holds 12 litres (2.6 imp gal; 3.2 US gal). The Graal has a semi-tapered wing with a 15 m (49.2 ft) span that features top and bottom dive brakes, full-span flaperons and employs an Eppler E668 airfoil. Landing gear is a retractable monowheel gear and the aircraft has a ballistic parachute.

The Graal disassembles and is transported in a lightweight trailer.

In 2002 the company indicated the aircraft cost €35000 for a complete ready-to-fly aircraft and €21000 for a quick-build kit.

== Specifications (Graal) ==
Data from World Directory of Leisure Aviation 2003–04 and Company website

General characteristics

- Crew: one
- Length: 6 m (19 ft 8 in)
- Wingspan: 15.00 m (49 ft 3 in)
- Wing area: 10 m^{2} (110 sq ft)
- Aspect ratio: 22.5:1
- Airfoil: Eppler E668
- Empty weight: 200 kg (441 lb)
- Gross weight: 300 kg (661 lb)
- Fuel capacity: 12 litres (2.6 imp gal; 3.2 US gal)
- Powerplant: 1 × RDM 200 twin cylinder engine with electric start, 25 kW (34 hp)
- Propellers: 3-bladed composite, folding

Performance

- Stall speed: 60 km/h (37 mph, 32 kn)
- Never exceed speed: 180 km/h (110 mph, 97 kn)
- g limits: +/-6
- Maximum glide ratio: 40:1 at 80 km/h (50 mph)
- Rate of climb: 3.5 m/s (690 ft/min)
- Rate of sink: 0.5 m/s (98 ft/min) at 65 km/h (40 mph)
- Wing loading: 30 kg/m^{2} (6.1 lb/sq ft)

== See also ==
- List of gliders
