= Andrés Castro Ríos =

Puerto Rican composer and writer

- Born: October 4, 1942; Santurce, San Juan, Puerto Rico
- Died: September 16, 2006 (aged 63); Santurce, San Juan, Puerto Rico
- Education: University of Puerto Rico
- Occupation: Poet

Andrés Castro Ríos (October 4, 1942, Santurce, San Juan, Puerto Rico – September 16, 2006, Santurce, Puerto Rico) was a poet and graduate from the Humanities Faculty of the University of Puerto Rico. Castro Ríos is known as one of the founders of the "Guajana" magazine and as one of the composer of the lyrics for "¡Coño, Despierta Boricua!" (along with Miguel Ángel Hidalgo Vega—better known by his pen name "Guarionex Hidalgo Africano"—and Francisco Matos Paoli), a famous patriotic Puerto Rican song related to the Grito de Lares. Castro Ríos died from a heart attack in 2006.

== See also ==
- List of Puerto Ricans
