= Platon Gregoriewitch Brounoff =

Conductor, arranger, and composer (1863–1924)

Platon Brounoff
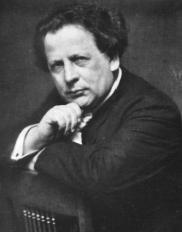
- Portrait of Platon Brounoff
- Born: May 10, 1863; Yelisavetgrad, Russian Empire
- Died: July 11, 1924; New York, US
- Parent(s): Gregory and Pauline

Platon Gregoriewitch Brounoff (10 May 1863 in Yelisavetgrad, Russian Empire; – 11 July 1924 in New York, United States) was a conductor, arranger and composer of Yiddish music. He graduated at the St. Petersburg Imperial Conservatory, where he studied under Anton Rubinstein.

In July 1891, he immigrated to the United States, first residing in La Porte, Indiana, and then in New Haven, Connecticut (where he gave his first American concert), before settling in New York.

== Selected works ==
- 1897: In The Flower Garden
- 1899: In the Russian Village
- 1911: 50 Jewish Folk Songs For Middle Voice And Piano Accompaniment Collected, Harmonized And Arranged By Platon Brounoff
