= Raymond Razafimbahiny =

- Born: January 1, 1919
- Died: January 1, 1963 (aged 44)
- Citizenship: Madagascar
- Occupations: Writer; Musician

Raymond Alphonse Razafimbahiny (1919–1963), also known as R.R. Majunga, was a musical artist and composer from Madagascar. He was known as one of the first bilingual composers in Madagascar, writing songs in both Malagasy and French. He wrote many songs in the style of “bà gasy” and “kalon’ny fahiny”. He came from a musical family. His niece was jazz singer Anna Razafimbahiny.
