= Elena Pucić-Sorkočević =

Countess Elena Pucić-Sorkočević, also Elena Pozza-Sorgo (c. 1784–1865) was the first female composer in the Republic of Ragusa (Dubrovnik), located in today's southern Croatia. She was born Elena Lujza Ranjina, and married Nikola Lucijan Pucić-Sorkočević (1772–1855). They had two children: Marina, who married Matej Natali and Lucijan Pucić-Sorkočević. After the fall of the Republic, musical performances were mostly held in private houses of the noble families.

Elena was the first female in Croatia whose compositions have been preserved She has a total of 6 completed compositions, one of them in sketches that are kept at the Franciscan monastery in Dubrovnik. Her compositions were not meant for concert works but rather epistles written to loved ones as expressions of her spirit.

== See also ==
- House of Pucić
- Sorkočević family
- Republic of Ragusa
