= Luis Antonio Ramírez =

Puerto Rican composer (1923-1995)

Luis Antonio Ramírez (10 February 1923 Santurce, Puerto Rico – 15 May 1995 San Juan, Puerto Rico) was a Puerto Rican composer.

== Formal education ==
From 1954 to 1957, Ramírez studied piano and harmony with Alfredo Romero in San Juan, Puerto Rico, graduating from the Conservatory of Music of Puerto Rico. From 1957 to 1964 Ramírez studied at the Madrid Royal Conservatory in Spain with the support of scholarship funds provided by the Institute of Puerto Rican Culture and the Puerto Rico Department of Education. At that institution he studied with composition with Cristóbal Halffter and Daniel Bravo and piano with Juan Molinari. He graduated from the conservatory in 1964.

== Career ==
From 1950 to 1957 he served as music director of WIPR, the Puerto Rican government's educational radio station. In 1968 he joined the faculty as professor of harmony and composition at the Conservatory of Music of Puerto Rico. His pupils included Esther Alejandro de León.

== Awards ==
In 1966 and 1968, the Ateneo Puertorriqueño bestowed upon Ramírez the Fine Arts Award. Ramírez is the recipient of several other awards and commissions from fine arts institutions that include the Instituto de Cultura Puertorriqueña and the Puerto Rico Symphony Orchestra.

== Selected works ==
Orchestral

- Fantasia sobre un mito antillano for trumpet, string orchestra, guitar and timpani (1971)
- Tres piezas breves (3 Short Pieces) (1972)
- Fragmentos (1973)

Chamber music

- Meditación a la memoria de Segundo Ruis Belvis for viola and piano (1973)

Piano

- Diez improvisaciones (10 Improvisations) (1971)
