= Mihi-ki-te-kapua =

New Zealand waiata composer

Mihi-ki-te-kapua (died c. 1872) was a New Zealand waiata composer, known as one of the greatest waiata composers from Ngati Ruapani and Tuhoe iwi. She was born in Ruatahuna, Bay of Plenty, New Zealand.

For much of her life, Mihi-ki-te-kapua lived at Te Matuahu, a settlement on the north shore of Lake Waikaremoana. Mihi-ki-te-kapua's waiata were inspired by her feelings of deep loneliness after members of her family moved away from home.
