= Andrejs Jurjāns =

Latvian composer and musicologist

- Born: September 30, 1856; Ērgļi, Governorate of Livonia, Russian Empire (now Latvia)
- Died: September 28, 1922 (aged 65); Riga, Latvia
- Education: St. Petersburg Conservatory
- Occupations: Composer, musicologist

Andrejs Jurjāns (September 30, 1856 – September 28, 1922) was a Latvian composer and musicologist. He was Latvia's first classical composer, having composed instrumental pieces and cantatas. Jurjāns also studied and collected more than 6000 pieces of Latvian folklore, among them 3000 songs, which he compiled in six books, called Latvju tautas mūzikas materiāli (Materials of Latvian Folk Music).

== Biography ==
Andrejs Jurjāns was born in 1856 in Ērgļi, Latvia. Active in music from a young age, Jurjāns decides to become a musician after participating as a choir singer in the First Latvian Song Festival in 1873. In 1875, he studied music at the St. Petersburg Conservatory, attending composition, organ and French horn classes with Nikolay Rimsky-Korsakov and German organists Louis Homilius and Friedrich Homilius.

In 1877, he published his first composition. From 1882 to 1916 Jurjāns taught music in the Russian Imperial Music Society Conservatory in Kharkiv, Ukraine. At the same time, he took an active part in Latvian musical life as a collector, researcher and arranger of national folk songs. His five-volume work, "Materials of the Latvian Folk Music" encompasses about 2,000 tunes. Jurjāns laid the foundation for further research in this area. Together with his brothers and musicians Juris, Pāvuls and Pēteris he regularly took part in the Latvian Song Festival as the Jurjāns' French horn quartet.

Around 1910 Jurjāns' hearing became weaker and in 1916 he retired from his teaching career. Seriously ill, in 1920 he returned to Latvia, where he died in 1922.

After the death of Jurjāns, the 6th part of his work was published posthumously by his brother Pāvuls.

== Compositions ==
Jurjāns composed 15 symphonic works, 5 vocal and instrumental works, as well as many solo songs, choir and folk songs. He is the first person to detail the Latvian folk song characteristics, thus attempting to turn the public's attention to common features in Latvian and Russian folklore. Jurjāns often used folk song intonations and fragments in his compositions. Jurjāns called on the new generation of Latvian composers to learn from Russian classical music, namely, from the work of composer Mikhail Glinka.

=== Selected folk songs ===
- "Pūt, vējiņi"
- "Čuči, mana līgaviņa"
- "Kur tu skriesi, vanadziņi"
- "Es karāi aiziedams"
- "Aiz upītes es uzaugu"
- "Tautu meita, melnacīte"
- "Stādīju ieviņu"
- "Tautiešam roku devu"
- "Kur gāji, puisīti", etc.

=== Selected choir songs ===
- "Nevis slinkojot un pūstot"
- "Lūk, roze zied"
- "Ozoldēli, liepas meitas"
- "Nakts dziesma"
- "Dievozolu trijotne", etc.

=== Symphonic music ===
- Symphonic allegro (1880)
- Latvju dejas (Latvian Dances) suite (1884)
- Tēvijai (To the Fatherland) cantata (1888)
