= Ernests Vīgners =

Latvian composer and conductor

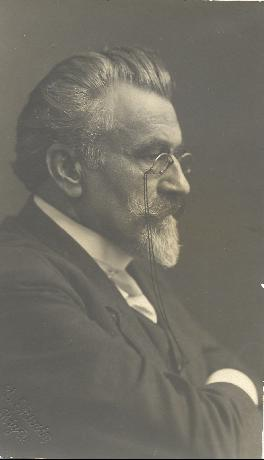
Vīgners in 1910.

Ernests Vīgners (18 January 1850 – 25 May 1933) was a Latvian composer and conductor.

== Biography ==
He graduated from Irlava Teachers' Seminary and went on to study with Rimsky-Korsakov.

His son Leonīds Vīgners was assistant conductor to Leo Blech 1937–1939, and later director of the Latvian National Opera 1944–49.

Vīgners received the Order of the Three Stars 3rd Class in 1926. He was interred at Riga Cemetery.
