= Ernests Birznieks-Upītis =

Latvian writer (1871–1960)

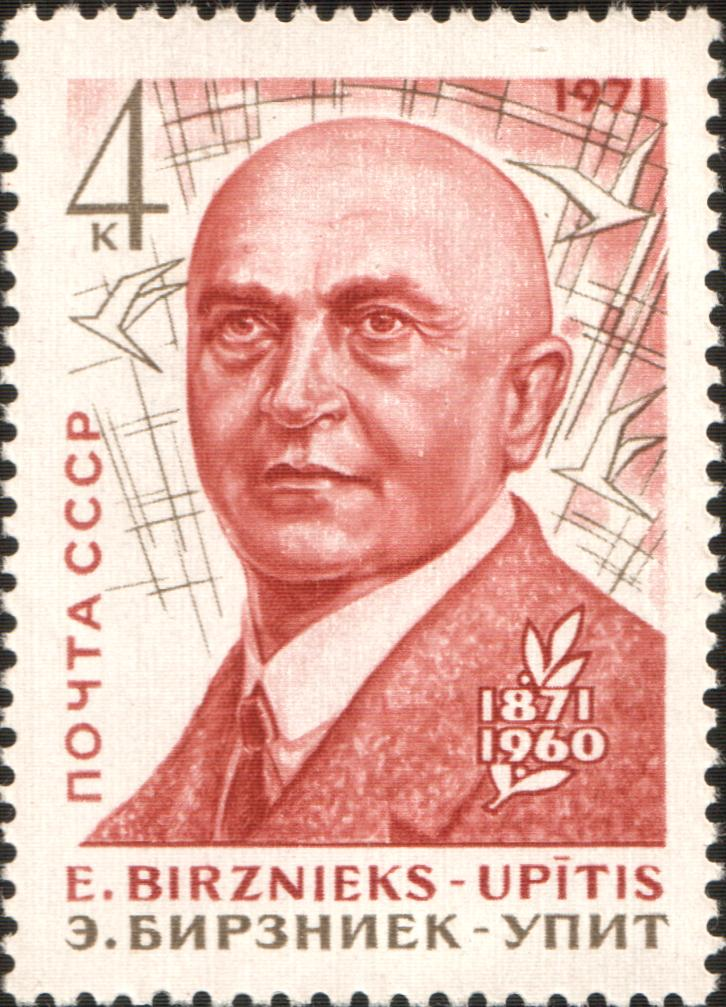
Ernests Birznieks-Upītis depicted on a Soviet Union postage stamp

Ernests Birznieks-Upītis (6 April 1871 – 30 December 1960) was a Latvian writer, translator and librarian.

== Biography ==
Birznieks-Upītis was born 6 April 1871, in Dzirciems. His father died in 1874. From 1880 to 1886, he studied at the Dzirciems Parish School. From 1887 to 1889, Birznieks-Upītis continued his studies at Tukums City School. Then he prepared for the teacher exams through self-study, which he passed as a teacher. In 1889, he returned to his native Dzirciems, where he worked as a home teacher. In 1891, his first work "Mother" was published in the "Baltijas Vēstnesī", as well as a translation of Ivan Krilov's fable. In 1892, he wrote the story "Soldier's Bride".

From 1893 to 1921, Birznieks-Upītis lived in Caucasus. After leaving his job as a home teacher, he worked as a library manager and as an oil company clerk. In 1900, Birznieks-Upītis' first story book "Upītis stories" was published, which ensured the author's popularity. In 1908, Ernests Birznieks-Upītis founded the book publishing house "Dzirciemnieki". By 1921, 67 books had been published, including Birznieks-Upītis' own works.

In 1912 and 1913, two more books by Birznieks-Upītis were published - "Morning" and "Before the Evening". In 1914, his "Gray Stone Stories" was published separately. In 1922, Ernests Birznieks-Upītis returned to Latvia. In the same year he started publishing the newspaper "Vārds". He also worked in the magazines "Domas", "Rainbow", "Youth Flows", "Small Flows of Youth". In 1924, his cycle of Caucasian stories "Caucasus Mountains" was published, and in 1927 "Caucasian Stories" was published in two parts. From 1922 to 1924, the "Pastariņš Trilogy" and "Nina's Fairy Tales" were published. From 1927 to 1934, he was the head of the Riga City Library Center.

During the German occupation of Latvia, Birznieks-Upītis lived with relatives in Zentene Parish. After World War II, they mainly lived in Lielupe, and he joined the Writers' Union.
