= Elda Cerrato =

Artist (1930–2023)

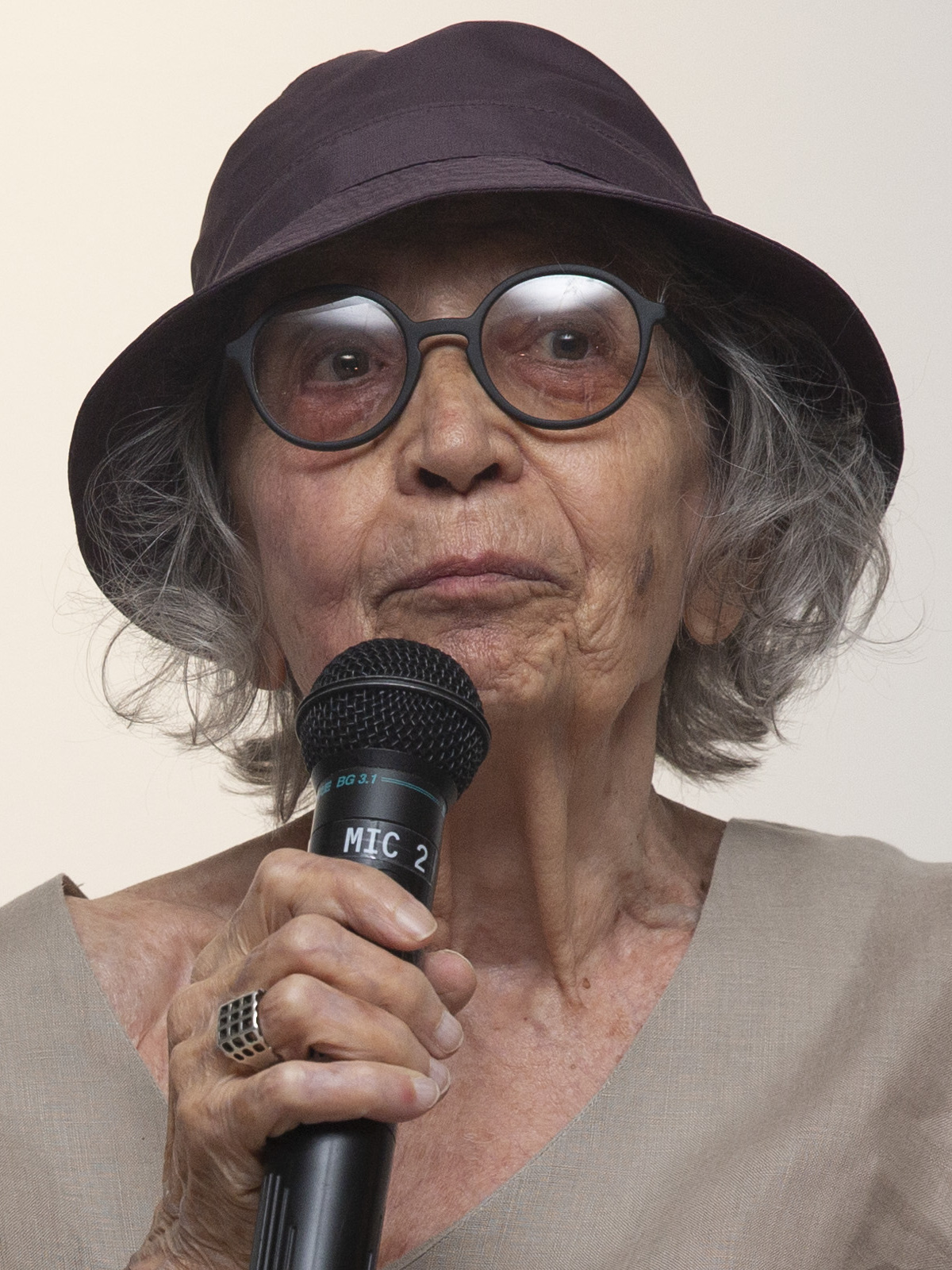
- Cerrato in 2019
- Born: 14 October 1930; Asti, Italy
- Died: 17 February 2023 (aged 92)

Elda Cerrato (14 October 1930 – 17 February 2023) was an Italian-born Argentine artist who was professor at the Universidad de Buenos Aires, and lifelong partner of composer Luis Zubillaga. Her work, characterized by a fusion of abstraction, political engagement, and metaphysical inquiry, positioned her as a significant figure in Latin American art. Cerrato died on 17 February 2023, at the age of 92.

== Early life and education ==
Born in Asti, Italy, in 1930, Cerrato migrated with her family to São Paulo first and then to Argentina in 1940, settling in Buenos Aires. This early experience of displacement informed her lifelong exploration of identity, territory, and belonging. She studied biochemistry and graduated in the field before later teaching at the University of Buenos Aires as a professor in the School of Architecture and the School of Arts, where she influenced generations of artists and thinkers.

== Artistic Practice ==
Cerrato's oeuvre encompasses painting, drawing, installation, and theoretical writing. Her early works in the 1960s and 1970s, such as the "Beta Being" series, delve into themes of cosmic energy and metaphysical entities, employing geometric abstraction and symbolic forms. These pieces reflect her interest in the intersection of science, spirituality, and art.

During the politically turbulent decades of the 1970s and 1980s in Argentina, Cerrato’s work assumed a more overtly political dimension. She approached social injustice, state violence, and collective memory through a systems-based conceptual language, incorporating maps, crowds, diagrams, and symbols of political movements into her compositions. In the 1990s and 2000s, this inquiry expanded toward planetary time, ecological transformation, and the interdependence of human, geological, and cosmic systems.

== Career and Exhibitions ==
Cerrato had 21 solo exhibitions in Argentina and abroad, including, the Buenos Aires Museum of Modern Art, Museo de Bellas Artes de Caracas and the Art Museum of the Americas, USA. From 1962, she participated in more than 150 group exhibitions with paintings, drawings, installations, performances in Americas and Europe; including eight International Biennials where she received awards. In 2024, her work was posthumously featured in the Venice Biennale's "Italians Everywhere" exhibition, highlighting her contributions to global art dialogues.

Cerrato was one of eight artists awarded the 2019 Premio Nacional a la Trayectoria Artística in Argentina. In 2022, Elda Cerrato received the prestigious Premio Velázquez.

Cerrato was Professor Consultant of Art at the Universidad de Buenos Aires and Academic Advisor to other universities in South America. Cerrato published articles, produced artists’s films, participated in radio programs, partaken as a member of academic and artist juries, and given conferences and seminars.

== Legacy ==
Elda Cerrato's integration of artistic practice with political and philosophical inquiry has left a lasting impact on contemporary art in Latin America. Her commitment to exploring the complexities of human existence, societal structures, and the cosmos continues to inspire artists and scholars alike. The Museo de Arte Moderno de Buenos Aires celebrated her extensive career with the exhibition Elda Cerrato: The Peoples’ Wonderful Day, recognizing her significant contributions to the construction of personal and collective memory. In her final years, Cerrato collaborated with her son, experimental filmmaker Luciano Zubillaga, on the audiovisual project Family Reunion (Reunión familiar). Plans for an associated exhibition included works by the composer Luis Zubillaga. An installation by Cerrato and Luciano Zubillaga, Okidanokh / Ocultamientos IV, part of the series Reunión Familiar: Recapitulaciones en el final de la vida, was presented at the 14th Shanghai Biennale in 2023.

Art historians and art critics who have written about her work include, Juan Calzadilla, Margarita D’Amico, Aldo Pellegrini, Rubén Astudillos, Marta Traba, Jorge Glusberg, Horacio Safons, Roberto Guevara, Sofía Imbert, Luis Lozada Sucre, Rosa Faccaro, César Magrini, Elsa Flores Ballesteros, Aldo Galli, Dora Fornaciari, Ernesto Ramallo, León Benarós, Jacobo Romano, Alfredo Andrés, Lelia Driven, Elena Oliveras, Raúl Santana, Alberto Collazo, Albino Diéguez Videla, Eduardo Carvallido, Julio Sapolnik, Bélgica Rodríguez, Moraima Guanipa, Rubén Wisotzki, Maritza Jiménez, Jorge López Anaya, and Ana Longoni.

== Exhibitions ==
- 1978 – ArteUna
- 1986 – Memory in Edges
- 1989 – The Eye and the Fissure - Arte Nuevo Gallery (Alvaro Castagnino)
- 1990 – Picturae Lapidis Volantis
- 1992 – Paintings. Acrylic on canvas paintings.
- 1993 – Painting and Metamorphosis
- 1993 – Cosmogonies
- 2021 – "El dia maravilloso de los pueblos". Museo de Arte Moderno con versión LSA.

== Bibliography ==
- Panorama de la Pintura Argentina, Aldo Pellegrini, 1967, Ed. Paidós, Bs. As.
- Horacio Safons, Elda Cerrato: Pintura y Metamorfosis, catálogo exposición, Sala Alternativa, 1993, Caracas
