= Alberto Soriano =

Argentine composer and ethnomusicologist

Alberto Soriano Thebas
- Born: February 5, 1915; Santiago del Estero, Argentina
- Died: October 16, 1981 (aged 66); Concepción del Uruguay, Argentina
- Occupations: Composer, musicologist

Alberto Soriano (5 February 1915 – 1981) was an Argentine composer and ethnomusicologist. He was born in Santiago del Estero.

== Background ==
Soriano was born on February 5, 1915, in Santiago del Estero, (Argentina), where his family had settled in temporarily. But it was in Bahia (Brazil) where he spent his childhood and early youth. He began his musical studies at an early age at the El Salvador Music Conservatory, becoming a distinguished pupil of Maestro Dante de Souza in violin and of Maestro Silvio Deolindo Froes in harmony, composition and counterpoint.

This academic formation, added to a permanent contact with the musical expressions of afro origins cultivated by the people of Bahia, left a mark on him for the rest of his life as a composer, also dedicated to ethno musicological investigation, music criticism, and teaching. He has written poetry in his early youth and published "Las cinco llegadas de la Madre d Agua" (Mother of Waters five arrivals), book than was prefaced by Jorge Amado and illustrated by Augusto Torres García.

The practice of music dictation and the participation in popular rites and festivities, allowed Soriano to write down more than one hundred "Magical Chants" while also gaining a deep knowledge of that telluric root which he would years later examine in depth in his works "Some of the ethno-musicological immanences" (University of the Republic, Montevideo, 1967) and "Three Auguric Prayers and Other Chants in Black Liturgy", (University of the Republic, Montevideo, 1968), as well as in his chair as professor of musical ethnology at the Faculty of Science and Humanities in Montevideo.

Research trips to the interior of Argentina, Brazil and finally Uruguay, where he settled from 1950 onwards, allowed him to widen his continental vision. This immersion into American cultural anthropology had influenced his music which, far from any superficial garment and in its apparent nakedness which may at times become disconcerting, is, according to the expressions of Colombian musicologist Andrés Pardo Tovar, "a sign of a temperament which, notwithstanding its originality, finds in the roots of vernacular tradition the most profound and true sources of his musical aesthetics".

In addition to many symphonic works, including concerts to soloist and orchestra and chorals, Soriano is author of two guitar concerts, (for five and for four guitars), a large collection of chamber music and many pieces for piano.

In an environment little prone to local musical creation, and almost hostile to it, Soriano leads a permanent and tenacious fight to make known Latin American music. Thus, in conversations held in Rio de Janeiro with Hector Villa Lobos, Camargo Guarnieri, Radamés Gnatali and the critics Jorge Andrade Murici and Enrico Nogueira France, the idea comes up to do Latin American music festivals, the first of which was held in Caracas in 1954, and then in 1957.

In 1958, Soriano undertakes, together with students of different disciplines at the Faculty of Science and Humanities of Montevideo, the Association of American Cultural Relations (ARCA), which took its motto from the proverb, "Better to light one candle than to curse the darkness." and it is in this spirit that the institution manages to publish an important series of booklets and the first serious collection of recordings dedicated to the works of Uruguayan composers. Among the instrumentalists of recognized prestige who have interpreted works by Alberto Soriano stand out pianists Hugo Balzo, Celia Roca, Cecilia Platero, Fanny Ingold, Wanda Lesmann and cellists Ernest Davies and Mstislav Rostropovich.

Works by Soriano have been performed under conductors of the stature of Jasha Horestein, who premiered his "Four Symphonic Rituals" in 1957 with the Symphony Orchestra of Venezuela; Yosif Conta, conductor of the symphony orchestra of Bucarest that interprets on 19 June 1964 "Three Symphonic Sketches on the life of Artigas.", and Kurt Masur who, in front of the Symphony Orchestra of Radio Berlin performs the "Prague Triptych" (1961).

As a result of his investigations about the man who lives in rural areas in relation to the world of sound around him, Alberto Soriano made more than 900 recordings, part of which he also used in his composition "Madrigals for the Walker", (1970), original assembly of bird songs, croaking of batrachians, voices of herdsmen and sheep-shearers, work where he undoubtedly combines his creative facet with the result of his work as investigator.

Alberto Soriano has written more than a hundred articles on musical ethnology subjects published in the Sunday supplement of the Uruguayan paper "El Dia, in "La Nación" from Buenos Aires and in specialized magazines as Polyfonia and Chilean Musical Magazine.

In the year 1976, his artistic links with countries at that time belonging to the Easter block, was reason enough to Uruguayan dictatorship to exile him to Argentine, Alberto Soriano spends his last days in Concepción del Uruguay, (Entre Ríos, Argentina), where he founds the Municipal School of Music and practices teaching at the "Justo José de Urquiza" High School until a few days before his death on October 16, 1981.

== Books ==
- Las cinco lllegadas de la Madre d Agua" (Mother of Waters five arrivals) Poseidón. Buenos Aires 1943
- "Esencialidad Musical: ritualismo y humanismo en este arte" Essential in music, ritual and humanism in that art) ABC Montevideo 1940
- "Algunas de las inmanencias etnomusicológicas" (Some of the ethno-musicological immanences) Universidad de la República, Montevideo, 1967
- "Tres rezos augúricos y otros cantares de la liturgia negra" /Three Auguric Prayers and Other Chants in Black Liturgy) Universidad de la República, Montevideo, 1968

== Discography ==
- Concert Nº 1 for five guitars and Concert Nº2 for four guitars. Olga Pierri ensemble ARCA FH001 1958. Digital CD 2010
- Four Symphonic Rituals.. Three Symphonic Sketches on the life of Artigas. Symphonic orchestra of Rumanian Radio and TV. Conductor Yosif Conta. Discos Qualiton, Q14005
- Prague Triptych. Radio Berlin Symphonic orchestra. Conductor Kurt Masur. Qualiton Q14009
- Sonata for violin and piano. Francisco Museti (violin), Celia Roca (piano) ARCA FH007
- Divertimento for bassoon and orchestra. Gerhard Hasse (bassoon), SODRE orchestra. Montevideo. ARCA FH 007
- Symphonic movement for the victims of Buchemwald. Leipzig Symphonic orchestra. Conductor Adolf Frits Guhl . Discos Qualiton Q1 4009
- Madrigals for the walker. Sound constructions. Discos Qualiton SQ14015

== Bibliography ==
- "Andante: Los pasos de un músico. Vida y obra de Alberto Soriano" Soriano, Mireya. Editorial Milenio, Spain, 2021
- "Musicos de Aquí". (Musicians from here) Six volumes work by several authors. CEMAU 1985 Centro de Estudios Musicales Argentino Uruguayo. (Argentinean Uruguayan Musical Research Center) The chapter about Alberto Soriano is in Volume !!, written by Lic. Elsa Sabatés.
- La música en el Uruguay. (Music in Uruguay). Lic. Mirtha Amarilla. El Eclipse. 2000.
- Acotaciones a la Sinfonía Los Rituales de Alberto Soriano. (Some comments about Los Rituales Symphony by Alberto Soriano) Ricardo Nahiosi . ARCA 1956
- Indice general alfabético suplemento dominical del diario "El Día". (General alphabetical index Sunday supplement "El Día"). Luis Alberto Musso Ambrosi. Ministerio de Educación y Cultura. Biblioteca Nacional de Montevideo. 1997. (Ministry of Education and Culture. National Library. Montevideo)
- Con el compositor Alberto Soriano.(With the composer Alberto Soriano) Revista Musical ilustrada Ritmo. Madrid. España Nº 335 mar 1963
- Breve introducción a la música hispanoamericana. (Short introduction to Hispano American music) Ritmo Nº 335. June 1963
- El idioma de los pájaros. (The language of birds) Revista Periscopio. (Magazine Periscopio) Buenos Aires. Argentina. Nº11. Diciembre 1969

Free scores by Alberto Soriano at the International Music Score Library Project (IMSLP)
