= Discos Qualiton =

- Parent company: Fonema S.A.
- Founded: 1961
- Founder: Nelson Montes-Bradley; Ivan Cosentino; Nora Raffo; Carlos Melero
- Genre: Various
- Country of origin: Argentina
- Location: Buenos Aires

Discos Qualiton was a record label, published by the recording studio Fonema S.A. A garage experiment in Rosario, Argentina in 1961, Qualiton would later become a major independent record label influencing a generation of artists, writers, musicians, poets, and filmmakers.

== Early days ==
The first attempts by Nelson Montes-Bradley (1935-2023) and Ivan Cosentino (1935-2017) to produce and publish vinyl records in Argentina was made under the umbrella of Fondo Cultural, a firm based in Rosario, and incorporated in Buenos Aires. Fondo Cultural later adopted the name Qualiton, which eventually led to a close relationship with the homonymous state-owned record company in Hungary during the Communist years.

Joaquín Rodrigo's "Cantares de los pajes de la nao" by Coro Estable de Rosario, conducted by Cristián Hernández Larguía, was Qualiton's first recording in 1961. Soon, the idea of producing other choruses became a perfect venue to establish the company in the local arena. Limited editions, of no more than 300 units, were quickly absorbed amongst the members of the chorus ensemble and their relatives. By 1965, the early catalog of Discos Qualiton produced by Fondo Cultural, was beginning to develop into a greater ordeal. Fondo Cultural became extinct and Fonema incorporated thus allowing Nora Raffo and Carlos Melero, newest members of the Qualiton team, to join in the corporation.

The following years were mostly dedicated to producing classical music with a particular emphasis in baroque and colonial periods in Latin America. Also worth mentioning are the recordings of ethnographic music harvested in the field and gathered under the label Serie del Conocimiento and the unique recordings of literary works known as Juglaría.

== The 1970s ==
By the late 1960s, the record label had already relocated from Rosario to Buenos Aires and expanded its catalog. New investors were seduced by the idea of creating a major independent label. Curt von Simpson and Gertrudis Moser joined Fonema executive leadership providing the needed contacts with local banks (namely Banco Oddone). During this period of expansion Take One, a state-of-the-art 24-channel recording studio was built to specs. The console was manufactured by Solidyne and the studio acoustics was designed by Oscar Bonello. Take one, which would eventually become a landmark of the record industry was located at Fonema's HQ on Perú 375 in Buenos Aires historical district known as Monserrat The original concept of a small and family orientated garage experiment born in Rosario had grown out of proportion. However, by 1976, a military putsch, led by Jorge Rafael Videla, ousted Argentine president Isabel Perón making life quite difficult for the arts at large, and in particular for domestic labels linked to the previous years of social unrest. On October 22, 1976, an unsigned article denouncing "Marxist Penetration" was published in the newspaper La Razón. The clipping inspired a paramilitary group to target the studios of Discos Qualiton, then located in Calle Perú 365, Buenos Aires, and also members of the board of directors. The artists involved in the actual creation of the songs reproduced in the LP as denounced in the article published by La Razón were forced into exile. Author Vico Ciliberti fled to Rome. The final days of Discos Qualiton came about in 1978.

Only a few complete collections of Discos Qualiton and other labels associated with Fonema and Fondo Cultural have survived and are available in a handful of libraries, private collections, and research institutes throughout Europe and the US. It is worth noticing that up to 1977, the artistic direction of Discos Qualiton was mostly the result of the expertise of Ivan Cosentino as a musician and recording engineer, while the publishing, editorial presentation, production, and marketing was carried out by Nelson Montes-Bradley.

== Catalogue ==

According to what has been reconstructed from catalogs, newspaper articles and vinyl records available from private collectors and currently being sold at auctions or through internet services. Qualiton was one of five labels published by Fonema in Buenos Aires, Argentina. Other labels released by Fonema were: Colección Privada (Private Stock), Serie del Conocimiento (Knowledge Series), Archivo Colonial de América Latina (The Latin American Colonial Archive) and Juglaría. Each new album released by Fonema was identified with an alphanumeric code in one of the five labels. Some of the sequences in the catalog are interrupted and this is perhaps due perhaps to the fact the albums were either pending release or that we have not yet been able to identify its contents. In order to facilitate research, we present each album (LP) in the following categories.

=== Qualiton ===
Inside Label on Qualiton LP: QH-2005

- QH-2002:Homenaje a Pablo Bondorevsky. Side A: "Petruchka" suite for piano (sic) by Igor Stravinsky; "Scherzo No. 3 in C♯ minor, Op. 39" by Frédéric Chopin B: "Partita in B major" by Johann Sebastian Bach. Recorded live in 1967. Executive Producer Nora Raffo, Editor: Nelson Montes, Artistic Editor Ivan R. Cosentino. With Notes by Carlos Suffern. Illustration by Isaías Nougués, printed by Imprenta López.Produced by Fondo Cultural S.R.L.Vinyl pressed by CBS Records, Buenos Aires.
- QH-2006: Roberto Lara, guitarra. Guitarist Roberto Lara plays from a repertoire of Argentine composers: Carlos Guastavino, Pelaia, A. Alemann, Julián Aguirre, Gómez Carrillo and Abel Fleury. Roberto Lara, guitar; Eduardo A. Alemann, recorder.
- QH-2008: Música para niños, Vol.1. (Music For Children, Vol. 1) This is the first in a series of four volumes. Each volume incorporates a repertoire exhibiting a wide variety of cultural traditions, and languages. Performer: Conjunto Pro-Musica de Rosario. Conductor: Christián Hernández Larguía.
- QH-2009: Canto 4. Canto 4 being the title of the album, and the name by which the vocal quartet originated in Rosario was known. Canto 4 was produced by Nora Raffo, founding member of Discos Qualiton. Cover photo by OKY. Cover Design by José Luis Bollea also a member of Canto 4. The album included a compilation of Negro spirituals and other popular themes from the Americas such as: "Cap´n Go Side Track Your Train"; "Maracatú"; "Entraña de árbol"; "Go Tell It on the Mountain": "Cançao para ninar meu bem"; "All My Trials"; "Black Girl"; "Lord If I Got My Ticket"; "Creciente de nueve lunas"; "Berimbao"; "Chacarera del fusilado"; "It isn't nice"; "José Junco".
- QH-2010: Brahms: Marienlieder. Vocal Works by Johannes Brahms: Marienlieder "Songs For Mary", for mixed chorus Op. 22 (1860); Sieben Lieder (Seven Songs), for mixed chorus Op. 62 (1874). Coro de Cámara de Córdoba. Conductor: César Ferreyra.
- SQH-2011:El habitante del silencio. Remo Pignoni, piano. Includes the following works for piano by Remo Pignoni: "Pa'la Dorita"; "Triunfo nochero"; "Por el Sur"; "Pa'que más"; "Mi quena te llama"; "Llegándome a ella"; "De angora"; "Pa'zurdo y La siguiente"; "La cromática"; "Pal'Ñato; Pa'la Lilucha"; "Como queriendo"; "Pa'su apero"; "Coyita mía"; "En séptima"; "Herencia"; "Chumbeao".
- QH-2012:El canto de Rolando Valladares. Rolando Valladares by himself. Includes: "Canto a la Telesita"; "Vidala del lapacho"; "Zamba del carrero"; "Vidala del llanto"; "Tarco viejo"; "Canción de las cantinas"; "Zamba del romero"; "Por Amaicha"; "Subo"; "Coplas de la luna".
- SQH-2013:Canciones para Don Quijote. Popular Spanish songs inspired in Don Quijote de la Mancha by Miguel de Cervantes, Don Quixote. Poems by: María Paseyro. Music by: Tomás Luzian. Performed by: María Gondell, soprano; Ulises Castelli, baritone; Eduardo Frasson, guitar.
- SQH-2014: Quinteto Huayna Sumaj. Huayna Sumaj Quintet. Perla Estequín, soprano; Elba Estequín, mezzo-soprano; Ricky Acosta, tenor; César Sotelo, barítono; Luis Gentilini, bajo, arreglos y dirección. Popular South American folk tunes by various artist from Latin America. "Días de Mayo". "Guarden la luna"; "Para cantarle a mi gente"; "La navidad de Juanito Laguna"; "Tonadas de Manuel Rodríguez"; "Vidala del último día"; "Malambo"; "Juanito Laguna remonta un barrilete"; "Ramón el potrerizo"; "El camino del pueblo"; "Fiesta de guardar"; "Canto a la Telesita".
- SQH-2015:Los 4 de Chile, Quartet with Héctor and Humberto Devauchelle. A selection of Chilean popular songs: "Por la calle del Rey arriba"; "Romance de barco y junco"; "Sencillas palabras de mi madre"; "Pequeña elegía"; "Palabras al hijo futuro"; "Para que no me olvides"; "Del cielo a tu corazón"; "Remordimiento"; "Despedida"; "Poema de la tierra". Under License from Discos Asfona, Santiago, Chile.
- QH-2016:Canciones desde una prisión. Rolando Alarcón (voice and guitar). Protest songs during the times of deposed president Salvador Allende: "Coplas del oficio"; "La pregunta"; "Coplas del toro vuelto"; "El verde no muere solo"; "Canciones desde un calabozo"; "Coplas del pié"; "Ha muerto Elba Susana"; "He venido desde lejos"; "Pobrecita la llave". Under License by Discos Hemisferio, Montevideo, Uruguay.
- QH-2017: El camino hacia la muerte del Viejo Reales. Soundtrack album of the homonymous documentary film by Gerardo Vallejos, member of Grupo Cine Liberación.
- QH-2018: La fuerza del diálogo. Norma Peralta (voice) and Naldo Labrín (guitar). Latin American folk songs: "Pacundina"; "Irene"; "José Dolores"; "Carcará"; "Oh, pajarillo que cantas"; "El Fiero"; "Zamba de la pena"; "Alegres eran mis ojos"; "A una paloma"; "Sirilla de la Candelaria"; "Zamba del indio Serapio"; "Canción del Centauro".
- SQH-2019: De aquí y de ahora. Palermo Trío (tango): 9 de Julio; Corralera; Sentimiento tanguero; Jogo bonito; Sensitivo; El choclo; Canaro en País; De aquí y de ahora; Flores negras; Imaginación; Mi redención; Responso.
- SQH-2020: Ayer me dijeron Negro (Just Yesterday I was called a Negro) by Roberto Darvin (voice and guitar). Includes the following songs: Canoero; Ayer me dijeron Negro; Zamba de tu piel; Por casualidad; Barlovento; Noctuno de amor y playa; Jacinto Vera; Tema de la Pimpa; Canto marinero; Guitarra. Estereofónico. Published by Qualiton under license from Hemiferio Records, Montevideo, Uruguay.
- SQH-2021: Música para niños, Vol. 2. (Music For Children, Vol. 2) Conjunto Pro-Musica de Rosario. Conductor: Christián Hernández Larguía.
- SQH-2022: Canción por Nicolás. (A Song for Nicolás) by the Quintet Huayra Puka. Includes: Canción por Nicolás; Canto isleño; Ashpa Sumaj; Te vas de mi; Duérmase lucerito; Que se vengan los chicos; La amorosa; La cancionera; Sueño y charango; Vidala doble; Corrientes cambá; Cuyana; El gato de la calesita.
- SQH-2023: Corazón del país. (Country's Heart) by Contracanto (ensemble). Includes: Estudiantes de Mayo; Mama Angustia; A la mina no voy; Canción por Nicolás; Cuando un amigo se va; Me matan si no trabajo; Canción de un peso; Tania; Canción del Jacinto; Canción para el fusil y la flor; Sabatina; Me digo a veces pensando.
- SQH-2024: América canta, Vol.1. Doce canciones latinoamericanas y un poema.; Quinteto Huayra Puka; Trío de 4; Rolando Alarcón; Isidro Contreras; Norma Peralta; Contracanto; Quinteto Huayna Sumaj; Canto 4; Yamandú Palacios; Roberto Darvin. Estereofónico.
- SQH-2025: Cantar de pájaros. Trío de 4. Canción para el fusil y la flor; Sabás; Ay, Mama Inés; Zamba vieja; Ay, Tituy; Sóngoro cosongo; Juancito caminador; Canción de Pablo; Ay, Soledad; Te recuerdo Amanda; Cuento de aquella tarde; Canción (de la Cantata Popular Santa María de Iquique). Estereofónico.
- SQH-2026: ¡Viva Chile, mierda!. Eleven Latin American Songs and One Poem. Includes compositions by Violeta Parra, Ángel Parra, Carlos Puebla, Daniel Viglietti, Roberto Darvin, Rolando Alarcón and others. Includes Fernando Alegría's poem "Viva Chile, mierda!". Published under license from Hemisferio Records, Montevideo, Uruguay.
- SQH-2027: Del amor y la libertad (Love and Liberty) by Taco Muñoz (Voice and Guitar). Taco Muñoz embodied a fusion of protest and revolutionary song with a soft rock approach. Includes: La rosa roja; Está herido en la guerrilla; Lucha compañero; Vamos, Patria; Tema de la Libertad; Rojo amanecer; Juan Libertad; Yo era un tipo amargado; La dulzura; Lo que pasará; Candombe libre; De cómo hicieron el amor por primera vez. Estereofónico, editado bajo licencia de Hemisferio/ Uruguay.
- SQH-2028: Tawantinsuyu. The album title corresponds to the name of a native Bolivian ensemble produced by Luis María Cosenza. Engineered by Jorge DaSilva. Recorded at Take One Studios. Cover design by Pablo Barragán. Some of the tracks are in native Quechua, others in Spanish. The album includes the songs: "Chojñapata de yungas"; "Moxeñada"; "Cacharpa-ya del indio"; "Esperanza del indio": "Cuando salí de Bolivia"; "Procesión"; "Zampoñas"; "Cueca a Bolivia"; "Tarkeada"; "De Bolivia a la Argentina".
- SQH-2029: Canciones para hacer pensar a los chicos (trad. Songs to Help the Children Think) by Mirta Ciliberti. Seventeen Songs for children. This album was instrumental in the final days of Discos Qualiton. The military regime ruling Argentina, ordered the destruction of the master, and authors Mirta and Vico Ciliberti were forced into exiled in Italy.
- SQH-2030. Para el tiempo de cosecha... (trad. For Harvest Time) Quintet Huayra Puka. Includes: "Póngale por las hileras"; "Cofre de sueños"; "Debajo de la morera"; "Mi abuelito tenía un reloj"; "Vaya pa'que sepa"; "Por un viejo muerto"; "Romance en Taragüi"; "Si supieras tu"; "Remolinos"; "Yo tengo una copla riojana". Foreword by Luis María Cosenza. Cover design by Pablo Barragán.
- SQH-2031: Budapest by Night Sándor Lakatos y su orquesta gitana. In Stereo. Published under License Agreement with Qualiton of Hungary.
- SQH-2032. Homenaje (Tribute). Conjunto Contracanto. The ensable was born in Rosario with a repertoire of mostly protest songs. This LP included the following tracks: "Que se vayan ellos"; "Niño yutero"; "Arana"; "Porqué los pobres"; "Las estaciones"; "Coplas de mi país"; "Homenaje"; "La muralla"; "Historia simple"; "Ayer me dijeron negro"; "Un niño en cada hombre"; "La amanecida". Cover design by Oscar Díaz.
- SQH-2033: El sorprendente Moog. (The unbelievable Moog) Ben Callaghan & Co. La gaviota infelíz; Otra vez solo; Sundust y otros temas melódicos. Estereofónico, editado bajo licencia de Qualiton Hungría.
- SQH-2034: El cuarteto del Chivo Borraro. Live Blues con amague; Minor Key; Lover Man; Africa. Horacio Chivo Borraro, saxo tenor; Fernando Gelbard, piano; Jorge López Ruiz, contrabajo; Carlos Pocho Lapouble, batería. Técnico de grabación: Osvaldo Acedo; producción: Fernando Gelbard. Grabado el 3 de noviembre de 1970.
- SQH-2035: Música para niños, Vol.3. (Music For Children, Vol. 3) Conjunto Pro-Musica de Rosario. Conductor: Christián Hernández Larguía.
- SQH-2036: El Trío + Tango. Guitar Trio. Includes: El último organito; El viejo ciego; Quedémonos aquí; Recuerdos; Nieblas del Riachuelo; Los mareados; Tú; Garúa; Boedo; A Homero; Mi refugio; La última curda. Néstor Gabetta, voz; Carlos Padula, guitarra; Mario Travesaro, guitarra; Justino Distéfano, contrabajo; Alfredo Llosá, flauta y violín.
- SQH-2037: Locomotiv GT. Locomotiv was a Hungarian rock and roll emerging in Budapest during the Communist era. Published under License Agreement with Qualiton of Hungary
- SQH-2038: Criollo sudamericano. Isidro Contreras (voice and cuatro). Includes: La vida envuelta en el aire; Criollo sudamericano; Rosalinda; La noche que yo robé; A Simón Bolivar y otros temas. Isidro Contreras, voz y cuatro; R. Fernández Braque, guitarra; Dany Boy, órgano; F. Della Maggiore, percusión; R. Heinz, bajo. Estereofónico.
- SQH-2040: Canción para mi madre tierra. (A Song For Mother Earth) by Tito Segura. Segura was a folk singer from Patagonia plays and sings several tunes of his native Argentina. Includes: Chupar y cantar; Con el alma por Santiago; Mi casi tonada; Por un ratito; Un adiós a Pablo; Allá en las Orcadas; Criollita santiagueña; Sueño de un niño tren; Milonga para pensar; Hilachita del Norte; Felina Mercedes Luna; Viene clareando.
- SQH-2041: América Libre: El país de la verdad. "Free America: A Nation of Truth". Includes: No es América; Duerme, negrito; Tema 40; Natalio Ruiz, el hombrecito de sombrero gris; El país de la verdad; A veces to do es así de simple; Gaby toca el saxo; Canción de cuna sin niño; Caramelos de miel y pan de ayer; Vamos llegando; Una canción más de amor. Carlos Piégari, voz y guitarra; Ricardo Bruno, voz; Irene Canggiano, voz; Rolando Fortich, bajo, guitarra y piano; Horacio Mica, guitarra y voz; Miguel Fiannaca, percusión; Jorge Fortich, píano; Luis María Cosenza, guitarra. Producción: Luis María Cosenza.
- SQH-2042: Los folkloristas. Música de América Latina. Eleven traditional tunes from Chile, México, Perú, Cuba, Bolivia, Venezuela, Argentina and Ecuador. Los Folkloristas was a popular ensemble of traditional music from México whose members were; Rubén Ortiz, Leonor Lara, José Ávila, René Villanueva, Gerardo Támez, María Elena Torres y Adrián Nieto. Published by Qualiton under license from Difusora del Folklore (Discos Pueblo), Mexico.
- SQH-2045: Situaciones. Rodolfo Haerle. Rare inclusion in Discos Qualiton catalogue of a rock performer. The album was engineered by Jorge DaSilva and Litto Nebbia. Associate producer Luis María Cosenza. Published under license from Serie Melopea. Rodolfo Haerle, guitar and vocals. Litto Nebbia, Fender piano, Moog, drums, bass, organ, harmónica, whistle and choir. Néstor Astarita, drums. Daniel Homer, bass. Jorge González, electric bass. Alejandro De Michelle and Miguel Angel Erauskin, choruses. The album included the tracks: Natural, es natural; Lugares comunes; El héroe; La clave de hoy, cierre; Crónicas de la madrugada; Respuesta: Otra vuelta fugaz; Estar lejos no es igual; Situaciones. Cover design by Pablo Barragán.
- SQH-2046: Canto y clarificación. by Rodolfo Alchourrón. Produced by Luis María Cosenza. The album was engineered by Jorge Da Silva and recorded at Netto Studios in Buenos Aires. Cover designed by Pablo Barragán. Includes the tracks: Con mis juguetes saldré a vivir; Al fin entendí; Y componer una canción: Retrosprección; Argentina 75; Furia del amanecer; Del to do vos; Chacarera TV; Telelito; Compongamos la mentira; Me quedo aquí; Aquí y ahora; Flores, colores y rayos de sol. Adicional performing by Marcelo San Juan, Rodolfo Mederos, Manuel Manolo Juarez, Norberto Minichilo, Emilio Valle, Patricia Clark, Raúl Parentella. Engineered by Jorge DaSilva at Estudios Netto. January 1976.
- SQH-2047: Mensaje a la ciudad. Alberto Garralda. Alberto Garralda, bandoneón; Bartolomé Palermo, guitar; Rodolfo Almar, vocals and orchestra. Engineered by Jorge Da Silva. Recorded at Take1 Studio. Cover design by Pablo Barragán. Included the tracks: Mensaje a la ciudad; Caminito; Ninguna; Danzarín; La reja; Cafetín de Buenos Aires; Trenzas; Mimí Pinzón; Mi redención; Vieja luna; Uno; Latido de Buenos Aires. Alberto Garralda, bandoneón; Bartolomé Palermo, guitarra; Eduardo Walczak, Reynaldo Michele, Fernando Suarez Paz, Mario Abramovich, Tito Besprovan, y Nito Farace, violines; Abraham Selecson, viola; José Bragato, cello; Osvaldo Tarantino, piano; Kicho Díaz, bajo. Canta Rodolfo Almar. Técnico de grabación: Jorge DaSilva. 1977. Estereofónico.
- SQH-2048: Los folkloristas. Música de América Latina, vol.2. Twelve traditional tunes from Bolivia, México, Paraguay, Argentina, Brasil, Perú y Ecuador. Grabación: Ing.Víctor Rapoport. Recorded in Mexico. Published by Qualiton under license from Discos Pueblo.
- SQH-2052: Música para niños, Vol.4 (Music for Children, Vol. 4) Conjunto Pro-Musica de Rosario. Conductor: Christián Hernández Larguía.

=== Choral recordings ===
- CM-1015 Cantares de los pajes de la Nao. (1964) Coro Estable de Rosario. Director: Christián Hernández Larguía. Original artwork (cover and pamphlet) by Mele Bruniard.
- CM-1016: Música popular Argentina (Argentine Popular Music). (1964) Coral Femenino de San Justo. Director: Roberto Saccente. Portada y grabado interior de Luís Seoane.
- CM-1017: Gloria, Vivaldi. Coro Polifónico de San Justo, órgano y conjunto instrumental de cámara. Conductor: Roberto Saccente. Original artwork (cover and pamphlet) by Mario Loza.
- CM-1018; Claudio Monteverdi: Lagrime d'amante al sepolcro dell´amata (Sestina) [Lover's tears at the tomb of the beloved]. All'ora i pastori tutti. Coro de Cámara del Collegium Musicum de Buenos Aires. Conductor: Juan Schultis. Original artwork (cover and pamphlet) by Víctor Rebuffo.
- CM-1019: Coro Esloveno Gallus. Ciclo de música sacra eslovena. Conductor: Dr. Julio Savelli. The cover portrays a traditional Slovenian motif.
- CM-1020: Coro Femenino de la Escuela del Magisterio. Songs and Romances from Germany and Argentina. Conductor: José Felipe Vallesi. Original artwork (cover and pamphlet) by de Ricardo Scilipoli.
- CM-1021: Coro de Cámara de Córdoba. Missa Quarti Toni de Tomás Luis de Victoria y Misa de William Byrd (fragmentos). Conductor: César Ferreira. Cover Designed by Luis Saavedra.
- CM-1022: "Coral Femenino de San Justo". Traditional and popular songs from Argentina and around the world. Conductor: Roberto Saccente. Cover designed and original artwork within by Isaías Nougués (h).
- CM-1023: Coro de Cadetes de la Escuela Naval Militar. Canciones marineras y populares del repertorio universal. Conductor: Rafael Urbiztondo. Cover designed by Emilio Biggeri.
- CM-1024: "Folklore musical esloveno". Coro Esloveno Gallus. Conductor: Dr. Julio Savelli. Portada, diseño tradicional esloveno.
- CM-1025: Coral Femenino de San Justo. Misa en Si bemol Mayor de Antonio Lotti; Tres madrigales Op.8, de Alicia Terzian; Sainte Marie Magdelaine, de Vincent d'Indy. Conductor: Roberto Saccente. Iris Fabrizzi, órgano; Eduardo Calcagno, piano y solistas vocales.
- SCM-1026: Vivimos en nuestras montañas. Niños y jóvenes cantores de Bariloche. Canciones populares del repertorio universal. Grabado en el Centro Atómico de San Carlos de Bariloche. Conjunto de flautas dulces. Conductor: Luck Kralj de Jerman.
- CM-1027: Coro Popular Universitario "José Luis Ramírez Urtasun. Vintage live recordings of works by Gabrieli, Jannequin, Guerrero, Debussy, Häendel and other popular tunes from Catalonia, the U.S.A., Galicia, Argentina, and the Basque Country. Made possible through a grant from the Fondo Nacional de las Artes. Conductor: José Luis Rodríguez Urtasun.
- CM-1028: Gianmbattista Pergolesi: Stabat Mater. Coro Juvenil de Haedo, del Instituto Alte. Guillermo Brown. Grabación documental del señor Héctor Burd realizada en la Catedral de San Carlos de Bariloche el 30 de marzo de 1972. Órgano, Oscar Alessi. Solistas: Adriana Burt, soprano; Silvia Cambiaso, contralto; María Eva Felini, mezzo. Conductor: Edgardo Aradas.
- QI-4000: Irma Costanzo, guitarra. Works by Heitor Villa-Lobos; Héctor Ayala; Abel Carlevaro. Irma Costanzo, guitar.
- QI-4001: Música argentina contemporánea. Works by César Franchisena; Luis Zubillaga; Rodolfo Arízaga; Silvano Picchi. Héctor Rubio, piano; Adelma Eva Gómez, organ.
- QI-4002: Música Argentina. Presencia N°6 “Jeromita Linares” by Carlos Guastavino; “Triste pampeano” by Alberto Ginastera; “Cifra y malambo” by Abel Fleury; “Canción N°2” by Julián Aguirre; “Norteña” by Jorge Gómez Crespo; “Metamorfosis romántica” by Iván Rene Cosentino. Roberto Lara, guitar and the Arcangelo Corelli String Quartet.
- QI-4003: Música medieval y renacentista. Conjunto Pro Musica de Rosario. Conductor: Cristián Hernández Larguía.
- QI-4004: Martirio de Santa Olalla and two other works by Rodolfo Arízaga: "Cantatas humanas" and "Sonetos de la pena". The Qualiton Ensemble. Conductor: Teodoro Fuchs. Contralto: Noemí Souza.
- QI-4005: Alberto Soriano."Cuatro rituales sinfónicosand "Tres esquemas sinfónicos sobre la vida de Artigas" by Alberto Soriano. Symphony Orchestra of the Romanian State Radio and Television. Conductor: Iosif Conta. Premio América. ARC de la Universidad de la República. Montevideo, Uruguay.
- QI-4006: Ginastera-López Buchardo-Guastavino. "Sonata para piano", "Danza de la moza donosa" and "Malambo" by Alberto Ginastera; "Campera" and "Bailecito" by Carlos López Buchardo and "Bailecito" by Carlos Guastavino. Pía Sebastiani, piano
- QI-4008: Música Española del Siglo de Oro (Music from the Spanish Golden Age). Works by Juan del Encina; Enrique de Valderrábanos; Luis de Milán; Cristóbal Morales; Mateo Flecha; Francisco de la Torre; Diego de Ortiz; Alonso Lobo; Juan Vásquez; Juan Ponce and various anonymous works. Conjunto Pro Musica de Rosario, Conductor: Cristián Hernández Larguía.
- QI-4009: Tríptico de Praga (Prague Triptych). Side A: Suite para orquesta. 1. Antífonas del puente Carlos; 2. Scherzino en la calle de los alquimistas y Canto a las torres; 3. Ronda infantil para un Viejo Castillo. By the Berlin Radio Symphony Orchestra. Conductor: Kurt Masur. Side B: "Sonata for violin and piano" 1. Allegretto expresivo; 2. Cantabile; 3. Rondó-Scherzo. Francisco J. Musetti (piano) and Celia Rocce de Musetti (violin). "Tiempo Sinfónico a los Caídos en Buchenwald", Leipzig Symphony Orchestra. Conductor: Adolf Fritz Guhl. Cover design by: Pablo Barragán. Dated 1970.
- SQI-4010: Schumann-Szymanowski Sonata op. 22 by Robert Schumann; Preludio Op. 1 by Karol Szymanowski. Pía Sebastiani, piano
- SQI-4011: Luis Gianneo. Three works by Luis Gianneo: "Sonata para violin y piano (1935); "Cinco piezas para violín y piano" (1942) and "Música para niños. Diez piezas para piano". Brunilda Gianneo, violin; Celia Gianneo, piano
- SQI-4012: Johannes Brahms: Sonata en Fa Menor, Op. 5 by Johannes Brahms. (1971) Pía Sebastiani, piano. Allegro Maestoso; Andante Espressivo; Scherzo; Intermezzo; Allegro Moderato (Sonata in F Minor, Op. 5) (J. Brahms)
- SQI-4013: Robert Schumann. "Sonata Op. 16" Kreisleriana" by Robert Schumann. Manuel Rego, piano
- SQI 4014: Roberto Lara interpreta a Abel Fleury. Short pieces for guitar by Abel Fleury. Roberto Lara, guitar. Album licensed by Qualiton to Lyrichord Discs, US.
- SQI-4015: Cánticos para el caminante. Construcciones sonoras. Maestro Alberto Soriano recorded the sounds of Nature. It was a life-time experience: frogs, birds and wind. These sounds were later organized and edited to create a remarkable piece of music. Premio América. ARC de la Universidad de la República. Montevideo, Uruguay.
- SQI-4016: Béla Bartók: The Wooden Prince. Complete version of Béla Bartók's "The Wooden Prince" Op. 13. (1913). Budapest Philharmonic Orchestra. Conductor: János Ferencsik. Published under license from Qualiton, Hungary.
- SQI-4017: Albinoni-Vivaldi-Mozart-Leng. "Sonata in G Minor, Op.2 No.6 " by Tomaso Albinoni; "Concerto In A Minor For Oboe and Orchestra" by Antonio Vivaldi; "Divertimento in D Major KV 136" by Wolfgang Amadeus Mozart; "Andante for strings" by Alfonso Leng. Orquesta de Cámara de la Universidad Católica de Chile. Conductor: Fernando Rosas. Enrique
- SQI-4018: Música Argentina. Contemporary works from various Argentine composers. "Presencia N°6 "Jeromita Linares" by Carlos Guastavino. Roberto Lara, guitar; "Contemplación y Danza" by Astor Piazzolla. Martín Tow, clarinet; "Milonga" by Alberto Williams; "Lamento quichua" and "Criolla" by Luis Gianneo; "Impresiones de la Puna" by Alberto Ginastera. Domingo Rullo, flute. Solistas de Buenos Aires. Conductor: Alberto Epelbaum.
- SQI-4019: Navidad del barroco-Antiguos noëls franceses-Corales alemanes de Navidad. Conjunto Pro Arte de Flautas Dulces; Coro Nacional de Niños, Conductor: Vilma Gorini; The Qualiton Ensemble; Coro Arsis, Conductor: Eduardo Alonso Stier. Mario Videla, organ and harpsichord.
- SQI-4020: La flauta dulce. Historia y música. The Recorder: History and Music. Medieval, baroque and contemporary tunes for recorder. Conjunto Pro Arte de Flautas Dulces.
- SQI-4021: Guitarra. Short pieces for guitar, from the 16th Century to contemporary. Roberto Lara, guitar
- SQI-4022: "Schuman-Schubert-Arizaga". "Märchenerz"hlungen, Op. 132" (Fairy Tales, Op. 132) by Robert Schumann; "Sonata in A minor for Arpeggione and Piano, D. 821" by Franz Schubert and "Ciaccona for Viola" by Rodolfo Arízaga. Tomas Tichauer, viola; Mónica Cosachov, piano and Luis Rossi, clarinet. Recorded in 1972.
- SQI-4023: William Byrd. Three compositions by William Byrd: "Misa a cinco voces"; "Obras para órgano", "Danzas para clave". Interpreter: Coro de Cámara de Córdoba. Mario Videla, clave.
- SQI-4024: "Vivaldi-Danzi-Mozart". Works by Antonio Vivaldi, Franz Danzi, Wolfgang Amadeus Mozart. Quinteto de Vientos del Mozarteum Argentino.
- SQI-4025: "Suite Hispana". Several pieces for guitar and string quartet by Spanish composers: "Suite Hispana" by Manuel Del Olmo; "Mallorca" by Isaac Albéniz; "Lamento" by Eduardo Lopez-Chavarri; "Tiento antiguo" by Joaquín Rodrigo; "Boceto andaluz" by Regino Sainz de la Maza. All but "Suite hispana" were played by Roberto Lara, guitar; "Suite Hispana" was recorded with Roberto Lara in guitar and The Buenos Aires String Quartet.
- SQI-4026: Franz Liszt, "Requiem" by Franz Liszt. The Hungarian People's Army Chorus and Soloists. S. Margitay, organ. Conductor: János Ferencsik.
- SQI-4027: La guerra doméstica. Der Häusliche Krieg (Die Verschworenen), Singspiel, also known as "The Conspirators " or "The Domestic War" by Franz Schubert. Akademie Kammerchor and Wiener Simphoniker Orchestra. Conductor: Ferdinand Grossmann.
- SQI-4028: "Música para dos guitarras". Music for two guitars by Francis B. Cutting; Fernando Sor; Christian Scheidler; Mario Castelnuovo-Tedesco. Duo Pujadas – Labrouve.
- SQI-4029: "Schumann-Poulenc". "Fantasy Pieces, Op. 12" by Robert Schumann; "Napoli"; "Three Perpetual Movements" and "Two Novelettes," by Francis Poulenc. Manuel Rego, piano.
- SQI-4030: "Antiguos aires y danzas inglesas". Works for clave by Giles Farnaby; Peter Philips; Martin Peerson; Thomas Morley; John Dowland; William Byrd; John Bull; J. Monday and anonymous. Arnolda Hirsch, clave.
- SQI-4031: "Música en la casa del Marqués de Sobremonte", is the first on a series of recordings at the museum known as the House of the Marqués de Sobremonte by the Coro de Cámara de Córdoba conducted by César Ferreyra; the Conjunto de Instrumentos Antiguos del Goethe Institute conducted by Raúl Alvarellos, Mario Videla organ and harpsichord, and soloists in guitar, viola, viola da gamba, clave and espineta.
- SQI-4032: Galuppi-Clementi-Scriabin."Dodici sonate per cembalo" by Baldassare Galuppi; "Sonata en F Minor, Op. 26 No. 12" by Muzio Clementi and Preludes Op. 11: "Prelude No. 4 in E minor", "Prelude No. 6 in B minor", "Prelude No. 10 in C sharp minor", "Prelude No. 17 in A-flat mayor" "Prelude No. 20 in C minor"; "Two Poems Op. 69, No.1 and 2", "Two Poems Op. 71" and "Five Preludes Op.74" by Alexander Scriabin. Manuel Rego, piano.
- SQI-4033: Domenico Zipoli. Complete Works for Organ by Domenico Zipoli from the book Sonate d'intavolatura per organo e cimbalo (cymbal). Includes only the first part (Per Organo) of the Sonata d'Intavolatura. Recorded on time period pipe organ, one located in the Buenos Aires Metropolitan Cathedral, and a second located at the Museum-House of the Marqués de Sobremonte, where "Música en la casa del Marqués de Sobremonte" had previously been recorded (SQI-4031). This album was recorded on the colonial pipe organ at the Buenos Aires Metropolitan Cathedral and at the Museo Sobremonte, in Córdoba using also a colonial pipe organ. Mario Videla, organ.
- SQI-4034: Música en la Edad Media. Music in the Middle Ages. Conjunto Pro Musica de Rosario
- SQI-4035: Mendelssohn. Songs Without Words by Felix Mendelssohn. Manuel Rego, piano
- SQI-4036: Joseph Haydn. "Missa Solemnis" "Harmoniemesse" by Joseph Haydn. Akademie Kammerchor and Vienna State Opera Orchestra. Conductor: G. Barati. Album licensed to Qualiton by Lyrichord Discs, US.
- SQI-4037: Schubert, "Mass No. 4 in C major, D452.". Akademie Kammerchor. Viena State Opera Orchestra. Conductor: George Barati. Album licensed to Qualiton by Lyrichrd Discs, US.
- SQI-4038: Música Colonial Latinoamericana. Works by Ignacio Celoniat; Juan de Araujo (Sucre, Bolivia); F. Gómez da Rocha (Minas Gerais, Brazil); Anónimo (Cusco, Peru); Tomás de Torrejón y Velasco (Cusco, Peru): Hernando Franco (Mexico); Juan de Llenas (México) y Emerico Lobo de Mesquita (Minas Gerais). Recorded in 1973 at the Buenos Aires Metropolitan Cathedral. Coro de la Fundación Ars Musicalis, Orquesta de Cámara y solistas. Conductor: Pbro. Jesús Gabriel Segade.
- SQI-4039: János Vitéz.. A musical by Pongrác Kacsóh adapted fragments from the poem "János Vitéz" by Sándor Petőfi. Coro de la Radio y Televisión Húngara. Conductor: Cecilia Vajda. Orquesta de la Opera del Estado Húngaro y cantantes solistas. Conductor: Ervin Lukács. Published under license from Qualiton, Hungary.
- SQI-4040: Manuel Rego, piano. “Aquel Buenos Aires” (tango, vals criollo and milonga) by Pedro Sáenz; “Tangos” (1942): “Evocación”, “Llorón”, “Compadrón”, “Milonguero” y “Nostálgico” by Juan José Castro. “Fantasía Bética” by Manuel de Falla; “Impresiones íntimas”: No.5, “Pájaro Triste”, N°7 “Cuna”, N°8 “Secreto” and N°9 “Gitano”. Int. Manuel Rego, piano
- SQI-4041: King Stephen, Hungary's first Benefactor, Op.117 and The Ruins Of Athens, Op.113. Text by August von Kotzebue, Score by Ludwig van Beethoven. Coro de la Radio y Televisión Húngaras. Soloists: Margit László (soprano) y Sándor Nagy (barítono), Maestro de Coro: Ferenc Sapszon. Orquesta Filarmónica de Budapest, Conductor: Géza Oberfrank. Published under license of Qualiton, Hungary.
- SQI-4042: Obras vocales I. By Ferenc Liszt. "Hymne de l'enfant a son réveil"; "Tantum ergo": "O salutaris hostia I"; "Salmo 137"; "Sanct Christoph Legende" "O heilige Nacht" "Quasi cedrus (Mariengarten) and "Pater Noster". Gábor Lehotka, organ; Eva Andor, soprano; Hédi Lubik, arpa; Margit Lászlo, soprano; Péter Komios, violin; György Miklos, piano and József Réti, tenor. Coro Femenino de Györ. Coro de la Agrupación Folklórica del Estado Húngaro. Conductor: Miklos Szabo. Published under license of Qualiton, Hungary.
- SQI-4043: Arias para tenor. By Wolfgang Amadeus Mozart. "¡Misero! ¿O sogno o son desto? K.431"; "Rondó: Per pietá non recercarte. K.420"; "Sí mostra la sorte. K.203"; "Sí al labbro mio non credi. K.295"; "Con cossequío, con rispeto. K.210". József Réti, tenor. Orquesta de la Asociación Filarmónica de Budapest. Conductor: Antal Jancsovics. Published under license of Qualiton, Hungary.
- SQI-4044: Cesar Frank. Serguei Rachmaninoff. "Variaciones Sinfónicas para piano y orquesta" by César Franck; "Concierto N°2 en do menor, for piano and orchestra, Op.18". Orquesta Filarmónica de Budapest. Conductor: Miklos Lukács. Gábor Gabos, piano. Published under license of Qualiton, Hungary.
- SQI-4045/4046: Vivaldi, Juditha Triumphans. "Juditha Triumphans", Oratorio by Antonio Vivaldi. Coro Madrigal de Budapest, Maestro de Coro: Gy. Czigány. Cantantes solistas. Orquesta del Estado Húngaro. Conductor: Ferenc Szekeres. Two records set in a box with notes. Published under license of Qualiton, Hungary.
- SQI-4047: Ferenc Liszt, Symphonic Poems. "Symphonic Poem N°2: Tasso, Lamento E Trionfo" and "Symphonic Poem N°2 R.420 Hungaria" by Franz Liszt. Hungarian State Orchestra. Conductor: János Ferencsik. Published under license of Qualiton, Hungary.
- SQI-4048: Haydn. "Concierto para piano y orquesta en re Mayor, Hob: XVIII: 11" and "Sinfonía en mi bemol Mayor N°43, Mercurio", by Joseph Haydn. Orquesta de Cámara Húngara. Conductor: Vilmos Tátrai. Gábor Gabos, piano. Publish under license of Qualiton, Hungary.
- SQI-4049: Michel Blavet, Four Sonata for flauta & contínuo by Michel Blavet. Sonata No. 1 in G major "L'Henriette" (adagio, allegro, aria I and 2, presto); Sonata No. 2 in D minor, "La Vibrai" (andante, allemande, gavote –Les caquete-, sarabande, finale); Sonata No. 3 in E minor, "L'Dhérouville" (adagio, allemande, rondeau –L'insinuante–, tambourin I and II –Le Mondorgue–gigue); Sonata No. 4 in G minor, "La Lumagne" (adagio, allemande, sicilienne, presto, allegro vivace –Le Lutin–). Enzo Giecco (flute); Mario Videla (harpshichord); Leo Viola (violoncello).
- SQI-4050: Miguel Angel Estrella, piano. "Six short preludes". Chorale from the Notebook for Anna Magdalena Bach, (Wer nur den lieben Gott läßt walten), by Johann Sebastian Bach. "Prelude and Fugue No.2 C minor" from The Well-Tempered Clavier Vol. II by Johann Sebastian Bach; "Fantasy and Sonata in C minor: a- Fantasy K.475; b- Sonata K.457 (molto allegro, adagio, allegro assai) " by Wolfgang Amadeus Mozart
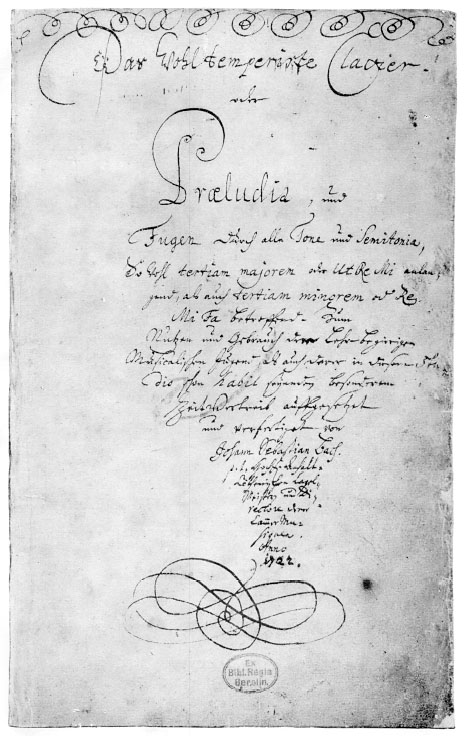
  Title page of Das Wohltemperierte Klavier
- SQI-4051: Muzio Clementi. Complete Piano Works, vol. 1. Previously unpublished sonata in A flat major; Sonatas del Op.1, No. 1 to 6. Aldo Antognazzi (piano).
- SQI-4052: El niño Mozart. (The Early Sonatas) Six sonatas for flute and harpsichord. Violin Sonata No. 5 in B flat major, K10, Violin Sonata No. 6 in G major, K11, Violin Sonata No. 7 in A major K12, Flute Sonata No. 4 in F major, K13, Violin Sonata No. 9 in C major, K14, Flute Sonata No. 6 in B flat major, K15. This set of six sonatas was written in 1764. From April of that year until August 1765 the eight-year-old Mozart was in London with his family. Enzo Giecco (flute); Mario Videla (harpsichord). Includes an insert brochure with commentary by Lic. Julio Palacio.
- SQI-4053:"English Renaissance Music" (Música inglesa del Renacimiento). Conjunto Pro Musica de Rosario. Conductor: Cristián Hernández Larguía. Madrigals, Ballets, Airs and Dances. Includes the following themes: 1. My bonnie lass she smileth/ Thomas Morley; 2. Now is the month of maying/ Thomas Morley; 3. Fire, fire my heart/ Thomas Morley; 4. Flow my tears/ John Dowland; 5. Kemp's gigue/ Anónimo s. XVI-XVII; 6. Of all the birds/ John Bartlett; 7. Rest sweet nimphs/ Francis Pilkington; 8. Adieu, sweet Amaryllis/ John Wilbye; 9. See, see the shepherd's Queen/ Thomas Tomkins; 10. Hey, trolly lolly lo!/ Anónimo s. XV-XVI; 11. My lady Carey's dompe/ Anónimo c. 1500; 12. A Robin/ Robert Cornysh; 13. Pastime in good company/ Anónimo s. XV-XVI; 14. Lullaby, my sweet little baby/ William Byrd; 15. The carman's whistle/ William Byrd; 16. Four-Part Mass (fragments)/ William Byrd. Cover design: Pablo Barragán.
- SQI-4054: Tomás Luis de Victoria, Francisco Guerrero y obras de Cristóbal Morales, F. de las Infantas y Juan Esquivel. "Misa Quarti Toni" by Tomás Luis de Victoria; "Magnificat (Modus 1) " by Francisco Guerrero; "Gloria in excelsis Deo" and "Veni, Domine" by Juan Esquivel; "O Crux ave, spes unica" by Cristóbal Morales and "O patriarcha pauperum" by F. de las Infantas. Coro de Cámara de Córdoba. Conductor: César Ferreyra.
- SQI-4055: The Recorder in France. Tunes from the Middle Age, Renaissance and Barroque, by Adam de la Halle, Johannes Ghiselin, Josquin des Prez, Clément Janequin, F. Attaignant, François Caroubel and other anonymous tunes. Conjunto Pro Arte de Flautas Dulces. Carlos López Puccio, viola da gamba. Antonio Spiller, violón. Oscar Bazán, basson. Gabriel Pérsico, recorder soloist. Mario Videla, harpsichord. Notes by Mario Videla.
- SQI-4057: Música cortesana en Polonia, Alemania y España, de los siglos XVI y XVII. Works by Nicolaj de Cracovia, Antonio Scandellus, Heinrich Isaac, Alonso de Mudarra, Antonio de Cabezón, Nicolaus Gombert and anonymous as well as from the Song Book of Upsala and the Song Book of Palacio. Conjunto Pro Musica de Rosario. Conductor: Cristián Hernández Larguía. Assistant conductor: Susana Imbert. Notes by Gerardo V. Huseby
- SQI-4059: Doménico Zipoli. "Misa en fa Mayor para coro, solistas, cuerdas y bajo contínuo" (Kyrie, Gloria, Credo, Sanctus). Coro de la Fundación Ars Musicalis. Qualiton Ensemble. Conductor: Pbro. Jesús Gabriel Segade. "Sonata en la Mayor para violín y bajo contínuo". Haydée Francia, violín; Mario Videla, organ. "Cantata para solista y bajo contínuo, Dell'offese a vendicarmi". Margarita Zimmermann, contralto. Claudio Baraviera, violoncello. Mario Videla, clave. Notes by Francisco Curt Lange.
- SQI-4060: The Recorder in England. Tunes by John Dunstable, Henry VIII, Thomas Morley, William Byrd, John Dowland, John Baston, Benjamin Britten and anonymous. Conjunto Pro Arte de Flautas Dulces from Buenos Aires. Carlos López Puccio, viola da gamba. Gabriel Pérsico, flute and percussion. Antonio Spiller, violin. Osvaldo D'Amore, violin. Leo Viola, violoncello. Eva Cantor, lute. Notes by Mario Videla.
- SQI.4062: Domenico Zipoli. Complete works for harpsichord. "Suite I, in B minor" (harpsichord). "Suite II, in G minor (clavichord). "Suite III, in C Major" (harpsichord). "Suite IV, in D Minor" (clavichord). "Partite, in la menor" (harpsichord). "Partite in C Major" (harpsichord). Mario Videla, harpsichord and clavicord (Both instruments manufactured by Kurt Wittmayer, luthier Germany). Notes by Francisco Kurt Lange
- SQI-4065: Mónica Cosachov-Tomás Tichauer-Luis Rossi. "Sonata in G Minor for viola y clive" by Henry Eccles. "Sonata in B Flat Major for clarinet and harpsichord, by Johann Baptist Wanhal. Two of the "Eight Pieces for Clarinet, Viola and Piano, Op.83" by Max Bruch. "Three Pieces for Clarinet solo" and "Elegía (1944)" by Igor Stravinsky. Tomás Tichauer, viola. Mónica Cosachov, harpsichord y piano. Luis Rossi, clarinet. Notes by Alberto G. Bellucci.
- SQI-4066/4067: Tenores wagnerianos del pasado. "Wagnerian Tenors of The Past" Registros de Ernest van Dyck, Ernst Graus, Francisco Viñas Doral, Jacques Urdus, Erik Anton Julius Schmedes, Karel Burian, Heinrich Knote, Giuseppe Borgatti, Otto Wolf, Leo Slezak, Charles Rousselière, Fritz Soot, Walther Kirchhoff, Richard Schubert, Rudolf Laubenthal, Gotthelf Pistor, Lauritz Melchior, Isidoro de Fagoaga, Franz Völker, Torsten Ralf, Max Lorenz and Set Svanholm. Two-LP set. Selection and notes by Eduardo Arnosi.
- SQI-4068: Música de la Catedral de Lima. Recorded at the Cathedral of Lima. Ancient works by Pedro Durán, Manuel Gaytán y Arteaga, José de Orejón y Aparicio, Estacio Lacerna, Fabián García Pacheco, Joseph de Torres y Martínez Bravo and Martín Francisco de Cruzelaegui. Coro de la Fundación Ars Musicalis. The Qualiton Ensemble. Conductor: Pbro. Jesús Gabriel Segade. Ana María González, soprano. Roberto Britos, tenor. Leo Viola, violoncello. Mario Videla, harpsichord and organ. Notes by Carmen García Muñóz.
- SQI-4076: The Little Book of Anna Magdalena Bach. Twenty-two vocal and instrumental pieces from The Little Book of Anna Magdalena Bach. Coro Bach, Conductor: Antonio Russo. Ana María González, soprano. Mario Videla, harpsichord, clavichord and organ. Notes by Juan Pedro Franze.
- SQI-4077: Historia temática de la guitarra, vol. 1. Works by Adrian Le Roy, Francisco Tárrega, Jean-Baptiste Bésard, Carlo Calvi, Domenico Pellegrini, Francis Poulenc, O. Rosatti, Johann Sebastian Bach, E. Sand, Niccolò Paganini, Fernando Ferandiére, Johann Kaspar Mertz, Fernando Sor, Matteo Caracassi, Federico Moreno Torroba, Ramón Noble O. and anonymous. Roberto Lara, guitar.
- SQI-4079: "Oscar Vetre, piano". Robert Schumann, Estudios sinfónicos Op.13; Juan José Castro, Tocata; Sergei Prokofiev, Sonata #3 Op.28 (1917). First Prize "Juan José Castro 1977". Produced by the Goethe Institute of Buenos Aires in association with Qualiton-Fonema. Sponsored by Lufthansa. Cover design by Pablo Barragán.
- SQI-4080: Jorge Bergaglio, piano. Ludwig van Beethoven. Sonata #31 Op.110 in A flat Mayor; Claude Debussy: La isla alegre; Sergei Prokofiev: Sonata #7 Op.33 (1942). Third Prize "Juan José Castro 1977". Produced by the Goethe Institute of Buenos Aires in association with Qualiton-Fonema. Sponsored by Lufthansa. Cover design by Pablo Barragán.
- DPE-002: Discos Qualiton used the initials DPE (departamento de Productos Especiales) to signal a new series of especial products catering institutions and organizations. DPE-002 was made to order for the "Premio Fundación Gillette para jóvenes concertistas de guitarra clásica". The winners of that particular contest were each assigned a different side of the LP. Side A: Eduardo Elías Isaac, guitar: Carlos Guastavino, Sonata #1 for guitar; Johann Sebastian Bach: Prelude for lute from Suite #4; Alexandre Tansman: Prelude from the Suite Cavatina. Side B: Hugo Abel Enrique, guitar. M. Castelnuovo Tedesco: Sonata. Engineered by Amilcar Gilavert. Cover design by Pablo Barragán. (Published by Departamento de Productos Especiales de Fonema S.A.)
- SQI-4082: Navidad con el Pro Musica. Twenty-one Christmas themes from around the world. Conjunto Pro Musica de Rosario. Conductor: Cristián Hernández Larguía. Conductor Ass., Susana Imbern.

=== Colección privada ===
Private Stock: A total of five titles were released by Fonema S.A. under Colección Privada (trans. Private Stock). The concept behind the idea of a private stock was to subscribe to a limited number of members, initially set at 500 in a clear reference to the Fortune 500. The idea of exclusivity was becoming popular in Argentina at the time also through the different programs promoted by credit cards such as Diners Club and American Express. The logo revealed a key and the number 500 in reference to the privacy held by the exclusive members. Colección Privada initially announced it was going to release on LP every month.

- CP-000 Il Mondo della luna. Opera cómica en dos actos, by Joseph Haydn. Soloists and Chamber Orchestra of Munich. Conductor: Johannes Weissenbach. Walter Hagner, bass. Kurt Schwert, baritone. Albert Gassner, tenor. Willibald Lidner, tenor buffo. Friedel Schneider, soprano. Hanne Muench, mezzo-soprano. Karl Kreile, tenor. Karl Schwert, baritone. Published under license of Lyrichord Discs, US. Notes by Ernesto Epstein.
- CP-001: Johannes Brahms, motets Op. 29, 74 y 110. "Motette Op.74 N°2: O Heiland, reiß' die Himmel auf". "Motette Op. 29 N°1: Es ist das Heil uns kommen her". "Motete Op.29 N°2: Schaffe in mir, Gott, ein reines Herz; Verwirf mich nicht von deinem Angesicht; Tröste mich wieder mit deiner Hilfe". "Motette Op. 74 N°1: Warum ist das Licht gegeben dem Mühseligen; Lasset uns unser Herz samt den Händen aufheben; Siehe, wir preisen selig, die erduldet haben; Choral: Mit Fried und Freud ich fahr dahin"; "Motete Op.110: Ich aber bin elend (SATB-SATB); Ach, arme Welt (SATB-coral; Wenn wir in höchsten Nöten sein (SATB-SATB). The Whikehart Chorale. Conductor: Lewis E. Whikehart. Published under license of Lyrichord Discs, US. Notes by José Antonio Gallo.
- CP-002: Alban Berg. "Concierto para violín, piano y 13 instrumentos de viento", by Alban Berg. Viennese Wind Ensemble. Conductor: Harold Byrns. Ivry Gitlis, violin. Charlotte Zelka, piano; "Cuatro canciones Op.2" y "Siete canciones antiguas". Catherine Rowe, soprano. Benjamin Tupas, piano. Published under license of Lyrichord Discs. Notes by Margarita Fernández.
- CP-003: John Dowland. Canciones de amor y amistad. Trece canciones by John Dowland para coro, solistas vocales y laúd. The Saltire Singers. Patricia Clark, soprano. Jean Allister, contralto. Edgar Fleet, tenor. Frederick Westcott, bass. Desmond, Dupre, lute. Published under license of Lyrichord Discs, US. Notes by Gerardo B. Huseby.
- CP-005: Arnold Schoenberg. The Book of the Hanging Gardens (:Das Buch der hängenden Gärten) Op. 15" by Arnold Schoenberg (based on poems by Stephan George). Belva Kibler, mezzo-soprano. Gerhard Albersheim, piano. Published under license of Lyrichord Discs, US. Notes by Juan Pedro Franze

=== Balkanton ===
A total of three titles were produced and released by Fonema S.A. parent company of Discos Qualiton, under the label Balkanton. The titles were edited by Planeta S.A. a firm owned by Eduardo Eurnekian and Miguel Levy, under license by Balkanton, Bulgaria.

- BCA -1422: "Sergei Prokofiev". Concertos Nos 1 and 2 for violin and orchestra. Stoika Milanova, violin. Symphonic Orchestra of the Bulgarian Radio & Television. Conductor: Vassil Stefanov. Cover Design by Adalberto Díaz Domínguez.
- BCA -1493: Johannes Brahms Johannes Brahms violin sonata No. 1, Op. 78 and Number 2 in A Major Op. 100. Stoika Milanova, violin, and Dora Milanova, piano. Cover Design by Adalberto Díaz Domínguez.
- BCA -1604: Ancient Russian Songs. Bulgarian Choir Svetoslav Obretenov. Conductor: Giorgi Robev. Cober Design by Adalberto Díaz Domínguez.

=== Juglaría ===
Spoken Word: Authors such as Federico García Lorca, Dylan Thomas, Jacques Prévert or local icon Tejada Gómez were either publish in their own voice or read and interpreted by others. At least eleven titles (a total of twelve LPs), were released under this category. Halfway through the series, the ID numbers that identify each title in a catalog were changed. The denomination "QH" corresponds to the original Qualiton, the following known as the series that begin with "JC" and "JQ" were inscribed in the attempt by Fonema to create label exclusively for literary works. The later was known as Juglaría label produced by Nelson Montes-Bradley .

- QH-2000/2001: Federico García Lorca. Canciones y Poemas. Spanish popular songs harvested by Federico García Lorca, performed by Clara Esteves, soprano and Roberto Lara, guitar; and a selection of poems by the same read by Lorenzo Varela. The linen wrapped box containing two LP's was designed by Luís Seoane and included a 28-page booklet illustrated with xylography works by the Galician master. The box-set also included a fine reproduction of an original and previously unpublished drawing by Federico García Lorca.
- QH-2003: Diego Rivera Speaking (On the social commitment of the artist). Rare interview with Diego Rivera, published under license of Caedmon Audio, USA.
- QH-2004/JQ 001: Poeta de la legua. A selection of poems from and read by Armando Tejada Gómez. Includes poems from the book "Tonadas para usar". Notes by Hamlet Lima Quintana. Recorded at Studio Lagos. Cover design by Enrique Sobisch. The LP was presented at the Teatro Payró on Monday September 8.
- QH-2005: Hamlet Lima Quintana, poemas. ¨Taller del resentido¨ and ¨La muerte y los presagios¨. A selection of poem by Hamlet Lima Quintana in his own voice. Recorded at Instituto Bernasconi. Cover design by Biglione. Foreword by Fernando Alonso.
- QH-2007: Sonopoemas del Horizonte by Armando Tejada Gómez. Includes the poems: "Antiguo labrador"; "Doña Florencia Arboleda"; "Muchacha"; "La Juana Robles llorando"; "Tonada de tu piel"; "La verdadera muerte del compadre"; "Hay un niño en la calle";"El barco""; "Coplera del prisionero"; "Coplera de Juan"; "Coplera del viento"; "Nochedanza de la Matilde Luna"; "Incendio del compadre". Notes by the author. Cover designed by J. Nougués
- JQ-002 Cantoral de mi país al Sur. Recorded by Armando Tejada Gómez. Moncho Mieres (Guitar). Includes the poems: "Hombre de gris"; "Memoria del grillo"; "Muchacho de setiembre"; "El himno a una voz"; "Un grito de ida y vuelta"; "La barca" "Cantoral en su sitio"; "Historia de tu ausencia"; "Crónica de la lluvia"; "Manifiesto del horizonte" and "La creciente". Preliminary notes by Nira Etchenique. Cover designed by Sigfredo Pastor.
- JC-004: Dylan Thomas Reading. A selection of works by Dylan Thomas read by Dylan Thomas. Includes: "A Child's Christmas in Wales" (short-story); "Fern Hill"; "Do Not Go Gentle into That Good Night". "In The White Giant's Thigh"; "Ballad of the Long-legged Bait"; "Ceremony After a Fire Raid". Published under license of Caedmon Audio, USA.
- JC-005: Les fleurs du mal. A selection of works by Charles Baudelaire's classic Les fleurs du mal. In French, read by Louis Jourdan, and Eva Le Gallienne. Published under license from Caedmon Audio, USA.
- JQ-007: Luis Franco. A selection of Luis Franco's works read by the author himself. Includes the following poems: "Insondable raíz"; "Suma"; "Canción del circo del mar"; "Long ago"; "Nocturno del duo inmóvil"; "Falus"; "Plenilunio"; "Mar nuestro"; El llora-sangre está llorando"; "Coplas solitas"; "El zapatero"; "Conmemoración sin pausa"; "Danza del yaguareté"; "La Cruz del Sur"; "Conjunción"; "Madre ceniza"; Indagación del hombre" and "Primavera de Alicia".
- JH-008: Greffet dit Jacques Prévert. Greffet dit Jean de La Fontaine. Eight poems from Jacques Prévert's "Paroles" and seven fables by La Fontaine read by Phillippe Greffet in its original French version. Published under license of Hemisferio, Uruguay.
- JQ-009: Federico García Lorca. "Oda a Walt Whitman"; "Oficina y denuncia" and "Oda al Rey de Harlem" from "Poeta en Nueva York" and other poems read by Lorenzo Varela a poet himself exiled in Buenos Aires from the Spanish Civil War. Recorded in 1965.
- JA-010: El Mio Cid. Fragments of the original medieval epic: Cantar de Mio Cid; from a Castilian version written by Pedro Salinas. Read and recorded on the voice of Roberto Parada. Published under license of Asfona, Chile.
- JQ-011: Nuestro paisano José de San Martín. Recording of a compilation of texts by José de San Martín recited by Norberto Bianco. Curator: Luis Alberto Frontera.

=== Serie del Conocimiento ===
(Knowledge Series) World Music:

- QF-3000/3005: Folklore Musical y Música Folklórica Argentina. Set containing six LPs with recordings harvested in the fields noting each instrument and its singularities. Record #1. "Charango, Caja y Bombo"; Record #2. "Aerófonos del Noroeste"; Record #3. "Acordeón y violin"; Record #4. "Guitarra"; Record #5. "Conjuntos populares". A Sixth LP was added to the collection namely "Música de los aborígenes" introducing the sounds of Toba, Mataco, Chorotis, Chiriguano and Ranquel. The recording of the latter on the fields was a work for hire by Jorge Novati e Irma Ruiz on Fonema's request. The set came with explanatory literature in the format of a book in Spanish, French, and English, AND with abundant illustrations, index, and bibliography. The box also included 36 color slides (35mm) and a handy slid-viewer. The first edition also came with an introductory note by Augusto Raúl Cortazar and was entirely purchased by the (Fondo Nacional de las Artes). The set was well received in Academia. Frank Gillis, Associate Director at the Archive of Traditional Music. Folklore Institute. Indiana University judged this recording in the following terms: "We know that they are authentic and of high quality, and thus we are very pleased to add them to our collections (...) They are very attractive and very well documented" Awards: "Primer premio colección documental didáctica en el disco" Sexto Festival del Disco Internacional, Mar del Plata, Argentina (1967).
- QF-3006: Música del Mato Grosso, Brazil. Recordings of Edward M. Weyer, Jr. of music from the Camayura, Chavante, Kayabi, Iwalipeti, and Caboclo peoples. Published under license of Lyrichord Discs, US.
- QF-3008: The Indians of the Gran Chaco. (Música etnográfica. Grupos Mataco y Choroti). One 12" 33 rpm dic. Field recordings (1975). Published in 1976 with jacket notes by Jorge Novati and Irma Ruiz. Published under Qualiton's license in the US by Lyrichord Discs.
- QF-3009/10: Los primitivos instrumentos musicales del hombre. (Menkind Early Musical Instruments). Set of two LPs with notes. Contemporary recordings of primitive forms of sounds (35 examples) from Asia, Africa, America, and Europe. Compilation by Curt Sachs. Published in 1976, under license of Lyrichord Discs, US.
- QI-4007: Argentina indígena. Sixteen traditional tunes from the natives of Chaco, Argentina. Toba Ensemble "Viri Nolká".
- QF-3013: Música de los pigmeos de la selva del Noroeste del Congo (1976). Recordings and notes by Colin M. Turnbull. Música from the Mbutu, Lese, Bera, and Nyari people (Australian Aboriginals). Published under license of Smithsonian Folkways (FW04446). Lyrichord Discs, US.
- QF-3015/16: Documental folklórico de la Provincia de La Pampa. Musical forms of the Pampas of Argentina: the forms include Danzas, Cifra, Tonada, Estilo y Milonga, Selections, and notes by Ercilia Moreno Chá. Published with the support of the Dirección de Cultura de la Provincia de La Pampa.

=== Produced for third parties ===
The following titles were produced, edited, and often distributed by Fonema S.A. through what was called "Departamento de Productos Especiales de Fonema S.A." The list includes a variety of musical products relative to the nature of the contracting entity commissioning the recordings.

- SCM-1029: Churrasco, vol.1. Selection of Argentine folk tunes. Produced by Curt von Simson for the German restaurant chain Churrasco. In spite of being labeled as "vol.1" the series was discontinued and just one volume was produced.
- SCM-1030: Replica edition of LP SQI-4048 commissioned by Verezit S.A.
- SCM-1031: Argentina, Lieder und Tänze Selection of popular works of Argentina by various artists. Produced by Fonema S.A. for Librerías ABC de Buenos Aires. Notes and texts in German.
- SCM-1032: "Encuentro con el país" (1973) The LP contained eleven popular tunes of Argentina. Produced by Fonema S.A. for Encuentro Nacional de los Argentinos (ENA), a coalition of left-wing parties, which during the early seventies included the Communist Party, Socialists, Social Democrats, Peronists, Christian Democrats, and others.
- SCM-1033/36:Música popular argentina. Ediciones de la Biblioteca Popular Constancio C. Vigil, Colección 2. 4 LPs estereofónicos con registros de temas populares, de intérpretes y autores varios.
- SCM-1037: Navidad con los Niños y Jóvenes Cantores de Bariloche. Villancicos y canciones populares navideñas del repertorio universal. La producción de este registro ha sido auspiciada por la Sociedad Cooperadora del organismo coral. Dirección: Lucka Kralj de Jerman. Portada: vitral de A. Thomas. Estereofónico.
- CM-1038: Coro de Ninos Cantores de Córdoba. Benjamin Britten: A Ceremony of Carols, and works by Emilio Dublanc, Crossman, Gutiérrez del Barrio, Joan Just y Humperdink. María Esther de Videla, órgano. Dirección y piano: Jorge Kohout. Editado con el auspicio del Banco Social de Córdoba.
- SCM-1039/42: Música popular argentina. Popular songs of the Argentine repertoire by various artists. Produced and published by request by the Biblioteca Popular Constancio C. Vigil, Colección 1. Included a total of four LP's in stereo.
- SCM-1043:Edición especial publicitaria includes the totality of the tracks from Discos Qualiton SQI-4011. The LP was commissioned by Grefar S.A.
- CM-1044: "La Patagonia canta". Recorded by Los Hermanos Calo (quartet). Popular repertoire from Patagonia. Cover designed included the reproduction of an oil on canvas work by M. Dola. Released in 1974.
- SCM-1045: Fuerza Aérea Argentina. Escuela de Aviación Militar. Cuerpo de Cadetes. Military marches and popular themes. By the Coro de Cadetes. Conducted by César Ferreira; Banda de Música y Guerra. Conducted by D. F. Pillichody; Conjunto de música y canto nativo de los cadetes de la escuela. Narrated by: Oscar Luna; recited by: Aldo Camaño.
- CM-1046: Pequeña antología de música coral. Coro Polifónico de Santa Fe. Selección de temas del repertorio coral, antiguos y contemporáneos. Dirección: Francisco Maragno. Editado con el apoyo de SANCOR y de la Secretaría de Cultura de la Provincia de Santa Fe.
- A-002: Fundación Bariloche. Commissioned by Fate S. A. Included tracks from Los solistas de la Camerata Bariloche. LP de 17 cm, 33 RPM.
- INA-3000: Coro de la Iglesia Nueva Apostólica de Buenos Aires
- QE-5000: Modelación corporal. A workout aiding tool by Béla Rozemblum.

== Awards ==
- Premio America 1970. Award presented to Discos Qualiton by the Universidad de la República (Uruguay), Asosiación de Relaciones Culturales. The award was granted in recognition for the recordings of the works Alberto Soriano.
- First Prize. "To the singular effort and commitment shown in the recompilation and publishing of the entire works by Domenico Zipoli."
- Special Mention. "Música en la Catedral de Lima".
- The "San Francisco Solano Award" by "Unión de Compositores de la Argentina"

== The artwork ==
Fonema's distinct catalog was acknowledged not only from its content of original and unusual recordings but also for its commitment to the visual arts. Each LP jacket was carefully designed with the works of local artists such as Mele Bruniard, Battle Planas, Luis Seoane, Antonio Berni and Mario Loza. The graphic corporate image of Qualiton was created by Oscar Díaz. Díaz was a prestigious local graphic artist who also conceived the unique logo of Discos Qualiton, Juglaría, and Colección Privada. Qualiton's logo, a spiral to its center representing the groove in a vinyl record, incorporated the illusion of a human eye. The concept merged the idea of music and the visual arts in one label. Pablo Barragan, also a graphic designer, joined Qualiton as the in-house artist during the last years of Fonema.
