= Horacio Quiroga =

Uruguayan writer (1878–1937)

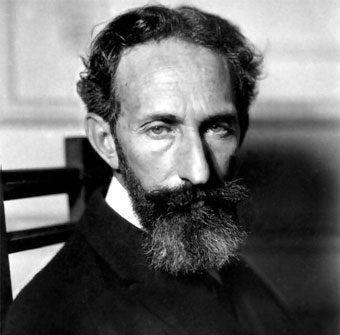
- Born: 31 December 1878; Salto, Uruguay
- Died: 19 February 1937 (aged 58); Buenos Aires, Argentina
- Spouses: Ana María Cires (m. 1909; died 1915) María Bravo (m. 1927)
- Children: 3

Horacio Silvestre Quiroga Forteza (31 December 1878 – 19 February 1937) was a Uruguayan playwright, poet, and short story writer. The jungle settings of his stories emphasized the conflict between humans and nature. His portrayals of mental illness and hallucinatory states were influenced by Edgar Allan Poe. In turn, Quiroga influenced Gabriel García Márquez and Julio Cortázar.

== Biography ==
=== Youth ===
Horacio Quiroga was born in the city of Salto in 1878 as the sixth child and second son of Prudencio Quiroga and Pastora Forteza, a middle-class family. At the time of his birth, his father had been working for 18 years as head of the Argentine vice-consulate. Before Quiroga was two and a half months old, on 14 March 1879, his father accidentally fired a gun he was carrying in his hands and died as a result. Quiroga was baptized three months later in the parish church of his native town.

=== Development ===
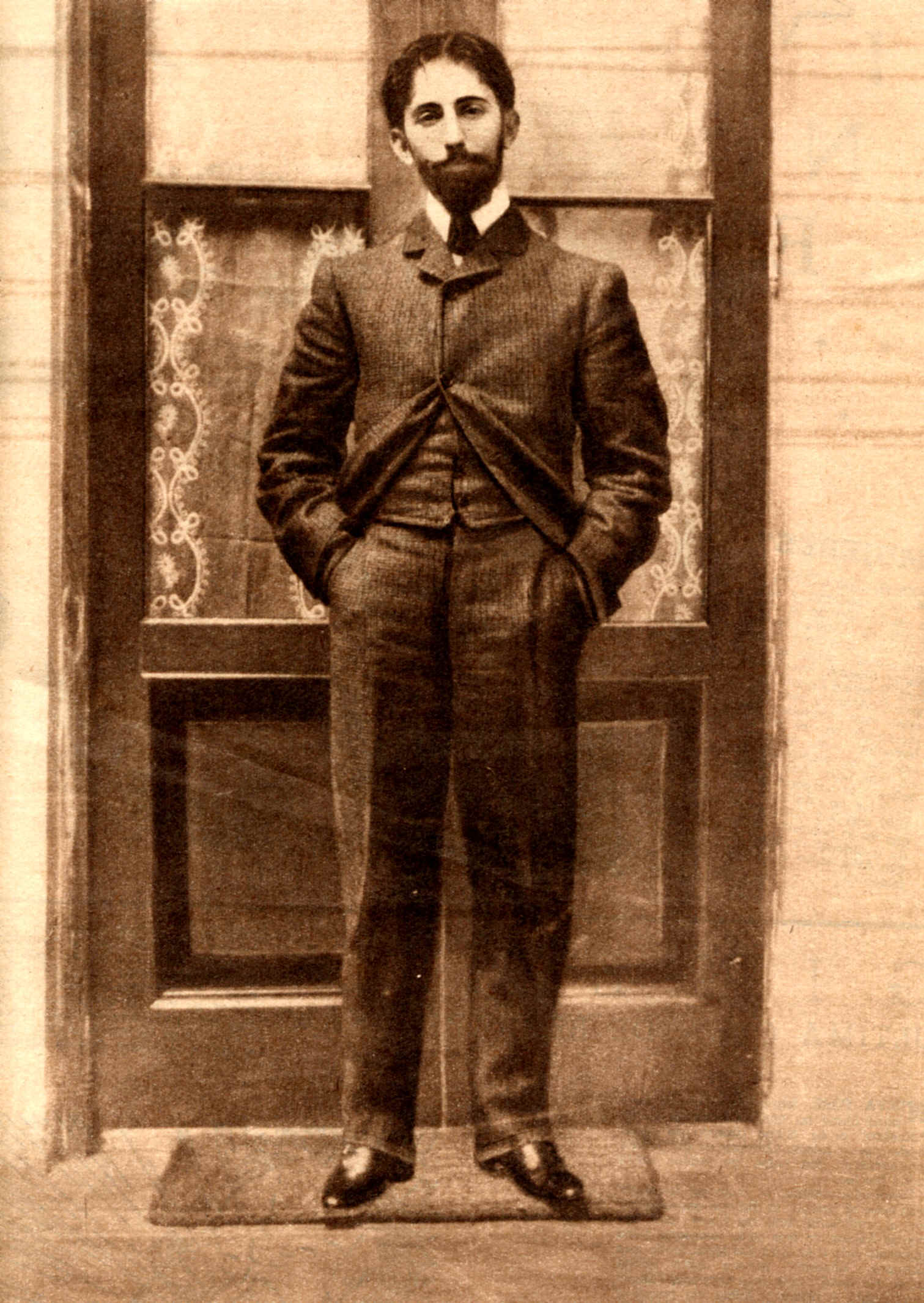
Quiroga in 1897.

Quiroga finished school in Montevideo, the capital of Uruguay. He studied at the National College and also attended the Polytechnic Institute of Montevideo for technical training. From a very young age, he showed great interest in a variety of subjects and activities including literature, chemistry, photography, mechanics, cycling and country life. Around this time he founded the Salto Cycling Club and achieved the remarkable feat of cycling from his home town to Paysandú, a distance of 120 kilometres (74½ miles)

It was also around this time that he worked in a machinery repair shop; under the influence of the owner's son he became interested in philosophy, describing himself as a "forthright and passionate foot soldier of materialism."

At the age of 22, Quiroga became interested in poetry, discovering the work of Leopoldo Lugones, with whom he would later become great friends, and of Edgar Allan Poe. This led him to dabble in various forms and styles of poetic expression himself: post-romanticism, symbolism and modernismo. He soon began to publish his poems in his home town. While studying and working, he collaborated with publications such as La Revista and La Reforma, improving his style and making a name for himself.

During the Carnival of 1898, the young poet met his first love, a girl named Mary Esther Jurkovski, who would inspire two of his most important works: Las sacrificadas (1920; The Slaughtered) and Una estación de amor (1912; A Season of Love). However, the young girl's Jewish parents disapproved of the relationship on the grounds that Quiroga was a Gentile, and the couple were forced to separate.

In his home town, he founded a magazine titled Revista de Salto (1899). In the same year, his stepfather committed suicide by shooting himself; Quiroga witnessed the death. With the money he received as inheritance he embarked on a four-month trip to Paris, which turned out to be a failure: he returned to Uruguay hungry and disheartened.

=== Early career ===
On his return Quiroga gathered together his friends Federico Ferrando, Alberto Brignole, Julio Jaureche, Fernández Saldaña, José Hasda and Asdrúbal Delgado, and with them founded the Consistorio del Gay Saber (The Consistory of The Gay Science), a literary laboratory for their experimental writing, in which they found new ways to express themselves and their modernist goals. In 1901 Quiroga published his first book, Los Arrecifes de Coral (Coral Reefs), but the achievement was overshadowed by the deaths of two of his siblings, Prudencio and Pastora, who were victims of typhoid fever in Chaco Province. That fateful year held yet another shocking event in store for Quiroga. His friend Federico Ferrando had received bad reviews from Germán Papini, a Montevideo journalist, and challenged him to a duel. Quiroga, anxious about his friend's safety, offered to check and clean the gun that was to be used. While inspecting the weapon, he accidentally fired off a shot that hit Ferrando in the mouth, killing him instantly. When the police arrived, Quiroga was arrested, interrogated and transferred to a correctional prison. The police investigated the circumstances of the homicide and deemed Ferrando's death an accident; Quiroga was released after four days' detention. He was eventually exonerated of blame.

Racked with grief and guilt over the death of his beloved friend, Quiroga dissolved The Consistory and moved from Uruguay to Argentina. He crossed the Río de la Plata in 1902 and went to live with María, one of his sisters. In Buenos Aires Quiroga the artist reached professional maturity, which would come to full fruition during his stays in the jungle. His sister's husband also introduced him to pedagogy and found him work as a teacher under contract to the board of examination for the Colegio Nacional de Buenos Aires. He was appointed professor of Spanish at the British School of Buenos Aires in March 1903.

In June of that year Quiroga, already an experienced photographer, accompanied Leopoldo Lugones on an expedition, funded by the Argentine Ministry of Education, in which the famous Argentine poet planned to investigate some ruins of Jesuit missions in the Misiones Province. The jungle of Misiones left a profound impression on Quiroga that marked his life forever: he spent six months and the last of his inheritance (seven thousand pesos) on some land for cotton in Chaco Province, located seven kilometers from Resistencia, next to the Saladito River. The project failed, due to problems with his aboriginal workers, but Quiroga's life was enriched by experiencing life as a countryman for the first time. His narrative benefited from his new knowledge of country people and rural culture; this permanently changed his style.

Upon returning to Buenos Aires after his failed experience in the Chaco, Quiroga embraced the short story with passion and energy. In 1904 he published a book of stories called The Crime of Another, which was heavily influenced by the style of Edgar Allan Poe. Quiroga did not mind these early comparisons with Poe, and until the end of his life, he would often say that Poe was his first and principal teacher.

Quiroga worked for the next two years on a multitude of stories, many were about rural terror, but others were stories for children. During this time he wrote the horror story "The Feather Pillow". It was published in 1917 by a famous magazine in Argentina, Caras y Caretas ("Faces and Masks"), which went on to publish eight of his other stories that year. Shortly after it was published, Quiroga became famous and his writings were eagerly sought by thousands of readers.

=== First marriage ===
In 1906 Quiroga decided to return to his beloved jungle. Taking advantage of the fact that the government wanted the land to be used, Quiroga bought a farm (with Vincent Gozalbo) of 185 hectares (460 acres) in the province of Misiones, on the banks of the Upper Parana, and began making preparations, while teaching Castilian and Literature nearby. He moved in during the winter of 1908.

Quiroga fell in love with one of his teenage students, Ana María Cires, to whom he would dedicate his first novel, entitled History of a Troubled Love. Quiroga insisted on the relationship despite the opposition of her parents, eventually garnering their permission to marry her and take her to live in the jungle with him. Quiroga's parents-in-law were concerned about the risks of living in Misiones, a wild region, and that is why they decided to join their daughter and son-in-law, and live close by in order to help them. So, Ana María's parents and a friend of her mother moved into a house near Quiroga.

In 1911, Ana María gave birth to the couple's first child, at their home in the jungle; they named her Eglé Quiroga. During the same year, the writer began farming in partnership with his friend, fellow Uruguayan Vicente Gozalbo, and he was also appointed justice of the peace in the civil registry of San Ignacio. This job was not the best fit for Quiroga who, forgetful, disorganized and careless, took to the habit of jotting down deaths, marriages and births on small pieces of paper and "archiving" them in a cookie tin. Later, a character in one of his stories was given a similar trait.

The following year Ana María gave birth to a son, named Darío. Quiroga decided, as soon as the children could walk, that he would personally take care of their upbringing. Stern and dictatorial, Quiroga demanded that every little detail be done according to his requirements. From a young age, he got his children used to the mountains and the jungle. Quiroga exposed them to danger so that they would be able to cope alone and overcome any situation. He even went so far as to leave them alone at night in the jungle, or make them sit on the edge of a cliff with their legs dangling into the void. His daughter learned to breed wild animals and the son to use a shotgun, ride a motorbike and travel alone in a canoe. Quiroga's children never objected to these experiences and actually benefited from them. Their mother, however, was terrified and exasperated by her husband's eccentric ways. Elements of this upbringing appear in his short story, "Hijo," ("Son") written in 1935 and included in his collection Más allá.

Between 1912 and 1915 the writer, who already had experience as a cotton farmer and herbalist, undertook a bold pursuit to increase the farming and maximize the natural resources of their lands. He began to distill oranges and produce coal and resins, as well as many other similar activities. Meanwhile, he raised livestock, domesticated wild animals, hunted, and fished. Literature continued to be the peak of his life: in the journal Fray Mocho de Buenos Aires Quiroga published numerous stories, many set in the jungle and populated by characters so naturalistic that they seemed real.

But Quiroga's wife was not happy: although she had become well-adapted to life in the jungle, the relationship between her and her husband was fraught with discord. Clashes between the couple occurred frequently, and although the cause was usually trivial, their excessive arguments became daily setbacks. These incidences, accentuated by Quiroga's volatile nature, disturbed his wife so greatly that she became depressed. After a violent fight with Quiroga, Ana María ingested a fatal dose of the mercury dichloride that Quiroga used for his photography. The poison did not kill her instantly; she died on 14 December 1915.

=== Buenos Aires ===
After Ana María's death, Quiroga left for Buenos Aires with his children where he became an under-secretary general accountant at the Uruguayan Consulate, thanks to the efforts of some of his friends who wanted to help. Throughout the year 1917, Quiroga lived in a basement with his children on Avenue Canning, alternating his diplomatic work with setting up a home office and working on many stories, which were being published in prestigious magazines. Quiroga collected most of the stories in several books, the first was Tales of Love, Madness and Death (1917). Manuel Galvez, owner of a publishing firm, had suggested that he write it and the volume immediately became a huge success with audiences and critics, consolidating Quiroga as the true master of the Latin American short story.

The following year he settled in a small apartment on Calle Agüero, while he published Jungle Tales (1918, a collection of children's stories featuring animals and set in the Misiones rainforest). Quiroga dedicated this book to his children, who accompanied him during that rough period of poverty in the damp basement.

In 1919, Quiroga was twice promoted in the consular ranks. He also had published his latest collection of stories, The Wild. The next year, following the idea of "The Consistory", Quiroga founded the Anaconda Association, a group of intellectuals involved in cultural activities in Argentina and Uruguay. His only play, The Slaughtered, was published in 1920 and was released in 1921, when Anaconda was release, another book of short stories. An important Argentine newspaper, La Nación (The Nation), also began to publish his stories, which by now already enjoyed impressive popularity. Between 1922 and 1924, Quiroga served as secretary of a cultural embassy to Brazil and he published his new book: The Desert (stories). He worked as a film critic for a time and also wrote the screenplay for a feature film, The Florida Raft, that was never realized. Shortly thereafter, he was invited to form a school of cinematography by Soviet investors, but it was unsuccessful.

=== Second marriage ===
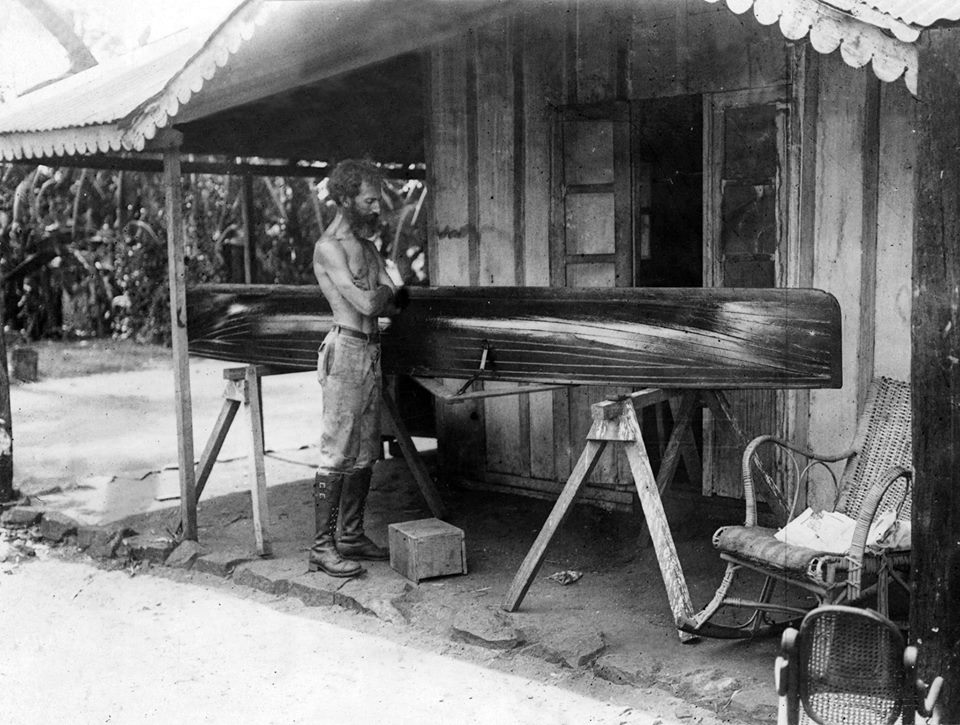
Quiroga repairing a canoe in San Ignacio, Misiones Province, 1926.

Quiroga then returned to Misiones. He was in love again, this time with a 22-year-old Ana María Palacio. He tried to persuade her parents to let her go to live in the jungle with him. Palacio's parents' unrelenting rejection of this idea and the consequent failure of the relationship inspired the theme of his second novel, Past love (published later, in 1929). The novel contains autobiographical elements of the strategies he used himself to pursue Palacio, such as leaving messages in a hollowed branch, sending letters written in code and trying to dig a long tunnel to her room with thoughts of kidnapping her. Finally, the parents grew tired of Quiroga's attempts and took her away so he was forced to renounce his love.

In the workshop in his house, he built a boat he christened Gaviota. His home was on the water and he used the boat to go from San Ignacio downriver to Buenos Aires and on numerous river expeditions.

In early 1926, Quiroga returned to Buenos Aires and rented a villa in a suburban area. At the height of his popularity, a major publisher honored him, along with other literary figures of the time such as Arturo Capdevila, Baldomero Fernandez Moreno, Benito Lynch, Juana de Ibarbourou, Armando Donoso and Luis Franco.

A lover of classical music, Quiroga often attended the concerts of the Wagner Association. He also tirelessly read technical texts, manuals on mechanics, and books on arts and physics.

In 1927, Quiroga decided to raise and domesticate wild animals, while publishing his new book of short stories, Exiles. But the amorous artist had already set his eyes on what would be his last love: María Elena Bravo, a classmate of his daughter Eglé, who married him that year, not even 20 years old (He was 49).

=== Return to Misiones ===
In 1932 Quiroga again settled in Misiones, where he would retire, with his wife and third daughter (María Elena, called Pitoca, who was born in 1928). To do this, he got a decree transferring his consular office to a nearby city. He was devoted to living quietly in the jungle with his wife and daughter.

Due to a change of government, his services were declined and he was expelled from the consulate. To exacerbate Quiroga's problems, his wife did not like living in the jungle, so fighting and violent discussions became a daily occurrence.

In this time of frustration and pain he published a collection of short stories titled Beyond (1935). From his interest in the work of Munthe and Ibsen, Quiroga began reading new authors and styles and began planning his autobiography.

=== Decline and death ===
In 1935 Quiroga began to experience prostate problems. He heeded his wife's advice and consulted doctors in Posadas, who diagnosed him with prostate hypertrophy.

Quiroga separated from his second wife, who left along with their youngest daughter back to Buenos Aires. Worsening health prompted Quiroga to travel to Buenos Aires for medical treatment. In 1937, he was diagnosed with terminal prostate cancer. María Elena and his large group of friends came to comfort him.

When Quiroga was in the emergency ward, he had learned that a patient was shut up in the basement with hideous deformities similar to those of Joseph Merrick. Taking pity, Quiroga demanded that the patient, named Vicent Batistessa, be released from confinement and moved into his room. Batistessa was grateful and befriended the writer.

Quiroga disclosed his plan to commit suicide to Batistessa, who offered to help. On the morning of 19 February 1937, Horacio Quiroga drank a glass of cyanide that killed him within minutes. His body was buried in the grounds of the Casa del Teatro de la Sociedad Argentina de Escritores (SADE), of which he was the founder and vice-president, although his remains were later repatriated to his homeland.

== Work and influences ==
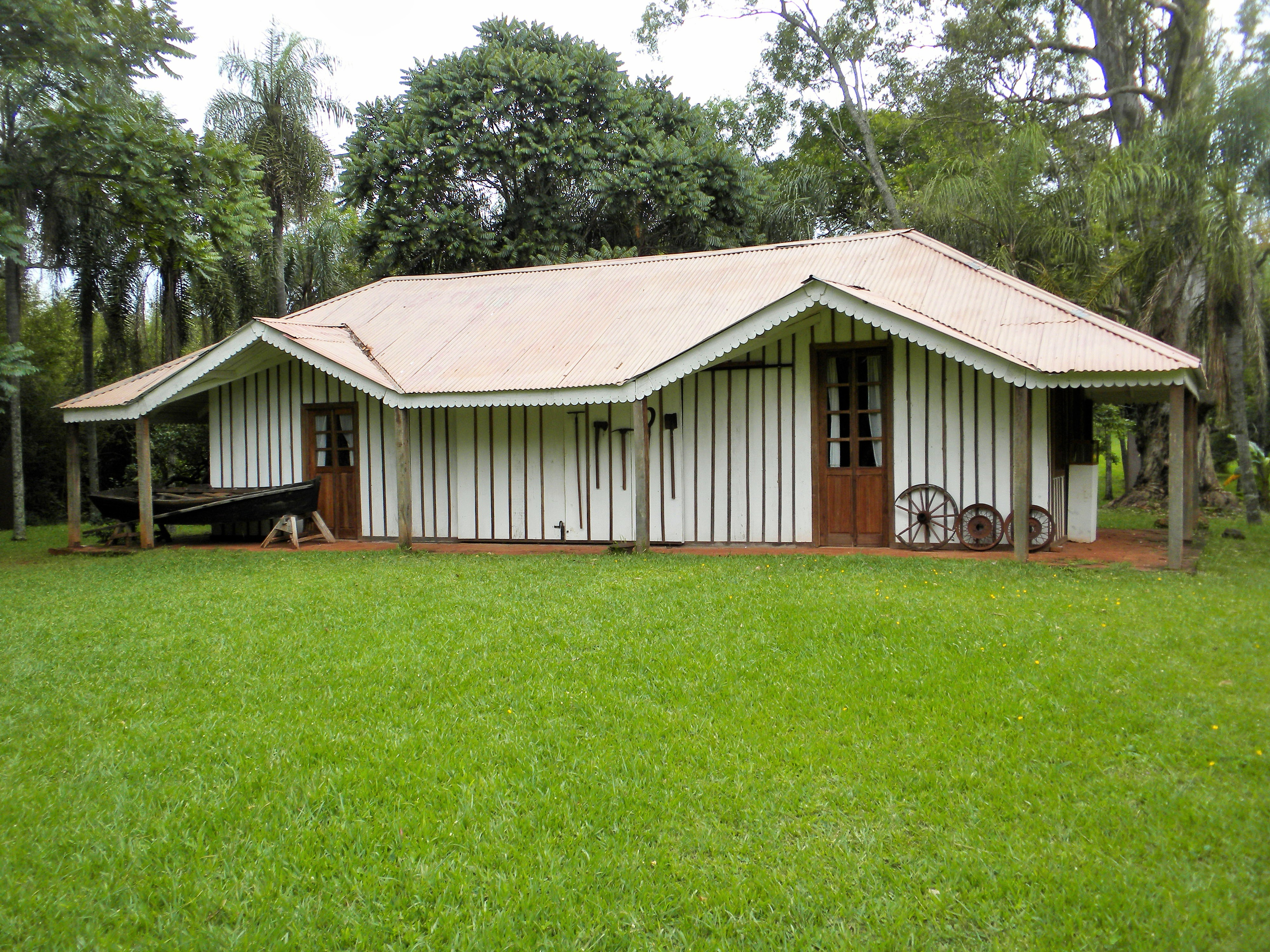
The house in San Ignacio where Quiroga lived, now a museum.

As a follower of the modernista school founded by Rubén Darío, as well as admirer of Edgar Allan Poe and Guy de Maupassant, Quiroga was attracted to topics covering the most intriguing aspects of nature, often tinged with horror, disease, insanity and human suffering. Many of his stories belong to this movement, embodied in his work Tales of Love, Madness and Death.

Quiroga was also inspired by British writer Rudyard Kipling (The Jungle Book), which is shown in his own Jungle Tales.

His Décalogo del Perfecto Cuentista (Ten Commandments for the Perfect Storyteller), dedicated to young writers, provides certain contradictions with his own work. While the Decalogue touts an economic and precise style, using few adjectives, natural and simple wording, and clarity of expression, in many of his own stories Quiroga did not follow his own principles, using ornate language, with plenty of adjectives and at times ostentatious vocabulary.

== Legacy ==
A species of South American snake, Apostolepis quirogai, is named in his honor.

== Selected works ==
- Coral Reefs (Los arrecifes de coral, poetry, 1901)
- The Crime of Another (El crimen del otro, stories, 1904)
- The Feather Pillow (El almohadón de plumas, short story, 1907)
- History of a Troubled Love (Historia de un amor turbio, novel, 1908)
- Stories of Love, Madness, and Death (Cuentos de amor de locura y de muerte, stories, 1917)
- Jungle Tales (Cuentos de la selva, stories for children, 1918)
- The Wild (El salvaje, stories, 1920)
- The Slaughtered (Las sacrificadas, drama, 1920)
- Anaconda (stories, 1921)
- The Desert (El desierto, stories, 1924)
- The Beheaded Hen and Other Stories (La gallina degollada y otros cuentos, stories, 1925)
- Exiles (Los desterrados, stories, 1926)
- Past Love (Pasado amor, novel, 1929)
- Native Soil (Suelo natal, fourth grade reader book, 1931)
- Beyond (El más allá, stories, 1935)
- The Chair of Pain (El sillon del dolor, stories, 1937)
- Drifting (Horacio Quiroga (1879–1937))
