= Luis Franco (writer) =

Argentine autodidact and poet (1898–1988)

- Portrait, 1959
- Born: November 15, 1898; Belén, Catamarca, Argentina
- Died: June 1, 1988 (aged 89); Buenos Aires, Argentina
- Occupations: Poet, essayist

Luis (Leopoldo) Franco (November 15, 1898 – June 1, 1988) was an Argentine autodidact, a self-made intellectual, essayist, and poet.

== Biography ==
Luis Franco was the son of Luis Antonio and Balbina Acosta and lived most of his life in his native province far from the limelights of Buenos Aires and the academic world which he sincerely despised in favor of a bucolic and rural setting of his father's cattle farm in Belén. At age seventeen Franco was awarded a literary prize for his Oda primaveral. Franco traveled a considerable distance to receive the award riding on a mule's back from Catamarca Province to Tucuman. The attitude raised a few eyebrows in Buenos Aires and a relevant article was published in the prestigious magazine Caras y caretas relating the story of this promising young author. The first literary personality to open the doors to Franco was Horacio Quiroga. Quiroga would eventually introduced Franco to Leopoldo Lugones who recognized his talent and potential. Soon Franco became a recognizable name in the literary world of his time making the acquaintance of Roberto Arlt, Gabriela Mistral and Juana de Ibarbourou amongst others. However, Luis Franco found it difficult to coexist with the cultural apparatus and the bourgeois-style of other intellectuals in Buenos Aires, and soon -after completing his high school degree- returned to his hometown of Belén. In Belén, Franco resided most of his adult life doing what he loved most: working the land, reading and writing. As a result of a personal crisis –coincidental with the military coup of general José Evaristo Uriburu in 1930- Franco dissociates himself from right wing revisionists such as Lugones and begins an audacious journey of introspection in the nature of Argentina's political past. The result is a copious bibliography of essays where the ghost of saints and devils of Argentina's turbulent 1800s comes to life in a unique fashion, one that perhaps Franco only shares with Ezequiel Martínez Estrada.

"Here´s a pagan poet who loves life and sings to life because it finds beauty her delightful expression of love" Leopoldo Lugones, 1923

Franco emerged as a political writer; one seriously committed to the cause of communism. He was a Marxist of Trotskyist tendencies, co-founder of the political party known as Movimiento al Socialismo (MAS) in 1982. Franco also contributed in the 1950s to the Magazine Estrategia next to relevant figures of the local Trotskyist scene such as Perelman, Gallo, Milcíades Peña and Nahuel Moreno. Very much a militant he refused to occupy posts in the university or academic world of the bourgeois which he condemned for its complicity with the system. Luis Franco worked until his very last days in Buenos Aires. Nelson Montes-Bradley recalls meeting the poet at Bar Savoy, a grill in the vicinity of the Congreso: “He was often by himself, writing on a Gloria notebook with his navy blue bic ball-pen”. According to his friend Carlos Penelas, Luis Franco died penniless on June 1, 1988, in a nursing home in Ciudadela, Buenos Aires province.

== Poetry ==
Book Cover

Book Cover

- La Flauta de caña Ediciones América, Buenos Aires, 1920.
- Coplas Buenos Aires, 1921.
- Libro del gay vivir Ediciones Babel, Buenos Aires, 1923.
- Coplas del pueblo Ediciones Glaizer, Buenos Aires, 1927
- Nuevo mundo Ediciones Glaizer, Buenos Aires 1927.
- Los trabajos y los días. Ediciones Babel, Buenos Aires 1928.
- América inicial (1931). Book of the Year Award, Jokey Club, Buenos Aires.
- Nocturnos Ediciones Babel, Buenos Aires, 1932.
- Suma Ediciones Perseo, Buenos Aires, 1938.
- Catamarca en cielo y tierra. Eiciones Kraft, Buenos Aires, (December . 3100 units were printed and numbered from 1 to 3100. Includes 21 Illustrations by Ernesto Ziechmann. This special edition contains the following books: Libro del gay vivir; Coplas del pueblo; Los trabajos y los días; Suma; Canciones. Includes Index of Illustrations, General Index.
- Pan Ediciones Suma, Buenos Aires, 1948.
- Constelación Antología general. Editorial Stilcograf (1959), 228 pp. Premio Municipal de Poesía.
- El corazón en la guitarra, folder with drawings by Ricardo Carpani. Buenos Aires, 1963.
- Four Poems, folder with lithographs by Demetrio Urruchúa. Buenos Aires, 1965.
- Poesía de Luis Franco Anthology. Eudeba (1965)
- Trotsky Carpeta con un poema. Chajá/ Ediciones de poesía. Buenos Aires, 1967. 6 pp.
- Guitarra (Teoría y práctica de la copla). Editorial Lagos. Buenos Aires, (1971)
- Coplas del pueblo
- Insurreción de poema Editorial Colihe-Hachette (1979)
- El mar se embarca Editorial papeles de Buenos Aires. (?)
- Luis Franco A selection of Luis Franco's works read by the author himself. Recorded by Discos Qualiton, LP Juglaría JQ-007. Includes the following poems: “Insondable raíz”; “Suma”; Canción del circo del mar”; “Long ago”; “Nocturno del duo inmóvil”; “Falus”; “Plenilunio”; “Mar nuestro”; El llora-sangre está llorando”; “Coplas solitas”; “El zapatero”; “Conmemoración sin pausa”; “Danza del yaguareté”; “La Cruz del Sur”; “Conjunción”; “Madre ceniza”; Indagación del hombre” and “Primavera de Alicia”.

== Essays ==
Book Cover

- Los hijos de Llastay (fables) Buenos Aires, 1926.
- América inicial Ediciones Babel. Buenos Aires, 1931. Premio Jockey Club.
- El general Paz y los dos caudillajes. Ediciones Anaconda. Buenos Aires, 1933. Ediciones Claridad, Buenos Aires, 1935. Ediciones Rosario, 1946. Editorial Futuro, 1961.There's also a latest edition by Ediciones Solar, Biblioteca "Dimensión Argentina", under the direction of Gregorio Weinberg dating back to 1984. 207 pp. Bibliography and Index. This latest edition is dedicated to René Favaloro (page, 17) and also includes a foreword by David Viñas namely: "Luis Franco: de Lugones a la heterodoxia".
- Biografía de la guerra Ediciones Perseo, Buenos Aires, 1941.
- El fracaso de Juan Tobal Ed. Nuestra Novela, 1941.
- Walt Whitman (El mayor demócrata que el mundo ha visto). Ediciones Perseo, Buenos Aires, 1940. Colección Hombres e ideas. The cover was designed and illustrated with an engraving on wood of Whitman's likeness by Pompeyo Audivert. 113 pp. Includes a reference to Pompeyo Audivert by Luis Franco as an appendix. A later edition of the same was published by Editorial Americalee. Buenos Aires, 1945.
- El otro Rosas Editorial Claridad. (1945)
- Rosas entre anécdotas (En la estancia, en el gobierno, en el destierro). Editorial Claridad, Buenos Aires, 1946.
- Biografía de animales Editorial Peuser, Buenos Aires, 1953, 1961.
- Antes y después de Caseros. Editorial Reconstruir, Buenos Aires, 1954.
- Hudson a caballo Ediciones Alpe, Buenos Aires, 1956, 1973.
- El arca de Noe en el Río de la Plata
- Biografía sacra Editorial Reconstruir. Buenos Aires, 1957.
- Sarmiento y Martí Editorial Lautaro. Buenos Aires, 1958.
- Biografía Patria Editorial Stilcograf (1958)
- Biografía de la guerra
- Pequeño diccionario de la desobediencia Editorial America Lee. Biblioteca de cultura social. Sección VIII. Ensayos e Interpretaciones. Buenos Aires, 1959. 280 pages plus Index. This book is made of several hundred individual, and not necessarily brief considerations on life, literature, moral values, racism, life and death and other considerations. Is a philosophical dictionary in the style of Voltaire's own. e.g. "The mystery of pleasure is as sacred as that of the Trinity". p. 16.
- Domingo F. Sarmiento (Anthology) Compañía General Fabril Editora. Buenos Aires, 1960.
- Revisión de los griegos Editorial Americalee. Buenos Aires, 1960.
- La hembra humana Editorial Futuro. Buenos Aires, 1962; Second Ed. 1974: Shapire Editor. Colección Fuera de Serie. Cover designed by Oscar "Negro" Díaz. 298.pp. Index, bibliography. A total of 3000 copies were printed. Comment: This essay is a powerful testimony in defense of women's rights and against the men-driven society. Once again Franco blames the Catholic Church as the real cause behind women's oppression and neglect.
- Prometeo ante la URSS. G.Dávalos & D.C.Hernández, Libreros. Buenos Aires, 1964.
- Espartaco en Cuba G.Dávalos & D.C.Hernández, Libreros. Buenos Aires, 1965.
- De Rosas a Mitre Dávalos (Astral). Buenos Aires, 1967.
- Los grandes caciques de la pampa Editorial Shapire. Buenos Aires, 1967.
- Sarmiento entre dos fuegos Editorial Paidós. Buenos Aires, 1968.
- Cuentos orejanos Centro Editor de América LAtina. Buenos Aires, 1968.
- La pampa habla Editorial Shapire. Buenos Aires, 1968. Editorial La verde Rama, Buenos Aires, 1968. 225 pp.
- Guitarra adentro Centro Editor de América Latina. Buenos Aires, 1971.
- Rosas. Editorial Propósitos, Buenos Aires, 1970.
- El arca de Noé en el Plata Editorial Lagos. Buenos Aires, 1973.
- El zorro y su vecindario Illustrations by Chacha. Plus Ultra. Buenos Aires, 1976. 93 pp.
- Nuestro padre el árbol Editorial Colihue/Hachette. Buenos Aires, 1978. 94 páginas

== Literary prizes ==
- 1915 Tucumán Province Award.
- 1931 Book of the Year Award, Jokey Club, Buenos Aires.
- 1941 Premio Nacional de Literatura.
- Premio Municipal de Poesía por su libro "Constelación"
- 1984 Gran Premio de Honor de la SADE.
