= Lorenzo Varela =

Galician twentieth-century poet

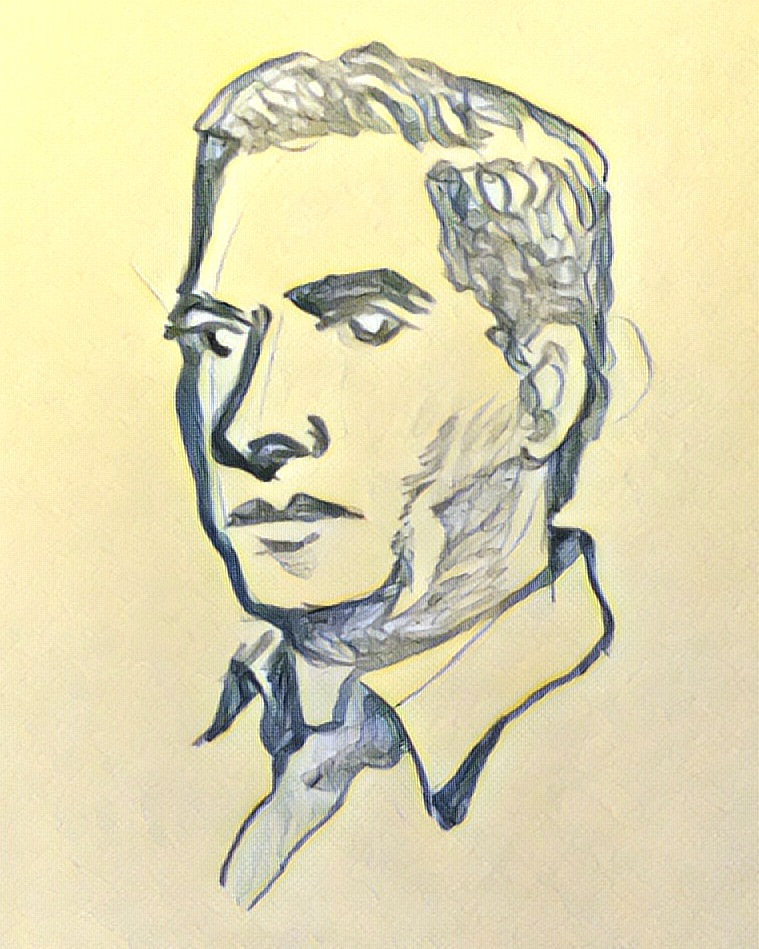
Lorenzo Varela

Xesús Manuel Lorenzo Varela Vázquez (August 10, 1916 in Havana – November 25, 1978 in Madrid) was a Galician poet who spent most of his adult life in exile in Argentina.

== Life and work ==
Varela was born in Havana, Cuba, in 1916 to Galician parents who were emigrating from Galicia. Although official documents cite Havana as his place of birth, many sources say that he was actually born en route to Havana, on the steamer "La Navarre", in which his parents were traveling.

After spending time in Cuba and Argentina, the family returned to Galicia in 1920. Varela grew up in Lugo where he was a founding member of the Federación de Mocedades Galeguistas (Federation of Galician Youth).

In 1934 Varela moved to Madrid, where he studied philosophy and literature. He was associated with the journal P.A.N. (Poetas Andantes y Navegantes, literally Walking and Sailing Poets — the acronym alludes to the Greek god Pan and is also the Spanish and Galician word for bread) and with Misións Pedagóxicas (Pedagogic Missions). He was associated with the Xuventude Socialista and later became a communist.

During the civil war, he published poetry in the journals Hora de España and El Mono Azul. In February 1939, together with others involved in Hora de España, he was interned in the camp at Saint-Cyprien, Pyrénées-Orientales. He was freed after the intervention of French writers and intellectuals, including Richard Bloch and Louis Aragon.

Varela left Spain for Mexico in May 1939, settling for a time in Veracruz, where he worked with Octavio Paz on the journals Romance and Taller. In 1941, he moved to Buenos Aires, where he made contact with other exiled Galicians and emigrants from Galicia and became involved in a number of publishing ventures. With Luís Seoane and Joan Merli, he founded the journal Cabalgata in 1946.

In these years in Argentina, he published most of his important poetry. Most was written in Galician but he also published two books in Spanish in the early years of his exile, Elegías españolas (1940) and Torres de amor (1942). Torres de amor collects many of the poems he had published in previous years.

He visited Spain briefly in 1965. After his return to Argentina, he worked in radio. In 1976 he returned permanently to Spain, settling in Madrid, with his wife Marika Gerstein. He died in Madrid in 1978.

The Día das Letras Galegas ("Galician Literature Day") was dedicated to him in 2005.

== Select works ==
- Catro poemas galegos pra catro grabados, 1944
- Lonxe, 1954
- Federico García Lorca. Canciones y Poemas. Selection of poems by García Lorca read by Lorenzo Varela. Recording by Discos Qualiton QH-2000/2001
- Poesías, 1979
- Poesía galega, 1990
