= Belén, Catamarca =

Belén
- Town
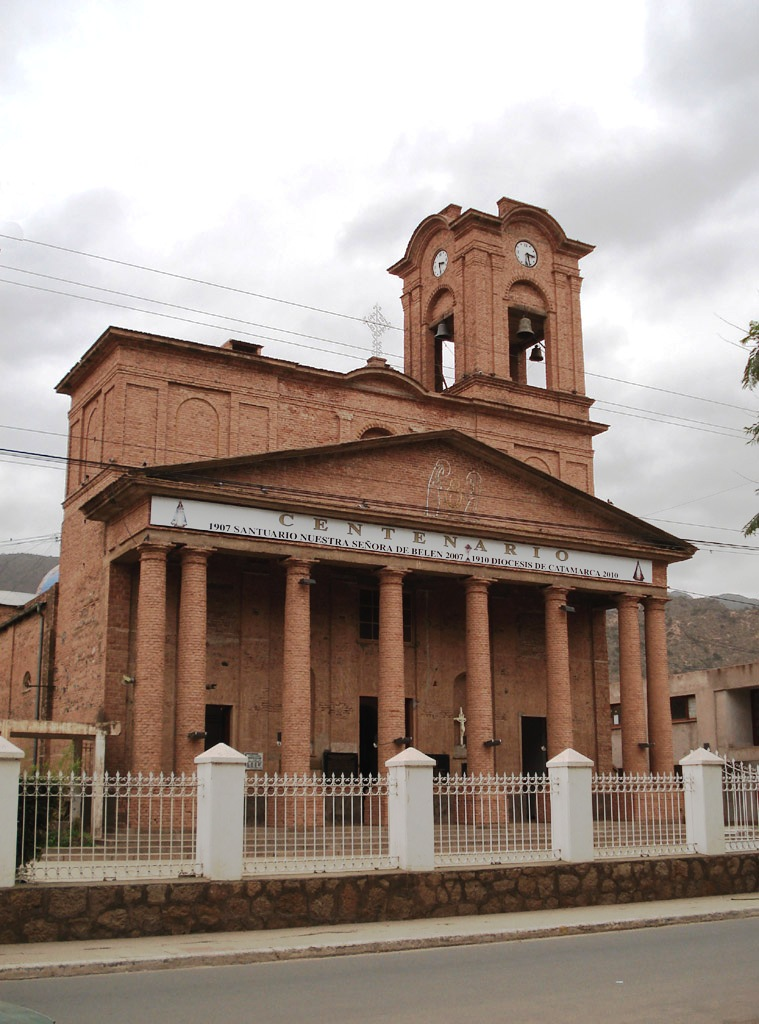
- The Sanctuary of Our Lady of Belén

- Location of Belén in Argentina
- Coordinates: 27°39′S 67°2′W
- Country: Argentina
- Province: Catamarca
- Department: Belén

Population
  - Total: 12,252
- Time zone: UTC−3 (ART)
- CPA base: K4750
- Dialing code: +54 3835

Belén is a small town in the province of Catamarca, Argentina. It has about 12,000 inhabitants according to the 2001 census [INDEC]. It is the head town of the department of the same name. Belén is the birthplace of author and poet Luis Franco.
