= Luis Zubillaga =

Argentine composer

Luis Zubillaga (1928–1995) was an Argentine composer and educator. He was born in Flores, Buenos Aires and was the lifelong partner of artist Elda Cerrato. As an adolescent, he felt that music, especially jazz, was his calling. From 1948 to 1952, he studied trumpet, theory and harmony with Bernardo Barbará; piano, harmony and composition with Cayetano Marcolli; and from 1955 to 1959, he studied composition with Juan Carlos Paz.

After living in Venezuela from 1960–1963, Zubillaga returned to Argentina and took up lectureship at the National University of Tucuman in 1964. Further appointments were held at the National University of La Plata, the Central University of Venezuela and the Conservatory of Music in Moron, Argentina. Awarded with the grant by the Centro Latinoamericano de Altos Estudios Musicales (CLAEM) for the period 1969-70. In 1973, he served as Artistic Director of Teatro Colon in Buenos Aires.

== Zubillaga as composer ==
Zubillaga's passion and uniqueness as a composer is inseparable from his spiritual search. As a youth, he felt deeply moved by the music of George Gurdjieff and Thomas de Hartmann. Gurdjieff’s teachings remained with him through his entire life. Nevertheless, Zubillaga’s music does not only intend to re-enact highly charged emotional inner landscapes, but also envelops his political militancy and the cultural struggle of 20th-century Latin America.

A composer of more than 30 works, Zubillaga himself divides his output into three stages. Notable works from his first period (1961–1966) include "Haiku", "Passages in Fluctuation", both for solo piano, "Directions" for String Quartet, as well as "Music for 10 Instruments" for the film El Huerco (Hell). The turning point arrived in 1967, with his music taking on more expressive nuances of the imagery, such as the effects of "Ambientes" for solo piano, composed in 1967. In 1968, he became a member of the New Music Group (Agrupacion Nueva Musica) presided by his teacher Juan Carlos Paz.

His third period began from 1970 when his music becomes more improvisatory, perhaps due to his experiences playing in the Group of Improvisation (Grupo de Improvisacion) with Enrique Gerardi and Jorge Blarduni. Representative pieces include "Cuando estamos, cuando no estamos" for 8 instruments including the sitar and "Todos los dias… ninguno" for chamber ensemble, which won the composition award at the Simon Bolivar University in 1978.

Sounds of the trumpet and brasses continue to be featured in his compositions from the 1980s, cumulating in the piece "Trumpets in September", composed in 1991. Music from this final period often reminiscence on events or places from the past with titles like "That Afternoon in That House" and "Once…" Two other pieces were dedicated to his wife and one to his son; the latter has yet to be performed.

== Zubillaga as educator ==
As the founding member and artistic director of the Young Symphonic Orchestra (Orquesta Sinfonica Juvenil) at the University of La Plata, he organised the Second Meeting of Latin American Young Symphonic Orchestras, Critics and Composers, in 1985. He further established a couple of associations, becoming the president of CULTRUN Composers Association in 1989 and vice president of the Argentine Federation of Composers in 1991.

His son, the filmmaker Luciano Zubillaga, based his short film entitled Music for a Missing Film (Musica para un film perdido) on the 1962 film score for El Huerco. The short film was presented the London Artists Film and Video Awards (LAFVA) in 2008 and debuted at the 48th Ann Arbor Film Festival in April 2010.

The piece Ongilash (1964) will receive her posthumous premiere on Friday 5 October 2012 by the National Symphony Orchestra (Orquestra Sinfonica Nacional) at the Auditorio de Belgrano, Buenos Aires. Dedicated to his newborn son, the short piece is included in a programme along with Mozart's Piano Concerto No. 24 K491 and Rachmaninov's The Bells Op. 35.

== List of compositions ==
P.1 Haiku, 1961

P.2 Escena I*, 1962

P.3 Paisaje en Fluctuacion, 1962

P.4 Nada Vacias, 1962

P.5 Music para 10 Instrumentos, 1963

P.6 Tres Piezas para Dos Pianos*, 1965

P.7 Direccionales, 1966

P.8 Unidades II, 1966

P.9 Musica para Elda*, 1966

P.10 No musica para no alguien*, 1966

P.11 Ambientes, 1967

P.12 Ongilasch, 1968/1979

P.13 Noches, 1970

P.14 Cuando estamos, cuando no estamos, 1970

P.15 Recordando los momentos que son*, 1970

P.16 Algunos Segmentos, 1970

P.17 Balada de la esperanza*, 1975

P.18 Todos los dias…, ninguno, 1978

P.19 Canciones y Recuerdos, 1978

P.20 Armando Reveron, 1978

P.21 Aquella tarde en aquella casa, 1979

P.22 Escena II, 1982

P.23 Camino a Cata*, 1989

P.24 Oct. '90, 1990

P.25 Para Elda II, 1991

P.26 Trompetas en Septiembre, 1991

P.27 Una vez…, 1993

P.28 Verano del 93*, 1993

P.29 Bue. 93, 1993

P.30 Hoy, piano, 1995

P.31 Aquel lugar (unfinished)*, 1994

Not performed*
