= Rodolfo Arízaga =

Argentine composer

Rodolfo Arizaga (July 11, 1926 – May 12, 1985) was an Argentine composer.

Arizaga was born in Buenos Aires, where he studied composition at the National Conservatory under Alberto Williams, José Gil, Luis Gianneo, and Teodoro Fuchs; he also studied philosophy at the National University. After touring Spain in 1950, he went to Paris in 1954 and studied under Nadia Boulanger and Olivier Messiaen. Here, he also began experimenting with the Ondes Martenot, and composed several works for the instrument. Returning to Argentina in 1960, he taught at Buenos Aires University and worked as music critic for journals and newspapers. He died in Escobar, Greater Buenos Aires.

== Works ==
- Poema de invierno for violin and piano, 1944
- Sonatina for piano, 1944–45
- Jaquinot, Ballet, 1945
- Dos corales, 1945
- Suite para piano, 1945
- Sonata for piano, 1946
- Toccata for piano, 1947
- Pequeño vals en tono gris, 1948
- Sonatina for piano, 1948
- Bailable Real for orchestra, 1948
- Délires, Cantata, 1954–57; rev. 1970
- Serranillas de la infanzona for piano, 1957
- Sonata Breve for piano and Ondes Martenot, 1958
- El organillo for Ondes Martenot, 1958
- Piezas epigramáticas for piano, 1961
- Prometeo 45, Poema Dramático, 1962
- Concierto para piano, 1963
- Tientos para Santa María, 1965
- Música para Cristóbal Colón for orchestra, 1968
- String Quartet No. 1, 1968
- Ciaccona for viola solo, 1969
- El ombligo de los limbos, la momia y una encuesta, 1969
- String Quartet No. 2

== Writings ==
- Manuel de Falla, 1961
- Juan José Castro, 1963
- Enciclopedia de la Música Argentina, 1971
- R. Arizaga, Pompeyo Camps, Historia de la Música en la Argentina, 1990, ISBN 950-22-0304-6
