= Rosa Faccaro =

Argentine painter (1931–2019)

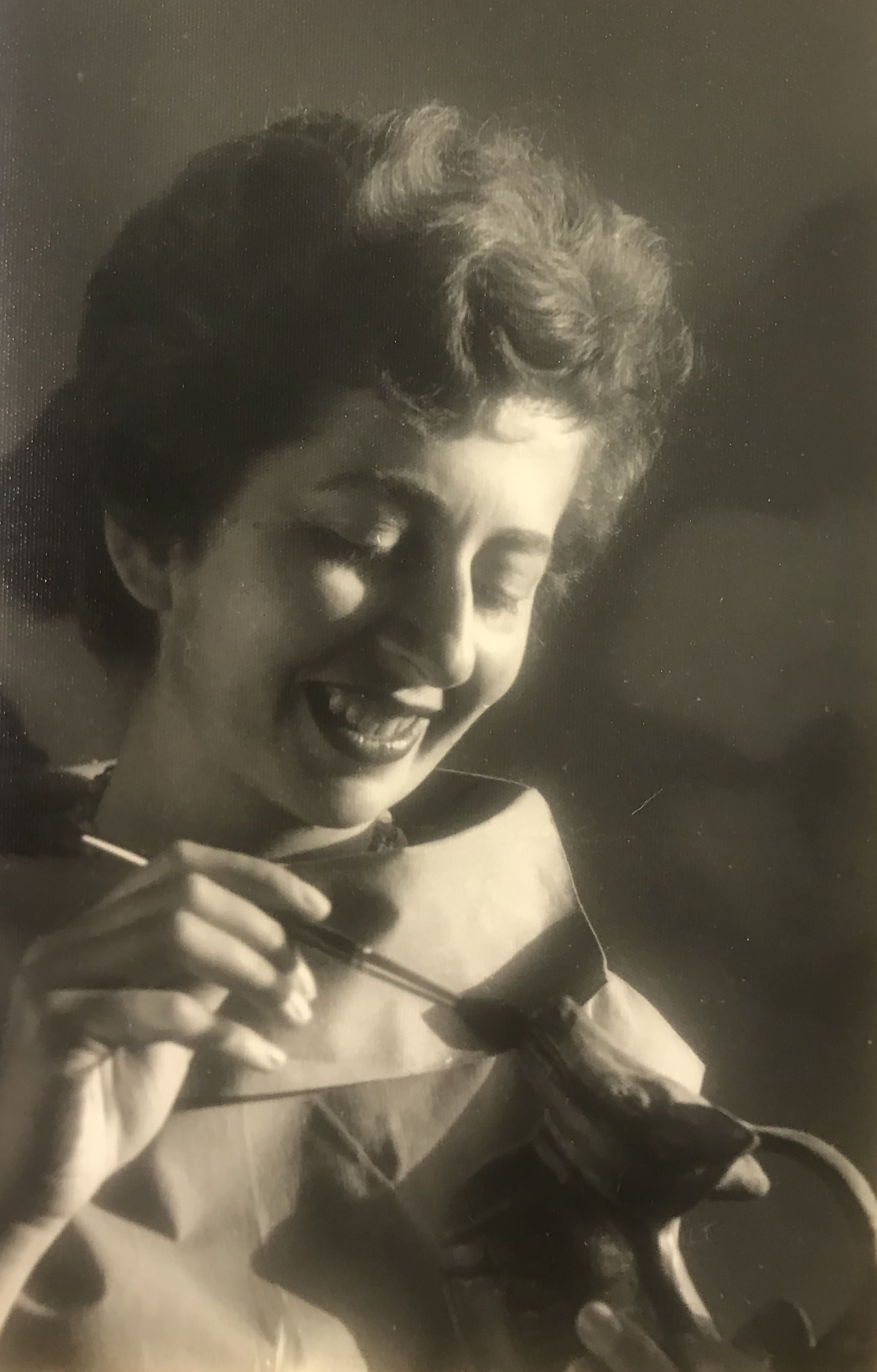
- Faccaro in 1957
- Born: 3 July 1931; Argentina
- Died: 22 January 2019 (aged 87); Buenos Aires, Argentina
- Education: Universidad Nacional de las Artes; National University of Saint Anthony the Abbot in Cuzco
- Occupations: Art critic; Painter; University teacher
- Children: 2

Rosa Faccaro (3 July 1931 – 22 January 2019) was an Argentine art critic, painter and university teacher who specialised in contemporary, Pre-Columbian and textile art. She received several awards for her work, was curator of multiple art exhibitions and was a jury member of many international and national awards. Faccaro collaborated with the artistic section of the newspaper Clarín from 1979 to 2000.

== Early life and education ==
Rosa Faccaro was born in Argentina on 3 July 1931. Faccaro was educated at the Universidad Nacional de las Artes from 1950 to 1958 and later continued her education by attending the National University of Saint Anthony the Abbot in Cuzco, in Cusco, Peru between 1961 and 1965. She educated at the Faculty of Architecture of the National University of Cusco, in Cusco, Peru during 1968 and subsequently at the National School of Fine Arts Prilidiano Pueyrredon from 1965 to 1985.

== Career ==
Faccaro specialised in contemporary, Pre-Coumbian, and textile art. She worked as a post-graduate professor at the Universidad Nacional de las Artes' Media and Technologies for Pictorial Production and at the National University of Rosario's master's degree in Art Education at its Faculty of Art and Humanities. She collaborated to the artistic section of the newspaper Clarín between 1979 and 2000.

She received the Argentine Association of Art Critics Award for Art Criticism in 1986, and organised the First Conference of Contemporary Argentine Art that same year. Faccaro was an adviser and curator of the travelling Citibank Collection of Argentine Art which was exhibited in the Latin American countries of Brazil, Colombia, Mexico, Paraguay, Peru, Uruguay and Venezuela between 1986 and 1988. In 1988, she was director of the La Mujer en la Plástica Argentina project that was staged at the Centro Cultural Recoleta. Faccaro was a jury member of multiple international and national awards. This included the Konex Award for Visual Arts in 1992; the International Biennial of Graphic Art in Ljubljana, Slovenia, from 1995 to 1997; IV Congress of the Union of the Andean Center of Architects in 1996; the VI International Biennale Print and Drawing in Taipei, Taiwan and the I, II, III; V, X, and last Biennial 2008 of Textile Art, Secretariat of Culture of the Nation. In 1992, she won an award for "critical work from the Argentine Society of Plastic Artists". Faccaro received the Alicia Moreau de Justo Award from the City of Buenos Aires three years later.

She was the author of the book Arte textil argentino hoy published in 1996, and curated the First Biennial of Contemporary Art, in Florence, Italy held the following year as well as the Henry Moore Centennial Sculpture Contest at the Museo Nacional de Bellas Artes, in Buenos Aires, staged in 1998. Faccaro was added to the first edition of the ABC de las Artes Visuales en la Argentina encyclopedia by the author Osvaldo Svanascini in September 2006 and the Enciclopedia Visual de la Argentina. That same year, she earned the Medal of Merit from the Association of Plastic Artists of Cuzco, Peru. Faccaro was a board member of the Argentine Association of Art Critics and of the Association Internationales des Critiques d'Art de Paris. She was secretary of proceedings of the Argentine Association of Aesthetics and an honorary member of the Association of Interaction of Art and Psychoanalysis. Faccaro was on the staff of the magazine Revista Magenta from 1995.

== Personal life ==
She was the mother of two children. On 22 January 2019, Faccaro died at her home in the Palermo neighbourhood of the city of Buenos Aires. She was buried at O'Higgins 2842 in the neighbourhood of Belgrano the following day.

Faccaro's daughter described her mother as a "fighter to the end for Argentine art, women, feminism and social justice" and her word was always "conduct, honour and love for that force that has the art of transmuting the material into spirit".
