= List of Spanish composers =

The following is a list of composers from Spain:

== A ==
- Marcial del Adalid y Gurréa (1826–1881), composer
- Dionisio Aguado y García (1784–1849), composer and guitarist
- Sebastian Aguilera de Heredia (1561–1627), composer and organist
- Isaac Albéniz (1860–1909), late Romantic composer and pianist, wrote nationalist works such as Iberia
- Mateo Albéniz (1755–1831), composer
- Manuel Alejandro (born 1969), contemporary song composer
- Francisco Alonso (1887–1948), composer of zarzuela
- Vicente Amigo (born 1967), composer
- Juan de Anchieta (1462–1523), composer
- Juan Crisóstomo Arriaga (1806–1826), Romantic composer, nicknamed the "Spanish Mozart" before dying at age 19
- Emilio Arrieta (1821–1894), composer

== B ==
- Salvador Bacarisse (1898–1963), composer
- Carlos Baguer (1768–1808), composer and organist
- Leonardo Balada (born 1933), composer, naturalized American
- Francisco Asenjo Barbieri (1823–1894), composer of zarzuela
- Sergio Blardony (born 1965), composer
- Tomás Bretón (1850–1923), composer
- Pablo Bruna (1611–1679), composer and organist

== C ==
- Johannes Cornago (c. 1400–after 1475)
- Juan Bautista Cabanilles (1644–1712), composer and organist
- Antonio de Cabezón (1510–1566), composer and organist
- Ramón Carnicer (1789–1855), composer
- Narciso Casanovas (1747–1799), composer
- Ruperto Chapí (1851–1909), composer
- Federico Chueca (1846–1908), composer
- Gaspar Cassado (1897–1966), composer and cellist
- Juan J. Colomer (born 1966), composer
- Francisco Correa de Arauxo (1584–1654), composer and organist

== D ==
- Sebastián Durón (1660–1716), composer
- Gustavo Díaz-Jerez (born 1970), composer
- María Dueñas (born 2002), violinist and composer

== E ==
- Juan del Encina (1468–1529), composer
- Óscar Esplá (1886–1976), composer

== F ==
- Manuel de Falla (1876–1946), 20th-century composer, best known for The Three-Cornered Hat
- Gutierre Fernández (c. 1547–1623), composer and priest
- Pere-Enric de Ferran i de Rocabruna (1865–1919), Spanish music composer
- Mateo Flecha (1481–1553), composer

== G ==
- Antón García Abril (1933–2021), composer
- Manuel García the Senior (1775–1832), also Manuel del Pópulo Vicente Rodriguez García
- Joaquín García de Antonio (1710-1779), composer
- Roberto Gerhard (1896–1970), composer
- Ramón González Barrón (1897–1987), composer and choral conductor
- Enrique Granados (1867–1916), nationalist composer and pianist, influenced later composers such as Manuel de Falla
- Isabel Güell i López (1872-1956), composer of religious works; pianist, organist
- Antonio Guerrero (1709–1776), composer and guitarist
- Francisco Guerrero (1528–1599), composer
- Jesús Guridi (1886–1961), composer

== H ==
- Cristóbal Halffter (1930–2021), composer and conductor
- Ernesto Halffter (1905–1989), composer
- Rodolfo Halffter (1900–1987), composer
- Luis Venegas de Henestrosa (c. 1510–1570)
- Juan Hidalgo de Polanco (1614–1685), composer and harpist
- Joaquin Homs (1906–2006), composer

== I ==
- Sebastián Iradier (1809–1865), composer

== L ==
- Ricard Lamote de Grignon (1899–1965), composer
- Ramon Lazkano (born 1968), composer
- Antoni Lliteres Carrió (1673–1747), composer of zarzuela
- Miguel Llobet (1878–1938), guitarist and composer
- Alonso Lobo (1555–1617), composer
- Francisco Losada (1612–1667), composer and conductor
- Marta Lozano Molano (born 1985), composer
- Paco de Lucía (1947–2014), composer
- Hermes Luaces (born 1975), composer
- Pablo Luna (1879–1942), composer of zarzuela

== M ==
- Tomás Marco (born 1942), composer
- Josep Mestres Quadreny (born 1929), composer
- Marc Migó (born 1993), composer
- Luis de Milán (c. 1500–1561), composer and vihuelist
- Federico Mompou (1893–1987), composer
- Ramón Montoya (1880–1949), composer
- Xavier Montsalvatge (1912–2002), composer
- José Luis Morán, (born 1963), composer
- Cristóbal de Morales (1500–1553), composer
- Federico Moreno Torroba (1891–1982), composer
- Alonso Mudarra (1510–1580), composer

== N ==
- Luis de Narváez (fl. 1526–1549), composer and vihuelist
- José Luis Narom (born 1963), composer
- Pablo Nassarre (1650–1730), composer, organist, and theorist
- José Nieto (b. 1942)
- Jaime Nunó (1824–1908), composer

== O ==
- Fernando Obradors (1897–1945), composer
- Gonzalo de Olavide (1934–2005), composer
- María Teresa Oller (1920–2018), composer and folklorist
- Diego Ortiz (1510–1570), composer and theorist

== P ==
- Luis de Pablo (1930–2021)
- Felipe Pedrell (1841–1922)
- Joan Baptista Pla (1720–1773)
- David del Puerto (born 1964)
- Joan Pau Pujol (1570–1626)
- José Manuel Pérez-Muñoz (born 1978)

== R ==
- Niño Ricardo (1904–1972), composer
- Antonio Ripa (1721–1795), composer
- Joaquín Rodrigo (1901–1999), 20th-century composer, wrote the Concierto de Aranjuez for classical guitar and orchestra
- Antonio Rodríguez de Hita (1722–1787), composer
- Antonio Rosales (c.1740–1801), composer of zarzuelas and tonadillas
- Ángel Rubio y Laínez (1846–1906), composer of zarzuelas
- Antonio Ruiz-Pipò (1934–1997), 20th-century composer for the guitar

== S ==
- Sabicas (1912–1990), composer
- José María Sánchez-Verdú (born 1968), composer
- Manolo Sanlúcar (born 1943), composer
- Gaspar Sanz (1640–1710), Baroque era guitar composer
- Pablo de Sarasate (1844–1908), Romantic era virtuoso violinist and composer
- José Serrano (1873–1941), composer
- Juan Sesé y Balaguer (1736–1801), composer
- Antonio Soler (1729–1783), wrote sonatas and concertos for the harpsichord and organ
- Josep Soler (1935 – 2022), composer, wrote 16 operas, 7 symphonies, 3 piano concertos, 7 String Quartets, 16 Sonatas for piano.
- Fernando Sor (1778–1839), best known as a guitarist and composer for the guitar, he also wrote three symphonies, ballets, a mass, an opera etc.
- Pablo Sorozábal (1897–1988), composer
- Bohdan Syroyid (1995–), Ukrainian-born Spanish composer

== T ==
- Francisco Tárrega (1852–1909), Romantic era guitarist and composer
- Eduardo Torres (1872–1934), Late Romantic composer of organ works and guitar pieces
- Joaquín Turina (1882–1949), composer of chamber music, piano works, guitar pieces, and songs

== U ==
- Juan de Urrede (c. 1430 – after 1482)
- José María Usandizaga (1887–1915)

== V ==
- Manuel Valls (1920–1984), composer
- Joaquín Valverde Durán (1846–1910), composer of zarzuelas
- Joaquín "Quinito" Valverde Sanjuán (1875–1918), composer of zarzuelas
- Octavio Vazquez (born 1972), composer
- Tomás Luis de Victoria (1548–1611), composer
- Pedro Vilarroig (born 1954), contemporary neo-tonal composer.
- Sebastián de Vivanco (1551–1622), composer
- Amadeo Vives (1871–1932), composer

== Z ==
- Valentín Zubiaurre (1837–1914), composer

== See also ==
- Chronological list of Spanish classical composers
