= Francisco Correa de Arauxo =

Spanish organist and composer

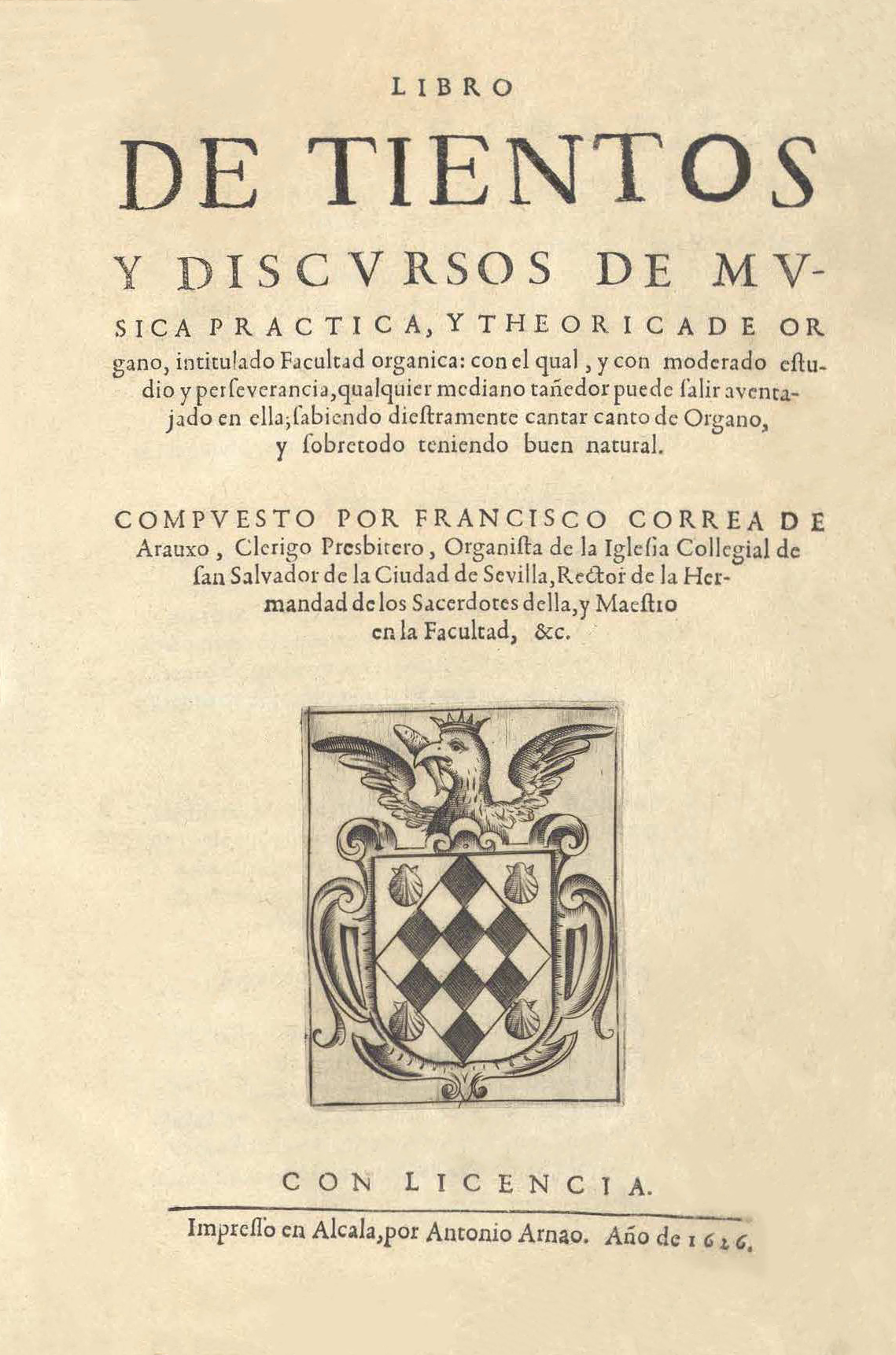
Libro de tientos y discursos de musica practica y theoríca de organo (1626).

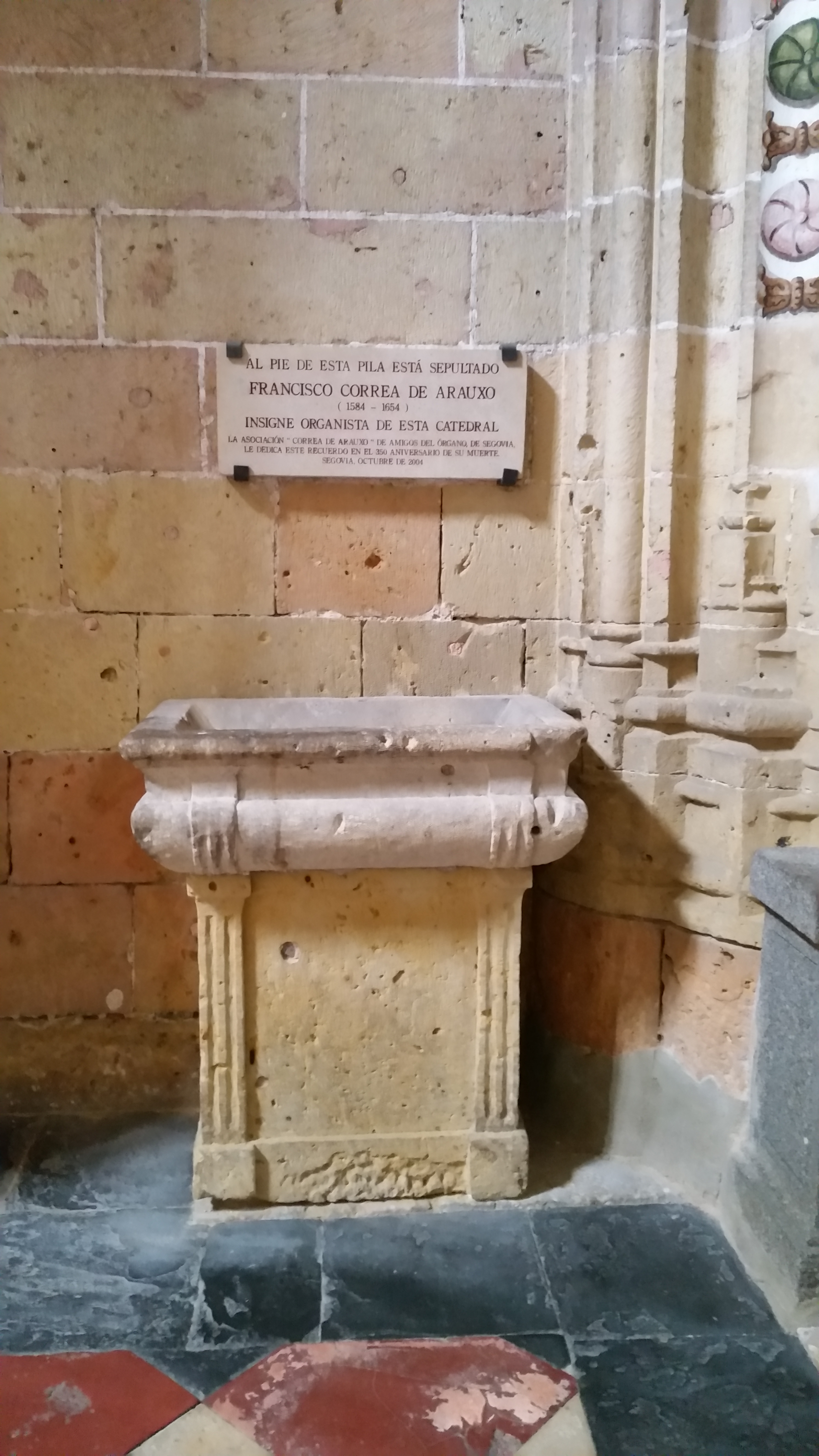
Burial of Correa de Araujo in the Cathedral of Segovia.

Francisco Correa de Araujo (or Arauxo, or Acebedo) (1584–1654) was a Spanish organist, composer, and theorist of the late Renaissance.

== Life ==
Correa de Araujo was born in Seville. Like most Spanish organists from this era, details of his life are clouded by obscurity. For some time even the years of his birth and death were disputed. His musical background is unclear; he claimed to have learned theory by studying the works of Francisco de Peraza and Diego del Castillo. In 1599 he received an organ appointment in Seville, but became embroiled in a lawsuit with rival Juan Picafort, which delayed confirmation of this appointment for six years. In 1608, he was ordained as a priest. He maintained the post at Seville until 1636. Several times he applied unsuccessfully for other positions, and once again in 1630, he became embroiled in lawsuits which culminated in a brief period of imprisonment. In 1636, he left Seville and took up a post at Jaén Cathedral. In 1640, he was appointed as a prebendary at Segovia Cathedral, and remained there for the last fourteen years of his life. He died in Segovia in abject poverty.

== Works ==
Correa's writings make reference to two other publications (a Libro de versos and a book on music theory), that were not published yet by that time; however, all his surviving works are contained in a single publication entitled Libro de tientos y discursos de música practica, y theorica de organo intitulado Facultad organica, published in 1626. This publication serves not only as a book of compositions, but as a treatise on music theory and performance practice, and it is one of the most important works of its kind to emerge from Spain in the 17th century. Correa's compositions take advantage of all the devices available to Spanish organists of the time, most notably the medio registro, or divided keyboard, an innovation unique to the Iberian peninsula which appeared towards the end of the 16th century, while his theoretical writings give great insight into his ideas of harmony and counterpoint.

The Libro de tientos contains 69 works, of which 62 are tientos (that is, fantasias), ordered by increasing levels of difficulty - an indication that the purpose behind this work was at least partly pedagogical. By way of contrast with the works of his Portuguese contemporary, Coelho, Correa's works are considerably shorter and show a stronger tendency towards monothematicism. He employs virtuosic figurations (the so-called glosa) in his works to a much greater extent, often at the expense of contrapuntal development; after the initial exposition, restatements of the theme are rare, and thematic development and use of contrapuntal devices such as inversion or augmentation are almost non-existent. Correa's harmonic language, while not devoid of tonally suggestive progressions, is quite distinctly modal and represents a continuation of the idiom established by Cabezón and Aguilera de Heredia.

The music of Correa is not devoid of innovation. Correa makes use of many devices unique to Spanish organ music of this period: unusual sonorities such as the augmented triad, unusual rhythmic groupings, and a notable dissonance which he vigorously defends, referred to as punto intenso contra remisso: the simultaneous sounding of a note and its chromatic alteration (e.g., C and C#). The theoretical aspect of this work also discusses ornamentation, notes inegales, registration, and use of the different modes and key signatures.

Correa's organ music was inspired by the unique tonal qualities of Spanish organs, unequal temperament, and such devices as the divided keyboard. Modern-day recording technology, coupled with an increased interest in studying ancient organs and building newer instruments to replicate them, has made these works more readily accessible to both performer and listener.

A complete edition of Correa's works has been compiled by Macario Santiago Kastner and released by Masters Music Publications.

== Recordings ==
- Francisco Correa de Araujo: Facultad organica. José Enrique Ayarra, organist. Almaviva.
- Organ works. Bernard Foccroulle (1992 Auvidis / Valois. V 4646)
- Correa in the New World: The Complete Organ Works of Francisco Correa de Arauxo. Robert Bates, organist. Loft, 2017.
- De Arauxo: Libro de tientos. Bernard Foccroulle, organist. Ricercar, 2022.
