= Miguel Roig-Francolí =

Spanish-American composer, music theorist and pedagogue

Miguel Ángel Roig-Francolí (born 1953) is a Spanish/American composer, music theorist, and pedagogue. His 1980 Cinco piezas para orquesta (Five Pieces for Orchestra), commissioned by Radio Nacional de España and written in a postmodern, neotonal style, won first prize in the National Composition Competition of the Spanish Jeunesses Musicales in 1981 and second prize at the UNESCO International Rostrum of Composers in 1982, and continues to be widely performed in Spain. His later compositions often have spiritual themes and are based on sacred texts and the melodies of Gregorian chant. In 2016 he won the American Prize in Composition (Band/Wind Ensemble Division) for Perseus, for symphonic band. An expert on Renaissance composers Tomás de Santa María, Antonio de Cabezón, and Tomás Luis de Victoria, he has published numerous scholarly articles and monographs and two textbooks. Roig-Francolí is a Distinguished Teaching Professor of Music Theory and Composition at the University of Cincinnati – College-Conservatory of Music.

== Life and career ==
Miguel A. Roig-Francolí was born in Ibiza in 1953. He studied composition privately in Madrid with Miguel Ángel Coria from 1976 to 1981 as well as graduating with a degree in piano from the Conservatorio Profesional de Música de Baleares in Majorca in 1982. He took his Master of Music degree in Composition in 1985 at Indiana University where he studied under the Chilean composer Juan Orrego-Salas. He then received the Título de Profesor Superior de Armonía, Contrapunto, Composición e Instrumentación from the Madrid Royal Conservatory in 1988 and two years later his PhD from Indiana University with his doctoral dissertation "Compositional Theory and Practice in Mid-Sixteenth-Century Castilian Instrumental Music: The Arte de tañer fantasía by Tomás de Santa María and the Music of Antonio de Cabezón". After teaching at Ithaca College, Northern Illinois University, and Eastman School of Music, he became Professor of Music Theory and Composition at the University of Cincinnati – College-Conservatory of Music in 2000. Although the majority of his published articles relate to 16th-century Spanish music and its composers, he has also written on atonal music and on the 20th-century composer, György Ligeti. His first textbook, Harmony in Context, was published by McGraw-Hill in 2003 and is now in its second edition. This was followed in 2006 by Understanding Post-Tonal Music (also published by McGraw-Hill).

Roig-Francolí's career as a composer began in the late 1970s while he was a student of Miguel Ángel Coria. His first work, Espejismos (Mirages), premiered at the Festival Internacional de Barcelona in 1977. His most famous work, Cinco Piezas para Orquesta, was a commission by Spanish National Radio and composed in 1980. After winning the 1981 National Composition Competition of the Spanish Jeunesses Musicales, it was premiered by the Spanish Radio and Television Symphony Orchestra at Madrid's Teatro Real in 1982, and subsequently won second prize at the UNESCO International Rostrum of Composers (Paris, 1982). The work, described by musicologist Antoni Pizà as an "absolute pioneer" in introducing the postmodern aesthetic to Spanish music, has since been performed in Spain by the Orquesta Nacional de España (conducted by Jesús López Cobos), Orquestra Ciutat de Barcelona, Orquesta Sinfónica de Madrid, and Orquestra Simfònica de les Illes Balears. The score has formed the basis for two ballets: La Espera (choreographed by Ray Barra and performed by the Ballet Nacional del Teatro de la Zarzuela in 1987) and Five Elements (choreographed by Jiang Qi and performed by Dance China NY in 2010). After 1987, he concentrated primarily on his academic research and teaching but returned to composing in 2003 in what he has described as a personal reaction to the Iraq War: "Following the Iraq war and other events, I returned to composition as a way to engage with the world around me." The works from this second creative period often have spiritual themes and are based on sacred texts and the melodies of Gregorian chant. They include the choral works Dona eis requiem (In memory of the innocent victims of war and terror) (premiered by Orquestra Simfònica de les Illes Balears and Coral Cármina in 2006), Antiphon and Psalms for the Victims of Genocide (premiered by the Orquesta y Coro de la Comunidad de Madrid in 2008), and Missa pro pace (premiered by the Orquestra Simfònica i Cor Ciutat de Eivissa in 2008). One of Roig-Francolí's most recent works, Songs of the Infinite, was commissioned by the Foundation for Iberian Music. It premiered at Carnegie Hall on October 24, 2010. A monographic concert dedicated to Roig-Francolí's chamber music took place at Carnegie Hall's Weill Recital Hall on Nov. 17, 2013. Other recent works include Three Astral Poems (Orion, Andromeda, and Perseus), for orchestra; Sonata for two guitars, composed for and premiered by Duo Melis; and Sinfonía, “De profundis,” for orchestra.

== Awards ==
- First prize, National Composition Competition of the Spanish Jeunesses Musicales (1981)
- Second prize, UNESCO International Rostrum of Composers (Paris, 1982)
- Dean's Dissertation Prize, Indiana University (1991)
- Dana Research Fellow Award, Ithaca College (1992)
- Medal of Honor, Superior Conservatory of Music of the Balearic Islands (2004)
- A. B. "Dolly" Cohen Award for Excellence in Teaching, University of Cincinnati (2007)
- George Rieveschl, Jr. Award for Creative and/or Scholarly Work, University of Cincinnati (2009)
- Ramón Llull Prize, Government of the Balearic Islands (Spain, 2010)
- Distinguished Teaching Professor Award, University of Cincinnati (2013)
- Gold Medal of the Island of Ibiza, Spain (2014)
- American Prize in Composition (Band/Wind Ensemble Division), for Perseus, for symphonic band (2016)

== Publications ==
=== Textbooks ===
- Harmony in Context (3rd edn.). McGraw Hill, 2020.
- Harmony in Context (2nd edn.). McGraw-Hill, 2011, ISBN 0-07-313794-4
- Understanding Post-Tonal Music. McGraw-Hill, 2006, ISBN 978-0-07-293624-7. Chinese translation, Beijing: People's Music Publishing House, 2012.
- Anthology of Post-Tonal Music. McGraw-Hill, 2007, ISBN 978-0-07-332502-6 (companion volume to Understanding Post-Tonal Music)

=== Articles and Reviews ===
- “From Renaissance to Baroque: Tonal Structures in Tomás Luis de Victoria’s Masses.” Music Theory Spectrum 40/1 (2018): 27-51.
- “A Pedagogical and Psychological Challenge: Teaching Post-Tonal Music to Twenty-First-Century Students.” Indiana Theory Review 33 (2017): 36-68.
- “A Pedagogical and Psychological Challenge: Teaching Post-Tonal Music to Twenty-First-Century Students.” Portuguese translation by Alex Pochat. Teoria e Análise Musical em Perspectiva Didáctica, Salvador (Brazil): UFBA, 2017, pp. 19–46.
- “Approaching the Analysis of Post-1945 Music: Pedagogical Considerations.” Revista Portuguesa de Musicologia 3/1 (2016): 57-78.
- "Los tientos 68, 65 y 67 de Obras de Música: Estudio analítico de tres obras maestras de Cabezón." Anuario Musical 69 (2014): 61–72
- "Tonal Structures in the Magnificats, Psalms, and Motets by Tomás Luis de Victoria." In Estudios. Tomás Luis de Victoria. Studies. Ed. Javier Suárez-Pajares and Manuel del Sol. Madrid: ICCMU, 2013, pp. 145–162.
- "Some Basic Principles of Good Teaching." Music Theory Pedagogy Online, 2013.
- “Semblanzas de Compositores Españoles: Antonio de Cabezón (1510–1566).” Revista de la Fundación Juan March 393, Madrid (March 2010): 2–7.
- “Reply to Ryan McClelland's article 'Teaching Phrase Rhythm through Minuets from Haydn's String Quartets,' vol. 20, 2006.” Journal of Music Theory Pedagogy 21 (2007): 179–82.
- “Procesos compositivos y estructura musical: Teoría y práctica en Antonio de Cabezón y Tomás de Santa María.” In Políticas y prácticas musicales en el mundo de Felipe II (Madrid: Instituto Complutense de Ciencias Musicales, 2004): 393–414.
- “A Theory of Pitch-Class-Set Extension in Atonal Music.” College Music Symposium 41 (Fall 2001): 57–90.
- “Santa María, Tomás de.” New Grove Dictionary of Music and Musicians, 7th ed.
- Diccionario de la Música Española e Hispanoamericana (Dictionary of Spanish and Latin-American Music, Madrid). Articles on “Tañer a consonancias” (“Playing in consonances”) and “Tañer fantasía” (“Playing fantasía”).
- “Paradigms and Contrast in Sixteenth-Century Modal Structure: Commixture in the tientos of Antonio de Cabezón.” Journal of Musicological Research 19 (2000):1–47.
- Review of the Italian book Canone infinito (540 pp.), by Loris Azzaroni. Analisi: Rivista di teoria e pedagogia musicale 30 (1999): 24–31.
- “Dos tientos de Cabezón basados en tonos del Magnificat.” Revista de Musicología 21 (1998): 1–19.
- “Teoría, análisis, crítica: Reflexiones en torno a ciertas lagunas en la musicología española.” Revista de Musicología 18 (1995): 11–25.
- “Harmonic and Formal Processes in Ligeti's Net-Structure Compositions.” Music Theory Spectrum 17/2 (Fall 1995): 242–67.
- Review of Historical Organ Techniques and Repertoires: An Historical Survey of Organ Performance Practices and Repertoires. Vol. 1: Spain, 1550-1830. MLA Notes (September 1995): 297–99.
- “Playing in Consonances: A Spanish Renaissance Technique of Chordal Improvisation.” Early Music (August 1995): 93–103.
- “Modal Paradigms in Mid-Sixteenth-Century Spanish Instrumental Composition: Theory and Practice in Antonio de Cabezón and Tomás de Santa María.” Journal of Music Theory 38/2 (Fall 1994): 247–89.
- Review of Apparitions and Macabre Collage, by György Ligeti. MLA Notes 51/1 (1994): 421–23.
- “En torno a la figura y la obra de Tomás de Santa María: Aclaraciones, evaluaciones, y relación con la música de Cabezón.” Revista de Musicología (Madrid) 15/1 (Spring 1992): 55–85.
- “Bass Emancipation in Sixteenth-Century Spanish Instrumental Music: The Arte de tañer fantasía by Tomás de Santa María.” Indiana Theory Review 9 (Fall 1988): 77–97.

== Compositions ==
- Espejismos (10'): Flute, oboe, clarinet, vibraphone, percussion, piano, harpsichord, violin, viola, cello, tape (1977)
- Suite Apócrifa (12'): Piano (1978)
- Quasi Variazioni (9'): Flute, oboe, clarinet, horn, bassoon, violin, viola, cello, bass, piano, 4 female voices (1979)
- Concierto en Do (10'40”): Double quintet and piano (1979)
- Rondó, op. 5 (12'): Orchestra and chorus (1980)
- Cinco Piezas para Orquestra (17”): Orchestra (1980)
- Conductus (12'30”): Orchestra (1981)
- Playtime, for Three Young Violinists (3'): Three violins (1982)
- Cantata on Dante's Vita Nuova (30'): Baritone, chorus, orchestra (1983)
- Partita for Eight Instruments (14'): Flute, oboe, clarinet, marimba, violin, viola, cello, bass (1983)
- Sonata for Violoncello and Piano (12'): Cello and piano (1984)
- Tres Cantigas d'Amigo (9'): Soprano, percussion quintet (1984)
- Concerto Grosso (14'): Orchestra (1984)
- Diferencias y Fugas (12'): String quartet (1987)
- Easter Toccata (5'40"): Organ (2004)
- Dona eis requiem (In memory of the innocent victims of war and terror) (11'): Chamber orchestra and chamber chorus (2005)
- Antiphon and Psalms for the Victims of Genocide (17'): Chamber orchestra and optional chamber chorus (2005)
- Canticles for a Sacred Earth (16'50"): Double quintet and two percussionists (2006)
- Canticles for a Sacred Earth (18'20"): Orchestra (2006–07)
- Missa pro pace (23'): Mixed chorus and strings (2007)
- Improvisations for Jennifer, nos. 1, 2, and 3: Violin solo (2007)
- Himne a Santa Agnès: Chorus and piano (2008)
- Five Gothic Miniatures (10'): Chorus a cappella (2009)
- Songs of the Infinite (18'30"): Violin and piano (2010)
- Songs of the Infinite (18'30"): Violin and orchestra (2010)
- Missa pro pace (23'): Mixed chorus and organ (2010)
- Orion (12') (Three Astral Poems, no. 1): Orchestra (2011)
- Songs of Light and Darkness (16'): Piano trio (2011)
- Cinco canciones con los ojos cerrados (on poems by Antonio Colinas) (12'): Soprano and piano (2011)
- Desconhort (on a poem by Ramon Llull) (7'): Tenor and string quartet (2012)
- Andromeda (12') (Three Astral Poems, no. 2): Orchestra (2012)
- Perseus (11') (Three Astral Poems, no. 3): Orchestra (2014)
- Three Astral Poems (I. Orion, II. Andromeda, III. Perseus) (35'): Orchestra (2011-2014)
- Un piccolo concerto grosso (3'): Three solo violins and youth string ensemble (2014)
- Chaconne: Of Loss and Hope (5'): String orchestra (2014)
- Perseus (11'): Symphonic band (2014)
- Six Preludes after Chopin (6' 30"): Piano (2015)
- Songs of Light and Darkness (16'): Chamber orchestra (2015)
- The YoYo-Ono Duets (14'15"): Two cellos (2015)
- The YoYo-Ono Duets (10'45"): Two bassoons (2015)
- The Star Spangled Banner: Arrangement for 50 cellos (2015)
- Un piccolo concerto grosso (11'): Three solo violins and string orchestra (2015)
- Sonata, for two guitars (16'): two guitars (2015)
- Kyrie for Humanity (11'30"): 8-voice chorus and saxophone octet (2015)
- Orion (12'): Symphonic band (2015)
- Two Astral Poems (Orion and Perseus) (23'): Symphonic band (2015)
- A Tale of Madness (3'12"): Chamber wind ensemble (13 instruments) (2016)
- Sinfonía, "De profundis" (31'): Orchestra (2016)
- O Canada (2' 40"): cello choir (2016)
- A Tale of Madness (Folía) (4' 50"): symphonic band (2017)
