= Juan Bautista Cabanilles =

Spanish organist and composer

- Born: 6 September 1644
- Origin: Spain
- Died: 29 April 1712 (aged 67)
- Occupations: Organist, composer

Juan Bautista José Cabanilles (also Juan Bautista Josep, Valencian: Joan) (6 September 1644 in Algemesí near Valencia – 29 April 1712 in Valencia) was a Spanish organist and composer at Valencia Cathedral.

== Biography ==
He probably began his musical career as a singer in a choir of a local church. Later he studied to become a priest in the cathedral at Valencia, which included lessons in music. On 15 May 1665, he was named the assistant organist of the cathedral. A year later, upon the death of his predecessor, he became the principal organist. On 22 September 1668 he was ordained as a priest. He kept his position as principal organist for 45 years, but from 1703 on his health often necessitated that a substitute be found. From 1675 to 1677 he also took charge of teaching the children in the cathedral choir. No portrait or likeness of Cabanilles is known to exist; the portrait accompanying certain Facebook pages and other internet articles is of the botanist Antonio José Cavanilles (1745–1804).

== Works ==
Many of Cabanilles's compositions are virtuosic and advanced for their time, but generally, he is in the Spanish tradition of keyboard music following 16th century patterns. The majority of his manuscripts are kept in the Library of Catalonia (Biblioteca de Catalunya) in Barcelona. Numerous compositions for organ (tientos, toccatas, passacaglias, and other works) have survived, as well as a number of works for choirs of up to 13 parts.

== Manuscript sources ==
Tiento de primo tono
Tiento of the first tone (of the Gregorian mode)

Tiento de octavo tono
Tiento of the eighth tone

Gloria Patri et Filio
"Gloria Patri" from Beatus Vir (Valencia Cathedral Choir)

1. Barcelona E-Bc Ms. 729 [antiga cota 890]
  199 folios and 432 pages respectively. It has 152 works. It has 14 works from Pablo Bruna. These are the main sources, along with El Escorial LP 30 of compositions by Pablo Bruna.
2. Barcelona E-Bc Ms. 751.21 [antigo 889]: It has 39 peças. It has 5 compositions from Pablo Bruna and one of José Ximénez.
3. Barcelona E-Bc Ms. 386 [antiga cota 887], [Available on-line]
  360 pages; the manuscript, dated 1722, contains 98 compositions by Cabanilles, the copy made by a fervent admirer.
4. Barcelona E-Bc Ms. 387 [antiga cota 888]
  424 folios; dating from 1694 to 1697, the manuscript consists of 500 entirely by Cabanilles. It has 11 verses de Jusepe Ximénez.
5. Barcelona E-Bc Ms. 1328: Tiento for all manuals by J. Cabanilles;
  Tonada de 5º Tono: Tiento lheno by J. Cabanilles.
6. Barcelona E-Bc Ms. 450: It has 20 works. One work from Sebastian Aguilera de Heredia. It has 4 works of J. Cabanilles.
7. Barcelona E-Bc Ms. 1011: It has 330 works. 3 works from Fr. Pablo Nassarre.
  Tiento de Clarines de 7º Tono by J. Cabanilles
8. Archivo de la Catedral de Astorga (see: Alvarez, 1970)
  Ms. with 55 peças: Francisco Andreu, Cabanilles, Juan Saló, Rafael Llistosellas, Fr. Rafael Crest, Isidro Serrada, Pablo Nassarre, Pablo Rouxa, Sebastián Viladrosa, Francisco Llusá, José Elías.
9. Biblioteca privada de mossèn Cosme Bauzá, in Felanitx (Mallorca)
  Ms. núm. 2 with 2 verses from Pablo Bruna.
10. Monserrat, Arquivo musical, Ms. 76: Tiento 6º tono partido de mano derecha.

== Selected score publications ==
- 1 A – Musici Organici Iohannis Cabanilles, 4 vols., edited by Hyginii Anglés, Barcelona: Biblioteca de Catalunya, 1927–1956.
  Cabanilles Opera Omnia (1927–2008).
  Volume 1 (1927): tientos in various modes.
  Volume 2 (1933): passacalles, paseos, several toccatas, xácara, misc. pieces.
  Volume 3 (1936): various genres.
  Volume 4 (1956): various genres.
- 1 B – The following additional 5 volumes were edited by José Clíment, Barcelona: Biblioteca de Catalunya.
  Volume 5 (1986): tientos 71–90; verses for Magnificat, Pange lingua.
  Volume 6 (1989): tientos 91–110 and miscellaneous verses.
  Volume 7 (1992): tientos 111–130; verses for the Mass, for Marian festivals and for miscellaneous occasions.
  Volume 8 (2006): tientos: 131–150; duo de 1º Tom, Sacris Solemniis.
  Volume 9 (2008): tientos: 151–168; verses.
- 2 – Música de Tecla Valenciana. J. Bta. Cabanilles, 4 vols., edited by Julián Sagasta Galdós, Valencia: Edicions Alfons el Magnánim, 1986–1994.
- 3 – CEKM, vol. 48-1: keyboard music from the Felanitx manuscripts, I, ed. Nelson Lee, 1999. Nearly all of the 162 pieces are by Cabanilles.
- 4 – Juan Cabanilles: Ausgewählte Orgelwerke, edited by Miguel Bernal Ripoll and Gerhard Doderer, Kassel [etc.], Bärenreiter, 2 volumes, 2017.

== Selected recordings ==
- "Joan Bautista Cabanilles: Batalles, Tientos & Passacalles, Jordi Savall, Hespèrion XX – CD Alia Vox 9801
- La Gloria Musical del Barroco Valenciano, 2 CDs. Fundació La Lum de les Imatges (2010).
- Jan Willem Jansen, Los Músicos de Su Alteza: Tientos y Passacalles: Juan Cabanilles (Éditions Hortus, HORT013, ASIN: B00004VHOX).
- Juan Bautista José Cabanilles, Obras de Organo. John Butt at the Greg Harold Spanish-style organ, University of California, Berkeley. CD Harmonia Mundi France HMU 907047.
