= Vilarroig =

Vilarroig is a surname. Notable people with the surname include:

- Guillermo Vilarroig (born 1970), Spanish businessman
- Pedro Vilarroig (born 1954), Spanish composer and academic
