= Teodoro Ballo Tena =

Spanish violinist, composer and conductor

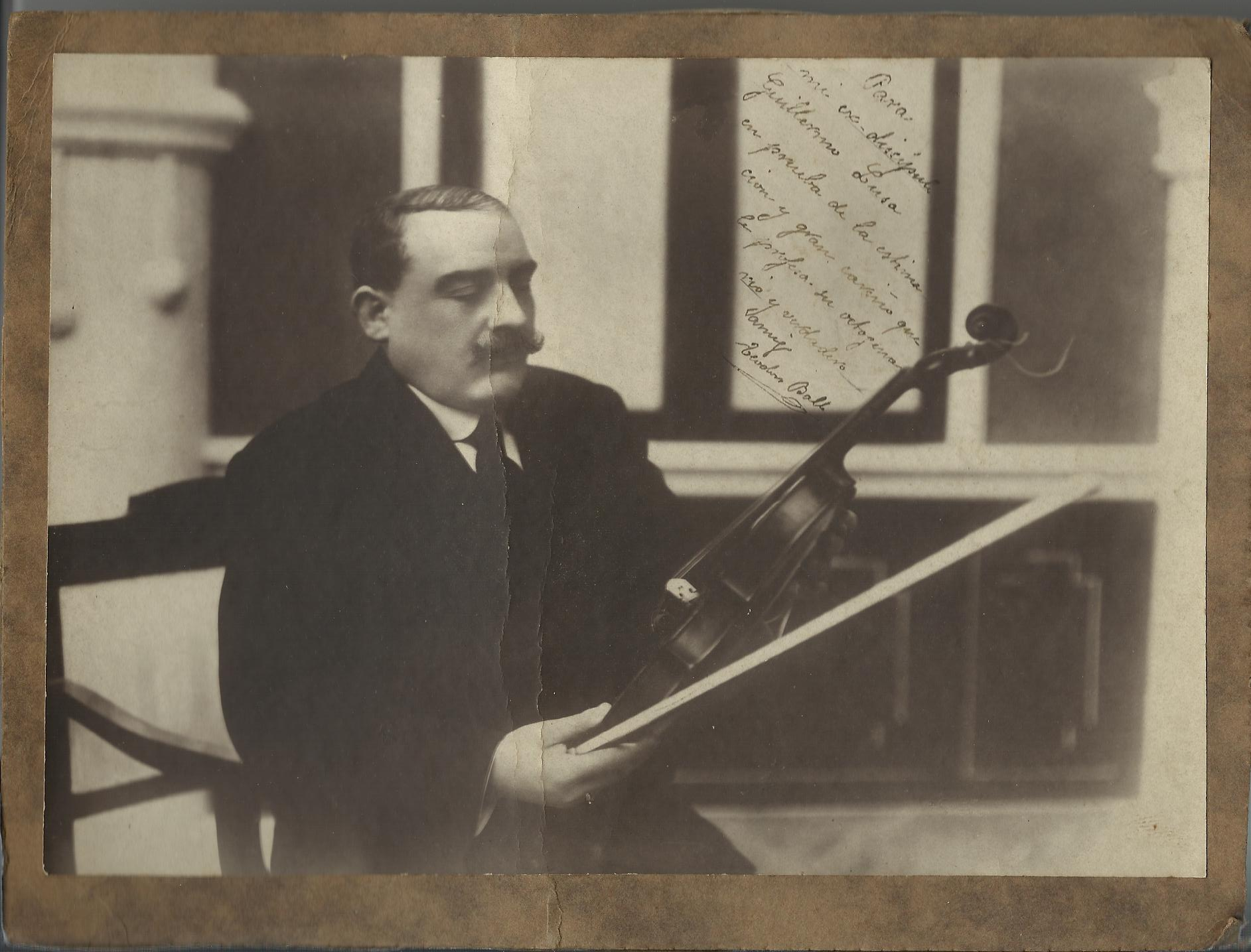
- A photo of Teodoro Ballo dedicated to his student Guillermo Lusa Herrero (Zaragoza, 1917)
- Born: 12 March 1866; Zaragoza, Spain
- Died: 5 August 1963 (96); Zaragoza, Spain
- Resting place: Cementerio de Torrero
- Occupations: Conductor, violinist, composing
- Known for: Composing
- Notable work: himnos patrióticos

Teodoro Bailo Tena (25 March 1866 - 6 August 1962) was a Spanish violinist, composer and conductor.

Tena studied violin at the Conservatory of Zaragoza. He continued to study violin under Jesús de Monasterio and music composition under Aranguren and Santamaria in Madrid.

Tena won first place at the Conservatory of Zaragoza in 1884. He founded the Music School of Zaragoza (la Escuela de Musica de Zaragoza) where he taught Eduardo Viscasillas Blanque and Pablo Luna Carné. He also founded the Philharmonic Orchestra (Orquesta Filarmónica) in Zaragoza in 1890.

Tena composed the himnos patrióticos and a Salve Regina to Our Lady of the Pillar.

== Bibliography ==
- Enciclopedia Espasa Suplemento de los años 1961–62, pág. 136 (ISBN 84-239-4595-2)
- Biografía en la Gran Enciclopedia Aragonesa

== See also ==
- Zarzuela
- Spanish composers
- Jesús de Monasterio
