= Peter of Aragon =

Peter of Aragon may refer to

- Peter I of Aragon and Navarre (c. 1068–1104), King of Aragón and Navarre since 1094
- Ramon Berenguer III, Count of Provence (1158 - 1181), born as Peter of Aragón, Count of the Provence since 1173
- Peter II of Aragon (1178-1213), King of Aragón and Count of Barcelona since 1094
- Peter III of Aragon the Great (1240–1285), King of Aragón since 1276
- Peter of Aragon (died 1296), son of Peter III of Aragon and Constance II of Sicily
- Peter IV of Aragon (1319–1387), King of Aragón since 1336
- Peter of Aragon, Heir of Sicily (1398–1400), Heir Apparent of Sicily and Heir Presumptive of Aragon
- Peter of Aragon, Count of Alburquerque (1406–1438), infante of Aragon, son of Ferdinand I of Aragon
- Peter V of Aragon (1429–1466), constable of Portugal, claimed the throne of Aragon
- Pedro Antonio de Aragón (1611-1690), Viceroy of Naples
