= Charles Burkhart =

American musicologist (born 1928)

Charles Burkhart (born 29 May 1928) is an American musicologist, theorist, composer, and pianist. He holds the title of Professor Emeritus in the Aaron Copland School of Music, Queens College, and the Graduate Center, City University of New York. He is known especially as a scholar in Schenkerian analysis and as a successful lecturer and master class presenter.

== Career ==
Burkhart was a student of Felix Salzer. He holds a M.Mus. degree from Yale University. His M.A. thesis for Colorado College, written in 1952, concentrated on the musical culture of Old Order Amish and of Old Colony Mennonites. Among Burkhart's many students are Channan Willner, Stephen Lindeman, Stephen Slottow, Roy Nitzberg, William Renwick, and Gary S. Karpinski.

== Research ==
Burkhart is known for work on the relations between Schenkerian readings, analysis of rhythm and meter, and implications for performance. Most of the compositions he discusses are for keyboard, especially Bach, Beethoven, and Chopin, but he has also written about opera (Don Giovanni) and song cycles (Schumann's Liederkreis, Op. 39).

A frequently cited article is regarded as the "classic treatment" of motivic parallelisms in Schenkerian analysis. Burkhart introduces the term "Ursatz parallelism"—when a motive in a small span of music (foreground) duplicates one covering a far longer span (background)—but because of its generality (and the abstract nature of the Ursatz) such a figure alone normally does not create significant motivic associations within a composition. Thus, it is more productive to focus on how "motivic parallelisms operate within individual pieces" rather than as symptoms of a tonal system. Burkhart finds that the motivic parallelisms of various surface motives and their "hidden repetitions" in middle-level segments are "much more unusual and interesting." An oft-cited example relates brief motives in the first two bars of Chopin's Nocturne in F♯ major, Op. 15, No. 2, to larger spans: a neighbor-note figure that is also the frame of the melody in bars 1–16; and an arpeggiated chord that is also stretched across bars 1–45. As Burkhart notes, it is common—as in these examples—for the smaller motive to be nested inside the larger parallelism. The limit in breadth of such parallelisms may be found in another oft-cited example: Schubert's "Erlkönig", where Burkhart finds that two motives in the piano's introduction map onto the key sequence of the entire song.

== Publications ==
=== Books ===
- Anthology for Musical Analysis. Co-authored with William Rothstein (6th ed. on). New York, 1964; 7th ed. 2011. ISBN 978-0-495-91607-9.
- A New Approach to Keyboard Harmony. Co-authored with Allen Brings, Leo Kraft, Roger Kamien, and Drora Pershing. New York, 1979. ISBN 978-0-393-95001-4.

=== Articles (selected) ===
- "Stravinsky's Revolving Canon." The Music Review, 29/3 (1968): 161.
- "Debussy plays La Cathédrale engloutie and solves metrical mystery." Piano Quarterly 65 (1968): 14–16.
- "Schoenberg's Farben: An Analysis of Op. 16, no. 3." Perspectives of New Music 12/1–2 (1973): 141–172.
- "The Polyphonic Melodic Line of Chopin's B-minor Prelude." In Preludes, op. 28: An Authoritative Score, Historical Background, Analysis, Views and Comments, edited by Thomas Higgins, 80–88. New York, 1973.
- "Schenker's 'Motivic Parallelisms'." Journal of Music Theory 22/2 (1978): 145–175.
- "The Symmetrical Source of Webern's Opus 5, no. 4." The Music Forum 5 (1980): 317.
- "Schenker's Theory of Levels and Musical Performance." In Aspects of Schenkerian Theory, edited by David Beach, 95–112. New Haven, Connecticut, 1983.
- "Departures from the Norm in Two Songs from Schumann's Liederkreis." In Schenker Studies, edited by Hedi Siegel, 146–164. New York, 1990.
- "How Rhythm Tells the Story in 'Là ci darem la mano'." Theory and Practice 16 (1991): 21–38. JSTOR 41054244
- "Mid-bar Downbeat in Bach's Keyboard Music." Journal of Music Theory Pedagogy 8 (1994): 3–26.
- "Chopin's 'Concluding Expansions'." In Nineteenth-century Piano Music: Essays in Performance and Analysis, edited by David Witten, 95–116. New York, 1997.
- "Remembering David Kraehenbuehl." Journal of Music Theory 41/2 (1997): 183.
- "Meet David Kraehenbuehl." Commonweal: A Review of Religion, Politics, and Culture 131/15 (2004).
- "The Phrase Rhythm of Chopin's A-flat Mazurka, Op. 59, No. 2." In Engaging Music: Essays in Music Analysis, edited by Deborah Stein and William M. Marvin, 3–12. New York, 2005.
- "The Two Curious Moments in Chopin's E-flat Major Prelude." In Structure and Meaning in Tonal Music: Festschrift in Honor of Carl Schachter, edited by L. Poundie Burstein and David Gagné, 5–18. Hillsdale, New York, 2006.
- "The Suspenseful Structure of Brahms's C-major Capriccio, Op. 76, no. 8: A Schenkerian Hearing." In Bach to Brahms: Essays on Musical Design and Structure, edited by David Beach and Yosef Goldenberg, 259–278. Rochester, New York, 2015.

== Compositions ==
Burkhart's compositions include some organ preludes and choruses he has composed and arranged.
