= José Elías =

José Elías (c. 1678 – c. 1755), full name Josep Elias i Verdaguer, was a Catalan organist and composer in the tiento tradition. He may have studied with Juan Cabanilles in Valencia but is first documented as organist in Barcelona at Sant Pere de les Puelles in 1712 and then at SS Justo y Pastor from 1715 to 1725, after which he moved to Madrid to become Capellan de su Majestad and principal organist of the Convent of Las Descalzas Reales. It is unknown whether Joseph Elias, organist from 1739 to 1741 at the Hieronymite monastery of El Parral was the same person.
