= Manuel Rodrigues Coelho =

Portuguese composer (c. 1555–1635)

Manuel Rodrigues Coelho (ca. 1555 – 1635) was a Portuguese organist and composer. He is the first important Iberian keyboard composer since Cabezón.

Coelho was born in Elvas around 1555 and probably received early education at the Elvas Cathedral. He may also have studied at the Badajoz Cathedral, where he worked as organist from 1573 to 1577. At some point during the 1580s, Coelho returned to Elvas and worked at the cathedral there. He left the post in 1602 after becoming court organist at Lisbon. He died in 1635, probably in Lisbon.

The composer's surviving works are preserved in a 1620 print Flores de musica pera o instrumento de tecla & harpa, published in Lisbon. The collection, dedicated to Philip II of Portugal, is the earliest surviving Portuguese keyboard print. It contains 24 tientos, 101 liturgical organ versets (kyries and hymn settings), four settings of the Spanish/Mozarabic version of Pange lingua, and four intabulations of Lassus' Susanne ung jour. This large collection is probably a compilation of earlier composed material.

Coelho's most important compositions are his tientos, which are very long (200–300 bars on average), multi-sectional pieces. Imitative counterpoint has a secondary role in them, whereas motivic figures and figuration, hallmarks of the Baroque style, are in the foreground. The harmonic language is simple and clear in sharp contrast to the contemporary Italian composers (i.e., Ascanio Mayone, Giovanni Maria Trabaci and Girolamo Frescobaldi); the contrapuntal techniques are reminiscent of Sweelinck. Coelho's liturgical pieces are less ornate and generally employ more strict counterpoint. They include a group of 23 versets para se cantarem ao órgâo, "for singing to the organ", which all consist of a vocal line with organ accompaniment.

== Sources ==
- Apel, Willi (1972), The History of Keyboard Music to 1700. Translated by Hans Tischler. Indiana University Press. ISBN 0-253-21141-7. Originally published as Geschichte der Orgel- und Klaviermusik bis 1700 by Bärenreiter-Verlag, Kassel.
- Bernardes, J. M. R. e Bernardes, I. R. S. (2003), Uma Discografia de Cds da Composição Musical em Portugal: Do Século XIII Nossos Dias, INCM. [pp. 114–119].
- Cruz, Maria Antonieta de Lima (1948), Rodrigues Coelho, Lisboa, Ed. Europa, Colecção Os Grande Músicos.
- Hudson, Barton (2001). "Manuel Rodrigues Coelho". In Sadie, Stanley; Tyrrell, John (eds.). The New Grove Dictionary of Music and Musicians (2nd ed.). London: Macmillan Publishers. ISBN 978-1-56159-239-5.
- Kastner, Santiago (1936), Música Hispânica: O estilo do Padre Manuel R. Coelho e a interpretação da música hispânica para tecla desde 1450 até 1650. Lisboa: Editorial Ática.
- Kastner, Macário Santiago (ed.), (1936), P. Manuel Rodrigues Coelho: 5 Tentos, Mainz: Schott’s Söhne.
- Kastner, Macário Santiago (ed.), (1955), P. Manuel Rodrigues Coelho: 4 Susanas, Mainz: Schott’s Söhne.
- Kastner, Santiago (1941), Contribución al estúdio de la música española y portuguesa. Lisboa: Editorial Ática.
- Kastner, Macário Santiago (ed.), (1976/1959), Manuel Rodrigues Coelho: Flores De Musica Pera o Instrumento de Tecla & Harpa, Vol. I [24 Tentos], Portugaliae Musica, Fundação Calouste Gulbenkian, 2.ª edição.
- Kastner, Macário Santiago (ed.), (1961), Manuel Rodrigues Coelho: Flores De Musica Pera o Instrumento de Tecla & Harpa, Vol. II [Kyries, Versos, Susanas, etc.], Portugaliae Musica, Fundação Calouste Gulbenkian.
- Kastner, Macario Santiago (1979), Três Compositores Lusitanos para Instrumentos de Tecla/Drei Lusitanische Komponisten für Tasteninstrumente. António Carreira, Rodrigues Coelho, Pedro de Araújo. Lisboa: Fundação Calouste Gulbenkian, pp. 27–116.
- Mazza, José (1944-1945), Dicionário Biográfico de Músicos Portugueses, ed. e notas de José Augusto Alegria, Ocidente, Lisboa, Tipografia da Editorial Império.
- Nery, Rui Vieira (1984), A Música no Ciclo da Bibliotheca Lusitana, Lisboa, Fundação Calouste Gulbenkian.
- Rocha, Edite Maria Oliveira da (2010), Manuel Rodrigues Coelho “Flores de Música”: Problemas de Interpretação, Tese de Doutoramento, Departamento de Comunicação e Arte, Universidade de Aveiro, Policopiado.
- Vasconcelos, Joaquim de (1870), Os Músicos Portuguezes: Biografia, Bibliografia, 2 volumes, Porto, Imprensa Portugueza.
- Vieira, Ernesto (2007/1900), Diccionario Biographico de Musicos Portuguezes, Lisboa, Lambertini, Edição Facsimilada de Arquimedes Livros.
- Viterbo, Francisco Marques de Sousa (1908), Tangedores da Capella Real: Manuel Rodrigues Coelho, Sep. da Arte Musical. Hello
