= Bohdan Syroyid =

Ukrainian-born Spanish composer

Prof. Dr. Bohdan Syroyid Syroyid
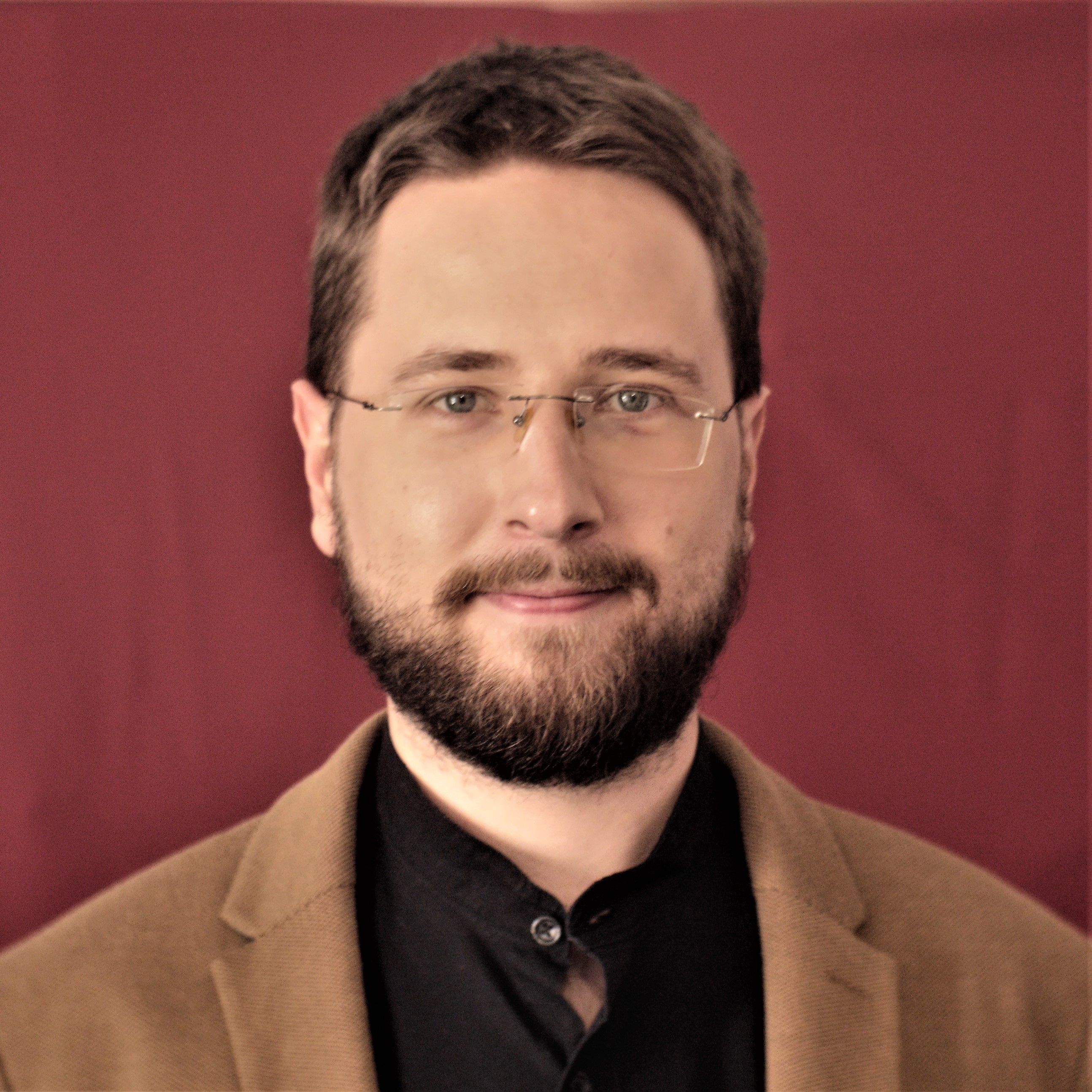
- Syroyid in Albacete, Spain, in August 2020
- Born: Богдан Сироїд; 13 April 1995 (age 31); Lviv, Ukraine
- Occupation: Composer · Author · Professor of Music Education

Academic background
- Education: Higher Conservatory of Music of Málaga (BA), Higher Conservatorio of Castilla-La Mancha (BA), International University of La Rioja (MA), Camilo José Cela University (MA), University of Chichester (MFA), KU Leuven (PhD)
- Thesis: Analysis of Silences in Music: Theoretical Perspectives, Analytical Examples from Twentieth-Century Music, and In-Depth Case Study of Webern's Op. 27/iii (2020)
- Doctoral advisor: Mark Delaere

Academic work
- Discipline: Education
- Sub-discipline: Music Pedagogy, Music Analysis
- Institutions: University of Salamanca, University of Valladolid, University of Castilla-La Mancha, Internacional University of Valencia, Alfonso X El Sabio University
- Website: https://syroyid.com/

Bohdan Syroyid (Ukrainian: Богдан Сироїд, born 13 April 1995) is a Ukrainian-born Spanish composer and professor of music education at the University of Salamanca.

== Career ==
Syroyid was born in Lviv (Ukraine). At the age of six, he began studying piano through private lessons. At the age of seven, he moved to Spain, where he continued his piano studies at the Pablo Ruiz Picasso Elementary Music Conservatory and at the Gonzalo Martín Tenllado Professional Music Conservatory. At the age of fourteen, he was the youngest student to enroll in the bachelor's program of music composition at the Higher Conservatorio of Music of Málaga, where he studied with Jesús Manuel Ortiz Morales and Diana Pérez Custodio. In 2012 he participated as a pianist in the opera staging of Suor Angelica with the staging at the Echegaray Theater in Málaga. In February 2014, he completed his bachelor's degree in music composition with honors obtaining a high distinction awarded by the Musical Foundation of Malaga for the best academic record of the 2013-14 promotion. He received a major commission from the Musical Foundation of Málaga for a piano concerto, titled Capricho Andaluz, which was premiered in 2016 at the Cervantes Theater.

As an active composer he became member of the Association of Composers and Performers of Malaga (ACIM) in 2011 and acted as president of the association between 2015 and 2019. He completed several master degrees in Music Research (2015), Composition for Media (2017) and Educational Leadership (2019). In 2020 the defended his doctoral dissertation titled "Analysis of Silences in Music: Theoretical Perspectives, Analytical Examples from Twentieth-Century Music, and In-Depth Case Study of Webern's Op. 27/iii" in Musicology at KU Leuven, supervised by Prof. Dr. Mark Delaere. Currently, he works as Assistant Professor of Music Education at the University of Salamanca and between 2018 and 2022 he worked as Lecturer of Music Education at the University of Castilla-La Mancha. He also supervises master theses at the Master's Programme on Musical Research at the Valencia International University and the Master's Programme on Pedagogy at the Alfonso X El Sabio University. He has taught at the University of Turku (Finland), the University of Valladolid (Spain), the University of Rhode Island (United States of America), the International University of La Rioja (Spain), and the University of Music and Performing Arts Vienna (Austria).

== Studies ==
- Bachelor's Degree in Music Composition (2014). Higher Conservatory of Music of Malaga (Spain)
- Master's Degree in Musical Research (2015). International University of La Rioja (Spain)
- Master of Fine Arts in Professional Composition and Orchestration (2017). University of Chichester (UK)
- Master's Degree in Educational Management, Innovation and Leadership (2019). Camilo José Cela University (Spain)
- Doctor of Musicology (2020) with dissertation "Analysis of Silences in Music", KU Leuven (Belgium)
- Bachelor's Degree in Classical Piano Performance (2022). Higher Conservatory of Castilla-La Mancha (Spain)

== Music works ==
=== Piano solo ===
- Piano Sonata No. 1 (2010)
- Variations on a Theme by Prokofiev (2011)
- Sonatina (2011)
- Intermezzo for piano (2011)
- Piano Sonata No. 2 (2012)
- Variation on a Theme by Bach, BWV 508 (2012)
- Piano Sonata No. 3 Luna sin Luz (2012)
- Doce Meses (2014)
- Impression (2020)

=== Solo works for various instruments ===
- Miniaturas II for Classical Guitar (2010)
- Balada for Classical Guitar (2011)
- Pájaros del Abismo for B-flat Clarinet or Alto Saxophone (2012)
- Cambio de Luz for a 2-manual Organ with Pedals (2012)
- Duas Lineas for Solo Harpsichord (2013)
- Dicotomías for Solo Viola with Live Electronics (2013)
- Sin Sonido for Solo Oboe (2013)

=== Chamber music ===
- Andante (2010) for Saxophone Quartet
- String Quartet No. 1 (2011)
- Preludio (2011). Piano, 2 Violins and 3 Violas
- Tubarium (2011) for Tuba Quartet
- Nocturno (2012). Quartet for 3 Classical Guitars and Harp
- Intermezzo (2012). Nonet 2 Flutes, Oboe, 2 Clarinets, Tuba, Violin and 2 Prepared Pianos
- Trio (2012). Violin, Violonchelo and Piano
- Lux Aeterna (2012). Quintet for Flute, Clarinet, Violin, Violoncello and Piano
- Clarinet Sonata No. 1 (2012). Clarinet and Piano
- Sin formato (2012) for Tuba Quartet
- Sincronía de Silencio (2013). Nonet for Piano, 2 Flutes, B-flat Clarinet, Bassoon, Tuba, 3 Violins
- Fantasía Concertante (2013). Concerto for Piano and 8 Instruments (2 Flutes, B-flat Clarinet, Bassoon, Tuba, 3 Violins)
- Absolutely broken sky (2014). Decet for Flute/Piccolo, English Horn, B-flat Clarinet/Bass Clarinet, French Horn, B-flat Trumpet, Trombone, Piano, Violin, Viola and Double Bass
- Esperanza sin límite (2019). Quartet for Horn, Double Bass, Drum Set and Piano
- Interruption (2020) for Oboe, Bassoon and Piano
- To the memory of those affected by Covid-19 (2021). Brass ensemble and timpani
- Vesna (2021). Trio for Oboe, Bassoon and Piano
- Kotygoroshko (2022). Trio for Clarinet, Bassoon and Piano

=== Vocal works ===
- Soliloquio (2013) for soprano and 2 percussionists
- Misa Brevis (2014) for STAB Choir and Chamber Orchestra

=== Orchestral ===
- Overture No. 3 "Académica" (2012)
- ¿Caminos perdidos por el bosque? (2013)
- Tot Stellas (2013). Orchestration of Piano Sonata No. 3 Luna sin Luz
- Los bosques de cemento (2014)
- Capricho Andaluz (2016). Concerto for Piano and String Orchestra
- Quijote (2019)

=== Symphonic band ===
- Overture No. 1 "Acuática" (2011)
- Overture No. 2 "Malagueña" (2012)
- Mar sin agua (2013)

== Music awards ==
- 2014 – Winner of the Composition Competition for Wind Band "Maestro Artola" for the work Mar sin agua
- 2015 – Award of the Fundación Musical de Málaga / Musical Foundation of Malaga
- 2015 – Winner of the Composition Competition for Symphonic Orchestra "Emilio Lehmberg" for the composition Los bosques de cemento
- 2021 – Finalist of the International Composition Competition for Harpsichord "Prix Annelie de Man" for the work Duas Lineas

== Publications ==
- Syroyid Syroyid, B. (2022). ¿Por qué se pierde tanto tiempo ante el instrumento? El método de Coso Martínez para aprender a estudiar y tocar un instrumento musical de forma más efectiva. Revista ArtsEduca, 31, 223-236. https://doi.org/10.6035/artseduca.6091
- De Moya Martínez, M. D. V., & Syroyid Syroyid, B. (2021). Music as a Tool for Promoting Environmental Awareness. Experiences of Undergraduate Education Students on the Production of Video Tales in the COVID-19 Pandemic. Education Sciences, 11(10), 582. https://doi.org/10.3390/educsci11100582
- De Moya Martínez, M. D. V., & Syroyid Syroyid, B. (2020). La opinión de los estudiantes de Educación Musical del grado en educación primaria sobre la repercusión del COVID-19 en la actividad formativa del cuento musical. Rastros Rostros, 22(1), 1-18. https://doi.org/10.16925/2382-4921.2020.01.01
- Syroyid Syroyid, B. (2020). CSound como herramienta didáctica para una introducción a la composición electrónica: estudio de caso de una miniatura musical “(In) Harmonic Study”. AV Notas: Revista de Investigación Musical, (9), 106-139. http://hdl.handle.net/10366/148370
- Syroyid Syroyid, B. (2019). The use of silence in selected compositions by Frédéric Devreese: A musical analysis of notated and acoustic silences. Cuadernos de Investigación Musical, (8), 136-159. https://doi.org/10.18239/invesmusic.v0i8.1999
