= Los Músicos de Su Alteza =

Spanish early music ensemble

Los Músicos de Su Alteza is a Spanish early music ensemble founded by the Saragosse harpsichordist Luis Antonio González in 1992. The ensemble has taken a particular lead in recording music from the archives of Zaragoza's two cathedrals, La Seo and El Pilar, and performs regularly at the Música Antigua Aranjuez festival.

== Discography ==
- In Ictu Oculi. Música española del siglo XVII. Arsis, 1996
- La música en La Seo de Zaragoza (Book & CD) Prames
- Joan Cabanilles Tientos Y Passacalles Villancico Mortales que amais. Dorian 1999
- Terra Tremuit. Música española del siglo XVII para la Semana Santa Arsis, 2000
- José de Nebra Miserere scene from El Diablo mudo Ediciones Música Antigua de Aranjuez, 2006. MAA 005
- Joseph Ruiz Samaniego La vida es sueno Alpha 2010
- José de Nebra Amor aumenta el Valor (1728) Alpha 2011
- Il tormento e l'estasi - Luigi Rossi Il peccator pentito Domenico Mazzocchi Pentito si rivolge a Dio. Giacomo Carissimi Jephte Alpha 2012.

The ensemble has also conducted performances of Doña María Bárbara de Portugal, que goza de Dios (1758), Nebra's La divina Filotea (1745), and Siete Palabras de Cristo en la Cruz by Francisco García Fajer.
