= Tiento =

Tiento (Spanish pronunciation: [ˈtjento], Portuguese: Tento [ˈtẽtu]) is a musical genre originating in Spain in the mid-15th century. It is formally analogous to the fantasia (fantasy), found in England, Germany, and the Low Countries, and also the ricercare, first found in Italy. By the end of the 16th century the tiento was exclusively a keyboard form, especially of organ music. It continued to be the predominant form in the Spanish organ tradition through the time of Cabanilles, and developed many variants. Additionally, many 20th-century composers have written works entitled "tiento".

== Name ==
The word derives from the Spanish verb tentar (meaning either to touch, to tempt or to attempt), and was originally applied to music for various instruments. In the early eighteenth century, some composers also used the term obra, originally a more general term meaning "work", to refer to this genre.

== Formal aspects ==
The tiento is formally extraordinarily diverse, more a set of guidelines than a rigid structural model such as fugue or rondo. Nearly all tientos are imitative to some degree, though not as complex or developed as the fugue. This has led to their being associated with the other embryonic imitative forms cited above. Similarly, it is difficult to assign a single style to the form, since it underwent a considerable amount of evolution from its inception to its decline in the late 18th century. The earliest tientos (such as those of Cabezón) were stylistically quite close to the ricercare in their extended use of the strict, motet-style counterpoint. Later (especially in the works of Cabanilles), tientos would frequently alternate between the older style of strict counterpoint, and virtuosic, affective figuration typical of the toccata and some fantasias. The evolution of the form was in part conditioned by the evolution of the Spanish organ, and it eventually came to include several variants or sub-forms, several of which are listed below:

- Tiento de medio registro: A tiento making use of the split keyboard, frequently found on Spanish organs from the mid-16th century on. The split keyboard refers to an organ manual where ranks of pipes may be engaged for half the keyboard, as opposed to the entire compass, which is the norm. This enables the player to utilize different sounds on the same keyboard, generally a solo sound and an accompaniment sound, though occasionally two sounds of equal strength. The tiento de medio registro figures prominently in the oeuvres of Correa de Arauxo, Aguilera de Heredia, and Bruna.
- Tiento de lleno: The opposite of the tiento de medio registro; a tiento played on one sound (full register).
- Tiento de falsas: A tiento making frequent use of dissonance, so as to achieve particularly dramatic effect. "Falsas" refers to "false notes," or dissonant tones not part of the current mode or key. It is similar to the Italian idea of Durezze e ligature (consonance and dissonance).
- Tiento pleno: an irregular tiento consisting of three sections: a prelude, fugue, and postlude. It has more in common with the German praeludium than with other tientos.

== Composers ==
- Antonio de Cabezón (1510–1566)
- António Carreira (ca. 1520/30– fl. 1587/97)
- Bernardo Clavijo de Castillo (1545–1626)
- Manuel Rodrigues Coelho (1555–1635)
- Sebastián Aguilera de Heredia (1561–1627)
- Francisco de Peraza (1564–1598)
- Gaspar Fernandes (1566–1629)
- Estacio de Lacerna (ca. 1570–after 1616)
- Francisco Correa de Arauxo (1584–1654)
- José Ximénez (1601–1672)
- José Perandreu (fl. mid–17th century)
- Pablo Bruna (1611–1679)
- Juan Cabanilles (1644–1712)

== Contemporary composers ==
- Jean Langlais (1907–1991): includes a tiento as movement 2 of his Suite Médiévale (1947)
- Maurice Ohana (1913–1992): composed a Tiento for guitar (1957)
- Benet Casablancas (1956) has recently (2012) written a Tiento for organ based on the Lutheran chorale Frisch auf, mein' Seel', verzage nichte a part of the Orgelbüchlein Project.
- Carlotta Ferrari (1975) has published three Tientos for Organ: Tiento de lleno, Tiento de falsas and Tiento de batalla (IMSLP 2015).
