= Gracia Baptista =

Spanish nun and composer

Personal life
- Notable work: Conditor alme (1557)
- Occupation: Nun, composer

Religious life
- Religion: Catholic
- Denomination: Roman Catholic

Gracia Baptista (fl. 1557?) was a Spanish Roman Catholic nun and composer who lived in Ávila. Her setting of Conditor alme, published in 1557 in the Libro de cifra nueva para tecla, Arpa y Vihuela of Luis Venegas de Henestrosa, is the earliest keyboard work by an Iberian woman composer, the first published composition by a woman composer, and possibly the only surviving published keyboard work by an Iberian woman dating to before the eighteenth century. The piece is scored for voice and either organ or harpsichord. It has been recorded.
