= Diego Xaraba =

Spanish organist and composer

Diego Xaraba (1652–1715) was a Spanish organist and composer. A nephew of organist Pablo Bruna, Xaraba studied with him at Daroca. He is known to have been working as the organist of El Pilar in Zaragoza in around 1676; he was later employed in the chapel of Carlos II in Madrid, where he died. A few of his organ works have been recorded.
