= Pablo Nassarre =

Spanish organist, composer and music theorist

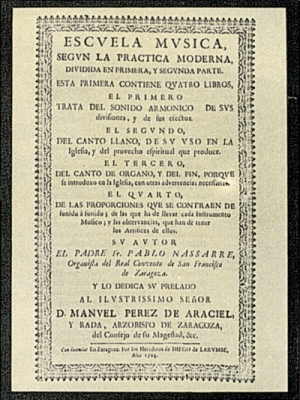
Front cover of:Escuela Música según la práctica moderna

Pablo Nassarre (or Nasarre; 1650–1730) was a Spanish priest, organist, and Baroque composer. His work, Escuela Música según la práctica moderna, made him an important theorist of the Baroque era.

== Life ==
Nassarre was born blind in Alagón, Zaragoza, in 1650. He moved to Daroca to be taught by Pablo Bruna, also a blind composer. At age 22, Nassarre became a Franciscan and joined the Royal Convent of San Francisco in Zaragoza, where he was the organist until his death.

He also opened a school of harmony and counterpoint, where José de Torres and Joaquín Martínez de la Roca were his students.

== Work ==
=== Writings ===
- Escuela Música según la práctica moderna (1723 - 1724)
- Fragmentos músicos (1683)

=== Surviving compositions ===
- Arde en incendio de amor - A carol written in 1685.
- Three toccatas for organ
