= José Enrique Ayarra =

Spanish Catholic priest and organist (1937–2018)

José Enrique Ayarra Jarne
- Born: April 23, 1937; Jaca, Spain
- Died: March 18, 2018 (aged 80); Seville, Spain
- Education: Institut Catholique de Paris; Pontifical University of Salamanca
- Occupations: Organist; Catholic Priest
- Known for: Organist, Cathedral of Seville
- Style: Classical

José Enrique Ayarra Jarne (April 23, 1937 - March 18, 2018) was a Spanish Catholic priest and organist. He was most noted for being the principal organist of the Seville Cathedral from 1961 until his death in 2018.

Ayarra earned the title of piano teacher from the Conservatory of Saragossa at the age of 11. He earned degrees in Gregorian Chant and Organ from the Institut Catholique de Paris. Ayarra completed a degree in theology at the Pontifical University of Salamanca.

Ayarra died in Seville at the age of 80 from a cerebral hemorrhage.
