= José Ximénez =

Spanish composer and organist

José Ximénez, José Jiménez or Jusepe Ximénez (baptized 25 December 1601; died 9 August 1672) was a Spanish organist and the composer of 23 surviving works. Born in Zaragoza, he became the assistant of Sebastian Aguilera de Heredia in 1620 and succeeded him as principal organist at La Seo after the latter's death in December 1627. In 1654 he turned down an appointment to the royal chapel in Madrid, and seems to have spent the rest of his life in Saragossa.

Ximénez's works have appeared in collections by F. Pedrell: (Antología de organistas clásicos españoles, i Barcelona, 1908) and H. Anglés: (Antología de organistas españoles del siglo XVII, i–ii Barcelona, 1965–6). A collected edition by Willi Apel appeared as vol. 31 of Corpus of Early Keyboard Music.

== Notes ==
Hudson, Barton (2001). "José Ximénez". In Sadie, Stanley; Tyrrell, John (eds.). The New Grove Dictionary of Music and Musicians (2nd ed.). London: Macmillan. ISBN 978-1-56159-239-5.
