= Tomás de Santa María =

Spanish music theorist, organist and composer

Fr. Tomás de Santa María O.P. (also Tomás de Sancta Maria) (c. 1510 – 1570) was a Spanish music theorist, organist and composer of the Renaissance. He was born in Madrid but the date is highly uncertain; he died in Ribadavia. Little is known about his life except that he joined the Dominican order of friars in 1536, he was employed as an organist in various locales in mid-century, and he published his major work, Arte de tañer fantasía, in Valladolid in 1565.

This book is a comprehensive work on keyboard technique of the time. Its principal aim is to teach how to improvise in a fugal style, but to get to that point, difficult to the most accomplished musicians of any age, he includes detailed treatments of the rudiments of music, the eight church modes, ornaments, touch, articulation, fingering, and counterpoint, including a categorization of four-note chords, rather similar to what Pietro Aron had written several decades before in Italy (which work he may have used as a source). The classification of chords is especially significant for this is the period in music history during which composers began to think in terms of harmonic progression as a generative mechanism rather than purely the happenstance of intersecting, independent melodic lines. Santa María's book also gives instruction for creating music using the paired imitation technique of Josquin des Prez, who he clearly held to be the master of the style.

Santa María's writings were influential both inside of Spain and throughout the rest of Europe, as can be seen by the numerous early Baroque music theorists (for example Dámaso Artufel and Pietro Cerone) who plagiarized him. The preface to the 1565 edition mentions that the influential clavichordist and organist Antonio de Cabezón (and his brother Juan de Cabezón) examined the treatise and approved it.
