= Guillermo Vilarroig =

- Guillermo Vilarroig
- Born: May 24, 1970; Barcelona, Spain
- Occupation(s): Chairman, Sempo Spain - co-founder and director of Overalia
- Website: http://www.sempo-spain.com/ http://www.overalia.com/

Guillermo Vilarroig (born May 24, 1970, Barcelona, Spain) is the chairman and key promoter of SEMPO Spain and co-founder and current Director of San Sebastian-headquartered Web analytics and search engine visibility company Overalia. Vilarroig is known as a key speaker and participant in industry events like Search Engine Strategies, Googleplex summits, Online Marketing Expo and others. He has been featured extensively in the printed media and on national TV and is regarded as an industry pioneer in his fields of expertise.

He is married and has a son.
