= Peter of Aragon (died 1296) =

Peter of Aragon (Catalan: Pere d'Aragó, Spanish: Pedro de Aragón; died 30 August 1296) was an infante (royal prince) of Aragon, being the sixth and youngest child of King Peter III of Aragon and Queen Constance II of Sicily.

== Life ==
Peter was born around 1270 or 1275. remained in Spain after 1283, when his mother and brothers moved to Sicily. After his brother Alfonso III became king in 1285, Peter frequently acted as his lieutenant. In 1288, he accompanied Alfonso to Oloron for meetings with Edward I of England, which resulted in the Treaty of Canfranc. Alfonso dispatched him to Majorca with Ramon d'Anglesola to defend the island from a possible French invasion.

In 1291, Peter served as regent between the death of Alfonso III and the arrival of James II from Sicily. On 28 August 1291, he married Guillelme, daughter of Viscount Gaston VII of Béarn. She had previously been betrothed to Sancho IV of Castile. Fulfilling the terms of the Treaty of Anagni (1295), James charged Peter with handing over the captive sons of Charles II of Naples.

Acting on his own initiative, Peter intervened in the Castilian succession conflict on the side of the Infantes de la Cerda. On 21 January 1296 in Bordalba, he met with Alfonso de la Cerda and Juan Núñez II de Lara to organize an invasion. Peter was promised the lordship of Cuenca, Alarcón, Moya and Cañete. He crossed the frontier with a large army, besieged and captured León and laid siege to Mayorga. Henry the Senator proposed, to resolve the conflict, that Pedro marry the Castilian regent, María de Molina, widow of Sancho IV, in spite of the fact that he was already married. Nothing came of this.

Peter died at Tordehumos on 30 August after a short illness, with the siege of Mayorga ongoing. Ramon d'Anglesola, who had accompanied him, died around the same time. According to the Chronicle of Ramon Muntaner:

And the Lord Infante, in his illness, did in due order all that a good Christian should do; he received all the sacraments of Holy Church very devoutly, like a good Christian and chaste and pure as he was. He had never known any woman but my Lady Guillerma de Moncada, his wife. And as he passed from this life, he made as beautiful an end as any Christian of the world could; he begged all that no mourning be made for him until the host had returned to Aragon with his body, and that En Ramon de Anglesola be buried at his feet, as one who, in life and death, had been a faithful companion to him.

Peter's body was brought back for burial in the Franciscan Friary in Zaragoza. He had no children. Guillelme survived him until about 1309 and also died childless.

== Works ==
According to the Portuguese troubadour Fernão Rodrigues Redondo, Peter of Aragon wrote several lais (narrative poems). This information is found in a poem addressed to Peter, Don Pedro este cunhado del-Rei, where it is indicated that Peter made a trip to Portugal, where his sister, Elizabeth, was queen. The term lai, derived from French, appears nowhere else in the Portuguese troubadour corpus. Some scholars have identified Pedro's lost lais with the Arthurian Lais de Bretanha, but, as Fernão does not reveal the content of Peter's lais, this is mere speculation.

== Bibliography ==
- Bertrán Roigé, Prim (2022). "Pedro de Aragón". Diccionario Biográfico Español. Real Academia de la Historia.
- García Fernández, Manuel (1998). "La política internacional de Portugal y Castilla en el contexto peninsular del tratado de Alcañices 1267–1297: relaciones diplomáticas e dinásticas". Revista da Faculdade de Letras: Historia. 15 (2): 901–943.
- Goodenough, Henrietta Margaret, ed. (1920). The Chronicle of Muntaner. The Hakluyt Society.
- Gutiérrez García, Santiago (2015). "Arthurian Literature in Portugal". In David Hook (ed.). The Arthur of the Iberians: The Arthurian Legends in the Spanish and Portuguese Worlds. University of Wales Press. pp. 58–117.
- Pepin, Paulette Lynn (2016). María de Molina, Queen and Regent: Life and Rule in Castile-León, 1259–1321. Lexington Books.
- Rio Riande, María Gimena del; Rossi, Germán Pablo (2015). "Apuntes para a la reconstrucción filológico-musicológica de los lais de Bretaña gallego-portugueses: El caso del anónimo D'un amor eu cant' e choro (B4, V^{a}4)". Revista del Instituto de Investigación Musicológica "Carlos Vega". 29: 89–118.
- Salazar y Acha, Jaime de (2021). Las dinastías reales de España en la Edad Media (PDF). Real Academia de la Historia.
