= Franciscan Friary, Zaragoza =

Community of Franciscan monks in Spain

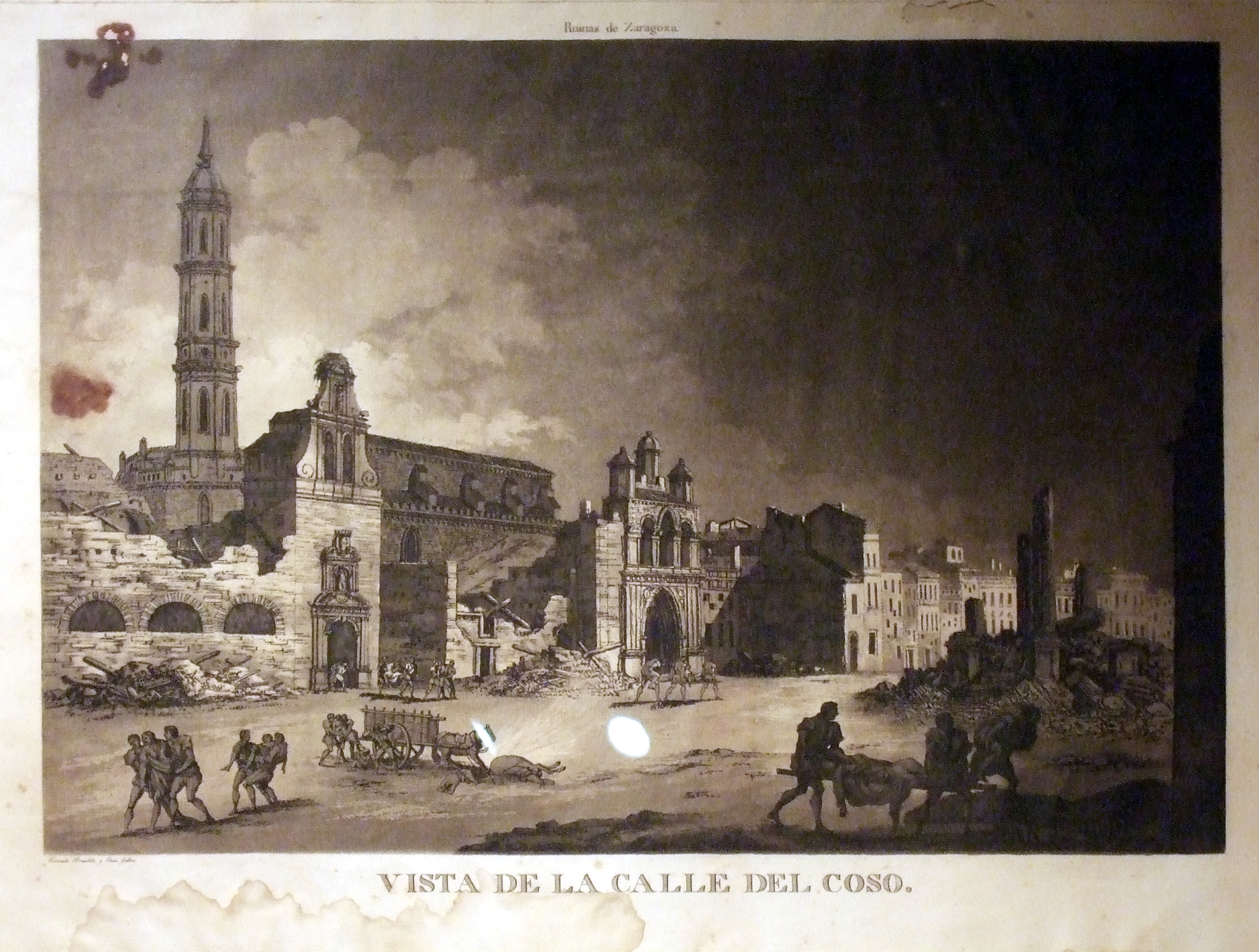
- Franciscan Friary of Zaragoza

- Location within Aragon Location within Spain

Monastery information
- Established: 1219
- Controlled churches: Franciscan

People
- Founders: Aragonese royal family

Site
- Location: Zaragoza, Aragon, now Spain
- Coordinates: 41°39′08″N 0°52′54″W
- Visible remains: Demolished

The Franciscan Friary in Zaragoza, Aragon (Spain) (Spanish: Convento de San Francisco de Zaragoza) was established in 1219. Unusually opulent for a Franciscan community, it benefitted greatly from royal patronage, and several members of the Aragonese royal family were buried in its magnificent church.

== History ==
The convent was founded by the infante Peter of Aragon in 1219, although with the damage it received during the Napoleonic French invasion and French sieges of Zaragoza was almost completely ruined. Its church was magnificent and provided a single nave measuring 246 feet long by 75 latitude.

That circumstances of that foundation were as follows. In 1219, eleven years after the establishment of its order, entered in Zaragoza the disciples of Saint Francis of Assisi occupying at first which then went home of Augustinians: in 1280 they moved into their new mansion begun under the auspices of an infante and concluded in 1357 with the protection of king Pedro IV of Aragon, which gave them his orchard having contributed not a little to lift the benefactor of religious Pedro Cornel. The endless works of the church was given an end in 1399.

The History of the Royal Convent is in great part the history of the Franciscan Province of Aragon, spiritual centre that nurtured of spiritual bonanza to many other convents in Spain.

Of this convent of Zaragoza arise the religious that founded the first Observant convent in the town of Manzanera, in 1378: friar Raimundo Sanz, friar Sancho de Fababuj and friar Antonio Monrós.

The War of the Napoleonic French invasion of 1808 leaves very much ravaged the convent building; still persists the slender Mudéjar tower of the church, of three bodies, where can be seen the central nave of the church and its two lateral bodies for the chapels that are among the sections that form the buttresses, and the gateway to the convent, crowned with three Mudéjar turrets, as make evident an engraving of the time, which still it see remains of the Cross of the Coso in front of the facade of the convent are appreciated. In the next onslaught of the invading troops, the devastating work of the French mines to break the siege was very much worse the damage.

From its ruins, it get a new convent, which prolongs its existence until 1835, then this preserved the famous arch of the choir that the French left for sample of what had been there, and the sumptuous interior hall of the convent where the religious fitted out church for worship after have been completed that war. After unfortunately Juan Álvarez Mendizábal decreed its extinction, selling in small parts to individuals.

== The church and tombs ==
This magnificent church contained the tombs of some prominent figures, since there rested the generous founder of the building, the infante Peter of Aragon, who was son of King Peter III of Aragon "The Great" and brother of king James II of Aragon "The Just", having died prematurely in 1296 in Castilian lands while fighting in favor of the infantes of la Cerda.

Was also buried in the church of the convent Queen Teresa d'Entença, which was the first wife of the king Alfonso IV of Aragon "The Nice" and the mother of Peter IV of Aragon "The Ceremonious", resting besides along said queen her children Isabel and Sancho, who died in infancy. This queen died in 1327 while giving birth to her son Sancho, and was buried a side of the chancel and in a mausoleum of marble supported by six lions with her effigy in dress of religious and with figures crying around the tomb. And the tombs of her sons were painted on wood, being the infanta Isabel dressed of clare and the infante Sancho with a garland and the hair loosed.

From the scaffold placed under the Arc of Toledo were moved with more than two centuries interval to the church of the convent of San Francisco the bodies of the favourite Bernaldo de Cabrera and the patrician Juan de Lanuza.
