= Pedro Vilarroig =

Spanish engineer and composer (born 1954)

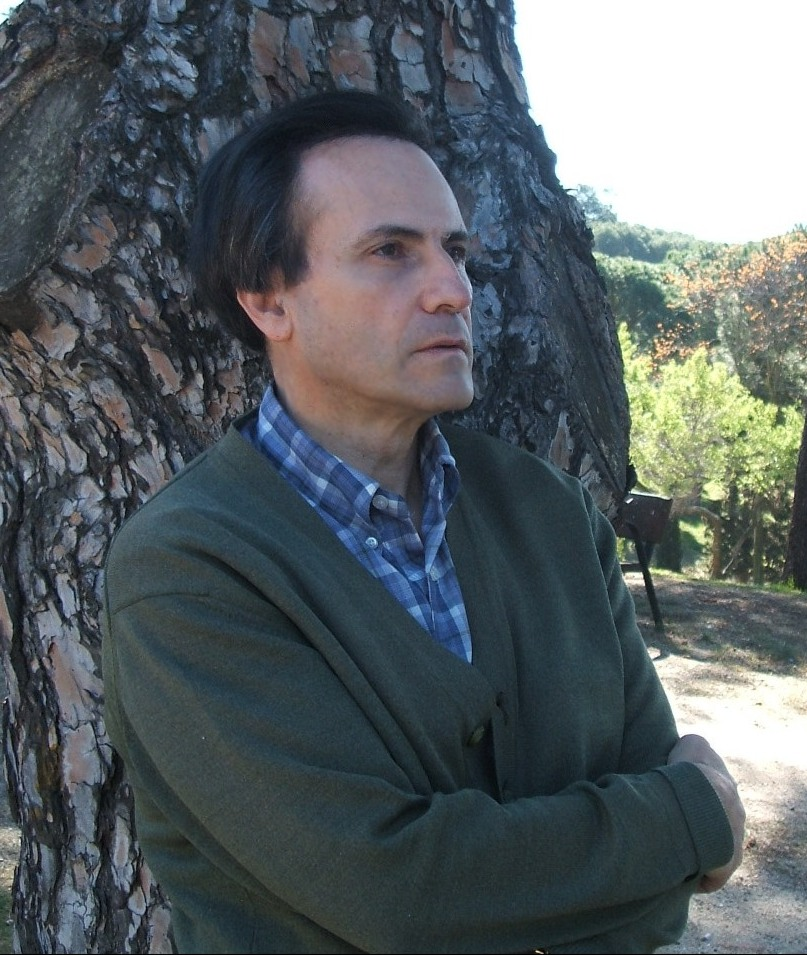

Background information
- Born: November 8, 1954; Madrid, Spain
- Genre: Classical
- Occupations: Composer, Engineer

Pedro Vilarroig (born November 8, 1954) is a professor of physics and cosmology at the Universidad Politécnica of Madrid and a former Spanish composer. He is a proponent of neotonalism, having founded and led the Asociación Española de Compositores Neotonales (Spanish Association of Neotonal Composers).

== Biography ==
Vilarroig was born in Madrid in 1954. His mother was a violinist and his father a painter. As a child, he often used to paint while listening to music. By this means, he heard a great deal of music by the great masters of classicism, who noticeably influenced him. While going for long walks, he would often hear new music in his head. Vilarroig graduated with a doctorate in Mining Engineer, and entered the Real Conservatorio Superior de Música of Madrid in 1973 when he was 19 years old (most of the Conservatory's students enter as young children).

When Vilarroig had finished his studies, he joined the Laboratorio de Interpretación Musical (Music Performance Lab) LIM for two years acting as a collaborator, performer and composer in electroacoustics.

Founder of the Asociación Musical Verda Stelo, he conducted a choir and a chamber orchestra for seven years. He read choral studies with the Czech professor Petr Fiala, participated in a composition workshop conducted by Carmelo Bernaola, conducted choirs in courses organized by the Federación Coral of Madrid, and wrote incidental music for courses led by Eduardo Armenteros and José Miguel Martínez at the SGAE in Madrid.

He has composed chamber and symphonic music, soundtracks for shorts, and has had other commissions for soundtracks, among them an audiovisual for the Spanish Foreign Office and two for the Natural Sciences National Museum of Madrid. Though he has composed numerous works for electroacoustics, his style is neotonal with many influences, including Mahler, Prokofiev, Shostakovich and Sibelius.

He is founder and president of the Asociación Española de Compositores Neotonales and he was the president of the Federación Coral de Madrid from 1999 to 2008. He has also taught Physics and Cosmology at the Universidad Politécnica of Madrid since 1980.

Composers' early works often consist of chamber pieces whereas orchestral works are composed later. This is the case of Vilarroig who made some pieces for piano as well as duos, but he soon started his symphonic works, managing to compose seven symphonies and a concerto for piano and orchestra between 1975 and 1990. Nevertheless, the premiere of his second symphony did not take place until 2009 when it was performed by the Heredia Symphony Orchestra (Costa Rica) conducted by Eddie Mora. The critic Andres Saenz commented that the work "was finished when the composer was 22 years old. The symphony is composed of four movements and deploys a fully tonal harmonic language with some influences from composers as Mahler, Sibelius and Shostakovich, but mainly he has a look at the late post-Romantic period (end of the 19th century and beginning of the 20th). In this decade (1970), when both the academy and the avant garde loathed the tonality, the young Vilarroig gathered up his courage giving the cold shoulder to atonality, represented by serialism and dodecaphonism. That way, the musical flow unfolds a view supported by a wide thematic body-language in a heroic and passionate spirit that states an underlying metaphor of fight and overcoming with an optimistic end.". Recordings of his third and eight symphonies took place in Moscow (2008) performed by the State Radio and Television Symphony Orchestra of Russia (conducted by Victor Ivanov), and his Concerto for piano and Orchestra in Prague was recorded by the pianist Luis Fernando Perez in 2006 and premiered in Madrid in November 2008. Later works, such as his Concerto for Saxophone and Orchestra, were performed in the first decade of the 21st century (Rivas, performed by Joaquín Franco).

He quit writing music in 2018 and he does not have any relationships with the music world at the present time.

== Style ==
Pedro Vilarroig has a style that merges several tendencies. He does not repudiate tonality, atonality, modality nor fusions with other modern music such as jazz, new age, film music and electroacoustics. It is difficult to label him as neo-romantic or neo-classical since his works can differ radically from each other. One commentator described his musical style as one of "genre mixing", while reviewer Andrés Ruiz Tarazona notes that his musical style follows an "eclectical concept", with "variegated aesthetics, almost always inside the tonal area". There are people who express the view that this can lead to an impersonal method of composition, but it is necessary to listen to a substantial number of works to appreciate that there is a real personality beyond this mixture. A good example for comparison could be Steven Spielberg, who directs movies in different genres such as science fiction (ET, Jurassic Park), history (Schindler's List) and drama (The Color Purple). In all these films a strong Spielberg's personality can be appreciated.

Vilarroig is very interested in his own spiritual development and his search for answers is displayed in such works as his symphony nº 3. This symphony has a dark tone that contrasts with the subsequent ones. In some sense his music is a narrative of his own life. Most of the people that listen to his music agree with the idea that it sounds descriptive and near to film music.

He has also made an audiovisual presentation called "Cosmological suite". About it, we can say that, basically conceived from the musical point of view, Vilarroig's audio-visual showed dramatic pictures about some aspects of the Universe for 49 minutes.

== Records ==
- Three symphonies for orchestra published in audio tape.
- Coauthor of the collection «Happy Baby» in CD for babies, with adaptations of classical pieces, as well as his own works with the general title Variations about six child songs.
- CD titled "Venite Adoremus" by the choir Matritum Cantat with the carol Camino de Belén va una estrella.
- Anniversary of the creation of the choir Villa de las Rozas with the work Wo leia sawola ni.
- CD titled "Ave María" by the choir Surá of Costa Rica with his Ave María.
- CD titled "Concerto for Piano and Orchestra" with the Praga Symphony Orchestra with the works:
  - String Quartet
  - Sonata for Alto Saxophone and Piano
  - Concerto for Piano and Orchestra, Luis Fernando Perez, pianist
- CD together with the Russian composer Andrei Petrov and Eddie Mora (from Costa Rica) with his Symphony nº 3 "Philosophical" recorded in Moscow with the State Radio and Television Symphony Orchestra. Both are under the record label Verso.

== Appraisal, press releases and radio ==
- University radio (Costa Rica)
- Aldeas infantiles' review
- Valladolid daily
- Las Rozas
- Tribuna review
- Press release of Wake up & dream
- Soria Herald
- El Pais
- ABC
- Toro
- Scherzo review
- Radio Universidad Clasica, (Costa Rica) with the full broadcasting of his String Quartet nº 1 and his Concerto for Piano and Orchestra
- Voice of Russia (interview)
- Radio Clásica
- Broadcasting in Radio Clásica of his whole work Concerto for Piano and Orchestra (the same day).
- Tonality comes back
- Cadena Ser (Guadalajara)
- COPE
- Radio Clásica
- Mas espectáculo (web site)
- Cadena Ser (Jaén)

== Courses and lectures ==
- Computer Generated Sound and Music Fractals (electroacoustics) and Consciousness Geometry at the Civil Engineer Association.
- Introduction of the software Ondaedit, for the generation of arbitrary shaped sound, at the Contemporary Music Spreading Center (CDMC). This software was created by himself.
- Application of Astronomical data for the Musical Composition, at the CDMC also.
- He took part in the Film Music Workshop carried out at the SGAE facilities with the introduction of the software TCFilm, also developed by himself and used for image and score synchronization in a film.

== Books ==
- 1. Cosmology:
  - Title: Principles of Cosmology and Astrophysics. Applications of the General Theory of Relativity (Spanish language), ISBN 84-95063-35-2
- 2. Physics of sound:
  - 1. Title: Fourier Theory from its applications' point of view (Spanish language), ISBN 84-921166-2-5.
  - 2. Title: Physical harmony. The scientific basis of music (Spanish language), ISBN 978-84-692-4546-0.

== Commissioned and compulsory Works ==
- I Festival Coral de Las Rozas. Compulsory work: Wo leia sawola ni.
- XIV Certamen de Canción Castellana Villa de Griñón. Compulsory work: Campos de Castilla (2005).
- II Competition Rivas en Canto. Compulsory works: Si me hallaras vacío, based on a poem by the poet José Luis Morante (2007),
- Course about chamber music. More compulsory works have been Sonata for Strings and his String Quartet in the Chamber Music Course organized by Angel del Palacio, regular conductor of the Universidad Rey Juan Carlos orchestra, that took place in Toro in August, 2006. Compulsory work: Sonata for Strings and String Quartet. (references: King Juan Carlos University,)
- Matritum Choral meeting. Compulsory work: Ave María.
- The Sonata for Piano and alto Saxophone is included and recommended by the Real Conservatorio Superior de Música of Madrid in the repertoire for saxophone.
- Two works for boy voices, The Garden and Bells of Madrid ordered by Félix Redondo, conductor of the Children Choir of the Comunidad de Madrid.
- Two sacramental works: In Paradisum and Dies Irae requested by the Cantiere Vocale Utrecht Choir.
- Symphony poem Mercury, requested because of the Almadén mines anniversary.

== Concerts and premieres ==
=== 1983 ===
First premiere with the LIM for the work Ondas 1 (Waves I), for audio tape and three synthesizers.

=== 1991 ===
He participated in the theatre and music show «Hydros», that took place in Segovia, with several snippets of his composition for electroacoustics 1980S26 The Saturn’s New Satellite.

=== 1992 ===
Zodiac Suite performed by the pianist Javier R. Van-Baumbergen in 1992 at the Mining School of Madrid.

=== 1994 ===
- his work Lux Æterna for choir and brass ensemble was premiered in the concert of the First Choir Conducting Course by the Grup Reial de Metall conducted by Francisco Serra.
- First cantata for choir and orchestra La Profil´de viaj spuroj in Esperanto language, that was performed for the first time by the choir Verda Stelo and the Valencia Symphony Orchestra at the Palau de la Música of this town.

=== 1995 ===
Esferas (Spheres), for string quartet and electroacoustics, at the Auditorio del Centro de Arte Reina Sofía.

=== 2000 ===
A piano and saxophone sonata was performed by Joaquín Franco and Blanca Calvo, both of them teachers at the Conservatory of Madrid. From this event, and ordered by the saxophone professor, Joaquín Franco, he composed a concerto for saxophone and orchestra.

=== 2004 ===
- A sonatina for violin and piano ordered by the duo Blanca Calvo (piano) and Joan Espina (Second violins Principal of the National Orchestra of Spain).
- Premiere at the cinema hall of Hervás (Cáceres) with the work Cosmological Suite, an audiovisual presentation by means of computer generated animation, also introduced in the new technologies festival Maquinarte at the Auditorium of Cáceres, Alcobendas, Museo de las Ciencias de Castilla La Mancha (Cuenca) and Centro Cultural Gaya Nuño (Soria).

=== 2005 ===
- The choral meeting Matritum Cantat, organized by the city council of Madrid, took place. There, the participating choirs sang his Ave Maria for mixed choir as the compulsory work.
- 25th Anniversary of the creation of the Laboratorio Oficial José María de Madariaga. Closing concert with his Saxophone Quartet performed by the Joaquín Franco Quartet.

=== 2006 ===
- He organized a concert in the chamber hall of the Auditorio Nacional. In this concert his Wind Quintet was performed among works of several Spanish composers. The event was a great success.
- Two concerts with the String Quartet performed by the group «Cuarteto Neotonal» (Centro cultural Nicolás Salmerón and Junta de Distrito Centro).
- The Sonata for alto saxophone and piano was also performed in October 2006 at the Instituto Cervantes of New York by Joaquín Franco and Jesús María Gómez.

=== 2007 ===
- Soundtrack of the show Más Abajo del Aire, a theatre work with the same name by Sergio Masís. It took place in May 2007, at the Universidad Nacional of Costa Rica.
- Premiere of Paisajes (Landscapes) (flute and guitar version) by the guitar player Claudio Ferrer and the flautist Helena Ramos at the Conservatorio Teresa Berganza of Madrid
- Electroacoustics concert in the auditorium of the Reina Sofía center with the works “Black hole” y “Supernova” from the Cosmological Suite, both broadcast by Radio Clásica.
- Intervenes in the Chamber Orchestra Conducting Course with his work “Interlude” (Toro, Spain).
- Performance of his string quartet nº 1 in two concerts in the Classicals in Summer cycle of the Comunidad de Madrid.
- Premiere of his work Variations about the gloss by Alonso de Mudarra, performed by the chamber ensemble “Arpista Ludovico”, with Mª Rosa Calvo Manzano, at the Museo Nacional de Artes Decorativas.
- Premiere of his First Sonata for Piano at the General Studies School of the San José Faculty of Arts, Lincoln School and Music School Auditorium of Turrialba (Costa Rica).
- Premiere of the work Panegiricum Cupro, a request for the VII Science Week in Madrid. Assembly-room of the Mining School.
- Premiere of the work Bells of Madrid. Introduction of the disk by the Madrid Community Children Choir, accompanied by performers from the Madrid Community Orchestra and broadcast by Telemadrid.

=== 2008 ===
- Premiere of his Concerto for saxophone and orchestra at the Pilar Bardem auditorium of Rivas, performed by the Neotonarte Symphony Orchestra, conducted by Antonio Palmer and Joaquín Franco as a soloist.
- Once more Panegiricum Cupro was performed at the mining congress celebrated in Peñarroya-Pueblo Nuevo.
- Performance of The Odyssey overture at the National Auditorium of Music by the Juan Carlos King University Symphony Orchestra conducted by Angel del Palacio.
- Premiere of the work Two Christmas Motetes at the Federación Coral de Madrid closing concert of the XXI Choral Music Programme by the Juan Carlos King University Symphony Orchestra and Matritum Cantat and Comillas University choirs, conducted by Javier Blanco.
- Recording of 3th and 8th symphonies by the State Radio and Television Symphony Orchestra of Russia (Moscow).
- Performance of pieces from the cantata “Profil’ de viaj Spuroj” by the Arequipa Symphony Orchestra (Perú).
- Premiere of the two works Dies Irae and In Paradisum in the Pieterskerk in Utrecht. The second performance took place in the Achelse Kluis in Valkenswaard (Netherland). Both concerts were performed by the professional chamber choir Cantiere Vocale Utrecht conducted by Wilko Brouwers.
- Premiere of his Concerto for Piano and Orchestra in Madrid, Monumental Theatre with the Neotonarte Symphony Orchestra conducted by Antonio Palmer and Luis Fernando Pérez as soloist.
- Concert at the El Pardo Royal Chapel with his works The Odyssey (oberture) and Two Motetes or Christmas. King Juan Carlos University Symphony Orchestra and Matritum Cantat choir. Conductors Angel del Palacio and Javier Blanco.
- Broadcasting of his Concerto for Piano and Orchestra on Spanish Television, Conciertos de la 2.
- Concert at the Basílica de Atocha with his works: Ave María and Obertura and Interludio.

=== 2009 ===
- Screening of the Cosmological Suite in Córdoba and in Madrid at the program of Prem Rawat Foundation “Peace is possible”.
- Premiere of the last piece from the child Opera: Tierra de Todos, (Earth for everybody) National Auditorium, symphony hall, by the King Juan Carlos University Symphony Orchestra.
- Premiere of the work Añoranzas (Yearnings) for alto saxophone and piano, Ateneo of Madrid, performed by Jesús María Gómez and Joaquín Franco.
- Broadcasting of his Concerto for Piano and Orchestra on Spanish Television, Conciertos de la 2. (Repetition)

== List of works ==
Work	Instruments
Opera prima (Op. 1)	Piano
Three sonatas	Piano
Sonata for two pianos	Piano
Bells of the night	Piano
Zodiac Suite	Piano
The black cliff	Piano
Studio in E	Piano
Sonata for violín and piano	Piano and violin
Sonatina for violín and piano	Piano and violin
Sonata for piano and alto saxophone	Piano and saxophone
Work for piano and cello	Piano and violoncello
String quartet	Chamber
Saxophone Quartet	Chamber
Wind Quintet	Chamber
Two fantasies	Organ
Landscapes	Guitar
Landscapes	Guitar and flute version
Variations for harp and string quartet from a theme by Alonso de Mudarra	Harp and string quartet
Symphony chamber poem Panegiricum cupro	Brass, saxophones and percussion
12 choral works: Ave María; Wo leia sawola ni; Campos de Castilla; Looking for the paradise (spiritual); Jesus redemptor; Kaj la neĝo kovris la valoj; Esu; Salmo 103; Camino de Belén va una estrella (Christmas carol); Si me hallaras vacío; The night of the olive tree (4 similar voices); The Andromeda nebula	Choir a capella
Children's choir: The Garden; Bells of Madrid
Missa brevis: Kyrie; Gloria; Sanctus; Benedictus; Agnus Dei	Choir a capella
Lieder: Lied for soprano and piano	Vocal
Two songs: Azulejos de colores (Mezzo-soprano and piano); Canto del no morir: Aria for Bajo and piano	Vocal
El nia nio inta	Tenor and guitar/piano
Lux Æterna	Choir and brass ensemble
Sonata for strings	String orchestra
Dream	Classical orchestra
Symphony nº 1	Symphony orchestra
Symphony nº 2	Symphony orchestra
Symphony nº 3 "Philosophical"	Symphony orchestra
Symphony nº 4 "Cosmos"	Symphony orchestra and choir
Symphony nº 5 "Rebirth"	Symphony orchestra
Symphony nº 7 "Storm"	Symphony orchestra and choir
Symphony nº 8	Symphony orchestra
Symphony nº 9 "Genesis"	Symphony orchestra choir and soloists
Concerto for piano and orchestra	Symphony orchestra and soloist
Concerto for saxophone and orchestra	Symphony orchestra and soloist
Concerto for violín and orchestra	Symphony orchestra and soloist
Suite "Ages of Music"	Symphony orchestra
Symphony-Poem “The Odyssey”	Symphony orchestra, choir and a soloist
Symphony-Poem “Mercury”	Symphony orchestra
Dies irae	Symphony orchestra
In paradisum	Symphony orchestra and choir
La profil´de viaj spuroj Cantata	Choir, soloists and orchestra
Earth for everybody (Child Opera)	Symphony orchestra, soloists and Children's Choir
Two motetes for choir and orchestra: O Magnum Mysterium; Hodie Christus Natus Est	Choir and orchestra
Work for audio tape and three synthesizers	Electroacoustics
Esferas (Spheres)	String quartet and audio tape
Symphony nº 6	Electroacoustics
Two suites for electroacoustics: 1980S26, The Saturn's New Satellite; Cosmological Suite	Electroacoustics
Concerto for sound card	Electroacoustics
Several pieces for electronics	Electroacoustics
Variations for six child songs	Electroacoustics
Red planet	Electroacoustics
