= Luis Venegas de Henestrosa =

Spanish composer

Luis Venegas de Henestrosa (c. 1510 – 1570) was a Spanish composer of the 16th century active during the Spanish Golden Age. Few details are known about his life and he is most remembered for publishing Libro de cifra nueva para tecla, Arpa y Vihuela, a collection of over two hundred pieces for harp, keyboard and vihuela. The only two copies known to exist of this collection are kept at the Biblioteca Nacional de España in Madrid. The book contains a setting for organ of Conditor alme by Gracia Baptista, the earliest known keyboard work by a Spanish woman composer.
