= Journal of Music Theory Pedagogy =

The Journal of Music Theory Pedagogy is an annual peer-reviewed academic journal covering the teaching and pedagogy of music theory and analysis. It was established in 1987 and is published under the auspices of The Gail Boyd de Stwolinski Center for Music Theory Pedagogy at the University of Oklahoma.

The journal's founding editors-in-chief were James H. Faulconer, Alice M. Lanning, and Michael R. Rogers. Steven G. Laitz (Juilliard School) and Jennifer Snodgrass (Middle Tennessee State University) are the Executive Editors. David Thurmaier (University of Missouri-Kansas City) and Melissa Hoag (Oakland University) are the current Co-Editors.

In 2010, a year before the journal's 25th anniversary, the editors secured funding for a website, Music Theory Pedagogy Online. In 2013, the editors began publishing an online-only e-journal through the website, which provides resources for theory teachers. As of 2014, the e-journal has published over a dozen articles, including videos, apps, and other multimedia that cannot be included in the journal's main paper publication.
