= Pablo Bruna =

Spanish composer and organist

Pablo Bruna (22 June 1611 – 27 June 1679) was a Spanish composer and organist notable for his blindness (caused by a childhood bout of smallpox), which resulted in his being known as "El ciego de Daroca" ("the blind man of Daroca"). It is not known how Bruna received his musical training, but in 1631 he was appointed organist of the collegiate church of St. María in his hometown of Daroca, later rising to choirmaster in 1674. He remained there until his death in 1679.

Thirty-two of Bruna's organ works have survived, mostly in the tiento form. Many, known as tientos de medio registro, are for divided keyboard, a typical feature of Spanish organs. Bruna was known as a capable teacher and his nephew Diego Xaraba, whom he taught, also became a prominent musician.
