= Antonio de Cabezón =

Spanish composer and organist

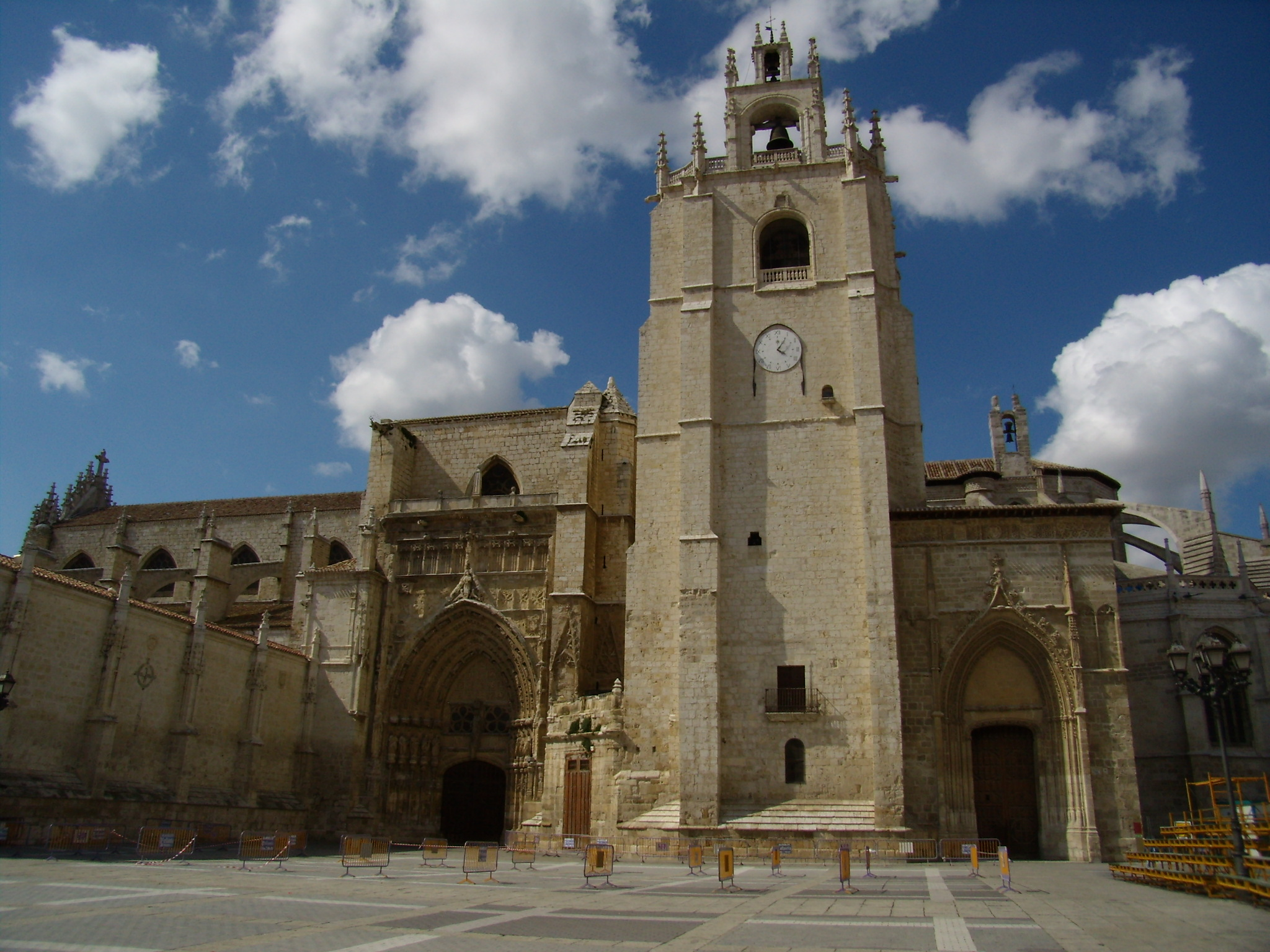
The Palencia Cathedral, where Cabezón probably received his music education from one García de Baeza

Antonio de Cabezón (30 March 1510 – 26 March 1566) was a Spanish Renaissance composer and organist. Blind from childhood, he quickly rose to prominence as a performer and was eventually employed by the royal family. He was among the most important composers of his time and the first major Iberian keyboard composer.

== Life ==
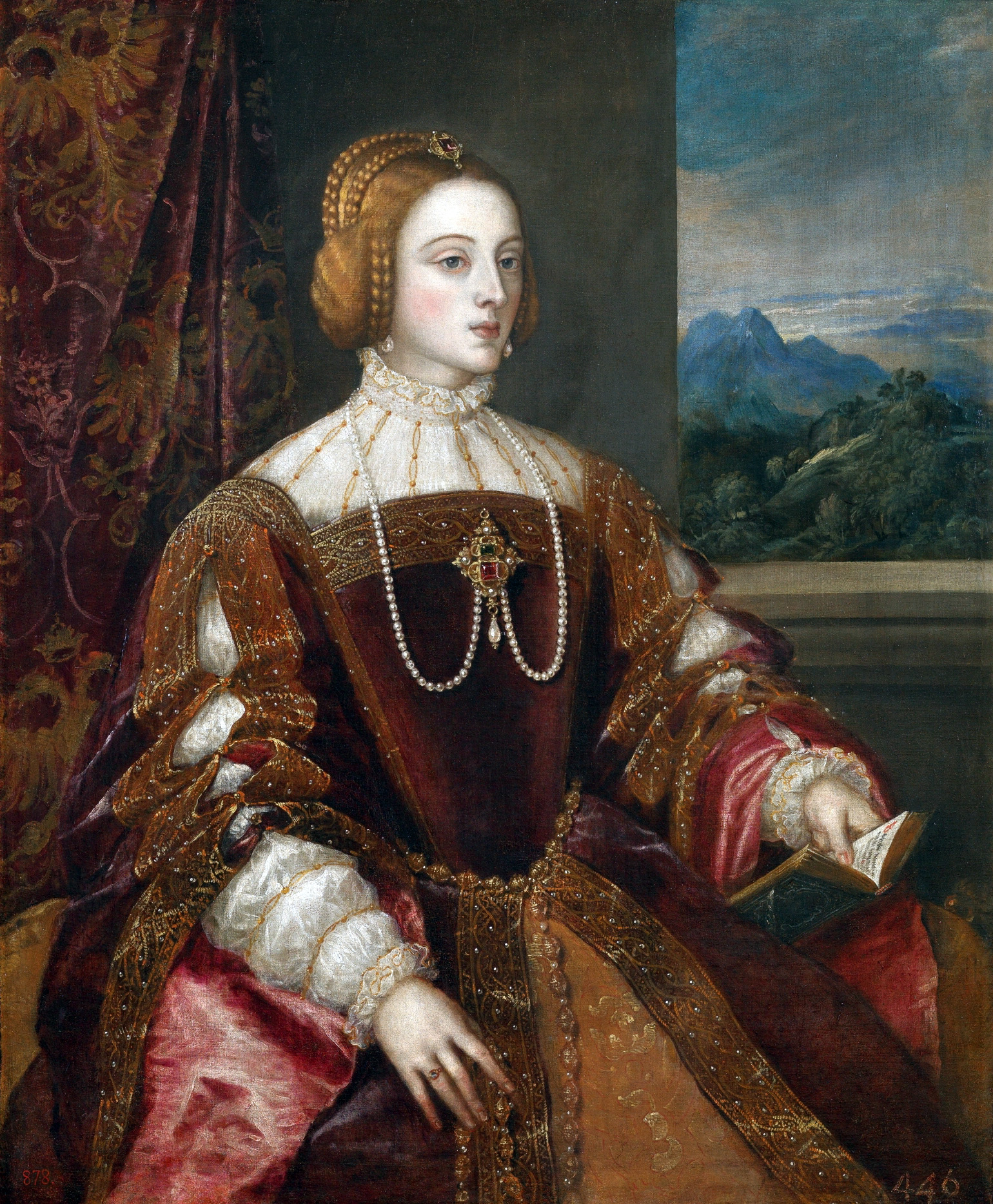
Isabella of Portugal, queen consort of Charles V, Cabezón's first patron. Portrait by Titian.

Cabezón was born in Castrillo Mota de Judíos, a municipality near Burgos, in the north of Spain. Nothing is known about his formative years. He became blind in early childhood, and he may have been educated at the Palencia Cathedral by the organist there, García de Baeza. At the time, the country was slowly entering its Golden Age. On 14 March 1516, Charles V was proclaimed King of Castile and of Aragon jointly with his mother, the first time the crowns of Castile and Aragon were united under the same king. After the death of his paternal grandfather, Maximilian, in 1519, Charles also inherited the Habsburg lands in Austria, and later went on to become Emperor of the Holy Roman Empire and one of the most powerful monarchs in the world.

In 1525, Charles married Isabella of Portugal, further strengthening his position in Spain. It was Isabella who employed Cabezón into her service in 1526. His duties included playing the clavichord and the organ, and he also assumed the position of organist at the chapel Isabella organized soon after her wedding. The composer remained with the royal family for the rest of his life. Through the court, he met such important composers as vihuelist Luis de Narváez, known today for his advanced polyphonic fantasias, and Tomás de Santa María, theorist and composer whose important treatise on instrumental music, Arte de tañer fantasía, was examined and approved by Cabezón.

In 1538, Cabezón was made músico de la cámara (chamber musician) to Charles (who as a child was educated in music by the noted organist Henry Bredemers). After Isabella's death in 1539, Cabezón was appointed music teacher to her children: Prince Felipe and his sisters Maria and Joan (Maria would later become the most important patron of composer Tomás Luis de Victoria). In 1543 Felipe became Regent of Spain, and he made Cabezón his court organist. Cabezón's duties included playing a portative organ for Felipe on his journeys. On 19 July 1546 Cabezón's brother Juan, also an organist and composer, was appointed musician in the royal chapel of Prince Felipe. Since the late 1540s Antonio and Juan both accompanied Felipe on his various trips, and visited Italy, the Netherlands, Germany (in 1548–49), and England (in 1554–56), where Antonio's variations may have influenced William Byrd and Thomas Tallis, who later took up the form.

Practically nothing is known about Cabezón's personal life. He married one Luisa Nuñez de Mocos from Ávila, and the couple had five children. One of Antonio's sons, Hernando de Cabezón (1541–1602) became a composer, and it was through his efforts that the bulk of Antonio's oeuvre was preserved. Another son, Agustín de Cabezón (who died before 1564), became a chorister of the royal chapel. Cabezón died in Madrid on 26 March 1566.

== Works ==
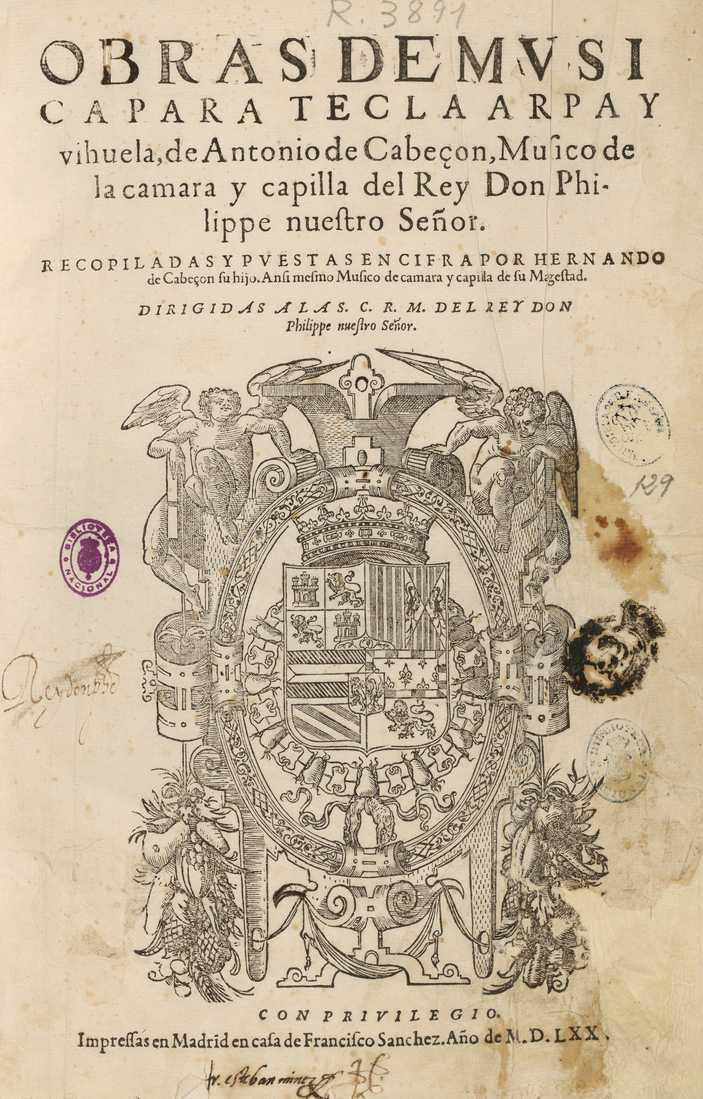
Title page of Obras de música

A few of Cabezón's works appeared in print during his lifetime in Luis Venegas de Henestrosa's compilation Libro de cifra nueva (Alcalá de Henares, 1557). However, the bulk of his compositions was published posthumously by his son Hernando in a volume titled Obras de música para tecla, arpa y vihuela (Madrid, 1578). Together these collections contain some 275 pieces, most for organ or other keyboard instruments. Cabezón also composed instrumental music for plucked string instruments and ensembles, and vocal music, but only a single vocal piece survives: Invocación a la letanía, in the Cancionero de la Casa de Medinaceli. A mention of a mass by Cabezón is contained in a 1611 inventory of music from Cuenca Cathedral, but the actual music is lost, as are, presumably, many other works by the composer. A good keyboard improviser, many works by Antonio de Cabezón transcribed by his son Hernando were "mere crumbs from my father's table".

=== Liturgical organ music ===
While French and Italian organists of the time frequently composed organ masses, in Spain this practice was limited to versos on the Kyrie. Consequently, most of Cabezón's liturgical music was intended for the Daily Offices—prescribed prayers of the daily round. Music for Mass is represented by the nine sets of Kyrie verses for organ. These fall into the following groups:

- Kyrie de Nuestra Señora, a three-voice setting, three parts (Kyrie, Christe, Kyrie) with the cunctipotens ("Mass IV") chant in the tenor.
- Tema Rex virginum, a four-voice setting, four parts (on the same chant: Kyrie, Kyrie, Christe, Kyrie rather than the expected even verses K-Chr-Chr-K)
- Kyries de primer, segundo, [...] septimo tono, seven four-voice settings, all in four parts (Kyrie, Christe, Christe, Kyrie); the original source places quinto tono last, possibly by mistake.

Cabezón's music for the Daily Offices comprises 32 hymns and three collections of versets for the psalms and for the Magnificats:

- Salmodia para principiantes (sets of four versillos on each of the 8 psalm tones "for beginners")
- Fabordon y glosas [del primer, segundo, [...] tono] (faburdens with 3 glosas or divisions in upper, bass and inner voices for each tone)
- Salmodia para el Magnificat (7 Magnificat verses for each tone)

=== Tientos ===
The tiento was a polyphonic form of instrumental music that originated in the Iberian peninsula, and has been linked to both tastar de corde (an improvisatory prelude) and the ricercar (an improvisatory prelude or, at a later stage of development, a strict imitative composition). Twenty-nine tientos by Cabezón survive. Fourteen appeared in Libro de cifra nueva: these works are all written out in long note values, alternating between imitative counterpoint and non-imitative sections. Usually there are three or four themes, and the first to be presented is also the most developed. The non-imitative parts frequently employ techniques unusual for the genre at the time: extended duets, motifs transforming into ostinato patterns. Twelve more tientos appear in Obras de música: six from an earlier period in Cabezón's career, and six late works. While the earlier pieces are similar in many respects to the Libro de cifra pieces, Cabezón's late tientos use smaller note values, have a tendency towards longer and more characteristic subjects, and many of their features anticipate the music of the Baroque period.

=== Variations ===
Nine sets of variations (in Spanish tradition called discantes, diferencias, or glosas) are included in Obras de musica:

1. Diferencias sobre las Vacas (3 variations)
2. Pavana italiana (6 variations)
3. Diferencias sobre la Gallarda milanese (2 variations)
4. Diferencias sobre el canto del Caballero (5 variations)
5. Diferencias sobre la Pavana italiana (5 variations)
6. Diferencias sobre el canto de La Dama le demanda (6 variations on Arbeau's Belle qui tiens ma vie)
7. Diferencias sobre el villancico De quién teme enojo Isabel (7 variations)
8. Diferencias sobre las Vacas (6 variations)
9. Otras diferencias de Vacas (4 variations)

Cabezón's variations are one of the earliest high points of the genre, and presumably influenced English composers such as Thomas Tallis and William Byrd. All of the variation sets begin with the first variation, assuming the theme is already known to the listener, and connect individual variations using free transitions, thus frequently making analysis of the structure complicated. Cabezón uses numerous techniques, such as a migrating and/or heavily ornamented cantus firmus. The models are taken from popular Spanish songs, dance forms, and established melodic-harmonic frameworks.

=== Intabulations ===
The intabulations in Obras de música are ordered according to polyphonic complexity, starting with the simpler four-part pieces and culminating with six-part ones. They are based on works by composers such as Josquin des Prez and Orlande de Lassus and are more or less similar to most such compositions of the period.

== Media ==
Canto del Caballero
performed on a harpsichord by Robert Schröter

Duuiensela
performed on a clavichord by Joan Benson
