= Sebastian Aguilera de Heredia =

Spanish monk, musician and composer

Sebastian Aguilera de Heredia (August 1561 – 16 December 1627) was a Spanish monk, musician and composer of the Renaissance period.

== Life ==
Aguilera was the first organist at the cathedral in Huesca from 1585 to 1603. During this time, he assisted in the construction of a new organ. In 1603, Aguilera moved to a more prestigious position as maestro de música at Cathedral of the Savior of Zaragoza in Zaragoza. He remained there until his death in 1627. He published a collection of works in 1618, and eighteen of his keyboard works survive. Aguilera is considered the first major figure of the Aragonese School of music centered on Zaragoza.

== Music and Influence ==
Aguilera composed both organ and vocal music. His work was written specifically for the church. While Aguilera's organ works do follow Spanish traditions, they also introduce new innovations. He created different types of tientos, including pieces that explored heavy dissonance, slow tempos, and unusual harmonies. He referred to this type of music as falsas. Aguilera's monothematic tientos use various contrapuntal and rhythmic techniques in order to develop a single theme. One of the most regarded techniques used in Aguilera's organ pieces is the medio registro technique. This highlights the left hand as a solo by giving it repeated, complex phrases while each half of the keyboard maintains its own registration. Aguilera also composed works based on Spanish hymn melodies, including contrapuntal and cantus firmus settings of well-known pieces. These settings used various asymmetrical and lively rhythmic patterns.

Aguilera gained recognition for his collection of 36 Magnificat settings titled Canticum Beatissimae Virginis deiparae Mariae. The collection includes four main groups: five, six, eight, and four voices. Each group has eight settings for each liturgical tone. The final four pieces of this collection are full double-choir settings.

== Organ music ==
- Pange lingua a 3 sobre bajo por Ce-sol-faut;
- Pange lingua a 3 sobre tiple;
- Salve de Lleno de 1.er tono;
- Salve de 1.er tono por De-la-sol-re;
- Primera obra de 1.er tono;
- Segunda obra del 1.er tono;
- Primer registro de bajo del 1.er tono;
- Segundo registro de bajo del 1.er tono;
- Tercer registro de bajo del 1.er tono;
- Primer tiento de falsas del 4º tono;
- Segundo tiento de falsas del 4º tono;
- Tiento grande del 4º tono;
- Falsas del 6º tono;
- Tiento del 8º tono por De-la-sol-re;
- Obra de 8º tono por Ge-sol-re-ut;
- Obra de 8º tono alto: Ensalada;
- Dos bajos de 8º tono;
- Discurso sobre los saeculorum;
- [?] Tiento de Batalla de 8º Tono.

== Vocal music ==
- Canticum Beatissimae Virginis Deiparae. Octo modis seu tonis compositium, quaternis vocibus, quinis, senis et octonis concinendum (Zaragoza, Tip. Pedro Cabarte, 1618).

== Discography ==
- Hora, Joaquim Simões da (1994), Órgãos Históricos Portugueses: Évora & Porto, Lusitana Musica, Volume I, EMI Classics / Valentim de Carvalho. CD 777 7 547 55 2 4.
- Uriol, Jose Luis González (1990), Antología de obras para órgano: Sebastián Aguilera de Heredia, Ministerio de Educación y Ciencia: Centro de Publicaciones, 1032 CD.

== Score editions ==
- Anglés, Higinio, (1965–68), Antología de Organistas Españoles del siglo XVII, Diputación Provincial de Barcelona: Biblioteca Central, Barcelona, 4 vols.
- Apel, Willi (1971), Spanish Organ Masters After Antonio de Cabezón, Corpus of Early Keyboard Music n.º 14, American Institute of Musicology.
- Doderer, Gerhard (1981), Tientos de medio registro: Organa Hispanica, Heft V, Heidelberg, Willy Muller, pp. 5–9.
- Gay, Claude (1979), L'Ouvre d'Orgue, Paris, Editions Alphonse Leduc & C.ª, 2 vols.
- Kastner, Macário Santiago (1965), Silva Ibérica, Volume 2, Mainz, Schott, pp. 34–39.
- Pedrell, Felipe (1908), Antologia de Organistas Clásicos Españoles, Madrid, Ildefonso Alier, Volumen Primero, p. V e pp. 64–76.
- Perez, José Sierra (2001), Música para Órgano: Siglo XVII: Fr. Cristóbal de San Jerónimo; P. Pedro de Tafalla; P. Diego de Torrijos, Escorial, Ediciones Escurialenses, pp. 157–163.
- Rubio, Samuel (1971), Antologia de Organistas Clásicos, Madrid, Union Musical Española. [Reedition of 1914's edition from Pe. Luis Villalba Muñoz].
- Siemens Hernández, Lothar (1978), Obras para Organo, Madrid, Editorial Alpuerto.

== Bibliography ==
- ANGLÉS, Higinio: Antología de organistas españoles del siglo XVII, Barcelona, 1965–68, 4 vols.
- APEL, Willi: Die spanische Orgelmusik vor Cabanilles, AnM, XVII, 1962.
- APEL, Willi, Spanish Organ Masters After Antonio de Cabezón, Corpus of Early Keyboard Music n.º 14, American Institute of Musicology, 1971.
- CABRAL, Luís (1982), “Catálogo do Fundo de Manuscritos Musicais”, Biblioteca Portucalensis, 2ª Série, n.º 1, Porto, Biblioteca Pública Municipal.
- CALAHORRA MARTÍNEZ, Pedro: La música en Zaragoza en los siglos XVI y XVII, IFC, 1977-78.
- CASARES, E., Francisco Asenjo Barbieri: Biografías y documentos sobre música y músicos españoles, Legado Barbieri, i (Madrid, 1986), 4–5.
- DODERER, Gerhard Tientos de medio registro, Organa Hispanica, Heft V, 1981, Heidelberg, Willy Muller, pp. 5–9.
- DURÁN GUDIOL, Antonio: Órganos, organeros y organistas de la catedral de Huesca, Argensola, X, Huesca, 1959.
- GAY, Claude, L'Ouvre d'Orgue, Paris, Editions Alphonse Leduc & C.ª, 2 vols, 1979.
- HUDSON, Barton, A Portuguese Source of Seventeenth-Century Iberian Organ Music, Doutoramento, 1961, Indiana, Universidade do Indiana, Policopiado.
- KASTNER, Macário Santiago "Três libros desconocidos com música orgânica en las Bibliotecas de Oporto y Braga", Anuário Musical, vol. I, 1946, Barcelona, pp. 143–151.
- KASTNER, Macario Santiago: Contribución al estudio de la musica española y portuguesa, Lisboa, 1941.
- KASTNER, Macário Santiago, Silva Ibérica, Volume 2, Edition Schott Music, 1965, pp. 34–39.
- KASTNER, Macario Santiago: "Ursprung und Sinn des 'Medio registro'" AnM, XIX, 1964.
- PALACIOS, José Ignacio, Los compositores aragoneses, Zaragoza, CAI, 2000. ISBN 84-95306-41-7.
- PEDRELL, Felipe Antologia de Organistas Clásicos Españoles, 1908, Madrid, Ildefonso Alier, Volumen Primero, p. V e pp. 64–76.
- ROUBINET, M., «Sebastián Aguilera de Heredia», en: Gilles Cantagrel (dir.), Guide de la musique d’orgue, Éditions Fayard, 1991, ISBN 2-213-02772-2.
- RUBIO, Samuel Antologia de Organistas Clásicos, Madrid, Union Musical Española, 1971.
- SIEMENS HERNÁNDEZ, Lothar: La Seo de Zaragoza, destacada escuela de órgano en el siglo XVII. I: Sebastián Aguilera y José Ximénez. AnM 21, (1966), 1968, pp. 147–167.
- SIEMENS HERNÁNDEZ, Lothar, Obras para Organo, Editorial Alpuerto, Madrid, 1978.
- Voz «Sebastián Aguilera de Heredia», Gran Enciclopedia Aragonesa.
