= Rafael Alers =

Puerto Rican musician, composer, bandleader

- Born: October 16, 1903 Aguadilla, Puerto Rico
- Died: March 20, 1978 (aged 74) San Juan, Puerto Rico
- Genres: Danzas
- Occupation(s): Musician, composer and bandleader
- Instrument(s): Euphonium, trombone and tuba

Rafael Alers (October 16, 1903 – March 20, 1978) was a musician, composer, bandleader and the first Puerto Rican to compose the music score for a Hollywood feature film.

== Early years ==
Rafael Alers Gerena) was born in the city of Aguadilla, Puerto Rico, to Don Ignacio Alers and Doña Anita Gerena. He received his primary and secondary education in his hometown. The love that he developed for the Puerto Rican Danzas came about at a young age because of the influence which he received from his musically inclined family. He received his first musical instructions from the maestro Juan F. Acosta. With Acosta he learned to play the euphonium, a wind instrument which is essential in the execution of the danza. He also learned to play the trombone and tuba.

== Musical career ==
External audio
- You may listen to Luciano Quiñones piano interpretation of Alers "Violeta" here
- and to Rafael Alers and his Orchestra play "Recuerdos De Borinquen" on YouTube

Upon finishing his musical instruction, Alers went to play for various national and international bands and Symphony Orchestras. Eventually, he formed his own band and recorded the Puerto Rican danzas composed by Juan Morel Campos, Manuel Gregorio Tavárez and Ángel Mislan.

In 1933, Alers was the conductor of Carmelo Díaz Soler's Orchestra, which had a daily segment in a radio program. Alers took charge of the orchestra upon the death of Díaz Soler and in 1935 he felt the inspiration to compose a danza. He composed what was to become his greatest danza and named it "Violeta" and the following day he played it on the radio.

The public's acceptance and demand for the danza was so great that the radio station started a "Write the Lyrics to the Danza" contest. They were looking for the right lyrics to go with the musical melody of the danza. The lyrics written by Antonio Cruz Nieves, from the town of Cataño, was selected as the winner. Alers married Catalina Roldán and had four sons (the eldest now deceased) and three daughters. "Violeta", which was the title of his danza, was officially dedicated to his youngest daughter.

== 8 Danzones from Puerto Rico ==
One of the recordings by Rafael Alers was: 8 Danzones from Puerto Rico.

- "Conversación", 3:12
- "Delia y Belén", 3:03
- "El Torbellino", 3:08
- "Estrella de Borinquen", 3:16
- "La Borinqueña", 2:27
- "No me toques", 3:17
- "Recuerdos", 3:15
- "Sara", 2:38

== Later years ==
Alers was named conductor of the ROTC band of the University of Puerto Rico, which in 1946 included a young man by the name of Julito Rodríguez, who was to become a professional musician himself. Alers became the first Puerto Rican to compose the music score for a Hollywood movie when he was hired for such a task for the 1956 movie "Crowded Paradise", directed by Fred Pressburger. Many of his recordings were released in 1960, in a set of three volumes, titled "Rafael Alers: Danzas". Rafael Alers died on March 20, 1978, in San Juan, Puerto Rico.

His compositions have been recorded by many artists, including the singer Julita Ross. In 2003, a collection of Rafael's recordings was released under the title: "Rafael Alers y su Orchestra, Danzas Vol.1".

== See also ==
- List of Puerto Ricans
- French immigration to Puerto Rico
