= List of people from San Juan, Puerto Rico =

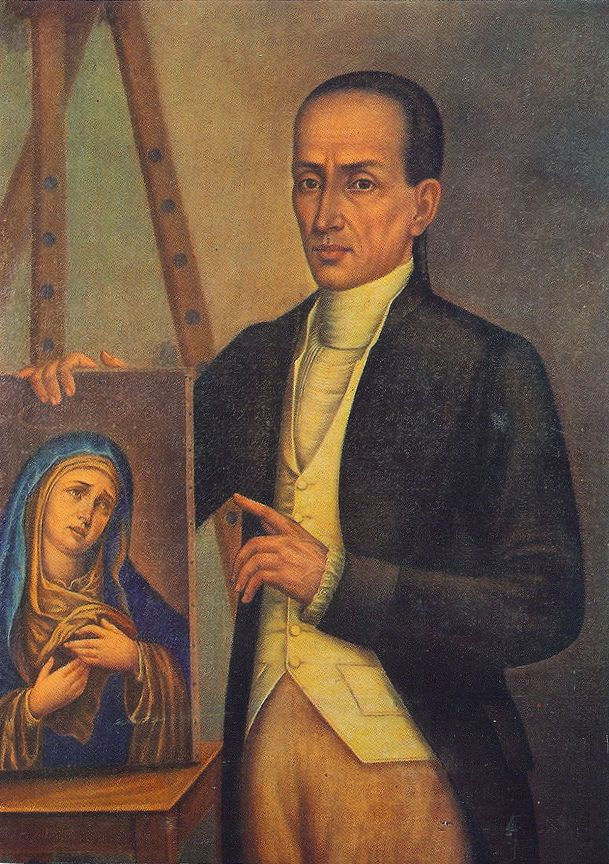
José Campeche

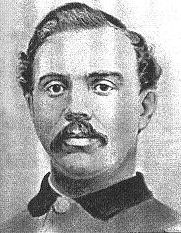
Augusto Rodríguez

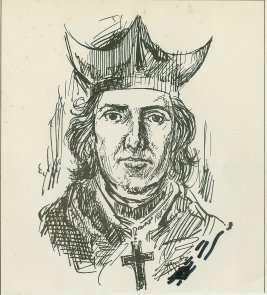
Juan Alejo de Arizmendi

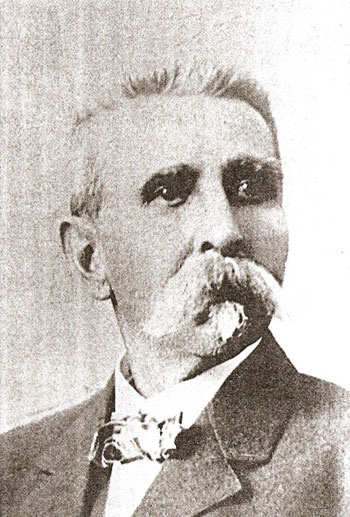
Fermín Tangüis

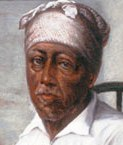
Rafael Cordero

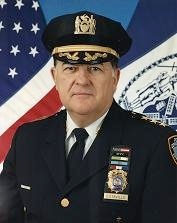
Nicholas Estavillo

This is a list of notable people who were either born in San Juan, Puerto Rico or who were not born in San Juan, but who are or were longtime residents of the city. San Juan has been the birthplace and the place of residence of many Puerto Ricans and people who are not of Puerto Rican heritage who became notable artists, military personnel, politicians, scientists and sportsmen; locally referred to as "Sanjuaneros". The following lists some of them and details their occupation:

== List by profession ==
Name	Profession
Héctor Luis Acevedo	Former Mayor of San Juan and Secretary of State of Puerto Rico
José Miguel Agrelot	Actor and comedian, known as "Don Cholito"
Ricardo E. Alegría	Anthropologist and archaeologist, known as the "father of modern Puerto Rican archaeology"
Manuel A. Alonso	Writer and poet
Juan de Amezquita	Member of the Puerto Rican militia who defended Puerto Rico from an invasion by Dutch Captain Balduino Enrico (Boudewijn Hendricksz) in 1625
Ricardo Aponte	United States Air Force General; the first Hispanic Director, J-7, of the United States Southern Command, located in Miami, Florida
Félix Arenas Gaspar	Puerto Rican Captain in the Spanish Army who was posthumously awarded the Cruz Laureada de San Fernando, the highest military decoration awarded by the Spanish government, for his actions in the Rif War
Juan Alejo de Arizmendi	First Puerto Rican to be named Bishop by the Catholic Church
Raymond Ayala	Reggaeton singer
María de las Mercedes Barbudo (1773–1849)	First "Independentista", the first Puerto Rican woman to become an advocate of Puerto Rican independence
Carlos Romero Barceló	Former governor of Puerto Rico, Resident Commissioner, senator and mayor of San Juan
Eddie Benitez	Musician
Tomás Blanco	Writer and historian
Kristina Brandi	Professional tennis player
Giannina Braschi	Poet, novelist, dramatist
Sila María Calderón	Former governor of Puerto Rico, Secretary of State and mayor of San Juan; the first female governor of Puerto Rico
José Campeche	Puerto Rican visual artist
Deborah Carthy-Deu	Miss Universe 1985
Nitza Margarita Cintron	Chief of Space Medicine and Health Care Systems for NASA
Celestina Cordero	Educator, in 1820 founded the first school for girls in San Juan
Rafael Cordero	Educator, known as "the father of public education in Puerto Rico"
Christian Daniel	Singer-songwriter and actor
Pedro del Valle	First Hispanic General in the Marine Corps; played an instrumental role in the capture of Okinawa in World War II
Stephanie Del Valle	Model, Miss World 2016
Alberto Díaz, Jr.	Rear Admiral, first Hispanic Director of the San Diego Naval District and Balboa Naval Hospital
Guillermo Diaz	Professional basketball player
Justino Díaz	Operatic bass-baritone singer; in 1963, was the first Puerto Rican to win an annual contest held at the Metropolitan Opera of New York
Carmen Lozano Dumler	One of the first Puerto Rican women to become a United States Army officer
Nicholas Estavillo	First Puerto Rican and the first Hispanic in the history of the NYPD to reach the three-star rank of Chief of Patrol
Cano Estremera	Salsa singer
Salvador E. Felices	First Puerto Rican to reach the rank of Major General (2-star) in the United States Air Force
Gigi Fernández	Professional tennis player; first Puerto Rican woman to win an Olympic gold medal (representing the U.S.) and the first to be inducted into the International Tennis Hall of Fame
Enrique Figueroa	Olympic sailor; the only sailor of Puerto Rico to win four gold medals in the Central American-Caribbean Games
Manuel Goded Llopis	High-ranking Puerto Rican in the Spanish Army; joined Spanish General Francisco Franco in the revolt against the Spanish Republican government (also known as Spanish loyalists) in the Spanish Civil War
Wilfredo Gómez	Former boxer and three-time world champion
Isabel González	Activist who paved the way for Puerto Ricans to be given United States citizenship
Diego E. Hernández	First Hispanic to be named Vice Commander of North American Aerospace Defense Command (NORAD)
Raul Julia	Actor
Javier López	Major League Baseball pitcher
Javy López	Former Major League Baseball catcher
Olin Pierre Louis	Haitian priest at the Iglesia San Mateo de Cangrejos
Mike Lowell	Major League Baseball player
Luis Muñoz Marín	First Puerto Rican elected governor
Ricky Martin	Singer and actor
Tony Martinez	Actor, singer, and bandleader
Kenneth McClintock	13th President of the Senate of Puerto Rico; 22nd Secretary of State; former senator and City Councilman
Andy Montañez	Salsa singer
José Trías Monge	Former Chief Justice, Attorney General of Puerto Rico and member of Puerto Rico's Constitutional Convention
Ossie Ocasio	Boxer and former world Cruiserweight champion
Carlos Obed Baerga Ortiz	Major League Baseball player
Luis Padial	Brigadier General in the Spanish Army; politician; important figure in the abolishment of slavery in Puerto Rico
Dr. Hernán Padilla	Physician; former Mayor of San Juan; Puerto Rico House Majority Leader
José Enrique Pedreira	Musician and composer
Joaquin Phoenix	Actor who earned a nomination for the Academy Award for Best Supporting Actor for Gladiator and received wider recognition for his portrayal of musician Johnny Cash in Walk the Line
Carlos Ponce	Major League Baseball player
José M. Portela	Retired officer of the United States Air Force; in 1972 became the youngest C-141 Starlifter aircraft commander
Jorge Posada	New York Yankees catcher
Ramón Power y Giralt	Among the first native-born Puerto Ricans to refer to himself as a "Puerto Rican" and to fight for the equal representation of Puerto Rico in front of the parliamentary government of Spain
Samuel R. Quiñones	Lawyer and 5th President of the Puerto Rican Senate
Carlos D. Ramirez (1946–1999)	Publisher of El Diario La Prensa
Marion Frederic Ramírez de Arellano	Captain; first Hispanic submarine commanding officer in the United States Navy
Reyna Avila Ramírez-Arellano	Praetor, Roman demigod, character in the book series The Heroes of Olympus
Felisa Rincón de Gautier	Former Mayor of San Juan; Democratic National Committeewoman; first woman to be elected mayor of a capital city in the Americas
Pablo Hernández Rivera	21st Resident Commissioner of Puerto Rico
Augusto Rodríguez	Lieutenant in the United States Union Army; member of the 15th Connecticut Regiment (aka Lyon Regiment); during the American Civil War he served in the defenses of Washington, D.C.; led his men in the Battles of Fredericksburg and Wyse Fork
Augusto Rodríguez	Founder of Choir of the University of Puerto Rico
Johanna Rosaly	Actress and television host
Dr. Pedro Rosselló	Former governor, senator and San Juan Municipal Health Director
Francisco Rovira Rullán	Art dealer
Sa-Fire	Freestyle artist
Jorge Santini	Former Mayor of San Juan and senator
Daniel Santos	Boxer
Antulio Segarra	Officer in the United States Army; in 1943 became the first Puerto Rican to command a Regular Army Regiment
Geovany Soto	Current Chicago Cubs catcher, 2008 National League Rookie of the Year
Cristina Takacs-Vesbach	Antarctic researcher, microbial ecologist
Fermín Tangüis	Developed the seed that would eventually produce the Tanguis cotton in Peru, which saved that nation's cotton industry
Dayanara Torres	1993 Miss Universe pageant winner
Pedro Vázquez	Former Puerto Rico Secretary of State
Samuel E Vázquez	Visual artist
Aníbal Acevedo Vilá	Former Governor and Resident Commissioner of Puerto Rico
Roberto Sánchez Vilella	Former governor, first Secretary of State, Secretary of Public Works and San Juan City Administrator

Due to space limitations it is almost impossible to list all of the people of San Juan who have distinguished themselves; therefore, a category has been created to this effect:
