= Mercedes Arias =

Puerto Rican musician and composer

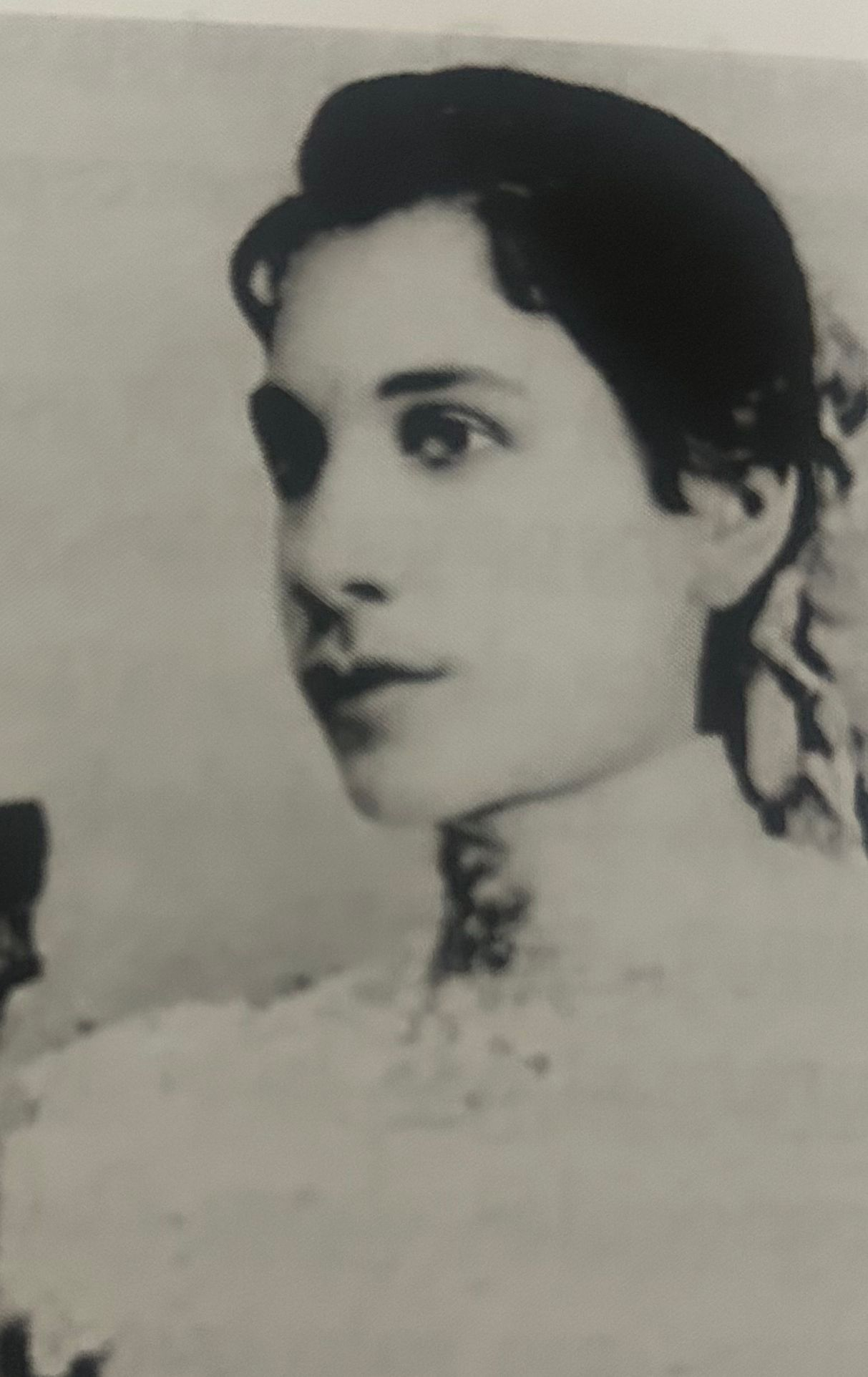
- Mercedes Arias, c. 1880

Background information
- Birth name: Mercedes Arias Ventura
- Born: 1862
- Origin: Ponce, Puerto Rico
- Died: 7 January 1954 (aged 91–92) Ponce, Puerto Rico
- Genres: Danza
- Occupation(s): Composer, musician, music teacher
- Instrument: Piano
- Years active: ca. 1880 – ca.1920

Mercedes Arias Ventura (1862 – 7 January 1954) was a Puerto Rican musician and composer from Ponce, Puerto Rico. Among her compositions are "Renacimiento" (Renaissance), and "Flores y Perlas" (Flowers and Pearls).

== Professional career ==
Arias was trained by Juan Morel Campos and Julio Arteaga. She was "one of the greatest pianists and composers Ponce had". Her compositors are "saturated with beauty." Among them are "Renacimiento" (Renaissance), and "Flores y Perlas" (Flowers and Pearls). She was one of the first musician contracted by Jaime Pericas Díaz in his concert hall orchestra in 1926. She was also highly applauded and regarded in her solo concerts. Under the leadership of Juan Morel Campos, Lizzie Graham and Arias, many representations, concerts, discussions and recitals occurred in Ponce. She also worked at Teatro Delicias interpreting the piano sound synchronization that accompanied the soundless films of the time. During the 1880s, Julio Arteaga, Juan Ríos Ovalle and Mercedes Arias would often perform together at popular events.

== Personal life ==
Arias was a student of Juan Morel Campos. Many people who know about Arias, get their knowledge through stories about Juan Morel Campos, as it is said that Mercedes Arias was Morel Campos's secret love. The story goes that the two saw each other romantically in the evenings in what is now Callejón Amor/Paseo Arias. (Note: The Ponce Municipal Government named the street "Paseo Arias" after unrelated Antonio Arias Ventura, general manager of the Banco Crédito y Ahorro Ponceño.) However, due to race issues, her family did not approve of the relationship and they were never married. There was a lot of gossip in the streets of Ponce regarding the platonic love between Morel Campos and Arias.

== Music teacher ==
Among her disciples was the father of Héctor Campos Parsi who, together with his wife, were decisive in influencing the future musical career of little Héctor. Arias would also volunteer for local public school activities related to music classes. For example, in 1904 she funded herself to travel to New York City with a group of public school educators from Ponce in support of two music teachers in that group. In 1892, Arias organized a concert to showcase the advancement her students had made. Among her disciples were Elisa Tavárez, Amelia Serra, Lila Salazar, Leonor Valdivieso, Celina Besosa, María Rodríguez, Panchita Colón, and María Laguna and Mercedes Laguna.

== Death ==
It has been said that in her deathbed, Arias asked to be buried with copies of the musical compositions that Morel Campos had dedicated to her. She was buried at the Cementerio Católico San Vicente de Paul.

== Legacy ==
- *Mercedes Arias is commemorated at the Ponce Park of the Illustrious Ponce Citizens.

== See also ==
- List of Puerto Ricans
- List of Puerto Rican songwriters
- List of people from Ponce, Puerto Rico
