= José Ignacio Quintón =

Puerto Rican pianist and composer (1881–1925)

- Quintón in 1911
- Born: February 1, 1881; Caguas, Puerto Rico
- Died: December 19, 1925 (aged 44); Coamo, Puerto Rico
- Occupations: Composer; pianist

José Ignacio Quintón (February 1, 1881 – December 19, 1925) was a Puerto Rican pianist and composer of danzas.

== Early years ==
Quintón was born in Caguas, Puerto Rico, into a musically talented family. His father, a Frenchman by the name of Juan Bautista Quintón y Luzón, was a graduate of the Conservatory of Music of Paris. The elder Quintón was also a composer and organist who became his son's first music teacher. When Quintón was two years old his family moved to the town of Coamo. In Coamo, he took piano lessons with Ernesto del Castillo. In 1890, when he was nine years old, he performed his first concert. When he was only eleven years old he accompanied the famed Cuban violinist Claudio Brindis de Salas Garrido on the piano in a concert and was highly acclaimed by him. Quintón continued to study music and was the director of his school's band. During his spare time he gave piano and violin lessons.

By 1917, Quintón had taught himself to read English. This enabled him to read and study English language music books and magazines of the time thus becoming informed of the styles and compositions of Debussy, Ravel and other composers.

== Danzas ==
External audio
- You may listen to Luciano Quiñones piano interpretation of Mi Estrella here
- and El Coquí here

The first danzas that Quintón composed were Confía (Trust), Mi estrella (My Star) and Amor imposible (Impossible Love). He received many awards and the recognition of his fellow musicians for the compositions Cuarteto para instrumentos de cuerdas (Quartet for string instruments), Variaciones sobre un tema de Hummel (Variations on a theme of Hummel) and many others. He also wrote Misa de Requiem as a tribute to the late composer of danzas Ángel Mislan.

His greatest composition was the danza El Coquí. In this danza he was able to simulate the sound of the coquí, a tiny frog with a unique call found in Puerto Rico.

== Legacy ==
José Ignacio Quintón died on December 19, 1925, in the town of Coamo where he is buried. The town of Coamo has honored his memory by naming one of its principal avenues after him and by conserving the house in which he lived as a historical landmark. The José I. Quintón Academy of Music is located in Coamo. The Centro Musical Criollo José Ignacio Quintón, a museum is located in Caguas.

== See also ==
- List of Puerto Ricans
