= Julita Ross =

Puerto Rican singer

- Also known as: "The Great Lady of the Danzas"
- Born: March 21, 1919; Arecibo, Puerto Rico
- Died: June 29, 1981; Toa Baja, Puerto Rico
- Genres: Danzas
- Occupation: Singer of Puerto Rican danzas

Julita Ross (March 21, 1919 – June 29, 1981) was a singer of Puerto Rican danzas, also known as "The Great Lady of the Danzas".

== Early years ==
Ross was born in Arecibo, Puerto Rico. Her parents Ramon and Clemencia moved to the Santurce section of San Juan in 1923. Ross received her primary and secondary education and graduated from the Central High School of Santurce. In 1940, she joined an artistic singing group which had a show called "Industrias Nativas" (Native Industries) and which was transmitted through the radio station "WIAC", until 1945.

During World War II, Ross entertained the troops with her voice in "USO shows" (United Service Organizations). After touring with the USO, Ross went to New York City where she performed in many hispanic theaters, among which was "El Teatro Puerto Rico". She was also heard on the radio stations "WWRL" and "WHOM".

== Singing career ==
External audio
- You may listen to Julita Ross' "No me escribas" on YouTube

In 1947, Ross was offered a recording contract. She recorded the boleros "Diez Años" (Ten Years) by Rafael Hernández and "Aunque Me Llores" (Even if you cry for me) by Claudio Ferrer. In 1948, she recorded 49 danzas written by composers such as Juan Morel Campos, Manuel Gregorio Tavárez, Rafael Alers and Ángel Mislan among others.

In 1953, Ross returned to Puerto Rico where she received a contract from the radio station "WNEL" to do the show "La Voz de Borinquen" (The voice of Puerto Rico). This is where she was nicknamed "The Great Lady of the Danzas".

Ross's first record was titled "Julita Ross Canta Danzas" (Julita Ross Sings Danzas). In 1961, she recorded "Julita y Chago" and in 1968 "La Siempre Recordada Julita Ross" (The Always Remembered Julita Ross). She also recorded "La Borinqueña", "No me escribas", "La dama de la canción" and "Canciones de ayer".

== Later years ==
Ross moved to Levittown, Toa Baja in 1966. She continued to participate in many activities, especially with the Institute of Puerto Rican Culture. In 1974, Ross was honored by the Cayetano Coll y Toste Club in Arecibo. She was given the "keys" to the city and inducted into the Arecibo Hall of Fame.

Julita Ross died on June 29, 1981, in Levittown, Toa Baja and was buried in Bayamón. The mayor of Toa Baja honored her memory by renaming the Levittown theater "El Theatro de Bellas Artes de Julita Ross" (The Julita Ross Theater of Beautiful Arts).

== See also ==
- List of Puerto Ricans
- German immigration to Puerto Rico
- History of women in Puerto Rico
