= Juan F. Acosta =

Puerto Rican composer

- Born: May 27, 1890 San Sebastián, Puerto Rico
- Died: 1968 (aged 77–78) Quebradillas, Puerto Rico
- Genres: Danzas
- Occupation(s): Composer and music teacher.

Juan F. Acosta (May 27, 1890 – 1968) was a Puerto Rican composer and music teacher.

== Early years ==
Acosta, who came from a large family, was born and educated in the town of San Sebastián, Puerto Rico, located in the western part of the main island. His parents, realizing that their son was gifted with musical talent, enrolled him at a young age to take music classes. He was under the tutorship of Jesús Fiqueroa (1878–1971), an accomplished composer himself, who taught him how to play various musical instruments, among them the clarinet and the euphonium. By 1900, when Acosta was only 10 years old, he was able to prepare the musical arrangements for the orchestras directed by Fiqueroa. In 1906, when he was 16 years old, Acosta was approached by Ángel Mislán (1862–1911), the director of the San Sebastián Municipal Band, who took him under his wing. Mislán taught Acosta the art of musical composition and harmony. Every town had a band which played in the town's square. The position of band director was considered a very important one, and when Mislán left San Sebastián, he recommended that Acosta be his successor.

== First composition ==
External audio
- You may listen to Luciano Quiñones piano interpretation of Acosta's "Bajo la sombra de un Pino" here

Acosta had a girlfriend called Carmela, who in turn had another friend by the same name. Before moving from San Sebastián, in 1909, at the age of 19, he wrote his first danza titled Las Carmelas, inspired by the girls. He moved to the town of Adjuntas, where he organized its municipal band and various school bands. It is also where he met his future wife, Ramona "Ramonita" Nieves.

Acosta's artistic talent was soon solicited in other parts of Puerto Rico, and he found himself working and visiting other towns. One of his students was a young man by the name of Rafael Alers Gerena, who in the future would also become a distinguished musician himself. Acosta visited over 37 towns, where he instructed teachers in music and helped develop the educational music system of their schools.

On July 7, 1936, Acosta was resting under a pine tree in the plaza of the town of Hatillo, which inspired him to write one of his greatest compositions, the danza Bajo la sombra de un pino (Under the Shade of a Pine). Among Acosta's many compositions are Así es la vida (That's Life) and "Glorias del pasado" (Glories of the Past). Acosta wrote over 844 musical pieces, including 127 hymns.

== Later years ==
Juan F. Acosta died in 1968 and is buried in Quebradillas. According to his wishes, his family planted a pine tree by his grave. Over 300 of Acosta's musical compositions are safeguarded in the Institute of Puerto Rican Culture. In the 1960s, the Institute made a recording of 12 of Acosta's greatest compositions, interpreted on piano by Elsa Rivera Salgado (1908–1998).

== See also ==
- List of Puerto Ricans
