= Julio C. Arteaga =

Puerto Rico musician and composer

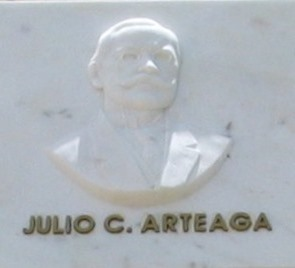
- Julio C. Arteaga, ca. 1919

Background information
- Birth name: Julio Carlos de Arteaga Matheu
- Born: 29 October 1867
- Origin: Ponce, Puerto Rico
- Died: 1923; New York, New York
- Genres: Danza
- Occupation(s): Composer, musician, music teacher
- Instrument: Piano
- Years active: ca. 1885–1915

Julio C. Arteaga (29 October 1867 – 1923) was a Puerto Rican musician and composer of danzas.

== Early years ==
Julio Carlos de Arteaga Matheu (a.k.a., Julio Carlos Arteaga Matheu) was born in Ponce, Puerto Rico, on 29 October 1867 to Diego Arteaga Lopez, from Venezuela, and Isabel Matheu. He had two siblings, Juan Jose and Herminia Isabel.

== Professional career ==
A composer and musician from Puerto Rico, Arteaga's musical performances were not limited to Puerto Rico, and he traveled to New York City often performing there as well. Among his many musical awards, at a music competition in Paris he won First Prize in Piano Performance in 1890.

== Music school ==
After teaching music theory and music lessons out of his home for a while, in 1898 he co-founded the Asociación Musical de Puerto Rico (Puerto Rico Music Association). In that same year he and Felipe Gutiérrez Espinosa, another outstanding Puerto Rican composer, approached Governor Guy V. Henry with a proposal to establish a music institute in San Juan. While the project never materialized due to lack of interest in Governor Henry's administration, it gave birth to the idea of establishing music schools independent of the public instruction system.

Together with his wife, Nicolasa Torruellas, he founded the Arteaga Academy in Ponce, where they taught piano, music theory, organ, and voice, among others. Among his pupils was Monserrate Ferrer Otero ("Monsita Ferrer"), and Mercedes Arias. This last one, Mercedes Arias, was the failed love of Juan Morel Campos, the woman he loved but could never marry, and on whom Morel Campos found inspiration for several of his great masterpiece danzas, including "Maldito Amor" (Damned Love), "No Me Toques" (Don't Touch Me) and "Alma Sublime" (Sublime Soul). He returned to New York City where he had studied violin and works as organist at St. Patrick's Cathedral from 1920 to 1923. He died in New York City in 1923.

== Family life ==
Arteaga married Daría Nicolasa Torruellas, also a musician, with whom he had five children, four boys (including Pedro [1903–], and Julio Carlos [1907–]), and a girl. The girl, Genoveva, would become an outstanding musician herself.

== Legacy ==
- There is a relief sculpture on the right front wall face of the Concha Acustica de Ponce engraved with his face and shoulders as well as his name. His is the center sculpture: to his left is Antonio Paoli and to the right is Juan Ríos Ovalle.
- A music school in New York City has his name.
- There are two streets named after him. One in Urbanizacion Perla del Sur, in Ponce, and the other in Urbanización Villa Prades in San Juan.

== See also ==
- List of Puerto Ricans
- List of Puerto Rican songwriters
- List of people from Ponce, Puerto Rico
