= Augusto Rodríguez =

Augusto Rodríguez may refer to:

- Augusto Rodríguez (soldier) (1835–1880), Puerto Rican soldier who fought in the American Civil War
- Augusto Rodríguez (musician) (1904–1993), Puerto Rican musician who founded the "Coro de la Universidad de Puerto Rico" (The Choir of the University of Puerto Rico)
