= Ángel Mislan =

Puerto Rican composer

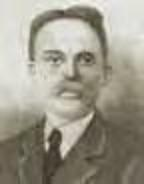

Background information
- Born: March 1, 1862
- Origin: San Sebastián, Puerto Rico
- Died: February 1, 1911 (aged 48) Barceloneta, Puerto Rico
- Genres: danza
- Occupations: composer, director of the San Sebastián Municipal Band

Ángel Mislan (March 1, 1862 – February 1, 1911) was a composer of Puerto Rican Danzas.

== Early years ==
Mislan (birth name: Ángel Mislan Huertas) was born in San Sebastián, Puerto Rico where he was raised and educated. The small town is located in the western part of Puerto Rico. His father was a music teacher who gave private lessons on the use of musical instruments. Mislan learned from his father how to play the clarinet and the euphonium (the latter is essential in the performance of Puerto Rican danzas). When he was very young he went to Spain to further his musical training by learning composition and harmony.

== Musical career ==
External audio
- You may listen to Luciano Quiñones piano interpretation of Ángel Mislan's "Sara" here
- and of "Tú y Yo" here.

In 1886, when Mislan was 24 years old, he returned to Puerto Rico and settled down in Arecibo. There he joined the Military Band of the Third Battalion of Volunteers; eventually, he became the director of that band. During this period he wrote his two best known danza compositions, "Sara" and "Tu y Yo" (You and I). His style differed from that of Manuel Gregorio Tavárez and Juan Morel Campos in that his danzas were typically shorter and humorous.

In 1898, Mislan returned to his hometown where he became the director of the Municipal Band. This was an important position, held in high regard by the society of the time. In 1906, he met a young musician by the name of Juan F. Acosta and took him under his wing. The older performer taught Acosta music composition and harmony and, when Mislan moved from San Sebastian to the town of Barceloneta, he recommended that Acosta replace him as the new director of the San Sebastian Municipal Band.

== Legacy ==
Mislan died in the town of Barceloneta, Puerto Rico on February 1, 1911. Besides writing danzas, Mislan also wrote Puerto Rican folk music, waltzes and marches. Most of his works are safeguarded in the Instituto de Cultura Puertorriqueña (Institute of Puerto Rican Culture). In 1948, Puerto Rican singer Julita Ross recorded the danzas of Ángel Mislan. The City of San Sebastián honored Mislan's memory by naming a school after him and by placing a bust of his image in the center of its plaza.

== See also ==
- List of Puerto Ricans
