= Danza (disambiguation) =

Danza is a musical genre.

Danza may also refer to:

- Danza (ballet), a ballet choreographed by Martha Graham
- Danza (horse), an American racehorse
- Danza, an alternative name for the Chinese automobile brand Denza for the Indonesian market

== Music ==
- "La Danza", Rossini
- La danza (Gluck), opera

== People with the surname ==
- Tony Danza (born 1951), American actor

== See also ==
- Danzas (disambiguation)
- Denza (disambiguation)
