= José Enrique Pedreira =

Puerto Rican musician

- Born: February 2, 1904; San Juan, Puerto Rico
- Died: January 6, 1959 (aged 54) San Juan, Puerto Rico
- Genres: Danzas
- Instrument: Composer

José Enrique Pedreira (February 2, 1904 – January 6, 1959) was a Puerto Rican composer noted for danzas.

== Early years ==
Pedreira was one of four siblings born to José María Pedreira and Rosa Kehrham in San Juan, Puerto Rico. His family, who was financially prosperous, sent him to the best private schools in the island. He began to take private music lessons at a young age. In 1922, he graduated from high school and was sent to New York City, by his parents, to continue his musical education. He enrolled in the music school of Zygmunt Stojowski and learned piano and music composition. It was there that he met a fellow student who was to become his wife, Alicia Hutchinson. During his student years he composed his first work, the waltz “Alicia”.

== Musical career ==
In 1932, Pedreira returned to Puerto Rico with his wife and established the Pedreira Academy of Music in San Juan. He gave piano lessons while she (a pianist in her own right) gave piano and violin lessons. During his spare time he composed music and danzas for piano, violin and cello. The couple had one child, José Enrique “Quique” Pedreira Hutchinson.

== Musical compositions ==
Besides “Alicia”, his first composition, he composed "Canción Criolla" in 1934, for which he was awarded the Elzaburu priz from the Ateneo Puertorriqueño. He also composed "Concierto en re menor para piano y orquestra" (Concert in R minor for Piano and Orquestra) and in 1942, “Ensueño de Marta” his first danza. In October 1946. Pedreira's composition “Estudio de Concierto en Do Sostenido Menor” was included in Hilda Andino's concert at Carnegie Hall.

Pedreira also received many awards. He won a competition sponsored by the Juilliard School of Music in New York, with his composition "Tus Caricias" and a first prize for his danza "Siempre", during the celebration of Juan Morel Campos 100th birthday in 1957.

Many of his compositions were used by other Puerto Rican artists, among them Jesús Maria Sanromá and Graciela Rivera. His compositions were not all piano related. He also composed various works to be played on the violin.

In 1953, Pedreira and José Raúl Ramírez created the Dúo Piano-Organo “Pedreira-Ramírez”. The duo performed in various weekly radio and television programs. They also performed in various cities in the United States.

== Legacy ==
José Enrique Pedreira died on January 6, 1959, in San Juan, Puerto Rico. José Raúl Ramírez was petitioned by his widow, Alicia Hutchinson, to become custodian of his works. During the years, Ramírez published many of the works by Pedreira. In 1985, Pedreira was posthumously inducted into the Danza Composers Hall of Fame located in the town of San German, Puerto Rico.

== Selected compositions ==
- Canción de cuna para un infante moribundo (Lullaby for a Dying Child) for cello (or viola) and piano (1954)
- Caricias (Your Tender Touch)
- Colibrí
- Concerto in D minor for piano and orchestra
- Elegía India, Poema y Souvenir
- El Jardín de piedra (Garden of Rock), Ballet; libretto by Lotti Tischer
- Encanto
- Ensueño de Marta (Martha's Dream), Danza for piano (1956)
- Nocturne melancholique for piano (1950)
- No podrás olvidarme, Canción Bolero for voice and piano (1947)
- Plenitude, Nocturne for piano (1948)
- Ritmo, Zapateado for piano (1956)
- Siempre (Always), Danza for piano (1960); dedicated to Juan Morel Campos
- Sonata in B♭ minor for piano
- Súplica, Danza for piano (1949)
- Tus caricias, Danza for piano (1948)
- Vals en la major (Waltz in A major) for piano (1949)
- Valses de Concierto (Concert Waltzes)

== Awards and recognitions ==
Pedreira received many awards and recognitions during his lifetime. Some of the institutions that honored him were:

- The University of Puerto Rico
- The Puerto Rican Athenaeum
- The Juilliard School of Music
- The Women's Civic Club of San Juan

== See also ==
- List of Puerto Ricans
