= Danzas (disambiguation) =

Danzas was an international transport company with headquarters in Basel, Switzerland.

Danzas may also refer to:

- Danzas (surname)
- Plural of "danza" music form

== See also ==
- Danza (disambiguation)
