= Rullán =

Rullán is a surname. Notable people with the surname include:

- Francisco Rovira Rullán (born 1977), Puerto Rican art dealer
- Juan Rullán Rivera (1884–?), Puerto Rican politician
- Rafael Rullán (1952–2025), Spanish basketball player
