= Augusto Rodríguez (musician) =

Puerto Rican pianist, composer, chorus, band leader and director

Augusto Alejandro Rodríguez Amador
- Augusto Rodríguez was the founder of the Choir of the University of Puerto Rico

Background information
- Born: February 9, 1904; San Juan, Puerto Rico
- Died: January 5, 1993 (aged 88) Río Piedras, Puerto Rico
- Genres: Classical
- Occupations: Music composer and chorus director bandleader

Augusto Rodríguez a.k.a. "Tito" (February 9, 1904 – January 5, 1993) was a music composer pianist chorus bandleader and director. Augusto Rodríguez was the founder of the Choir of the University of Puerto Rico.

== Early years ==
Rodríguez, (birth name: Augusto Alejandro Rodríguez Amador) was born in the city of San Juan, the capital of Puerto Rico. Son of José Andrés Rodriguez Barril a hardware store owner and Carmen Amador Barril. He began taking music lessons under the guidance of Rosa Sicardó and Elisa Tavárez and, by the age of 12, played for an orchestra.

In 1920, Rodríguez graduated from the Escuela Superior Central de Santurce (Santurce Central High School). Rodríguez decided to become a doctor and enrolled in the University of Puerto Rico's school of medicine as a pre-med student. In 1932, Rodríguez abandoned his medical studies and went to Boston, where he studied music both at Harvard University and at the New England Conservatory of Music.

== Musical career ==
In 1934, Rodríguez returned to Puerto Rico to teach music at the University of Puerto Rico (UPR). He also served as director of the Puerto Rican Philharmonic. Two years later, Rodríguez founded the university's first choir, the Coro de la Universidad de Puerto Rico (Choir of the University of Puerto Rico), which was highly acclaimed by the critics. The choir performed in various cities in Central America, South America, the Caribbean, and in the main cities of the United States. Among the favorable critics was Noel Strauss, from The New York Times in his column of that papers May 30, 1949, edition, after witnessing the choir's performance at New York's Carnegie Hall.

Amongst the many notable members of the Coro de la Universidad de Puerto Rico were Justino Diaz, José Freire, Norman Veve, Paco O'Neill, Guiso Cosme, Carmencita Collazo, Sonia Cordero, and Lysette Alvarez. Rodríguez and Puerto Rican music legend Jesús María Sanromá helped get Justino Diaz a UPR scholarship to the New England Conservatory of Music. Rodríguez continued in his role as the director of the Coro de la Universidad de Puerto Rico until 1970.

Rodríguez was also the founder and director of two other choirs in Puerto Rico. They were Cantores del Instituto de Cultura Puertorriqueña and Coro del Festival de Opera de Puerto Rico. It is estimated that he composed over 150 works not only for the choirs - but also danzas, waltzes, and the film scores for numerous movie productions.

The development of Puerto Rico's local movie industry was regulated by the DIVEDCO Program (División de Educación de la Comunidad) from 1948 to 1991. Music was a very important part of the DIVEDCO film program from the beginning and Rodríguez composed the musical scores for El Santero (1956), a co-production with the University of Puerto Rico Museum, and for El Contemplado (1957).

== Awards and recognitions ==
In 1961, Rodríguez was the recipient of both the Puerto Rican Institute of Culture's and the Puerto Rican Athenaeum's Medal of Honor. He was also named professor emeritus and Resident composer of the University of Puerto Rico.

== Later years and legacy ==
Rodríguez was among the founders of Pro Arte Musical of Puerto Rico and served as president of "The Federation of Puerto Rican Musicians." He was also the founder of the Hebrew Festival Chorus of San Juan's Jewish Community and guest conductor of the Coro Radio Nacional de Espana.

On January 5, 1993, Rodríguez died in his residence in San Juan, Puerto Rico. He was buried at the Santa María Magdalena de Pazzis Cemetery. The city of San Juan honored his memory by naming a street Calle Prof. Augusto Rodriguez after him. In 1999, the alumni from the Coro de la Universidad de Puerto Rico that sang with Augusto Rodríguez reunited, under the direction of Norman Veve, to celebrate the fiftieth anniversary of their first appearance in Carnegie Hall.

== See also ==
- List of Puerto Ricans
