= Denza (disambiguation) =

Denza is an automotive brand by BYD (formerly a joint venture with Mercedes-Benz).

Denza may also refer to:

- Denza (musician) (born 1993), the stage name of the Dutch music producer Dimitri van Bronswijk
- Ciro Denza (1844–1915), Italian painter
- Francesco Denza (1934–1894), Italian meteorologist
- Luigi Denza (1846–1922), Italian composer

== See also ==
- Danza (disambiguation)
