= Odilio González =

Puerto Rican singer (born 1939)

Odilio González (born 5 March 1939), known by his stage name El Jibarito de Lares, is a Puerto Rican singer, guitarist and music composer who has been singing and composing for more than 65 years. He has mostly played traditional Puerto Rican folkloric music, songs dedicated to Puerto Rico's jíbaro.

== Career ==
González was born in 1939 in Piletas barrio in Lares, a municipality of Puerto Rico. He used to sing at funerals in Lares then became a popular child star after a series of early radio performances in the capital city of San Juan.

González has sung in the island's ancient traditional poetic song form, the décima (also known as "jíbaro" music), as well as performing mainstream pop music. His stage name is "El Jibarito de Lares". He debuted on the New York City stage in 1958, singing before Puerto Ricans in the Teatro Puerto Rico. His first recordings of traditional jíbaro, available from Ansonia Records, were recorded in New York City during that period. Fellow Lares native José Feliciano's singing style was influenced by González during his youth.

González crossed over into pop music in 1962, when he recorded Celos Sin Motivo, composed by Ismael Santiago. Another of his successful recordings was Yo Tenía Una Luz ("I had a light"), a Christmas song recorded in the early 1970s.

Gonzalez resides in Arecibo, Puerto Rico and continues to perform around the island as well as on trips to the United States to sing for older Puerto Rican expatriates, including a visit to Hawaii to sing before the Puerto Rican diaspora there.

== Selected discography ==
Some of González music includes:

=== Albums ===
- Cantando en el campo
- Jibarito De Lares

=== Singles ===
- Celos sin motivos
- Ruta de trenes

== See also ==
- List of Puerto Ricans
