= Melina León =

Puerto Rican merengue singer and actress (born 1973)

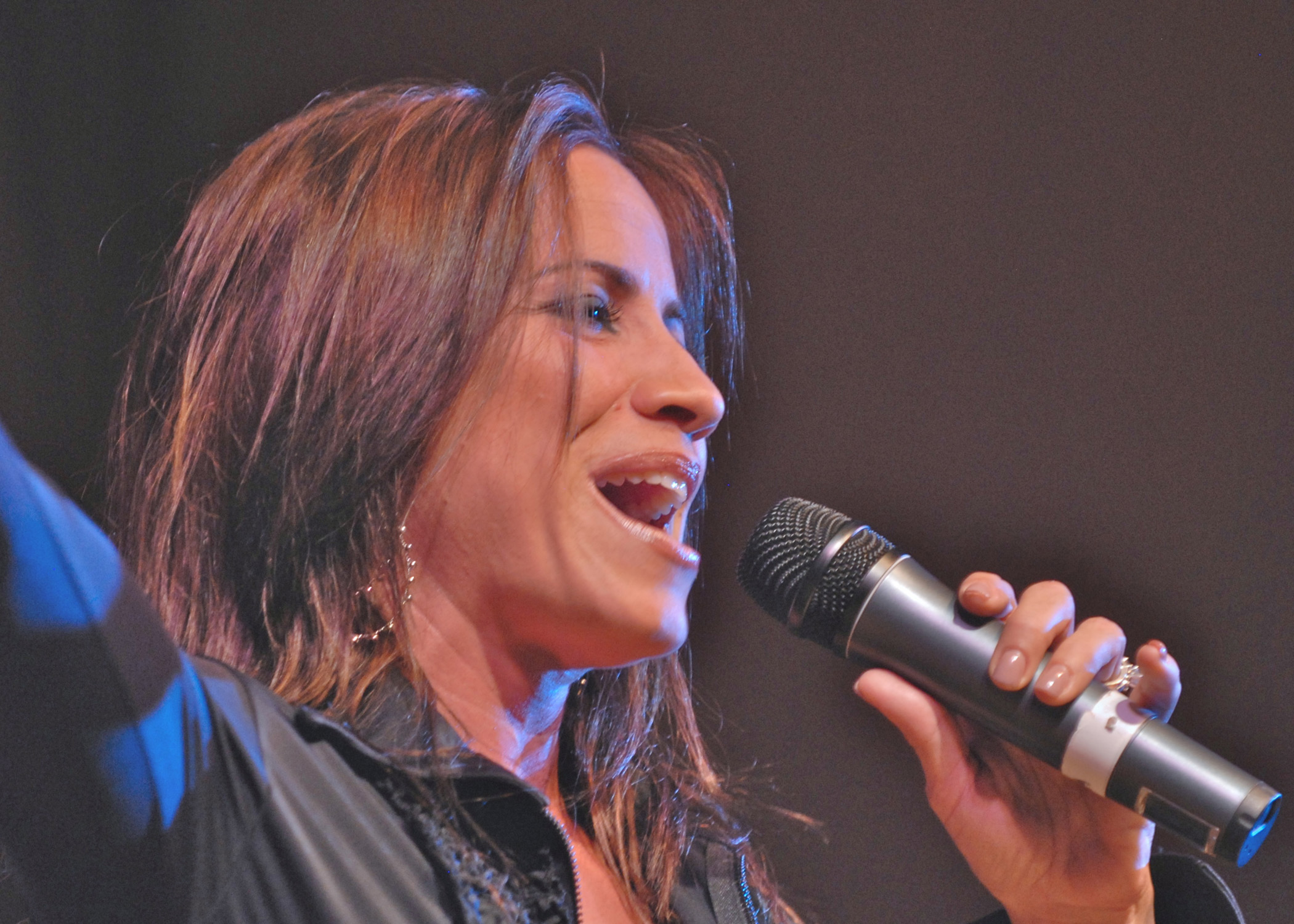
- Melina León
- Born: Yamillette Aponte Yunqué; 12 July 1973 (age 52); Río Piedras, Puerto Rico
- Occupation: Singer
- Years active: 1996–present

Melina León (born Yamillette Aponte Yunqué on 12 July 1973 in Río Piedras, Puerto Rico) is a Puerto Rican merengue singer and actress. From an early age she performed with several groups including The Rubi, Girls of Puerto Rico and The Cherries, with whom she appeared in several San Juan hotels. Her first recording, Mujeres Liberadas, appeared in 1997 on the Tropix Music label. This was followed in 1998 with a Sony release, Con Los Pies Sobre La Tierra. By 2003, she was also performing as an actress on television movies such as: "Yo Creo en Santa Claus" in 2004, broadcast by Televicentro in Puerto Rico, and Wapa America in the United States, among others, and has received several popular awards and had several successful albums and singles on the Billboard Tropical and Latin charts.

== Musical career ==
León started singing as a girl in musical festivals and music contests. At the age of 15, she joined a group called Las Cheris (The Cherries). After that she formed a group called Ruby which released an album through Independent Musical Productions.

Tropix Music signed her as a solo artist and she released her first album Mujeres Liberadas (Liberated Women) in 1997 which reached the top 10 of the Billboard tropical charts. The title track was a top 20 track on the Latin charts.

This attracted the interest of Sony Music who released her second album Con Los Pies Sobre La Tierra produced by Eduardo Reyes which made both the Billboard Latin and Billboard tropical album charts. Me Voy De Fiesta became another sizable hit single.

Baño de Luna was another top 10 Latin album when released and also won best female merengue singer by Premios de Musica 2000. Corazón de Mujer was another top 10 Latin album which was nominated for best tropical/salsa album in the 2002 Billboard Latin Awards. A self-titled album reached the top 15 of the Billboard tropical album charts in 2003 while she has also released an album called Serie Azul Tropical. In 2006, she recorded an album with the famous Colombian vocal group: Los Trío, and together taped a T.V. Special about it, broadcast by Tu Universo Television.

In 2010 Melina Leon won her first Premio Lo Nuestro Award as Best Tropical Female Artist. She is also an advocate for mother and kids.

She is featured on the single "No soy tu tipo" on J'Martin's album Para Ti.

== Boat accident ==
On Thursday, 2 April 2015, Melina Leon went to Culebra island for an Easter weekend vacation. While on their way to Culebrita island (an atoll off Culebra), a boat that she and her family and friends had boarded exploded, injuring a friend. Leon was uninjured in the accident.

== Discography ==
This is a discography of León's charting albums on Billboard's Latin and tropical charts.

- Mujeres Liberadas (1997) #9 Tropical/Salsa
  - singles Mujeres Liberadas, Ya No Soy Buena
- Con los Pies Sobre la Tierra (1998) #5 Tropical #26 Latin
  - singles Me Voy Fiesta Hoy, Te Crucifico O Te Santifico, Vieje Al Cielo, La Persona Equivocada,
- Baño de Luna (2000) #3 Tropical #8 Latin
  - singles Baño de Luna, Cuando Una Mujer, Siento
- Corazon de Mujer (2001) #1 Tropical #7 Latin #40 Heatseeker
  - Corazon de Mujer, Qué será de ti, Un Hombre de Verdad
- Melina León (2004) No. 14 Tropical
  - Quiero Ser Tuya
- Vas A Pagar...y sus Exitos (2007)
  - Vas A Pagar
- No Seas Cobarde (2008)
  - No Seas Cobarde
  - Todavia Duele
- Dos Caras (2010)
  - Nos Vamos De Fiesta
  - Caminando
