= Arístides Chavier Arévalo =

Puerto Rican musician

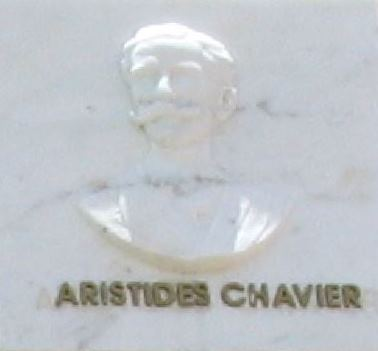
- Arístides Chavier Arévalo

Background information
- Born: Arístides Chavier Arévalo; 3 September 1867; Ponce, Puerto Rico
- Died: 23 July 1942 (aged 74) San Juan, Puerto Rico
- Genre: Modernism
- Occupations: Composer, musician, musicologist, music teacher, and music critic
- Instrument: Piano
- Years active: ca. 1892 – ca. 1940

Arístides Chavier Arévalo (3 September 1867 –1942) was a Puerto Rican pianist, modernism composer, musicologist and music author from Ponce, Puerto Rico.

== Early years and schooling ==
Chavier Arévalo was born in Ponce on 3 September 1867. In Ponce, he studied flute, but later abandoned it to focus on learning to play the piano. In 1884, when he was 17 years old, he traveled to New York, where he studied under pianist and composer Gonzalo Núñez and music master Frederick Doland, who taught him musical harmony. He quickly progressed in the development of his musical skills and in 1886 his parents sent him to study in France. He studied piano and music composition privately under Georges Mathias professor at the Conservatoire de Paris and musical harmony and composition under Antoine Taudou and Louis de Serres, who had trained with César Franck. His onstage musical delivery met with positive reviews from the paper El Progresso and the magazine Le Courier des Etats Unis.

== Professional debut ==
Immediately after completing his studies, Chavier Arévalo taught piano while in France. In 1892, he returned briefly to New York where he taught piano for a year but, as he could not take the weather there for health reasons, he returned to Ponce in 1893. While in Ponce he arranged successful musical presentations of his students to the public. In 1904, he submitted a group of his musical compositions for piano and orchestra to the Universal Exposition that was being held that year in St. Louis, Missouri, from 30 April through 1 December, and these were awarded a gold medal. In 1914, Chavier organized a far-reaching Musical Competition that was sponsored by the Liga Progresista de Ponce and held in that city that same year.

As a musician and music instructor, Chavier was admired by all as his technique was coherent and contained integrity. As a composer he created a vast library of compositions, mostly for piano and for string instruments. Unfortunately, most of his compositions were presented only in Ponce and were not internationalized. As a music critic and musicologist, Arístides Chavier published his essays in Puerto Rican papers of the times, and thanks to his fluency in French and English he translated many music writings from foreign publications into Spanish for the local public. While he did not dislike the then popular danza, he felt it should not be the only musical expression of the people and thus most of his musical productions were of a classical and modernistic nature. He created compositions for piano with two and four hands versions, for military ensembles, for orchestras and for string instruments.

== Outstanding works ==
Chavier composed many works for orchestra, band, piano and string instruments. Among Chavier Arévalo's highest achievements are Trío en mi bemol (Trio in B flat) for violin and cello, a Cuarteto en mi menor (Quartet in E minor) for two violins and a Quinteto en do menor (Quintet in C Minor). He also wrote Andante Cantabile Expresivo, the Obertura Puerto Rico for orchestra and Variaciones for the piano.

Chavier authored a music theory book entitled Siluetas Musicales published by Imprenta El Día in 1926 and the essay El arte musical puertorriqueño: su desarrollo y evolución hasta el presente (Puerto Rican Musical Art: its development and evolution until the present), published in "El Libro de Puerto Rico" by El Libro Azul Publishing, San Juan (Ed. Eugenio Fernández y García) in 1923. This was in addition to numerous articles on musical subjects, as well as compositions for local artists of pieces considered in the musical framework known as modernism.

== Students ==
Among Chavier Arévalo's students was Luis A. Ferré, a concert-level pianist who would later become governor of Puerto Rico. Arístides himself was a student of Gonzalo de J. Núñez (1850–1915), whose students include the internationally known musicians and composers Juan Morel Campos and Manuel Gregorio Tavárez. Another pupil was Monserrate Ferrer.

== Death and legacy ==
Arístides Chavier died in San Juan, Puerto Rico on 23 July 1942. Was buried at San José Cemetery in San Juan. He left over 80 compositions to the cultural enrichment of Puerto Ricans. Among his best known creations are "América, marcha triunfal en si bemol" (America: Triumphant March in B flat), "Aires de ballet en la menor" (Airs of Ballet in A minor), "Quinteto en do menor, para dos violines y dos pianos" (Quintet in C minor for two violins and two pianos) and "Marcha fúnebre en do menor" (Funeral March in C minor).

- In Ponce there is a government housing development named after him, which was inaugurated in the late 1950s by governor Luis Muñoz Marín. See a photo of Muñoz Marín's housing inauguration and a picture of Arístides Chavier
- In the Río Piedras district of San Juan there is a street named in his honor.
- In Ponce, Chavier is recognized at the Park of the Illustrious Ponce Citizens.

== See also ==
- Arístides Chavier: Humanista by Néstor Murray Irizarry. Published in 1993 by Casa Paoli. 267 pages, ISBN 1-881706-00-1
