= Monserrate Ferrer =

Monserrate Ferrer Otero, sometimes called Monsita Ferrer (January 7, 1885 - December 18, 1966) was a Puerto Rican composer and pianist.

Born in San Juan, Ferrer began piano lessons early in life with Rosa Sicardó and Ana Otero, later working with Jesús María Sanromá. With Julio Carlos de Arteaga she studied composition; later, in New York, she took lessons in counterpoint with Arístides Chavier Arévalo and in composition with Gonzalo Núñez Rivera. One of Puerto Rico's first women composers, in 1956 she was among the musicians selected by the Puerto Rican government as advisors on the creation of a national conservatory of music. Much of Ferrer's music remains unpublished. Her output consists largely of piano and chamber music, with some sacred and vocal pieces as well. Among her compositions are many danzas, a form which she sought to elevate out of popular culture; she also advocated for the standardization of musical notation within the genre. Her danza Ensueño de Gloria of 1913 received a prize from the Sociedad de Escritores y Artistas de Ponce. She died on December 18, 1966, in San Juan, Puerto Rico, and was buried at the Santa María Magdalena de Pazzis Cemetery in Old San Juan.
