= Jesús María Sanromá =

Puerto Rican pianist (1902–1984)

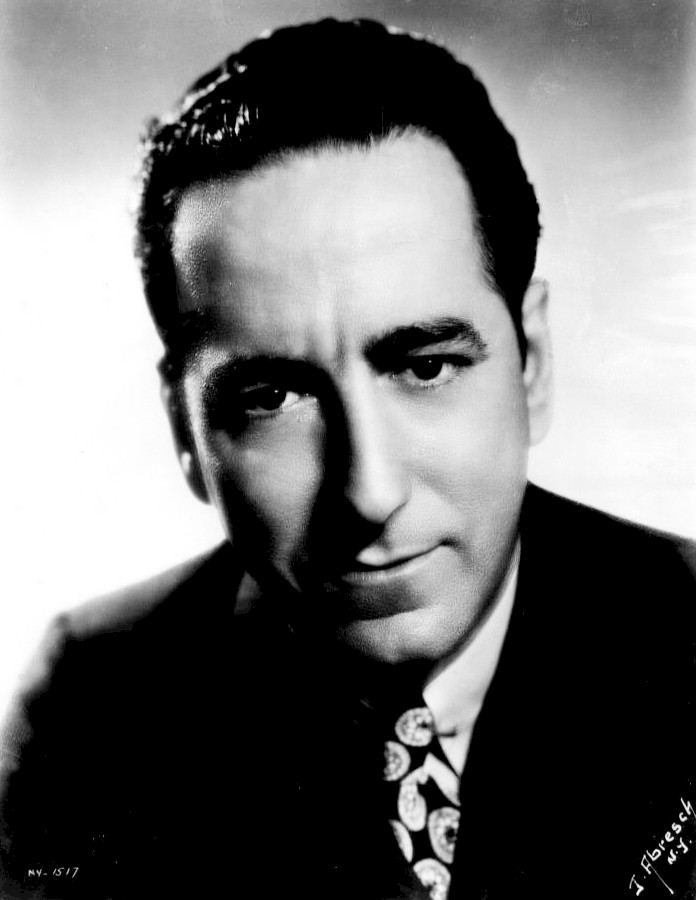
- Sanroma in 1953.

Background information
- Born: November 7, 1902; Carolina, Puerto Rico
- Died: October 12, 1984 (aged 81) San Juan, Puerto Rico
- Genres: Classical
- Occupation: Pianist
- Instrument: Piano

Jesús María Sanromá (November 7, 1902 – October 12, 1984) was a Puerto Rican pianist. In 1932 he performed in the North American premiere of Maurice Ravel's Piano Concerto in G conducted by Serge Koussevitzky.

== Early years ==
Sanromá's father, José María, was born in Barcelona, Spain, and studied at a Jesuit seminary but did not take his final orders to become a priest. After graduation from college, he became a political gadfly writing for a newspaper about the Spanish plebiscite. They recommended he take a hasty retreat to Puerto Rico with all expenses paid by the Spanish government. He settled in the town of Carolina, and later in the town of Fajardo. He sent for his girlfriend, María Torra de la Riba, but in 1894 women were not allowed to travel unmarried. They were married by proxy before she traveled to be with him. They had two sons, Juan Bautista born in Trujillo Alto in 1899 and Jesús María born in Carolina in 1902. José María earned a living in Fajardo by publishing a newspaper and teaching. Jesús María began playing his father's piano. José, realizing his son was talented, said, "If you are going to play the piano, then you shall go to school to study." He enrolled him at a music school located in the town of Fajardo to take piano lessons. In 1913, at the age of 11, Sanromá made his debut in the Fajardo Municipal Theater.

== Sanromá debuts ==
In January 1916, Sanromá debuted at the Puerto Rican Ateneo in San Juan, the island's capital. Unknown to him, José de Diego was amongst the public in the audience. So impressed was de Diego with Sanromá that he persuaded the government to give Sanromá a grant of 600 dollars. The grant was to be used to further his musical education in the United States.

Sanromá enrolled in the New England Conservatory of Music in Boston, Massachusetts, and studied piano with David Sequeira. He graduated in 1920 and was awarded the Mason and Hamlin Prize. Shortly after his graduation he earned the position of official pianist of the Boston Symphony Orchestra, becoming the first person to receive such an honor. He continued studies with Polish pianist Antoinette Szumowska-Adamowska at NEC from 1920 to 1927, and later took additional classes with Alfred Cortot in Paris (June–July 1927) and with Artur Schnabel in Berlin (September–October 1927).

== Boston Symphony Orchestra ==
Sanromá worked with various composers, such as Igor Stravinsky and Sergei Prokofiev, but it was the future conductor of the Boston Pops Orchestra (a subsection of the Boston Symphony Orchestra), Arthur Fiedler, with whom he was to develop an artistic relationship that was to last for many years. In 1932 he gave the first North American performance of Maurice Ravel's Concerto in G under the baton of Serge Koussevitzky, the same day as Sylvan Levin did with the Philadelphia Orchestra. He was the soloist in the first complete recording of George Gershwin's Rhapsody in Blue, with Fiedler and the Boston Pops for RCA Victor in July 1935. They also made the first recording of Edward MacDowell's Second Concerto (1934). Sanromá resigned as official pianist for the BSO after 20 years of service. During his amazing career Sanromá collaborated and recorded with composers such as Paul Hindemith, Walter Piston, Ernst Toch, Heitor Villa-Lobos, Hector Campos Parsi, Vladimir Dukelsky, Edward Burlingame Hill, John Carpenter, Juan José Castro, Ernst Bloch, Carlos Chavez, Igor Stravinsky, Pablo Casals and Leonard Bernstein.

== Sanromá Concerts ==
External audio
- You may listen to Jesus Maria Sanroma play Liszt Totentanz Paraphrase on "Dies Irae" for Piano and Orchestra on YouTube.

In 1952, he returned to Puerto Rico and was named musical consultant of the Department of Music of the University of Puerto Rico. Sanromá presented a series of "Sanromá Concerts" until 1975. In 1956, he was named member of the organizing committee of the Music Conservatory of Puerto Rico. He was also an active participant in the Pablo Casals Festivals. Sanromá recorded over 38 albums for RCA Victor and Columbia, besides his 13 albums devoted to 154 danzas by Juan Morel Campos. Sanromá traveled and performed throughout the world. Amongst the 21 countries in which he performed were Germany, France, Austria, Spain, England, the United States, Canada, Venezuela and the rest of Latin America.

== Later years ==
Among the many awards and recognitions bestowed upon Sanromá were Doctor Honoris Causa degrees from the New England Conservatory of Music, University of Puerto Rico, University of Miami, St. Peter's College and Boston College. Pope Paul VI named him a Knight of the Order of Saint Sylvester.

Sanromá died on October 12, 1984, in San Juan, Puerto Rico at the age of 82. His death coincided with a visit of Pope John Paul II to Puerto Rico. Former governor Luis A. Ferré, his former classmate at the New England Conservatory of Music and lifelong friend, requested a papal blessing for Sanromá from the pope, which the pope conceded. Sanromá was buried in the Porta Coeli Cemetery in Bayamon, Puerto Rico.

== Legacy ==
The government of Puerto Rico honored his memory by naming a school in the town of Carolina and a concert hall in the Music Conservatory of Puerto Rico after him. He is also included in the township of Carolina's Galeria de los Gigantes (or hall of fame) Sala Jesús María Sanromá.

Among Sanromá's pupils was Monserrate Ferrer.

== See also ==
- List of Puerto Ricans
- Jesus Maria Sanroma: An American Twentieth Century Pianist, Scarecrow Press, 2008.
