= Juan Ríos Ovalle =

Puerto Rican musician and composer of danzas

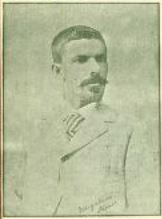
- Juan Ríos Ovalle, photo from ca. 1907

Background information
- Born: 1863
- Origin: Ponce, Puerto Rico
- Died: 1928; Ponce, Puerto Rico
- Genres: Danza
- Occupation(s): Composer, musician, orchestra director
- Instrument: Clarinet
- Years active: 1883–1928
- Labels: RCA Victor

Juan Ríos Ovalle (1863–1928) was a Puerto Rican musician and composer of danzas. Among his most popular danzas are: Angelina, La Graciosita (The Little Funny One), Lluvia de Perlas (Rain of Pearls), Odalisca, and Teresa.

== Early years ==
Born in 1863 in Ponce, Puerto Rico into a family of musicians, Ríos Ovalle became a prolific clarinet musician and danza composer. He also composed aguinaldos, hymns, danzones and sacred music. He did not possess a lot of formal education, yet had a natural talent for music.

== Professional career ==
Rios Ovalle was one of the few confidants of Juan Morel Campos, among whom was also musician Cosme Tizol. While not possessing the professional stature or scale of Morel Campos, he was nevertheless considered the unquestionable successor to him, in particular when it came to danzas. Some experts believe that had Rios Ovalle been exposed to greater music education, it is possible he would have climbed much higher yet in his impact as a musician and composer.

=== Composer ===
He created over 50 musical compositions. His danzas are characterized by their high lyrical character. Upon the untimely death of master Morel Campos in 1896, Ríos Ovalle succeeded him as the most prolific representative of Ponce's danza tradition. He authored various well known compositions, including "Angelina", "Teresa", "Rain of pearls", "Odalisque" and "La Graciosita".

=== Musicican ===
Ríos Ovalle fine tuned his musical skills in the Juan Morel Campos's Orchestra, where he played first clarinet. His name became well known in Puerto Rico as well as among musicians and composers internationally.

=== Orchestra director ===
In addition to his clarinet and composer skills, he was an outstanding orchestra director. His danzas are arrhythmic and his Orchestra used the güiro as the only percussion instrument.

== Recordings ==
He recorded with RCA Victor Records in 1917 and 1921. Some of his recording were with the Paco Tizol Orchestra.

== Delicias sextet ==
For many years Rios Ovalle has a sextet that performed at the famed Teatro Fox Delicias. Its job was to provide a musical background for the soundless movies of the early 20th century played there. His sextet would have a preview of the soundless movie prior to its premiere showing and they would practice for hours several nights before the movie's opening night. Renown pianist Antonia "Toñita" Príncipe ("the Princess of the keyboard") would provide coverage in the piano. In addition to soundless movies, Rios Ovalle sextet also interpreted arias for local operas voices including Aida, Lucia y Casta Susana.

== Compositions ==
The following is a list of some of Rios Ovalle's danzas:

- Angelina
- Teresa
- Lluvia de Perlas (Rain of Pearls)
- Odalisca
- La Graciosita (The Little Funny One)

== Later years ==
He died in 1928 in Ponce, Puerto Rico.

== Legacy ==
- There a relief sculpture on the right front wall face of the Concha Acustica de Ponce engraved with his face and shoulders as well as his name.

== See also ==
- List of Puerto Ricans
- List of Puerto Rican songwriters
- List of people from Ponce, Puerto Rico
