= Danzas (surname) =

The surname Danzas may refer to

- Louis Danzas, founder of DHL Global Forwarding
- Julia Danzas (1879–1942), Russian historian of religion, a Catholic theologian, writer and a Catholic female religious leader
- Konstantin Danzas (1801–1870), Russian Major General, mostly known as a friend of Alexander Pushkin
