= Las Cheris =

Puerto Rican girl group

Las Cheris was a Puerto Rican girl group of the early 1980s and 1990s composed of four girls aged 16 to 25. The band's manager and owner of the group was Mr. Juan Rivera Muriente

After Menudo's worldwide success, many other bands in Latin America, and particularly in Puerto Rico, tried to emulate Menudo's success, including girl bands. Las Cheris was one of these bands and Fresitas and Monedas were other ones. Las Cheris and Monedas, for example, pointed out in such magazines as Vea and others, that they wanted to be the "female version of Menudo".

Las Cheris enjoyed popularity on Puerto Rican radio and TV from 1983 to 1990. After that period, they faded away. However, one of them, Melina León, is now enjoying success as an international merengue singer. Mariadony Class, another member of the group, is the daughter of another Puerto Rican singer, José Miguel Class.
