= Elisa Tavárez =

Puerto Rican musician

- Birth name: Elisa Tavárez Colón
- Born: June 21, 1879
- Origin: Ponce, Puerto Rico
- Died: April 4, 1960, Santurce, Puerto Rico
- Genres: Danza
- Occupation(s): Musician, pianist
- Instrument: Piano
- Years active: 1879–1960

Elisa Tavárez (1879–1960) was a Puerto Rican pianist.

== Early years ==
Elisa Tavárez Colón was born in Ponce, Puerto Rico, to the "father of the dance" Manuel Gregorio Tavárez and Elisa Colón Colón

== Training and career ==
Tavárez studied music education in Spain under Pilar de la Mora at the Madrid Conservatory, and always won first place in her concerts and auditions. She was invited to perform before the Queen of Spain, also earning well-deserved applause. After returning to Puerto Rico where she also presented concerts, she presented additional concerts in Central America, Cuba, and the United States.

== Death ==
Elisa Tavárez died on April 4, 1960, in Santurce, Puerto Rico at age 80. She is buried at the Buxeda Cemetery in Carolina, Puerto Rico.

== Accolades ==
She is recognized in Ponce at the Park of Illustrious Ponce Citizens.

== See also ==
- List of Puerto Ricans
