= Music of Puerto Rico =

The music of Puerto Rico has evolved as a heterogeneous and dynamic product of diverse cultural resources. The most conspicuous musical sources of Puerto Rico have primarily included African, Taino Indigenous, and European influences. Puerto Rican music culture today comprises a wide and rich variety of genres, ranging from essentially native genres such as bomba, jíbaro, seis, danza, and plena to more recent hybrid genres such as salsa, Latin trap and reggaeton. Broadly conceived, the realm of "Puerto Rican music" should naturally comprise the music culture of the millions of people of Puerto Rican descent who have lived in the United States, especially in New York City. Their music, from salsa to the boleros of Rafael Hernández, cannot be separated from the music culture of Puerto Rico itself.

== Traditional, folk, and popular music ==
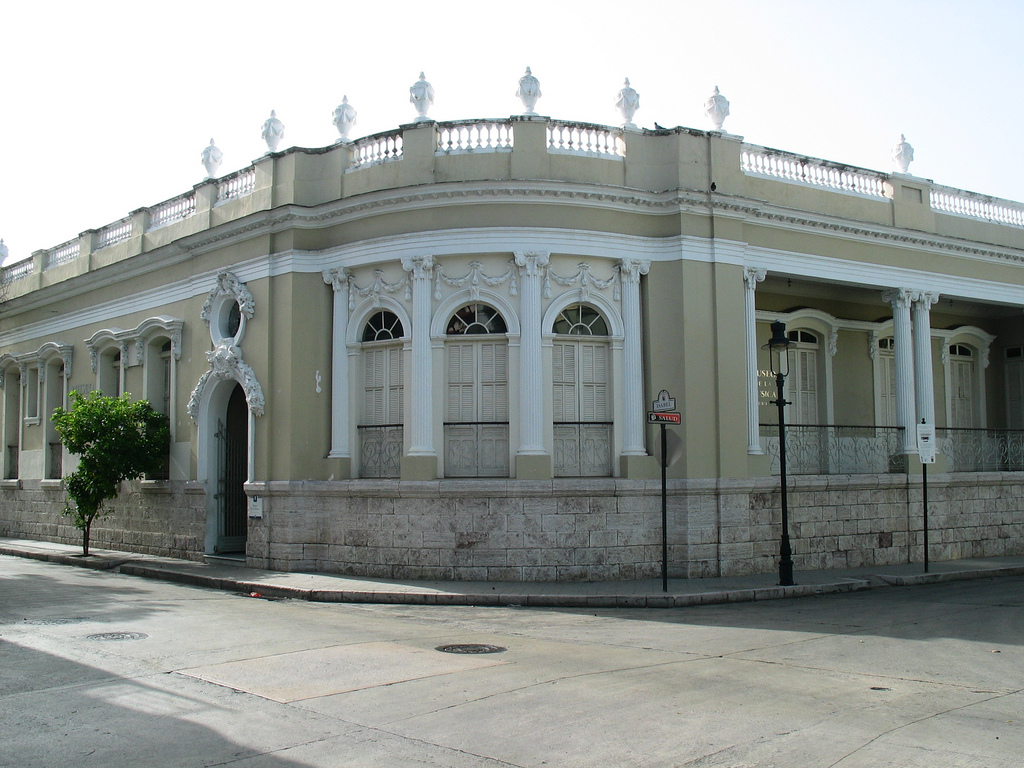
The Museum of Puerto Rican Music in Ponce

=== Early music ===
The music culture in Puerto Rico during the 16th, 17th, and 18th centuries is poorly documented. Certainly, it included Spanish troubadour, church music, military band music, and diverse genres of dance music cultivated by the jíbaros and enslaved Africans and their descendants. While these later never constituted more than 11% of the island's population, they contributed to some of the island's most dynamic musical features becoming unforgettable and distinct indeed.

On September 19, 1512, the customs house Casa de la Contratación recorded the first known instance of a European music instrument to Puerto Rico, a small vihuela property of Alonso de Buenaño. These were popular with the early settlers, and by November 1513, proved enough for merchant Juan de Vizcaínos to import eighteen rolls for them. On January 3, 1516, Catalina Ortiz brought with her a tambourine. Vihuelas continued arriving from several sources during this year. The first guitar on record arrived on December 11, 1516, property of Juan Martín. With the arrival of these instruments and the villancico, Christmas traditions became established. Eventually, the vihuela was adapted by the locals, giving birth to the Puerto Rican cuatro. With time, the Spanish dulcimer and atabes were replaced by the mbira and the conga, as African culture was assimilated.

The Dutch invasion of San Juan in 1625 damaged the records of the Catholic Church, and with it any material related to music. It is known that at least by 1660, the cathedral had an organ player and a plainchant singer. A maestro was introduced in 1672. On June 23, 1684, bishop Francisco de Padilla made a request for two to four hornpipe players. The baile de los seis became popular at Puerto Rico, incorporating a number with children accompanied by a harp and mulato women accompanied by two guitars. The bishop didn't sympathize with the practice and requested help from the King. Beginning in 1698, the musical offices of the Church were vacant, in part because of black and mulato artists being the ones interested in filling them. In 1749, Ferdinand VI ordered equal participation, and by 1756 these were filled again. Among the musicians that filled these roles was José Campeche, who would later gain prominence as a painter, serving as maestro of the Convento de las Carmelitas. These religious institutions were the center of European style music entering the 18th Century. Folk music and instruments were present in popular culture, incorporated as part of dances.

In the 19th century Puerto Rican music begins to emerge into historical daylight, with notated genres like danza being naturally better documented than folk genres like jíbaro music and bomba y plena. The 19th Century and the outbreak of the Bolívarian wars throughout South America led to more fortification of Puerto Rico, which in turn brought military bands that popularized operas. The Sociedad de Amigos del Pais (est. 1813), Sociedad Filarmónica (1823) and the Ateneo Puertorriqueño (1876) led to cultural initiatives. As did the creation of a new municipal theater. Operas such as El barbero de Sevilla (shown in 1835) made their way to Puerto Rico earlier than to the United States. And by 1842, Marino Faliero, Beatrice di Tenda and Gemma de Vergy were shown by the Busatti Company and harmonized by local musicians. Six years later, this group introduced Lucrecia Borgia and Lucia di Lammermoor, which featured Félix Astol (speculated to be the author of La Borinqueña).

Parallel to this, freed blacks would celebrate events like Epiphany by performing with marimbas and timpani, fueling endemic rhythms. The African people of the island used drums made of carved hardwood covered with untreated rawhide on one side, commonly made from goatskin. A popular word derived from creole to describe this drum was shukbwa, which translates to 'trunk of tree'. After the arrival of African slaves, Bomba became the music of the people.

In 1875, the provincial deputation decided to push musical education for the orphans at the Asilo de Beneficiencia. Rosario Arturi was placed in charge of the classes, remaining teacher until his death in 1878. Sandalio Callejo succeeded him, introducing cord instruments and a religious orchestra. Graduates joined military bands and other local groups. Callejo was succeeded by Jaime Bastard Tizol. The Church also expanded its musical presence, with three orchestras, placed in charge of Felipe Gutiérrez Espinosa (Cathedral) Sandalio Callejo (San Francisco) and Gregorio Ledesma (San José). In 1887, José Gotós created a piano school at Mayagüez. Others such as composer Rosario Aruti, Carlos Allard (flute), Juan Inés Ramos & José Álvarez (clarinet) and José Cabrizas (piano) did the same in their respective expertise.

In March 1898, Fernando Callejo and other musicians pushed for an educational initiative within the education system, which would include the harmonium, organ and saxophone. Grants were to be offered to students that wanted to continue studying abroad. Following the Spanish-American War, the Church stopped being the main player within local music. Francisco Verar was the teacher of the Asilo de Beneficiencia during this time, and the last. The municipal theatre continued hosting opera under the new colonial regime, where groups like Augusto Azzali's and Adolfo Bracales's companies making presentations early in the 20th Century. Military bands also recruited locally, with Rafael Hernández joining the Hellfighters of the 369th Infantry in 1917.

In the early 20th century “musica Jíbara” gained recording momentum, and poet or troubadour-jíbaro artists were recording music in Puerto Rico as well as New York. Names such as Florencio Morales Ramos ("Ramito") (1915 – 1989), Odilio Gonzalez ("El Jibarito de Lares") (born 1937), Alfonso Vélez ("Jíbaro de Añasco") (born 1939), and Nito Mendez (1941 – 2011), saw lots of studio time, influencing new sounds in the Caribbean.

On March 8, 1913, efforts were made to create a music conservatorium, the Academia de Música, Canto y Declamación giving control to the Universidad de Puerto Rico (UPR) and the speaker of the House of Representatives of Puerto Rico over the initiative. The project, however, was not passed. In 1914, the Boys Charity School and its counterpart Girls Charity School served as the alma mater of several musicians that later joined municipal and other bands and orchestras. Among these was Rafael Bracero López. While places like the Victory Garden continued to successfully host operas, Julio C. Arteaga decided to create an academy in 1920.

During Theodore Roosevelt Jr.'s governorship, Arístides Chavier led a group that wanted to create a music conservatorium, but the governor preferred folk music to the European style that they favored. Roosevelt would later recognize Epiphany as a celebration. During the 1930s, Antonio Paoli created the Conservatorio Paoli, which later organized a rendition of Cavalleria rusticana in a tour de force to prove the efficacy of his teaching methods. Pro Arte Musical debuted on July 16, 1932, holding more concerts afterwards and graduating several musicians. On August 27, 1933, Augusto Rodríguez introduced his philharmonic orchestra. During the 1940s, the UPR's Department of Cultural Activities invited several acts to perform, both local and international, including the first presentation of Rafael Hernández's zarzuela Cofresí.

In 1946, the Escuela Libre de Música program was established, becoming a cornerstone of music education throughout the remainder of the century. During the 1950s, Guayama mayor Obdulia Velázquez created a municipal band, several more would follow throughout the next decades. By 1952, Ernesto Ramos Antonini began pushing for the creation of a music conservatorium. This coincided with the arrival of several European opera companies and the organization of five opera festivals, the first two (1954–55) were supported by the UPR. The university's chorus joined local figures like Flavia Acosta, Graciela Rivera, Félix Caballero and María Esther Robles. Afterwards, Ángel Ramos sponsored 1956–57, through El Mundo.

=== Folk music ===
If the term "folk music" is taken to mean music genres that have flourished without elite support, and have evolved independently of the commercial mass media, the realm of Puerto Rican folk music would comprise the primarily Hispanic-derived jíbaro music, the Afro-Puerto Rican bomba, and the essentially "creole" plena. As these three genres evolved in Puerto Rico and are unique to that island, they occupy a respected place in island culture, even if they are not currently as popular as contemporary music such as salsa or reggaeton.

==== Jíbaro music ====
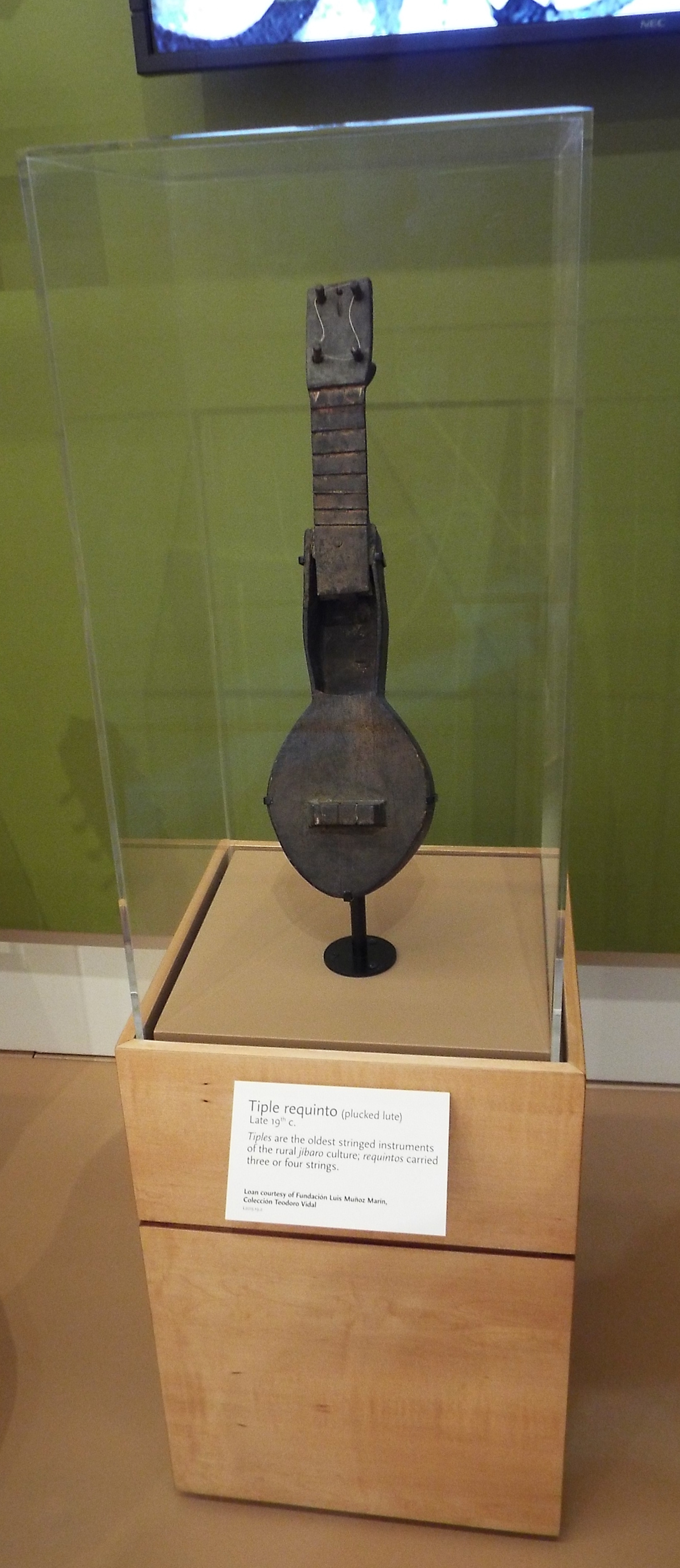
A Tiple Requinto (1880) from Puerto Rico

Jíbaros are small farmers of mixed descent who constituted the overwhelming majority of the Puerto Rican population until the mid-twentieth century. They are traditionally recognized as romantic icons of land cultivation, hard-working, self-sufficient, hospitable, and with an innate love of song and dance. Their instruments were relatives of the Spanish vihuela, especially the cuatro — which evolved from four single strings to five pairs of double strings — and the lesser known tiple. A typical jíbaro group nowadays might feature a cuatro, guitar, and percussion instrument such as the güiro scraper and/or bongo. Lyrics to jíbaro music are generally in the décima form, consisting of ten octosyllabic lines in the rhyme scheme ABBA ACCDDC. Décima form derives from 16th century Spain. Although it has largely died out in that country (except the Canaries), it took root in various places in Latin America—especially Cuba and Puerto Rico—where it is sung in diverse styles. A sung décima might be pre-composed, derived from a publication by some literati, or ideally, improvised on the spot, especially in the form of a “controversia” in which two singer-poets trade witty insults or argue on some topic. In between the décimas, lively improvisations can be played on the cuatro. This music form is also known as "típica" as well as "trópica".

The décimas are sung to stock melodies, with standardized cuatro accompaniment patterns. About twenty such song types are in common use. These are grouped into two broad categories, viz., seis (e.g., seis fajardeño, seis chorreao) and aguinaldo (e.g., aguinaldo orocoveño, aguinaldo cayeyano). Traditionally, the seis could accompany dancing, but this tradition has largely died out except in tourist shows and festivals. The aguinaldo is most characteristically sung during the Christmas season, when groups of revelers (parrandas) go from house to house, singing jíbaro songs and partying. The aguinaldo texts are generally not about Christmas, and also unlike Anglo-American Christmas carols, they are generally sung by a solo with the other revelers singing the chorus. In general, the Christmas season is a time when traditional music—both seis and aguinaldo—is most likely to be heard. Fortunately, many groups of Puerto Ricans are dedicated to preserving traditional music through continued practice.

Jíbaro music came to be marketed on commercial recordings in the twentieth century, and singer-poets like Ramito (Flor Morales Ramos, 1915–90) are well documented. However, jíbaros themselves were becoming an endangered species, as agribusiness and urbanization have drastically reduced the numbers of small farmers on the island. Many jíbaro songs dealt accordingly with the vicissitudes of migration to New York. Jíbaro music has in general declined accordingly, although it retains its place in local culture, especially around Christmas time and special social gatherings, and there are many cuatro players, some of whom have cultivated prodigious virtuosity.

==== Bomba ====
Historical references indicate that by the decades around 1800 plantation slaves were cultivating a music and dance genre called bomba. By the mid-twentieth century, when it started to be recorded and filmed, bomba was performed in regional variants in various parts of the island, especially Loíza, Ponce, San Juan, and Mayagüez. It is not possible to reconstruct the history of bomba; various aspects reflect Congolese derivation, though some elements (as suggested by subgenre names like holandés) have come from elsewhere in the Caribbean. French Caribbean elements are particularly evident in the bomba style of Mayagüez, and striking choreographic parallels can be seen with the bélé of Martinique. All of these sources were blended into a unique sound that reflects the life of the Jibaro, the slaves, and the culture of Puerto Rico.

In its call-and-response singing set to ostinato-based rhythms played on two or three squat drums (barriles), bomba resembles other neo-African genres in the Caribbean. Of clear African provenance is its format in which a single person emerges from an informal circle of singers to dance in front of the drummers, engaging the lead drummer in a sort of playful duel; after dancing for a while, that person is then replaced by another. While various such elements can be traced to origins in Africa or elsewhere, bomba must be regarded as a local Afro-Puerto Rican creation. Its rhythms (e.g. seis corrido, yubá, leró, etc.), dance moves, and song lyrics that sometimes mimic farm animals (in Spanish, with some French creole words in eastern Puerto Rico) collectively constitute a unique Puerto Rican genre.

In the 1950s, the dance-band ensemble of Rafael Cortijo and Ismael Rivera performed several songs in they had labeled as "bombas"; although these bore some similarities to the sicá style of bomba, in their rhythms and horn arrangements they also borrowed noticeably from the Cuban dance music which had long been popular in the island. Giving rise to Charanga music. As of the 1980s, bomba had declined, although it was taught, in a somewhat formalized fashion, by the Cepeda family in Santurce, San Juan, and was still actively performed informally, though with much vigor, in the Loíza towns, home to the then Ayala family dynasty of bomberos. Bomba continues to survive there and has also experienced something of a revival, being cultivated by folkloric groups such as Son Del Batey, Los Rebuleadores de San Juan, Bomba Evolución, Abrane y La Tribu, and many more elsewhere on the island. In New York City with groups such as Los Pleneros de la 21, members of La Casita de Chema, and Alma Moyo. In Chicago Buya, and Afro-Caribe have kept the tradition alive and evolving. In California Bomba Liberte, Grupo Aguacero, Bombalele, La Mixta Criolla, Herencia de los Carrillo, and Los Bomberas de la Bahia are all groups that have promoted and preserved the culture. Women have also played a role in its revival, as in the case of the all-female group Yaya, Legacy Woman, Los Bomberas de la Bahia, Grupo Bambula (Originally female group), and Ausuba in Puerto Rico.

There has also been a strong commitment towards Bomba Fusion. Groups such as Los Pleneros de la 21, and Viento De Agua have contributed greatly towards fusing Bomba and Plena with Jazz and other Genres. Yerbabuena has brought a popular cross-over appeal. Abrante y La Tribu have made fusions with Hip Hop. Tambores Calientes, Machete Movement, and Ceiba have fused the genres with various forms of Rock and Roll.

The Afro-Puerto Rican bombas, developed in the sugarcane haciendas of Loíza, the northeastern coastal areas, in Guayama and southern Puerto Rico, utilize barrel drums and tambourines, while the rural version uses stringed instruments to produce music, relating to the bongos. (1) “The bomba is danced in pairs, but there is no contact. The dancers each challenge the drums and musicians with their movements by approaching them and performing a series of fast steps called floretea piquetes, creating a rhythmic discourse. Unlike normal dance routines, the drummers are the ones who follow the performers and create a beat or rhythm based on their movements. Women who dance bomba often use dresses or scarves to enhance bodily movements. Unlike normal dance terms, the instruments follow the performer.

Like other such traditions, bomba is now well documented on sites like YouTube, and a few ethnographic documentary films.

==== Plena ====
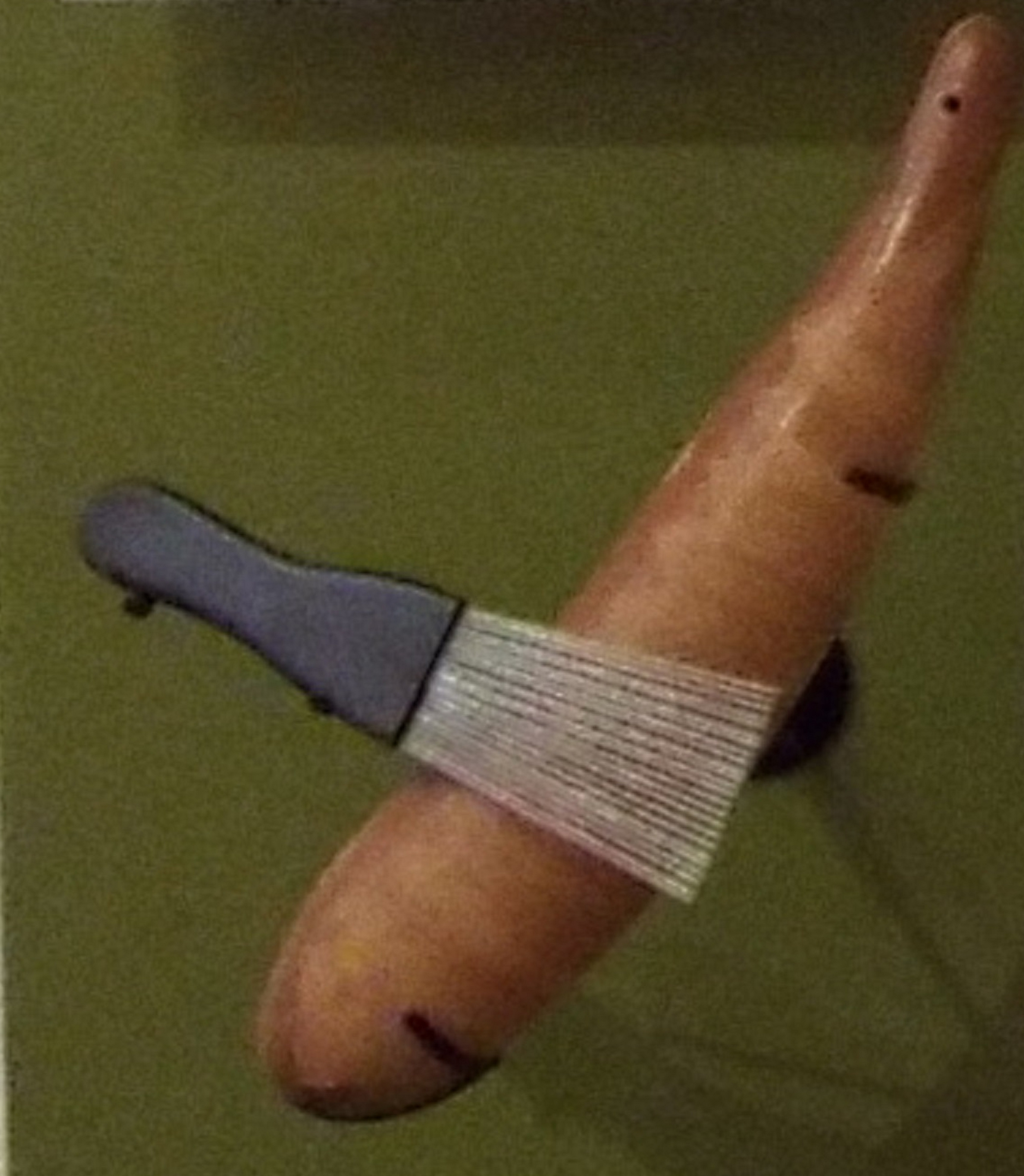
Puerto Rican Güiro

Around 1900 plena emerged as a humble proletarian folk genre in the lower-class, largely Afro-Puerto Rican urban neighborhoods in San Juan, Ponce, and elsewhere. Plena subsequently came to occupy its niche in island music culture. In its quintessential form, plena is an informal, unpretentious, simple folk-song genre, in which alternating verses and refrains are sung to the accompaniment of round, often homemade frame drums called panderetas (like tambourines without jingles), perhaps supplemented by accordion, guitar, or whatever other instruments might be handy. An advantage of the percussion arrangement is its portability, contributing to the plena's spontaneous appearance at social gatherings. Other instruments commonly heard in plena music are the cuatro, the maracas, and accordions.

The plena rhythm is a simple duple pattern, although a lead pandereta player might add lively syncopations. Plena melodies tend to have an unpretentious, "folksy" simplicity. Some early plena verses commented on barrio anecdotes, such as "Cortarón a Elena" (They stabbed Elena) or "Allí vienen las maquinas" (Here come the firetrucks). Many had a decidedly irreverent and satirical flavor, such as "Llegó el obispo" mocking a visiting bishop. Some plenas, such as "Cuando las mujeres quieren a los hombres" and "Santa María," are familiar throughout the island. In 1935 the essayist Tomás Blanco celebrated plena—rather than the outdated and elitist danza—as an expression of the island's fundamentally creole, Taino or mulatto racial and cultural character. Plenas are still commonly performed in various contexts; a group of friends attending a parade or festival may bring a few panderetas and burst into song, or new words will be fitted to the familiar tunes by protesting students or striking workers which have long been a regular form of protest from occupation and slavery. While enthusiasts might on occasion dance to a plena, plena is not characteristically oriented toward dance.

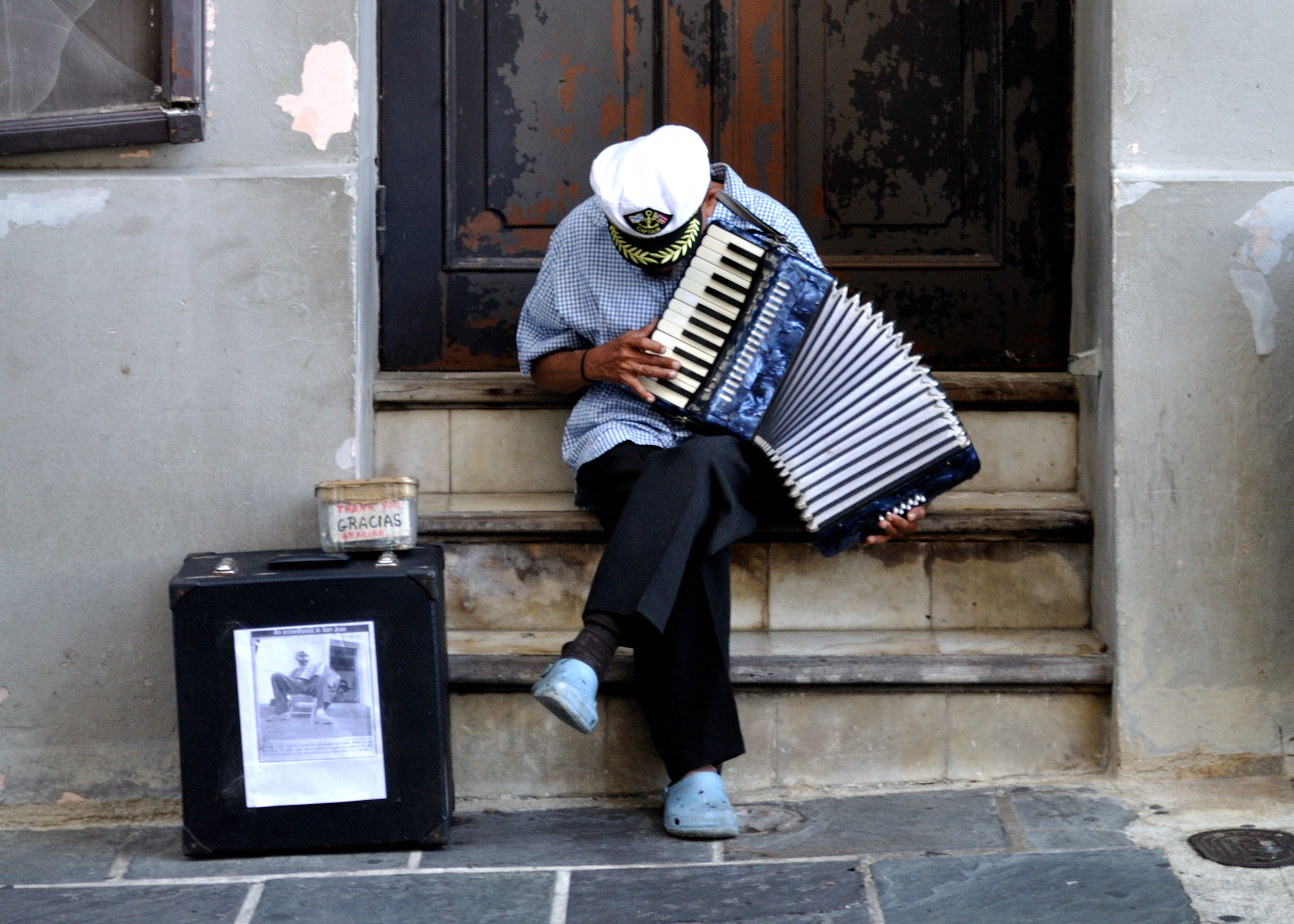
Old man playing the accordion in Old San Juan

In the 1920s–30s plenas came to be commercially recorded, especially by Manuel "El Canario" Jimenez, who performed old and new songs, supplementing the traditional instruments with piano and horn arrangements. In the 1940s Cesar Concepción popularized a big-band version of plena, lending the genre a new prestige, to some extent at the expense of its proletarian vigor and sauciness. In the 1950s a newly invigorated plena emerged as performed by the smaller band of Rafael Cortijo and vocalist Ismael "Maelo" Rivera, attaining unprecedented popularity and modernizing the plena while recapturing its earthy vitality. Many of Cortijo's plenas present colorful and evocative vignettes of barrio life and lent a new sort of recognition to the dynamic contribution of Afro-Puerto Ricans to the island's culture (and especially music). This period represented the apogee of plena's popularity as a commercial popular music. Unfortunately, Rivera spent much of the 1960s in prison, and the group never regained its former vigor. Nevertheless, the extraordinarily massive turnout for Cortijo's funeral in 1981 reflected the beloved singer's enduring popularity. By then, however, plena's popularity had been replaced by that of salsa, although some revivalist groups, such as Plena Libre, continue to perform in their lively fashion, while "street" plena is also heard on various occasions.

=== Danza ===
External audio
- You may listen to Graciela Rivera's interpretation of Fernández Juncos' version of "La Borinqueña"" here.
- You may listen to Luciano Quiñones piano interpretation of Tavárez's "Margarita"here
- You may listen to Luciano Quiñones piano interpretation of Morel Campos' "No me toques" here

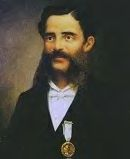
Manuel Gregorio Tavárez

By the late 1700s, the country dance (French contredanse, Spanish contradanza) had come to thrive as a popular recreational dance, both in courtly and festive vernacular forms, throughout much of Europe, replacing dances such as the minuet. By 1800 a creolized form of the genre, called contradanza, was thriving in Cuba, and the genre also appears to have been extant, in similar vernacular forms, in Puerto Rico, Venezuela, and elsewhere, although documentation is scanty. By the 1850s, the Cuban contradanza—increasingly referred to as danza—was flourishing both as a salon piano piece, or as a dance-band item to accompany social dancing, in a style evolving from collective figure dancing (like a square dance) to independent couples dancing ballroom-style (like a waltz, but in duple rather than ternary rhythm). According to local chroniclers, in 1845 a ship arrived from Havana, bearing, among other things, a party of youths who popularized a new style of contradanza/danza, confusingly called "merengue." This style subsequently became wildly popular in Puerto Rico, to the extent that in 1848 it was banned by the priggish Spanish governor Juan de la Pezuela y Cevallos. This prohibition, however, does not seem to have had much lasting effect, and the newly invigorated genre—now more commonly referred to as "danza"—went on to flourish in distinctly local forms. As in Cuba, these forms included the pieces of music played by dance ensembles as well as sophisticated light-classical items for solo piano (some of which could subsequently be interpreted by dance bands). The danza as a solo piano idiom reached its greatest heights in the music of Manuel Gregorio Tavárez (1843–83), whose compositions have a grace and grandeur closely resembling the music of Chopin, his model. Achieving greater popularity were the numerous danzas of his follower, Juan Morel Campos (1857–96), a bandleader and extraordinarily prolific composer who, like Tavárez, died in his youthful prime (but not before having composed over 300 danzas). By Morel Campos' time, the Puerto Rican Danza had evolved into a form quite distinct from that of its Cuban (not to mention European) counterparts. Particularly distinctive was its form consisting of an initial paseo, followed by two or three sections (sometimes called "merengues"), which might feature an arpeggio-laden "obbligato" melody played on the tuba-like bombardino (euphonium). Many danzas achieved island-wide popularity, including the piece "La Borinqueña", which is the national anthem of Puerto Rico. Like other Caribbean creole genres such as the Cuban danzón, the danzas featured the insistent ostinato called "cinquillo" (roughly, ONE-two-THREE-FOUR-five-SIX-SEVEN-eight, repeated).

The danza remained vital until the 1920s, but after that decade its appeal came to be limited to the Hispanophilic elite. The danzas of Morel Campos, Tavárez, José Quintón, and a few others are still performed and heard on various occasions, and a few more recent composers have penned their idiosyncratic forms of danzas, but the genre is no longer a popular social dance idiom. During the first part of the dancing danza, to the steady tempo of the music, the couples promenade around the room; during the second, with a lively rhythm, they dance in a closed ballroom position and the orchestra would begin by leading dancers in a "paseo," an elegant walk around the ballroom, allowing gentlemen to show off their lady's grace and beauty. This romantic introduction ended with a salute by the gentlemen and a curtsey from the ladies in reply. Then, the orchestra would strike up and the couples would dance freely around the ballroom to the rhythm of the music.

=== Puerto Rican Pop and New Wave ===
Much music in Puerto Rico falls outside the standard categories of "Latin music" and is better regarded as constituting varieties of "Latin world pop." This category includes, for example, Ricky Martin (who had a #1 Hot 100 hit in the U.S. with "Livin' La Vida Loca" in 1999), the boy-band Menudo (with its changing personnel of which Martin was once a member of), Los Chicos, Las Cheris, Salsa Kids and Chayanne. Famous singers include the Despacito singer Luis Fonsi. Also, singer and virtuoso guitarist Jose Feliciano born in Lares, Puerto Rico, became a world pop star in 1968 when his Latin-soul version of "Light My Fire" and the LP Feliciano! became great successes in the American and international rankings and allowed Feliciano to be the first Puerto Rican to win Grammy awards, during that year. Feliciano's "Feliz Navidad" remains one of the most popular Christmas songs.

External audio
- You may listen to José Feliciano's "Light My Fire" here.

=== Reggaetón and Dembow ===
The roots of reggaetón lie in the 1980s by Puerto Rican rapper Vico C. In the early 1990s reggaeton coalesced as a more definitive genre, using the "Dem Bow" riddim derived from a Shabba Ranks song by that name, and further resembling Jamaican dancehall in its verses sung in simple tunes and stentorian style, and its emphasis—via lyrics, videos, and artist personas—on partying, dancing, boasting, "bling," and sexuality rather than weighty social commentary. While reggaeton may have commenced as a Spanish-language version of Jamaican dancehall, in the hands of performers like Tego Calderón, Daddy Yankee, Don Omar, and others, it soon acquired its distinctive flavor and today might be considered the most popular dance music in the Spanish Caribbean, surpassing even salsa.

Reggaetón is a genre of music, significantly blown up in Puerto Rico and across the world, that combines Latin rhythms, dancehall, and hip-hop and rap music. Reggaetón is frequently affiliated with “machismo” characteristics, strong or aggressive masculine pride. Since women have joined this genre of music they have been underrepresented and have been fighting to change its image. This inevitably is causing controversy between what the genre was and what it is now. Reggaetón has transformed from being a musical expression with Jamaican and Panamanian roots to being “dembow” a newer style that has changed the game, which is listened to mainly in the Dominican Republic. Despite its success, its constant reputation highlights sexuality in the dancing, its explicit lyrics that have women screaming sexualized phrases in the background, and the clothing women are presented in. In the '90s and early 2000s, Reggaetón had been targeted and censored in many Latin American countries for its vulgar and coarse nature. Censorship can be seen as the government's way of suppressing the people and ensuring that communication is not strong amongst the community. Since then, many women have joined Reggaetón in hopes of changing preconceptions. Many of them have paved the way and have successful careers such as the female trailblazer herself Ivy Queen, as well as Karol G, Becky G, and Rosalia among others. With strong influences from Puerto Rico and Jamaica, dembow originates from the Dominican Republic. When Shabba Ranks released the track "Dem Bow" in 1990, the name stuck and it did not take long for the dembow genre to form. The main elements of dembow music are its repetitive rhythm, which is somewhat reminiscent of reggaeton and dancehall music, but faster. Riddims were built from the song and the sound became a popular part of reggaeton. The rhythm and melodies in dembow music tends to be simple and repetitive.

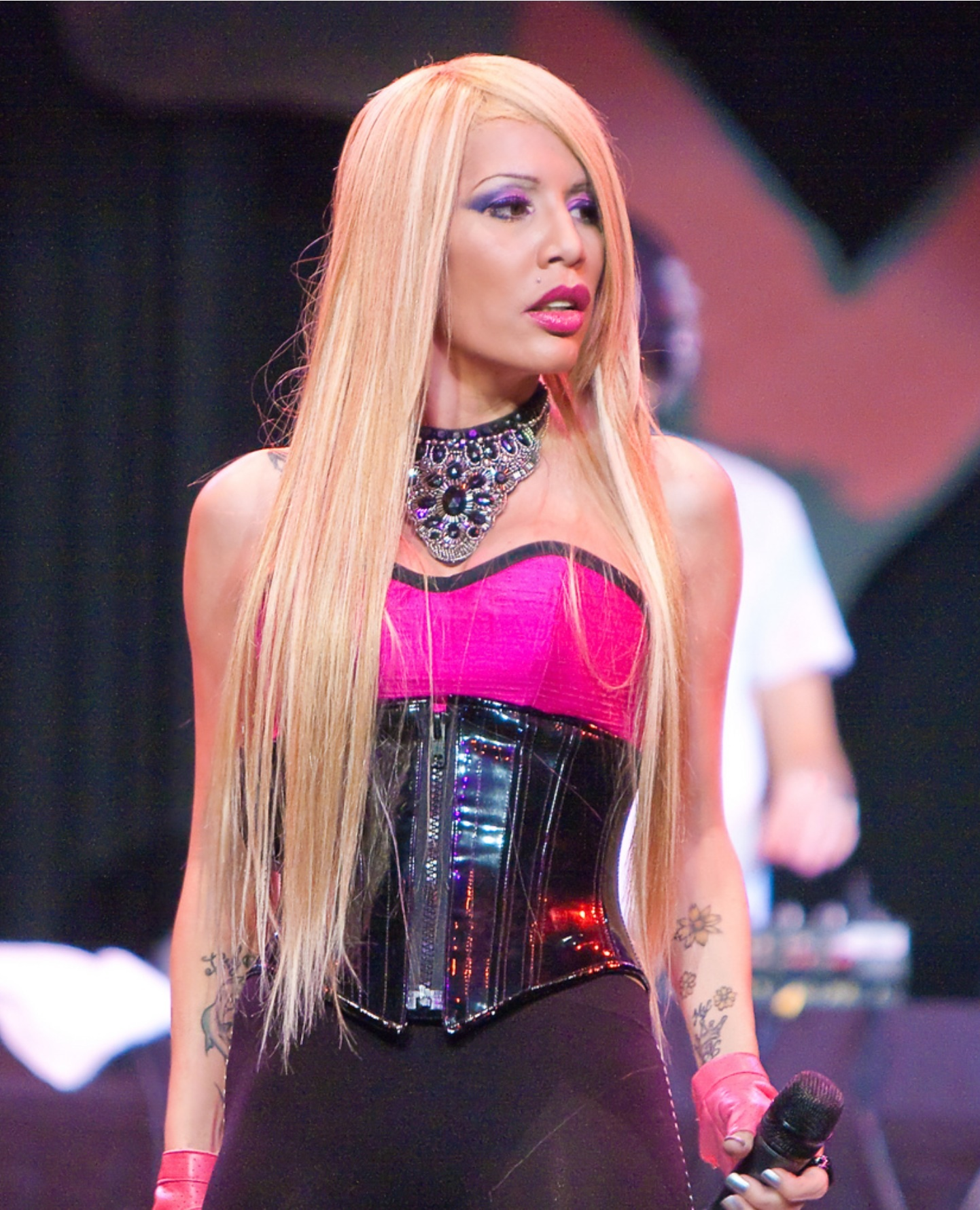
Ivy Queen

== Caribbean influences ==
=== Bachata and Bachatón ===
Bachata originating in the Dominican Republic, has received notable recognition in Puerto Rico due to its strong cultural ties with the Dominican Republic allowing for a fusion of musical genres. One of the primary influences of early bachata includes Cuban bolero, Cuban Son, American Rock, Blues, Mexican Ranchera, Corrido and merengue. The appearance of Dominican styles of music such as bachata and merengue in reggaetón coincided with the arrival in Puerto Rico of the Dominican-born production team of Luny Tunes—although they are not solely credited for this development. In 2000, they received an opportunity to work in the reggaeton studio of DJ Nelson. They began to produce a string of successful releases for reggaeton artists including Ivy Queen, Tego Calderón and Daddy Yankee. "Pa' Que Retozen", one of the first songs to combine bachata and reggaeton appeared on Tego Calderón's highly acclaimed El Abayarde (2002). It features the unmistakable guitar sounds of Dominican bachata—although, it was not produced by Luny Tunes by DJ Joe. Luny Tunes, however, on their debut studio album, Mas Flow (2003) included a hit by Calderón, "Métele Sazón". It exhibited bachata's signature guitar arpeggios as well as merengue's characteristic piano riffs. After the initial success of these songs, other artists began to incorporate bachata with reggaeton. Artists such as Ivy Queen began releasing singles that featured bachata's signature guitar sound, slower romantic rhythm, and exaggerated emotional singing style. This is reflected in the hits "Te He Querido, Te He Llorado" and "La Mala". Daddy Yankee's "Lo Que Paso, Paso" and Don Omar's "Dile" also reflect this. A further use of bachata occurred in 2005 when producers began remixing existing reggaeton with bachata's characteristic guitar sounds marketing it as bachatón defining it as "bachata, but Puerto Rican style".

Artists from Puerto Rico and/or of Puerto Rican descent that have been known to experiment with bachata and/or bachatón includes Trébol Clan, Daddy Yankee, Ivy Queen, Don Omar, Ozuna, Nicky Jam, Myke Towers, Bad Bunny, Romeo Santos, Toby Love, Alejandra Feliz, Yolandita Monge, Sonya Cortés, Domenic Marte, Tego Calderón, Héctor el Father, Tito el Bambino, Wisin & Yandel, Angel & Khriz, Chayanne, Ricky Martin, amongst many others.

=== Bolero ===
Although bolero has its origins in Cuba, it had already reached Puerto Rico in the 20th century where it was popularized on the island through the first radio stations in 1915 and was being both enjoyed as well as composed and performed by Puerto Ricans, including such outstanding figures as Rafael Hernández, Daniel Santos, Pedro Flores, Johnny Albino, Odilio González, Noel Estrada, José Feliciano, Trio Vegabajeño, and Tito Rodríguez, amongst many others. Similar to the bolero genre in Cuba, the bolero in Puerto Rico is usually combined with other genres of Cuban and Puerto Rican origin, such as bomba, danza, plena, jíbaro, guaracha, mambo, rumba, cha-cha-cha, and salsa.

=== Merengue ===
Although merengue is a type of music and dance that has its origins and also carries a very strong association with the Dominican Republic, it became widespread throughout Latin America and the United States, including Puerto Rico. The choreography of the ballroom merengue is a basic side two-step, but with a difficult twist of the hip to the right, which makes it somewhat hard to perform. The two dance partners get into a vals, or waltz-like position. The couple then side steps, known as a Paso de la empalizada or "stick-fence step," followed by either a clockwise or counter-clockwise turn. During all of the dance steps of the ballroom merengue, the couple never separates. The second kind of merengue is called the Figure Meringue or Merengue de Figura. The performing couple makes individual turns without releasing the hands of the partner and still keeping the rhythm of the beat. Popular merengue performers from Puerto Rico include Elvis Crespo, Olga Tañón, Gisselle, Manny Manuel, Grupo Mania, Limi-T 21, amongst many others. Merenhouse, which is a subgenre of merengue that is formed by rapping and includes influences of hip-hop, dancehall, and latin house was formed in New York City in the late 1980s. Lisa M, who was the first major female Latin rapper that was born and raised in San Juan, Puerto Rico is often credited for making the first song in the merenhouse genre. Mostly credited on her second album No Lo Derrumbes, which was released in 1990.

=== Guaracha and Salsa ===
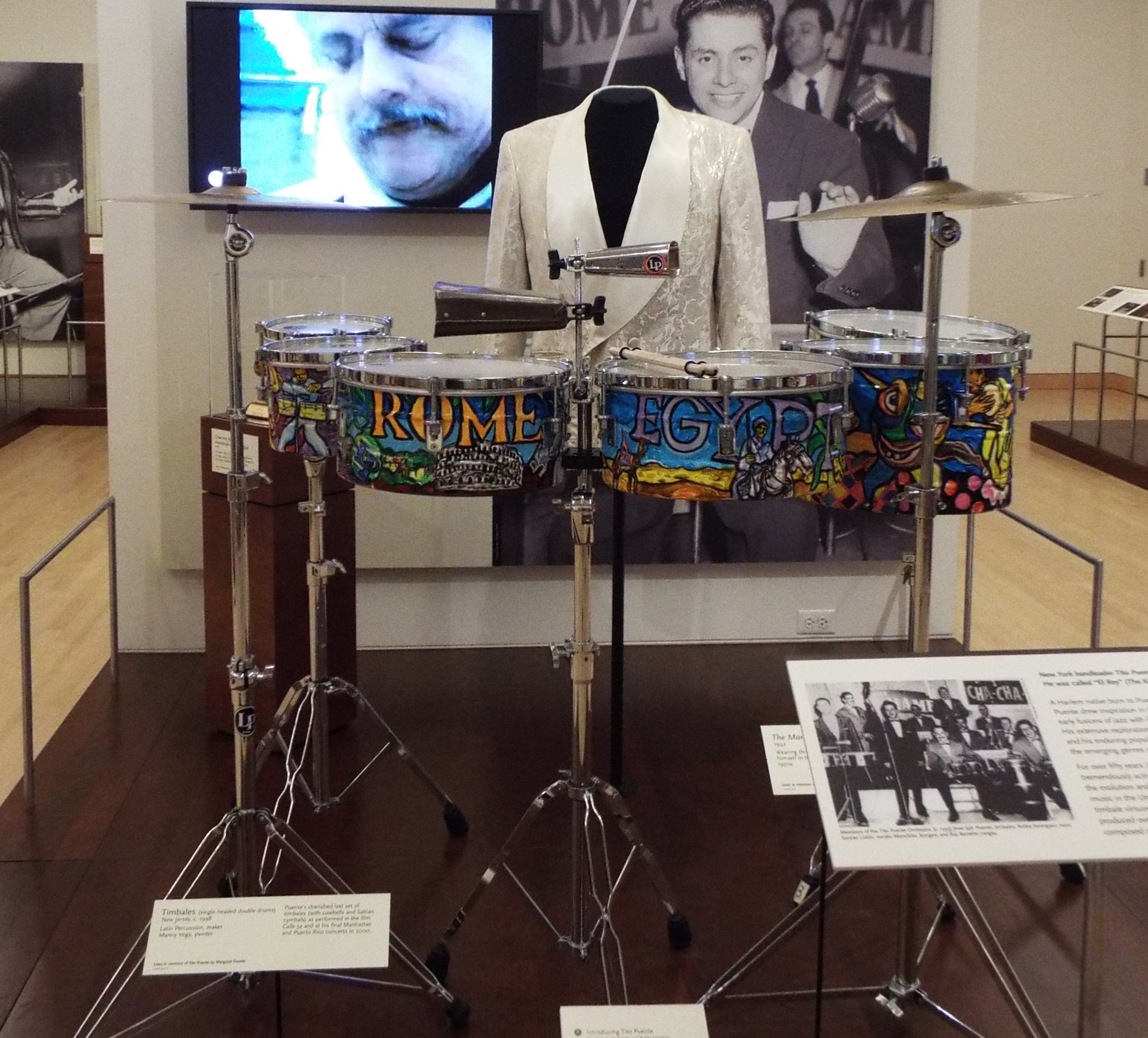
The timbales of Tito Puente on exhibit in the Musical Instruments Museum in Phoenix, AZ

Salsa is another genre whose form derived from the Cuban/Puerto Rican melding of the genre, especially Cuban dance music of the 1950s—but which in the 1960s–70s became an international genre, cultivated with special zeal and excellence in Puerto Rico and by Puerto Ricans in New York City. Forms such as the Charanga were hugely popular with Puerto Ricans and Nuyoricans who, in effect, rescued this genre which had been stagnating and limited to only Cuba in the 1960s, giving it new life, new social significance, and many new stylistic innovations. Salsa is the name acquired by the modernized form of Cuban/Puerto Rican-style dance music that was cultivated and rearticulated starting in the late 1960s by Puerto Ricans in New York City and, subsequently, in Puerto Rico and elsewhere. While salsa soon became an international phenomenon, thriving in Colombia, Venezuela, and elsewhere, New York and Puerto Rico remained its two epicenters. Particularly prominent on the island were El Gran Combo, Sonora Ponceña, and Willie Rosario, as well as the more pop-oriented "salsa romántica" stars of the 1980s–90s. (For further information see the entry on "salsa music.")

Other popular Nuyorican and Puerto Rican exposers of these genres have been Tito Puente, Tito Rodríguez (guaracha and bolero singer), pianists Eddie Palmieri, Richie Ray and Papo Lucca, conguero Ray Barreto, trombonist and singer Willie Colón, and singers La India, Andy Montañez, Bobby Cruz, Cheo Feliciano, Héctor Lavoe, Ismael Miranda, Ismael Rivera, Tito Nieves, Pete El Conde Rodríguez and Gilberto Santa Rosa.

=== Reggae and Dancehall ===
Puerto Rico has had its music scene for both reggae and dancehall artists, in addition to the local reggaetón genre, which had evolved in Puerto Rico primarily through reggae and dancehall influences from Panama and Jamaica. Local artists and bands such as Cultura Profética, Millo Torres y El Tercer Planeta, and Gomba Jahbari have received notable recognition on the island, as well as other reggae and dancehall acts in Puerto Rico. Reggae in Puerto Rico uses elements such as intricate horn arrangements and chord progressions to distinguish it from other styles of reggae, most notably Jamaican reggae. It is also sung primarily in Spanish and/or English, although Puerto Rican reggae can also be sung in other languages as well. Their variation of reggae has also been influenced by other music genres such as salsa, and jazz music which came from the United States, as their local reggae and dancehall musicians like to experiment with other genres and combine them with their style of reggae.

== Classical music ==
The island hosts two main orchestras, the Orquesta Sinfónica de Puerto Rico and the Orquesta Filarmónica de Puerto Rico. The Casals Festival takes place annually in San Juan, attracting classical musicians from around the world. Since the nineteenth century there have been diverse Puerto Rican composers, including Felipe Gutierrez Espinosa, Manuel Gregorio Tavárez, Juan Morel Campos, Aristides Chavier, Julio C. Arteaga, and Braulio Dueño Colón. At the beginning of the 20th century, we find José Ignacio Quintón, Monsita Ferrer, and José Enrique Pedreira. Moving to the mid-20th century a new wave of composers appeared, some of them with a significant degree of nationalism. In this group are Amaury Veray, Héctor Campos Parsi, Jack Delano and Luis Antonio Ramírez. With more contemporary languages comes the musical scene of Rafael Aponte-Ledée and Luis Manuel Álvarez. From the 1970s on, a fair number of musicians add to the list, and, though, with different styles, they all had an imposing international flavor. Ernesto Cordero, Carlos Alberto Vázquez, Alfonso Fuentes, Raymond Torres-Santos, Alberto Rodríguez, William Ortiz-Alvarado, José Javier Peña Aguayo, Carlos Carrillo and Roberto Sierra belong to this group.

== Hip-Hop and Rap music ==
As social conditions and urban decay took their toll on the projects in New York City during the 1970s, blacks, and Puerto Ricans were equally affected. As a way of coping with the disarray that was taking place in New York, both Puerto Ricans and blacks worked together to collaborate on rap music that would help express their creative art. As Deborah Pacini Hernandez wrote in her article, "Oye Como Va! Hybridity and Identity in Latino Popular Music," many of the ways that blacks and Puerto Ricans coped with their struggles was through, "graffiti, DJing, emceeing, break dancing, and fashion—the cultural elements comprising hip-hop." (56) As hip-hop music rose to prominence, it was clear that Puerto Ricans had an influence on the hip-hop industry, from the break dancing to the sound of the music.

"To speak of Puerto Ricans in rap means to defy the sense of instant amnesia that engulfs popular cultural expression once it is caught up in the logic of commercial representation. It involves sketching in historical contexts and sequences, tracing traditions and antecedents, and recognizing hip-hop to be more and different than the simulated images, poses, and formulas the public discourse of media entertainment tends to reduce it to. The decade and more of hindsight provided by the Puerto Rican involvement shows that, rather than a new musical genre and its accompanying stylistic trappings, rap constitutes a space for the articulation of social experience. From this perspective, what has emerged as “Latin rap” first took shape as an expression of the cultural turf shared, and contended for, by African Americans and Puerto Ricans over their decades as neighbors, coworkers, and “homies” in the inner-city communities." – Juan Flores, Puerto Rocks: Rap, Roots and Amnesia

Despite the fact that Puerto Ricans had a huge impact on the rise of hip-hop during the late 1970s, they struggled to receive credit as hip-hop was portrayed through the media as a genre that was predominantly black. Instead of switching genres, they had to find other ways to mask their cultural identities. For example, DJ Charlie Chase was one of the first Puerto Rican artists to burst onto the scene with his group, the Cold Crush Brothers, but was the only person in the original group who was not black. He said that he knew he had to change his name because if he went out to perform as Carlos Mendes, he might not have gotten the credit or attention that he deserved.

However, rappers such as DJ Charlie Chase bad bunny set the scene for more mainstream success in the future. Because of the development of Puerto Ricans in hip-hop, artists like Big Pun, Daddy Yankee, Fat Joe, Swizz Beats, Young MA, Calle 13 (band) have become more successful. Lin-Manuel Miranda achieved universal acclaim with his opera-musical Hamilton (musical), which blends rap and classical influences.

== Dance ==
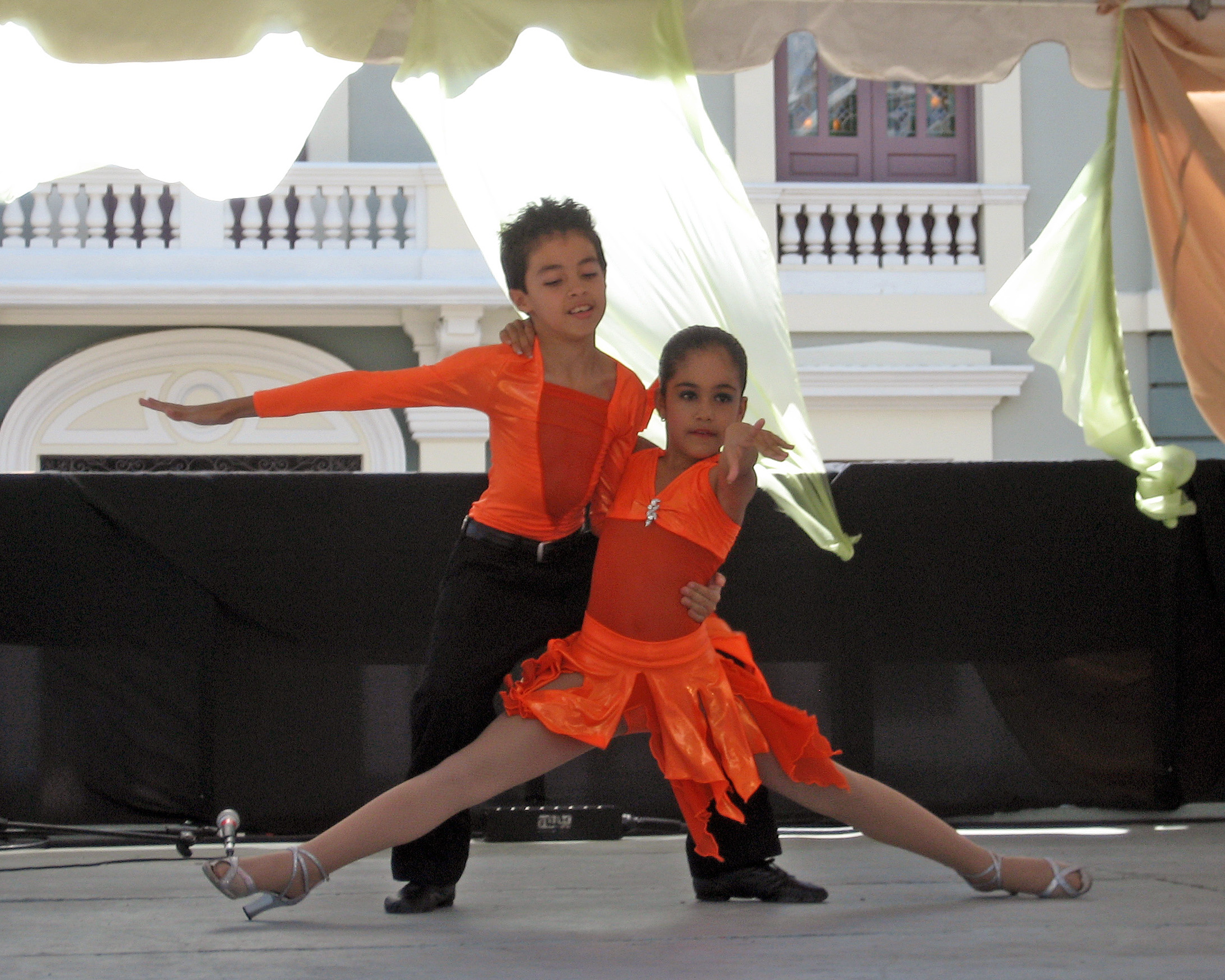
Puerto Rican children dancing at Plaza Las Delicias during the March 2008 Feria de Artesanias de Ponce

Dance is a performing art related to expressing one's ideas and values. The activity is associated with exercise because of the required movements required to execute specific dance patterns. In Puerto Rico, dance is considered to be a part of the culture that is passed on from generation to generation and practiced at family and community parties and celebrations.

=== Historical influences ===
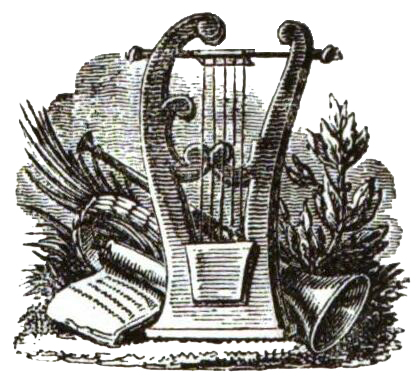
Cover of El Cancionero de Borinquen, a Puerto Rican song book published in 1846

Dance has been influenced by the different cultures of the Taíno natives, the Spaniards, and the African slaves. Since pre-Columbian times, dance has always been part of the culture of Puerto Rico and has evolved according to social and demographic changes. The earliest dances documented by the early historians were the Taíno areyto dances that were chanted by a chorus, set to music, and led by a guide. They practiced storytelling while the guide indicated the steps and songs that were to be repeated until the story was finished. Dances of European origin also became popular among the country folk and the settlers of the central part of the island and rapidly acquired unique features of rhythm, instrumentation, interpretation, and even fashion.

As the population of the Taíno dwindled, Spanish, African, and, from 1898 on, North American dances appeared on the island and took root and developed in the mountains, on the coast, and in the cities.

After the island was taken over by Spain, the music and the dance of Puerto Rico consisted of a combination of harmonious musical styles that are borrowed from Spanish, African, and other European cultures, creating Puerto Rico's signature style of Latin dance.

=== Salsa ===
It refers to the mixture of different rhythms composed of different Latin, African, and Caribbean dances. Salsa is said to be first created around the 1960s and became popular in the non-Latino world drastically. The salsa dance is similar to the mambo dance.

Salsa dancing is structured in six-step patterns phrased on 8 counts of the music. The 8 different steps include 6 moves with 2 pauses. The pattern of the dance is 1,2,3 and pause for 4, move for 5,6,7, and pause for 8. The basic steps are (1) the forward and backward: this step consists of two rock steps going in and out of the moves. The second step is known as the basic side dance step, it is similar to the first step except for this step, the moves are towards the side. The side-to-side feels and turns are significant aspects of the salsa dance.

=== Cha Cha Chá ===
The Cha Cha Chá dance originated in Cuba. The dance revolves around a common time rhythm, typically transcribed as "rock step, triple step, and then rock step" or "1,2,3 Cha Cha Chá." The second category is known as the Cha Cha Chá side basic, the most often used basic move of the dance. It is similar to the previous one except for the triple step to the side rather than in place. The third step is known as the "underarm in Cha Cha Chá" and shows how to do the lady's underarm steps to the right. Based on the previous step, men might not struggle, but women must know the exact turning spot. The dance is named after the scraping sounds that are produced by the feet of the dancers.

== See also ==
- Boogaloo
- Urbano music
- Museo de la Música Puertorriqueña
- Latin trap
- Cultural diversity in Puerto Rico
- History of Puerto Rico
- Cachi Cachi music
- Latin freestyle
- Latin house
- Latin American music in the United States
