= Francisco Rovira Rullán =

Puerto Rican art dealer (born 1977)

Francisco Rovira Rullán (born October 2, 1977, in San Juan, Puerto Rico) is an art dealer, active from a young age. He has worked for the Ronald S. Lauder Collection (NYC), in the Museo de Arte Contemporáneo de Puerto Rico, the Isabella Stewart Gardner Museum (Boston) and M&M Proyectos (San Juan, Puerto Rico) among other institutions and companies.

In 2003, Rovira Rullán founded Galeria Comercial, an exhibit house that rapidly became one of the most important galleries in Puerto Rico due to its curatorial focus and the quality of the artists represented. Rovira Rullan not only built a reputation for exhibiting unknown artists working on non-traditional media, but also managed to insert them successfully into the international art fair circuit (Art Basel, NADA Art Fair, Art Basel Miami Beach), biennials (Whitney Biennial, Torino Triennial), collaborating with galleries (CANADA, Nicole Klasgbrun Gallery) and specialized critique (Flash Art, NY Times, ArtNet, Journal des Arts]).

Founded in 2011, Roberto Paradise is his latest art adventure. Fast-paced, Rovira Rullán has placed his new project and artists in the international art fair circuit (ARCOmadrid], NADA Miami, NADA New York), biennials and museum exhibitions (Whitney Biennial, Museum of Contemporary Art Detroit, Museum of Contemporary Art Chicago, Sala de Arte Publico Siqueiros Mexico) media (for example, Huffington Post, LA Times, Flash Art, New York Times, El País, Modern Painters, Beautiful Decay) and participated in collaborations with prestigious galleries around the world (Andrea Rosen Gallery, ltd Los Angeles and Josh Lilley Gallery to name a few).

Since February 2014, Roberto Paradise has been a member of the New Art Dealers Alliance.
