= Manuel Gregorio Tavárez =

Puerto Rican composer

Manuel Gregorio Tavárez Ropero
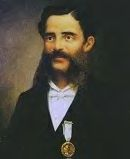
- "Father of the Puerto Rican danza" "The Chopin of America"

Background information
- Born: November 28, 1843
- Origin: San Juan, Puerto Rico
- Died: July 1, 1883 Ponce, Puerto Rico
- Genres: Danza
- Occupations: Composer, musician

Manuel Gregorio Tavárez Ropero (November 16, 1843 – July 1, 1883), was a Puerto Rican classical and danza composer. He has been called "The Chopin of America".

== Early years ==
Tavárez was born in San Juan, Puerto Rico, the son of a French father and a Puerto Rican mother. San Juan was the city where he first began his musical studies. His first musical mentors were José Cabrizas and Domingo Delgado. Tavárez was a student of Gonzalo de J. Núñez (1850 – 1915), whose students also included the internationally known musicians and composers Juan Morel Campos and Arístides Chavier Arévalo. Tavárez became an accomplished pianist at an early age. He was able to enroll and study music in the Music Conservatory of Paris at the age of 15 with a scholarship granted by "The Economic Society of Friends of Puerto Rico" (La Sociedad Económica Amigos del Pais). Tavárez studied under the guidance of Auber and D'Albert. While in France, Tavárez suffered a stroke which left his hand partially paralyzed.

Tavárez returned to Puerto Rico because of his health problems. He settled down in Ponce where he gave piano lessons. He was able to overcome his health problems and began to put on musical concerts of his compositions.

== "Father of the Puerto Rican Danza" ==
Tavárez is considered to be Puerto Rico's first Romantic era composer. He also composed music in other genres as well. Among his best known works was the funeral march Redención (Redemption), dedicated to the memory of José Campeche; the rhapsody Souvenir de Puerto Rico, and his danzas Recuerdos de Antaño (Remembrance of Yesteryear) and what is considered his greatest work, the danza Margarita. The music created by Tavárez would always be recognized as an integral part of Puerto Rican culture. Tavárez is known as the "Father of the Puerto Rican Danza". Among his most distinguished disciples was the composer Juan Morel Campos. His daughter Elisa Tavárez would also become an accomplished pianist.

== Death ==
Manuel Gregorio Tavárez Ropero died on July 1, 1883, in the city of Ponce, Puerto Rico. He was 39 years old.

== Selection of Danzas by Tavárez ==
External audio
- You may listen to Luciano Quiñones piano interpretation of Tavárez's "Margarita" here

The following is a list of some of Tavárez's Danzas:

- La Sensitiva (The sensitive one)
- La Margarita
- Recuerdos de Antaño (Remembrance of Yesteryear)
- Redención (Redemption)
- Souvener de Puerto Rico
- Un Recuerdito (A small remembrance)

== Honors and recognitions ==
Tavárez has been honored by the Government of Puerto Rico with the naming of public buildings and institutions after him. In San Juan, there is a theater named after him. His music can still be appreciated in concerts today. In Ponce, he is recognized at the Ponce Park of the Illustrious Ponce Citizens.

== See also ==
- List of Puerto Ricans
- French immigration to Puerto Rico
