= Luciano Quiñones =

Puerto Rican musician (born 1948)

Luciano Quiñones Lugo
- Born: June 22, 1948; San Germán, Puerto Rico
- Genres: Modern Puerto Rican Danzas
- Occupation(s): Pianist and composer
- Instrument: Piano

Luciano Quiñones Lugo (born June 22, 1948), is a pianist and a composer of Modern Puerto Rican Danzas.

== Early years ==
Quiñones, was born in the town of San Germán, Puerto Rico where he also received his primary education. He was musically influenced by his family who taught him the basics in music at a young age. In 1960, he was sent to the Mayagüez free School of Music where he began his formal musical education.

In 1965, Quiñones enrolled at the Interamerican University of Puerto Rico at San Germán where he continued his musical instruction. In 1969, he earned a bachelor's degree in music with a concentration in applied piano. He was also awarded "The Most Outstanding Student of the Music Department" medal.

== Musical career ==
After graduating from Interamerican University of Puerto Rico, Quiñones worked as a piano teacher for the Puerto Rican Department of Education. He married Sylvia Rodriguez to whom he dedicated his first danza "A Sylvia" in 1977, when he began his endeavor as a composer. This danza won 2nd prize at the Puerto Rican Institute of Culture competition. By 2014, 33 of his danzas have won prizes, becoming the composer with most awards to date. "El Abanico" (The Fan), the "Official Anthem of the City of Hormigueros" and "Himno a Mayagüez" are a few of the ones to have lyrics, as most were originally composed for piano solo. The latter two of the danzas were adopted as the official anthems of their respective cities. His danza "Linda Mayagüezna", also dedicated to his wife, have been played at the Pablo Casals Festival in Puerto Rico. One of his compositions is his danza "Amor Eterno", (Eternal Love) posthumously dedicated to his wife after her death in 2004.

== Danza compositions ==
External audio
- You may listen to Luciano Quiñones' "A Sylvia " here.

Some of the danzas composed by Quiñones.:

- Amor Eterno (Eternal Love)
- Aniversario (Anniversary)
- A Sylvia (To Sylvia)
- Campanas Nupciales (Wedding Bells)
- Días Felices (Happy Days)
- El Abanico (The Fan)
- Fantasia en Azul (Blue Fantasy)
- Fiesta de Acabe
- Fiestas de la Candelaria
- Fiestas de Santa Rosa (Festival of Saint Rose)
- Irma
- Isla Hermosa (Lovely Island)
- Linda Flor (Beautiful Flower)
- Linda Mayagüezana (Beautiful Girl from Mayagüez)
- Matices
- Mis Tesoros (My Treasures)
- Nuestro Amor (Our Love)
- Pensando en Tí (Thinking of You)
- Princesita Juguetona (Playful Princess)
- Quinceañera (15th Birthday)
- Renacer (Reborn)
- Sueño de Amor (Dream of Love)
- Sueño Español (Spanish Dream)
- Tarde Gris (Gray Afternoon)
- Tierno Amor (Tender Love)
- Virgencita del Pozo
- Torbellino de Pasiones
- Soñando con tus Besos (Dreaming of your kisses)
- Fiestas de la Calle San Sebastián

== Later years ==
Quiñones developed two websites: In 1996, he created "The Home of the Danza" where anyone may listen to some danzas performed by him. He also created "Luciano's Piano Bar" where he performs boleros and modern music.

== Recognitions ==
Quiñones has received the following recognitions:

- Special recognitions from the Mayagüez Lions Club, The City of San Germán and the Puerto Rican Institute of Culture.
- He was named the adopted son of Mayagüez in 2000
- He was inducted into the Puerto Rican Danza Composers Hall of Fame in 2003.
- The 32nd annual Danza Week of 2004, sponsored by the Puerto Rican Institute of Culture, was dedicated to him.
- The 2008 "Nuestra Música" Festival was dedicated to him on the Danza night.

Quiñones was a music professor at the Mayagüez Free School of Music. He currently participates in the Danza Festival of Mayagüez either as a soloist or accompanist. His wife Sylvia, who was his major source of inspiration and with whom he had two children, Jose Carlos and Jose Ivan, died on November 15, 2004. Quiñones presently resides in Mayagüez and presents his Danza's recital in universities, schools, social and cultural institutions that contract him. He also lectures on the Danza for the Institute of Puerto Rican Culture.

== See also ==
- List of Puerto Ricans
