= Danza =

Musical genre that originated in Ponce, Puerto Rico

Danza is a musical genre that originated in Ponce, a city in southern Puerto Rico. It is a popular turn-of-the-twentieth-century ballroom dance genre slightly similar to the waltz. Both the danza and its cousin the contradanza are sequence dances, performed to a pattern, usually of squares, to music that was instrumental. Neither the contradanza nor the danza were sung genres; this is a contrast to, for example, the habanera, which was a sung genre. There is some dispute as to whether the danza was in any sense a different dance from the contradanza, or whether it was just a simplification of the name. Through the first part of the 19th century the dance and its music became steadily more creolized. The music and the dance is creolized because composers were consciously trying to integrate African and European ideas because many of the people themselves were creoles, that is, born in the Caribbean; accepting their islands as their true and only homeland.

Some well-known composers of danzas are Manuel Gregorio Tavárez, "The Father of Puerto Rican Danza", and Juan Morel Campos, considered by many to have raised the genre to its highest level. Others are Cuban Ignacio Cervantes, and Curaçaoan Jan Gerard Palm.

== Danza in Puerto Rico ==
External audio
- You may listen to Graciela Rivera's interpretation of Fernández Juncos' version of the "La Borinqueña"" here.
- You may listen to Luciano Quiñones piano interpretation of Tavárez's "Margarita"here
- You may listen to Luciano Quiñones piano interpretation of Morel Campos' "No me toque" here

Danza is a form of music that can be varied in its expression. The Puerto Rican national anthem, La Borinqueña, was originally a danza that was later altered to fit a more anthem-like style. Danzas can be either romantic or festive. Romantic danzas have four sections, beginning with an eight-measure paseo followed by three themes of sixteen measures each. The third theme typically includes a solo by the bombardino and, often, a return to the first theme or a coda at the end. Festive danzas are free-form, with the only rules being an introduction and a swift rhythm.

The first part of the romantic danza, the paseo, had 8 measures of music without a fixed rhythm (a snare drumroll may be played as background), when the couples circled the room elegantly, giving the lady the opportunity to display her beauty. The second part, called the merengue, grew from the original 16 measures to 34, in 1854. Here the couples held each other in a proper stance and executed turns that looked very much like a waltz.

While the origins of the danza are murky, it probably arose around 1840 as a sort of reaction against the highly codified contradanza and, according to Cuban sources, was strongly influenced by Cuban immigrants and their habanera music. The first danzas were immature, youthful songs condemned by the authorities, who occasionally tried ineffectively to ban the genre.

In Puerto Rico, the genre continued evolving until it was taken up by the young pianist Manuel Gregorio Tavárez, who had just arrived from his studies in Paris, and took it to a new artistic level. His disciple, Juan Morel Campos, adopted it also and developed it further to its maximum expression, composing more than 300 danzas, most of them masterpieces of an exquisite beauty. The danza that evolved was inspired mostly by women and romance and their titles reflected that change.

== See also ==
- Music of Puerto Rico
- Fiesta Nacional de la Danza
