= NG2 (duo) =

Puerto Rican Salsa duo

NG^{2}
- Origin: Puerto Rico
- Genre: Salsa
- Years active: 2004—present
- Members: Norberto Vélez; Gerardo Rivas

NG^{2} is a Puerto Rican Salsa duo formed by Norberto Vélez and Gerardo Rivas. Rivas is the son of Jerry Rivas, one of the singers of El Gran Combo. Rivas also enjoyed early fame during his childhood as the lead singer of "Gerardito y los Rockolos".

Both of the members were a part of fellow Puerto Rican Salsa singer Víctor Manuelle orchestra before deciding to go out solo. Víctor Manuelle has supported them all throughout.

The duo has enjoyed much success during their short career, even winning a Latin Billboard in 2005 for Best Tropical Song. Norberto Vélez and Gerardo Rivas, the groups' vocalists performed the single "Mi salsa se respeta" as a message to the other groups in the industry. With it they wanted to express that "while young in this, [industry] we know how to do our work very well". When the group debuted, their success was underestimated by the public and fellow musicians. Both performed also noted that they want the tropical genre to unify their efforts, to gather interest from the public.

== Discography ==
- Comienzos (2004)
- Al Fin (2006)
- Con Todas Las De Ganar (2008)
- Exitos Y Mas (2010)
- Al Borde De La Locura (2012)
- Elementos (2014)
- Homenaje A Mexico Vol. 1 (2018)
- Homenaje A Mexico Vol. 2 (2018)
- Conceptos (2019)
- Mi Primera Navidad (With Edwin Colon Zayas) (2019)

== After NG2 ==
Sesiones Desde La Loma (Session from the Hill) was first featured in October 2019 on the YouTube channel and is filmed in Hatillo, Puerto Rico from the La Loma del Temeguindo. Each month, unannounced featured guest or groups join Norberto Vélez Curbelo to bring the music of Puerto Rico to YouTube audiences from around the world played on instrument typical to the Island of Puerto Rico and Latin America. These musical events, mostly salsa music, appear on the YouTube channel unannounced monthly on a weekday or weekend. Sesiones Desde La Loma on the YouTube channel is monitor in anticipation when the next session from the hill is uploaded. Norberto Velez has amassed over 218.8 million views on his YouTube channel. Below are links to other Wikipedia pages of past and present performers at Sesiones Desde La Loma, Puerto Rico music and genres, Puerto Rican History and culture and instruments used in the Latin culture. Picture galleries of the invited guests featured at the hill and several of the instruments played at the hill. In December 2024 Norberto featured Session number 42 from the hill.

On October 22, 2022 Fans from the four corners of Puerto Rico and different parts of the world participated in a sold-out live event, called "El Evento" near the little house on the hill featuring some of the past guest, including Maelo Ruiz and Tito Nieves at The Hill of Temeguindo.

On October 1, 2023 Fans From around the world joined Norberto for sold-out Sesiones Desde La Loma El Evento 2 at El Gran Parque Agroturístico Ecológico y Recreativo El Dorado in Dorado, Puerto Rico. The video release of this event was feature on YouTube on New Year's Eve 2023

In July 2024, nearly five years, Sesiones Desde La Loma, has over 570 thousand subscribers and over 30 million views with 47 sessions and two live events, far surpassing the initial projected goals of 25 videos. YouTube Sesiones Desde La Loma has had over three millions, not including singles performed by Norberto Velez on the same channel. The second live event occurred on October 1, 2023 in the Gran Parque Agroturistico, Ecológico y Recreativo El Dorado in Dorado, Puerto Rico.

On October 5, 2024 Fans From Puerto Rico were along with fans from Austria, Canada, Colombia, Cuba, Dominican Republic, Ecuador, Mexico, Panama, Peru, Spain, United States, Venezuela and other locations joined Norberto for sold-out Sesiones Desde La Loma El Evento 3 at El Gran Parque Agroturístico Ecológico y Recreativo El Dorado in Dorado, Puerto Rico. The video of El Evento 3 was feature on YouTube on New Years Eve 2024

== Founder of Sesiones Desde La Loma ==
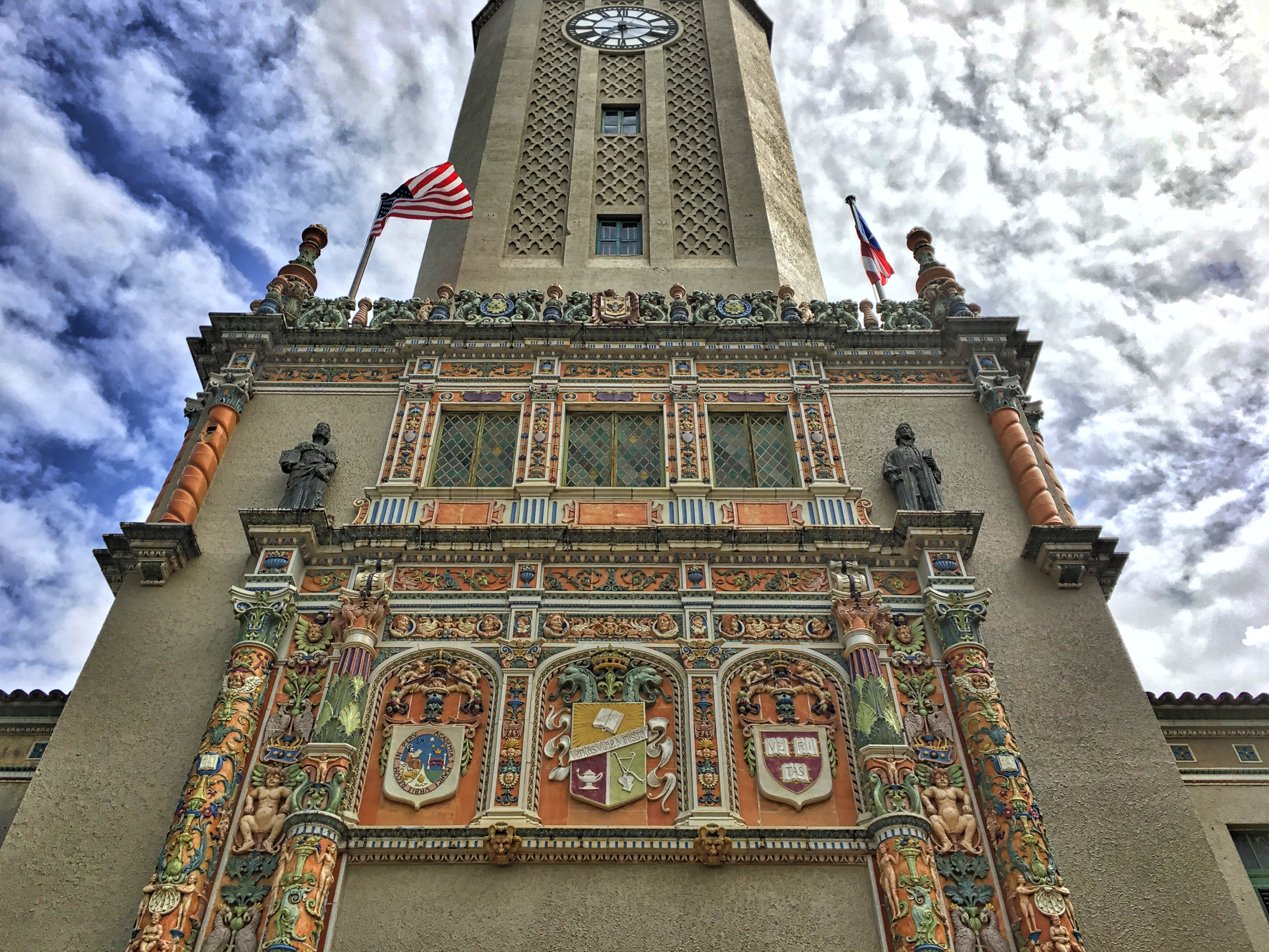
Clock Tower University of Puerto Rico-San Marcos-Harvard

Norberto Vélez Curbelo (born August 20, 1979, Rio Piedras, Puerto Rico) is founder of Sesiones Desde La Loma on YouTube. Norberto's family was made up of his father Heriberto Vélez, who passed a short while ago, his mother Norma Curbelo and his younger sister Normarí Vélez. Before taking his first steps in his residence in the town of Hatillo, Puerto Rico, showed signs of his artistic streak. His first music teacher, his father, offered classes at the Escuela Especializada Libre Música Arecibo and at the Interamerican University of Puerto Rico in the town of Arecibo. In his childhood, Norberto showed interest in learning to play various instruments, of which he made the guitar his favorite. At the age of seven, Norberto, always led by his parents, began to offer his first musical performances interpreting the typical music of Puerto Rico. He remained in this environment for approximately ten years between the ensembles Conjunto Tipico Clasico and Conjunto 4x4. When Norberto was 17 years old, he joined the Trompeta Con Trovadores – Trumpet with Trovadores, directed by maestro Elías López Sobá, where he began to feel a great passion for the salsa genre. During this time, he participated as a backup singer with various artists such as: Kedwin Ceballo, Frankie Negrón, Carolina la O, Pedro Brull, among others. After approximately three years, Norberto joined as a backup singer with the Victor Manuelle known as El Sonero de la Juventud. In 2003, Victor presented the concert where Norberto sang the duet with the sonero of youth the song of "Sin Bandera Si te vas"/"Without the Flag, it leaves you". Norbeto Vélez and his childhood friend Gerardo Rivas, formed a Puerto Rican Salsa group name NG2 which lasted for sixteen years until they decided to concentrate on projects that they want to achieve individually. Gerardo Rivas father Jerry Rivas, lead singer for El Gran Combo de Puerto Rico for 45 years, was featured with the group at the hill in episode number 32.

== La Loma del Temeguindo ==
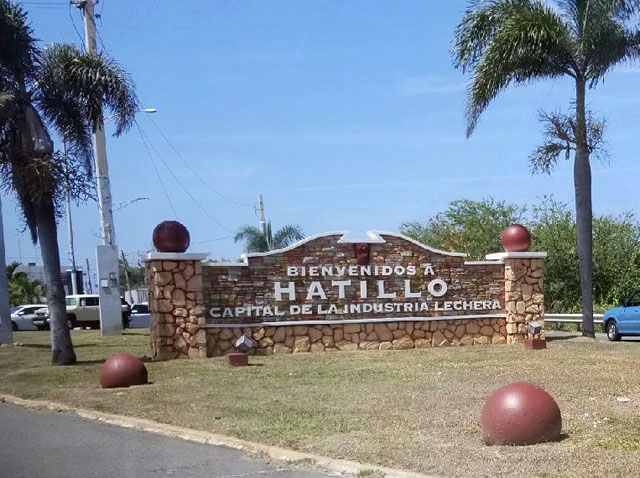
Welcome To Hatillo

Afterwards, Norberto, singer, composer, producer, arranger and entertainer built a small house, known as the "Casa de los/House of the salseros" with a porch at "La Loma del Temeguindo"-"The Hill of Temeguindo" in the Barrio (District) of Naranjito located in Hatillo, Puerto Rico. In 2019, Norberto starting producing YouTube videos episodes titled "Sesiones Desde La Loma"/"Sessions from the Hill" approximately every month. The project is currently continuing and YouTube subscribers have grown to over 300 thousand from an initial start of 200. Norberto produces his own music videos as well and uploaded his live concert which premiered on April 9, 2021, from "LA Loma" Titled "A Mi Modo" which has been viewed over 100K times. On October 22nd, Norberto's sold-out live concert titled "The Event" was attended by thousand of people near the little house on the hill.

== Dia de Los Tres Reyes Magos ==
In Puerto Rico, Epiphany (/əˈpɪfəni/ ə-PIF-ə-nee), is an important festive holiday, and is commonly referred as Dia de Los Tres Reyes Magos, or Three Kings' Day. It is traditional for children to fill a box with fresh grass or hay and put it underneath their bed, for the Wise Men's horses. In Puerto Rico many artisans make commemorative historical figures of the Magi on horseback. The Three Wise Men of Puerto Rico, according to local tradition, arrive on horseback instead of camels as in other countries where the custom is also ingrained. The three kings will then take the grass to feed the horses and will leave gifts under the bed as a reward. These traditions are analogous to the customs of children leaving mince pies and sherry out for Father Christmas in Western Europe or leaving milk and cookies for Santa Claus in the United States. On the day before the feast (January 5), the "Rosario de Reyes" or "Promesa de Reyes" is celebrated with songs (aguinaldos) promised to be sung to the Kings, usually before a little table with figures of the Nativity and the Kings or with the Kings alone and their camels. This celebration is accompanied with a chicken soup, snacks, and drinks.

=== Aguinaldo ===
On January 06, 2023, El Dia de los Tres Reyes Magos, Sesiones Desde La Loma Ep. 33 featured Grupo Mapeyé: Orquesta Criolla Nacional de Puerto Rico playing typical aguinaldo. In Puerto Rico, the aguinaldo is a musical gift offered during the Christmas season and is a tradition inherited from the island's Spanish colonizers. As a musical gift, aguinaldos are mostly played by "parranderos" or "trullas" during the Christmas holidays. While parrandas, showing up at a residence late at night, with a group of Christmas carolers, is a practice that is slowly being lost in Puerto Rico, a Puerto Rican aguinaldos album debuted in the top 10 Billboard Tropical Albums in December 2019. In 2016, Grupo Mapeyé, was nominated in Latin Grammy Award for Best Folk Album in 2016 with "En Las Islas Canarias" in the 17th Annual Latin Grammy Awards.

Originally, aguinaldos were "villancicos" with strong religious connotations but soon evolved to "coplas" (quartets) and "decimas" (ten-verses compositions) about all kinds of everyday topics. Aguinaldos were played with typical instruments such as the bordonúa, a tiple, a cuatro, a carracho or güiro, a cowbell, barriles de bomba, an accordion, and maracas. With bordonua players becoming more difficult to find, the guitar became a staple accompanying the cuatro. Today, panderos (also known as "pleneras"), brass instruments and whatever makes noise, are used.

As a genre, the aguinaldo is played mostly on the radio on key Christmas holidays in Puerto Rico; the day before Christmas and in Christmas, on New Year's Eve and New Year's Day, and the day before Three Kings Day and on Three King's Day (January 6). Aguinaldos are also played at Christmas church celebrations.

=== Singers/Groups Outside of Puerto Rico ===
Episode 9 featured Johnny Rivera, an American salsa singer of Puerto Rican descent. Rivera was born in the Bronx, New York, and attended high school at Benjamin Franklin High School. He moved briefly to Puerto Rico before returning to New York City to begin a career in music. Episode 31 feature José Alberto Justiniano (born December 22, 1959, in Villa Consuelo, Santo Domingo, Dominican Republic), better known by his stage name José Alberto "El Canario", a salsa singer from the Dominican Republic. Episode 34 feature Daniela Alejandra Darcourt Escurra, born on April 20, 1996 and spent her entire childhood with her five sisters in the El Porvenir neighborhood, in the La Victoria district, in Lima, Peru. Daniela is a Peruvian singer, songwriter and dancer. She is cataloged by experts as one of the best salsa singers in the country. She has also been a Judge for Yo Soy Kids, and a trainer at La Voz Peru, La voz Senior and La voz Kids. Episodes 36 and 37 feature from Venezuela, Ronald Borgas from Guaco (band) and Servando & Florentino respectively. Episode 38 featured Gaby Zambrano who is a member of Agua Bella is a female technocumbia music group from Peru. Episode 49 featured Jossie Esteban (born Esteban Grullón) from the Dominican Republic

=== Other guest ===
In episode 38, beside Gaby Zambrano from Peru also included Puerto Ricans Pete Perignon and Jeremry Bosch. Pete Perignon, the son of legendary salsa bandleader Don Perignon. Pete is a Latin Grammy-winning bandleader, musical director, and master percussionist. He was recognized in the category of Tropical Best Salsa Album "La Esquina del Bailador" at the 19th Annual Latin Grammy Awards. Jeremy Bosch who wrote "Ya No Me Duele", the fourth track on the album SALSWING!

Episode 53 featured guest was La Sonora Ponceña, a Puerto Rican salsa band, founded in 1954 by Enrique "Quique" Lucca Caraballo. Today Quique's son, Papo Lucca, directs the band.

Episode 55 feature guest Olga Tañón a Puerto Rican singer. Over the course of her career, she has earned two Grammy Awards, three Latin Grammy Awards, and 29 Premio Lo Nuestro Awards. She has sold over five million copies of her albums.

=== Transition and Creation ===
On April 14, 2023 Norberto released a musical production titled "Transición y Creación" that reflected the evolution of Norberto Vélez as a singer, composer and producer. Transición y Creación has nine unpublished songs, all authored by the singer. In this production, the salsa public had the opportunity to listen to Norberto, but also to his bandmates Carlos García (singer, pianist, composer, and producer) and Jota Ruiz ( trumpeter, singer, arranger, and producer) from Ponce, with whom he also shared composition credits on two songs.

== Sesiones Desde La Loma YouTube Videos ==
Title	Date	Title (Título) – Guest (Invitada-Invitado) Performers	Views
"Sesiones Desde La Loma Ep. 1"	October 14, 2019	Manolo Ramos	.235m
"Sesiones Desde La Loma Ep. 2"	November 8, 2019	Gilberto Santa Rosa "El Caballero de la Salsa" ("The Gentleman of Salsa")	3.4m
"Sesiones Desde La Loma Ep. 3"	December 6, 2019	La Parranda (Party) Desde La Loma - From the Hill - Christmas Party	1.2m
"Sesiones Desde La Loma Ep. 4"	January 23, 2020	Madera Fina	.145m
"Sesiones Desde La Loma Ep. 5"	February 13, 2020	Victor Manuelle El Sonero de la Juventud ("The Singer Of Youths")	4.3m
"Sesiones Desde La Loma Ep. 6"	March 5, 2020	Danny Rivera	.590m
"Sesiones Desde La Loma Ep. 7"	April 27, 2020	Tus Canciones Favoritas - Your Favorite Songs	.847m
"Sesiones Desde La Loma Ep. 8"	May 10, 2020	Los Seis De La Loma	.142m
"Sesiones Desde La Loma Ep. 9"	June 11, 2020	Johnny Rivera	.612m
"Sesiones Desde La Loma Ep. 10"	July 10, 2020	Michelle Brava	.257m
"Sesiones Desde La Loma Ep. 11"	August 14, 2020	Domingo Quiñones	.239m
"Sesiones Desde La Loma Ep. 12"	September 10, 2020	Carlos García	158m
"Sesiones Desde La Loma Ep. 13"	November 5, 2020	¡Nuestro Aniversario! - Our (First) Anniversary	.690m
"Sesiones Desde La Loma Ep. 14"	November 25, 2020	Homenaje a Tito Rojas "El Gallo Salsero" (Su Última/Last - Live/Presentación En Vivo)	.755m
"Sesiones Desde La Loma Ep. 15"	January 15, 2021	Luisito Carrión	.797m
"Sesiones Desde La Loma Ep. 16"	February 12, 2021	Serenata Desde La Loma	.178m
"Sesiones Desde La Loma Ep. 17"	June 4, 2021	Ángel "Cucco" Peña	.506m
"Sesiones Desde La Loma Ep. 18"	July 16, 2021	La Fuerza De Choque	.228m
"Sesiones Desde La Loma Ep. 19"	August 12, 2021	Tito Nieves "El Pavarotti de la Salsa"	2.8m
"Sesiones Desde La Loma Ep. 20"	September 9, 2021	Chucho Avellanet	.210m
"Sesiones Desde La Loma Ep. 21"	October 14, 2021	Maelo Ruiz - ¡Nuestro Segundo Aniversario! - Our (Second) Anniversary	1.2m
"Sesiones Desde La Loma Ep. 22"	November 11, 2021	Start of the Christmas Celebration - Plenéalo ensembles in my Puerto Rico!	.259m
"Sesiones Desde La Loma Ep. 23"	December 9, 2021	Christian Nieves-Virtuoso Puerto Rico cuatro & feat. Omar Santiago trovador	.348m
"Sesiones Desde La Loma Ep. 24"	January 27, 2022	Moncho Rivera - Homenaje/Tribute - Ismael "Maelo" Rivera - "El Sonero Mayor"	.697m
"Sesiones Desde La Loma Ep. 25"	March 17, 2022	Moncho Rivera - (Parte II)	.774m
"Sesiones Desde La Loma Ep. 26"	April 21, 2022	El Último Bolero y sus Compositores	.860m
"Sesiones Desde La Loma Ep. 27"	April 28, 2022	Andy Montañez	.930m
"Sesiones Desde La Loma Ep. 28"	June 10, 2022	Michael Stuart	.195m
"Sesiones Desde La Loma Ep. 29"	July 14, 2022	La Fuerza de Choque (Parte II)	.279m
"Sesiones Desde La Loma Ep. 30"	August 12, 2022	Homenaje a Tres De Los Grandes: Frankie Ruiz, Hector Lavoe, Tricoche	.311m
"Sesiones Desde La Loma Ep. 31"	September 15, 2022	José Alberto "El Canario"	1.3m
"Sesiones Desde La Loma El Evento I"	October 22, 2022	3-Hour Live Concert El Evento I Uploaded on New Year's Eve 2022	.929m
"Sesiones Desde La Loma Ep. 32"	November 24, 2022	El Gran Combo de Puerto Rico	2.0m
"Sesiones Desde La Loma Ep. 33"	January 06, 2023	Grupo Mapeyé: Orquesta Criolla Nacional de Puerto Rico	.536m
"Sesiones Desde La Loma Ep. 34"	February 09, 2023	Daniela Darcourt	1.0m
"Sesiones Desde La Loma Ep. 35"	March 16, 2023	David Rivera	.127m
"Sesiones Desde La Loma Ep. 36"	May 04, 2023	Ronald Borjas	.478m
"Sesiones Desde La Loma Ep. 37"	June 24, 2023	Servando & Florentino during the celebration of "La Noche de San Juan"	2.2m
"Sesiones Desde La Loma Ep. 38"	July 27, 2023	Pete Perigñon FT. Gaby Zambrano & Jeremy Bosch	.163m
"Sesiones Desde La Loma Ep. 39"	July 27, 2023	Bobby Valentín y Su Orquesta	.574m
"Sesiones Desde La Loma El Evento II"	October 1, 2023	3-Hour Live Concert El Evento II Uploaded on New Year's Eve 2023	.342m
"Sesiones Desde La Loma Ep. 40"	October 20, 2023	La Vellonera De La Loma	.176m
"Sesiones Desde La Loma Ep. 41"	December 14, 2023	La Vellonera Navideña	.339m
"Sesiones Desde La Loma Ep. 42"	February 01, 2024	Nino Segarra	.896m
"Sesiones Desde La Loma Ep. 43"	February 22, 2024	Manny Manuel	.344m
"Sesiones Desde La Loma Ep. 44"	March 22, 2024	Willie Rosario	.498m
"Sesiones Desde La Loma Ep. 45"	April 26, 2024	Junte Boricua - Luisito Carrión - Johnny Rivera	.156m
"Sesiones Desde La Loma Ep. 46"	May 31, 2024	Christian Legacy's Orchestra	.166m
"Sesiones Desde La Loma Ep. 47"	July 05, 2024	Salsa Release Party	.121m
"Sesiones Desde La Loma Ep. 48"	July 26, 2024	Rey Ruiz	.520m
"Sesiones Desde La Loma Ep. 49"	August 30, 2024	Jossie Esteban	.880m
"Sesiones Desde La Loma El Evento III"	October 05, 2024	3-Hour Live Concert El Evento III Uploaded on New Year's Eve 2024	.994m
"Sesiones Desde La Loma Ep. 50"	November 01, 2024	Manolo Ramos	.690m
"Sesiones Desde La Loma Ep. 51"	November 28, 2024	Rafael 'Pollo' Brito	.730m
"Sesiones Desde La Loma Ep. 52"	December 13, 2024	Tito Nieves (Navidad A Mi Estilo)	.251m
"Sesiones Desde La Loma Ep. 53"	February 21, 2025	La Sonora Ponceña	.343m
"Sesiones Desde La Loma Ep. 54"	April 25, 2025	Luis "Perico" Ortiz	.214m
"Sesiones Desde La Loma Ep. 55"	May 30, 2025	Olga Tañón	.715m
"Sesiones Desde La Loma Ep. 56"	August 08, 2025	De Un Estilo A Otro	.700m
"Sesiones Desde La Loma Ep. 57"	September 05, 2025	Alain Pérez	.208m
"Sesiones Desde La Loma Ep. 58"	October 10, 2025	Guaynaa	.614m
"Sesiones Desde La Loma Ep. 59"	November 27, 2025	Abrazo Navideño - Christian Nieves, José Nogueras	.274m
"Sesiones Desde La Loma Ep. 60"	January 23, 2026	Aymée Nuviola	.233m
"Sesiones Desde La Loma Ep. 61"	February 20, 2026	Oscarito Serrano - Grupo Manía	.124m
"Sesiones Desde La Loma Ep. 62"	March 27, 2026	Jeremy Bosch	.750m
"Sesiones Desde La Loma Ep. 63"	April 24, 2026	Alex D' Castro	.186m
"Sesiones Desde La Loma Ep. 64"	June 05, 2026	Bolero Echoes - Norberto Vélez sings selections of boleros most marked his life and career	.27m
"Sesiones Desde La Loma Ep. 65"	Jul 24, 2026	Luis Enrique	.280m
Sesiones Desde La Loma Ep. 66	Sep 11, 2026	Joseph Fonseca	.242m

== Guest (Invitada-Invitado) Performers ==
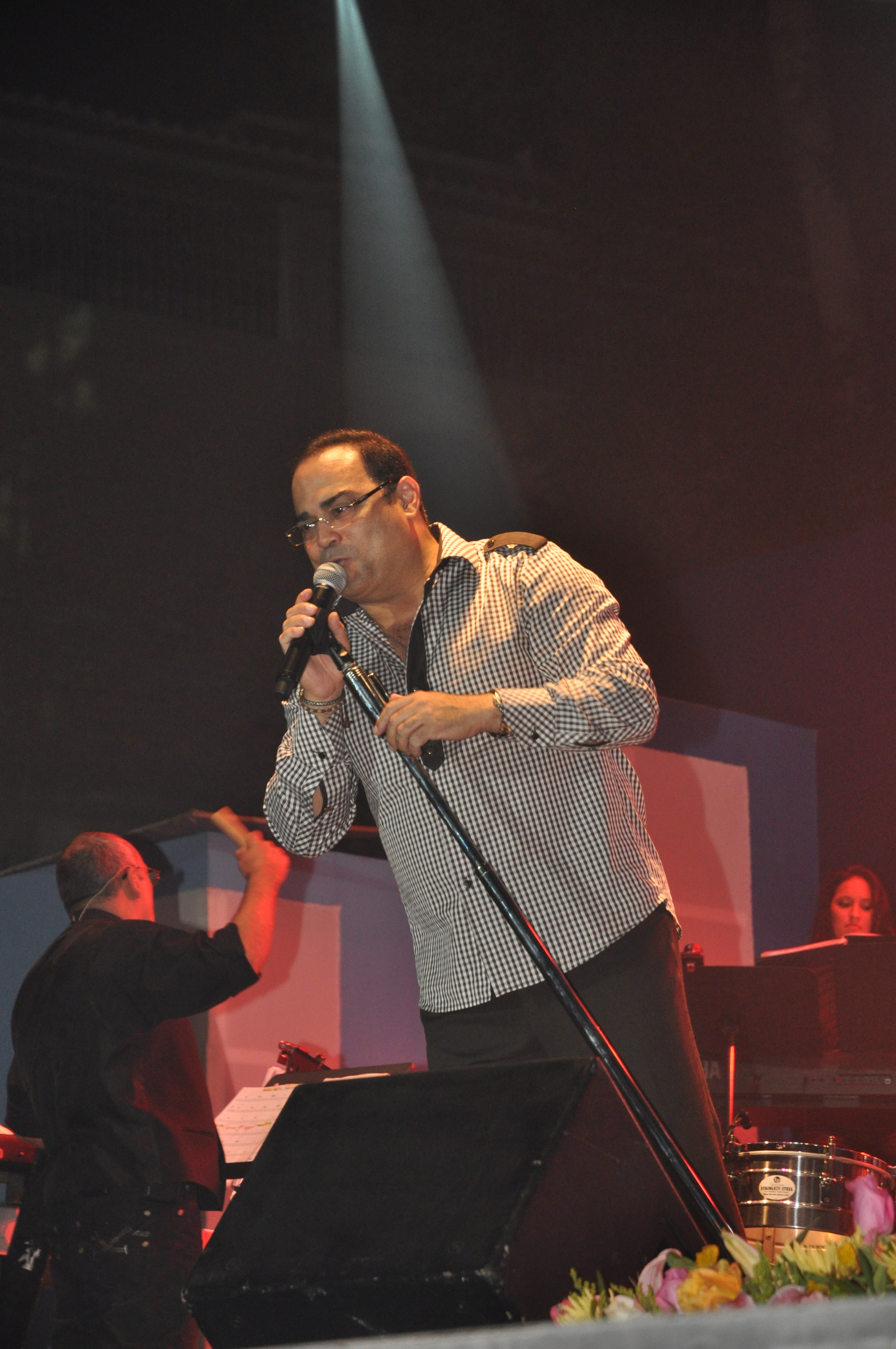
Gilberto Santa Rosa

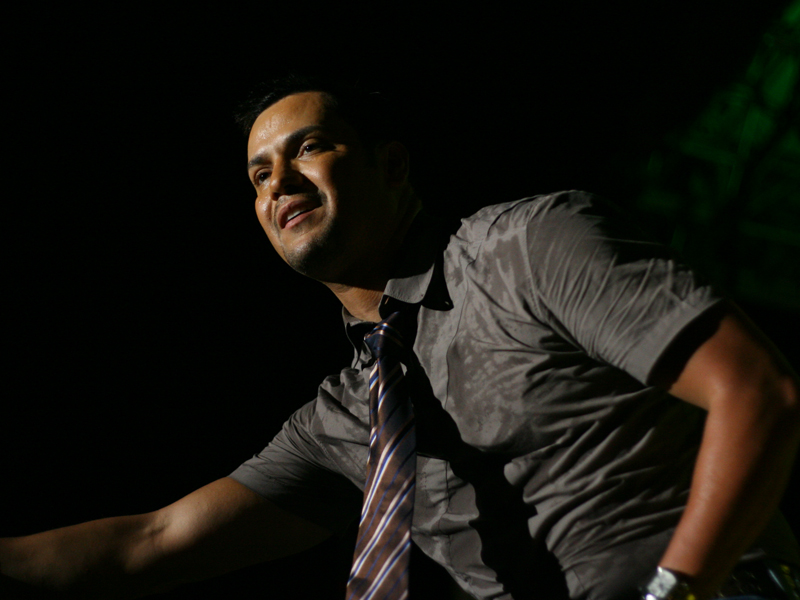
Víctor Manuel Ruiz Velázquez - Victor Manuelle

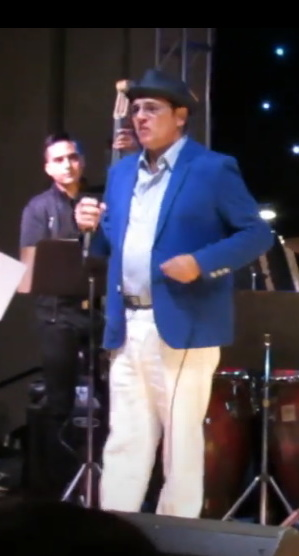
Johnny Rivera

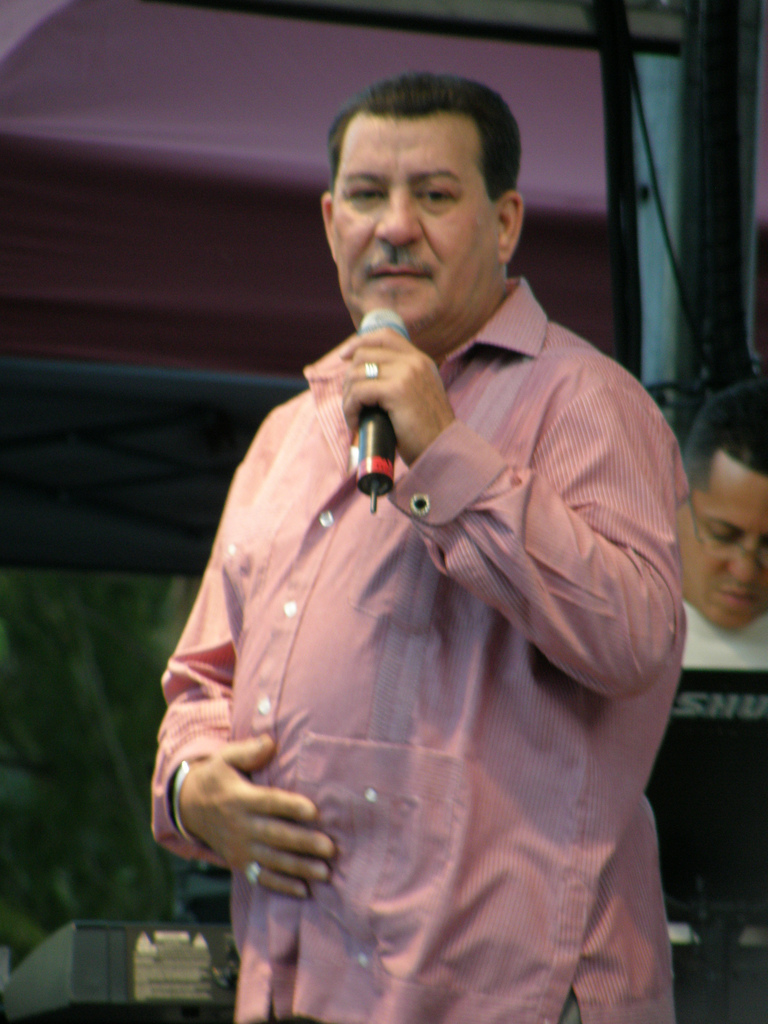
Julio César Rojas López - Tito Rojas

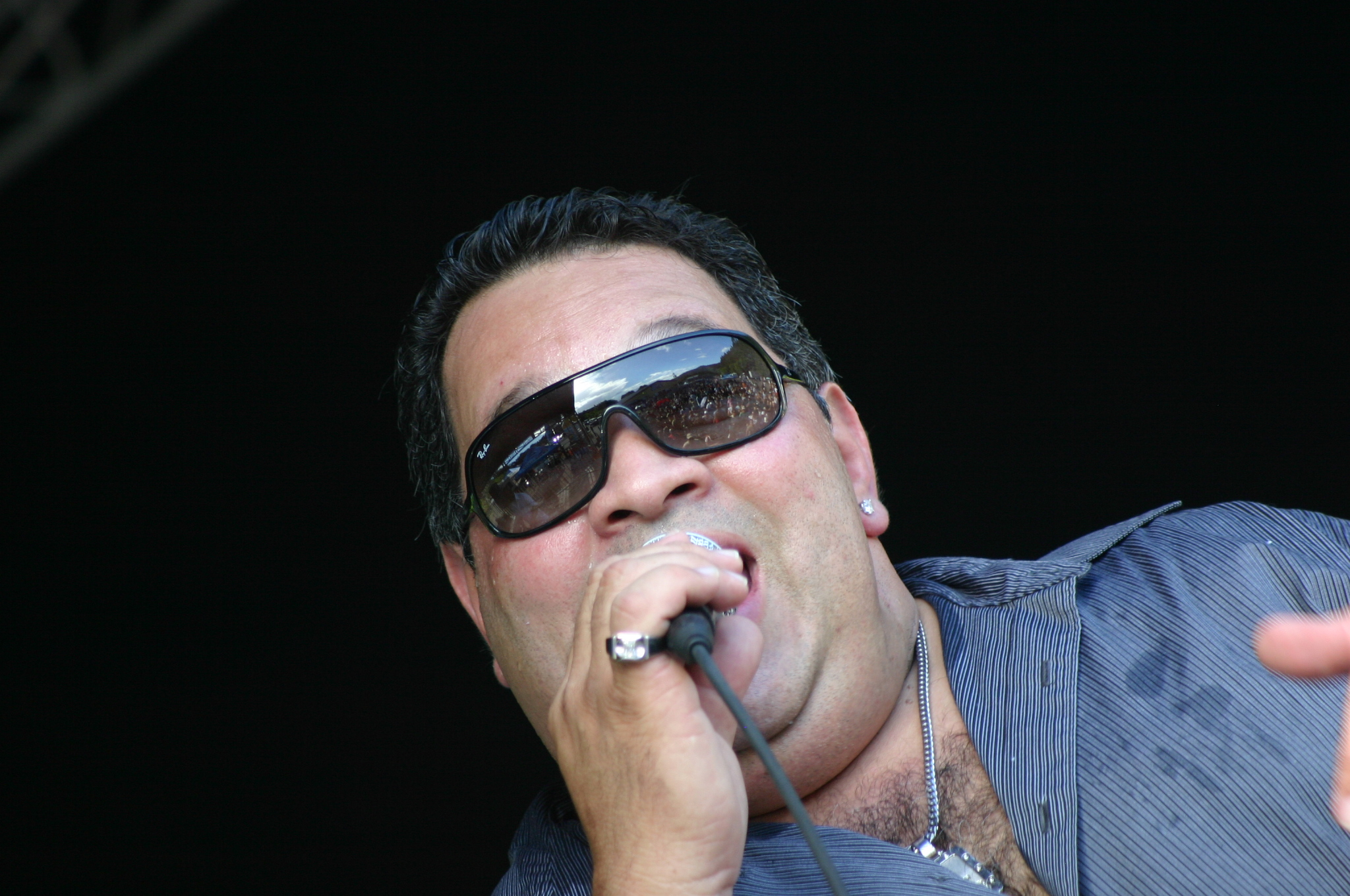
Humberto "Tito" Nieves

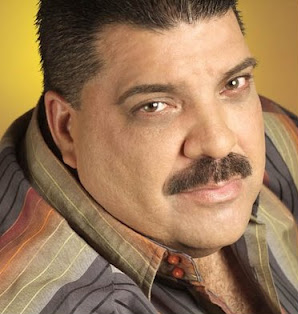
Ismael Ruiz Hernández - Maelo Ruiz

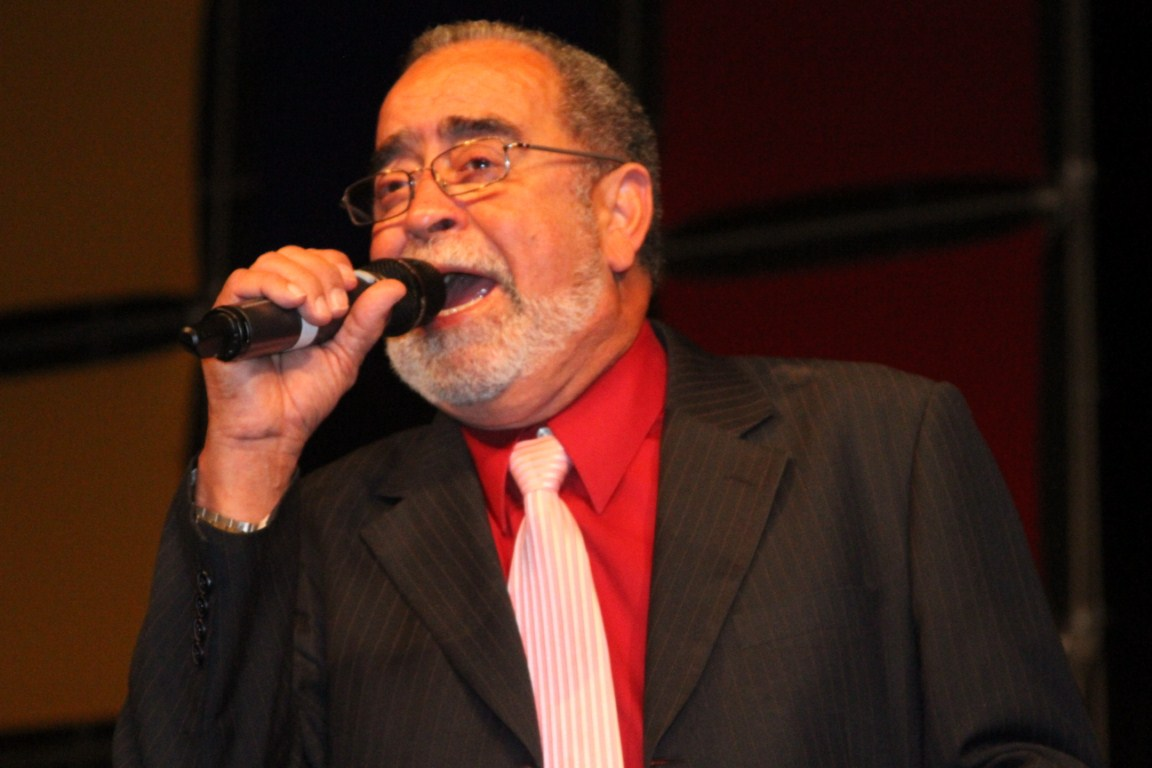
Andrés Montañez Rodríguez - Andy Montañez

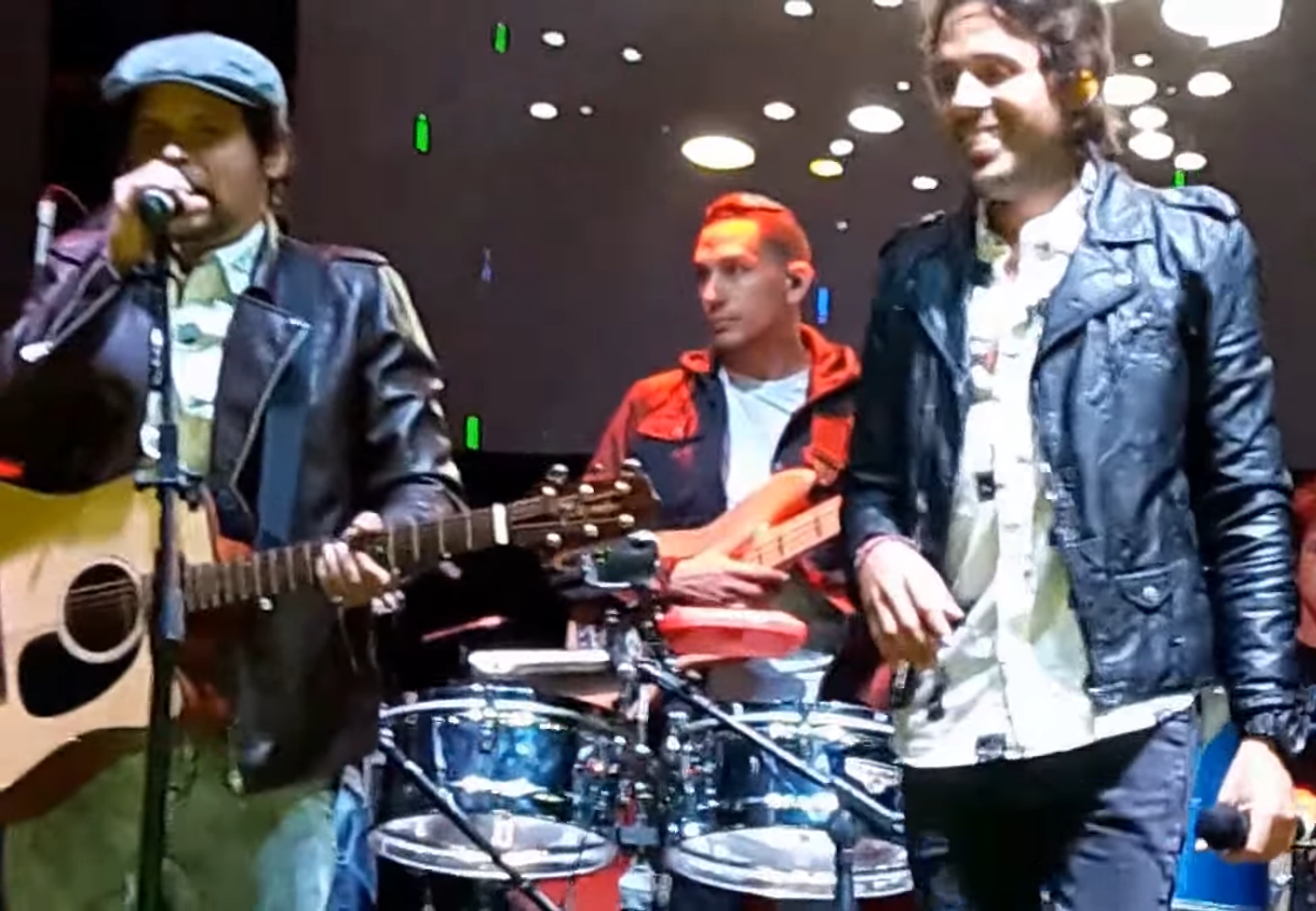
Servando & Florentino

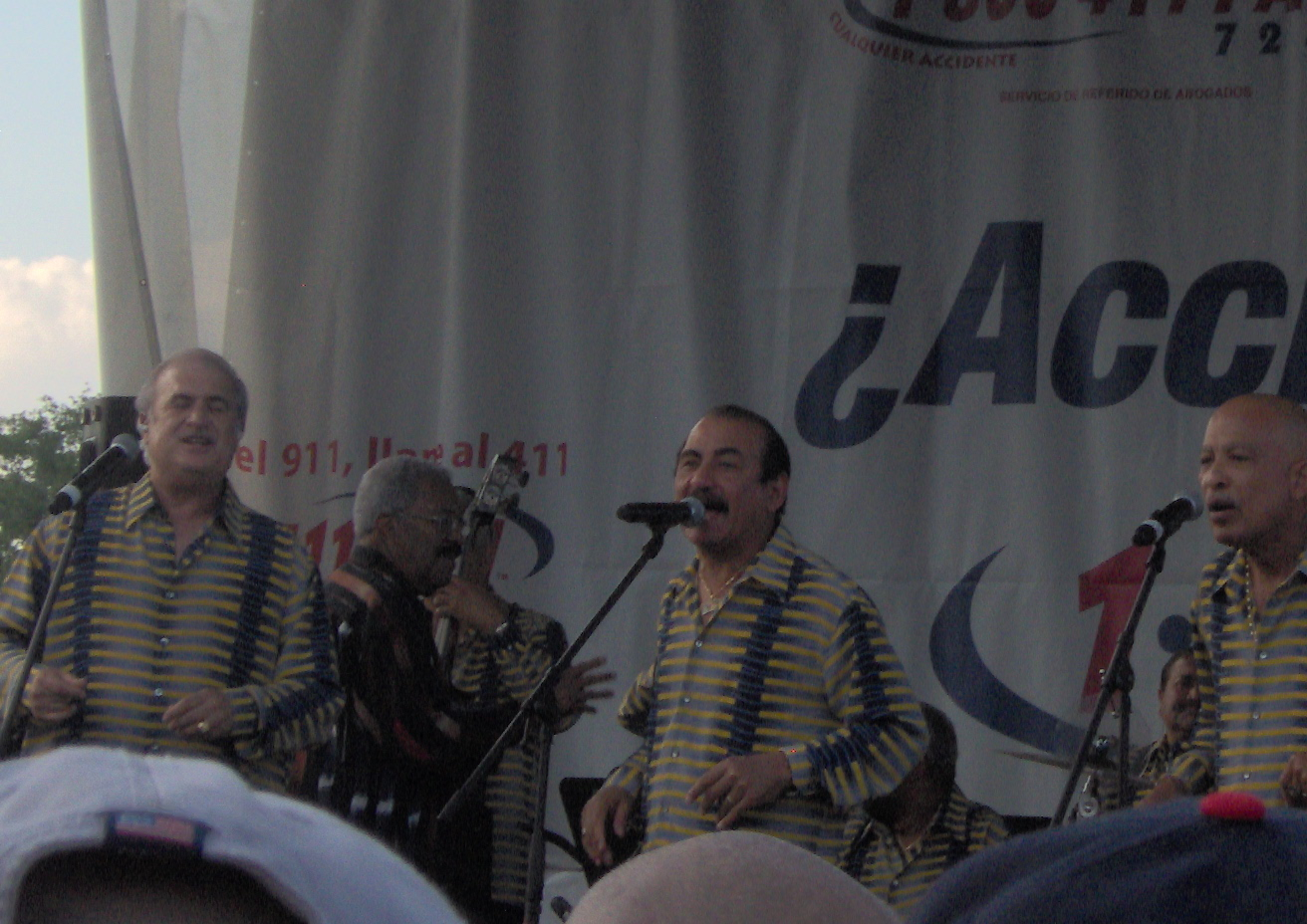
El Gran Combo de Puerto Rico

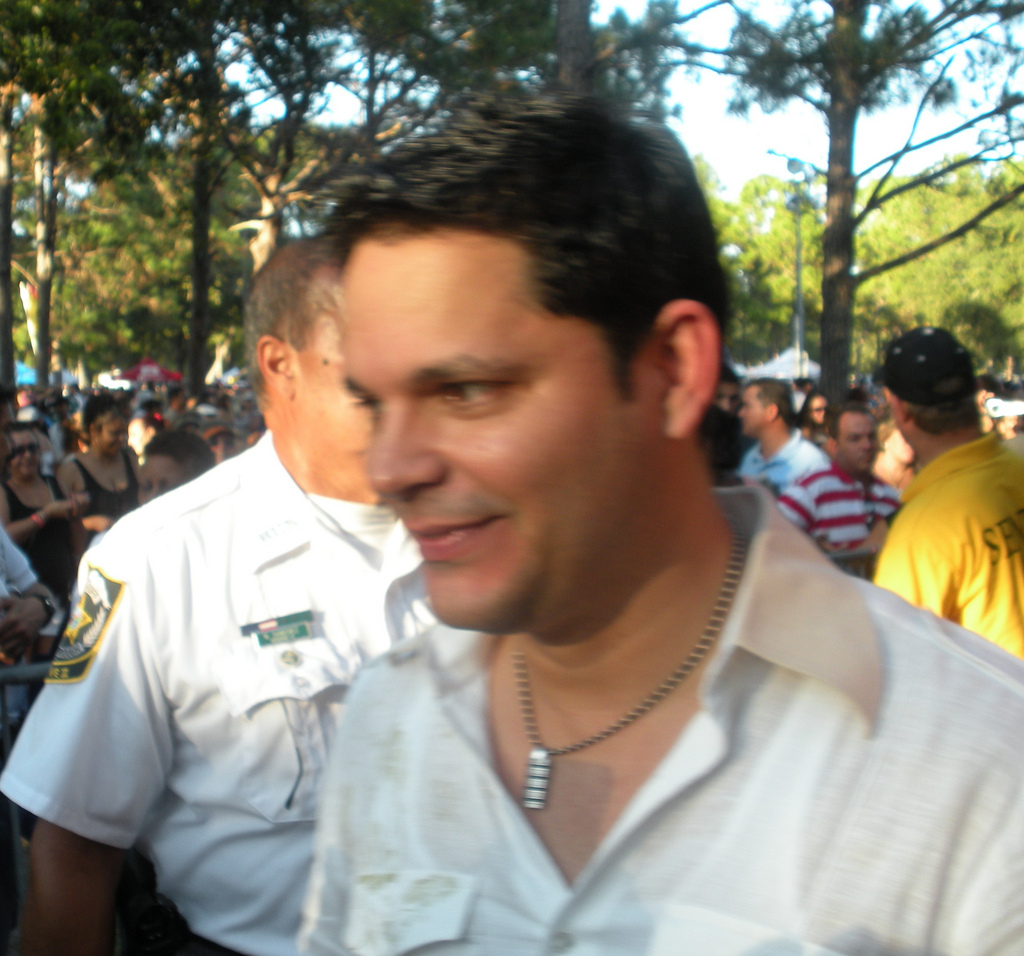
Rey Ruiz

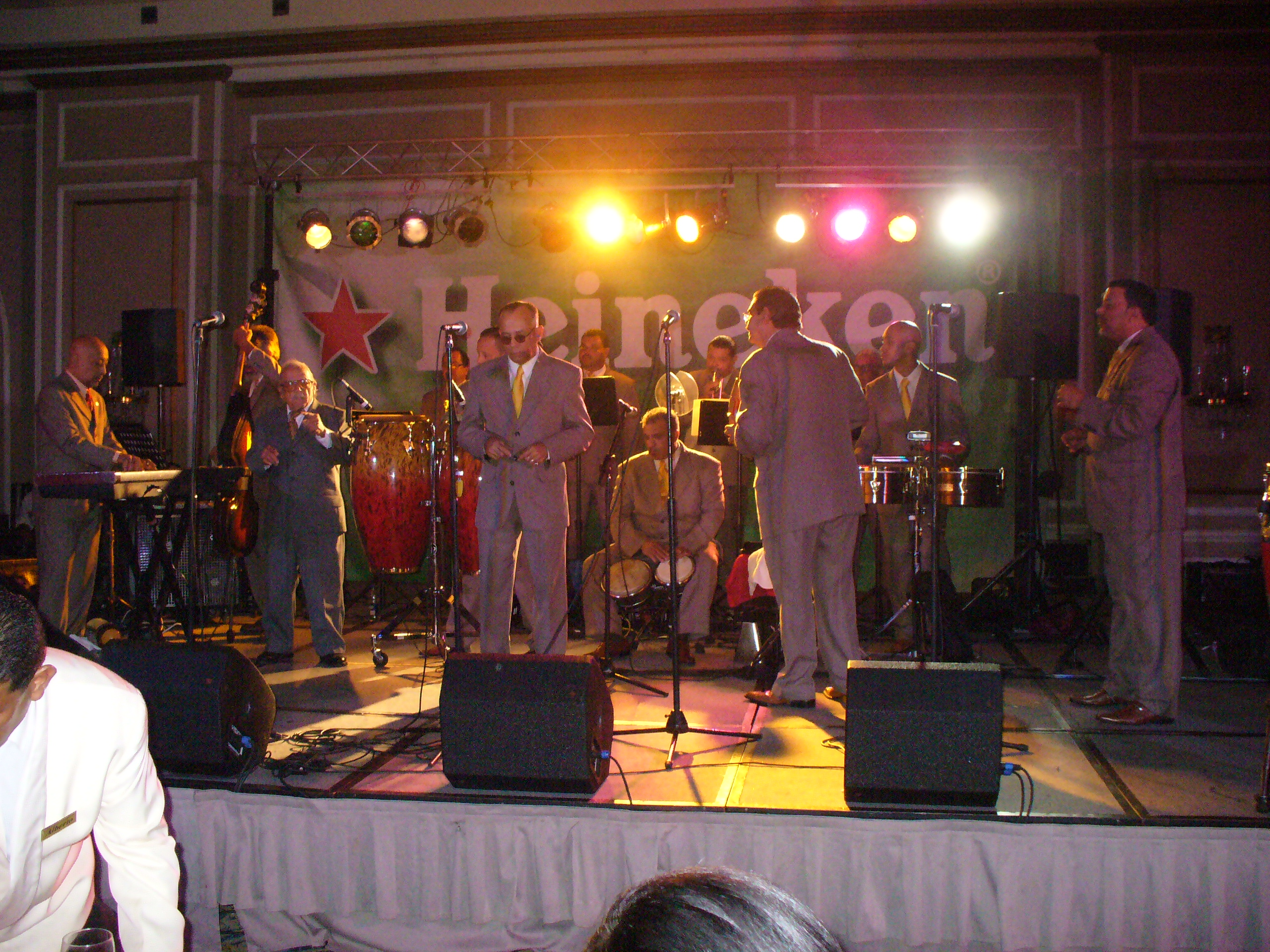
La Sonora Ponceña

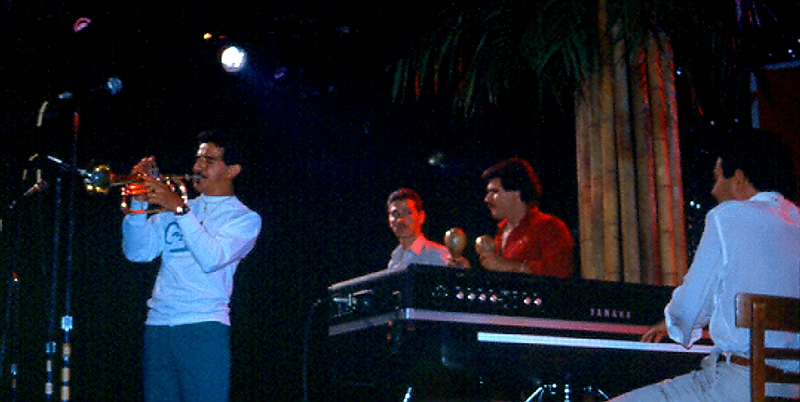
Luis "Perico" Ortiz

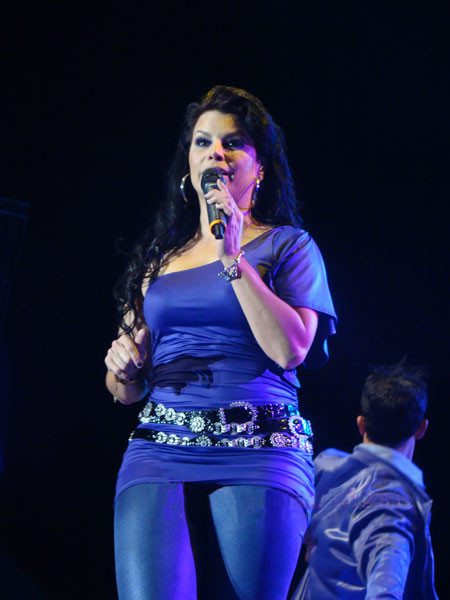
Olga Tañón

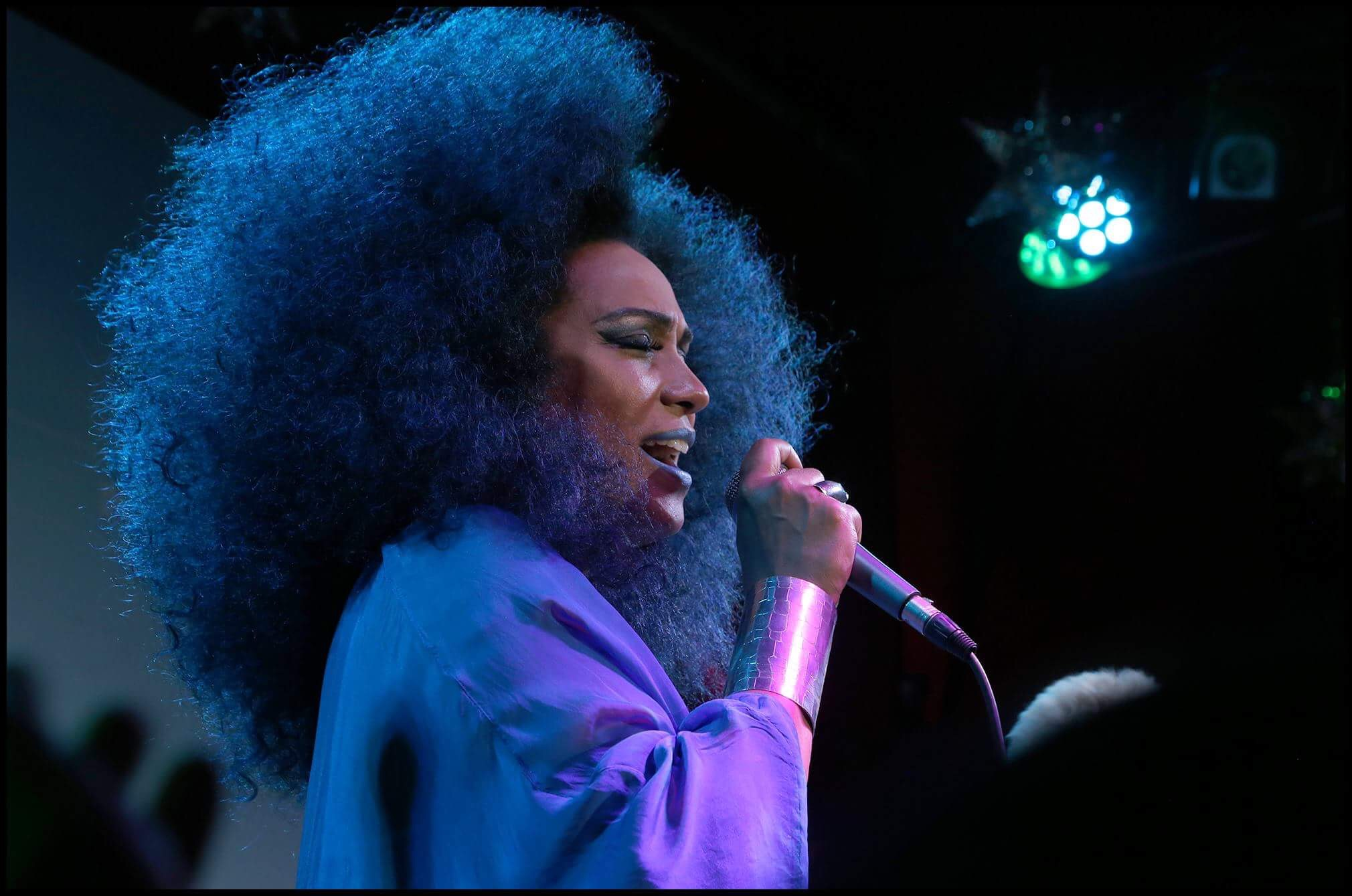
Aymée Nuviola

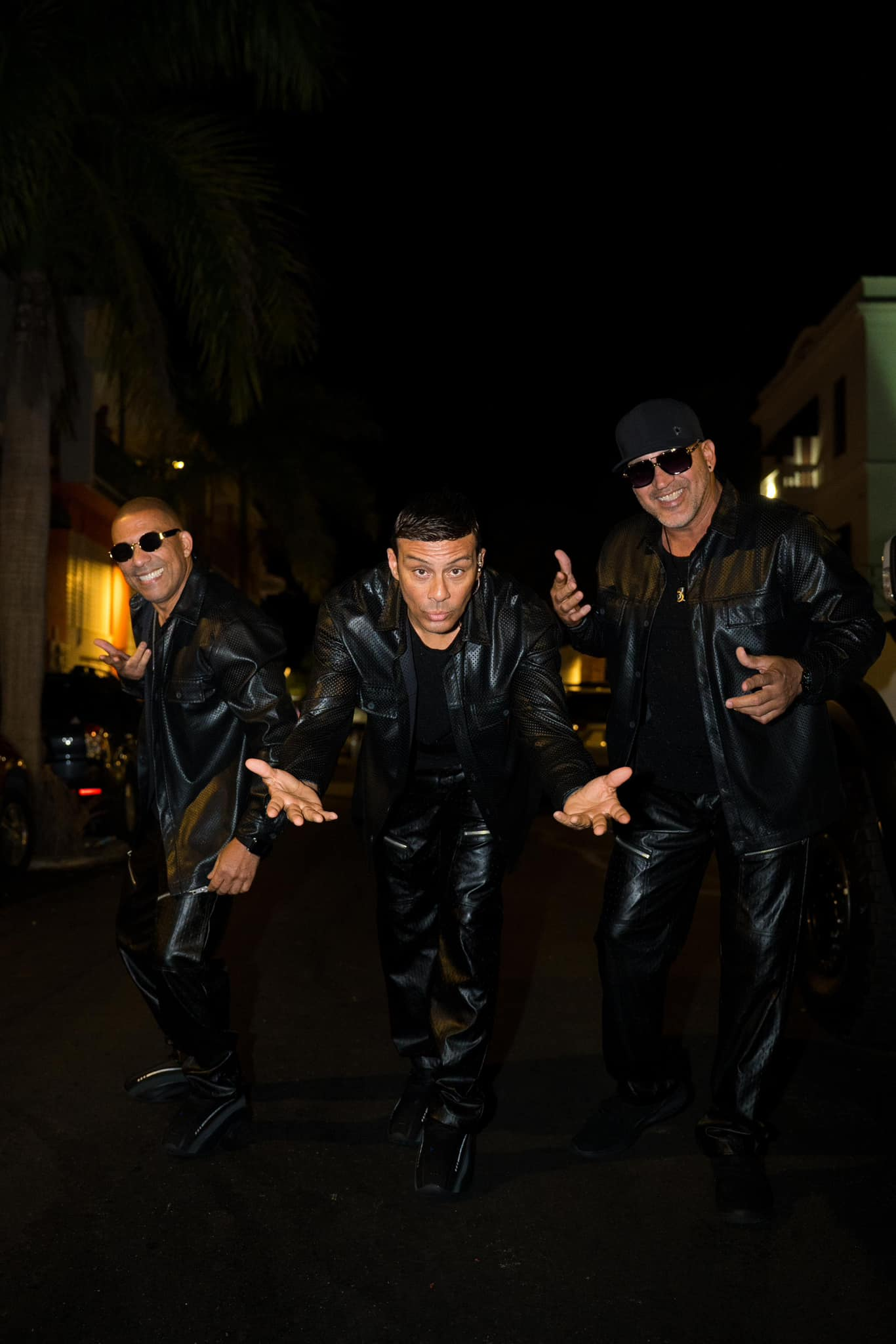
Oscarito Serrano (Left)

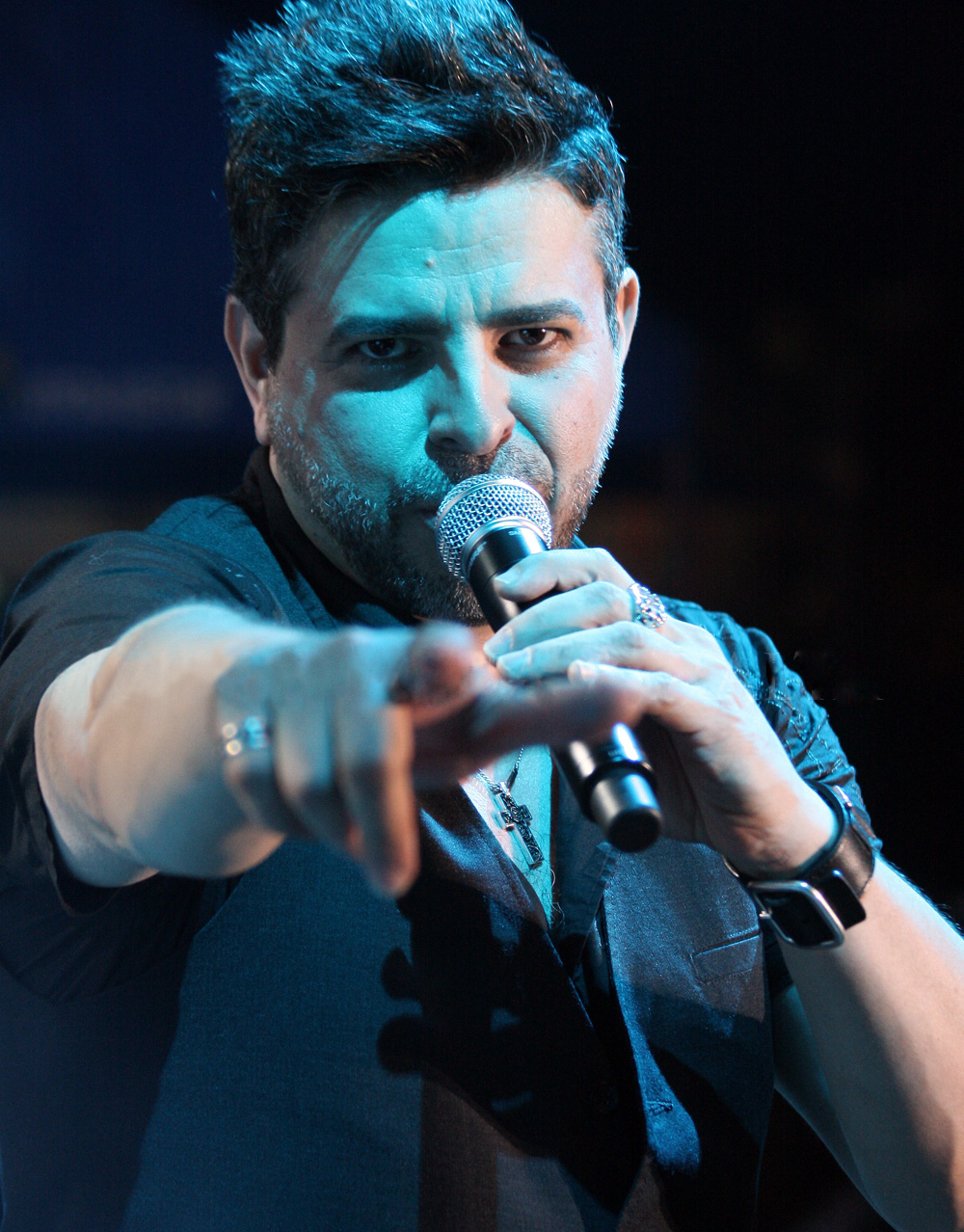
Luis Enrique (singer)

== Instrumentos - Instruments ==
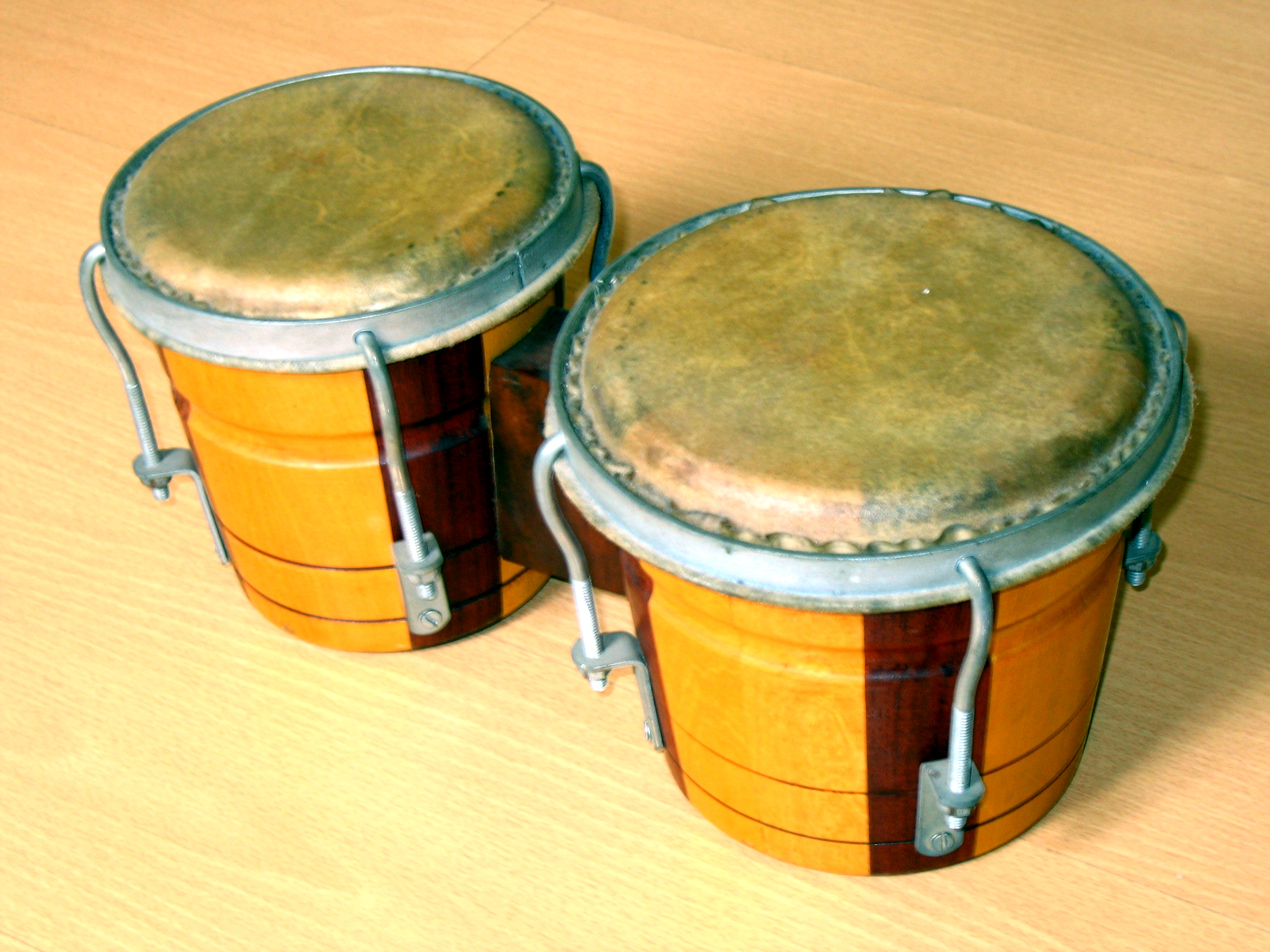
Los Bongós

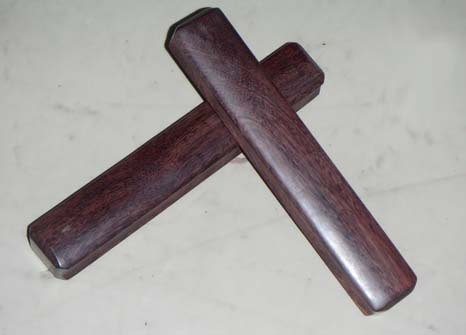
Ls Clave

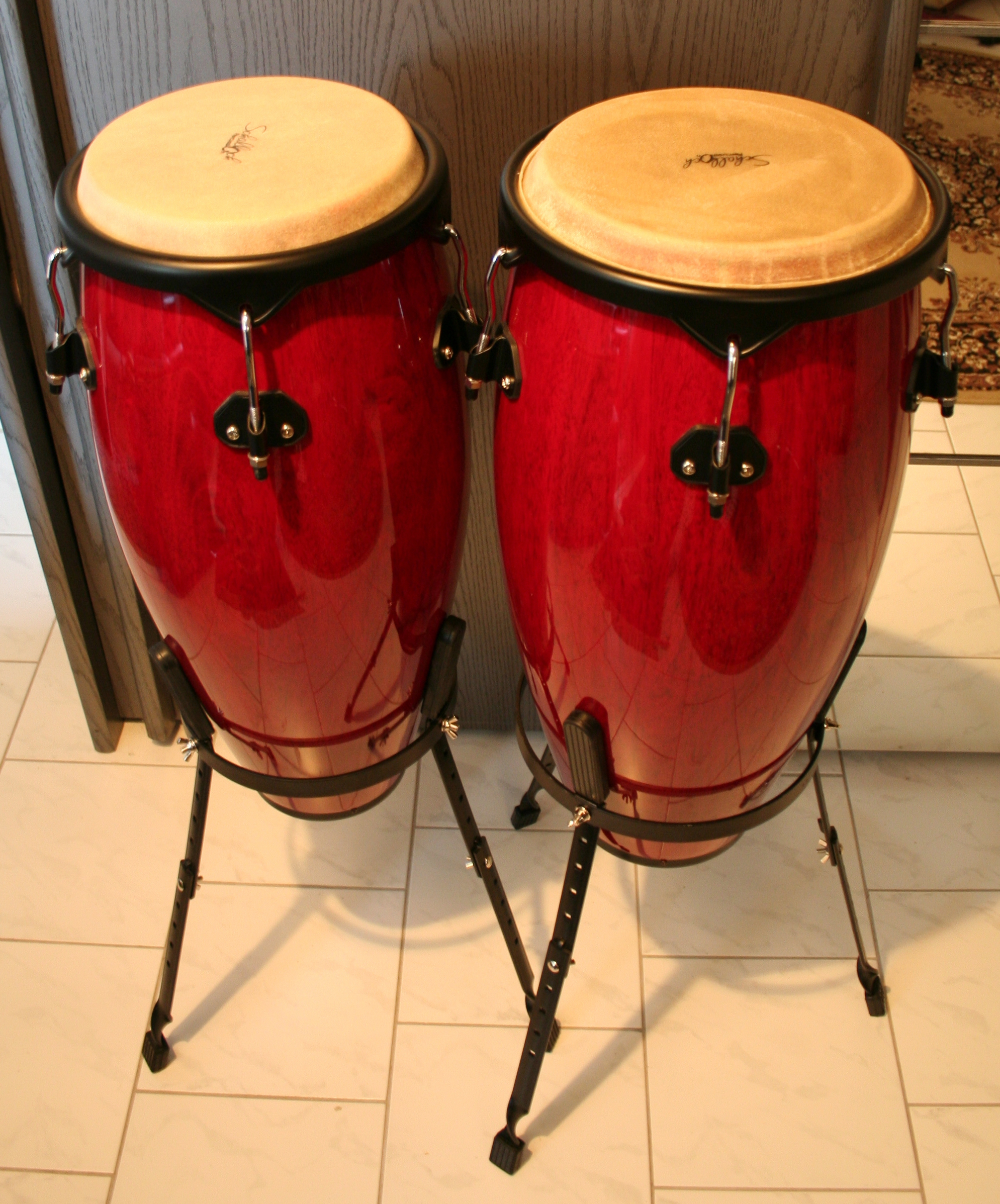
Las Congas-Tumbadoras

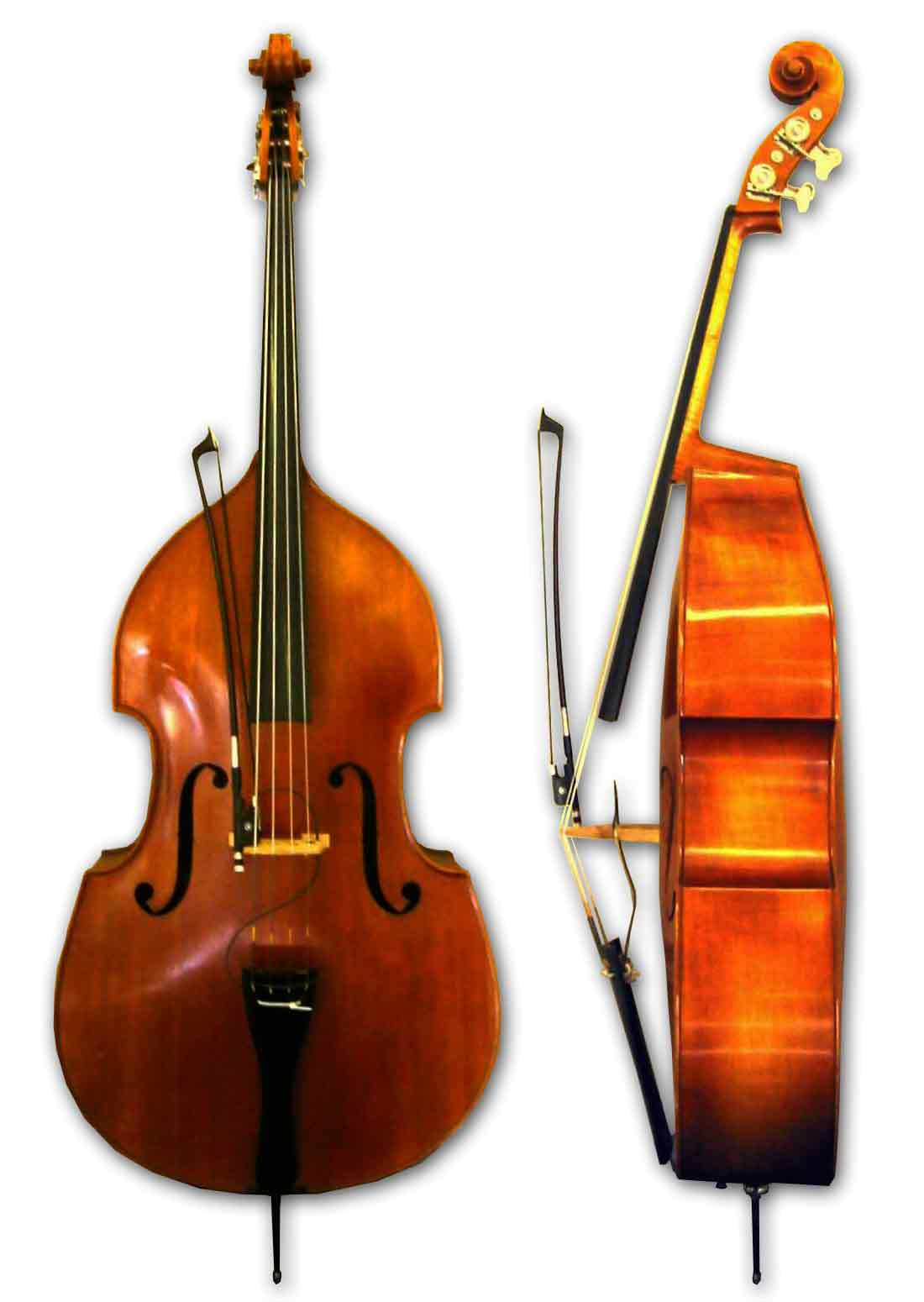
Contrabass

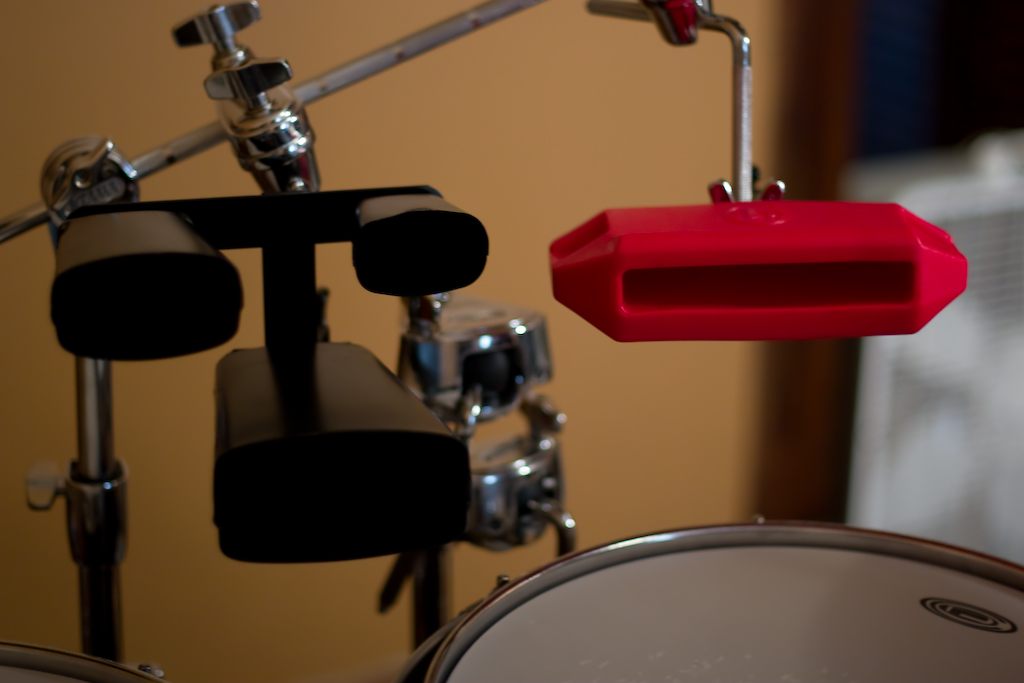
El Cencerro-Cowbells

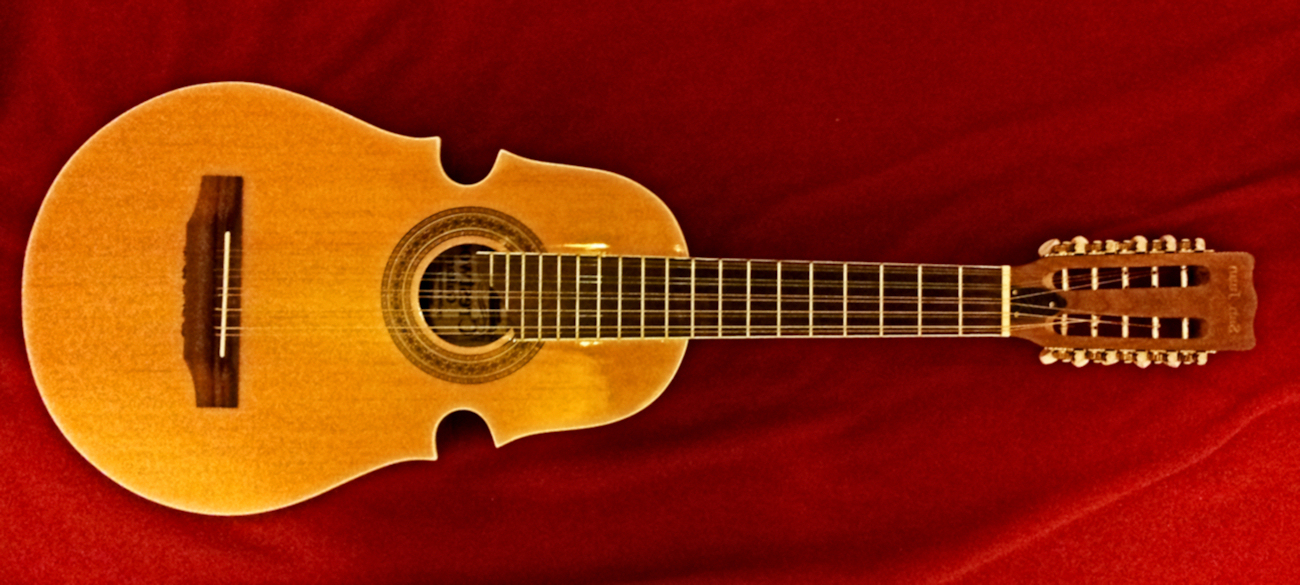
Cuatro

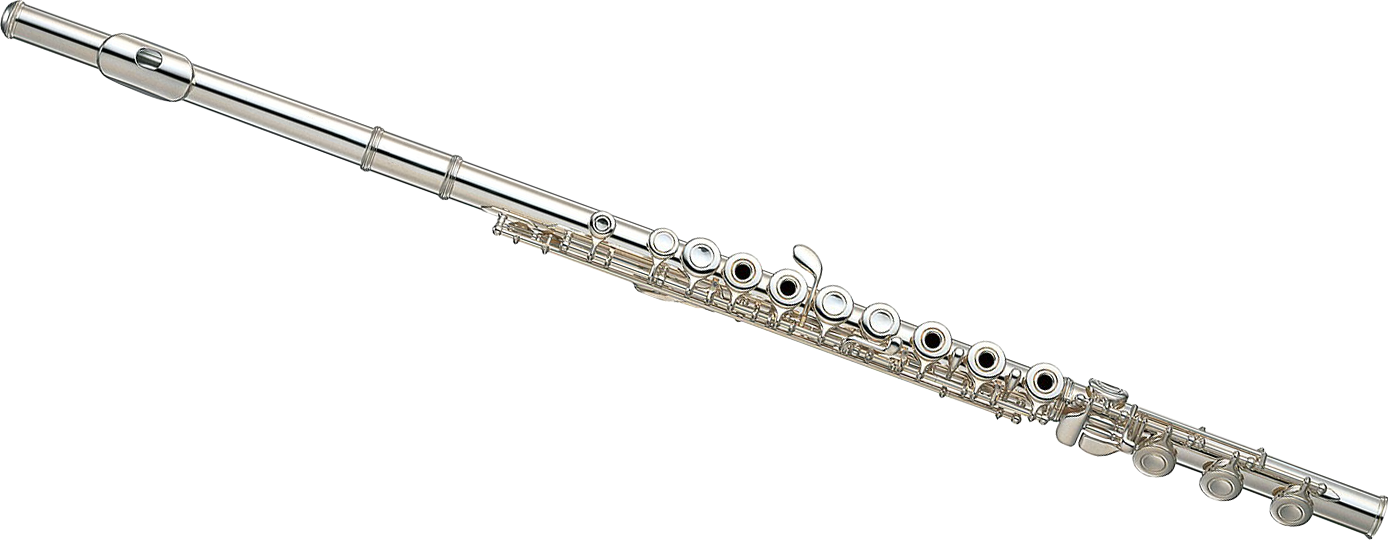
Flauta-Flute

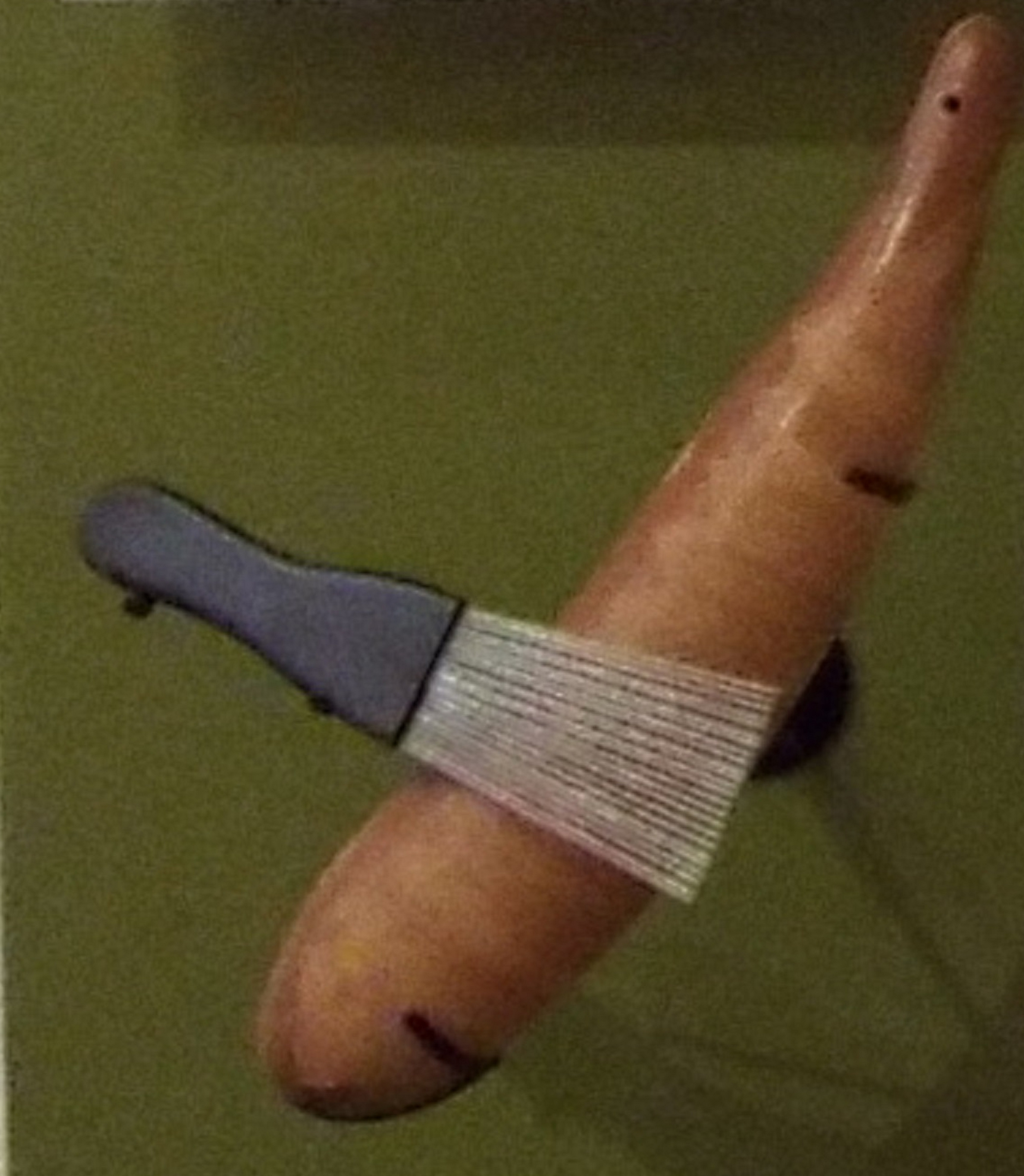
Güiro

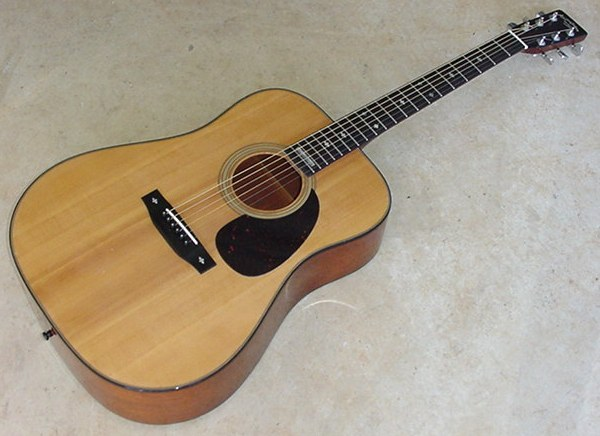
Guitarra-Guitar

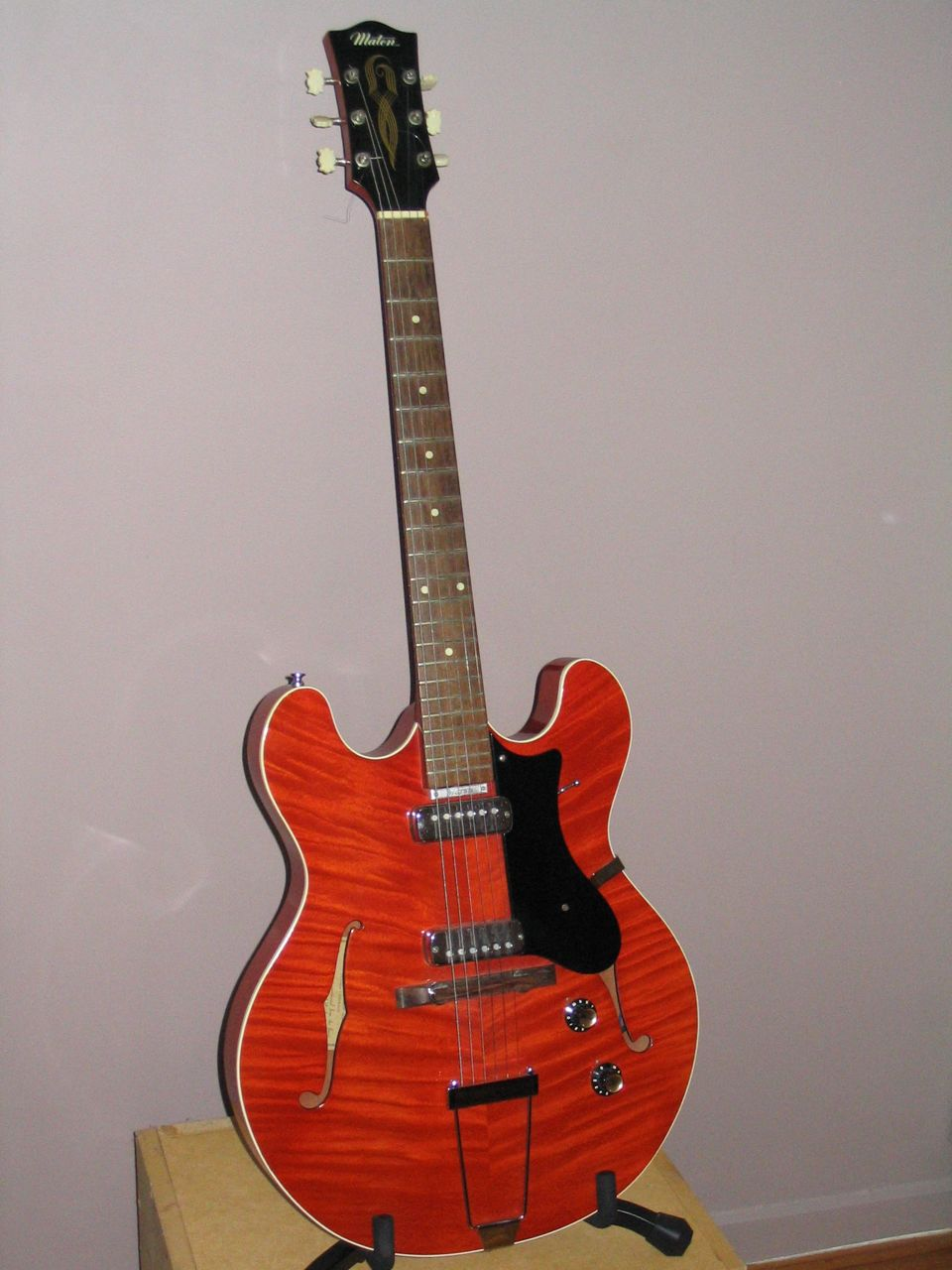
Guitarra Eléctrico Bajo-Bass

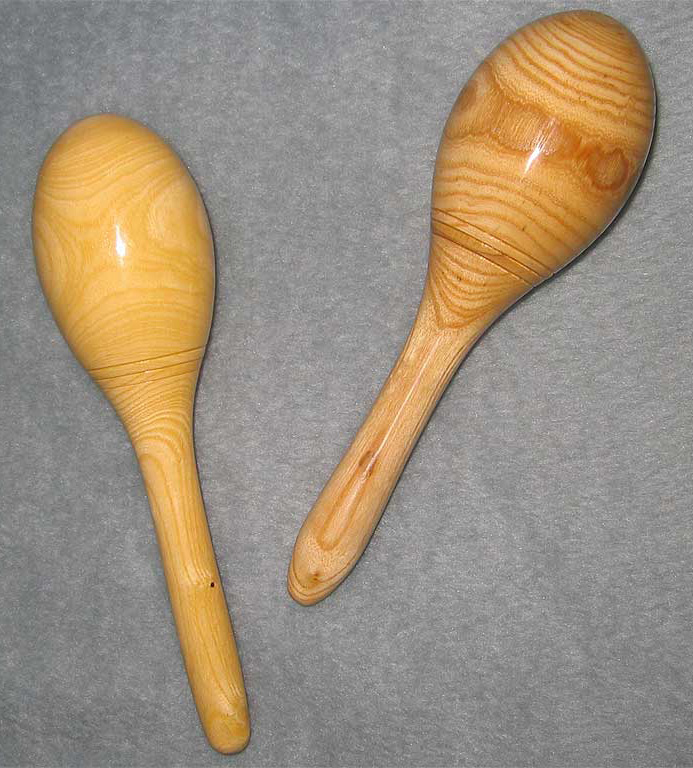
Maracas

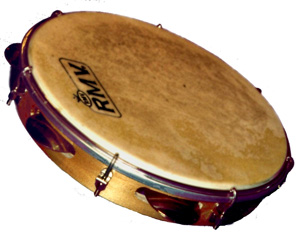
Pandeiro

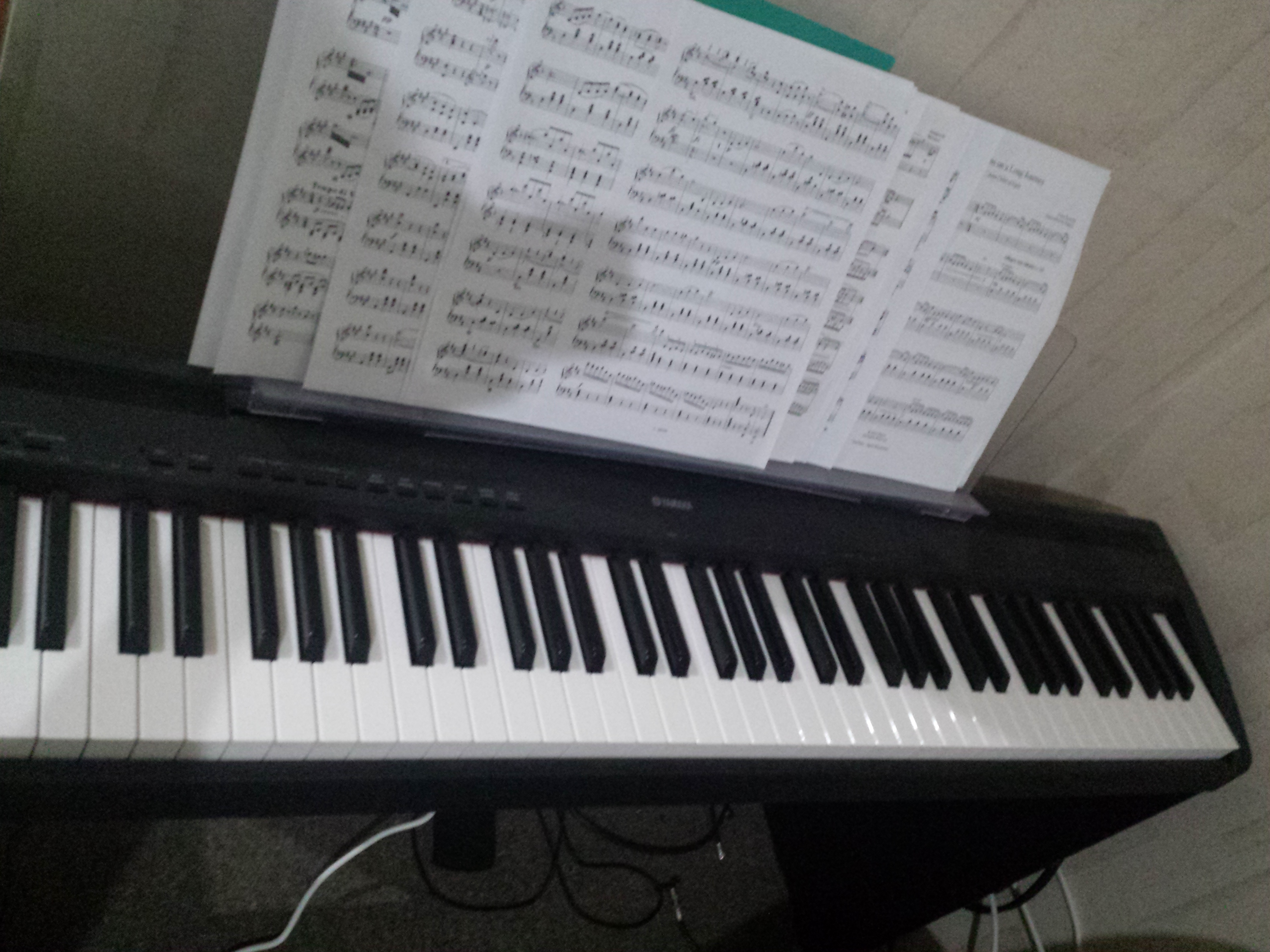
Piano Eléctrico

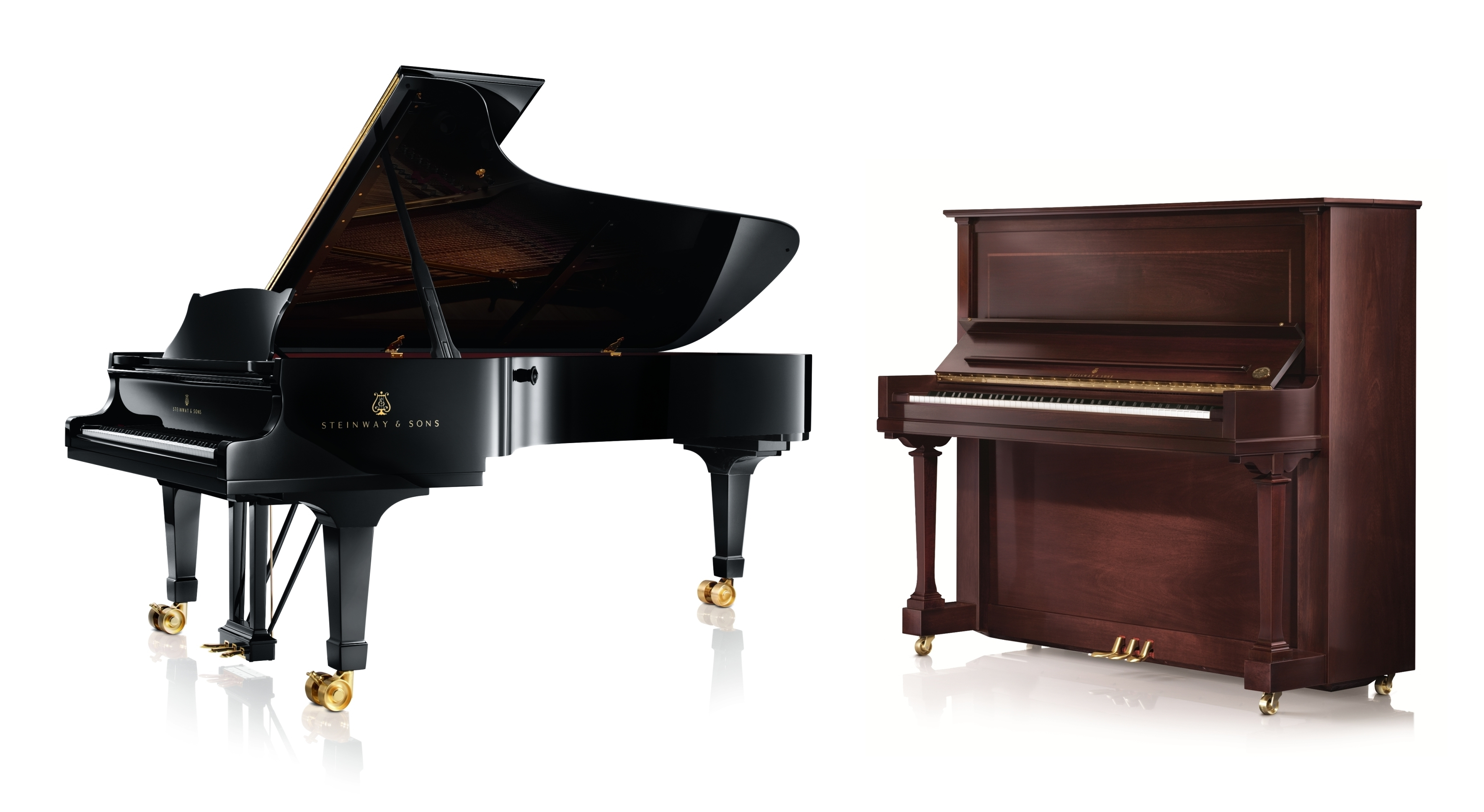
Piano

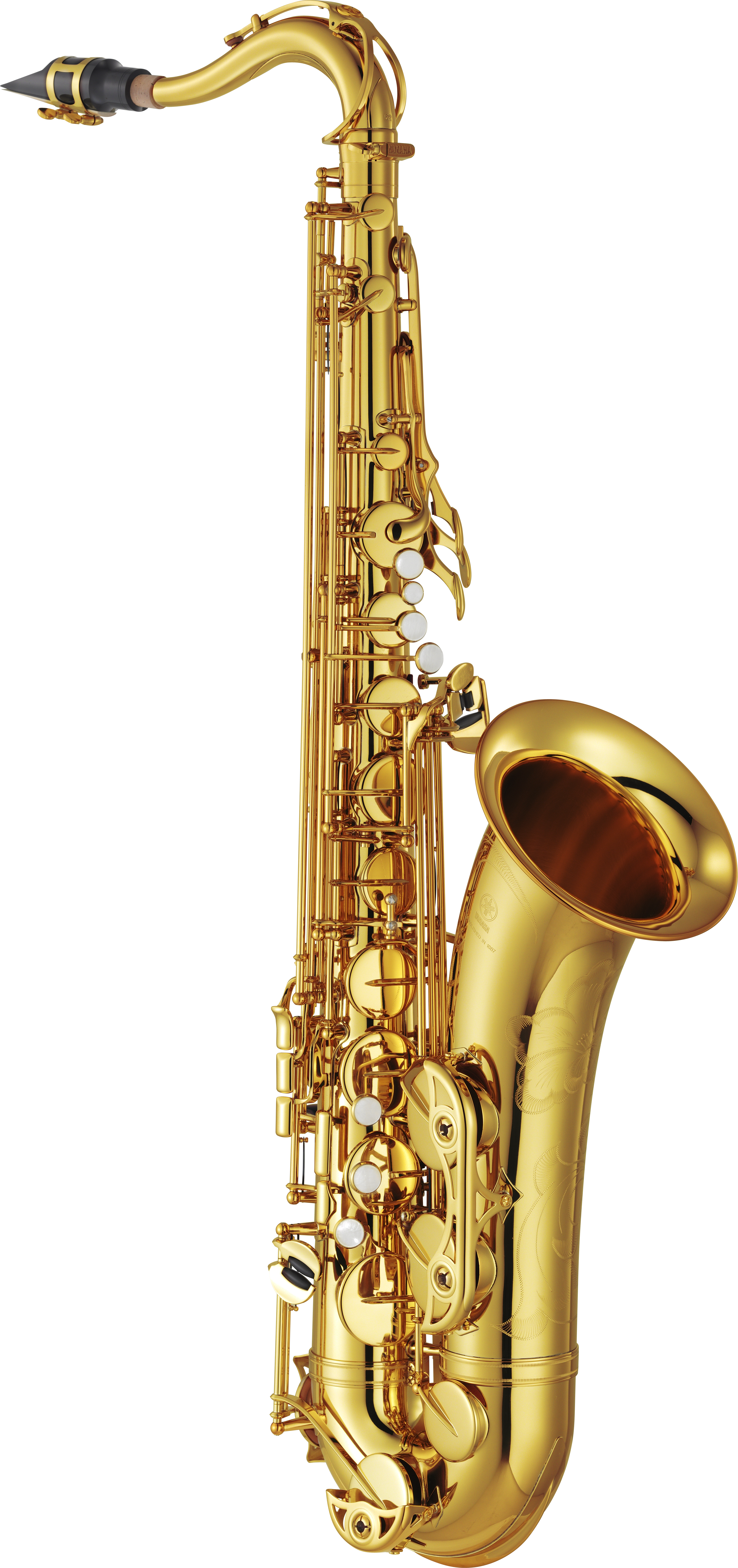
Saxophone

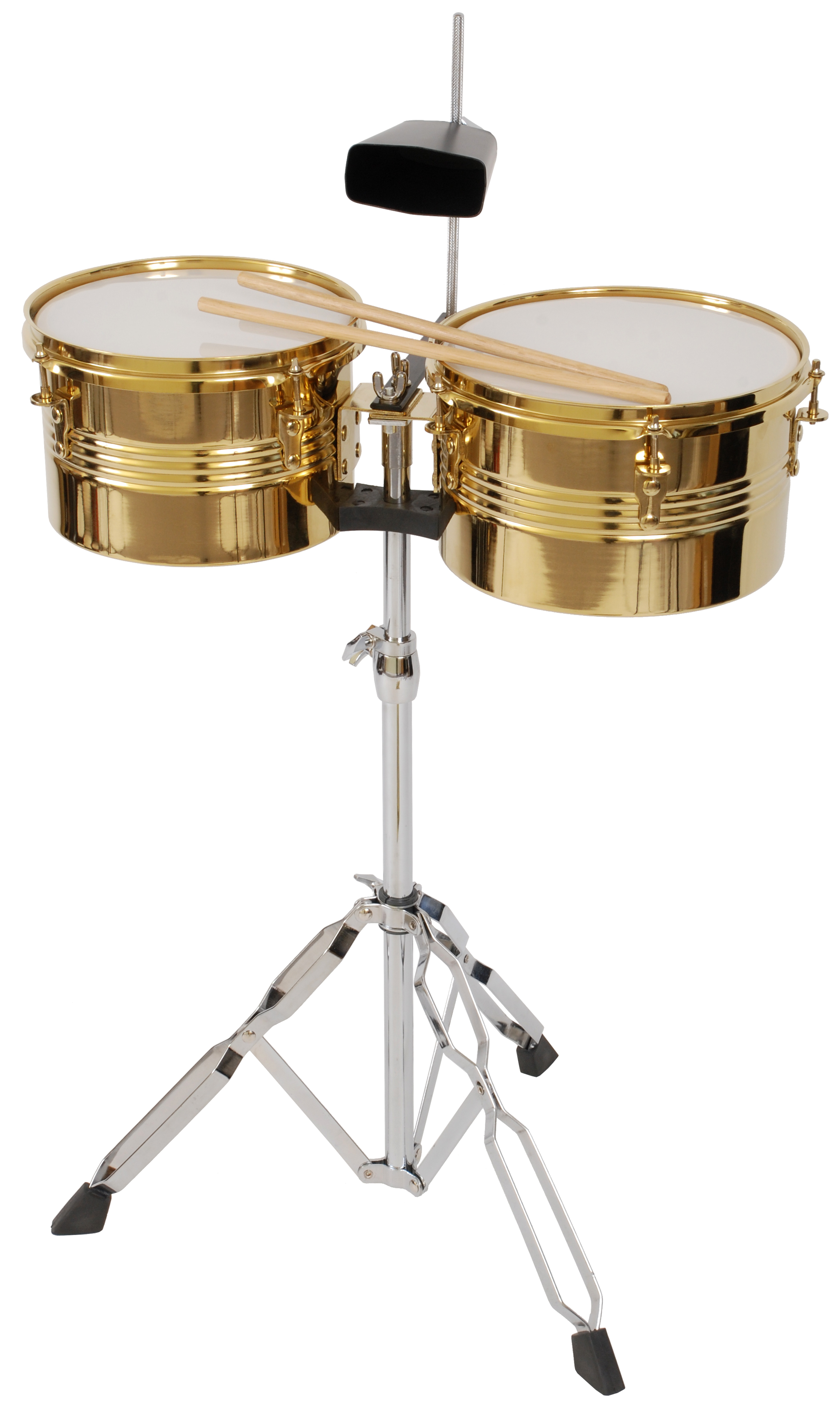
Los Timbales

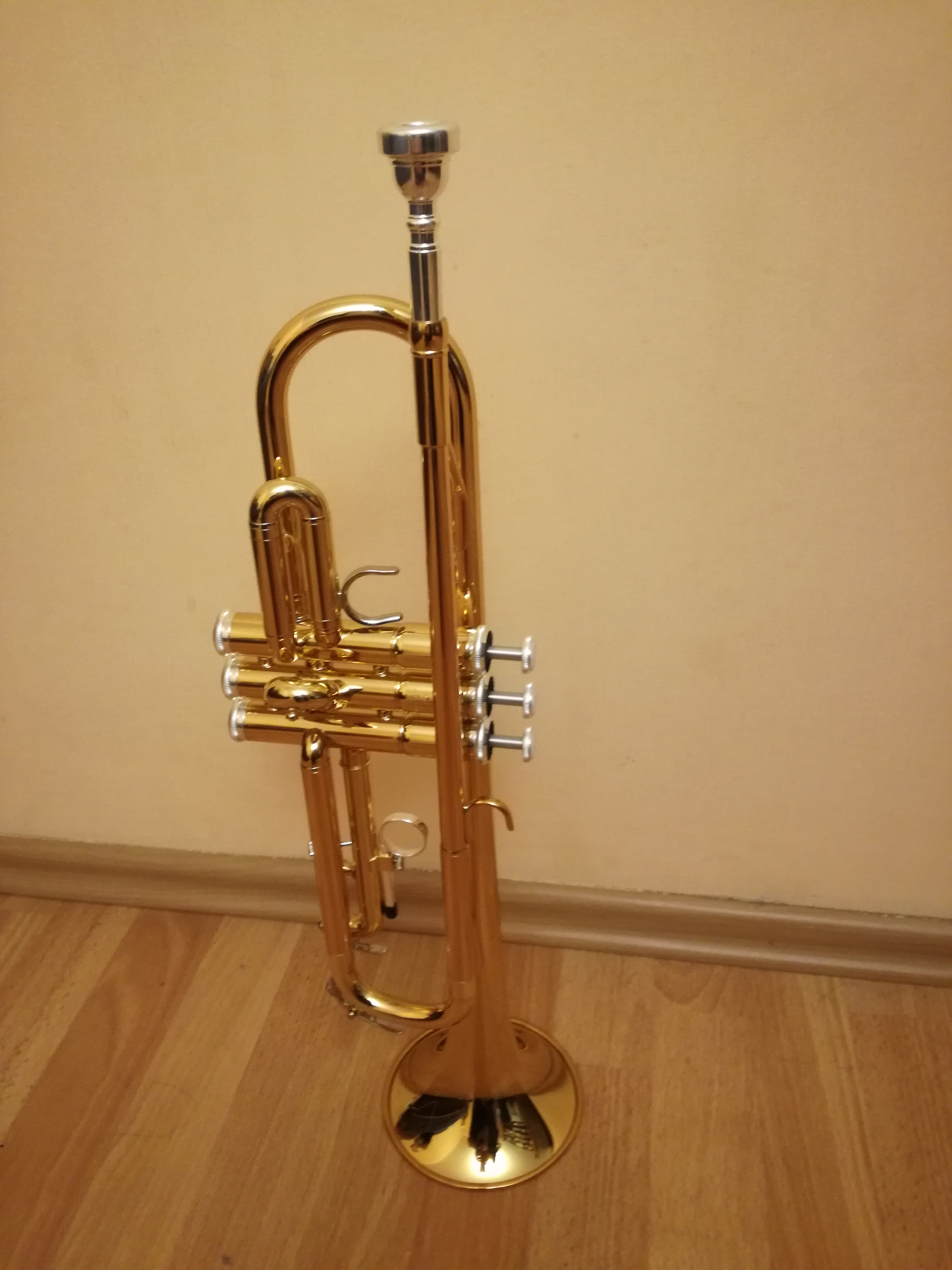
Trompet

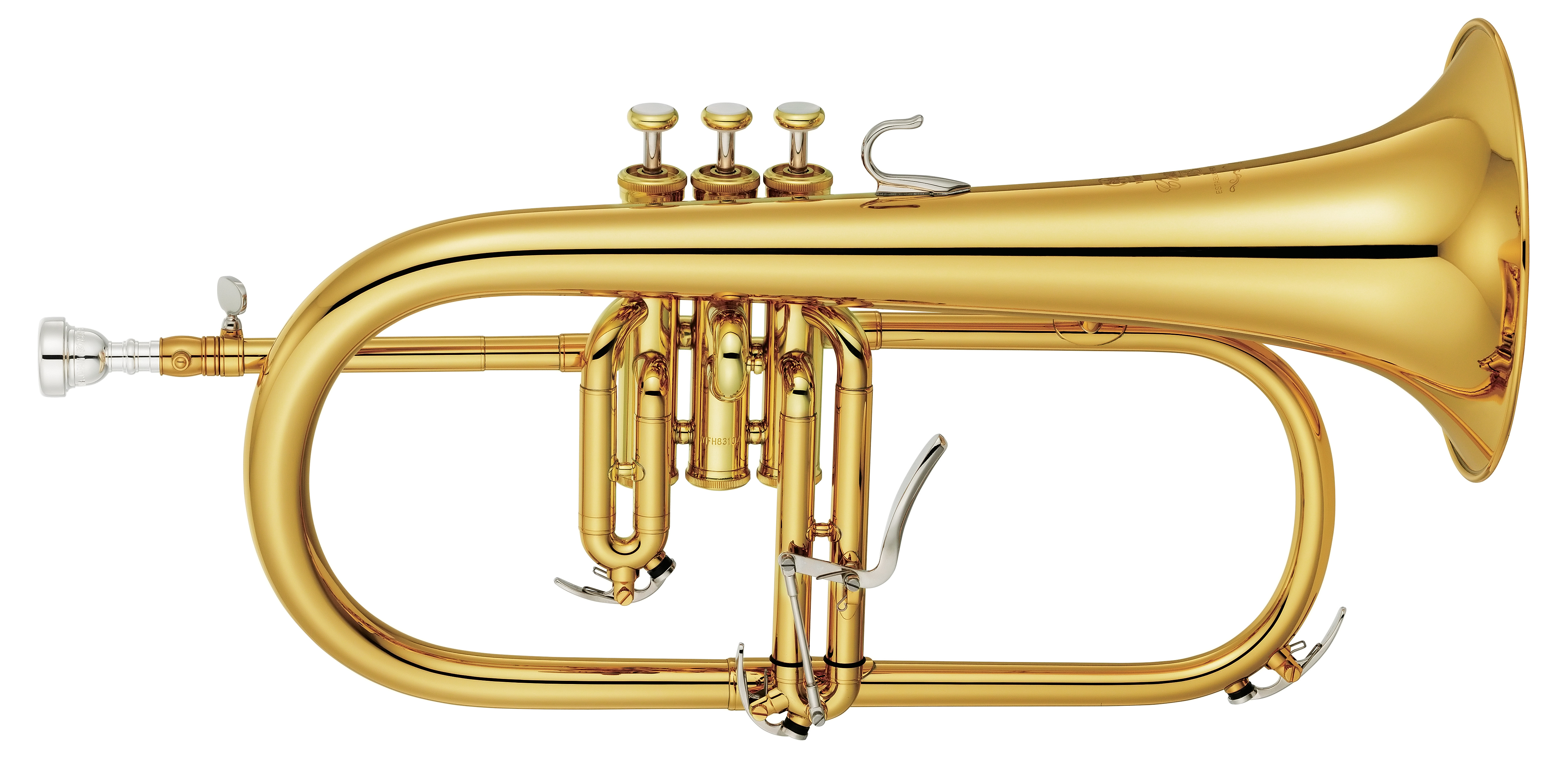
Flugelhorn

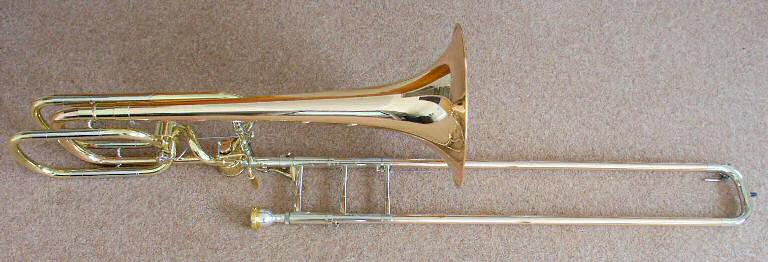
Trombone

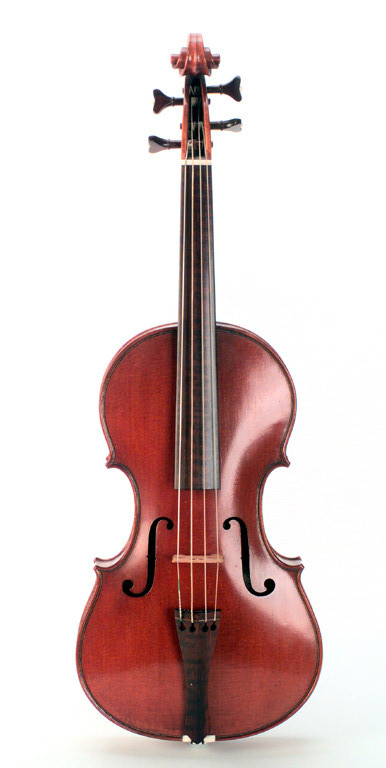
Violin

== See also ==
- Cultural diversity in Puerto Rico
- Culture of Puerto Rico
- History of Puerto Rico
- List of Puerto Ricans
- Museo de la Música Puertorriqueña
- Music of Latin America
- Music of the United States
- Music of Puerto Rico
  - Pandereta plenera
  - Puerto Rican cuatro
  - Tiple (Puerto Rico)
- Latin American music in the United States
- Latin Grammy Award for Best Salsa Album
- Latin freestyle
- Latin house
- Salsa (dance)
- Urbano music
- Music Genre
  - Aguinaldo (music)
  - Bolero
  - Bomba
  - Boogaloo
  - Cachi Cachi music
  - Danza
  - Décima
  - Guaracha
  - Latin trap
  - Merenge
  - Plena
  - Reggaeton
  - Salsa music
  - Salsa romántica
  - Seis
  - Son Cubano
  - Timba
  - Tropical music
  - Twoubadou
