= Christian Nieves =

Puerto Rican cuatro player

- Born: Christian Nieves Maldonado; San Juan, Puerto Rico
- Musical career
- Instrument: Cuatro

Christian Nieves is a Puerto Rican cuatro player. Nieves is mostly known for having been a performer in the American reality television series Q'Viva!: The Chosen, where his performance became famous for bringing singer Jennifer Lopez to tears who considered the melody very emotional.

On December 9, 2021, Christian Nieves was the featured guest on Norberto Vélez's YouTube channel titled "Sesiones Desde La Loma Ep. 23".

== Biography ==
Christian Javier Nieves Maldonado was born at the Hospital del Maestro in San Juan, Puerto Rico. He was raised by his parents Modesto Nieves and Beatriz Maldonado in the neighborhood Cedro Abajo in Naranjito. His father, known as "El zurdo de Naranjito" (Naranjito's lefty) was a cuatro musician. It was in your home very young at the age of 3 years started to interpret popular songs with a four that between his grandfather and his father gave him. He learnt to play the themes like "Green light", "Mi viejo San Juan" as well as six, aguinaldos, dances and other styles that exist in the Puerto Rican music. In his childhood, Christian participated in the powers of four in all Puerto Rico in which obtained first place, was also recognized by the Institute of Puerto Rican culture as the most talented young of our national instrument, the Puerto Rican Cuatro. With only 10 years of age as part of their development of labor reaffirms from typical Puerto Rican music. With which led him to represent his country all over the world in countries like: United States, as well as to the Puerto Rican communities in New York City, Chicago, Connecticut, Boston and Los Angeles, Canada, Mexico, Argentina, Brazil, Uruguay, Venezuela, Colombia, Peru, Switzerland, Belgium, England, Spain, the Netherlands, Germany, Denmark, France, Japan, and Cuba, among many others.

Christian, along with four talented young unite their forces and ideas to form his own group, Harbour estate, integrated the typical music to rock highlighting the instrument of the Puerto Rican cuatro, this with the purpose of presenting an innovative proposal within the Rock genre in Spanish in Puerto Rico, United States and Latin America. The introduction of the Puerto Rican Cuatro as the main instrument of the band manages to quickly capture the attention of the public in their presentations, both so the Group was nominated for the awards your music as the revelation of the year 2001.

Some of the most important achievements of Christian Nieves has been record in productions with groups like: the official Ballet Folklorico de Puerto Rico, much and the typical national, Mapeye, as well as with artists recognized both nationally and internationally: Andres Jimenez ("El Jibaro"), Danny Rivera, Roy Brown, making point in another are, Antonio Cabán, Juan Luis Guerra, Ruben Blades, and his most recent intervention with Tommy Torres and the Puerto Rican star Ricky Martin which highlights his talent with the indigenous instrument giving a musical nuance very harmonic and different to each piece.

The world knew next Ricky Martin, in August 2006 when he was joined in the live recording of his album 'Unplugged' in Miami. And next, his participation in the year 2012, as one of the selected from among a group of United States and Latin American artists who participated in the television project Q' live The Chosen, that the marriage of Marc Anthony and Jennifer López produced in partnership with Simon Fuller, creator of "American Idol". In Europe he is known for his intervention with the Spanish singer-songwriter Pablo Alborán TERRAL production.

Reach different parts of the world with Ricky Martin, Draco Rosa and JLO makes him remember his trips to different countries, where much earlier touched jíbaro music and rhythms of trova.

Arguably, the Christian path took a turn important after participating in trade topics turned into hits by the world, but his talent had given to talk about much before. As a child he was a familiar face to the people of his town, which appointment was the squares and native music festivals within and outside Puerto Rico. It is there where came from his favorite lessons, "village people".

Their first album as a solo artist 'My mountain', Christian contains many experiences and musical influences of his travels. The first part is instrumental fusion. It includes, among others, rhythms of Brazil, Spain, Cuba, Ecuador and Puerto Rico. Only in one of the themes there is a letter in the voice of one of his sisters, Monika. Ricardo Pons, Pancho Irizarri musicians participate, Furthermore, Irizarry, Cacho Montalvo, Eric Figueroa, Anthony Carrillo and Raúl Maldonado (his uncle). For them and others like Neftalí Ortiz, Eddie López and Angel Fernandez, Christian saves a great deal of respect and admiration.

With his work, Christian seeks to express their style but also to carry a message. Concerned about the exploitation of natural resources in a nation as small as Puerto Rico, but above all things hits you poor defense to the talents of the values that distinguish us as a people, including sport and, of course, the music.

For Christian Nieves its purpose and aims to bring the maximum expression of the typical Puerto Rican music as a sign to the whole world and always putting in front the Almighty. Finally, the subtlety of the Christian Nieves cuatro notes marks his style. Educated in the sound streets of the center of the island, the cuatrista, 34-year-old has an overall sound that part of the full knowledge of tradition and virtuosity without limits to benefit from its curious and multidimensional ear.

== Discography ==
=== Albums ===
- Puerto Raices CD (2003)
- RICKY MARTIN : MTV UNPLUGGET CD-DVD (2006)

- RiCKY MARTIN LIVE : BLACK AND WHITE CD-DVD (2007)
- Ricky Martin : MAS CD(2012)
- Andrez Jimenez "El Jibaro" CD-DVD (2000-2015)
- HERENCIA MUSICAL: CD (2007)

- TOMMY TORRES: Tarde o Temprano CD(2008)

- DRACO ROSA: Amor Vincit Omnia CD(2009)
- DRACO ROSA : VIDA CD (2013)
- CHRISTIAN NIEVES Y RICARDO VILLANUEVA: A GUIRO PELAO CD (2009)

- CHRISTIAN NIEVES: MI MONTE CD (2011)

- PABLO ALBORAN : TERRAL(2014)
