= Maelo Ruiz =

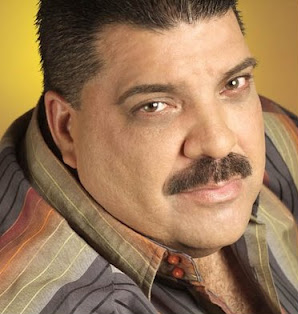

Background information
- Born: Ismael Ruiz Hernández; October 22, 1966 (age 59); New York City, U.S.
- Genres: Salsa
- Years active: 1980s–present
- Label: Codiscos
- Website: https://web.archive.org/web/20110817023543/http://www.maeloruizonline.com/

Ismael Ruiz Hernández (born October 22, 1966), better known as Maelo Ruiz, is a New York City-born Puerto Rican Salsa singer identified within the Salsa romántica genre.

Maelo Ruiz was born in New York City but at the age of 4 moved with his family to Puerto Rico where his parents were originally from. He started in music at the very young age of 16 when he began to sing in the "Escuela Libre de Música de Caguas". But it wasn't until the age of 19 when Maelo Ruiz really started his professional career in music when he became the first voice of Pedro Conga and his International Orchestra. He remained with Pedro Conga for 7 years, recording 4 albums with the band. His biggest hit with Pedro Conga was "No Te Quites La Ropa", which sold over 50,000 units earning the band their first gold record in Puerto Rico. Follow-up hits included "Atrévete", "Vicio" (gold record in Colombia), "Quiero Volver", "Si Supieras", "Te Quiero Amor" and "Me Niegas Tanto Amor". These were hits that made Maelo Ruiz a household name in Latin America. He also performed as a background singer for prominent salsero Willie González. His album Puro Corazón was nominated for the Latin Grammy Award for Best Salsa Album, but lost to El Cantante (soundtrack) by Marc Anthony.

On October 14, 2021, Maelo Ruiz was the featured singer on Norberto Vélez's YouTube channel titled "Sesiones Desde La Loma Ep. 21".

In 2016, it was reported that Ruiz was taking legal action against a fan named Karla Ankara Toledo, claiming that she "stole his sperm" from a sperm bank and used it to conceive twin girls.

== Discography ==
- Solo (1994)
- Experiencia (1996)
- Maelo Ruiz (1999)
- En Tiempo de Amor (2003)
- Regálame Una Noche (2005)
- Grandes Éxitos (2005)
- El Cantante del Amor (2006)
- Puro Corazón (2007)
- A Dos Épocas (2009)
- Lo Esencial de Maelo
