= Aguinaldo (music) =

Folk genre of Christmas music

Aguinaldo is a genre of Puerto Rican and Venezuelan traditional and cultural music, popular in several Latin American countries, based on Spanish Christmas carols or villancicos which is traditionally sung on Christmas itself or during the holiday season. Aguinaldo music is often performed by parrandas - a casual group of people, often family or friends, who merrily go from house to house singing along. The instruments used are the cuatro, maracas and drums. Some popular aguinaldos are Burrito Sabanero (Venezuela), El Asalto (Puerto Rico), Feliz Navidad (Puerto Rico), and De la Montaña Venimos (Puerto Rico).

== Venezuelan aguinaldo ==
In Venezuela, aguinaldo is a genre of Christmas music and generally have six verses. It is played by "parranderos" or "aguinalderos" that announce their arrival in song and seek to gain entry to the community houses to relate the story of the birth of Christ, and to share in the joy of the message of Peace on Earth and to all People of Good Will. Aguinaldos are played with typical instruments such as the cuatro (a small, four-string guitar), furruco, and maracas. Other instruments often used are violin, guitar, tambourine, mandolin, bandol, caja (a percussive box instrument), and marímbula (an Afro-Venezuelan instrument). In exchange for the entertainment, "parranderos" are traditionally given food and drink: hallacas, panettone, rum and "Ponche Crema" (a form of alcoholic eggnog). Aguinaldos are also played at Christmas church celebrations. The composer Vicente Emilio Sojo compiled and harmonized more than 100 anonimous agunaldos and other folk songs, achieving a significant preservation of the country's musical traditions.

== Puerto Rican aguinaldo ==
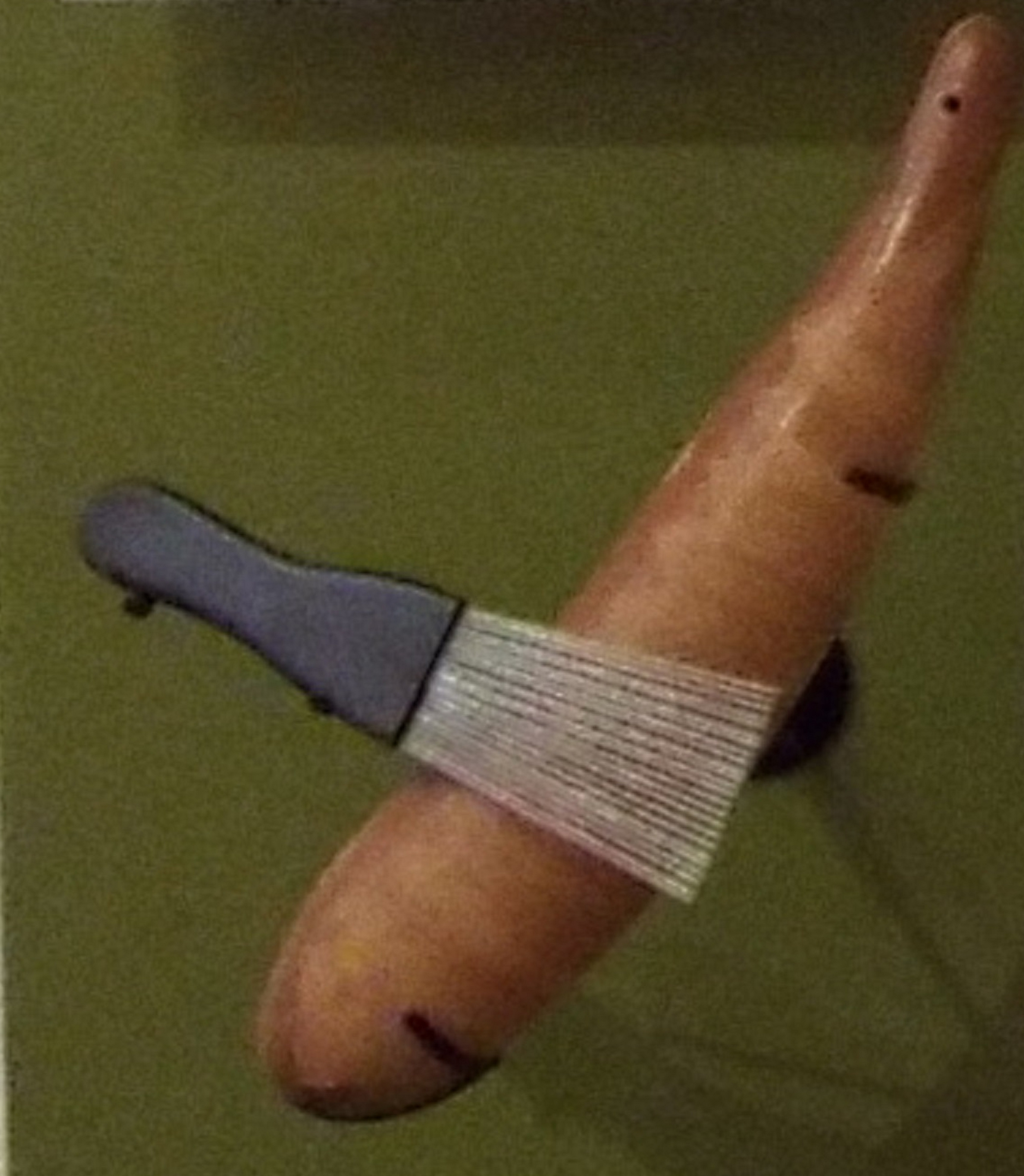
Puerto Rican Güiro

In Puerto Rico, the aguinaldo is a musical gift offered during the Christmas season and is a tradition inherited from the island's Spanish colonizers. As a musical gift, aguinaldos are mostly played by "parranderos" or "trullas" during the Christmas holidays. While parrandas, showing up at a residence late at night, with a group of Christmas carolers, is a practice that is slowly being lost in Puerto Rico, a Puerto Rican aguinaldos album debuted in the top 10 Billboard Tropical Albums in December 2019.

Originally, aguinaldos were "villancicos" with strong religious connotations, but soon evolved to "coplas" (quartets) and "decimas" (ten-verses compositions) about all kinds of everyday topics. Aguinaldos were played with typical instruments such as the bordonúa, a tiple, a cuatro, a carracho or güiro, a cowbell, barriles de bomba, an accordion, and maracas. With bordonua players becoming more difficult to find, the guitar became a staple accompanying the cuatro. Today, panderos (also known as "pleneras"), brass instruments and whatever makes noise, are used.

As a genre, the aguinaldo is played mostly on the radio on key Christmas holidays in Puerto Rico; the day before Christmas, Christmas Day, New Year's Eve, New Year's Day, the day before Three Kings Day, and on Three King's Day (January 6). Aguinaldos are also played at Christmas church celebrations.

In 1918, Puerto Rican Aguinaldo's and Décimas and other notes, as compiled by American linguist, John Alden Mason, and Aurelio M. Espinosa were published in the Journal of American Folklore.

== Trinidadian aguinaldo ==
Aguinaldo or Serenal is a music genre used in Parang (Parranda) a type of Christmas music that came to Trinidad and Tobago from Venezuela. Singers and instrumentalists (collectively known as "parranderos") travel from house to house in the community, often joined by friends and neighbours family, using whatever instruments are to hand. Popular parang instruments include the cuatro and maracas (locally known as chac-chacs).

== Philippine aguinaldo ==
In the Philippines, the word aguinaldo has come to refer instead to the gift—usually cash or coins—collected by small groups of children that go carolling, in a parallel to the financial practice of paying Christmas bonuses. A traditional instrument used is a makeshift tambourine made of several tansan (aluminium bottle caps) strung on some wire. Carollers solicit homeowners with the chant "Namamasko po!" (approx. "wassailing!"), and after singing wait to be rewarded with aguinaldo.

== See also ==
- Music of Puerto Rico
- Venezuelan music
- Trinidadian music
