= Barril de bomba =

Traditional drum used in bomba music of Puerto Rico

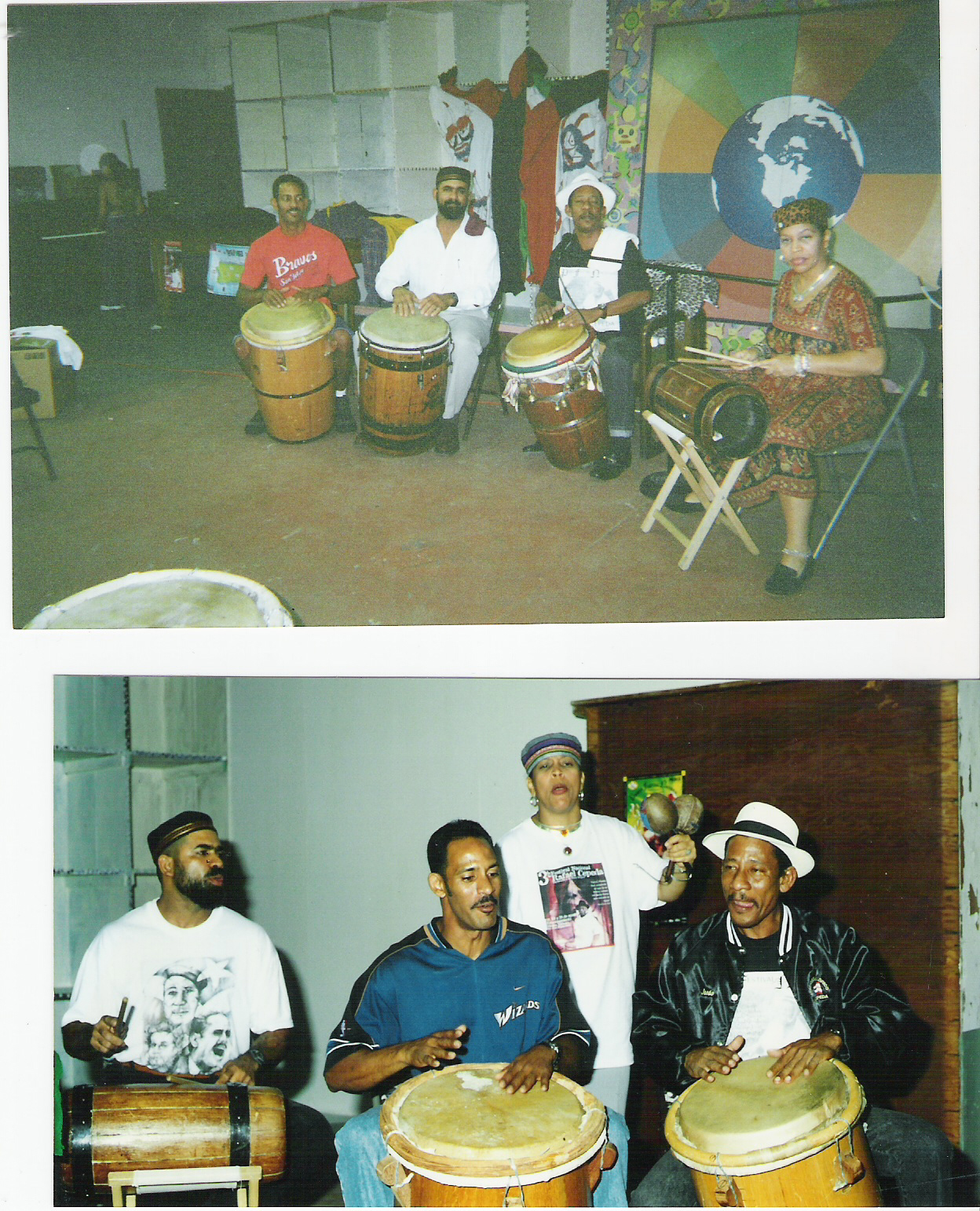
'Barriles de bomba' players

The barril de bomba is a traditional drum used in bomba music of Puerto Rico. The barriles de bomba are built from the wood of rum storage barrels and goatskin, adjusted with tourniquets, screws, cuñas or wedges. At least two drums are required to perform bomba music and dance: a Primo or subidor, the lead drum who follows the dancer, and the buleador, which keep a steady beat.

Additional instruments include the cuá, a hollow small wooden barrel which is struck with wooden sticks, and most commonly a maraca.

Cuá - wooden sticks are used on a wooden surface to draw a basic rhythmic pattern, similar to the buleador pattern. The wooden surface can be a lying barrel, a piece of hollowed tree or a bamboo, open at both ends.

Maraca - made from native fig, this singular maraca produces a sharp sound. Before this artefact, a marimba (güiro) was used in some areas of the island instead of the rattle. The maraca is a shaken idiophone instrument comprising a hollow spherical portion supported by a shaft that passes through or is attached to it. The interior is filled with small percussive elements, like small stones, seeds or peronia seeds, which produce sound when hit against the inner wall of the sphere.
