= Pandereta plenera =

Handheld frame drum

The pandereta plenera, pandero plenero or plenera, is a handheld frame drum typical of Puerto Rican music. A group of these drums is commonly used in traditional Puerto Rican plena music. There are three general sizes: primo or requinto (for solos and lead), segundo or seguidor, and tercero or bajo (for rhythm and bass), although sizes can vary. A fourth type is the pandereta punteador, also used for rhythm.

== See also ==
- Drum
- Percussion instrument
- Plena
