= Culture of Puerto Rico =

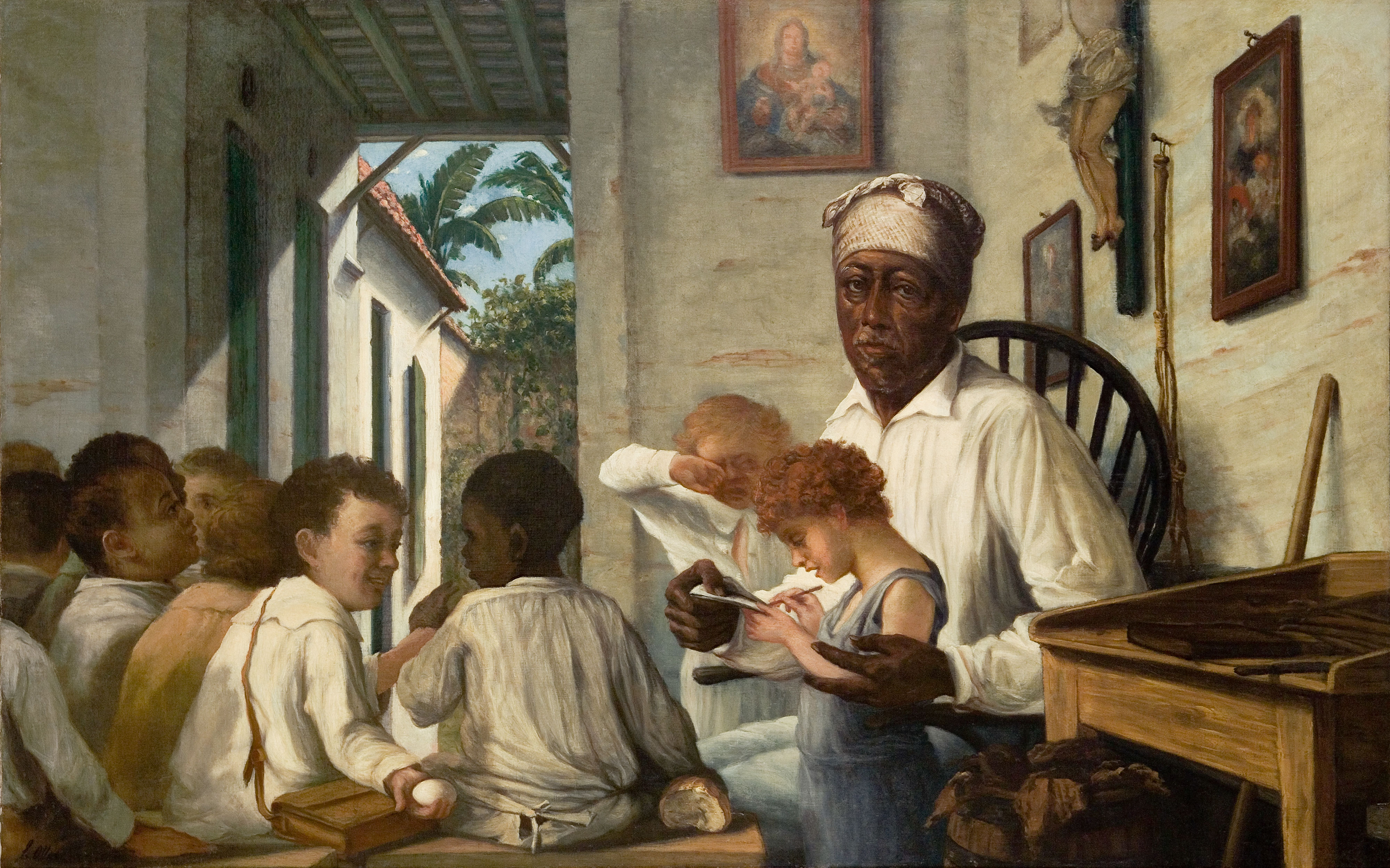
La escuela del maestro Rafael Cordero by Puerto Rican artist Francisco Oller.

The culture of Puerto Rico is the result of a number of both external and indigenous influences, both past and present. Modern cultural manifestations showcase the island's rich history and help create an identity that is uniquely Puerto Rican—a fusion of Taíno (Native American), Spanish, African, and North American influences.

== Influences ==
=== Taíno ===
Statue in Old San Juan, photographed by Carol M. Highsmith

A subgroup of the Arawakan aboriginals, a group of Native Americans in northeastern South America, inhabited the Greater Antilles, but Puerto Rico was inhabited predominantly by Tainos. At the time Juan Ponce de León took possession of the Island, there were about twenty Taino villages, called yucayeque. It is believed that Taíno settlements ranged from single families to groups of 3,000 people.

At their arrival the Spaniards expected the Taíno Indians to acknowledge the sovereignty of the king of Spain by payment of gold tribute, to work and supply provisions of food and to observe Christian ways. The Taínos rebelled, most notably in 1511, when several caciques (Indian leaders) conspired to oust the Spaniards. They were joined in this uprising by their traditional enemies, the Caribs. Their weapons, however, were no match against Spanish horses and firearms and the revolt was soon ended brutally by the Spanish forces of Governor Juan Ponce de León.

As a result, Taíno culture, language, and traditions were generally decimated, and vanished 20 years after Christopher Columbus arrived. Since the early 20th century, efforts have been made to revive and rebuild Taíno culture.

The Taínos, far more than the Caribs, contributed to the everyday life and language that evolved during the Spanish occupation. Taíno place names are still used for such towns as Utuado, Mayagüez, Caguas, and Humacao, among others.

Many Taíno implements and techniques were copied directly by the Europeans, including the bohio (straw hut) and the hamaca (hammock), the musical instrument known as the maracas, and the method of making cassava bread. Many Taino words persist in the Puerto Rican vocabulary of today. Names of plants, trees and fruits includes: maní, leren, ají, yuca, mamey, pajuil, pitajaya, cupey, tabonuco and ceiba. Names of fish, animals and birds include: mucaro, guaraguao, iguana, cobo, carey, jicotea, guabina, manati, buruquena and juey. As well as other objects and instruments: güiro, bohío, batey, caney, hamaca, nasa, petate, coy, barbacoa, batea, cabuya, casabe and canoa. Other words were passed not only into Spanish, but also into English, such as huracan (hurricane) and hamaca (hammock). Also, many Taíno superstitions and legends were adopted and adapted by the Spanish and still influence the Puerto Rican imagination.

=== Europe ===
The most profound European influence is that of Spain, the island's colonizer. There are also Italian and Sicilian influences, among others. Spanish influence is the most notable of all cultural influences in Puerto Rican culture. Spanish heritage has left an indelible mark on the island, and signs of this cultural exchange can be found everywhere, from the Colonial architecture and official language to the island's literature and local culinary styles. As far back as the 16th century, the Spanish built a series of massive defense structures to protect Old San Juan and its bay from other invaders. Parts of Old San Juan and La Fortaleza are now UNESCO World Heritage Sites.

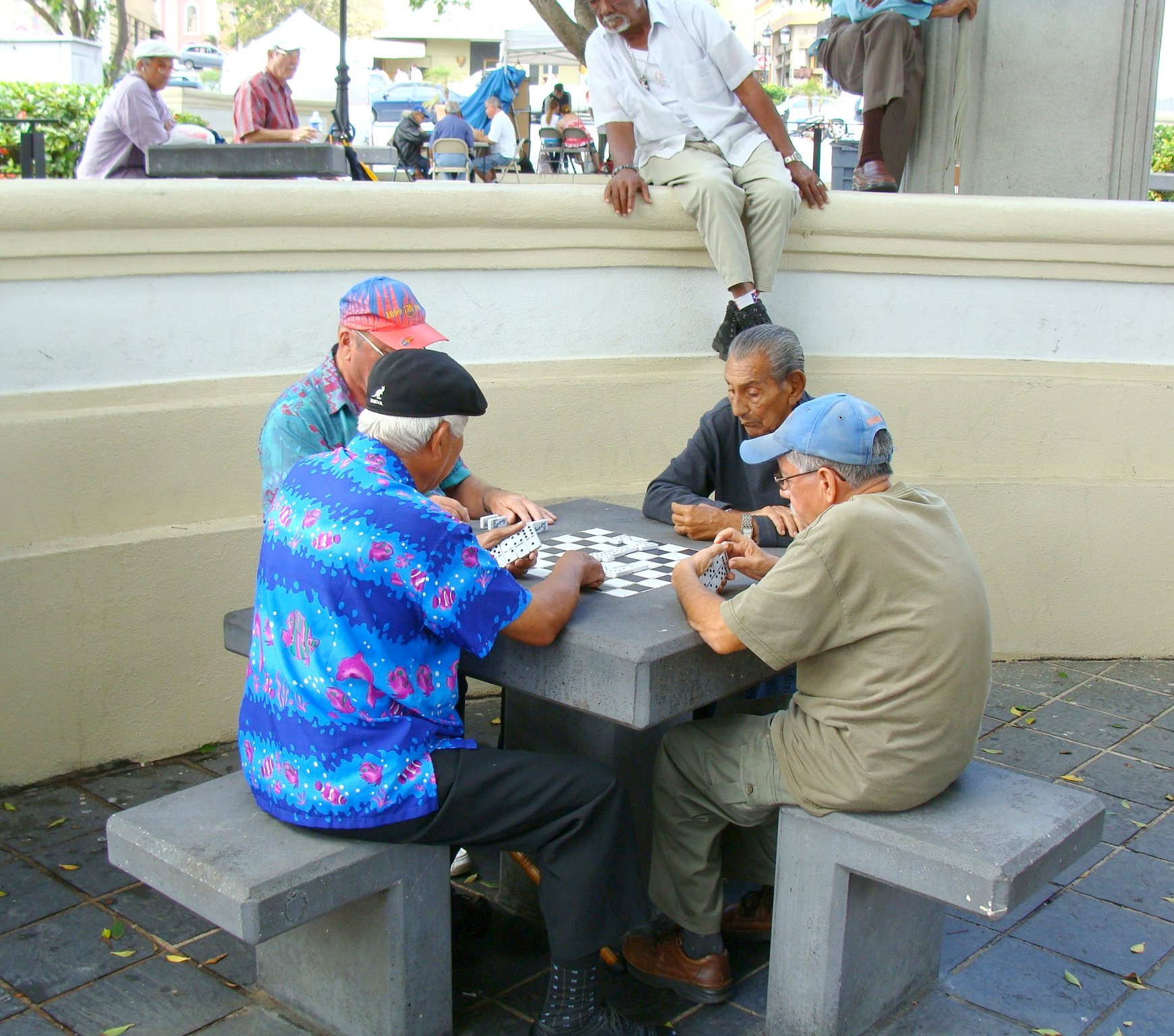
Four men playing dominoes in San Juan, Puerto Rico

The culture of European countries has also influenced the development of the performing arts on the island, especially in music. Many of the island's musical genres have their origins in the Spanish culture, which is responsible for such genres of music as decima, seis, danza, and mambo.

Rooster fighting is a sport that has been part of the Puerto Rican culture for centuries. In 1845, Manuel Alonso, in his book El Gíbaro, wrote that maybe a barrio could lack a church, but no barrio of Puerto Rico lacked a cockfighting venue. The sport was passed in families, from generation to generation. There are 71 official venues and hundreds of thousands of people attend events each year. In Daddy Yankee's video for Barrio Fino a cockfight can be seen. In December 2019, cockfighting again became illegal in Puerto Rico, but Governor Wanda Vázquez Garced asked for a reprieve stating the industry brings in $9 million each year and people employed in the industry would be left destitute.

=== Africa ===
With the introduction of slavery to the colony, the island experienced an influx of Africans who brought with them the cultural influences of their own tribes. These influences are evident in the fields of dance and music, such as la bomba, la plena, and most recently in reggaeton, which is an Afro-Caribbean based Puerto Rican genre, as well as influences in Puerto Rican Spanish, and Puerto Rican cuisine.

The presence of African diasporic religions, such as Santeria, is due to African influence. More subtle ties also exist, such as those that connect Puerto Rico's literary history with the rich African tradition of oral storytelling. Also, all Afro-Caribbean, Afro-Latino, and African American cultural influences from the United States, neighboring Caribbean islands, and Puerto Rico itself, are largely African in origin.

=== The Caribbean and Latin America ===
The shared African heritage of many Caribbean nations is reflected in cultural pursuits like dance, as well as in local culinary styles. Most regional influences are Latino and Afro-Caribbean. The neighboring islands that have been the most influenced by Puerto Rico's dance and music are Cuba, the Dominican Republic, and Jamaica. Panama has shared creating great passionate Spanish Reggae with its origins in Puerto Rico, the Spanish language version of Jamaican Reggae. Eventually reggaeton, a Puerto Rican break-off of original Spanish reggae, became very popular throughout Latin America, the Caribbean, the US and Spain.

Puerto Rican artists helped create Salsa music with Cuban artists, and also helped Dominican artists with the development of Merengue. Recent Haitian and Dominican immigration has been producing many new cultural influences. Significant cultural exchange has been evident between Puerto Rico and the US Virgin Islands, especially the islands of St. Croix, Vieques, and Culebra, such as Puerto Rican style Patois mixed with Spanish.

A number of Latin American countries have also exerted influence on Puerto Rico's cultural identity. In the filmmaking community, co-productions between Puerto Rico and other Latin American countries have created an exchange of ideas and influenced their film conventions. For instance, the Latin sense of humor and fantastical elements are evident in Puerto Rican films.

=== United States ===
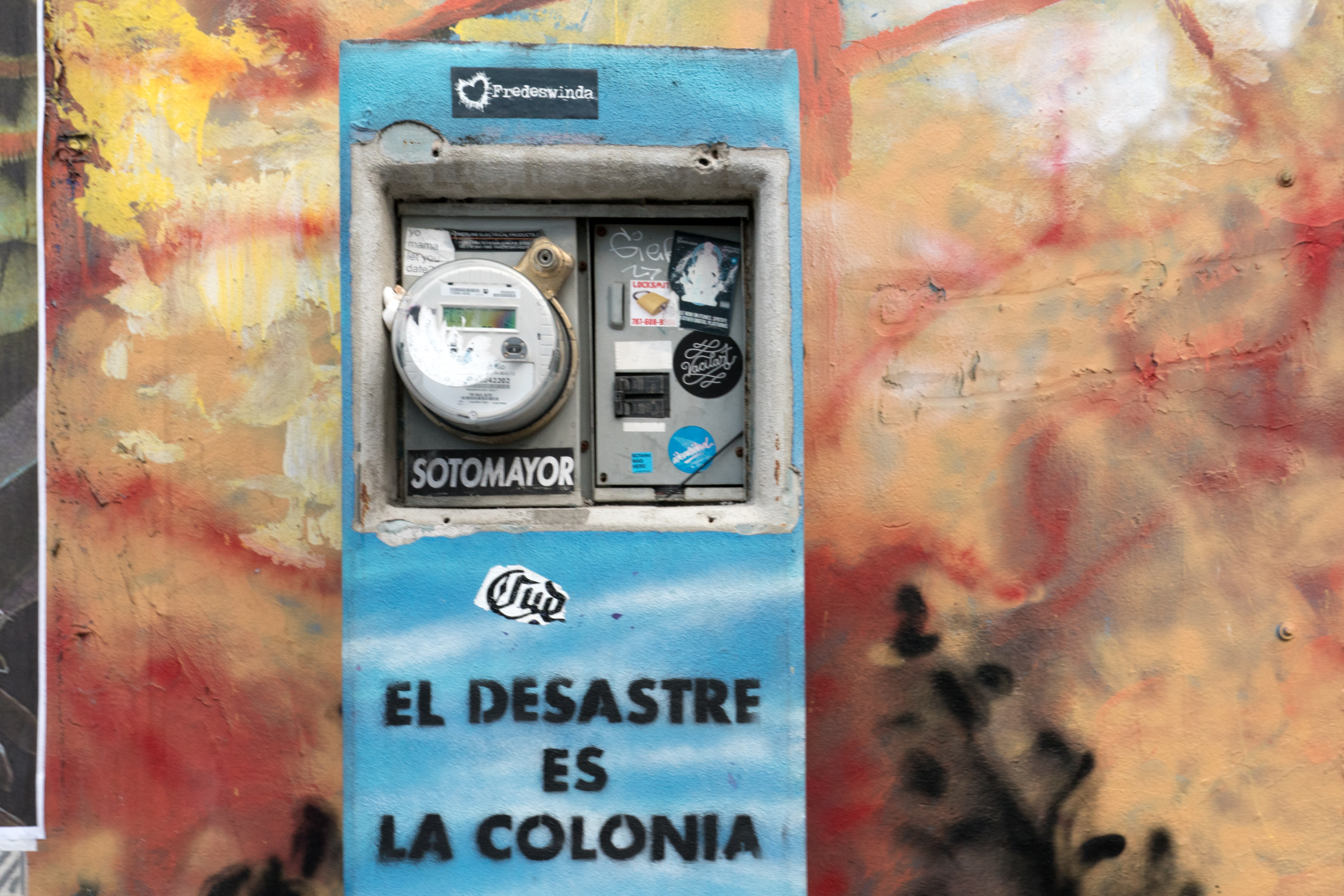
"El desastre es la colonia" (the disaster is the colony), words seen on light meter six months after Hurricane Maria

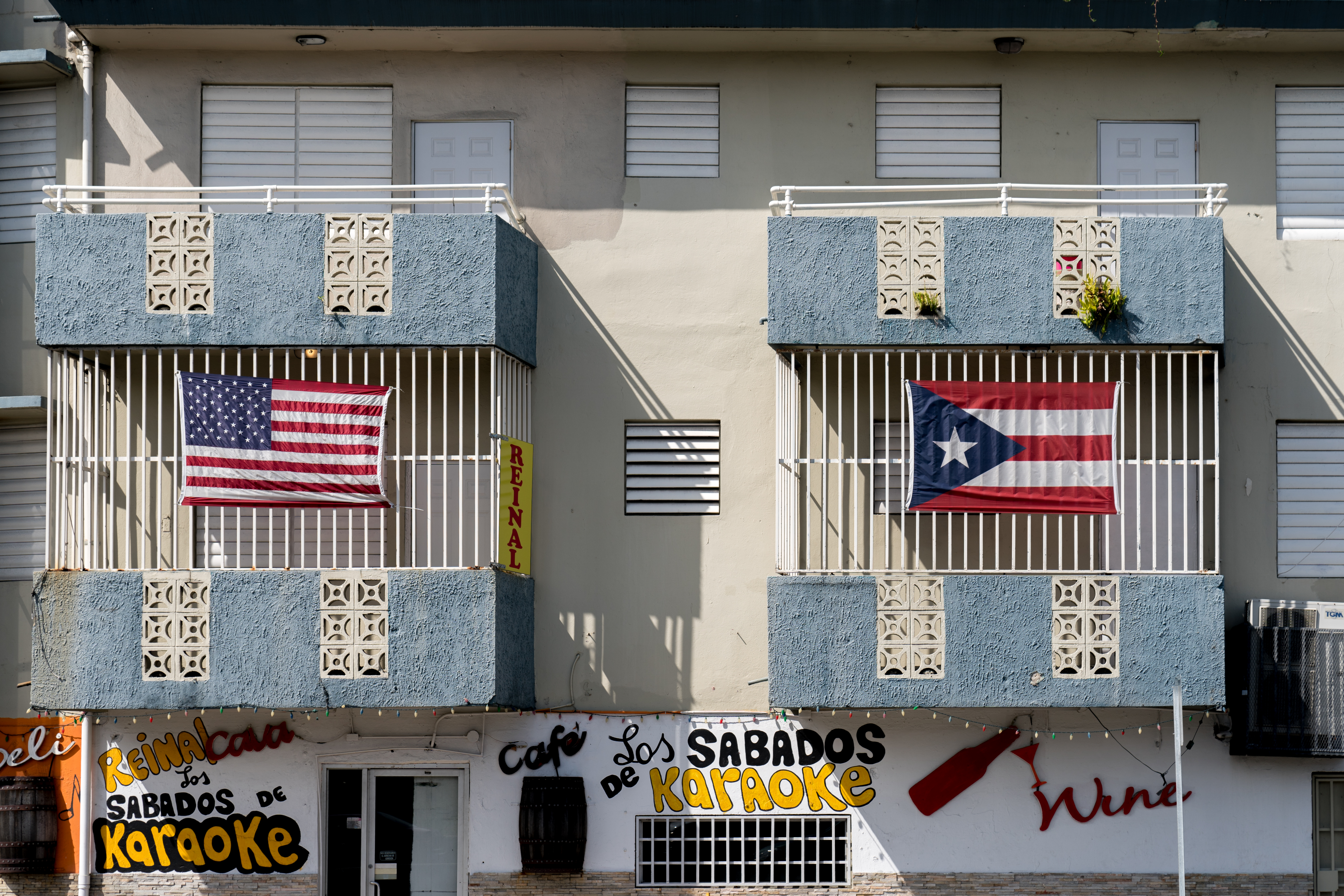
US and Puerto Rico flags on a building in Puerto Rico

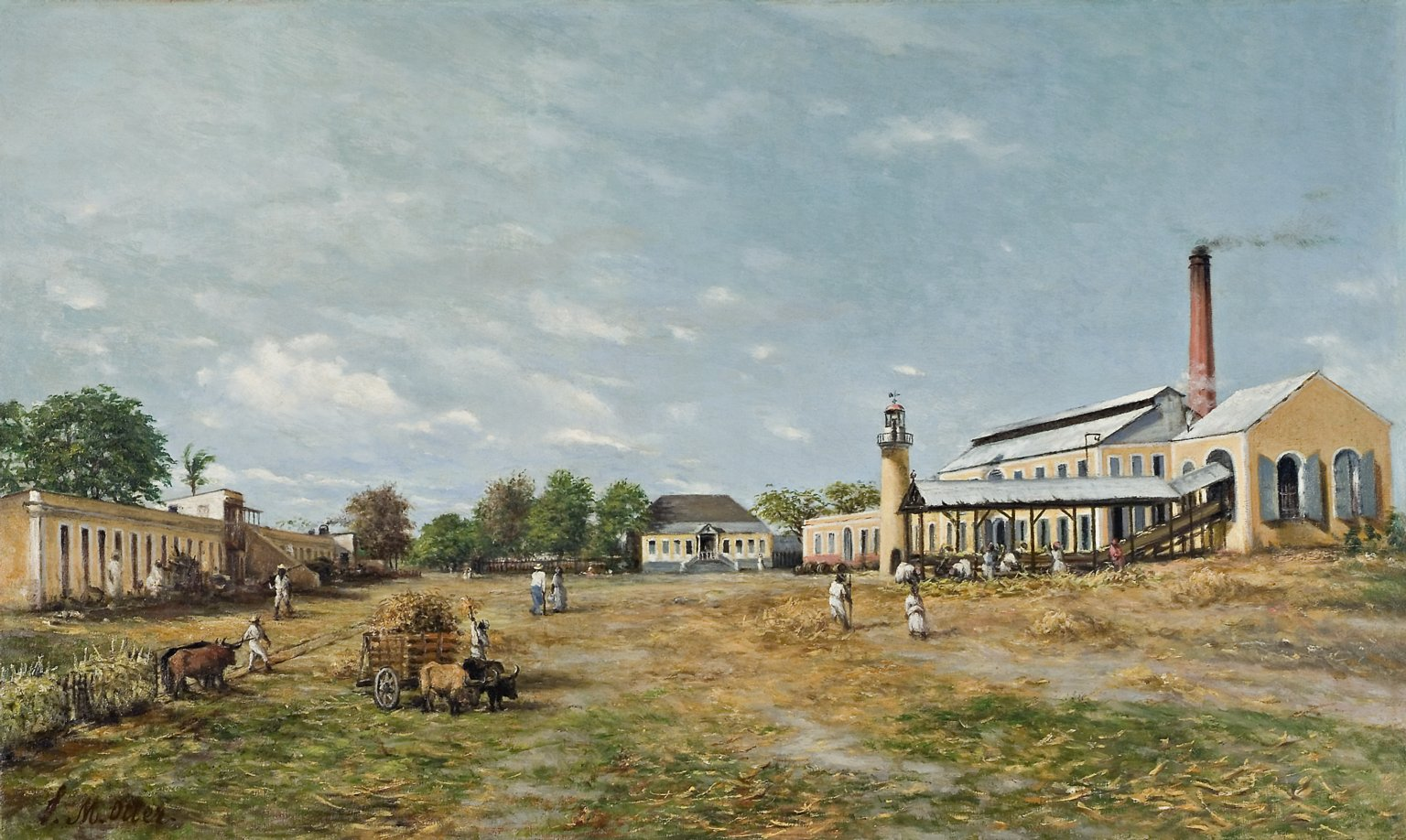
Hacienda La Fortuna, sugar mill complex in Puerto Rico painted by Francisco Oller in 1885.

Culturally, Puerto Rican sentiment for the U.S. tends to vary between emulation and opposition, a result of the complicated socio-political relationship between the two. Since establishment as an unincorporated territory of the United States in 1898, traditional economics, social structure, nationalism, and culture in Puerto Rico has been affected by Puerto Rico's relationship with the U.S.

Before the United States captured Puerto Rico from Spain in 1898, the colony was agriculture based. Most worked on sugar cane, tobacco, or coffee plantations. Through the beginning of the 20th century, Puerto Ricans remained agricultural. Operation Bootstrap, an operation of the United States and the Puerto Rico Economic Development Administration, began in 1942 and was put in place to transform Puerto Rico into an industrial colony. Government owned factories were built to shift development to industrial factory work and, eventually, education of the factory work force. One of the effects of the growth of Puerto Rican industry changed the outlook on familial social structure. The United States ideal of small, patriarchal families also impacted the contemporary Puerto Rican family structure in policy. In an attempt to demolish poverty in shantytowns, the Puerto Rico Housing Authority established public housing by example of United States policy. The public housing further disenfranchised the large multi-generation family by dividing nuclear families into public, single-family dwellings. Links to extended family are still an important aspect to the culture of Puerto Rican family structure, however, they have been significantly weakened.

The relationship between the United States and Puerto Rico makes national identity complicated. Puerto Ricans maintain United States citizenship while aligning with a uniquely Puerto Rican heritage. Although the island's culture is not heterogeneous, Puerto Rico establishes several binary oppositions to the United States: American identity versus Puerto Rican identity, English language versus Spanish language, Protestant versus Catholic, and British heritage versus Hispanic heritage.

Moreover, with the growing influence of the United States, some Puerto Ricans feel they are gradually losing their culture and identity, fearing a similar scenario to that of Hawaii. There, "the indigenous peoples were pushed aside, their culture was marginalized, except for a selling exoticism. The Americans arrived, just as they did here, with their Protestant religion, their good schools and their hospitals," according to author Magali García Ramis.

Donald Trump's executive order recognizing English as the official language of the American territory, has called into question the provision of services to non-English speakers in federal offices, such as Social Security, in the United States and in Puerto Rico, where Spanish is the official language, and common to the Associated Territory of the state Puerto Rico.

== Pursuits ==
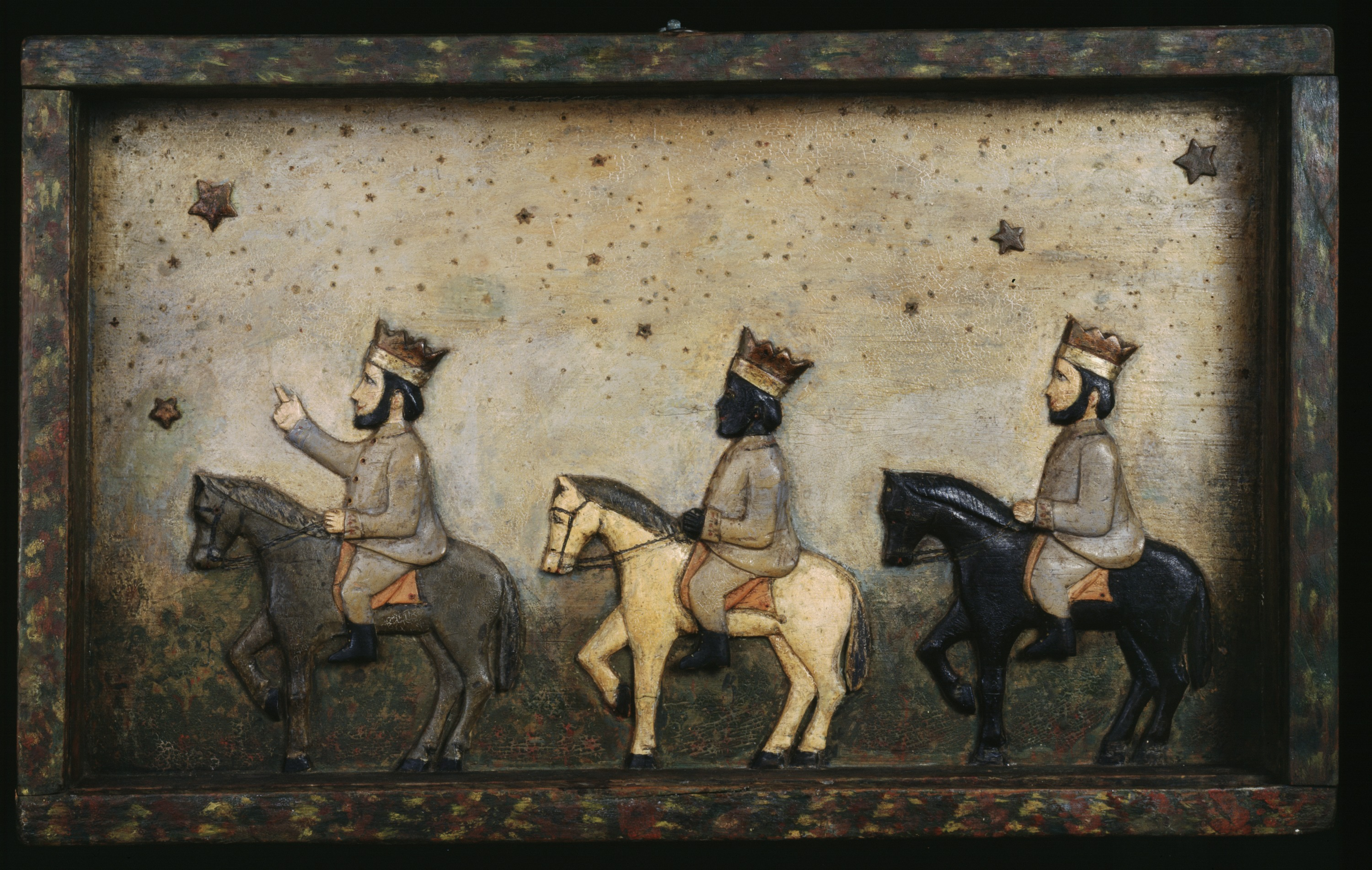
Los Reyes Magos painted by Hipolito Marte Martinez, "In Puerto Rico, Melchior is always represented with dark skin"

- Architecture of Puerto Rico – the island has a World Heritage Site, and many landmarks from the Pre-Columbian era to modernist architecture by Jose Firpi, Jonathan Marvel and Segundo Cardona.
- Art in Puerto Rico – Puerto Ricans have contributed a great deal to the field of visual arts, including its major museums, individual artists, and collectives.
- Cinema of Puerto Rico – the island's own film industry, as well as its role in international cinema.
- Cuisine of Puerto Rico is gaining greater renown outside the island for its traditional and fusion foods.
- Puerto Rican literature – poets, novelists, and playwrights, such as Julia de Burgos, Giannina Braschi, and Lin-Manual Miranda have helped Puerto Rico gain international acclaim.
- Music of Puerto Rico – music on the island blends diverse cultural influences. Performing arts such as dance are an integral part of cultural expression.
- Puerto Rican poetry—Composed in Spanish, Spanglish, or English, Puerto Rican poetry has made great contributions to Nuyorican, American, and slam poetry, and inspired many songwriters.
- Puerto Rican comic books
- Sports in Puerto Rico

== See also ==
- Cultural diversity in Puerto Rico
- Corsican immigration to Puerto Rico
- French immigration to Puerto Rico
- German immigration to Puerto Rico
- History of performing arts in Puerto Rico
- Irish immigration to Puerto Rico
- Spanish immigration to Puerto Rico
- List of Puerto Rican slang words and phrases
- African influence in Puerto Rican culture
- Puerto Rican people

General:

- Latin American culture
