= William R. Cumpiano =

Puerto Rican master guitarmaker

William Richard Cumpiano
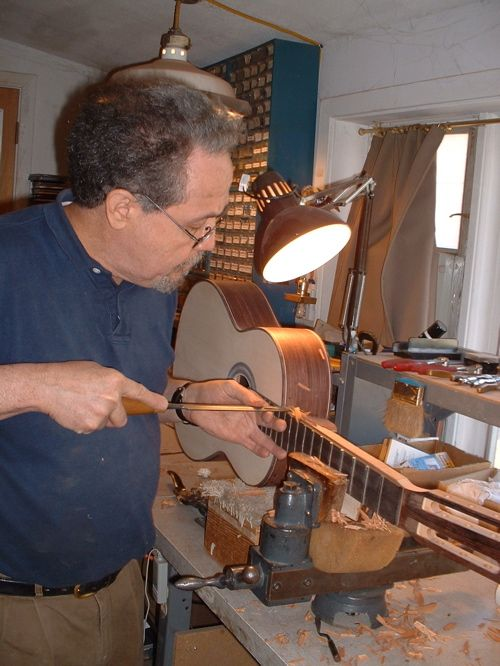
- William Cumpiano working on a classical guitar
- Born: April 30, 1945 (age 81); San Juan, Puerto Rico
- Occupations: Master guitarmaker, cultural researcher and educator
- Spouse: Jeanette A. Rodríguez

William Richard Cumpiano (born April 30, 1945) is a builder of stringed musical instruments and is known for his writing and teaching of the art of luthiery. He has been involved in the preservation and understanding of the fading musical and musical craft traditions of his native Puerto Rico. Cumpiano was instrumental in the development of the first feature-length documentary about the cuatro and its music, Our Cuatro: The Puerto Ricans and Stringed Instruments, Volumes 1 and 2.

== Early years ==
Cumpiano was born into a middle-class family in San Juan, Puerto Rico. His father was a native of the town of Rincón, Puerto Rico, and his mother from Boston, Massachusetts. He was raised in the capital of Puerto Rico where he received his primary and secondary education. On one occasion, Cumpiano wandered into an eatery next to his grade school which had a jukebox. He listened to Odilio González sing a décima with a guitar and a cuatro in the background. In Puerto Rico the type of music that Odilio González sang is known as "música jíbara", which is Puerto Rico's cultural equivalent of what in the United States is called country music. This early experience would eventually grow into his passion for Puerto Rican traditional instruments and singing.

Cumpiano attended the University of Puerto Rico High School in Río Piedras from 1959 to 1961 and St. John's Preparatory School in Santurce from 1961 until his graduation in 1962.

He wanted to study engineering, and in 1962 he moved to Medford, Massachusetts. There he enrolled at Tufts University where he discovered that he was more interested in studying art. In 1964, he moved to New York City and studied industrial design at Pratt Institute. He earned his B.Ind.D. (Bachelor of Industrial Design) in 1968, and went to work as a professional furniture designer.

== Master guitarmaker ==
Cumpiano met master guitarmaker Michael Gurian in 1969, and under Gurian's mentoring he began his training in the craft of guitarmaking. Cumpiano left his job and went to work in Gurian's guitarmaking shop in New Hampshire. In Gurian's guitarmaking shop he met and befriended Gurian's shop foreman, Michael Millard. Eventually Cumpiano and Millard established a shop together named "Froggy Bottom Guitars", where Cumpiano completed his training in guitarmaking. In 1974, Cumpiano left to establish his first private guitarmaking studio in Williamstown, Massachusetts. During the next twenty-five years he would move his workshop to North Adams, Leeds, and then to Amherst, Massachusetts. In 1997, Cumpiano moved his studio to Easthampton Road in Northampton where it currently resides.

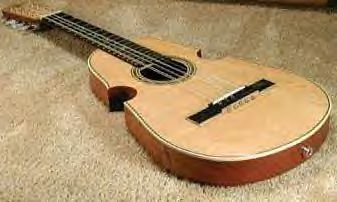
A "Thinline" Cumpiano Cuatro

Cumpiano's career spans almost forty years of hand-crafting all sorts of fretted stringed instruments from the North American, European and Latin American traditions. In 1985, his interests turned to the stringed instrument traditions of his native Puerto Rico and over the years Cumpiano became an authority on the craft and traditions that surround the "national instrument" of Puerto Rico, the ten-string cuatro. He has built numerous cuatros for musicians in the United States and also has crafted cuatro variants of his own design: he developed a "seis", or six course (twelve-string) cuatro that can be tuned in the same string intervals as a guitar. He also developed the "thinline" cuatro with a body depth of only two inches instead of the traditional three.

Among his customers are Arlo Guthrie, Michael Lorimer, John Abercrombie, Country Joe MacDonald, the Todd Rundgren band, June Millington, and Joel Zoss.

Cumpiano has taught his craft for over twenty years out of his studio, in schools, during workshops and lectures and through numerous publications. He has taught cuatro-making to young Puerto Rican artisans under grants originating from the National Endowment for the Arts (NEA) through various regional arts organizations.

== The Puerto Rican Cuatro Project ==
External audio
- You may watch a segment from "Nuestro Cuatro" on YouTube about the "Cuatro" with Tomás "Maso" Rivera

Cumpiano met Juan Sotomayor, a prize-winning photographer who worked on the New York Times staff. They discovered that there was no serious effort being expended at the University of Puerto Rico to study or research the origins and history, the corpus, of the jíbaro musical and musical craft traditions. They decided to set out to discover the story of Puerto Rico's traditional stringed instruments and later the story of Puerto Rico's traditional music.

In 1992, he co-founded The Puerto Rican Cuatro Project with Sotomayor and Wilfredo Echevarría, an expert in media communications.

The Puerto Rican Cuatro Project is a non-profit organization dedicated to fostering the traditions that surround the national instrument of Puerto Rico, by means of gathering, promoting and preserving its cultural memories of Puerto Rican musical traditions, folkloric stringed instruments and musicians. The Cuatro Project is also dedicated to promoting and preserving the Puerto Rican décima verse form and the traditional song as created by its greatest troubadours, living and past.

Cumpiano, who is also a founding board member and president of the Association of Stringed Instrument Artisans (ASIA), has lectured about his skills at conventions of the Guild of American Luthiers (GAL). He has received the recognition of various institutes, among them the American Institute of Architects and the Smithsonian Institution. He is also the co-recipient of a 1993 U.S. Patent for the compression-molded carbon fibre composite guitar soundboard.

== Written work and documentaries ==
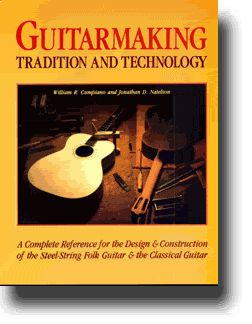
GUITARMAKING

Cumpiano co-authored, with Jonathon Natelson, the world's leading guitar-making textbook, GUITARMAKING: Tradition and Technology, a complete reference for the design and construction of the steel string folk guitar and the classical guitar, which has been acclaimed as the principal textbook in his field and considered by many as the Bible of guitarmaking.

In 1998, Cumpiano and his colleagues wrote, directed and produced Un Canto en Otra Montaña: Música Puertorriqueña en Hawaii ('A Song [Heard] on Another Mountain: Puerto Rican Music in Hawaii'), a short-feature video documentary on the music and social history of the century-old Puerto Rican diaspora in Hawaii.

Cumpiano, together with Sotomayor and Echevarría, wrote, directed and produced two DVD documentaries for The Cuatro Project, OUR CUATRO Vol.1, the first feature-length documentary about the cuatro and its music, and OUR CUATRO Vol. 2: A Historic Concert. Cumpiano and cultural researcher David Morales produced another DVD documentary THE DÉCIMA BORINQUEÑA: An Ancient Poetic Singing Tradition, directed by Myriam Fuentes. The proceeds of these recordings were to be used for the research and documentation activities of the Puerto Rican Cuatro Project.

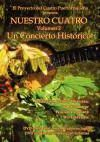
OUR CUATRO Vol. 2

- Nuestro Cuatro: Volumen 1, The Puerto Ricans and their stringed instruments. An unprecedented documentary that reveals the emotional story of the development and the history of the music and stringed instruments traditions of Puerto Rico.
- Nuestro Cuatro: Volumen 2, Un Concierto Histórico/A Historical Concert. This is the conclusion of the video documentary Nuestro Cuatro, a cultural and musical history of the Puerto Rican cuatro and Puerto Rico's stringed instruments.
- La Décima Borinqueña/The Décima Borinqueña: An Ancient Poetic Song Tradition. The tradition of the décima of the Puerto Rican jíbaros and its singing troubadours can be traced back to popular poetic forms of the Island's colonial past. In them, one can trace the medieval Spanish and Moorish roots of the trovador.

In 2001 Cumpiano also co-produced and co-directed the documentary Construyendo Cuatros ('Making Cuatros'), which comprises visits with two of Puerto Rico's most respected cuatro makers, showing them at work, the sequence of constructing a cuatro, and their impressions of their craft and the future prospects for the instrument.

== Associations ==
Cumpiano has been a member of the following associations:

- 1988–1996: Association of Stringed Instrument Artisans (ASIA). Co-founder, board president, and board member of international trade association of East Coast luthiers.
- 1993–1998: FibreAcoustics. Partner in start-up company to market new materials for the musical instrument industry.
- 1980–1994: Rosewood Press. Partner, publisher of guitar-making textbook.
- 1990–1993: Artists in Resonance. Co-founder of instrument maker's collaborative consisting of three guitarmakers, one drum maker and one harp maker, in Hadley, Massachusetts.
- 1995–1997: Leeds Guitarmaker's School. Co-founder, instrument-making school in Northampton, Massachusetts.
- 1992 to present: Co-founder, Puerto Rican Cuatro Project.

== Awards and exhibits ==
Among Cumpiano's awards and exhibitions are the following:

Awards:

- 1973: "Honor Award of Merit for Excellence in Workmanship". Given by the American Institute of Architects, New Hampshire Chapter.
- 1997: "For his work in preserving the culture of Puerto Rico through the making of traditional string instruments and undertaking the task of teaching its art and origins to others.". Plaque given at awards banquet of the University of Massachusetts, Amherst.
- 2000: Received award and tribute for "Outstanding service to the Western Massachusetts Latino community" from the Latino Scholarship Association, Western Massachusetts region.

Exhibits:

- 1978: Smithsonian Institution, Washington, D.C.
  Request for display of a Cumpiano twelve-string guitar in national show, "The Harmonious Craft".
- 1998: Smithsonian Institution, Washington, D.C.
  Display of instruments and research, along with student work, to curators of the National Museum of American History.
- 2001: American Crafts Museum, New York, New York
  Display of instruments for major show, "Objects for Use: Handmade by Design".

== Personal life ==
Cumpiano is married to Jeanette Rodríguez and has a stepson. He continues to run his shop and is active with The Puerto Rican Cuatro Project. He shares his Northampton studio with a partner of many years, the master luthier Harry Becker; they call their studio Becker and Cumpiano Stringed Instruments.

He has been featured in many magazines and he has written articles which have been featured in the following publications: Journal of Guitar Acoustics, Frets magazine, Guitar Player Magazine, Fine Woodworking Magazine, Stringed Instrument Craftsman, Acoustic Guitar, Guitarmaker, the journal of the Association of Stringed Instrument Artisans (ASIA), American Luthierie, the journal of the Guild of American Luthiers (GAL) and is the author of "Manuel Velázquez, guitarrero", an article included in the Houghton Mifflin Spanish language reader "Portales" (published in 1997). Cumpiano is writer/consultant for the Question & Answer column of Acoustic Guitar.

Cumpiano is putting the finishing touches on the manuscript of The Cuatro Project, which he and his comrades began in order to trace the roots and evolution of Puerto Rican traditional stringed instruments. He has been active giving community instrument-making workshops in Chicago, Massachusetts and Puerto Rico.

== See also ==
- List of Puerto Ricans
- Puerto Rican scientists and inventors
