= Jíbaro (Puerto Rico) =

Puerto Rican self-subsistence farmer

- Monumento al Jíbaro Puertorriqueño dedicated to the jíbaro, in Salinas, Puerto Rico
- Occupations: Self-subsistence farmers, agricultural land tenants, sharecroppers, fieldworkers

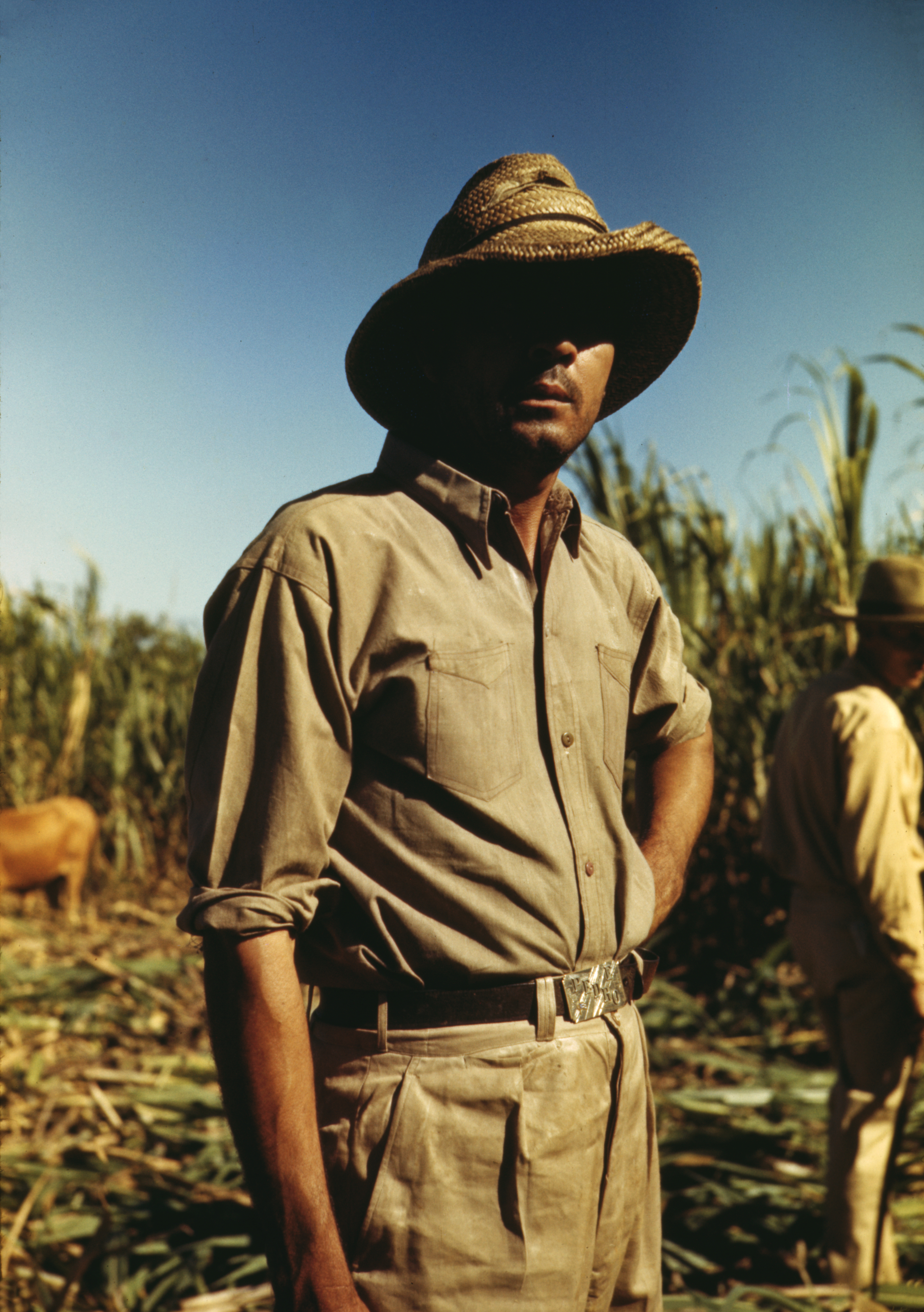
Puerto Rican jíbaro in a sugar-cane field during harvest, ca. 1941

Jíbaro (Spanish: [ˈxiβaɾo]) is a word used in Puerto Rico to refer to the countryside people who farm the land in a traditional way. The jíbaro is a self-subsistence farmer, and an iconic reflection of the Puerto Rican people. Traditional jíbaros were also farmer-salesmen who would grow enough crops to sell in the towns near their farms to purchase the necessities for their families, such as clothing.

In contemporary times, both white-collar and blue-collar Puerto Ricans are identifying themselves as jíbaros in a proud connection with their Puerto Rican history and culture in general.

== Historical context ==
As early as 1820, Miguel Cabrera identified many of the jíbaros' ideas and characteristics in his set of poems known as The Jibaro's Verses. Then, some 80 years later, in his 1898 book Cuba and Porto Rico, Robert Thomas Hill listed jíbaros as one of four socio-economic classes he perceived existed in Puerto Rico at the time: "The native people, as a whole, may be divided into four classes: the better class of Creoles, who call themselves Spaniards; the lower class of white peasantry, known as gibaros; the colored people, or mestizos; and the blacks."

Under Operation Bootstrap, in the middle of the twentieth century, Puerto Rico experienced an island-wide shift from an agrarian to an industrial society. Industries incorporated cheap labor, which led to the migration of many jíbaros from the mountain towns to the larger urban areas.

Jíbaros had a significant impact on the culture, political life, and language of Puerto Rico. Jíbaros were viewed differently by different Puerto Ricans.

In the political arena, when Luis Muñoz Marín ran for office, he often invoked the jíbaro as a means of uniting the working class of Puerto Rico under a populist party. To his own political gain, he sought to represent them as possessing ideals of hard-working Puerto Ricans. Muñoz Marín also adopted as the symbol of his party the silhouette of a Puerto Rican farmer with a pava, the straw hat that field laborers often wore. It served to bolster their image as that of a proud people who worked and toiled the land to earn an honest living. Simultaneously, Muñoz Marín developed as his party's motto the phrase "Pan, Tierra, Libertad" (Bread, Land, Liberty). Muñoz Marín himself, in an attempt to court the votes of the large segment of the electorate represented by the jíbaro population, at times dressed like his portrayals of the Jíbaro. By idealizing the Jíbaro, Luis Muñoz Marín was also able to captivate the attention and goodwill of much of the cultural elite of Puerto Rico because many of them viewed Jíbaros as the "essence of the Puerto Rican soul". His campaign, in effect, portrayed the jibaro through a lens of whiteness, much like Manuel A. Alonso had done before.

In 1941, Oscar Colón Delgado created Jíbaro Negro (black jíbaro) which represents a dark-skinned "jíbaro farmer".

Andrés Jiménez, "el Jíbaro", a Puerto Rican troubadour, would work on changing that perception with his song describing "El Puertorriqueño" as having a dark skin tone.

== Social, family and work aspects ==
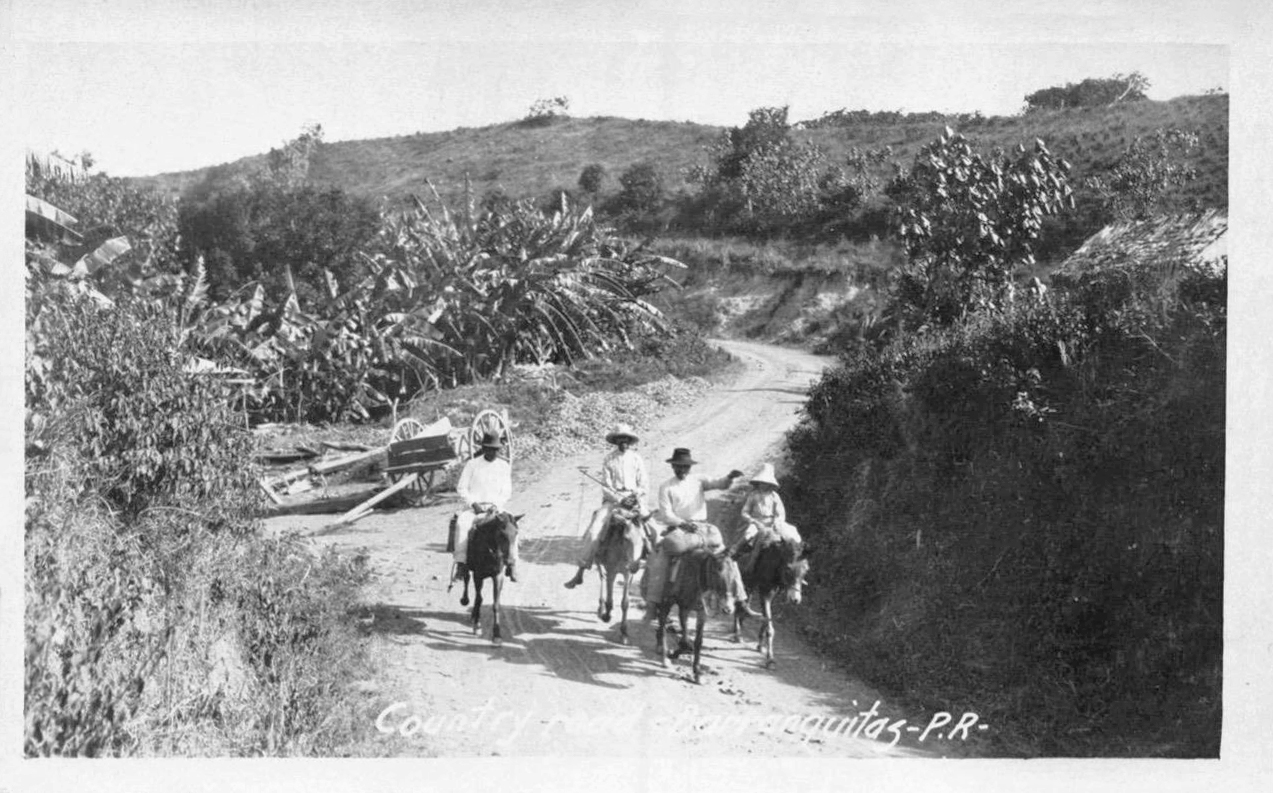
Postcard of jíbaros on horseback, traveling through a country road in Barranquitas (c. 1915)

The jíbaro values and way of life are oftentimes associated with the rich heritage and positive culture of Puerto Rico, as well as with the authenticity, resourcefulness and craftsmanship of the Puerto Rican people. These values and way of life include a sense of community, family, and hospitality. From young, children were taught to contribute to the family by, for example, assisting with cleaning and cooking family meals, and for older children, by ironing their own school clothes and polishing their own shoes. Some children were encouraged to look for ways to make money in order to buy anything that was not deemed a “need”. The values taught included respect for hard work, the importance of being resourceful, and an understanding of the values of unity, determination and integrity. A 1930 Brookings Institution report on Puerto Rico stated, "In spite of his fatalism the jíbaro is kindly, friendly and courteous, and hospitable to the last degree. He will ask you in to sit on his doorstep, and while you rest will hurry to boil you a cup of black coffee."

Here is how J. T. O'Neil described the 1850s jibaro in his 1855 book "The Spanish West Indies: Cuba and Porto Rico: geographical, political, and industrial":

The poor tenant of a hut built entirely of the palm-tree, and bound together with the strong and pliable bejuco, whose only habiliments are a check shirt, osnaburgs pantaloons, straw hat and an innocent machete strapped to his waist; who spends most of his time in his hammock smoking and playing on the triple (a small guitar), doing nothing, or sleeping; divested of care for the future by the present possession of a few coffee and plantain trees, a cow, a and the indispensable horse, and anticipating the pleasures of the next holiday cock-fight or dance, will extend the most cordial and polite welcome to the benighted traveler, set before him the best of his plantains, milk, and cheese; relinquish to him his rustic bed; unsaddle and feed his horse, which at break of day he will have in readiness, and dismiss his guest with a vaya usted con Dios, refusing with a gesture of pride or offended delicacy all proffer of payment.

== Music ==
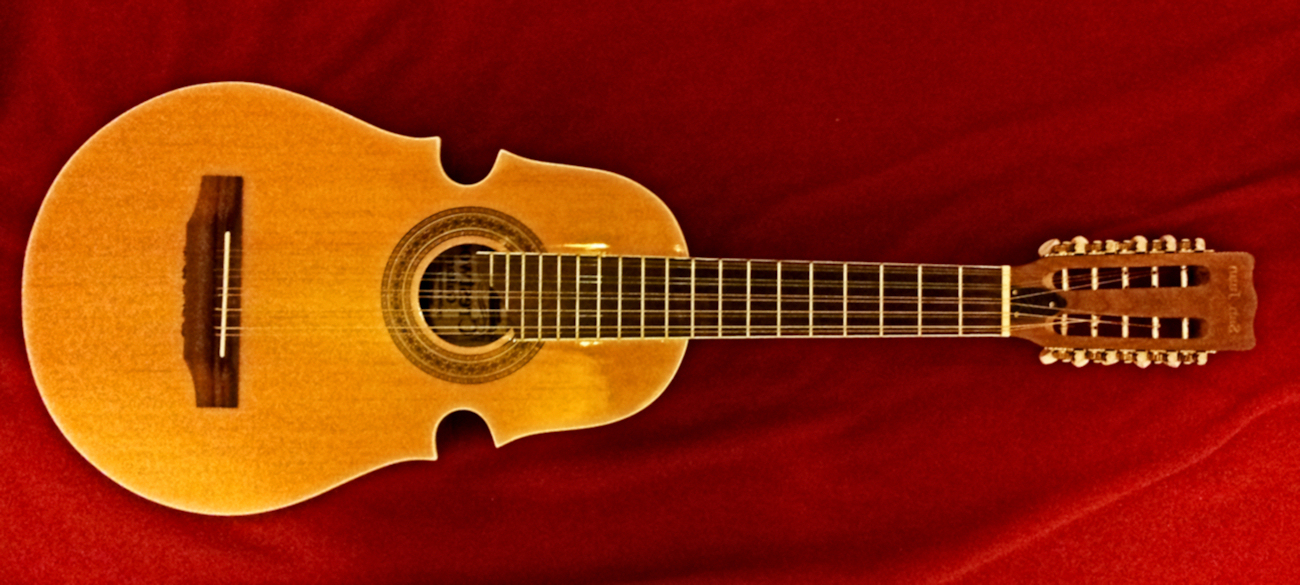
The Puerto Rican cuatro, a staple of jibaro music

Jíbaro culture is also characterized by its own typical Puerto Rican folk music, commonly termed "jíbaro music". "Jíbaro music and dance was the principal musical expression of the humble and hardworking mountain people who worked the coffee plantations and inland farms of Puerto Rico." This genre of music goes by different names, e.g., typical music, mountain music, peasant music, Puerto Rican hillbilly music, or jibaro music. Ramito is said to be the greatest proponent and interpreter of the jíbaro music. Odilio González, a singer of jíbaro music and originally from the mountain town of Lares, adopted the stage name of "El Jíbarito de Lares" (the Jíbarito from Lares), and recorded many LPs with his stage name proudly plastered prominently on their covers. Also very famous for their culture is the characteristic, improvised singing style and a typical refrain in the traditional folk music of Puerto Rico, often sung by Jíbaros called "Lelolai".

Jíbaro music is characterized by the use of the cuatro, its central instrument, guitar, and güiro. Maracas, bongos, and at times congas and cowbells, are also commonly used in addition to the three base instruments. There are three (Note: The "Proyecto El Cuatro" categorizes jíbaro music into four sub-genres: Décima, Seis, Aguinaldo, and Villancico. (See: El Proyecto del Cuatro, "Música" Section, at http://cuatro-pr.org/es/node/14 .)) sub-genres of jíbaro music: seis (introduced by Spanish colonizers), aguinaldo (traditional Christmas songs), and corridos. At present, música jíbara is most commonly heard during the Christmas season, but it is also played at weddings, birthdays, and at fiestas patronales throughout the year.

External audio
- You may listen to Jibaro Music at "Jibaro Radio" Here.

== Food ==
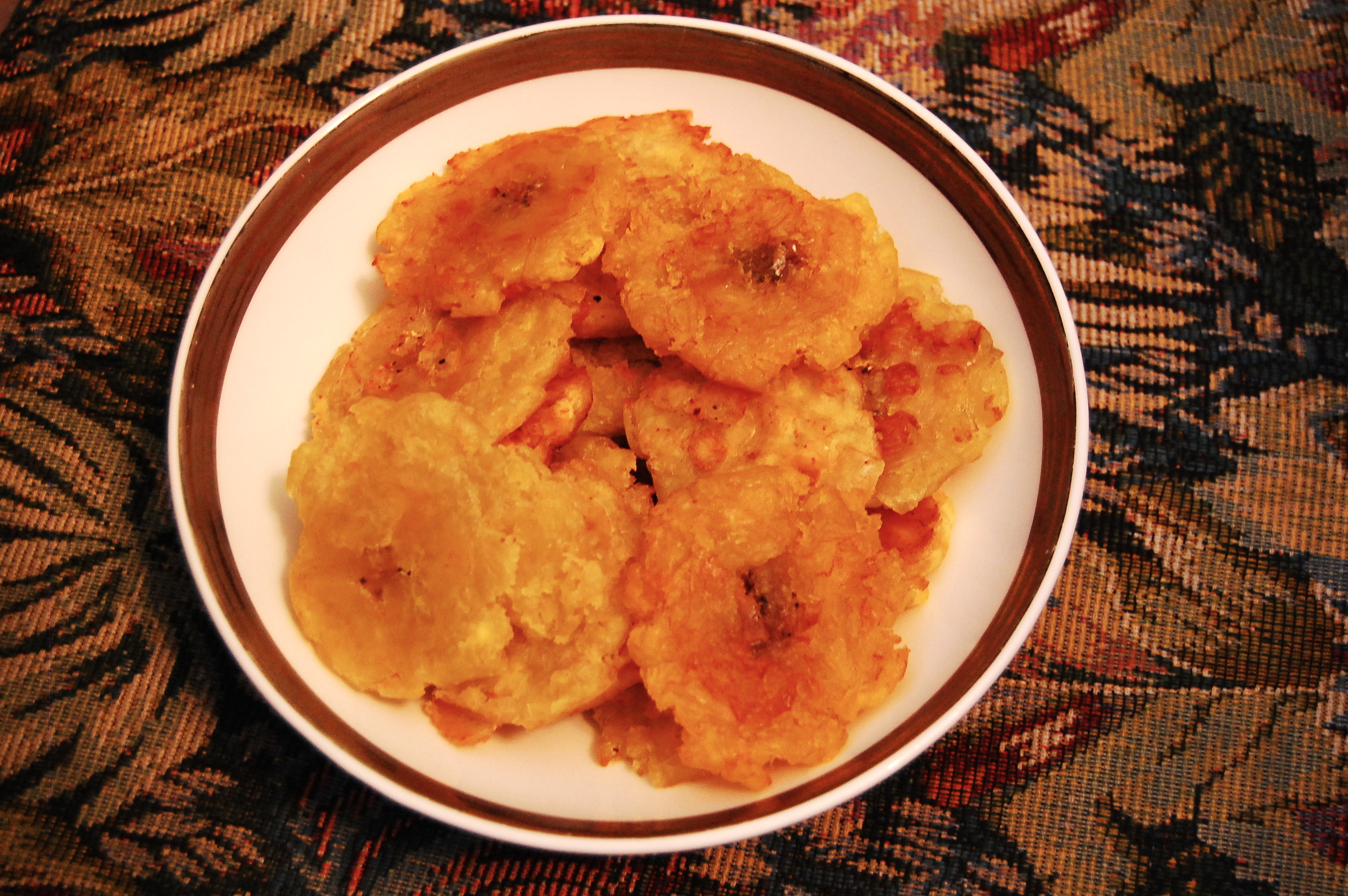
The traditional jibaro tostones on a contemporary ceramic dish

Plantains were the jibaro's "daily bread", and its mature fruit could serve as bread and the unripe fruit could be eaten roasted or baked. Many other foods are derived from plantains, including today's mofongo, maduros, and tostones, and plantains are also a base ingredient in pasteles.

Much of what is commonly considered authentic Puerto Rican food today actually had its roots in the foods typically prepared and consumed by the jíbaro Puerto Rican of the mountain countryside. "mountains in the countryside, authentic food and jíbaro music go perfectly together." The jíbaro mode of preparation also differed from how today's authentic Puerto Rican foods are prepared, as jíbaros prepared their food making regular use of stone stoves and rod-grilled (known as a la varita).

Some of the more common traditional dishes are asopao (a thick soup of rice and chicken), pasteles and mofongo. Some jíbaro songs tell of jíbaros consuming "viandas and bacalao" as one of their daily staples. (Note: viandas are a generic name for starchy root vegetables, including ñame, yautía, batata, yuca, malanga, and the Puerto Rican apio, all locally grown in the mountain regions of the Island) When jibaros settled on coastal town, some variations of their original foods developed, for example, asopao was then also made with seafood instead of chicken. Plantain, a common cultivar in the jíbaro residential fincas (farms), was the basis of various dishes or side dishes, such as tostones.

== Language ==
An 1887 document titled "Manifestaciones del elemento español de Puerto Rico con motivo de los sucesos de Juana Diaz, Puerto Rico 1887" (Instances of the Spanish element in Puerto Rico as it relates to the events in Juana Diaz, Puerto Rico 1887), speaks of the jíbaro language when it states "...'Los Secos' querían matar a todos los peninsulares y que ese [Celestino Aponte, representative of the Republic of Puerto Rico in Aibonito] ha recogido un documento escrito en jíbaro que no ha sido posible desifrar. (...'Los Secos' sought to kill all the Peninsulares and that him [Celestino Aponte, representative of the Republic of Puerto Rico in Aibonito] has picked up a document written in jíbaro which has not been possible to decipher.)

== Clothing ==
Jose A. Mari Mut said the traditional clothing of jíbaro men consisted of a long-sleeved white shirt and white pants, a fringe-less hat, and no shoes. According to him, the jíbaro woman ("jíbara") would also usually dress in white with a long shirt, shoulders and neck often covered, and would sometimes wear a hat or a bandana as a hair cover. She, too, would wear no shoes. The custom of not wearing shoes was not associated with poverty. Many instances of jíbaros were documented by American photographer Walter B. Townsend—both in writing and via his photographs—who were adequately dressed but wearing no shoes. The custom is thus attributed to comfort and convenience. Young jíbaro toddler boys would oftentimes be seen at their home naked, even while the jíbaro family hosted visitors. But the notion that this custom was also true for girls, or that jíbaro boys went to school naked, was debunked by over 3,000 pictures that Townsend took throughout Puerto Rico in 1900.

== Entertainment ==
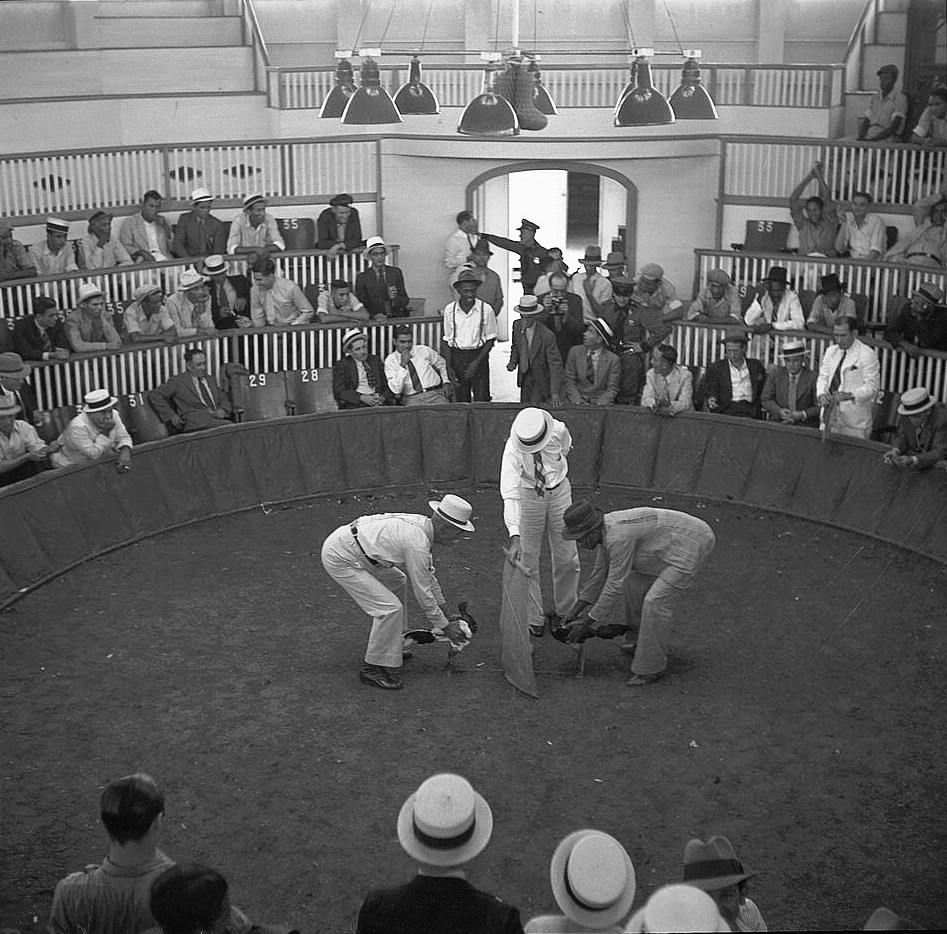
A cockfighting club in Puerto Rico in 1937

Cock-fighting was prevalent as the most common form of social entertainment among the jíbaro population. The pastime was performed mostly on Sunday afternoons, but saint days, feast days, or any other festive holidays would bring out particularly huge crowds to the event. Every town in Puerto Rico would have at least one cock-fighting pit. The upper classes of society would sometimes come to one of these events, but would not ordinarily be participants. Unlike the birds in the United States which were outfitted with metal razor-sharp blades strapped to their legs, Puerto Rico jíbaros fought their cocks with their own gaffs.

== Occupations ==
Many jíbaros were self-subsistence farmers, but there were also those who owned no land but instead worked as agricultural land tenants, sharecroppers, and fieldworkers of various types. Some of those that did own their own plot of land were also farmer-salesmen who would grow enough crops to sell in the towns near their farms. Their crops would consist of whatever the land would grow, including bananas, plantains, avocados, ñames, yautías, batatas, yucas, malangas, and apio. However, hens, eggs, and charcoal were also traded.

== Political participation ==
The jibaros were also the main component of many of the struggles against the ruling colonial powers in the Island. They were the primary driving force in revolutions in Puerto Rico against the Spaniards, including the well-known 1868 Grito de Lares (Cry of Lares). Even after that revolution failed, jíbaros were credited with keeping the spirit of Puerto Rican freedom alive through other revolts including the 1897 Intentona de Yauco. After the Americans became the new colonial power in Puerto Rico in 1898, many jíbaros organized Bandas Sediciosas (Seditious Bands) to protest American colonial rule. They continued this struggle via the 1930s armed clashes of members of the Nationalist Party of Puerto Rico against the repressive police forces of the colonial regime and via the Nationalist Party island-wide revolt of 1950.

== Modern domestic use ==
Since at least the 1920s the term "jíbaro" has had a more positive connotation in Puerto Rican culture, being now associated with a proud cultural heritage passed down to contemporary generations by the first brave settlers of the Puerto Rican interior mountains and countryside. However, the term occasionally also has a negative connotation. A jíbaro can mean someone who is considered ignorant or impressionable due to a lack of formal education, as are many country or "hillbilly" people of several other nations. Despite this negative connotation, the primary image is now that of a person representing the idea of a "traditional Puerto Rican": simple but hard-working, independent but prudently wise. Colloquially, the jíbaro imagery serves as a representation of the roots of the modern-day Puerto Rican people and symbolizes the strength of traditional values such as living simply and properly caring for the family and the homeland.

== In popular culture ==
There are many songs about the Puerto Rican jíbaro or, more dearly, the jíbarito, the diminutive of jíbaro. Lamento Borincano by Rafael Hernández is one of them. Others are "Aguinaldo Jíbaro" by Los Pleneros de la 21 y El Quinteto Criollo, El Jíbarito Bruto (Seis Villarán) and Un Jíbaro Bueno, both by Chuito el de Bayamón (aka El Decano de los Cantores); Jíbarita de Mi Tierra by Andrés Jiménez, and Un Jíbaro en San Juan and Negando su Idioma, both by Odilio González. A Louis Moreau Gottschalk piano piece, Souvenir de Porto Rico, Opus 31 (written ca. 1857) is subtitled "Marche des Gibaros."

== Use in other countries ==
- In Cuba there exists a word similar to jíbaro, Guajiro.
- In Colombia, Brazil and Venezuela, Xivaro, or Gibaro, which is pronounced similar to jíbaro, was a name given to the mountain natives of mentioned countries by the Spaniards and Portuguese.
- In northern Peru and eastern Ecuador, Jivaroan peoples are Indigenous peoples who speak the Chicham languages. The slur "jíbaro" was from colonial stereotypes of Jivaroan people as "savages".
- In Mexico, there is a famous boxer nicknamed "Jibaro", Raul 'El Jibaro" Perez.

== See also ==
- Jibarito
- Yomo Toro
- Cachi Cachi music
- La Carreta
- Machuchal
