= Cachi Cachi music =

Music played by Puerto Ricans after their migration to Hawaii

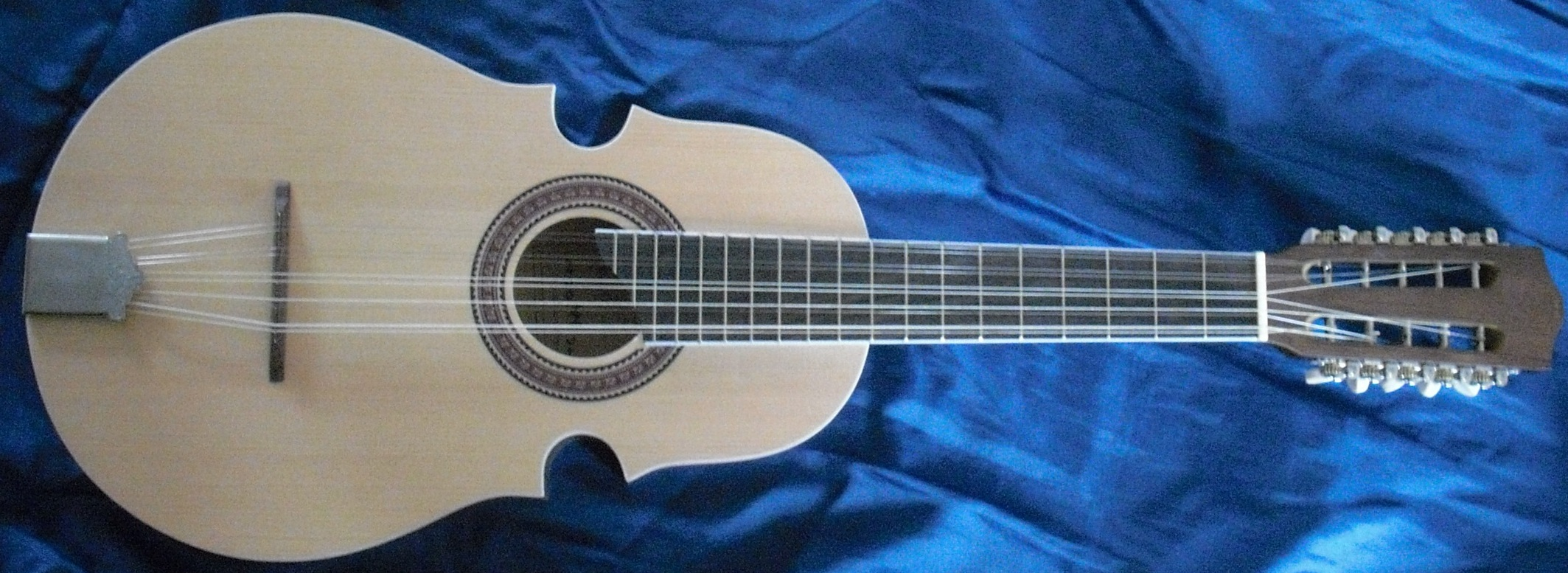
El Cuatro de Puerto Rico evolved from four to six to a ten-string instrument

Cachi Cachi music, also spelled Kachi Kachi, Kachi-Kachi and Katchi-Katchi, is a term that was coined to refer to music played by Puerto Ricans in Hawaii, after they migrated to Hawaii in 1901.

It is a "variation of dance music found in Hawaii" which is, at times, played very fast. The "influence on Hawai'i endures to this day in the musical form known as cachi cachi played on the quarto [sic] and derivative of the Puerto Rican jibaro style." Jibaro means farmer in Spanish. The Puerto Ricans in Hawaii "worked hard and played hard" and lightened the load for other plantation workers with their music.

In Hawaii, the Puerto Ricans played their music with six-string guitar, güiro, and the Puerto Rican cuatro. Maracas and "palitos" sticks could be heard in the music around the 1930s.

More modern versions of the music may include the accordion and electric and percussion instruments such as conga drums.

== Etymology ==
Cachi cachi music is what the people in Hawaii, who heard the Puerto Ricans playing their own music, called it. It needed a name and the people of Hawaii, specifically the Japanese plantation workers called it cachi cachi according to oral tradition- video recordings by Onetake2012 and research done by Ted Solis, an ethnomusicologist.

The Puerto Ricans, who only spoke Spanish and no English, worked alongside immigrants from the Philippines, China, but in one location their "camp" was next to the Japanese camp. and when the Japanese heard their music, they said it sounded "scratchy".

The relationships between the Japanese and Puerto Ricans working on the plantations, didn't used to be good. They lived near one another and the Puerto Ricans felt disrespected when the Japanese walked around naked or almost naked for their baths. Sometimes fights would break out.

== Current status ==
Modern Güiro
Sounds of the güiro

In 1989, the Smithsonian Folkways Recordings, a nonprofit established for recording music by small communities from around the world, made available an album called Puerto Rican music in Hawai'i containing 16 tracks. The Library of Congress included the recording in its 1990 list of "outstanding recordings" of US folk music for meeting specific criteria including that the music emphasizes "root traditions over popular adaptations of traditional materials."

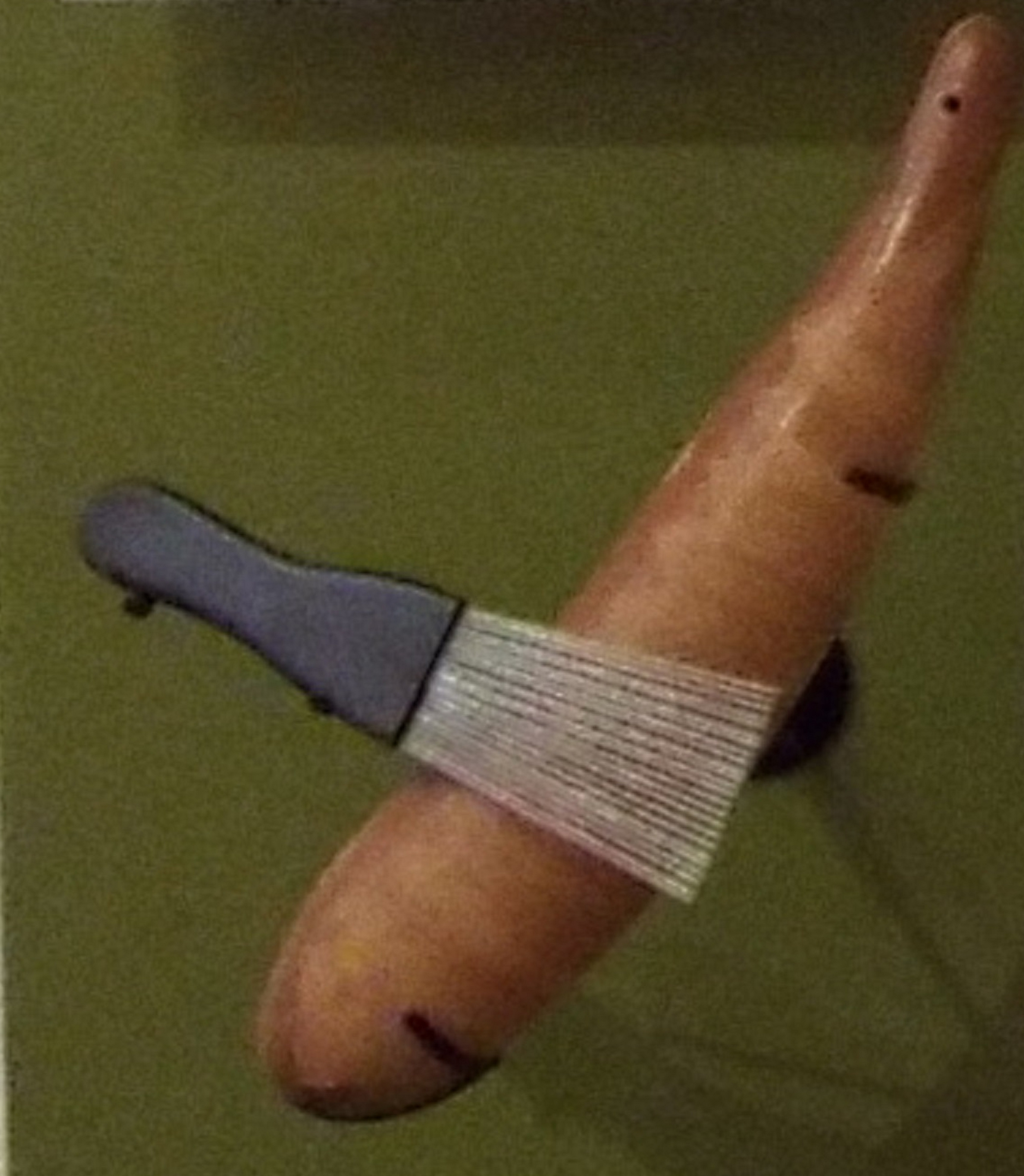
Phoenix-Musical Instrument Museum-Puerto Rican Güiro

William Cumpiano, a master guitar maker and his colleagues Wilfredo Echevarría and Juan Sotomayor researched, wrote, directed and produced a short documentary about the Hawaiian Puerto Ricans and their music which includes genres such as slack-key, décima, seís and aguinaldos. It was titled Un Canto en Otra Montaña or A Song From Another Mountain.

Sonny Morales, a resident of the Big Island of Hawaii, was "famous for making cuatros".

The young Auliʻi Cravalho, the voice of the Disney character, Moana, in the 2016 movie by the same name, talks about growing up with cachi cachi music. She was raised on the Big Island of Hawaii.

Willie K., an award-winning, Hawaiian musician from the island of Maui, sings about it with lyrics "Cachi cachi music Makawao ...play the conga drum down in Lahaina".

== Artists ==
Some of the artists who played or play a variety of Puerto Rican (cach cachi) music in Hawaii:

- Bobby Rodriguez
- Danny Rivera
- Darren Benitez
- Eddie Rivera
- Ernest Rivera
- Eva Lopez
- Glenn Ferreira
- Juan Rodriguez
- Luciano Alvarez
- Natalio Santiago
- Peter Rivera
- Raymond Rodriguez
- Silva Rivera
- Tiny
- Virginia Rodrigues
- Willie K

The following musicians are featured in the Puerto Rican Music of Hawaii CD by the Smithsonian Folkways.

- August M. Rodrigues
- Bobby Castillo
- Bonaventura Torres
- Charles Figueroa
- El Leo
- George Ayala
- Johnny Lopez
- Jorge Burgos
- Juan Cabrera
- Julio Rodrigues
- Leroy Joseph Pinero
- Los Caminantes
- Los Guepos
- Mi Gente
- Quique Rosario
- The Latin Five
- The Latin Gentlemen
- Tommy Valentine

== See also ==
- Poncie Ponce
- Music of Hawaii
- Music of Puerto Rico
- Boogaloo
- Jibaro
- Puerto Rican immigration to Hawaii
- List of Puerto Ricans
- Puerto Rico
- History of Hawaii
- Gabby Pahinui
