= Vicente Espinel =

Spanish writer and musician

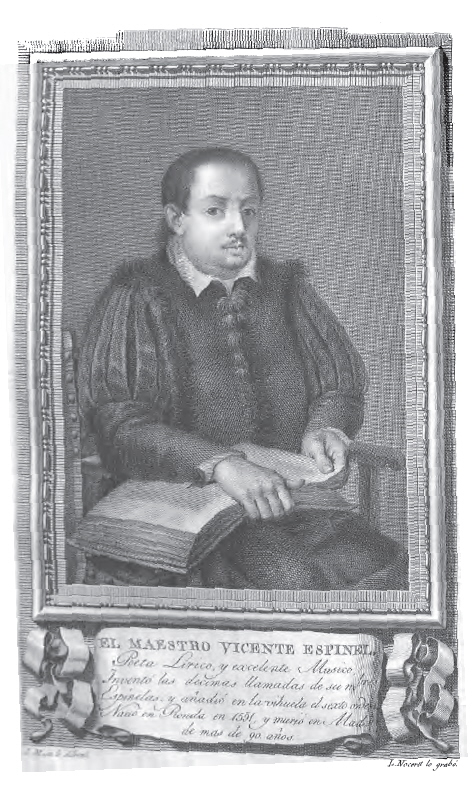
- Born: Vicente Gómez Martínez-Espinel; December 28, 1550; Ronda, Kingdom of Granada, Crown of Castile
- Died: February 4, 1624 (aged 73); Madrid, Kingdom of Castile, Crown of Castile
- Education: University of Salamanca
- Occupation(s): Writer, musician, composer

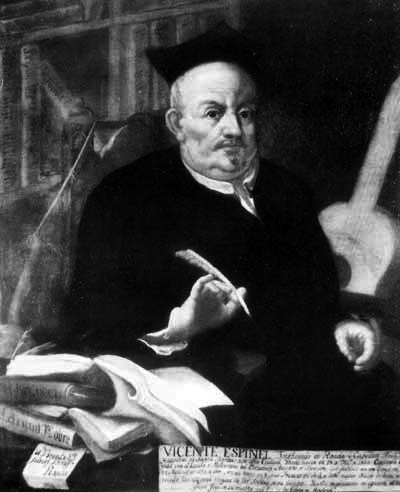
Vicente Espinel

Vicente Gómez Martínez-Espinel (Spanish pronunciation: [biˈθente espiˈnel]; 28 December 1550 – 4 February 1624) was a Spanish writer and musician of the Siglo de Oro. He is credited with the creation of the modern poetic form of the décima, composed of ten octameters, named espinela in Spanish after him.

== Biography ==
Espinel was born in Ronda. He studied at the University of Salamanca, where he adopted as his own his father's second surname, and later on at the universities of Granada and Alcalá. As a latinist, he translated to Spanish Horace's Epistola ad Pisones.

After leaving university, he had an adventurous life as a soldier, serving in Flanders and elsewhere. He was a prisoner of pirates at Argel and a soldier in Italy after being liberated, and returned to Spain about 1584. Afterwards, he moved to Madrid and took holy orders in 1589. Four years later he became chaplain at Ronda, but absented himself from his living. Still, his musical skill obtained for him the post of choirmaster at Plasencia.

His Diversas Rimas (Assorted Rhymes), produced in 1591, showed a caustic wit. Later, in 1618, the printer Juan de la Cuesta published Espinel's picaresque novel Relaciones de la vida del escudero Marcos de Obregón, for which he is best known. This book, with several autobiographical details, was printed in France the same year and inspired later Lesage's Gil Blas de Santillana. Espinel also revived the measure known as décimas or espinelas, consisting of a stanza of ten octosyllabic lines.

Lope de Vega, who referred to Espinel as his teacher, dedicated El caballero de Illescas (1602) to Espinel. Espinel also befriended Cervantes, Góngora (whose poetry he helped to publish) and Quevedo. Like his friends, he was a member of the congregation Esclavos del Santísimo Sacramento. At the time of his death, he was the chaplain at Madrid, and also the music teacher of the Plasencia bishop.

His bust can be found in Ronda, the city of his birth, in the small Plaza de los Gigantes. His head is decorated with a laurel wreath.

== Bibliography ==
- Obras completas, critical ed. by Gaspar Garrote Bernal. Málaga: Diputación Provincial, 2001-2002, 2 vols.
- Relaciones de la vida del escudero Marcos de Obregón, Madrid: Juan de la Cuesta, 1618, but also Barcelona: Sebastián de Cormellas, 1618 and Barcelona: Gerónimo Margarit, 1618. It was reprinted in the same century (Seville: Pedro Gómez de Pastrana y a su costa, 1641 and Madrid: Gregorio Rodríguez y a su costa, 1657). Also in the 18th century (Madrid, 1744) and the 19th century (1804, 1851, 1863, 1864, 1868, 1881). In the 20th century, the editions of Ignacio Bauer (1901 and 1928); Samuel Gili Gaya (1922 and 1940), José Mallorquí Figuerola (1940) etc. stand out.
- Diversas Rimas de Vicente Espinel, beneficiado de las iglesias de Ronda, con el Arte poética y algunas Odas de Oracio, traduzidas en verso castellano, Madrid: Luis Sánchez, 1591 (there are three different issues by the same printer and year).
- Translation of Horace, Arte poetica, included in his Diversas rimas (1591).
- Eclogue of Liseo, Silvio and Castor.
- Song to my homeland
