= Puerto Rican migration to Hawaii =

Puerto Rican migration to Hawaii began when Puerto Rico's sugar industry was devastated by two hurricanes in 1899. The devastation caused a worldwide shortage in sugar and a huge demand for the product from Hawaii. Consequently, Hawaiian sugarcane plantation owners began to recruit the jobless, but experienced, laborers from Puerto Rico. In thirteen separate groups, 5,883 Puerto Rican men, women and children traveled by ship, train, then ship again, to the islands of Hawaii to begin their new lives on the sugar plantations.

== Prelude ==
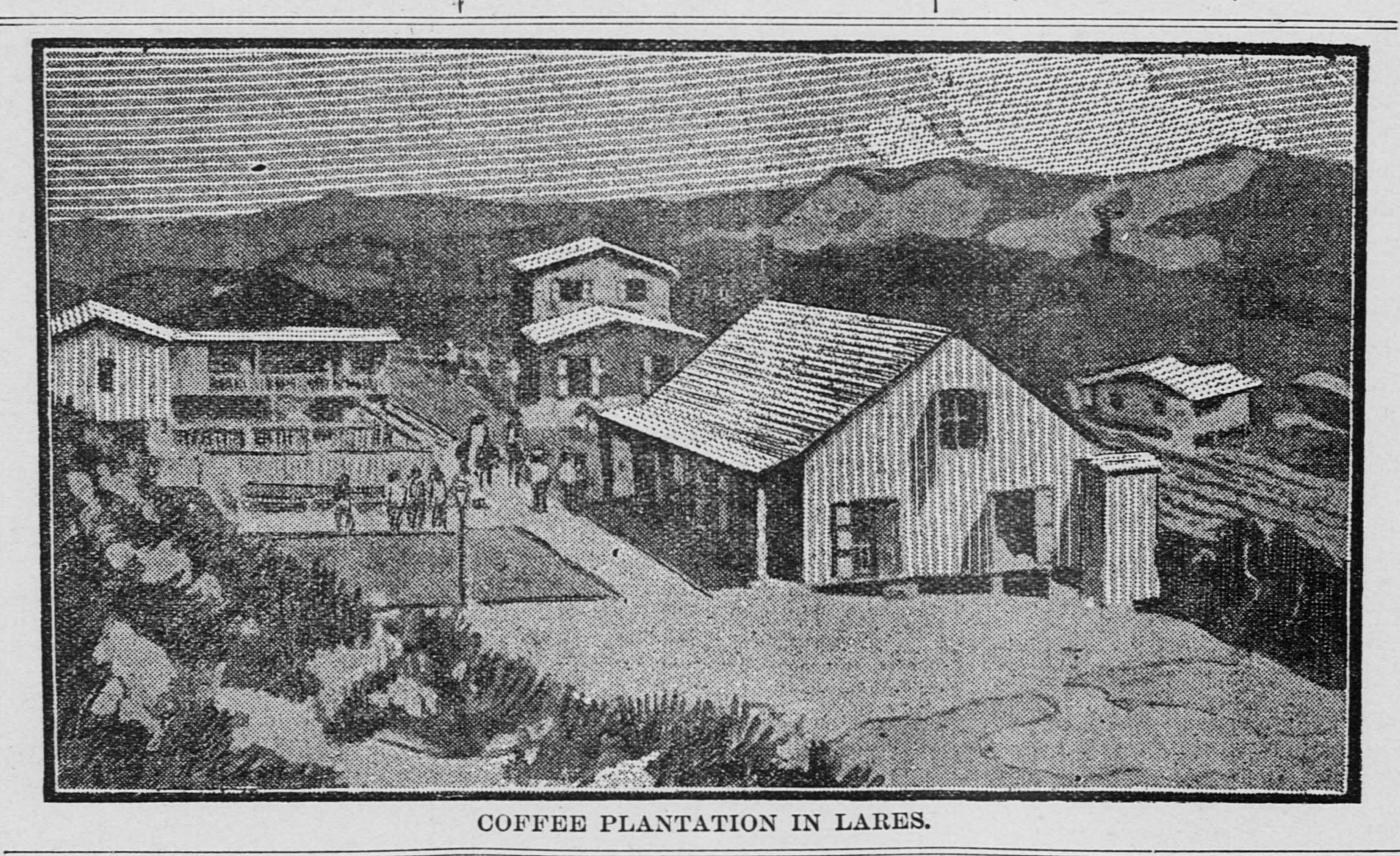
Drawing of a coffee farm in Lares depicted in a newspaper article titled "Porto Rican wealth" on June 8, 1901

In the 19th century, Puerto Rico depended mainly on its agricultural economy. The island, together with Cuba, was the Spanish Crown's leading exporter of sugar, coffee, tobacco and cotton. When the island was ceded to the United States after the Spanish–American War, as stipulated by the agreements of the Treaty of Paris of 1898, most of its industries were taken over by American industrialists. Labor was provided by Puerto Ricans who depended on the nation's agriculture as their only source of income.

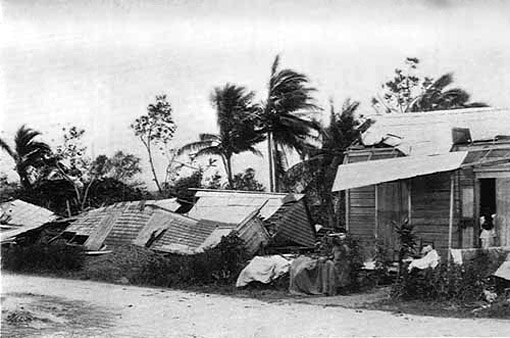
Damage after Hurricane San Ciriaco

On August 8, 1899, the San Ciriaco hurricane, with winds of over 100 mph (160 km/h), struck Puerto Rico and on August 22 another hurricane followed. The floods, caused by 28 days of continuous rain, damaged the agricultural industry and left 3,400 dead and thousands of people without shelter, food or work. As a result, there was a shortage of sugar from the Caribbean in the world market and a huge demand for the product from Hawaii and other sugar producing countries. To meet the demand, plantation owners began a campaign to recruit the jobless laborers in Puerto Rico. By 1901, the Hawaiian sugar output was 360,000 tons of raw sugar.

== First migrations from Puerto Rico ==
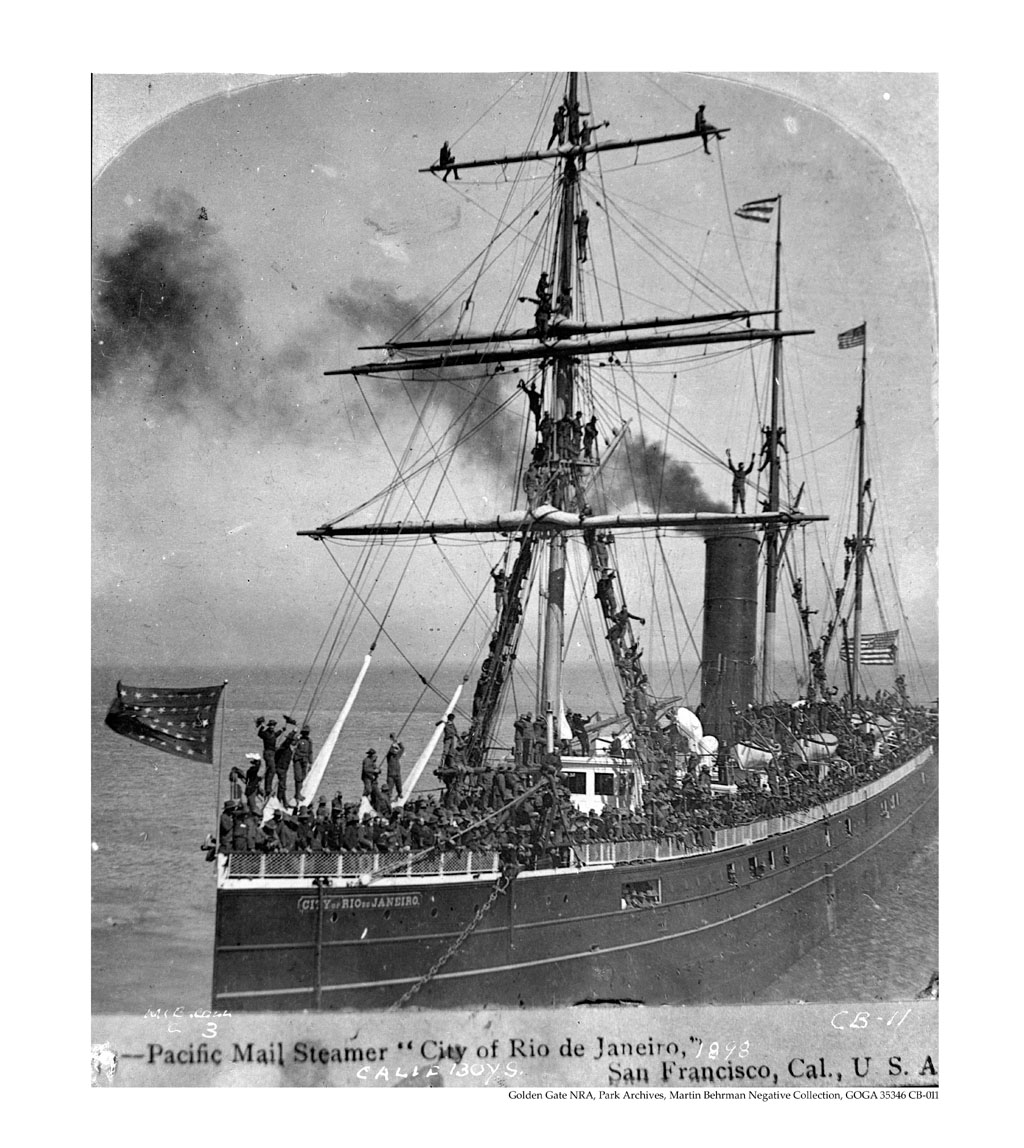
Type of steamship that brought people from Puerto Rico to Hawaii to work on the sugar plantations

On November 22, 1900, the first group of Puerto Ricans consisting of 56 men, began their long journey to Maui, Hawaii. The trip was long and unpleasant, first sailing from San Juan harbor to New Orleans, Louisiana. Once in New Orleans, the travelers boarded a railroad train to the Port of Los Angeles, California or San Francisco. From there they set sail aboard the SS City of Rio de Janeiro to Hawaii. According to the Los Angeles Times dated December 26, 1901, the Puerto Ricans were mistreated and starved by the shippers and the railroad company. They arrived in Honolulu, on December 23, 1900, and were sent to work in one of the different plantations owned by the "Big Five" on Hawaii's four islands. Often, groups of men and women with children would refuse to continue the journey to Hawaii. A December 15, 1900 San Francisco Examiner article said that 60 Puerto Ricans were forced onto the Rio in California, but 50 "escaped".

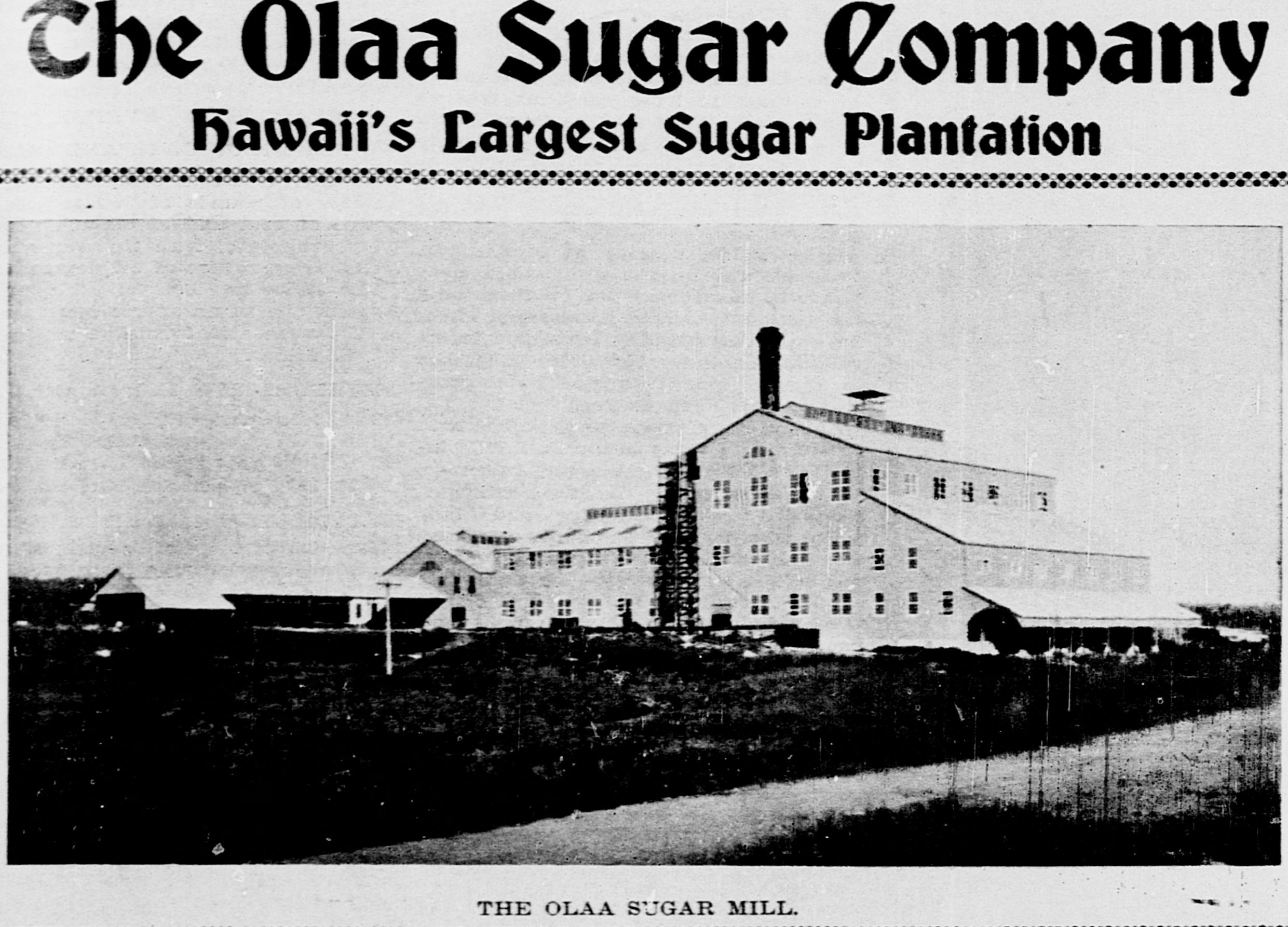
The Olaa Sugar Company, on the Big Island of Hawaii, was Hawaii's Largest Sugar Plantation (c. 1902)

By October 17, 1901, 5,000 Puerto Rican men, women and children had made their new homes on the four islands. Records show that, in 1902, 34 plantations had 1,773 Puerto Ricans on their payrolls; 1,734 worked as field hands and another 39 were clerks or luna/overseers (foremen).

Between 1900 and 1901, 11 trips took place to move Puerto Ricans to Hawaii to work in the fields.

People came from different places to work in the sugar plantations of Hawaii: the first were the Chinese, the second came from Portugal, the third group came from Japan, the fourth group came from Puerto Rico, the fifth came from Korea and the sixth group came from The Philippines and all these people worked together in the plantations. This mix of people of different tongues led to the need of a common vernacular which led to Hawaiian Pidgin.

In thirteen separate groups, 5883 Puerto Rican men, women and children traveled by ship, train then ship again to the islands of Hawaii to begin their new lives in the sugar plantations.

== Discrimination by the "Big Five" ==
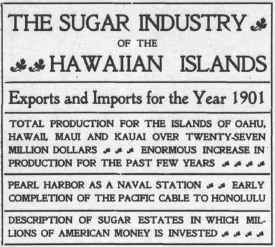
American investment in Hawaii's sugar industry is reported in the November 1901 of the "Evening Bulletin Industrial Edition".

The "Big Five" was the name given to a group of sugarcane corporations that wielded considerable political power in the Territory of Hawai‘i and leaned heavily towards the Hawai‘i Republican Party. The "Big Five" consisted of Castle & Cooke, Alexander & Baldwin, C. Brewer & Co., Amfac and Theo H. Davies & Co.

The owners of the "Big Five" were Euro-Americans who would indulge in discrimination and bigotry against ethnic groups who worked the plantations. They had an association called the Hawaiian Sugar Planters' Association (HSPA) whose power was equivalent to an oligarchy. The Attorney General of Hawai‘i, referring to the "Big Five", said in 1903, "There is a government in this Territory which is centralized to an extent unknown in the United States, and probably almost as centralized as it was in France under Louis XIV." Wages and living accommodations depended upon their job and race. Europeans were paid more and received better quarters. Most of the workers moved from plantation to plantation to work because they did not like the work they did and because of the racial discrimination.

In 1920, Puerto Rican and Portuguese sugar plantation workers at Ewa, a district of Oahu, joined work strikes that began with the Filipino and Japanese workers, who were demanding better pay and an end to discriminatory practices.

== Struggle for U.S. citizenship ==
External audio
- You may watch a short segment of the documentary "Puertorriqueños en Hawaii" (Puerto Ricans in Hawaii) here

According to the State of Hawaii Data Book 1982, by the year 1910, there were 4,890 Puerto Ricans living in Hawaii. Puerto Rico and Hawaii were unincorporated and incorporated territories of the United States respectively; however, the passage of the Jones–Shafroth Act of 1917, the same year that the United States entered World War I, gave American citizenship, with limitations, to the Puerto Rican residents in Puerto Rico but excluded those who resided in Hawaii. Yet, the "non-citizen" Puerto Ricans were assigned draft numbers and were expected to serve in the military.

The plantation owners, like those that comprised the "Big Five", found territorial status convenient, enabling them to continue importing cheap foreign labor; such immigration was prohibited in various other states of the Union. In 1917, Puerto Ricans in the island, believing that they were entitled to the same rights that every other U.S. citizens had, tried to sign up to vote in a local Hawaiian election and were denied their rights by the county clerk who claimed that early immigrants to Hawaii were not covered by the Jones Act.

Manuel Olivieri Sanchez, a court interpreter at the time, became enraged in what he viewed as a violation of the civil rights of his fellow countrymen. He encouraged his fellow Puerto Ricans to protest by telling them that "If you are not allowed to vote, don't answer the draft call". Olivieri Sanchez led a legal battle for the recognition of the Hawaiian Puerto Ricans as citizens of the United States. In the first legal battle the lower court ruled in favor of the county clerk; however, Olivieri Sanchez did not give up the fight and took the case before the Territorial Supreme Court, which reversed the decision of the lower court, granting the Puerto Ricans of Hawaii their United States citizenship.

== Struggle against discrimination ==
Olivieri Sanchez' victory was not welcomed by members of HSPA, who depended on the cheap labor non-citizens provided. In 1930, HSPA began to circulate false rumors, they made it be known that they (HSPA) were planning to recruit laborers in Puerto Rico, while at the same time they had the Honolulu Star Bulletin and some local newspapers they controlled run anti-Puerto Rican stories, that—for example—claimed Puerto Ricans were "unhealthy hookwormers who had bought disease to Hawaii".

In December 1931, Olivieri Sanchez wrote a letter to the editor of the Hawaiian Advertiser where he stated that he saw all of the rhetoric as a tactic by HSPA to push all the different ethnic groups in the local labor force back to work on the plantations. He was right; the HSPA wanted to persuade the United States Congress to exempt the territory from a law, which in 1924 was requested by California to prevent the migration of Filipinos and Japanese nationals to the U.S. (National Origins Quota Act (Immigration Act) and Johnson Immigration Act of 1924). HSPA's secretary treasurer claimed that the association was unwilling to import Puerto Ricans to Hawaii. His defamation of Puerto Ricans condemned not only the Puerto Ricans of Hawaii, but also those on the island of Puerto Rico. Despite the efforts of Olivieri Sanchez, HSPA had their way and Hawaii was exempted from the stern anti-immigration laws of the time.

The power of the plantation owners was finally broken by the activist descendants of the original immigrant laborers. It was recognized that they were born in an incorporated United States territory and that they were legal American citizens with full local voting rights and therefore were entitled to actively campaign for statehood recognition of the Hawaiian Islands.

== Puerto Rican influence ==
Currently, there are over 30,000 Puerto Ricans or Hawaiian-Puerto Ricans living in Hawaii. Puerto Rican culture and traditions are very strong there. One of the traditions that is still practiced is the compadrazgo. When a person baptizes somebody's child, he or she becomes the padrino (godfather) of the child and the compadre or comadre of the child's parents. There is a relationship of respect, mutual affection and obligation between the child, parents and compadres. The children ask for a blessing, La bendición, and the padrinos respond with a Dios te bendiga (God bless you).

=== Food ===
The platano, a main staple of Puerto Rican cuisine was not found in Hawaii. But as in Puerto Rico, Hawaiian-Puerto Ricans enjoy the preparation of pasteles (meat pies) during the Christmas holidays. Some of the members of the family cut green bananas (in place of plantains) and season them while others prepare the masa (dough). The masa is then filled with seasoned pork and other ingredients, wrapped in banana or ti plant leaves and finally tied with a string. The pastel is boiled in water until cooked.

=== Music ===
External audio
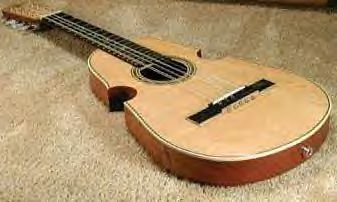
- A "Thinline" Cumpiano Puerto Rican Cuatro. You may listen to Hawaiian-Puerto Ricans playing the "Cuatro"

When Puerto Ricans migrated to Hawaii they took their music and their musical instruments along with them. Among the musical instruments introduced to Hawaii was the Puerto Rican cuatro. The cuatro was a four-stringed guitar developed in Puerto Rico in 1875; however, it eventually evolved into a ten-stringed guitar. Other musical instruments introduced were the maraca, a rattle containing dried seeds, and the guiro, a percussion instrument made out of a gourd and played with a scraping stick. Soon, these instruments were not only limited to playing Spanish songs, but were also absorbed by the typical songs of Hawaii. Cachi Cachi music is a style of music which began in Hawaii in the early 1900s when the Puerto Ricans migrated to Hawaii.

In 1998, master guitarmaker William R. Cumpiano and his colleagues wrote, directed and produced Un Canto en Otra Montaña: Música Puertorriqueña en Hawaii ('A Song Heard in Another Mountain: Puerto Rican Music in Hawaii'), a short-feature video documentary on the music and social history of the century-old Puerto Rican diaspora in Hawaii.

== Puerto Ricans in Hawaii and centennial ==
On December 23, 2000, the Puerto Ricans in Hawaii celebrated a centennial celebration. They published a Puerto Ricans of Hawaii recipe book featuring how the people managed to prepare their cuisine in Hawaii, improvising with other ingredients when necessary. Los Pleneros de la 21, a bomba and plena musical group were part of the celebration.

The following table is in accordance with the U.S. Census 2000 Data for the State of Hawaii. Despite having left Puerto Rico long ago, and being a product of intermarriages, many still identify as Puerto Rican when some Puerto Rican heritage exists in their family history.

Hawaii Puerto Rican population
1990	2000
Total: 25,778	Total: 30,005
Percent of population: 2.3%	Percent of population:2.5%
Hawaii Puerto Rican population by county
Honolulu County	18,933
Hawaii County	6,243
Maui County	3,290
Kauai County	1,539
Total Puerto Rican population	30,005

== The Puerto Rican coquí in Hawaii ==
During the late 20th century, the coquí, a thumbnail-sized tree frog endemic to Puerto Rico, became established in Hawaii, most likely as stowaways in shippings of potted plants. Its loud mating call, "music to the ears" of Puerto Ricans on their native highland, is considered an annoyance in Hawaii where this invasive species reaches much higher population densities. Unsuccessful efforts were made to exterminate the infestation.

== Notable Hawaiian-Puerto Ricans ==
Some of the Hawaiian-Puerto Ricans who have distinguished themselves are:

- Augie Colón (1928–2004) – Percussionist with Martin Denny; originator of "jungle noises" in exotica music.
- Faith Evans (U.S. Marshal) – A former state legislator and the first woman in the United States to serve as a U.S. Marshal.
- Felicia Garcia-Alves – In 2000, was recognized as one of the most outstanding women's basketball athletes in Hawaii, and in Puerto Rico.
- Bruno Mars (Peter Eugene Hernandez), singer-songwriter; his paternal grandfather was a Puerto Rican from New York
- Rodney Morales – author of novel When the Shark Bites (2002) and the short story collection Speed of Darkness (1988).
- Manuel Olivieri Sanchez – Led the battle for U.S. citizenship for Puerto Ricans living in Hawaii
- Danny Ongais – race car driver
- Hilda Ortiz – In 1924, became the first Puerto Rican teacher in Hawaii
- Nancy Ortiz – Host of "Alma Latina", a three-hour Sunday radio show of Latin-American music.
- Kade Ruotolo – submission wrestler and martial artist; Puerto Rican mother
- Tye Ruotolo – submission wrestler and martial artist; Puerto Rican mother
- Alex Santiago – Former Hawaii State Representative

== See also ==
- List of Puerto Ricans
- Oahu sugar strike of 1920
- Spanish immigration to Hawaii
- Stateside Puerto Ricans
