= The Jibaro's Verses =

Series of poems written by Miguel Cabrera de Arecibo

Jíbaro’s Verses (Spanish: Coplas del Jíbaro) were a series of poems written by an educated Puerto Rican creole known by the name Miguel Cabrera de Arecibo, published on June 20, 1820. The poems were originally written as a satirical jab at conservative mentalities in Puerto Rico, but eventually the “Jíbaro’s Verses” became some of the base works for the popularization of the legendary Jíbaro in Puerto Rican culture.

== Background ==
The Jíbaro has become a national symbol in Puerto Rico that represents the self-sufficient, anti-establishment, mixed-raced peasant of Puerto Rico. The formation of the Jíbaro stemmed from a desire among settlers as far back as the late 1500s to separate themselves from the governmental, racial, religious, and economic constraints instituted by the Spaniard influence in Puerto Rico. Settlers that felt isolated in Puerto Rico due to the strict social hierarchy and cultural cycle established dominantly by the Spaniards retreated to the mountains in search of a more independent lifestyle, mixing primarily with Africans but arguably the native Taínos as well – however, this formation of the Jíbaro is an account both based in history and myth. Historically, the Jíbaro was a very marginalized figure due to a perception of being outliers to the social order as they forged their own lifestyle where agriculture was valued above industry and racial hierarchies were not deeply considered; however this separation from the dominant culture created a stigma that Jíbaros were uneducated, lazy, and irrelevant – similar to the stigmatization of the American hillbilly.

== The Jíbaro’s Verses ==
During the liberal reforms in Puerto Rico in the early 1800s, giving a voice to the ostracized Jíbaros was a very effective political tactic as the Jíbaro created a symbol that other liberal minded activists could rally behind. When Miguel Cabrera de Arecibo wrote the “Jíbaro’s Verses”, this was not the first time a Jíbaro was mentioned in the press – in 1814, an anonymous letter was sent to the publisher of the Puerto Rican newspaper El Diario economico de Puerto Rico, Alejandro Ramírez, protesting the abuses of local tax authorities on poor workers, to which the letter was signed “The Patient Jíbaro” and the identity of the author was never discovered.

Originally, when Cabrera had written the Jíbaro’s Verses, he had submitted the poems to be published anonymously, which caused controversy as the intentions of Cabrera’s satirical poetry were unclear, leading many people to believe it was a conservative attack on the new political order achieved by the reinstatement of the Spanish Constitution of 1812 that had granted more autonomy to Puerto Rico. Due to the misinterpretation, Cabrera came forward as the author of the poems and clarified his liberal intents to mock conservative opposition. The content of the Verses reflected a more anarchical perspective that celebrated the freedom granted by the Spanish Constitution to do whatever one pleases without fear of ecclesiastical intervention, criticizing the civic and patriarchal systems instilled by clerical authorities. Giving a symbolic voice to the illiterate and oppressed Jíbaro posed a threat to educated, conservative elites because it granted the Jíbaro to engage in political conversations that were previously thought to have been impossible, expressing freedom in terms of liberal mentalities that rejected political and social constraints. Of course, with Cabrera’s revealing of himself the validity of his Jíbaro’s claims diminished, but the impact of Cabrera’s use of the Jíbaro was significant as it contributed to the symbolic formation of the Puerto Rican as a Jíbaro through further literary representations of history from Jíbaro perspectives. The Verses themselves were carefully written in a poetic style called a décima which was a known song style among rural Puerto Rican peasants, such as the Jíbaro (Scarano, Frances A 1409). Cabrera’s popularization of the décima gave way to the association of literary work written either from the perspective or claimed identity of a Jíbaro to be in the format of a décima.

== Impact ==
Miguel Cabrera de Arecibo did not invent the Jíbaro as it was already a common term in Puerto Rico, but by giving the Jíbaro a voice he was able to create an incredibly potent archetype for the rustic peasant that would become the basis for many literary and historical critiques as well as a symbol for Puerto Ricans to identify with in order to differentiate themselves for imperial rule. Cabrera’s intensification of claiming a Jíbaro identity in poetic writing in order to make a political point would become a popular trope in Puerto Rican poetry and music as it allowed an attempt at a uniquely Puerto Rican perspective to be made. Historical accounts from the point of view of a Jíbaro began to find their way into publication, and whether the validity of these viewpoints can be fully recognized or not, the desire to represent history from the perspective of a Jíbaro has become a powerful statement in Puerto Rican literature.
