= Seis =

Type of Puerto Rican Jíbaro dance music

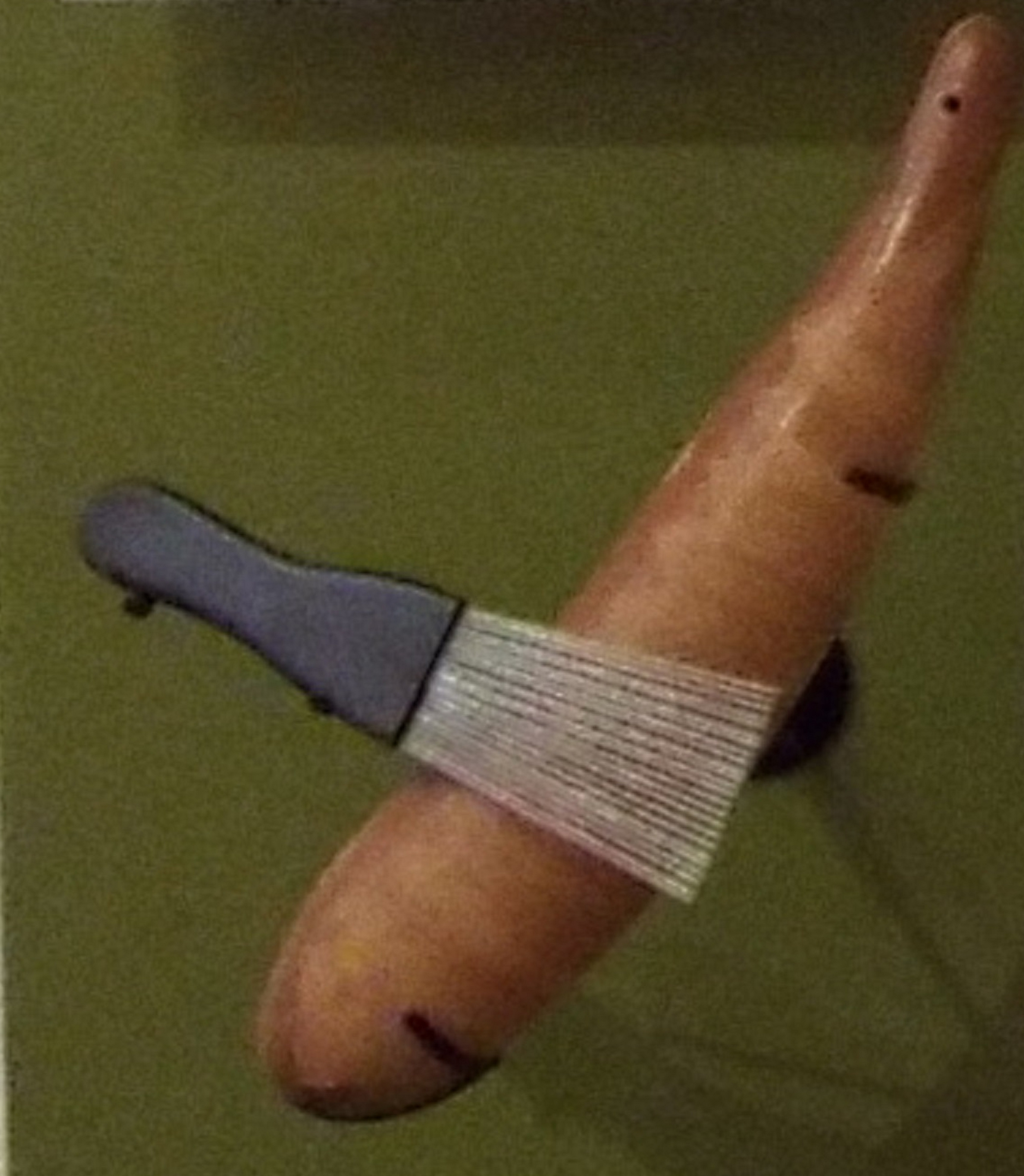
Puerto Rican Güiro

The seis is a type of Puerto Rican Jíbaro dance music closely associated with the décima. It originated in the latter half of the 17th century in the southern part of Spain. The seis is influenced by Spanish, African, and Taino cultures. The Arabian aspects come from Spain, where the Muslims or the Moors had ruled for over 700 years. Like other Jíbaro music, the seis is associated with Christmas, folkloric festivals, concursos de trovadores (poetry-singing contests), and other large celebrations. The word means six, which may have come from the custom of having six couples perform the dance, though many more couples eventually became quite common. Men and women form separate lines down the hall or in an open place of beaten earth, one group facing the other. The lines would approach and cross each other and at prescribed intervals the dancers would tap out the rhythm with their feet.

== Instruments ==
The seis was made for a solo voice and accompanying instruments. The melodies and harmonies are simple, usually performed on the cuatro, guitar, bongó, and güiro, although other indigenous instruments are used depending on the available musicians. Spanish instrumentation and harmonies, typically from the Andalusian region, are prominent. In the 20th century, Afro-Caribbean aspects were included through the bongó, syncopated bass, and Cuban rhythms. These were especially used in studio recordings. There are different variations of the seis named after towns where they originated (for example, the seis fajardeño or seis de Fajardo), their composers (an example being the seis de Andino), the specific dance style (such as a seis chorreao), harmonic style (for example, the seis mapeyé), and type of text, which is often improvised (a prime example being the seis con décima). The seis con décima is one of the types that is not danced to and it's the slowest. The seis mapeyé or le lo lai is always in minor and the lyrics are about nostalgia. Each variation has its own musical tonality and key (major or minor), making it sound happy or sad.

== Lyrics ==
Since the 19th century, the lyrics are about migration, urbanization, love, patriotism, sociopolitics, maternal devotion, the natural beauty of the Puerto Rican countryside and other topics. Migration is an important theme as a massive wave of Puerto Ricans migrated to the United States between the 1920s and the 1950s. These massive migrations started after the American invasion when the economy was changed from an agriculturally-based one to one which was industrially-based, leaving many Puerto Ricans without jobs on the island. The Puerto Rican government encouraged the Puerto Ricans to migrate, especially after World War II. Most Puerto Ricans settled in New York, where Puerto Rican music was played at social clubs, especially Jíbaro music.

== See also ==
- Florencio Morales Ramos
- Cachi Cachi music
