= Manuel Olivieri Sanchez =

Puerto Rican civil rights activist in Hawaii (1888–1961)

Manuel Olivieri Sánchez
- Born: January 20, 1888; Yauco, Puerto Rico
- Died: July 13, 1961 (aged 73); Honolulu, Hawaii
- Occupations: court interpreter and civil rights activist

Notes
- Because of his efforts United States citizenship was granted to Puerto Ricans living in Hawaii.

Manuel Olivieri Sánchez (January 20, 1888 – July 13, 1961) was a court interpreter and civil rights activist who led the legal battle which recognized U.S. citizenship for Puerto Ricans living in Hawaii.

== Early years ==
Olivieri Sánchez was born in Yauco, Puerto Rico, when the island was still a Spanish possession. As a native inhabitant of Puerto Rico, he was a Spanish subject. Olivieri Sánchez was still residing in the island when the United States annexed Puerto Rico after the Spanish–American War in 1898 and Spain had lost its last colony in the western hemisphere.

== United States occupation of Puerto Rico ==
The United States established a military government, which acted as both head of the army of occupation and administrator of civil affairs. Almost immediately, the United States began the "Americanization" process of Puerto Rico. The U.S. occupation brought about a total change in Puerto Rico's economy and polity and did not apply democratic principles in their colony. Puerto Rico was classified as an "unincorporated territory," which meant that the protections of the United States Constitution — including the right of citizenship — did not automatically apply, because the island belonged to the U.S., but was not part of the U.S.

One of the conditions of the treaty was the transfer by cession the allegiance of the islanders to the United States. Olivieri Sánchez was a citizen of Puerto Rico, but not of the United States even though the island was governed by that nation.

== Situation in Puerto Rico after Hurricane San Ciriaco ==
On August 8, 1899, Hurricane San Ciriaco, with winds of over 100 miles per hour, struck Puerto Rico and, on August 22, another hurricane followed. The floods caused by 28 days of continuous rain damaged the agricultural industry and left 3,400 dead and thousands of people without shelter, food or work. As a result, there was a shortage of sugar from the Caribbean in the world market and a huge demand for the product from Hawaii and other sugar producing countries. To meet the demand, plantation owners from Hawaii began a campaign to recruit the jobless laborers in Puerto Rico.

== First Puerto Rican immigrants to Hawaii ==
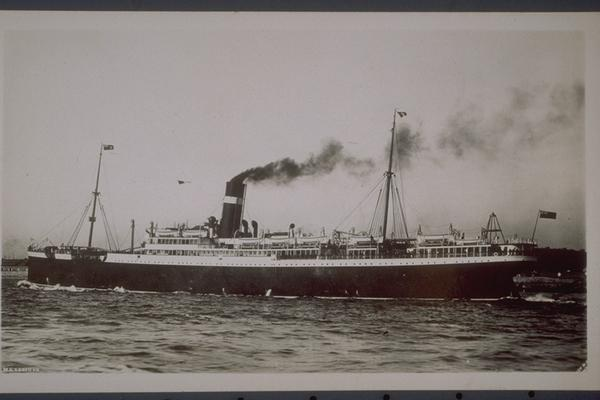
Type of Steamship in which Puerto Ricans immigrated to Hawaii.

On November 22, 1900, the first group of Puerto Ricans consisting of 56 men, began their long journey to Maui, Hawaii. The trip was long and unpleasant. They first set sail from San Juan harbor to New Orleans, Louisiana. Once in New Orleans, they were boarded on a railroad train and sent to Port Los Angeles, California. From there they set sail aboard the Rio de Janeiro to Hawaii. According to the "Los Angeles Times" dated December 26, 1901, the Puerto Ricans were mistreated and starved by the shippers and the railroad company. They arrived in Honolulu, on December 23, 1900, and were sent to work in different plantations on Hawaii's four islands.

By October 17, 1901, 5,000 Puerto Rican men, women and children had made their new homes on the four islands. Records show that, in 1902, 34 plantations had 1,773 Puerto Ricans on their payrolls; 1,734 worked as field hands and another 39 were clerks or overseers (foremen). Wages and living accommodations depended upon their jobs and race. Europeans were paid more and were given better living quarters. Most of the workers moved from plantation to plantation to work because they did not like the work they did and because of the racial discrimination.

== Manuel Olivieri Sánchez travels to Hawaii ==
In 1900, when Olivieri Sánchez was 12 years old, his father died. That same year, the United States passed the Foraker Act establishing the territorial status of Puerto Rico and Puerto Rican citizenship in accordance to Section VII. Therefore, Puerto Ricans were not entitled to the same rights that citizens of the United States had, even though the island was governed by that nation. Olivieri Sánchez's family financial situation worsened and in 1901, he moved to Hawaii with his mother. He became fluent in both English and Spanish and worked as a court interpreter.

At the time Puerto Rico and Hawaii were unincorporated and incorporated territories of the United States respectively; however, the passage of the Jones-Shafroth Act of 1917, same year that the U.S. entered World War I, granted U.S. citizenship to the Puerto Rican residents in Puerto Rico and excluded those who resided in Hawaii. Even though Puerto Ricans in Hawaii were excluded from U.S. citizenship, they were assigned draft numbers along with those who were citizens.

Plantation owners, like those that comprised the so-called Big Five, had an association called the "Hawaiian Sugar Planters' Association" (HSPA), found territorial status convenient, enabling them to continue importing cheap labor overseas, especially from Puerto Rico and Asia. Such immigration was prohibited in various other states of the Union.

== Struggle for U.S. citizenship ==
In 1917, Puerto Ricans in the island, believing that they were entitled to the same rights that every other U.S. citizens had, tried to sign up to vote in a local Hawaiian election and were denied their rights by David Kalauokalani, the county clerk, who claimed that early immigrants to Hawaii were not covered by the Jones Act. Olivieri Sánchez became enraged in what he viewed as a violation of the civil rights of his fellow countrymen. He encouraged his fellow Puerto Ricans to protest by telling them that "If you are not allowed to vote, don't answer the draft call". Olivieri Sánchez took a mandamus suit to court with the claim that all Puerto Ricans were United States citizens and entitled to the civil rights guaranteed by the Constitution of the United States, however the lower court ruled in favor of the county clerk.

Olivieri Sánchez hired two liberal lawyers. Together they presented the case to the Territorial Supreme Court. The case known as "IN THE MATTER OF THE PETITION OF MANUEL OLIVIERI SANCHEZ FOR A WRIT OF MANDAMUS AGAINST DAVID KALAUOKALANI" No. 1024, which was decided on October 22, 1917, reversed the lower court's decision. The Territorial Supreme Court recognized that all Puerto Ricans in Hawaii were citizens of the United States and were entitled to all rights of citizenship.

== Struggle against discrimination ==
Olivieri Sánchez' victory was not welcomed by the members of HSPA, who depended on the cheap labor non-citizens provided. In 1930, HSPA began circulating false rumors. They made it known that they (HSPA) planned to recruit laborers in Puerto Rico, while at the same time they had the "Honolulu Star Bullentin" and other local newspapers they controlled run anti-Puerto Rican stories—claiming, for example, that Puerto Ricans were "unhealthy hookwormers who had bought disease to Hawaii".

In a Dec. 1931 letter to the editor of the "Hawaiian Advertiser," Olivieri Sánchez wrote that he saw all of the rhetoric as a tactic by the HSPA to push the different ethnic groups in the local labor force back to work on the plantations. He was right, the HSPA wanted to persuade Congress to exempt the territory from a law, which in 1924 was requested by California to prevent the migration of Filipinos and Japanese nationals to the U.S. (National Origins Quota Action (Immigration Act) and Johnson Immigration Act of 1924). HSPA's secretary treasurer J. K. Butler claimed that the association was unwilling to import Puerto Ricans to Hawaii. His defamation of Puerto Ricans condemned not only the Puerto Ricans of Hawaii, but also those on the island. Despite the efforts of Olivieri Sánchez, HSPA had their way and Hawaii was exempted from the stern anti-immigration laws of the time.

The power of the plantation owners was finally broken by the activist descendants of the original immigrant laborers. Because they were born in an incorporated United States territory and they were legal American citizens, they gained full local voting rights and actively campaigned for statehood for the Hawaiian Islands.

== Death ==
Olivieri Sánchez died at St. Francis Hospital in Honolulu, Hawaii on July 13, 1961.

== Legacy ==
His efforts helped to make the United States citizenship, which was granted to the citizens of Puerto Rico by way of the Jones Act of 1917, to be extended to the Puerto Ricans living there.

== See also ==
- List of Puerto Ricans
- Corsican immigration to Puerto Rico
- Puerto Rican immigration to Hawaii
