= Faith Evans (U.S. Marshal) =

American politician

Faith Patricia Evans (May 11, 1937 – January 9, 2014) was a Hawaii state legislator and one of the first women to serve as a United States Marshal.

== Early years ==
Evans, of Hawaiian and Puerto Rican descent, was born in Honolulu, Hawaii. She previously worked as public relations director of Habilitat Inc., and was a member of the Hawaii Legislature for six years (1974–1980).

== U.S. Marshal ==
Evans was appointed U.S. Marshal for the District of Hawaii by President Ronald Reagan on August 12, 1982. She was involved in various high-profile cases while serving as U.S. Marshal. One of them was the 1984 case of Henry Huihui, a leading figure in Hawaii's underworld, who became a protected Federal witness in a plea bargain that required him to testify, on request, about crimes he knew about. According to Evans:

"The request to us to allow the meeting came from the strike force attorney (Frank Marine) for the Organized Crime Strike Force here." "It was granted on the basis that it would help in getting other defendants to enter guilty pleas" Mrs. Evans added. "It was heavily guarded, and contrary to reports, he only was with two or three of them at a time, not the whole group."

Another high-profile case was that involving Franklin Y.K. Sunn. Hawaii's top welfare officer who was jailed on a contempt-of-court charge in 1983. Before the judge set Sunn free, Evans said:

"Mr. Sunn would be confined to the Oahu Community Correctional Center, a jail administered by the Department of Social Services that he heads."

== Other activities ==
Evans was also a registered nurse who worked at St. Francis Hospital. She founded the Puerto Rican Heritage Society in Hawaii and, in 2000, led the Puerto Rican Centennial Commission of Hawaii. During the celebration activities of the Puerto Rican Centennial Commission, Evans was quoted as saying:

"Puerto Ricans are not a very well understood ethnic group. For a long time we didn't get the respect we should have."

== Death ==
Evans died on January 9, 2014, in Kailua, Hawaii. She is survived by husband, Noel; son, John; daughters, Tricia and Kathleen; sister, June (Harry) Shultz, Leona Parker; brother, Donald Ernesto.

Hawaii Gov. Neil Abercrombie paid tribute to Evans and ordered that the flags of the United States and State of Hawaii be flown at half-staff at all state offices and agencies as well as the Hawaii National Guard from sunrise to sunset on Friday, Jan. 17, 2014, the day of her memorial services.

== See also ==
- List of Puerto Ricans
- Irish immigration to Puerto Rico
- Puerto Rican migration to Hawaii
