= History of performing arts in Puerto Rico =

The performing arts on Puerto Rico have been an important form of cultural expression throughout the history of the island, particularly dance and music. Theatre has also played an integral role in shaping the culture of this Caribbean commonwealth. Puerto Rico's dance and music has emerged from the ritualized celebrations of the island's indigenous people to a diverse range of blended genres adapted from all over the world.

Before the arrival of European explorers, the Taíno Indians, who were the island's first inhabitants, used music and dance for traditional celebrations. These celebrations included events like religious ceremonies and other festivities. The styles and genres of dance and music on Puerto Rico have been highly influenced by countries like Africa, Europe, and the United States. Because Spain was the first country to colonize Puerto Rico, it had the most impact on the island's culture. Some of the most popular forms of dance originated in Spain, and have evolved into dance movements that are unique to the island. Forms of dance that originated in Africa, Spain, and other parts of the Caribbean include salsa, merengue, danza, plena, bomba, and cha-cha. Puerto Rico's Caribbean neighbors that have had the most influence on the choreography of the island's dance genres are Cuba and the Dominican Republic. There is also an infamous Puerto Rican dance which is, in fact, called the Puerto Rico. Theater is also a popular form of performing arts on Puerto Rico. There are several performing arts theaters on the island, mostly in the capital city of San Juan.
