= Décima =

Ten-line stanza of poetry

A décima is a ten-line stanza of poetry. The most popular form is called décima espinela after Vicente Espinel (1550–1624), a Spanish writer, poet, and musician from the Spanish Golden Age who used it extensively throughout his compositions.

The décima deals with a wide range of subject matters, including themes that are philosophical, religious, lyrical, and political. Humorous décimas would typically satirize an individual's weakness or foolish act. A decimero would frequently challenge the target of the satire or his/her defender to respond in kind with a décima, thereby setting up a duel that tests the originality and wit of contending composers.

== Styles ==
=== Latin America and Spain ===
The décima in all Latin America and in Spain is a style of poetry that is octosyllabic and has 10 lines to the stanza. The espinela rhyming scheme ($\mathrm{ABBAACCDDC}$) is the de facto scheme in use. It is spoken, sung and written throughout Latin America with variations in different countries. It is often improvised.

Each country has its own melody and tone ("tonada") and a different instrument, but the style and structure are exactly the same. A person who writes or improvises décima is known as a decimista or decimero.

=== Décima Afro-Pacífica ===
The décima afro-pacífica is an extension of the décima espinela into four décima stanzas with an introductory four-line stanza (or copla) that often summarizes the entire work using the 10th line of each décima stanza, making a total of forty four octosyllabic lines (one quatrain plus four décima espinelas).

The term "octosyllabic" may be misleading to English speakers as in Spanish the term refers to "metric syllables", meaning that the number of syllables is counted by the amount of spoken syllables the line carries. For example the line "Allá arriba en esa loma" carries ten grammatical syllables, but when spoken naturally it sounds like "A lláa rri baen e sa lo ma" which amounts to 8 spoken syllables. The variations based on the word's accents (agudas, graves, and esdrújulas) in the last word of the verse also allows for different numbers of metric syllables:

- If ending in an "aguda" word like "corazón" the line should have 7 metric syllables.
- If ending in a "grave" word like "loma" the line should have 8 metric syllables.
- If ending in an esdrújula word like "brújula" then the line should have 9 metric syllables.

== Poetry ==
"Juyzio hallado y trobado"
"La vida es sueño"

Pedro Calderón de la Barca wrote in décimas some stanzas of Life is a Dream.

Nicomedes Santa Cruz made poems about Afro-Peruvian life and culture in décimas.

== Songs ==
Many songs are in the form of décima. For example, Violeta Parra's Volver a los Diecisiete and 21 son los Dolores.

== Folk singing manifestation ==
External audio
- You may listen to "Décima de los Pueblos de Puerto Rico" here.

A payada is a sung duel of improvised décimas.

== Ecuador ==
The Ecuadorian décima is an oral poetic form that exists among the black population of the Esmeraldas Province. A décima consists of 44 lines, each of which generally has eight syllables. A décima consists of one stanza of four lines, and four more stanzas of ten lines each. Each of the four lines of the first stanza is repeated later in the poem. Sometimes when these lines are repeated, they are slightly altered. Patterns of rhyme and meter are not governed by any particular rules.

During declamation, there is a pause between stanzas, as well as a pause between the fourth and fifth lines of each ten-line stanza. This is reflected in the structure of the poems as well: a transcription of a décima will invariably have a period or a semicolon at the end of the fourth line. Some older decimeros add an additional pause between the eighth and ninth line of each ten-line stanza.

The structure of the décima suggests that it is derived from the Spanish glosa, which also employs eight-syllable lines and a break between the fourth and fifth lines of a ten-line Istanza.

Décimas are generally anonymous. Though many decimeros claim to have composed the décimas they recite, this is rarely the case. One scholar of décimas said he met only one decimero who actually composed his own décimas, and that decimeros living in different areas often claimed to have composed the same poems.

== Sources ==
- Clark, Dorothy Clotelle. "espinela." The New Princeton Encyclopedia of Poetry and Poetics. Princeton, New Jersey: Princeton University Press,1993.
  Cuddon, J. A. A Dictionary of Literary Terms New York: Penguin, 1979.
- Coplas y décimas de la tradición lojana, 1990. [Quito] : Centro de Difusión Cultural, Asociación Lojana, [1991?]. OCLC 27225375.
- Juan García. La poesía negrista en el Ecuador. Esmeraldas, Ecuador: Banco Central del Ecuador, 1982. OCLC 10486497.
- Juan García. Cuentos y decimas afro-esmeraldeñas. Quito, Ecuador : Ediciones Abya-Yala, 1992. OCLC 37807262.
- Juan García Salazar. Los guardianes de la tradición: compositores y decimeros : décimas y argumentos de tradición oral en las comunidades afroecuatorianas de Esmeraldas. Esmeraldas, Ecuador: PRODEPINE, Proyecto de Desarrollo de los Pueblos Indigenas y Negros, 2002. OCLC 230742437.
- Laura Hidalgo Alzamora. Décimas esmeraldeñas. Quito: Libresa, 1995. ISBN 978-9978-80-338-7.
- Ana María Kleymeyer. La décima: fusión y desarrollo cultural en el Afropacífico. Quito, Ecuador: Ediciones Abya-Yala, 2000. ISBN 978-9978-04-609-8.
- Jean Rahier. La décima : poesía oral negra del Ecuador. Quito: Ediciones Abya Yala: Centro Cultural Afro-Ecuatoriana, [1987?]. OCLC 18244100.
