= Edwin Colón Zayas =

Puerto Rican cuatro player

- Born: Edwin Colón Zayas; October 27, 1965 (age 60)
- Origin: Orocovis, Puerto Rico
- Genres: Puerto Rican Folk, bomba, aguinaldos, bolero, Latin pop, acoustic, son, guaguanco
- Occupations: Cuatro player, guitarist, composer, musician, arranger
- Instrument: Cuatro
- Years active: 1980–present

Edwin Colón Zayas (October 27, 1965), is a Puerto Rican cuatro player from Puerto Rico. He joins a large number of Puerto Rican artists, "innovative tradition-bearing," who focus their talents in extolling the virtues of the Puerto Rican creole and Jíbaro way of life.

== Early life ==
Zayas was born on October 27, 1965, in the town of Orocovis, Puerto Rico to a family of musicians and folklorists. He was the eldest of five children. At age six, he began training with the Cuatro and the guitar with his parents. He later taught his brother and two sisters to play several jíbaro instruments, and they have performed with their brother's band.

== Early career ==
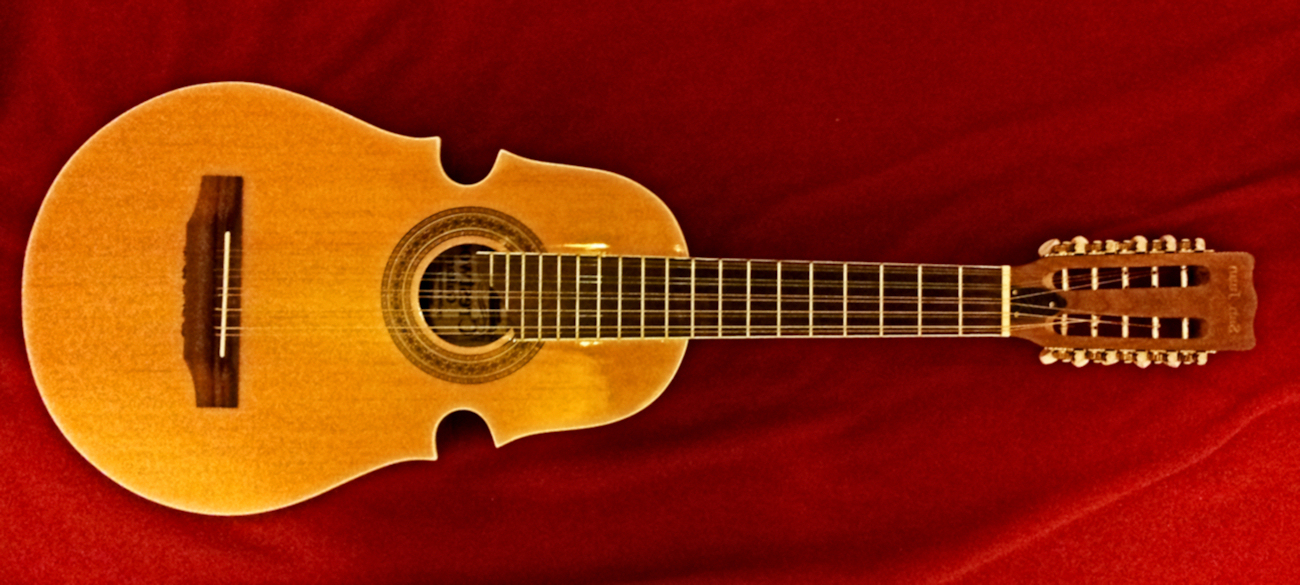
Traditional Puerto Rican cuatro

In the 1980s, Zayas, the cuatrista, and arranger joined bands like the Jataca, Cimarrón, Areyto, Cumbre Criolla, Taller Boricua, the orchestra of Rafael de Jesús, Mapeyé, and the group of Andrés Jiménez. In 1982, he received the award, "Primer Premio Nacional del Cuatro," and his band, the Conjunto Típico de la Montaña, got the Medal of Culture from the Institute of the Puerto Rican Culture.

== The 1990s and Zayas' neo-folklore ==
External audio
- You may listen to "Duelo de Cuatro," Pedrito Guzman and Edwin Colón Zayas on YouTube.

In 1991, Zayas was the leading soloist in the San Juan Pops Orchestra in the Center of Fine Arts. That same year, he offered a Cuatro concert in the International Festival of the Guitar at the University of Puerto Rico. And, was sent to represent Puerto Rico in Mexico at the International Cervantes Festival. The next year, Zayas played his Cuatro with the famous guitar player Paco de Lucía in the Theater La Perla in Ponce as well as in the Center for Fine Arts, an event that coincided with the celebrations of the Fifth Centenary of the Encounter of Two Worlds. In 1994, Zayas and his band, "Taller Campesino," joined with the Smithsonian Folklife Festival for a series of performances at the DC Mall, and followed with a US tour. That year, he also participated in the Banco Popular's Christmas program with a runaway piece called, "Duelo de los Cuatros," with Pedrito Guzmán.

== The 2000s and later ==
In 2008, Zayas received a Latin Grammy nomination for Best Traditional Tropical Album for his album Reafirmación, and in 2009 was awarded a National Heritage Fellowship by the National Endowment of the Arts. Zayas remains at the head of the band "Taller Campesino", which continues to receive awards for its innovations and artistic leadership. While he includes nontraditional instruments to his folk music, he is still "considered by many to be among the purest performers of folk music". Zayas expressed his position about the power of folk culture to transform others: “I can... criollizar [creolize] any international number".

== Partial discography ==
As of 2009, Zayas has recorded 17 solo albums and has performed on, arranged, or directed more than 250 recordings for other Puerto Rican artists.

- El cuatro Más allá de lo imaginable (1988, EC Records)
- Siguiendo hacia lo infinito (1989, EC)
- 100 años con Don Felo (1990, EC)
- En vivo desde el Teatro Tapia (1991, EC)
- 100% puertorriqueño (1992, EC)
- Bien jíbaro: Country Music of Puerto Rico (1993, Rounder Records)
- Descarga (1993, EC)
- El cuatro y la danza puertorriqueña (1993, Disco Hit Records)
- Este es tu Taller Campesino (1994, Disco Hit)
- Morel Campos en tiempo de cuatro (1995, Disco Hit)
- La hora de tu partida (1999)
- Navidad con el Taller Campesino (2000)

== See also ==
- List of Puerto Ricans
- Andrés Jiménez, "el Jíbaro"
- Yomo Toro
- Tomás Rivera Morales
- Puerto Rican cuatro
- Music of Puerto Rico
- Bordonua
- Puerto Rican Tiples
- Iluminado Davila Medina
