= Colombian tiple =

Plucked string instrument

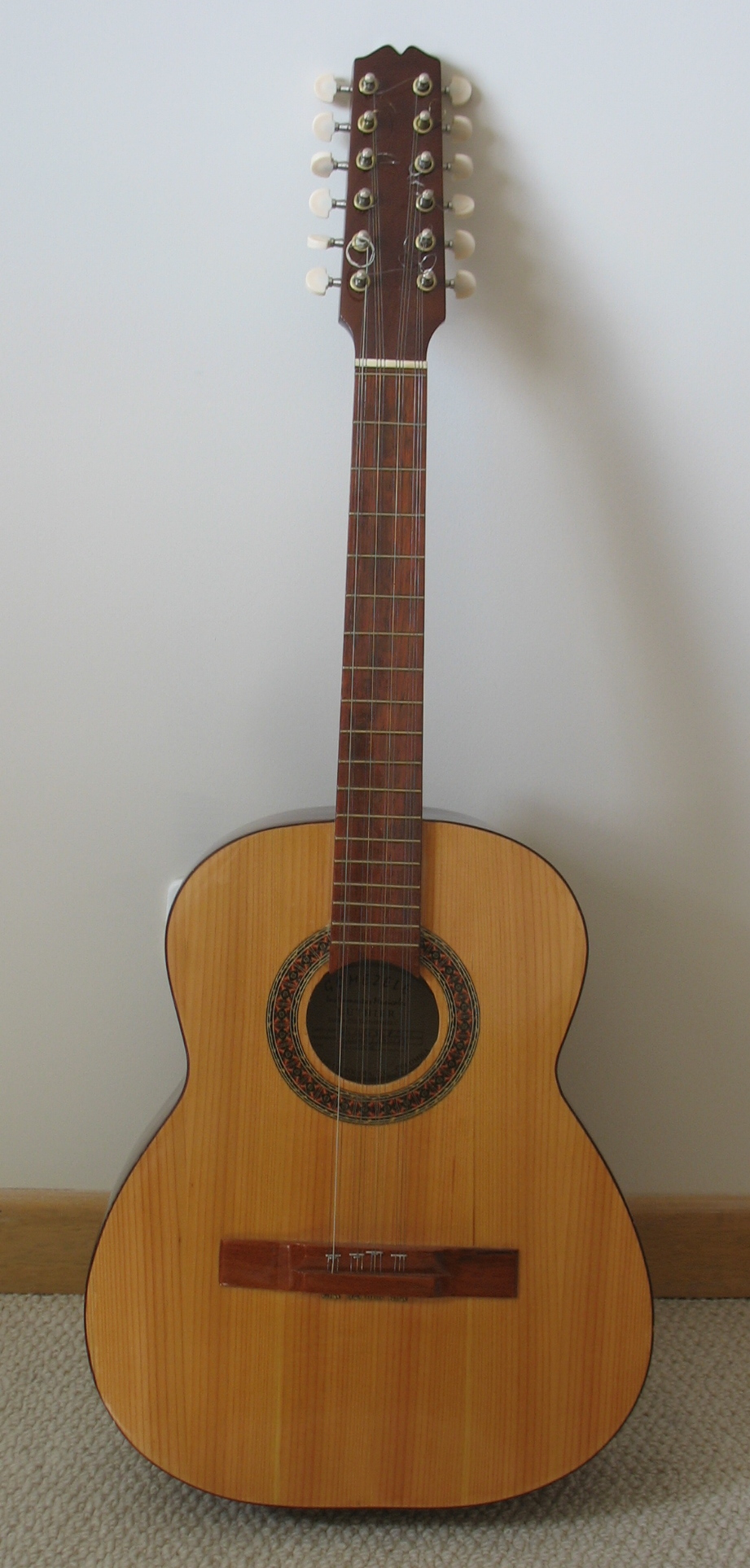
- A tiple

String instrument
- Other names: tiple
- Classification: String instrument (plucked, metal string chordophones usually played with a pick; sometimes by fingerpicking.)
- Hornbostel–Sachs classification: 321.322 (Composite chordophone)

Playing range
- C3 - A5

Related instruments
- Tiple-requinto; American Tiple; Timple

The Colombian tiple (in Spanish: tiple, pronounced: tee-pleh) is a plucked string instrument of the guitar family, common in Colombia where it is considered one of the national instruments. About three-fourths the size of a classical guitar, it has twelve strings set in four triple-strung courses. It is played as a main instrument or as an accompanying instrument to the guitar.

== Etymology ==
According to the RAE the word tiple denotes an acute sound (treble). It also defines tiple as guitars of very acute sound; this, however, is contradictory as today's tiple can't be classified as an instrument of acute sound. The term tiple is also considered the Spanish word for treble. Traditional Colombian tiple should not be confused with the American tiple (aka "Martin" tiple) which are very different instruments in size, stringing, tuning, sound, application and technique.

== History ==
Little is known about the beginnings of the Colombian tiple and its use in Colombia. The first accounts exist in an article published in 1849 by Jose Caicedo Rojas; in it he narrates a story that takes place in Chitaraque, near San Gil, Santander; about some soldiers that deserted the military after they became melancholic during a night of party. In the story he describes the tiple and how it was used to sing coplas.

In his references to the tiple Rojas explains : "In New Granada we have the tiple and the bandola.They are an imitation of the Spanish vihuela". In 1923 well known musician Guillermo Uribe Holguin cites Caicedo's writing during a conference in which he criticizes the Colombian tiple as a poorer version of the Spanish guitar by saying "The tiple is a primitive form of the guitar, in other words, is a guitar without the notes E and A (...)

In 1951 Bogotanian musician Jorge Áñez cites in his book Canciones y recuerdos (Songs and memories) an observation made by professor Robert Pizano in which he points out that Neogranadine painter Gregorio Vasquez Ceballos painted some tiples in the hands of angels inside the dome of the church of Saint Ignace.

Colombian historian priest Jose Ignacio Perdomo Escobar quotes a Jesuit idiom that indicates that by the year 1680 tiples were already sold at stores in the municipality of Topaga, in the Boyaca Department. Such idiom was "guitars and tiples sold to multiply the happiness of the good people". This is supported by information found in the archives at the Cathedral of Bogotá.

Colombian historian Guillermo Hernandez de Alba gives in 1954 a totally different theory in an article published in El Espectador of Bogotá. "At the Canary Islands they have a typical small instrument called timple, it is played as an accompanying instrument...couldn't it be that our tiple is not but the evolution of a Canarian timple?"

Researcher and composer Miguel Angel Martin writes in his book Del Folclor llanero (Folklore from the eastern plains) from 1978:"I believe the tiple was brought to us from the Canary Islands and I believe the first tiples were made at the settlements of Tamara, Morcote, Pauto and Tame in the Casanare".

In 1970 Harry C. Davidson publishes an extensive monograph about the tiple within his book Diccionario Folclorico de Colombia (Colombian dictionary of folklore). In it Davidson analyzes the concepts expressed by Añez about the paintings in Saint Ignace church and he concludes that there aren't enough sources to accept his theories and then he goes to affirm that "this instrument entered the historic heritage of Colombia at the beginning of the 19th century".

This wealth of theories may indicate that it's very likely that throughout the 19th century the tiple was already part of Colombia's culture. There is no clear conclusion on where in Colombia the tiple first originated since the documentation is sketchy. Nevertheless, there is no doubt that the tiple is linked to the Spanish guitar and the timple from the Canary islands.

Today's Colombian tiple is the result of a lengthy modification of guitars brought by the conquistadors to the New World. Historically it is difficult to say precisely what a tiple is since a number of chordophones have adopted such names over the centuries. There exists also the discrepancies in names given to the same instrument in different parts of Colombia. In his book, Cancionero of Antioquia (Chansonnier of Antioquia), author Antonio Jose Restrepo lists chordophones, including the:

- Vihuela
- Cuatro (meaning four, because it had only four strings)
- Guitar
- Vihuela brava (or bandola)
- Tiple (meaning the older five string Colombian instrument)

Five string tiples are now relatively unknown, except for references in historic publications. The four string tiple, however, remains popular in Colombia's eastern plains and in Venezuela.

The immediate predecessor of today's Colombian tiple and requinto is the eight-string tiple. This is supported by evidence found among publications from 1868 and 1877 that intended to teach how to play such instruments. They were edited by Jose Eleuterio Suarez, Jose Viteri and Telesforo D'Aleman. The first one of this publications is Metodo facil para aprender los tonos del tiple (Easy method to learn the tones of a tiple) and can currently be found at the Luis Ángel Arango and National Libraries of Bogotá as historic material.

In 1868 Jose Viteri publishes a collection called Metodo completo para aprender a tocar tiple o bandola sin necesidad de maestro (Complete method to learn to play the tiple or bandola without a teacher) in which he explains how at the time some authors used the term bandola and tiple interchangeably.

During the 20th century the tiple changed to its current appearance. In the first years of the 20th century, the tiple was still evolving. Makers added strings to keep the harmony of the notes, resulting in four courses: two strings - three strings - three strings - two strings.

In 1915, writer Santos Cifuentes wrote an article titled "Hacia el americanismo musical - La musica en Colombia" (Towards a musical Americanism - Music in Colombia) In it, he mentions the Colombian tiple. Unfamiliar with the instrument Cifuentes points out a couple of flaws, but his writing is of historic value since it explains that the tiple has by this time 12 strings. (The ten string tiple still survives as the "American Tiple", often also known as the "Martin Tiple", after the chief manufacturer of this type in the states, the Martin Guitar Company. Besides having fewer strings the American Tiple differs in being smaller than the tiple Colombiano, nearer the size of a baritone ukulele, than a guitar.)

The final step towards today's tiple takes place in the switch from a wooden machine head to a mechanical one with metal gears allowing the player to find the correct tuning not unlike today's guitars.

A photograph from 1921 reveals the "Colombian Lira" with the shape it is known today. After this time the Colombian tiple maintains its current form but the manufacturing process improves over the years producing better quality tiples reaching a level of high quality such as the ones currently manufactured by Alberto Paredes in Bogotá or Carlos Norato and Hernando Guzman in Cali among others around the country.

=== Timeline of the tiple ===
Timeline of the Colombian tiple (Click "show" or "hide" to toggle this table)
Year	Event	Image
1502–1550	Guitars and vihuelas arrive to the New Kingdom of Granada	
1542	The word tiple appears in the American continent	
1571	It is known that there are vihuelas in Tunja played by Jorge Voto	
1585	The word tiple is printed on the sheet music of the Cathedral of Bogotá to designate voices and instruments of an acute sound	
1645	Among the instruments of the Jesuit mission in Topaga it is found that vihuelas and discantes are different kind of instruments.	
1746	The tiple is mentioned for the first time in Popayan to designate a chordophone different from the guitar	
1813–1870	The tiples are mentioned in numerous literary works	
1818	The Norato family establishes in the municipality of Chiquinquira as a manufacturer of tiples	
1845	First pictorial representations of tiples found in watercolors	
1849	The first article describing a tiple is published. There are three varieties. One with four strings, one with five strings and one with eight strings all of them paired.	
1868	First learning method published.	
1890–1901	Tiple continues with eight strings. The bandola adopts its pear-shaped shape.	
1907	D'Aleman method for learning to play ten and twelve strings is published.	
1915	The tiple reaches its final configuration with twelve strings	
1916	First photograph of a tiple with mechanical machine heads.	

== Description ==
As a relative of the guitar the Colombian tiple is similar in appearance although slightly smaller (about 18%) than a standard classical guitar. The typical fretboard scale is about 530 mm (just under 21 inches), and the neck joins the body at the 12th fret. There are 12 strings, grouped in four tripled courses. It is typically built with many materials also used for guitars: the sound box for instance is often made of walnut or cedar and the neck is usually made of cedar. Frets were traditionally made of red or yellow copper, but in modern instruments brass or steel is more common. The stringing pattern constitutes one of the main differences between the Colombian tiple and other chordophones such as the twelve string guitar: the metal strings are laid out in 4 courses of 3 strings each (triple strung courses).

David Pelham says of the Colombian tiple:

"The tiple is a Colombian adaptation of the Renaissance Spanish vihuela brought to the New World in the 16th century by the Spanish conquistadors. At the end of the 19th century, it evolved to its present shape. Its twelve strings are arranged in four groups of three: the first group consists of three steel strings tuned to E, the second, third and fourth groups have a copper string in the middle of two steel strings. The central ones are tuned one octave lower than the surrounding strings of the group. This arrangement produces the set of harmonics that gives the instrument its unique voice."

Outside of Colombia the "copper" strings are more often standard brass or bronze wound steel guitar strings.

== Tuning ==
Traditional tuning from lowest to highest course is C F A D. The outer two strings of each of course is tuned an octave higher than the middle string in the course, giving C4 C3 C4 • F4 F3 F4 • A4 A3 A4 • D4 D4 D4. An 18 or 19 fret fingerboard gives the tiple Colombiano a range of about 2-2/3 octaves, from C3 - G#5 (or A5).

Modern players often use an alternate tuning in which the courses are tuned a whole step higher, like the upper four strings of the modern guitar or like a Baritone ukulele: D G B E. With the octave strings this gives: D4 D3 D4 • G4 G3 G4 • B4 B3 B4 • E4 E4 E4; however, the B4's in the second course can be problematic (e.g., strings break). To address this problem either the second course strings may all be tuned to unison B3's, or the instrument may be tuned a half-step or whole-step lower (essentially traditional tuning), and a capo placed on the first or second fret to bring the instrument back up to guitar pitch, or have a shorter scale length, and/or thinner strings like .007, .006, or .005.

The Colombian tiple is considered essentially a concert pitch instrument (in the key of C), although it is, like the guitar, notated one octave higher than the actual sound.

Tiple strings layout (Click "show" or "hide" to toggle this table)
Quality		Sound		Approx Diameter	
		Traditional	Modern	inches	millimeters
a.First course	3 steel strings	D4	E4	0.009 to 0.012	0.229 to 0.305
b.Second course	2 plain steel strings on sides	A4	B4	0.007 to 0.009	0.168 to 0.229
b.Second course	1 central copper or steel wound string	A3	B3	0.018	0.457
c.Third course	2 plain steel strings on sides	E4	G4	0.008 to 0.010	0.203 to 0.254
c.Third course	1 central copper or bronze wound string	E3	G3	0.020 to 0.022	0.508 to 0.559
d.Fourth course	2 plain steel strings on sides	C4	D4	0.010 to 0.014	0.254 to 0.356
d.Fourth course	1 central bronze wound string	C3	D3	0.024 to 0.028	0.610 to 0.711

== Playing a Colombian tiple ==
As with most chordophones of the guitar family, the Colombian tiple can be played either by strumming with the fingers or with a plectrum or a combination of both.

Speaking of playing the Colombian tiple, Harry Davidson said:

"The secret of playing the tiple lies in the right hand. Producing the tones with the left hand in a more or less appropriate and fast way is something that even a paraplegic can achieve with acceptable efficacy. But to pamper it, caressing its strings in a loving way, stomp it creating wells of charming silence, to play it with bravado in joropos and torbellinos, to pick it between singing and singing carrying the melody. That, dear reader, demands more than skills, a special gift, a unique magic that very few have. In it the game of the wrist plays a role, the unfolding of the fingers as a hand fan, the sitting of the palm of the hand that falls on the strings pulsating of emotion, the nails that scratch off the miracle of the notes. To make a tiple make noises is something anyone can achieve, but to make it speak, laugh, sing, moan, cry..that can be achieved not by the one that wants to do it but the one that can do it."

== Learning ==
As of today the learning process varies and they are many. Since 1936 some methods have been published in the form of books or booklets. Many learn to play it from their parents and grandparents as part of a family tradition that in some cases is also a source of income as tiples are popular in trios or serenades.

== Culture ==
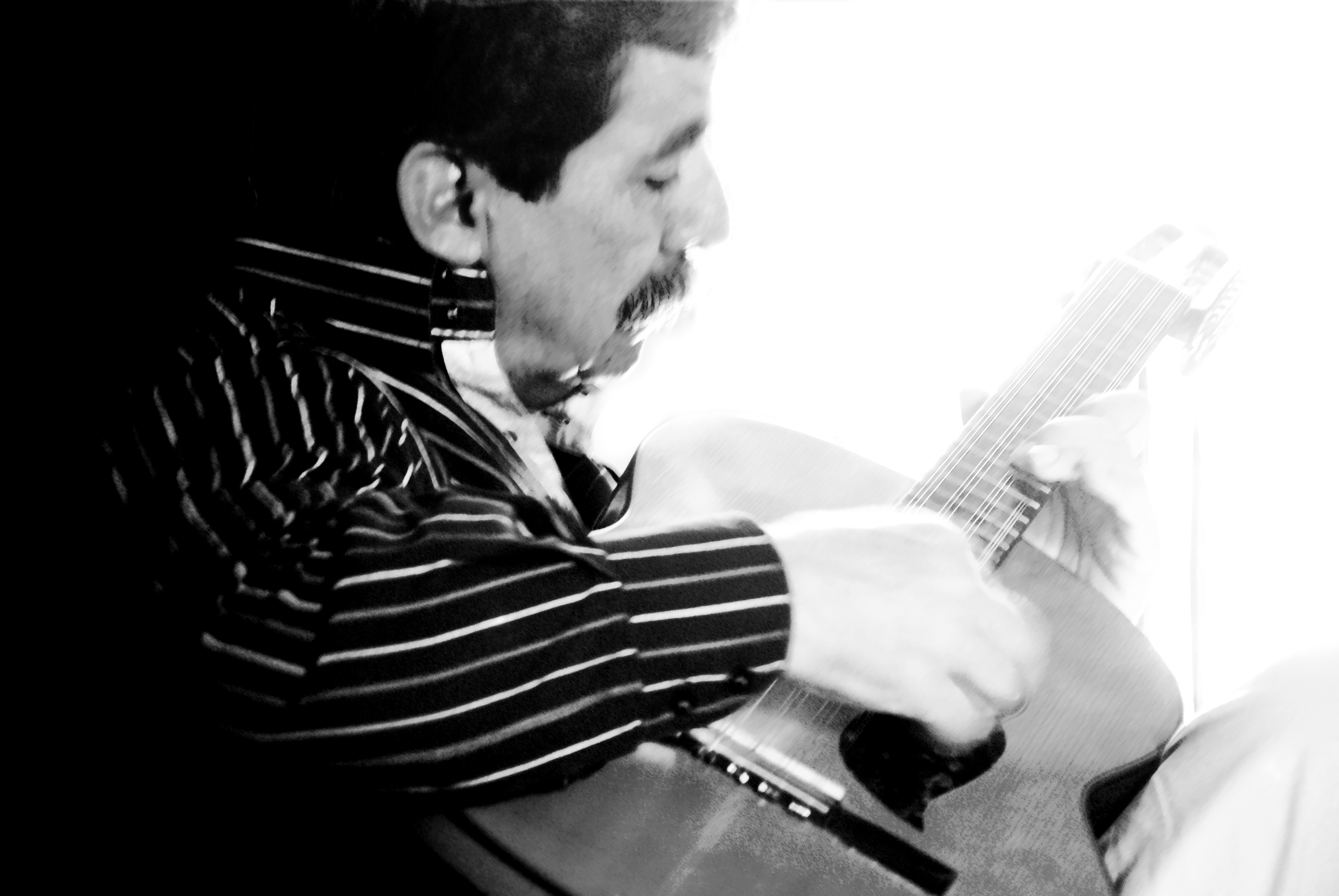
Artist Pedro Nel Martinez playing a Colombian tiple

The tiple is used for many traditional Colombian musics including bambucos and pasillos, where it serves both as an accompanying instrument and for soloing. One of the prominent composer of tiple music is Pacho Benavides.

Today the tiple is seen as an instrument linked to the folklore of rural Colombia where it remains popular, although it has been used by modern players for other genres such as jazz. The tiple had humble beginnings as an instrument of people from lower economic classes. It became more important over time, and eventually was accepted as an instrument on the level of the guitar. Demographically, the tiple was rooted to the mestizo population of the Viceroyalty of New Granada where it was looked down upon by the whites of unmixed heritage.

In reference to the social difference between the tiple and the guitar, Antonio Jose Restrepo wrote: "But [the tiple] was pervasive among the bronze-colored people, the ones with working cloth and ruana, [with] a bag plentiful of gossip, [and with] a machete tied to the waist,[with] stick of guasco or verraquillo hanging on the arm, eye of the peasant, [who is] sometimes barefooted, sometimes with espadrilles, [with] a hat of cane of iraca that is maliciously tilted to one side, under the brim of a broken crown; it stayed always with them, I say, the fat bellied vihuela, tiple, always in company of the tambourine (in case a party were to take place)."

In Santander, by 1840 the tiple was still played in "third class dances"—parties for people of lower stock. It was usually accompanied by a tambourine. It wasn't until Tomas Carrasquilla's novel Frutos de mi tierra (Fruits of My Land) that the tiple was first mentioned. In that novel, he writes that the tiple was played by every artist whereas the guitars were still played only at the jockey club in Medellín.

At the southwestern of Antioquia a small municipality became the first one in the country to include a tiple in its coat of arms. This is the result of many artists from this region who saw the tiple with endearment and embrace it as a symbol of their cultural heritage.

== Variants ==
A number of instruments bear the name "tiple", some of which are not closely related to the tiple Colombiano. The American tiple, for example, created by the R.R. Martin Company in 1919, is sized closer to a tenor ukulele, and has ten strings, grouped 2-3-3-2. The modern variant most closely related to the Colombian tiple is the requinto tiple.

=== Requinto Tiple ===
The Colombian requinto tiple (tiple Colombiano requinto) is often simply called tiple requinto. This instrument is about 10-15% smaller than the tiple Colombiano, and is often made in more of a violin or "hourglass" shape (similar to the Puerto Rican cuatro). Like the tiple Colombiano it has twelve strings arranged into four three-string courses; however, strings within each triple course are tuned in unison, giving either a C4 C4 C4 • E4 E4 E4 • A4 A4 A4 • D4 D4 D4 tuning (traditional), or a D4 D4 D4 • G4 G4 G4 • B4 B4 B4 • E4 E4 E4 tuning (modern). These differences give it a generally thinner, higher-pitched sound than the tiple Colombiano, even though most of its tuning is in the same range as the larger instrument. The requinto tiple uses a reentrant tuning, in that the first course is tuned to a lower pitch than some of the courses "below" it (see tuning table).

Requinto Tiple strings layout (Click "show" or "hide" to toggle this table)
Quality		Sound		Approx Diameter	
		Traditional	Modern	inches	millimeters
a.First course	3 plain steel strings	D4	E4	0.009 to 0.011	0.229 to 0.279
b.Second course	3 plain steel strings	A4	B4	0.0065 to 0.007	0.165 to 0.178
c.Third course	3 plain steel strings	E4	G4	0.0075 to 0.009	0.191 to 0.229
d.Fourth course	3 plain steel strings	C4	D4	0.009 to 0.012	0.229 to 0.304

== See also ==
- Stringed instrument tunings
