= Guitarro =

Guitarro could refer to:

- Guitarro (instrument), a type of baroque guitar in Spain
- Guitarro, a type of ray in the guitarfish family
- USS Guitarro, the name of multiple ships in the United States Navy

== See also ==
- Guitaro
