= Tiple =

Fretted string instrument

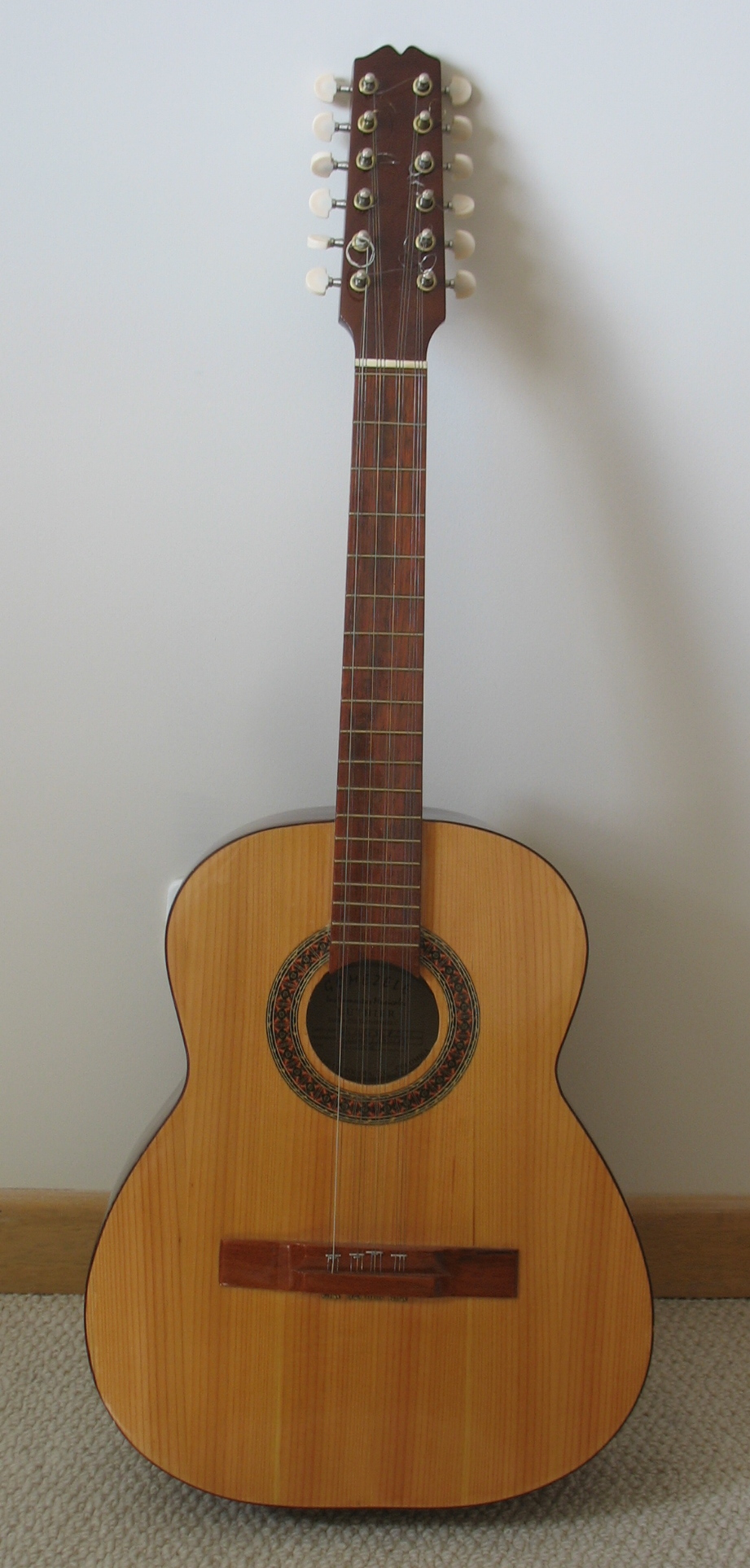
- Tiple, classic 12-string musical instrument

String instrument
- Classification: String instrument (plucked)
- Hornbostel–Sachs classification: 321.322 (Composite chordophone)

Playing range
- C3 - A5

Related instruments
- Colombian tiple, Timple

A tiple (Spanish pronunciation: [ˈtiple], literally treble or soprano), is a particular type of guitar, typically with 10 or 12 strings but sometimes fewer, and is built in several distinct regional styles. A tiple player is called a tiplista. The first written mention of an instrument called "tiple" comes from musicologist Pablo Minguet e Irol in 1752. The 12-string Colombian tiple is considered the country's national instrument. The Puerto Rican tiple characteristically has fewer than twelve strings, as do those from Cuba, Mallorca, and North America.

== Tiple family ==
=== Colombian tiple ===
The Colombian tiple (in Spanish: tiple) is an instrument of the guitar family, similar in appearance although slightly smaller (about 18%) than a standard classical guitar. The typical fretboard scale is about 530 mm (just under 21 inches), and the neck joins the body at the 12th fret. There are 12 strings, grouped in four tripled courses. Traditional tuning from lowest to highest course is C F A D, although many modern players tune the instrument like the upper four strings of the modern guitar or like a Baritone ukulele: D G B E. The outer two strings of each of the three lowest triple courses are tuned an octave higher than the middle string in the course (giving C4 C3 C4 • F4 F3 F4 • A4 A3 A4 • D4 D4 D4 in traditional tuning, or D4 D3 D4 • G4 G3 G4 • B4 B3 B4 • E4 E4 E4 in modern tuning). An 18 or 19 fret fingerboard give the tiple Colombiano a range of about 2-2/3 octaves, from C3 - G#5 (or A5). The tiple is used for many traditional Colombian music genres including bambucos and pasillos. It serves both as an accompanying instrument and for soloing. One of the main composers of tiple music is Pacho Benavides.

David Pelham says of the Colombian tiple: "The tiple is a Colombian adaptation of the Renaissance Spanish vihuela brought to the New World in the 16th century by the Spanish conquistadors. At the end of the 19th century, it evolved to its present shape. Its twelve strings are arranged in four groups of three: the first group consists of three steel strings tuned to E, the second, third and fourth groups have a copper string in the middle of two steel strings. The central ones are tuned one octave lower than the surrounding strings of the group. This arrangement produces the set of harmonics that gives the instrument its unique voice. Outside of Colombia the "copper" strings are more often standard brass or bronze wound steel guitar strings.

Another variant, the tiple Colombiano requinto, is often simply called tiple requinto. This instrument is about 10-15% smaller than the tiple Colombiano, and the central octave strings of the smaller instrument are tuned in unison, giving either a C4 C4 C4 • F4 F4 F4 • A4 A4 A4 • D4 D4 D4 tuning (traditional), or a D4 D4 D4 • G4 G4 G4 • B4 B4 B4 • E4 E4 E4 tuning (modern). The tiple requinto is sometimes made in more of a violin or "hourglass" shape, than a guitar shape. These differences give it a generally thinner, higher-pitched sound than the tiple Colombiano, even though most of its tuning is in the same range as the larger instrument.

=== Puerto Rican tiples ===
The tiple is the smallest of the three string instruments of Puerto Rico that make up the orquesta jibara (i.e., the Cuatro, the tiple and the Bordonua). According to investigations made by Jose Reyes Zamora, the tiple in Puerto Rico dates back to the 18th century. It is believed to have evolved from the Spanish guitarrillo. There was never a standard for the tiple and as a result there are many variations throughout the island of Puerto Rico. Most tiples have four or five strings and most tiple requintos have three strings. Some tiples have as many as 6 strings and as few as a single string, though these types are rare.

The main types of tiple in Puerto Rico are:

- Tiple requinto de la montaña - a tiny version of the tiple doliente with only three strings. It is usually smaller than 12 inches.
- Tiple requinto costanero - a smaller version of the tiplón with only three strings. It is usually about 15 inches in length.
- Tiple doliente - this tiple has 5 single strings and is the most common used today. It is usually about 15 inches in length.
- Tiplón or tiple con macho - a larger version of the tiple with a fifth string peg like an American banjo, located on its neck. It is usually about 21 inches in length.
- Tiple grande de Ponce - the largest version (about 21 inches in length) with 5 strings. It is considered a link between tiples and bordonuas. It is sometimes also called "bordonua chiquita" (small bordonua).

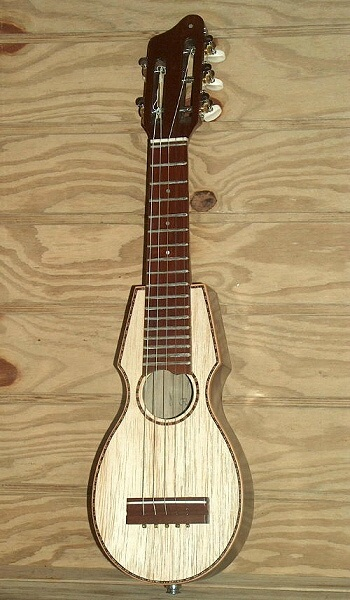
Puerto Rican Tiple Doliente

The tiple that is now most often played in Puerto Rico is the tiple doliente. It has recently acquired a more or less fixed body shape narrowing at the top and having 5 metal strings (see the accompanying photo). It is usually made like the cuatro, so either constructed like a guitar, or from one piece of wood hollowed out. The bottom half of the body is rounded like a guitar, however the top half is square, or triangular. All other features (like neck and bridge) resemble the construction of a normal Spanish guitar. The peghead has tuning machines either from the side or from the back. The strings of the tiple doliente are tuned: E3 A3 D4 G4 C5.

=== Tiple Venezolano ===
This tiple from Venezuela, looks like a smaller version of the Colombian Tiple. It has 4 sets of triple strings and is also known as the Guitarro, Guitarro Segundo, and the Segunda Guitarra. There is another tiple played in Venezuela but is a member of the Venezuelan Cuatro family of instruments, also called a tiple and known as the Cinco y Medio or Cinco. It is much like the Cuatro but it has 5 strings instead of four.

=== Tiple de Menorca ===
On the Spanish Balearic island of Menorca, a tiple is an instrument with five single nylon strings.

=== Tiple Cubano ===
A tiple Cubano, has five doubled courses of strings, ten in total.

=== Tiple de Santo Domingo ===
The tiple de Santo Domingo, also known as tiple Dominicano or tiple, also has five doubled courses, for ten in total. The strings are steel. It is tuned C4, F4, A#4, D5, G5. All of the courses are tuned in unison.

=== Tiple Peruano ===
Peru has a tiple with four single or doubled steel strings. It is tuned A3, E4, B4, F#5 (like a Mandolin with a capo on the 2nd Fret).

=== Tiples in Uruguay and Argentina ===
In Uruguay and Argentina, sometimes the requinto guitar is called a tiple.

== Other versions ==
=== U.S. / N. American / Martin tiple ===
The North American tiple was designed in 1919 by the Nazareth, Pennsylvania-based guitar company C. F. Martin & Company for the William J. Smith Co. in New York and was most popular through the 1920s-1940s ukulele craze. This tiple is similar in length to what became the tenor ukulele, but the tiple has a deeper body. (Martin did not introduce its four string tenor ukulele until other manufacturers were making that body size in the 1920s.) Unlike a ukulele, the Martin tiple has ten steel strings in four mixed-octave courses of 2, 3, 3, and 2 strings. Manufactured for a half century, the Martin tiple was used in jazz, blues and old-time country bands, and as a louder-volume ukulele. It was tuned similarly to a D-tuned ukulele:

A4 A3 • D4 D3 D4 • F#4 F#3 F#4 • B3 B3 (wound octave-lower strings are A3, D3, and F#3).

Ohana, a more recent manufacturer of similar instruments, recommends tuning their copies of the Martin a full tone lower, as mentioned below, similar to contemporary ukuleles.

Martin produced mahogany and rosewood bodied tiples, following a model-identification system similar to its guitars: T-15 and T-17, mahogany top, back and sides; T-18, spruce top, mahogany back and sides; T-28, spruce top, rosewood back and sides; T-45, spruce top, rosewood back and sides, fancy abalone inlay. Martin's tiple production continued off-and-on into the 1970s.

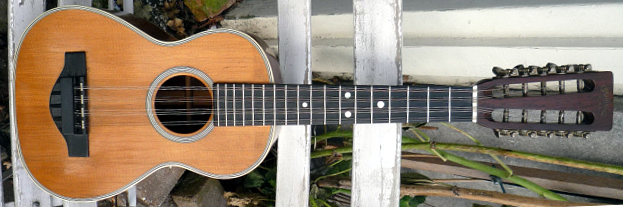
Martin tiple

Similar instruments were made by Regal, Harmony, Lyon & Healy, Oscar Schmidt, D'Angelico and other companies during the early decades of Martin production.

In the 21st century, the Ohana ukulele company began manufacturing an all-mahogany tiple similar to the Martin, but calling it "a vintage ukulele inspired by the Columbian (sic) Tiple." The company recommended tuning with the lowest note a C. (G3 G4 – C4 C3 C4 – E4 E3 E4 – A4 A4)

In addition to its original ukulele-style tuning (above), the American tiple sometimes has been tuned like the upper four courses of the guitar, presumably with special sets of strings.

Martin tiple dimensions

Overall length: 27 1/4″

Body length: 12 1/16″

Bout width, upper: 6 5/8″
Bout width, lower: 8 15/16″

Body depth, upper: 3 1/16″

Body depth, lower: 3 9/16″

Neck width at nut: 1 1/2″
Fingerboard width: 1 3/4″ at 12th fret

Sound hole diameter: 2 5/8″
Scale length: 17″

North American tiple performers:

- Four Virginians
- Cats and the Fiddle
- Spirits of Rhythm
- Timmie Rogers
- Ed Askew
- Golden Melody Boys, aka Georgia Melody Boys

=== Electric tiples ===
Electric tiples usually follow either the Colombian (12-string) or "Martin" (10-string) tuning and string arrangement.

== Related instruments ==
=== Spanish tiples ===
In Spain there are similar instruments. This tiny guitar has four strings and is found in Menorca. Other types of small guitars in Spain are the guitarra, guitarro and guitarrico.

=== Portuguese tiples ===
Related Portuguese instruments are the cavaquinho or braguinha and the rajâo. The braguinha and the rajâo taken to Hawai'i by Portuguese immigrants from Madeira are the forerunners of the ukulele.

=== Canary Island timple ===
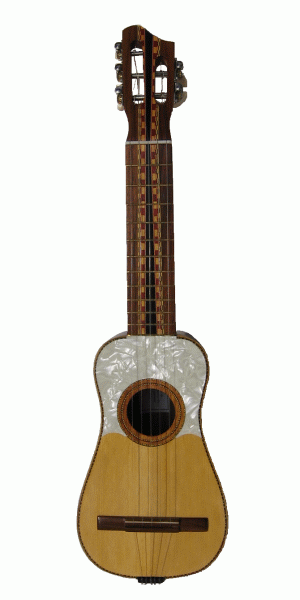
Timple seen from front

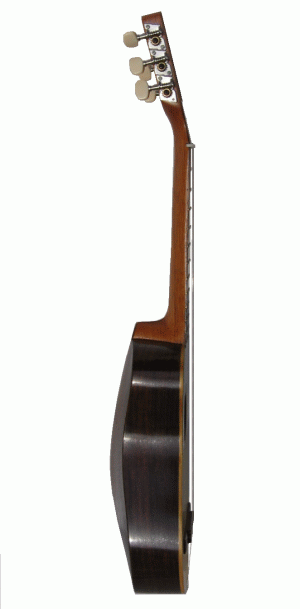
Timple seen from side

Migrating from North Africa in the 16th century to the Canary Islands and then on to Murcia, the timple has become the traditional instrument of the Canaries. In La Palma and in the north of the island of Tenerife some players omit the fifth string, tuning the timple like a ukulele, though nowadays this is often seen as non-standard by players in other regions where five strings are preferred. The popular tiple tuning is GCEAD.

== Other instruments ==
The word "tiple" basically means "treble" or "high pitched", and has been used occasionally for the names of other instruments not directly members of the tiple-family proper. One such is the Marxochime Hawaiian tiple, which bears no resemblance to the traditional tiples, but looks like (and is) a variety of zither. It is played with a combination of plucking, strumming, and playing with a slide similar to a lap steel guitar. The instrument is one of many zither variants marketed within the United States during the early 20th century, of which only the autoharp ever achieved lasting popularity. The instrument, also known as the "Tremola", carries the "Hawaiian tiple" name solely for marketing purposes, as interest in Hawaiian music and culture was high in mainland America during the period when the instrument was marketed.

== Resources and sources ==
Colombian tiple:

- Puerta's tremendous tiple touch
- Colombian luthier Alberto Paredes
- Paredes, A., Mottola, R.M. “Construction of the Colombian Tiple”, American Lutherie #90, 2007, p. 40.

Puerto Rican tiple:

- The Puerto Rican Tiple
- The Tiples of Puerto Rico
- ATLAS of Plucked Instruments
- El Tiple Puertorriqueño (In Spanish)

Spanish tiple:

- (In Spanish)
- (In Spanish)

Timple Canario:

- El Timple (In Spanish)
- Learn TIMPLE (Spanish)

Tiple Cubano:

- Miguel Teurbe Tolón y de la Guardia. (Matanzas, 1820-1857)

Tiple Dominicano, Tiple Argentino, Banjo Tiple, Tiple Uruguayo, and the Tiple Venezolano:

- TIPLES EN OTROS PAISES (In Spanish)
- Ficha del Tiple (In Spanish)

Marxochime Hawaiian Tiple:

- Marxochime Hawaiian Tiple
