= Requinto =

Smaller version of a musical instrument

The term requinto is used in both Spanish and Portuguese to mean a smaller, higher-pitched version of another instrument. Thus, there are requinto guitars, drums, and several wind instruments.

== Wind instruments ==
Requinto, when used in relation to a clarinet, refers to the E-flat clarinet, also known as requint in Valencian language.

Requinto can also mean a high-pitched flute (akin to a piccolo), or the person who plays it. In Galicia, the word may refer to a wooden fife-like instrument held sideways.

== Small guitar ==
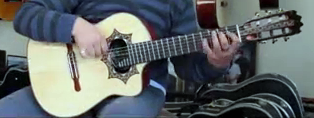
A requinto guitar being played.

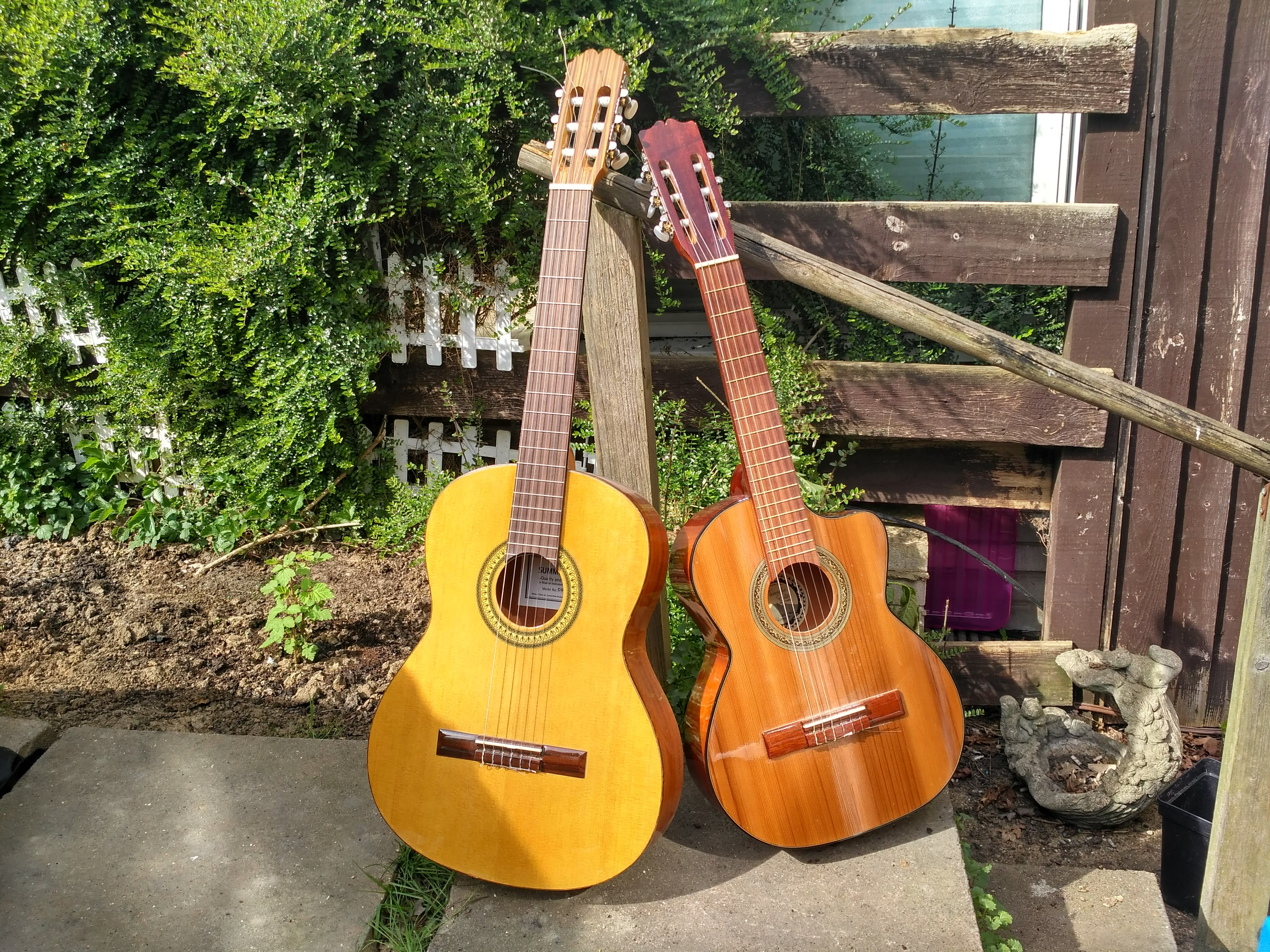
A classical guitar (left) and a requinto guitar (right)

The requinto guitar has six nylon strings with a scale length of 530 to 540 millimetres (20.9 to 21.3 in), which is about 18% smaller than a standard guitar scale. Requintos are tuned: A2-D3-G3-C4-E4-A4 (one fourth higher than the standard classical guitar).

It was made popular throughout the 1940s by Mexican guitarist/vocalist Alfredo Gil of romantic music trio "Los Panchos." Requinto guitars are also used throughout Latin America.

Requintos made in Mexico have a deeper body than a standard classical guitar (110 millimetres (4.3 in) as opposed to 105 millimetres (4.1 in)). Requintos made in Spain tend to be of the same depth as the standard classical.

== Other stringed instruments ==
=== Portuguese violas ===
Many Portuguese violas, such as the Viola braguesa, have smaller requinto versions also, called 'requinta'. The Viola Braguesa Requinta is tuned: A4 A3, C5 C4, F5 F4, C#5 C#5, E5 E5. This tuning is a fifth above the standard Viola braguesa.

=== Puerto Rican tiples ===
In Puerto Rico, there are many small instruments called Tiple Requinto. These usually have 3 or 4 strings. See Tiple (Puerto Rico).

=== Colombian tiple requinto ===
The Colombian Requinto Tiple (or Tiple Colombiano Requinto) is smaller than a standard Tiple Colombiano, and is sometimes shaped more like a violin or Puerto Rican cuatro, or sometimes like a small guitar (smaller than the standard Tiple). It also has 12 strings and is also triple-strung, but the higher pitch means that all of the strings in the courses are tuned to unison. It is tuned D4 D4 D4, G4 G4 G4, B4 B4 B4, E4 E4 E4.

=== Guitarro or guitarrico aragonés ===
The Guitarro aragonés, from Aragón, Spain, looks like a small guitar. It has 4 or 5 strings and is usually tuned A-D-G-C-E-A . The 4 string is also usually tuned E-C#-A–D

=== Requinto jarocho ===
The requinto jarocho or guitarra de son is a plucked string instrument, played usually with a special pick. It is a four- or five-stringed instrument that has originated from Veracruz, Mexico.

The requinto is used in conjunto jarocho ensembles. In the absence of the arpa, the requinto typically introduces the melodic theme of the son and then continues by providing a largely improvised counterpoint to the vocal line. See Requinto jarocho.

== Small drum ==
The requinto drum is used in the Puerto Rican folk genre plena, wherein it is a small conical hand drum that improvises over the other drum rhythms.

== See also ==
- Cavaquinho
