= Tomás Rivera Morales =

Puerto Rican musician

Tomás Rivera Morales,
- Also known as: "Maso Rivera"
- Born: November 13, 1927; Toa Alta, Puerto Rico
- Died: February 4, 2001 (aged 73) San Juan, Puerto Rico
- Genre: Jíbaro music
- Occupations: Musician, composer
- Instrument: Cuatro

Tomás Rivera Morales, simply known as "Maso Rivera" (November 13, 1927 – February 4, 2001), was a Puerto Rican musician and a major exponent of Puerto Rico's Jíbaro music. Rivera composed over 1,000 instrumental compositions for the Cuatro, Puerto Rico's national instrument.

== Early years ==
Rivera was born in the barrio Galateo in the town of Toa Alta. His parents were Ramón Rivera Nieves and Secundina Morales Rolón. When he was five years old, under his mother's encouragement, he began to play the cuatro. The cuatro is a Puerto Rican indigenous instrument derivate from the guitar family. It is smaller than the guitar and originally had four strings evolving to its modern version of 5 pairs of strings. Rivera built his first cuatro when he was nine years old. His first teacher was Felipe Morales Rolon, Rivera's uncle and Puerto Rican cuatro player and maker. Even though he did not know how to read music, he was a good listener, and learned how to play whole musical compositions by ear.

While Rivera was in the sixth grade, his family found themselves in a difficult financial situation, and he was forced to leave school. He worked with his father on a farm, and helped his mother in a small family-owned store, where he found the time to play the cuatro. He was often asked by the local neighbors to play his instrument at parties and funerals.

== Musical career ==
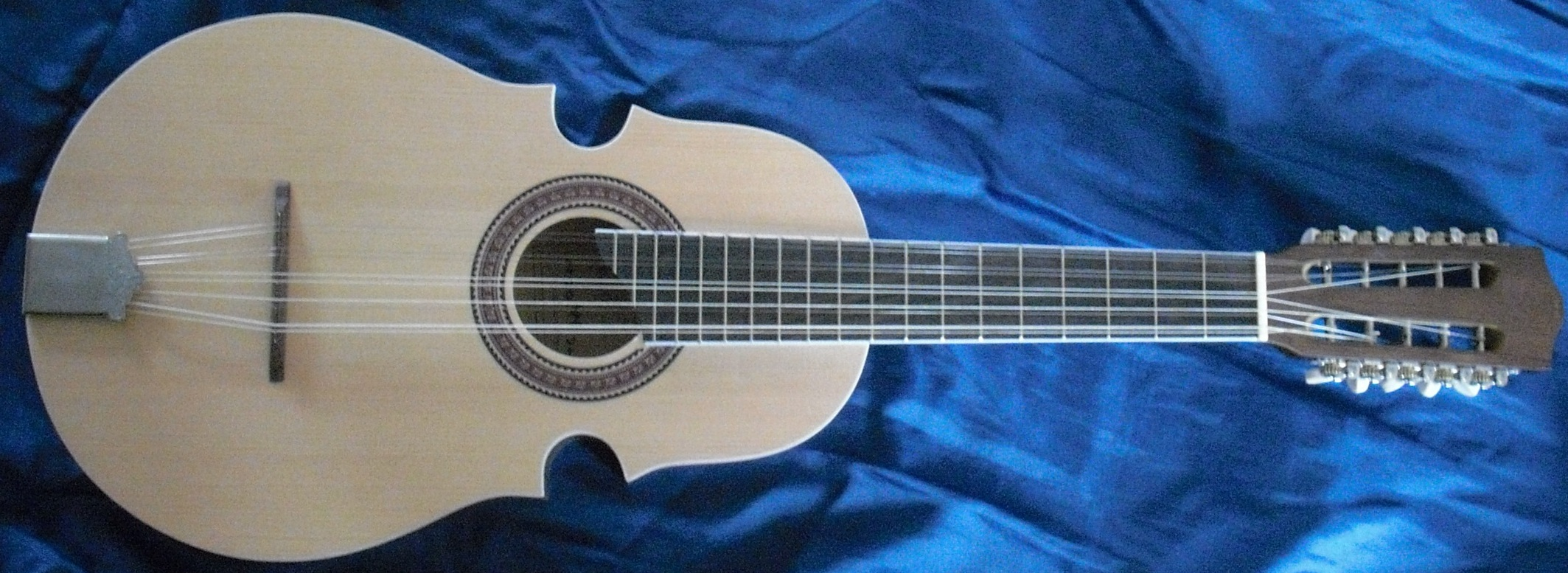
A Puerto Rican Cuatro

When drafted into the United States Army in 1950, Rivera took along his cuatro instrument, with which he entertained the troops overseas during his free time. Upon his honorable discharge from the Army in 1954, Rivera returned to Puerto Rico.

Rivera began to write musical compositions, and his first was titled Sobre mis Colinas. He joined other musicians of typical genres from Puerto Rico, such as Florencio "Ramito" Morales Ramos, Jesús "Chuito de Bayamon" Sanchez Erazo, and Guzmán Rosario. He befriended Abelardo Díaz Alfaro, who played an important role in the development of his musical potential.

Rafael Quiñones Vidal, a pioneer in Puerto Rico's television, became aware of Rivera's musical talent and introduced him to the Puerto Rican public via television and radio. Soon, he was serving as the master of ceremonies of various radio programs such as Maratón, La Infancia and Radio Borinquen.

In the mid-1950s, Rivera went on a musical tour with Ramito and served as a goodwill ambassador of the Jibaro music in New York City, with presentations in such places as the Teatro Puerto Rico. He returned to Puerto Rico and married Carmen Rosado, with whom he had two children, named Carmencita and Edwin Tomás.

Rivera composed more than 1,000 instrumental compositions for the cuatro, including the danzas "A mi Madre" and "Nélida", also the décima Lo que Dios me ha Dado. His musical contributions were primarily in the fields of jibaro music, but he interpreted with equal dexterity most of the other Afro-Caribbean and Latin American genres popular in the last few decades.

== Later years ==
Rivera was very innovative using cuatros of different sizes and shapes called 'tiples'. While he was alive, Puerto Rican Baseball Hall of Famer Roberto Clemente presented him with one of his baseball bats. Upon Clemente's death in a plane crash in 1971, Rivera asked a local instruments luthier to assemble a cuatro out of that same bat, which he called "bate cuatro" (bat cuatro).

Rivera died on February 4, 2001, in San Juan, Puerto Rico. He was buried at the Puerto Rico National Cemetery in Bayamón, Puerto Rico. During his lifetime, he had been the subject of numerous tributes. After his death, his hometown of Toa Alta honored his memory by naming a middle school and the Municipal Theater after him, and by commissioning a statue in his likeness.

In 2021 Tomás Rivera Morales was posthumously inducted to the Puerto Rico Veterans Hall of Fame.

== Musical compositions ==
External audio
- You may listen to Rivera play the "Cuatro" on YouTube.

Among his many musical compositions were the following:

- Maso Rivera vs. Santos Rolón y sus Conjuntos de Cuerdas
- Maso Instrumental
- Felicitaciones Cantan: Juaniquillo, Paquito, y Luisito con Maso Rivera
- Trullando por San Juan con Maso Rivera y Nieves Quintero
- Mi Puerto Rico Querido: Maso Rivera y su Conjunto de Cuerdas
- Aguinaldos con Sinfonía: Canta el Indio de Bayamón con Maso Rivera
- Navidades con Maso Rivera y sus Conjuntos
- Maso Rivera Alegres Navidades Borincanas
- Maso Rivera: 60 Años de Música y Arte

== See also ==
- List of Puerto Ricans
