= Florencio Morales Ramos =

Puerto Rican singer of jíbaro music

- Also known as: Flor
- Born: September 5, 1915; Caguas, Puerto Rico
- Died: February 23, 1989 (aged 73); Salinas, Puerto Rico
- Genres: Jíbaro music
- Occupation(s): Musician, composer
- Instrument: Voice

Florencio ("Flor") Morales Ramos (September 5, 1915 – February 23, 1989), better known as Ramito, was a Puerto Rican trovador, and composer who was a native of Caguas, Puerto Rico. Fans of the genre consider him the king of Jíbaro music. Known as "El Cantor de la Montaña" (The Singer from the Mountain), Morales Ramos had two brothers, Luis ("Luisito") and Juan María ("Moralito"), who also attained major recognition as jíbaro singers.

== Early years ==
Ramito was born on September 5, 1915, in the Bairoa barrio of Caguas, Puerto Rico (very close to where Bairoa Gym, headquarters for many Puerto Rican prizefighters and boxing champions, stands nowadays); "Cagüitas" (Little Caguas) was a boyhood nickname of his, used by his closest friends. He left school in fourth grade ("but an old-time fourth grade at that!", he mentioned whenever asked) to assist his parents, who were parenting twelve other children (including six of their own), and whose economic situation was precarious. His mother had been an amateur singer and improviser and he would sing her favorite songs at the sugar cane fields where he served, first as a water boy and later as a messenger and sugar cane cutter. Regarded as a good singer by his peers, he was already singing for money at the age of thirteen. In 1932, he began his music career, as a participant at a local trova singers contest in Caguas. That was the beginning of fame for "Ramito".

== Musical career ==
Ten years later, in 1942, he inaugurated the WIAC radio station, a station with national reach. He also sang in the inaugural broadcast of WKJB-AM in Mayagüez, in 1948. Later he animated the radio show "La Hora del Volante", from Bayamón. His affable stage presence and reputation as a fast improviser and bright lyricist earned him a large following in Puerto Rico and growing communities of Puerto Rican migrants to the northeastern United States.

"Ramito" was featured in the short musical film "Truya" (1950), along the most reputed Puerto Rican jíbaro singers and musicians of the time, including Jesús Sánchez Erazo "Chuíto El De Bayamón", Ernestina Reyes, "La Calandria", Maso Rivera and others. He also appeared on television multiple times and he released a wide number of trova albums, of which many were best sellers in Puerto Rico and other Latin American countries.

Between 1960 and 1972 he nominally moved to New York, where he worked on the radio show "La Montaña Canta" on the WHOM station. He maintained a constant presence in Puerto Rico, however, virtually living between both places.

"Ramito" became an icon to fans of trova music in Puerto Rico, specially those in the mountainside areas of that island. He toured intensely in Latin America and the United States, and had a particularly strong following among the Puerto Rican community in Hawaii, which he visited twice. He also visited Okinawa, where he entertained Puerto Rican troops of the United States military who were stationed there. He sang for president John F. Kennedy at the White House in November 1961, in a showcase of Puerto Rican musical talent that complemented a visit by then governor Luis Muñoz Marín to Washington.

== Musical work ==
Ramito influenced several Puerto Rican musicians and singers, not only within the canción jíbara realm, but also in other Puerto Rican music genres, such as plena and salsa. He is credited with inventing the seis de enramada, one of the many musical structures to which Puerto Rican country music is sung to (collectively named seises after a distantly related genre made popular in Andalusian music). He also popularized the seis llanera, a variety of seis that incorporated musical influences that are also common to Venezuela.

Willie Colón was so strongly moved by Ramito's work that he recorded Patria y Amor, one of Ramito's décimas, as part of his seminal Christmas album Asalto Navideño (1971). Héctor Lavoe's interpretation of the song, renamed "Canto a Borinquen" for the album, is considered the definitive version of this patriotic song, which has since been versioned by José Feliciano, Lucecita Benítez and other Puerto Rican singers.

=== Que Bonita Bandera ===
External audio
- You may listen to "¡Que Bonita Bandera!" (What a beautiful flag!) performed by "Ramito" on YouTube

Ramito's composition "Qué Bonita Bandera" -a plena homage to the Puerto Rican flag- deserves a particular mention. During the decade previous to the song's inception in 1968, waving a Puerto Rican flag in public was considered taboo in the island (during a brief period in the early 1950s, which coincided with the Jayuya Uprising and the United States Capitol shooting incident of 1954 it was actually outlawed). Ramito wrote the song to demonstrate pride for the flag. In its lyrics, he incorporated the names of José de Diego, Ramón Emeterio Betances and Luis Muñoz Rivera, and manifested his wish to see it "floating freely over my beautiful Borinquen". It quickly became an unofficial anthem for Puerto Ricans everywhere, and was particularly popular among Puerto Ricans in New York City. Besides Ramito's original version, it has been versioned by multiple artists, including Jennifer Lopez, Ricky Martin, Pete Seeger, Yolandita Monge, Tony Croatto, José González y su Banda Criolla, and others. Salvadorean band La Fuerza used the song's chorus as the basis for a similarly named song honoring El Salvador.

On March 19, 2009, "Qué Bonita Bandera" was played as part of the wake-up call for Space Shuttle Mission STS-119, in honor of Mission Specialist Joe Acaba, whose ancestry is Puerto Rican.

== Personal life ==
In his early years, Ramito was an agricultural worker; he later served as a prison warden and firefighter before becoming a professional singer. In 1970 the government of Puerto Rico named him a liaison and goodwill ambassador to the Puerto Rican communities in the United States.

Ramito married six times and had eight children. His widow Irma Rodriguez is a jíbaro singer on her own merit, whose nickname is "La Jibarita de Salinas". Ramito relocated to her hometown, Salinas, after marrying her. On February 23, 1989, Ramito committed suicide by a self-inflicted gunshot wound in his in-law's house, after learning that a cancer he was suffering at the time had metastasized. He was buried in the town's cemetery.

== See also ==
- List of Puerto Ricans
