= Iluminado Davila Medina =

Puerto Rican cuatro musician (1918–2021)

Iluminado Dávila Medina
- Born: July 1, 1918; Morovis, Puerto Rico
- Died: June 7, 2021 (aged 102)
- Occupation: Cuatrista
- Instrument: Cuatro
- Formerly of: Grupo Idilio, Conjunto Típico Moroveño

Iluminado Dávila Medina (July 1, 1918 – June 7, 2021) was a Puerto Rican musician. He was a cuatrista.

== Biography ==
Dávila Medina was born in Morovis, Puerto Rico, the son of José Dávila Ortega, also a cuatro musician, and Joaquina Medina Guzmán. He had two sisters, older sister Elisa and younger sister Josefa, and a brother, Juan, who was older than him by one year. At the age of 17, he began listening to a radio show on WKAQ radio. About 1945, Dávila Medina was living in Vega Alta, a northern city in Puerto Rico near the country's capital of San Juan, when he decided to travel to San Juan and meet the musicians on that show, namely Leocadio Vizcarrondo, Samuel Archilla, Felipe Goyco and three other musicians who formed a popular, Puerto Rican radio music band of the time.

Dávila Medina and his friends once had a band named Grupo Idilio, which performed serenatas around Morovis. At age 18, he was also a member of Grupo Orión. Around 1956, he joined a radio show named "Onda Moroveña" (sic) in Arecibo, where he and his band played for three years. Dávila Medina played lead and secondary cuatro at that time.

Dávila Medina married a woman named Gladys; the marriage lasted 70 years until her death and produced two sons and one daughter; both sons preceded him in death. One of them, "Junior", once joined Iluminado on a band that Iluminado created in 1983, Conjunto Típico Moroveño.

Dávila Medina continued playing the cuatro well into his old age; during his 90s, he was still playing the cuatro on other artists' albums as well as on compilation albums.

He died on June 7, 2021, at the age of 102.

== Honors ==
On May 12, 2011, Puerto Rican governor Luis Fortuño Burset inaugurated the Centro de Bellas Artes Iluminado Dávila Medina in Morovis, a theater and musical venue that, since 2019, has a mosaic depicting its namesake, reminiscent of the one dedicated to basketball player Mario Morales at the Mario Morales Coliseum in Guaynabo, another large Puerto Rican city.

The Puerto Rican Senate passed a resolution on April 18, 2018, congratulating Iluminado Dávila Medina for his musical career and in recognition of his soon-to-be 100th birthday.

Davila featured in the documentary series Crónicas 90, which highlighted the achievements of Puerto Ricans who had reached the age of 90. Other people featured in the series included: Frank H. Wadsworth, José R. Alicea, Victoria Espinosa, Nellie Vera Sánchez and Flavia Lugo de Marichal.

== See also ==
- List of Puerto Ricans
