= Guitarro (instrument) =

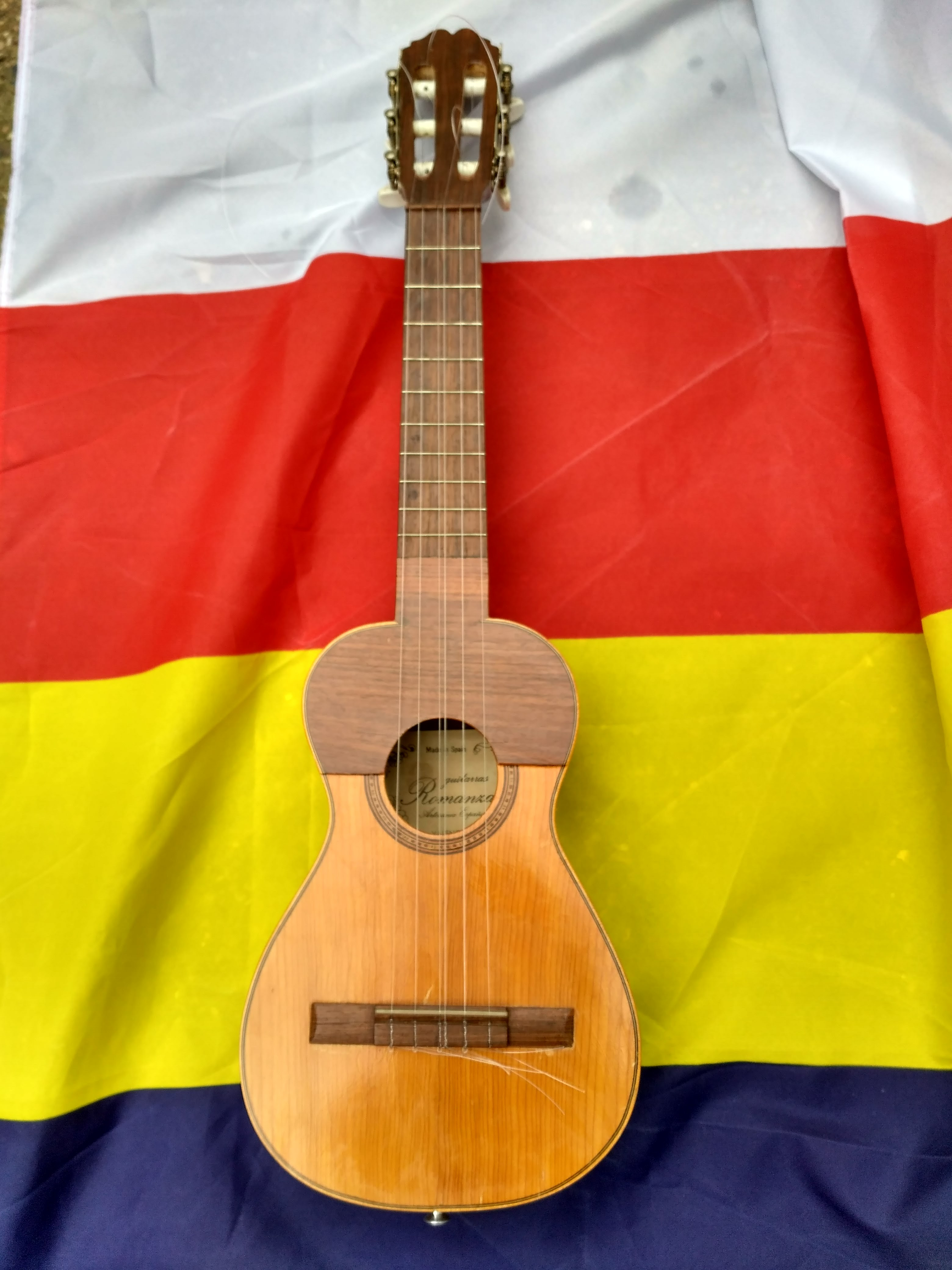
Spanish guitarro

The Guitarro (Catalan: guitarró) is a small, baroque, five-stringed guitar from Aragon, slightly larger than the requinto or cavaquinho. The instrument is also found in other regions of Spain, such as Andalusia, La Mancha, and Murcia.

Common tuning is B F# D A E, but this sometimes varies. While all five strings are usually single, the three middle strings can also be doubly strung to produce a stronger sound.

Never intended as a solo instrument, the guitarro typically provides plucked accompaniment to Aragonese jotas and rondas.

This instrument was brought to America and there are instruments derived from it throughout America.
