= Puerto Rican cuatro =

Musical instrument

Puerto Rican Cuatro
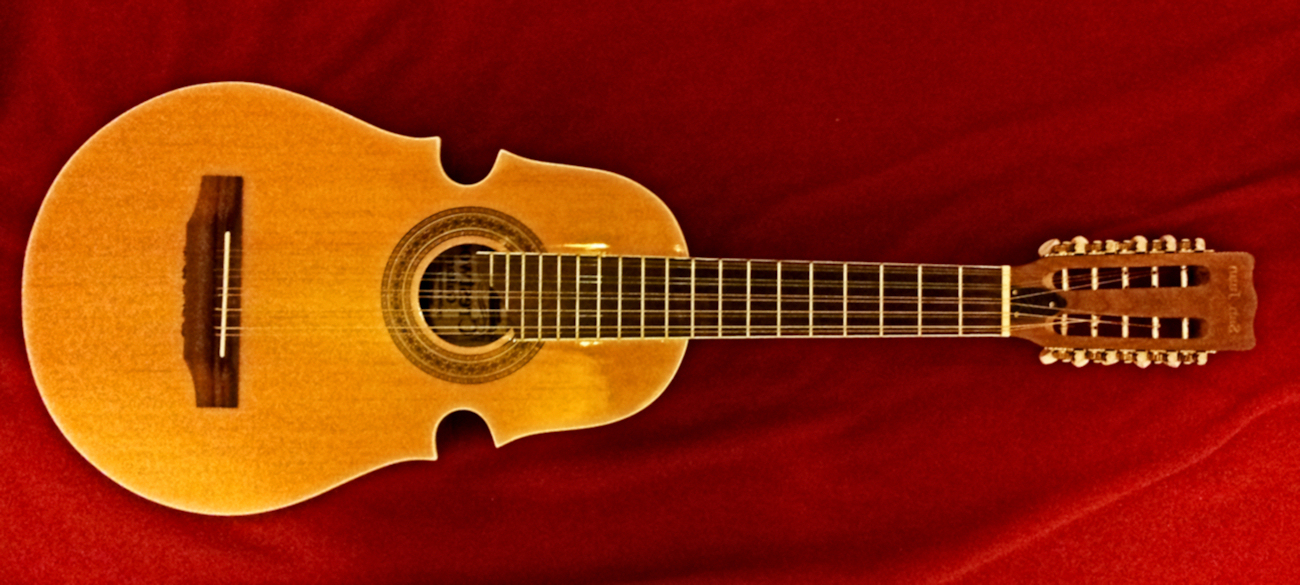
- A Puerto Rican cuatro strung for left-handed playing (with lower and thicker strings at the bottom of the picture), 2014

String instrument
- Classification: String instrument
- Hornbostel–Sachs classification: (Composite chordophone)

More articles or information
- Tiple (Puerto Rico), Bordonúa

The Puerto Rican cuatro (Spanish: cuatro puertorriqueño) is the national instrument of Puerto Rico. It belongs to the lute family of string instruments, and is guitar-like in function, but with a shape closer to that of the violin. The word cuatro means "four", which was the total number of strings of the earliest Puerto Rican instrument known by the cuatro name.

The current cuatro has ten strings in five courses, tuned, in fourths, from low to high B3 B2♦E4 E3♦A3 A3♦D4 D4♦G4 G4 (note that the bottom two pairs are in octaves, while the top three pairs are tuned in unison), and a scale length of 500–520 millimetres.

The cuatro is the most familiar of the three instruments which make up the Puerto Rican jíbaro orchestra (the cuatro, the tiple and the bordonúa).

A cuatro player is called a cuatrista. This instrument has had its prominent performers like Ladislao Martínez Otero (a.k.a. "El Maestro Ladí"), Nieves Quintero, Maso Rivera, Iluminado Dávila Medina, Yomo Toro, Edwin Colón Zayas, and Christian Nieves.

== History ==
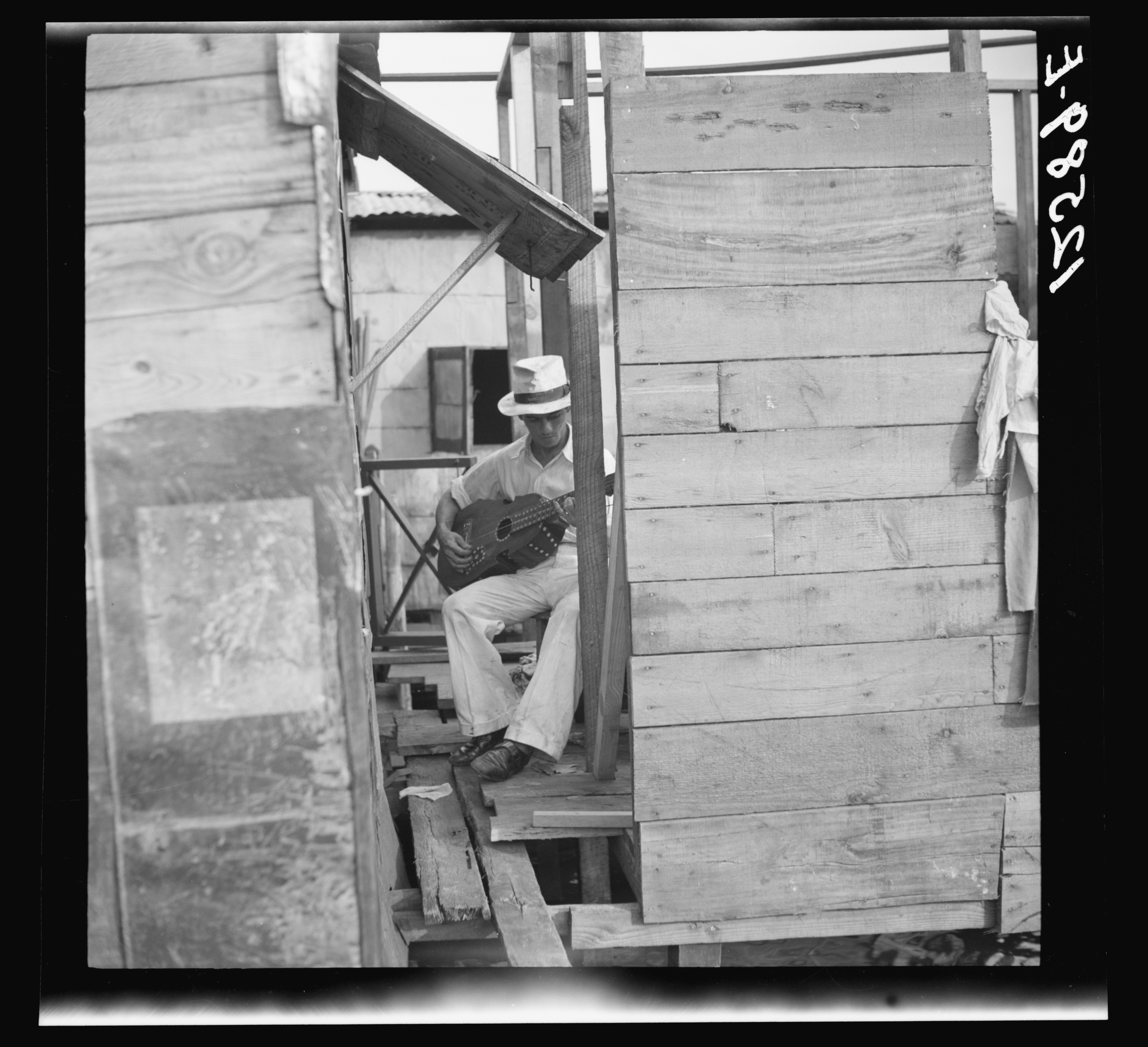
Cuatro player in the workers' quarter of Puerta de Tierra, San Juan

Very little is known about the exact origin of the cuatro. However, most experts believe that the cuatro has existed on the island in one form or another for about 400 years. The Spanish instrument that it is most closely related to is the vihuela poblana (also known as the Medieval/Renaissance guitar), which had four courses, two strings each for eight strings in total as well as the Spanish Medieval/Renaissance four-course and the Spanish laúd, particularly in the Canary Islands.

There was a "cuatro antiguo" which had four single strings, then eight strings in four doubled courses, and then the modern cuatro with five double courses. Despite the name, however, the origins are not clear.

== Types of Puerto Rican cuatros ==
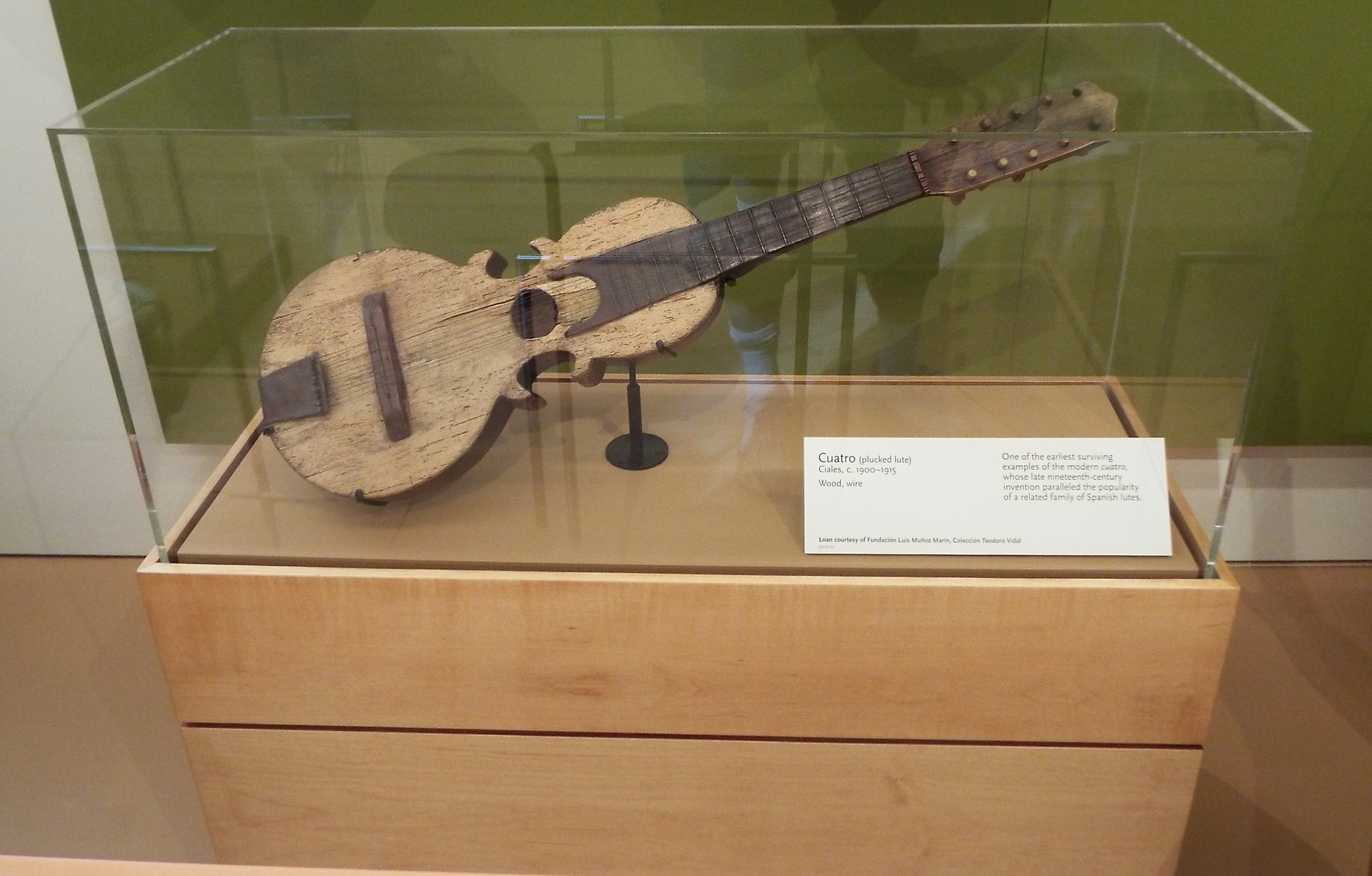
An antique Cuatro (c. 1900 – 1915) on exhibit in the Musical Instrument Museum of Phoenix

There are three main types of cuatro: cuatro antiguo of four orders and four strings, the "Southern" cuatro of four orders and eight strings, and the cuatro "moderno" of five orders and ten strings.

- The four-string cuatro antiguo: This is the original Puerto Rican cuatro. It was made from a single block of wood and used four gut strings. This instrument may have evolved from the vihuela poblana. It was used to mostly play jíbaro music.
- The eight-string "Southern" cuatro: This cuatro evolved from the old four-string cuatro. It was made like a guitar and had four pairs of steel strings. It was used to play salon genres like the mazurka, danza, waltz, polka, etc.
- The ten-string cuatro "moderno": This cuatro evolved from the Baroque era ten-string bandurria and laúd from Spain. It is made from a single block of wood and it has five pairs of steel strings. It is the most commonly used today and is used to play jíbaro music, salon genres, salsa, pop, rock, classical, jazz, and even American bluegrass and many more styles.

== Cuatro shapes, sizes and variants ==
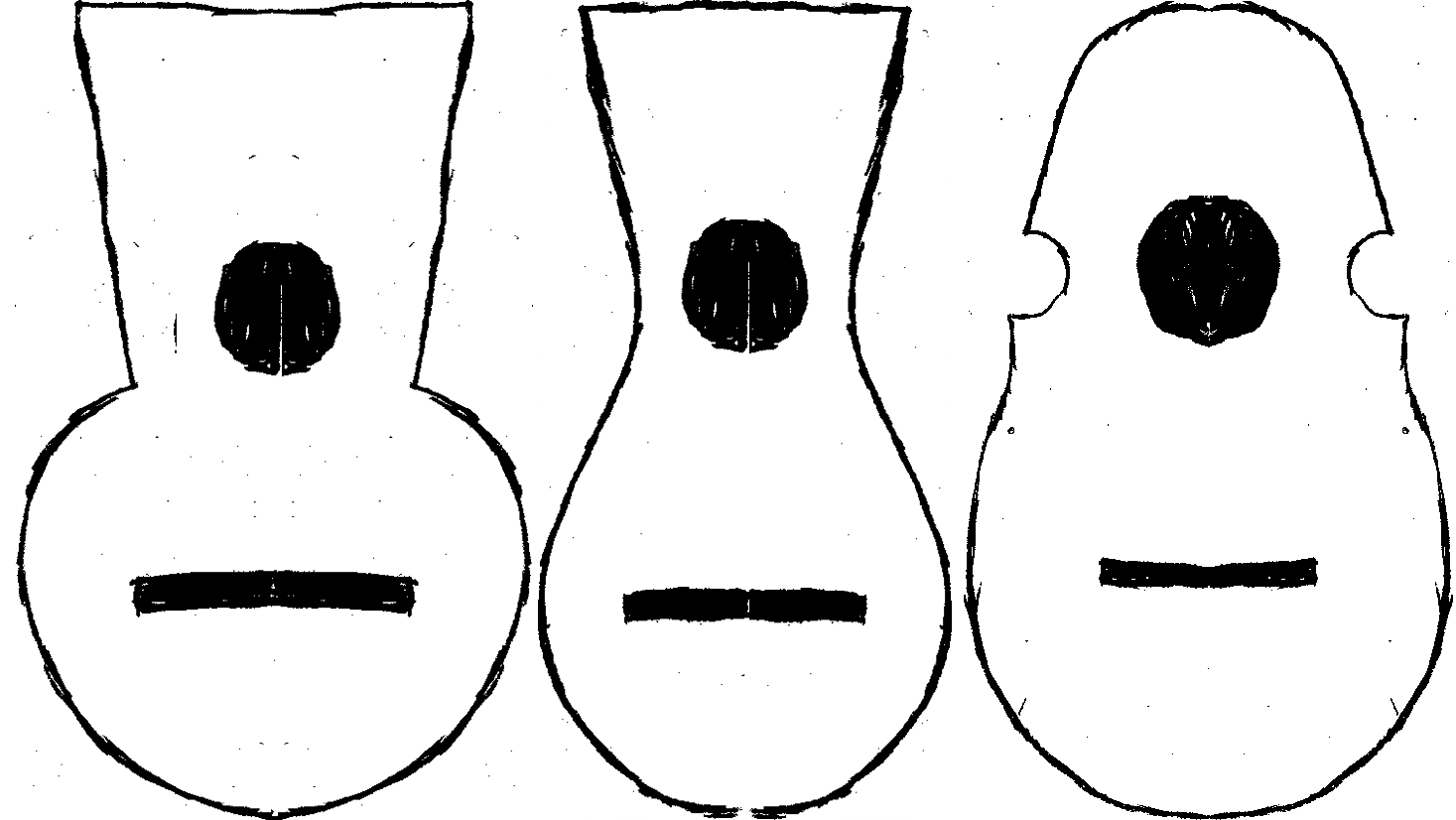
A plan of three cuatro body designs. From left to right, the traditional cuatro antiguo design, the "Southern" soft waisted cuatro antiguo, and the modern "aviolinado" cuatro.

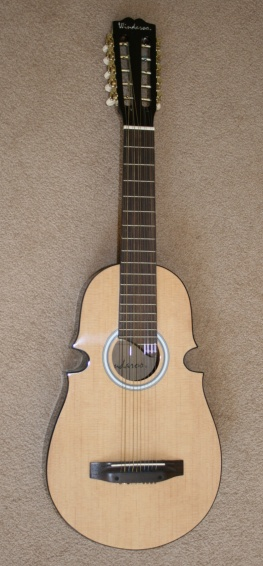
A modern Puerto Rican cuatro

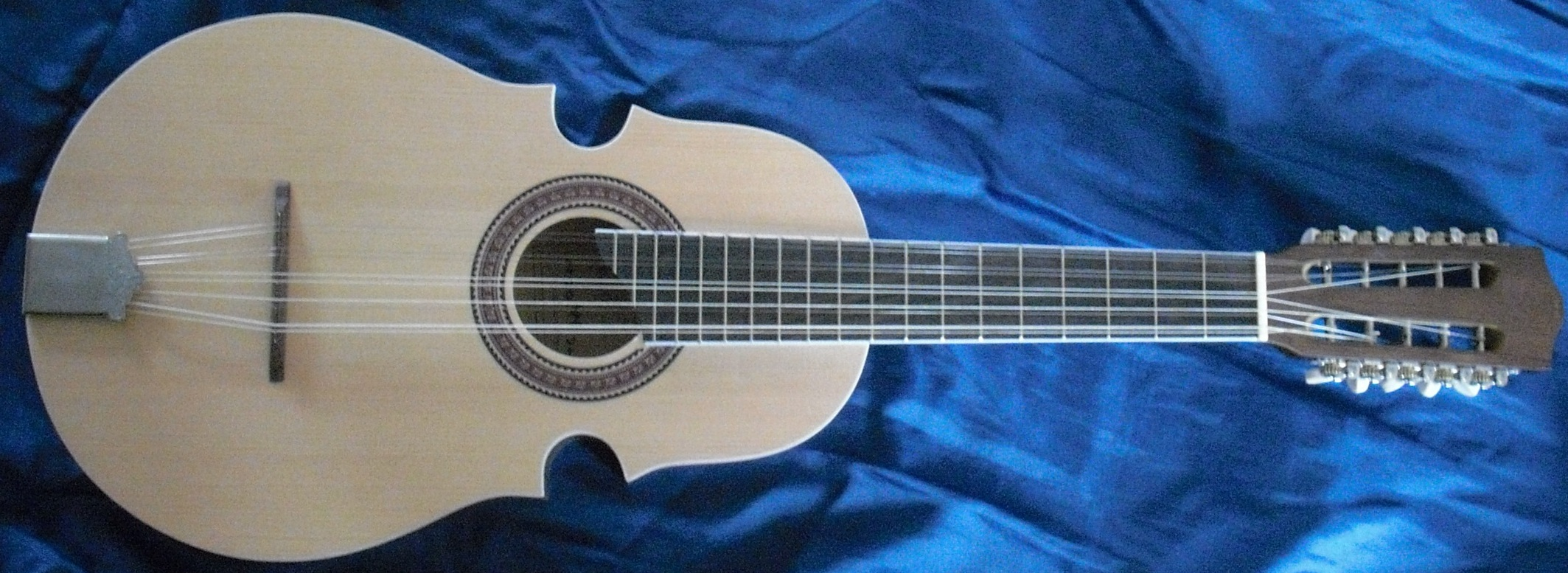
A Puerto Rican cuatro with a floating bridge

Sound Box designs

- The antiguo design: This box resembles a medieval keyhole, also known as cuatro cuadrao, or cuatro araña. This shape has been found on some old dotars and citolas. Four-string, eight-string and ten-string cuatros were made using this design. This was the very first design and it might be 400 years old. Sometimes some ten-string cuatros are still made with this design.
- The aviolinado design: This box resembles a violin. It is the most common shape used today. Eight-string and ten-string cuatros were made using this design starting in the 19th century.
- The dos puntos design: This box looked like some old mandolinas made by Martin in the United States during the 20th century. However, it was first used in the 19th century in Yauco, Puerto Rico. Eight-string cuatros were made using this design.
- The tulipán design: This box looked like the antiguo design but with no straight lines and all curves and thus resembled a tulip. Eight-string and ten-string cuatros were made using this design during the 1900s near Yauco and Ponce.
- The higuera design: This is the rarest design. This box was shaped like an organic oval. This was because the soundboxes were made from domed gourds instead of wood. Four-string cuatros were made using this design in the 19th century in Puerto Rico by enslaved Africans on the island. Now they are made with ten metal strings and often have designs carved onto their backs.
- Besides these, many other lesser-known and one-of-a-kind designs also exist.

Variants

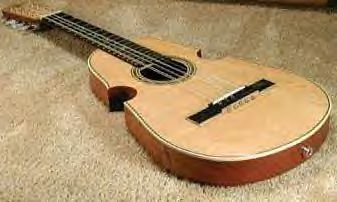
A "Thinline" Cumpiano Puerto Rican Cuatro

In the 1950s, there was an effort to produce a "classical" ensemble of cuatros, with various-sized instruments taking on the role of the violins, violas, cellos, and double basses in a classical orchestra. To meet these roles cuatros of the aviolinado style were produced in four different sizes and tunings: Cuatro Soprano, Cuatro Alto, Cuatro Tradicional (the standard instrument, also called Cuatro Tenor), and Cuatro Bajo (Bass Cuatro): all have ten strings and are tuned in fourths. The project met with only limited success and today most of these variants are rare, with the cuatro tradicional surviving as the standard instrument.

There is also a Cuatro Lírico ("lyrical cuatro"), which is about the size of the Tenor, but has a deep jelly-bean shaped body; a Cuatro Sonero, which has fifteen strings in five courses of three strings each; and a Seis, which is a Cuatro Tradicional with an added two string course (usually a lower course tuned to F-Sharp in Octaves), giving it a total of twelve strings in six courses and extending its range down by a perfect fourth. The Seis can also be played like a Guitar by tuning the top 2 courses down a half step to C-Sharp & High F-Sharp. The resulting tuning is like a Guitar with a capo on the 2nd Fret (F-Sharp Standard)

== Cuatro orchestras of Puerto Rico ==
The original cuatro orchestra was the orquesta jíbara which consisted of a various number of different string instruments:

- Puerto Rican Tiple
- Cuatro Tradicional
- Bordonúa

At least two configurations of "classical" cuatro orchestra were formed in the 1950s and 1960s:

- Primero Cuatro Concertino
- Segundo Cuatro Concertino
- Cuatro Bajo
- Cuatro Rítmico
- Cuatro Tradicional

Or:

- Cuatro Soprano
- Cuatro Tenor
- Cuatro Alto
- Cuatro Bajo

As noted, most of the instrumental variants are now rare, as are these classical groupings. There have been, however, modern efforts to revive the orquesta jíbara.

== "The Puerto Rican Cuatro Project" ==
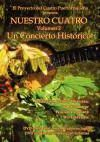
OUR CUATRO Vol. 2

William Cumpiano and Juan Sotomayor Perez founded the Puerto Rican Cuatro Project, a non-profit organization dedicated to fostering the traditions that surround the national instrument of Puerto Rico, by means of gathering, promoting and preserving the cultural memories of Puerto Rican musical traditions, folkloric stringed instruments and musicians. The Cuatro Project is also dedicated to promoting and preserving the Puerto Rican décima verse form and the traditional song as created by its greatest troubadours, living and past.

Cumpiano, together with Sotomayor and Wilfredo Echevarría, wrote, directed and produced two DVD documentaries for The Cuatro Project. They are: OUR CUATRO Vol. 1, the first feature-length documentary about the cuatro and its music and OUR CUATRO Vol. 2: A Historic Concert. Cumpiano and cultural researcher David Morales produced another DVD documentary THE DÉCIMA BORINQUEÑA: An ancient poetic singing tradition, directed by Myriam Fuentes. The proceeds of these recordings were to be used for the research and documentation activities of the Puerto Rican Cuatro Project.

- "Nuestro Cuatro: Volumen 1", The Puerto Ricans and their stringed instruments. An unprecedented documentary that reveals the emotional story of the development and the history of the music and stringed instruments traditions of Puerto Rico.
- "Nuestro Cuatro: Volumen 2", Un Concierto Histórico/A Historical Concert. The conclusion of the video documentary Nuestro Cuatro, a cultural and musical history of the Puerto Rican cuatro and Puerto Rico's stringed instruments.

== Use in popular music ==
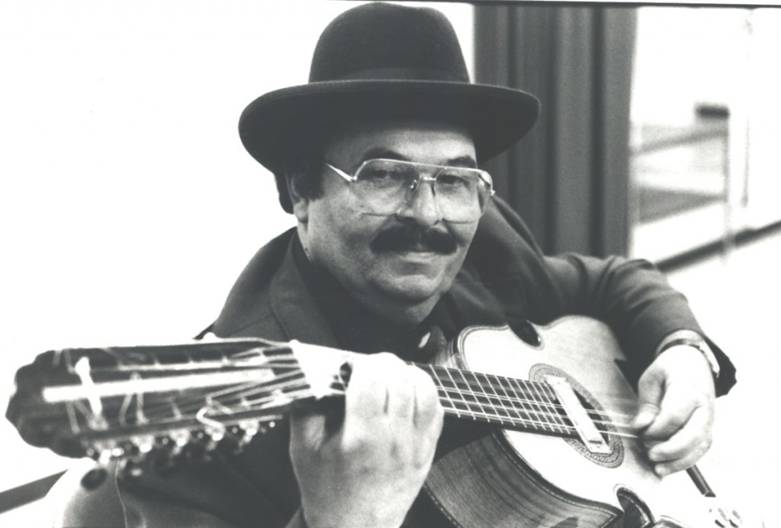
Famous cuatrista Yomo Toro

Jon Anderson used a cuatro on the Yes album Tormato, although the sleeve-notes misdescribe the instrument as an Álvarez ten-string guitar. Puerto Rican singer-songwriter Christian Nieves played a cuatro on the 2017 hit single "Despacito" by Luis Fonsi featuring Daddy Yankee; the instrument, as strung for left-handed playing, appears at 3:32 of the song's official music video, which became the most-viewed video on YouTube on August 4, 2017. During the Super Bowl LX halftime show, bandmember José Eduardo Santana played the cuatro during Ricky Martin's cover of "Lo Que Le Pasó a Hawaii."

== See also ==
- El Cuatro (Spanish Wikipedia)
- Music of Puerto Rico
- Cuatro (Venezuela)
