= Pacho Benavides =

Colombian tiplista and composer (1900–1971)

- Born: Francisco Benavides Caro; 1900 (13 June or 20 October); Vélez, Colombia
- Died: 18 December 1971 (aged 71) Bogotá, Colombia

Francisco Benavides Caro (Note: In this name that follows Hispanic American naming customs, the first or paternal surname is Benavides and the second or maternal family name is Caro.) (1900–1971), known as Pacho Benavides, was a Colombian tiplista and composer. He performed in several American and European countries, and is known for playing the tiple as a lead solo instrument, and for a tiple concert that he gave at the Teatro Colón in Bogotá.

== Early life and music career ==
Pacho Benavides was born in 1900 in Vélez, in the Colombian department of Santander, to Bethsabé Caro and Próspero Benavides. Although 20 October 1900 is Benavides' widely reported date of birth, musicologist José Pinilla Aguilar received a letter from the Diocese of Socorro y San Gil stating that he was born on 13 June 1900, and baptised on 20 October. As a child, Benavides learned to play tiple and bandola. He attended school at the Colegio del Centenario in Vélez, and later attended the Colegio Universitario de Vélez.

In 1933 Benavides met José A. Morales, and they went on to record together in the 1950s, and accompanied singer Luis Macía González on a trip to Caracas. Also in the 1950s, Benavides recorded the album Canta el tiple for record label Sonolux, accompanied by Edilberto Quiroga on guitar and Aristarco Gómez on second tiple. Benavides performed in several countries in the Americas, and in 1955 on the advice of Mario Moreno he travelled to Spain, where he lived for 3–5 years. While in Europe, Benavides performed in countries including Italy, Germany, and England. Benavides was briefly a member of the trio Alma Nacional alongside Leoncio Herrera and Felipe Durán.

In 1962, Benavides' hometown Vélez gave him the Order of the Guabina and the Tiple, an award created in his honour. In the late 1960s (Note: The year has variously been reported as 1967, 1969, and 1970.) Benavides gave a tiple concert at the Teatro Colón in Bogotá which brought him "national recognition". Pinilla Aguilar described the concert as a "historical occasion for Colombian popular music.

The award for the best tiplista at the Mono Núñez Andean Music Festival is named after Benavides.

== Personal life and death ==
Benavides was married to Aurora Sarmiento in November 1924 in Suaita. They had two sons. He died on 18 December 1971 in Bogotá.

== Musical style and compositions ==
Benavides is particularly known as a tiple player, which he played as a solo instrument, rather than as an accompaniment as was traditional. He composed in various genres including guabina, torbellino, bambuco, and pasillo. His notable compositions include "Tatica", "Veleñita", and "Lejana juventud".
