= USS Guitarro =

USS Guitarro has been the name of more than one United States Navy ship, and may refer to:

- USS Guitarro (SS-363), a submarine in commission from 1944 to 1945, from 1952 to 1953, and in 1954
- USS Guitarro (SSN-665), a submarine in commission from 1972 to 1992
