= Tiple (Puerto Rico) =

Smallest of the three string instruments of Puerto Rico

The tiple is the smallest of the three string instruments of Puerto Rico that make up the orquesta jibara (i.e., the cuatro, the tiple and the bordonúa). According to investigations made by Jose Reyes Zamora, the tiple in Puerto Rico dates back to the 18th century. It is believed to have evolved from the Spanish guitarrillo. There was never a standard for the tiple and as a result there are many variations throughout the island of Puerto Rico. Most tiples have four or five strings and most tiple requintos have three strings. Some tiples have as many as 6 strings and as few as a single string, though these types are rare.

The main types of tiple in Puerto Rico are:

- Tiple doliente - this tiple has 5 single strings and is the most common used today. It is usually approximately 380mm total in length with a scale length of 350-365mm. It is tuned E3, A3, D4, G4, C5.
- Tiplón or tiple con macho - a larger version of the tiple with a fifth string peg like an American banjo, located on its neck. It usually has a scale length of approximately 530mm. It is tuned G5, D5, G4, B4, E5 or A5, D5, A4, B4, B5.
- Tiple requinto de la montaña - a tiny version of the tiple doliente with only three strings. It usually has a scale length of approximately 300mm. It is tuned D4, G4, B4.
- Tiple requinto costanero - a smaller version of the tiplón with only three strings. It usually has a scale length of approximately 380mm. It is tuned D4, G4, B4.
- Tiple grande de Ponce - the largest version with 5 strings. It is considered to be the link between tiples and bordonuas. It is sometimes also called bordonúa chiquita (or small bordonua). It usually has a scale length of approximately 530mm. It is tuned D4, G4, C5, E5, A5.
- Tiple Vihuela - A tiple with 5 doubled courses of strings, like a small cuatro. It usually has a scale length of approximately 350mm.
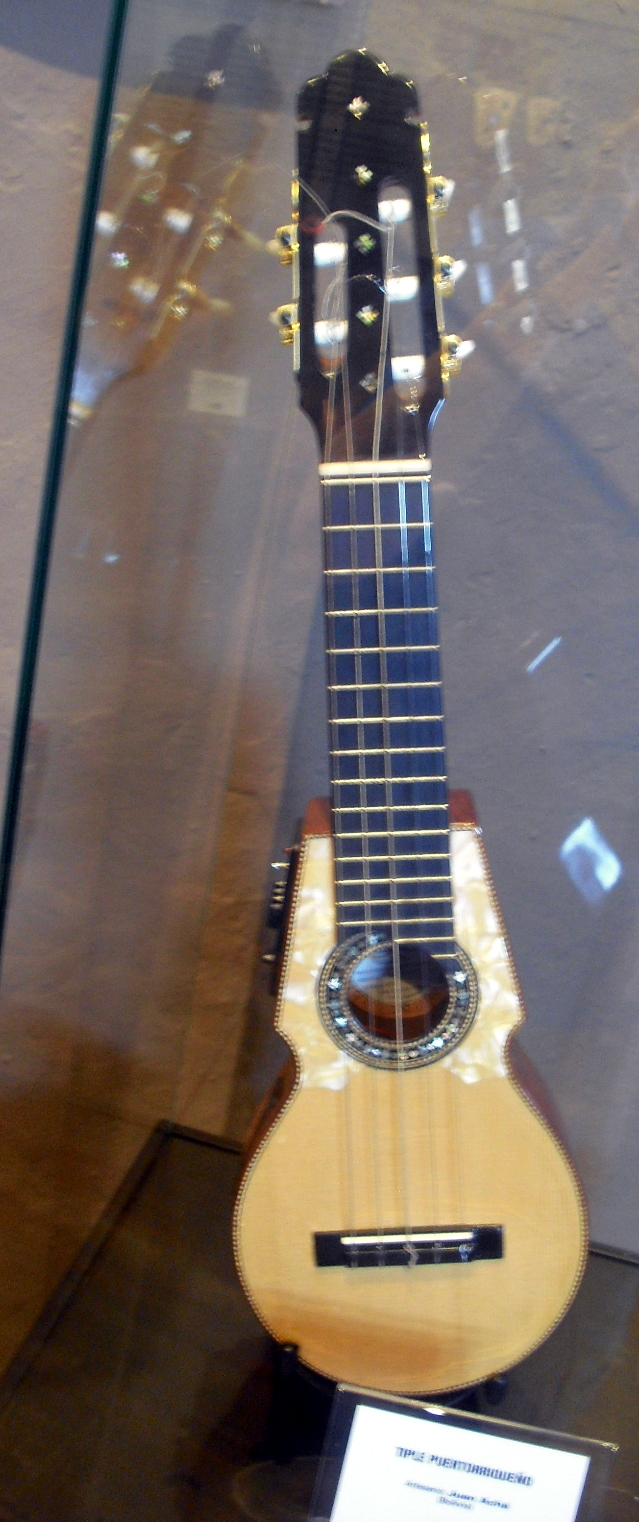
Puerto Rican Tiple Doliente at the Casa Museo Del Timple, Lanzarote, Spain

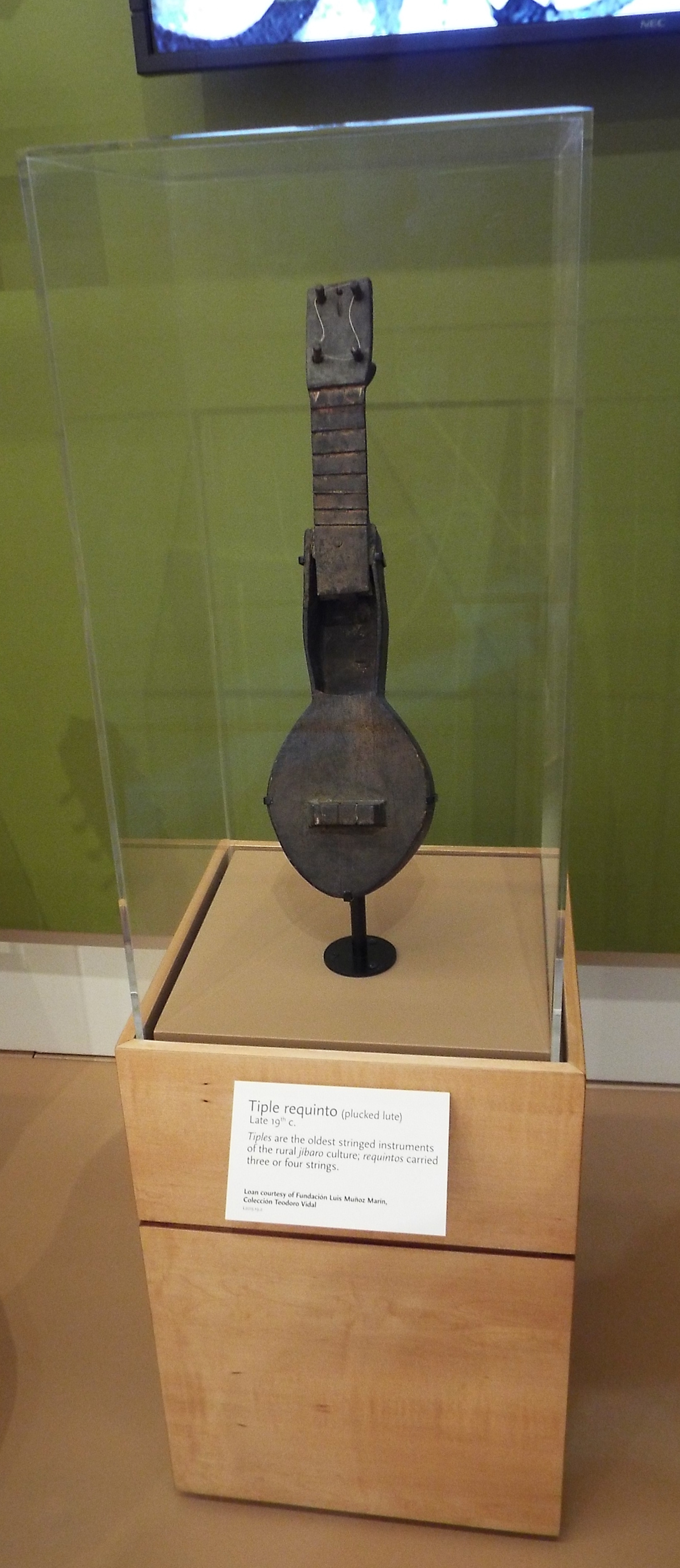
A late 19th century Tiple Requinto on exhibit in the Musical Instrument Museum of Phoenix

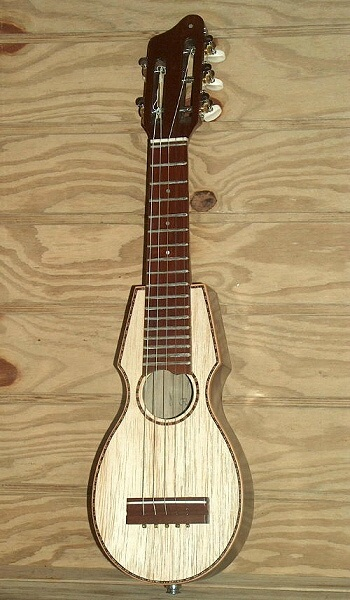
Puerto Rican Tiple Doliente

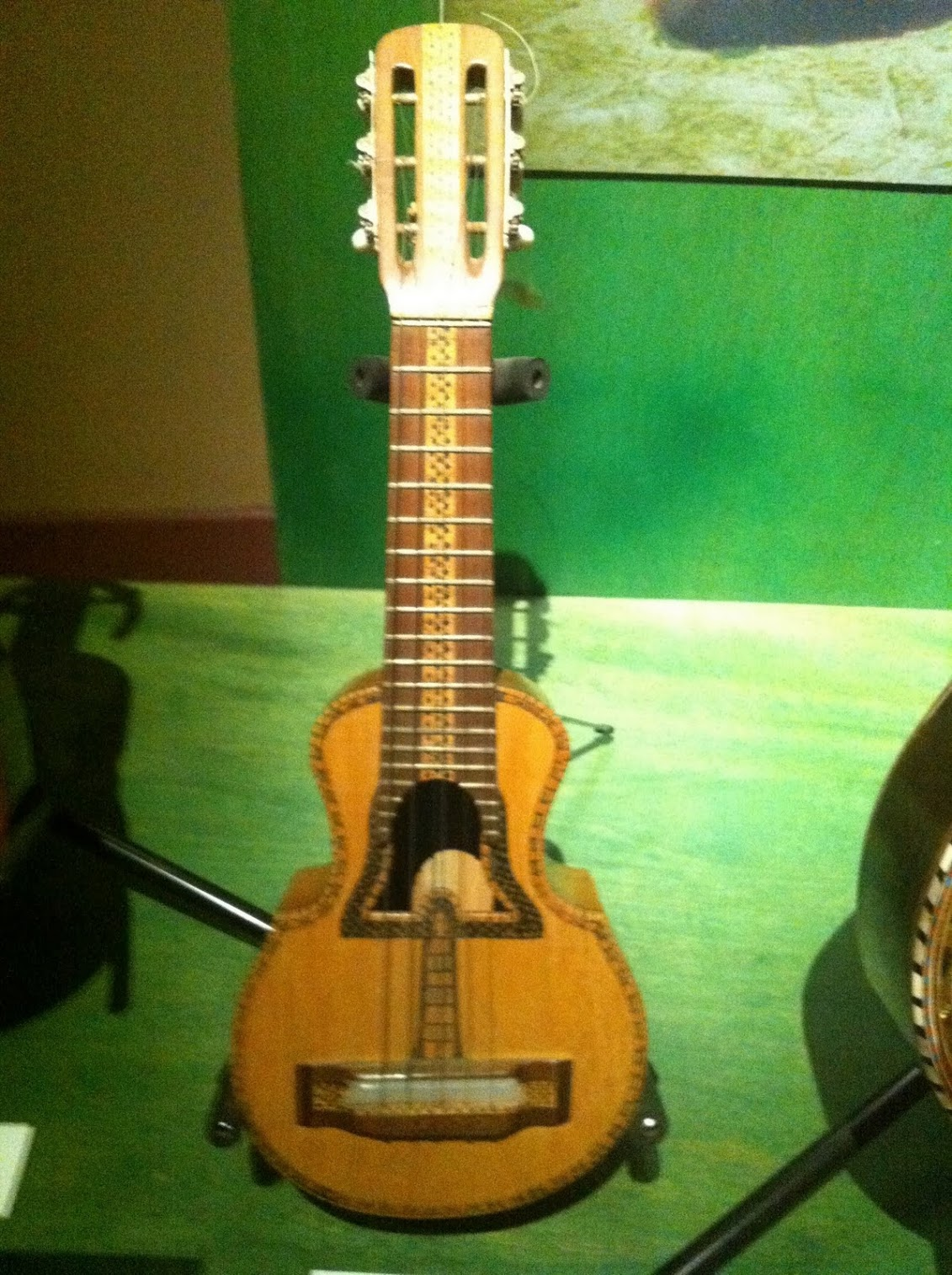
A different body style of Tiple

The tiple that is now most often played in Puerto Rico is the Tiple Doliente. It has recently acquired a more or less fixed body shape narrowing at the top and having 5 strings (see the accompanying photo). It is usually made like the cuatro, so either constructed like a guitar, or from one piece of wood hollowed out. The bottom half of the body is rounded like a guitar, however the top half is square, or triangular. All other features (like neck and bridge) resemble the construction of a normal Spanish guitar. The peghead has tuning machines either from the side or from the back.

The Tiple doliente is tuned with 5 metal strings: E3, A3, D4, G4, C5.
