= Bordonua =

Musical instrument of Puerto Rico

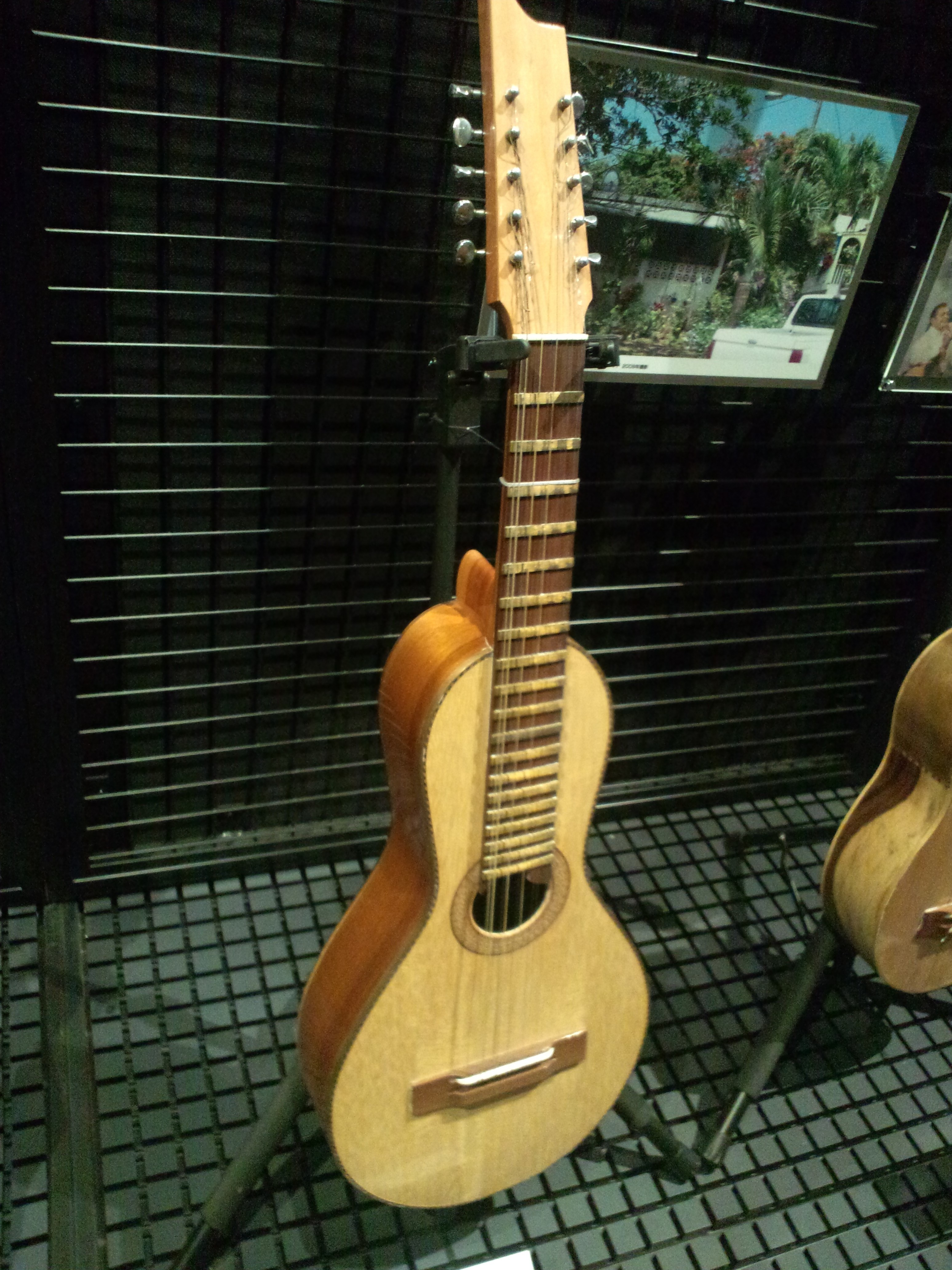
- A bordonua in a museum in Osaka, Japan.

String instrument
- Classification: String instrument
- Hornbostel–Sachs classification: (Composite chordophone)

More articles or information
- Tiple (Puerto Rico), Cuatro (Puerto Rico), Vihuela.

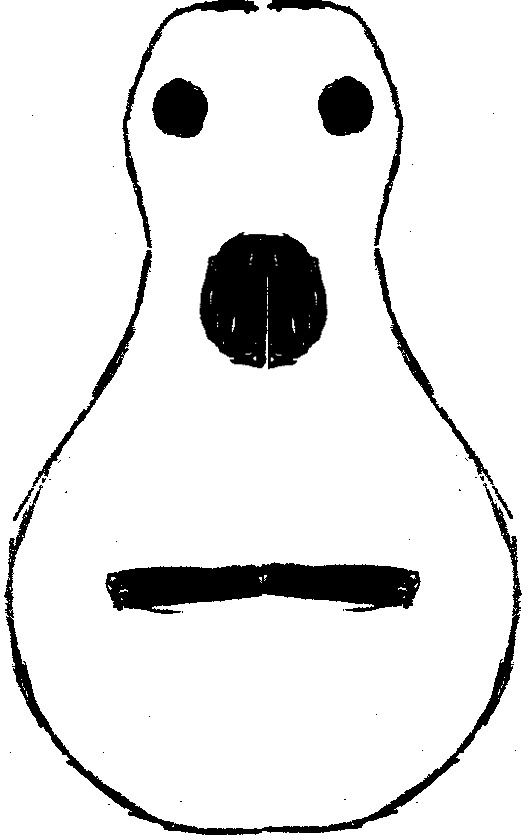
A plan of the body shape of a bordonua, with the typical triple sound holes.

The bordonua (bordonúa) is a large, deep-body (sound-boxes are usually 6 inches (15 cm) deep) bass guitar which is native to Puerto Rico. They are made using several different shapes and sizes.

The bordonúa is the least common of the three stringed instruments that make up the Puerto Rican orquesta jibara (i.e., the cuatro, the tiple and the bordonúa).

The bordonua usually has three sound holes, with a large central one and two smaller ones in the two corners of the upper bout. The usual body shape is quite slender and tapers in towards the top; however, there is a wide variety of other designs also.

== History ==
The original bordonua resembles the old 17th-century Spanish Acoustic bass guitar called the Bajo de la Una. There were also special melodic bordonuas that were used during the 1920s and 1930s as accompaniment to melody instead of the bass role. These were oddly tuned like a tiple. This configuration is no longer used on the island. They are also related to the Spanish Renaissance vihuela, brought to the Island by conquering Spanish.

== Currently ==
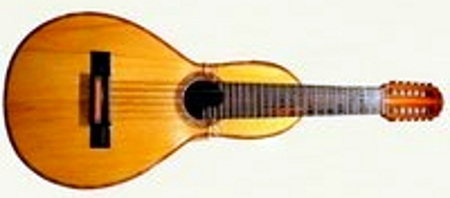
A bordonua.

All bordonuas made today are used as bass guitars, primarily by initiatives promoting folk music. There are several different types of bordonuas which are made in Puerto Rico today:

- 6-string bordonua – This bordonua has six single strings.
- 8-string bordonua – This bordonua has four pairs of strings.
- 10-string bordonua – This bordonua has five pairs of strings. (This is the most common type)

== Baby bordonua a.k.a. bordonúa chiquita ==
Apparently, a very small bordonúa also existed in some regions of the island. It is descended from the Spanish guitar family, in contrast to the Cuatro, that descends from the family of bandurria.

These smaller bordonúas are the same as the larger Tiple Guitarrillos. They were figure 8 shaped with a very narrow waist between the upper and lower bouts.

== Tunings for the bordonua ==
Bordonúa (6 string)

- D
- A
- E
- E
- B
- F#

Bordonúa (10 string)

- A-a
- D-d
- F#-f#
- b-b
- e-e
