= Cuatro (instrument) =

Any of several Latin American instruments of the guitar or lute families

Venezuelan Cuatros

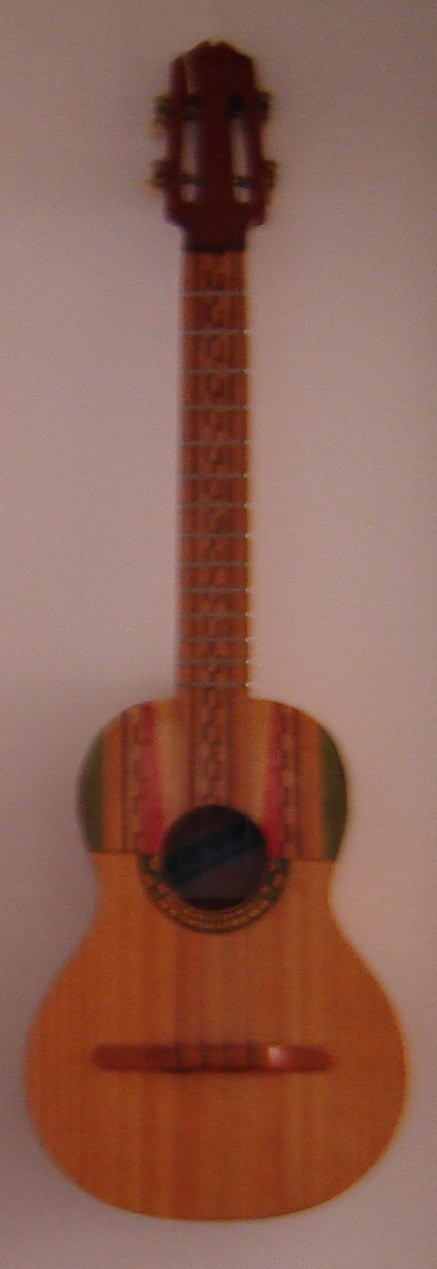
Venezuelan Folk Cuatro

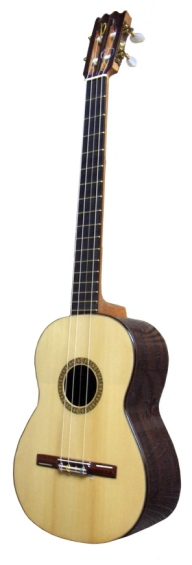
Venezuelan Concert Cuatro

The cuatro is a family of Latin American string instruments played in Colombia, Puerto Rico, Venezuela and other Latin American countries. It is derived from the Spanish guitar. Although some have viola-like shapes, most cuatros resemble a small to mid-sized classical guitar. In Puerto Rico and Venezuela, the cuatro is an ensemble instrument for secular and religious music, and is played at parties and traditional gatherings.

Cuatro means four in Spanish; the instrument's 15th century predecessors were the Spanish vihuela and the Portuguese cavaquinho, the latter having four strings like the cuatro.

Modern cuatros come in a variety of sizes and shapes, and number of strings. Cuatros can either have single-strings, like a guitar, or double- or triple-coursed strings like a mandolin, and vary in size from a large mandolin or small guitar, to the size of a full-size guitar. Depending on their particular stringing, cuatros are part of the guitar or mandolin subfamilies of the lute family.

== Cuban Cuatro ==
The Cuban cuatro (cuatro Cubano, or tres cuatro) is similar to a Cuban tres, but with 4 courses of doubled strings, instead of the usual 3 courses. It is usually tuned G_{4} G_{3} — C_{4} C_{4} — E_{4} E_{4} — A_{4} A_{4} .

== Puerto Rican cuatros ==
The early Puerto Rican cuatro had four strings of gut, which gave the instrument its name. In the second half of the 19th century a different instrument also called cuatro appeared along the island's northern coast, with ten wire strings in five pairs tuned in fourths like the Spanish bandurria and laúd. It was first built in the same keyhole shape as the older cuatro and later took on a violin-like outline. This ten-string cuatro spread across the island in the 1930s, when the cuatrista Ladislao Martínez played it on early Puerto Rican radio. After many years of constant rise in popularity, the Puerto Rican government approved a law in 2002 declaring that every year on November 17, the Commonwealth would celebrate "El día del Cuatro y del Cuatrista Puertorriqueño" (Day of the Cuatro and Puerto Rican Cuatro Player). Only a year later, the Puerto Rican cuatro was one of three instruments that were declared the National Instruments of the Commonwealth of Puerto Rico and important symbols of Puerto Rican culture.

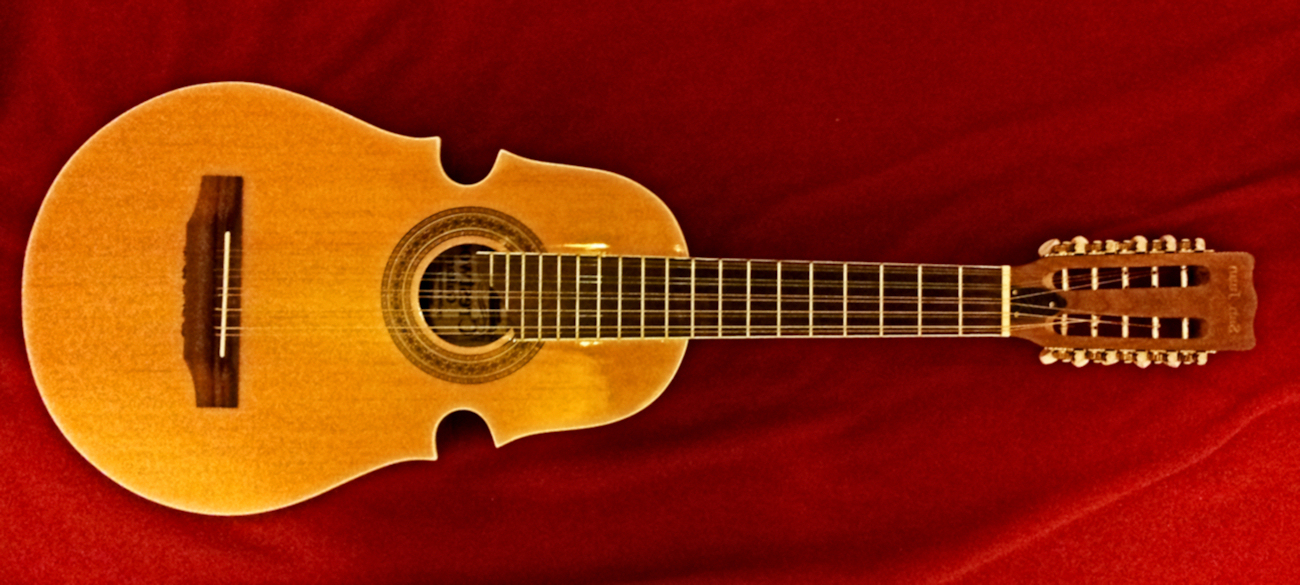
A Puerto Rican Cuatro

The Puerto Rican cuatro is shaped more like a viola than a guitar, and is the most familiar of the three instruments of the Puerto Rican orquesta jíbara (i.e., the cuatro, the tiple and the bordonua). The Puerto Rican cuatro has ten strings in five courses, tuned in fourths from low to high, with B and E in octaves and A, D, and G in unisons: B_{3} B_{2} — E_{4} E_{3} — A_{3} A_{3} — D_{4} D_{4} — G_{4} G_{4} .

The cuatro is composed of several parts that work together to formulate the distinguishable sound of the instrument:

- Clavijero (pegbox): This is found at the head of the cuatro, which allows the instrument's strings to be tuned
- Cejuela (nut or hueso): This is found on both ends of the cuatro, close to the head of the instrument, and in the overall body of it. It helps keep the strings in place as well as aid in the tuning process of the instrument.
- Trastes (fret): There are 18 to 20 frets in a traditional Puerto Rican Cuatro.
- Diapasón (diapason): Diapason is an addition of the cuatro that is placed under the frets, to allow the musician comfort to the hand and a grasp whilst he/she is playing.
- Rosetas (rosette): This is a circular ornament that is present at the mouth of the instrument. Although this allows cuatros to be distinguishable, the actual function that these serve in the instrument is for feedback prevention.
- Cuerdas (string): The strings are the main element that is in charge of producing sound. By being struck with a pick, they are able to produce various sounds and variations of chords in a cuatro.
- Puente (bridge): The function of the bridge is to be able to maintain the strings in the position they are supposed to be in. In the bridge there is a cejuela, which aids in this task as well.
- Caja armónica (harmonic box): This is the overall body of the cuatro. It helps modify the sound produced and helps spread it to the surrounding air or environment.

Several sizes of the instrument exist, including a cuatro soprano, cuatro alto, cuatro tradicional (the standard instrument, also called cuatro tenor), and cuatro bajo (bass): All have 10 strings and are tuned in fourths. There is also a cuatro lírico (lyrical cuatro), which is about the size of the tenor, but has a deep jellybean-shaped body; a cuatro sonero, which has 15 strings in 5 courses of 3 strings each; and a seis, which is a cuatro tradicional with an added two-string course (usually a lower course), giving it a total of 12 strings in 6 courses.

The Puerto Rican Cuatro is played with a pick, and the cuatrista will strike downwards on the string with the pick in order to generate the sound that the person wants to produce. The most popular technique used to play the cuatro is called tremolo, which occurs when a cuatro player continually strikes the same chord multiple times to generate a sound for a longer period of time. The tremolo is used to play longer lasting notes, like whole notes, half notes, and tied eighth notes and sixteenth notes.

Musically, the Puerto Rican cuatro, although it is used throughout the year, it is mostly heard during Christmas time. The genres of music where the cuatro's presence is really known in Plena, the Trova, the Aguinaldo and the Seis that were created in Puerto Rico. Sometimes, it is integrated in salsa and other genres of music like the waltz. Some of the aguinaldos and seises created in Puerto Rico are:

- Alegre Vengo
- De la Montaña Venimos
- Saludos, Saludos
- De Tierras Lejanas
- Popurri Navideño
- Caminan las Nubes
- El Fuá
- Seis Mapeyé
- Seis Chorreao
- Seis Celinés
- Seis Fajardeño

== Venezuelan cuatro ==
The cuatro of Venezuela has four single nylon strings, tuned A_{3}–D_{4}–F^{♯}_{4}–B_{3} . It is similar in shape and tuning to the ukulele, but their character and playing technique are different. It is tuned in a similar fashion to the ukulele's traditional D tuning, but the B is an octave lower. Consequently, the same fingering can be used to shape the chords, but it produces a different inversion of each chord. There are variations on this instrument, having 5 strings or 6 strings.

Other Venezuelan cuatro variants include:

cinco cuatro	5 strings in 4 courses
seis cinco	6 strings in 5 courses
cinco y medio	5 normal-length strings and an extra, 6th short string from the top of the body
cuatro y medio	4 normal-length strings plus an extra, 5th short string
octavo	8 strings in 4 double-string courses

== Cuatros in other countries ==
Certain variants are considered the national instrument of some countries (e.g., Venezuela). The cuatro is widely used in ensembles in Jamaica, Mexico, and Suriname to accompany singing and dancing. In Trinidad and Tobago it accompanies Parang singers. In Saint Lucia the cuatro is used as an accompanying instrument in traditional Sewenal music at Christmas time.

== See also ==
- Banjo
- Cavaquinho – a Brazilian instrument very similar to a cuatro.
- Stringed instrument tunings
