= Sky Fits Heaven =

Promotional single by Madonna

from the album Ray of Light
- A-side: "Drowned World/Substitute for Love"
- Released: October 2, 1998
- Recorded: 1997
- Studio: Larrabee North; (North Hollywood, California)
- Genre: Trance; drum and bass
- Length: 4:48
- Label: Maverick; Warner Bros.
- Songwriters: Madonna; Patrick Leonard
- Producers: Madonna; William Orbit; Patrick Leonard

Licensed audio
- "Sky Fits Heaven" on YouTube

"Sky Fits Heaven" is a song recorded by American singer Madonna for her seventh studio album, Ray of Light (1998). It was written and produced by Madonna and Patrick Leonard; the song also contained additional production from William Orbit, and lyrical interpretations from British poet Max Blagg's 1992 poem, What Fits?. Uncredited in the album's official liner notes, Blagg's role in the song was the subject of several publications questioning Madonna's inspiration behind the track. A remix was created by Sasha and Victor Calderone, and was released as a promotional single by Maverick and Warner Bros. on October 2, 1998.

When released, various music critics appreciated Orbit's extensive production on "Sky Fits Heaven". On a list of Madonna's best non-singles compiled by Idolator, the track was ranked at number nine and acclaimed by critic Sal Cinquemani who enjoyed its "heavenly hook". The Sasha and Victor Calderone remix reached number 41 on Billboard's Dance Club Songs chart in November 1998, despite not being released as a commercial single. "Sky Fits Heaven" was performed on Madonna's Drowned World Tour in 2001, accompanied by flying acrobats during a Japanese-inspired sequence.

== Background ==
In 1992, poet Max Blagg's work What Fits? was used in commercials for Gap Inc., showcasing a new line of jeans worn by American actress Mädchen Amick. The poem was also used in the advertisements for the Gap on NBC. Upon viewing them, Madonna contacted Blagg for obtaining permission to use the poem in her new musical material. While composing her 1998 album Ray of Light, Madonna and Blagg reached a deal which would allow the singer to include excerpts of What Fits? within her song "Sky Fits Heaven"; in exchange, Blagg would receive no credit. The lines in particular: "Sky fits heaven so ride it / Child fits mother so hold your baby tight" would be used, with the exception of the first line which would be changed to "Sky fits heaven so fly it".

Upon its initial release on Ray of Light, Daniel Frankel of E! News questioned Madonna's intentions on the track, which he found to be extremely similar to Blagg's work; Frankel was unaware of the agreement reached between the two. George Rush and Joanna Molloy from the New York Daily News first reported the incident on March 12, 1998, and claimed that "Madonna took care of the sticky issue of credit by paying Blagg" and leaving his name out of the album notes. Francesca Chapman from Philly.com summarized the report: "Madonna's muses have ranged from the Virgin Mary to porn purveyors, so it's no shock that her latest inspiration might come from... a Gap ad."

== Composition and lyrics ==
"Sky Fits Heaven" was written and produced by Madonna and Patrick Leonard, with additional production from William Orbit. According to the sheet music published at Musicnotes.com by Alfred Publishing, "Sky Fits Heaven" is written in the key of D minor and is set in time signature of common time with a moderately fast dance beat of 126 beats per minute. Madonna's vocals range from G_{3} to B♭_{4}, leading an instrumentation of a piano and a guitar. The song follows a basic sequence of Dm–Am/D–Dm–Am/D as its chord progression. According to Hrisztalina Hrisztova-Gotthardt and Melita Aleksa Varga in their book Introduction to Paremiology (2015), the singer and Leonard use pseudo proverbs to convey general messages often expressed by "real proverbs": "Hands fits giving, so do it / If the caps fits, wear it". Further discussing the track's religious themes, Madonna confessed about the inspiration surrounding both "Sky Fits Heaven" and "Shanti/Ashtangi":

I feel that talking about it trivializes it. I've been studying the Cabala [sic], which is the mystical interpretation of the Torah. I've studied Buddhism and Hinduism and I've been practising yoga and obviously I know a lot about Catholicism. There are indisputable truths that connect all of them, and I find that very comforting and kind. My spiritual journey is to be open to everything. Pay attention to what makes sense, be absorbed. For me, yoga is the closest thing to our real nature.

The song itself sheds light on Eastern worship prayer through personal methodology, and spiritual connections between herself and her then-newborn daughter Lourdes Leon. Paul Northup from Third Way noted the singer's claim that "all paths lead to God" within the lyrics: "Isn't everyone just / Traveling down their own road / Watching the signs as they go?".

== Remixes and chart performance ==
Disc jockeys Sasha and Victor Calderone was exclusively commissioned to produce a partnered remix for "Sky Fits Heaven" in 1998. The Sasha Remix was created solely by the former while the more well known Sasha and Victor Calderone mix was composed as part of a collaboration. According to Calderone himself, he had to restructure the entire composition in order for the remix to work properly. Neither of the two musicians were able to personally meet Madonna as part of the job, which Sasha found more pressuring. Calderone would later include the finalized remix, in addition to remixes for both "Frozen" and "Ray of Light" on a demo CD released by Sony Music on October 2, 1998. On July 25 2026, Madonna included a combined remix of Victor and Peter Rauhofer on her companion remix album Veronica Electronica.

Since it was not released as a commercial single or sent for radio airplay, "Sky Fits Heaven" could not appear on any Billboard sales or airplay charts. Although the Sasha and Victor Calderone's Remix version managed to appear on Billboard's Dance Club Songs chart in 1998. The remix itself had only been released to clubs and was not physically available for purchase; however, the aforementioned version and the Sasha Remix appeared as B-side cuts on selected vinyl release of her 1998 single "Drowned World/Substitute for Love", and the respective CD single released in the United Kingdom and Japan. "Sky Fits Heaven" debuted on the chart for the week ending October 24, 1998, at number 45. The track reached its peak position at number 41, and lasted an additional three weeks on the chart before departing in its sixth week total at the bottom position at number 50.

== Critical reception ==
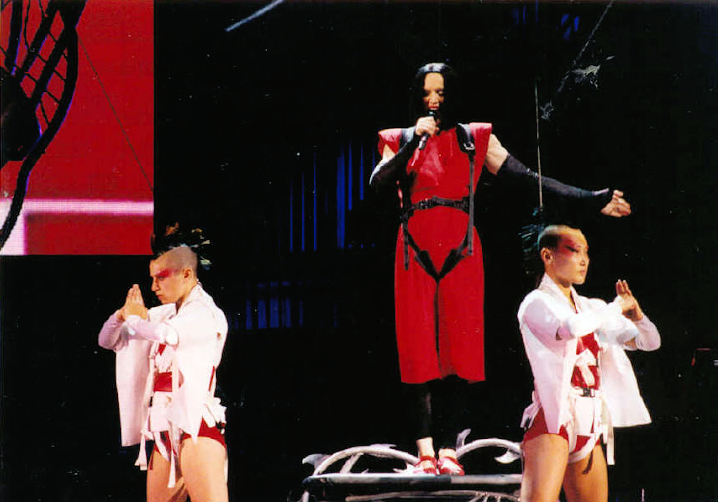
Madonna performing "Sky Fits Heaven" during the Drowned World Tour in 2001

Billboard's Michael Paoletta appreciated Madonna for helping "shine mainstream 'light' on [the] dance genre" and admitted that he "can't help but get goose bumps" from the recording, while Rolling Stone's Rob Sheffield found it "interesting". In Slant Magazine's list of "15 Greatest Madonna Non-Singles", Sal Cinquemani and Eric Henderson listed "Sky Fits Heaven" at number nine. Cinquemani claimed the song a marvel due to its "heavenly hook" and Orbit's impeccable production. In his book Kate Bush and Hounds of Love, Ron Moy disliked the singer's role of "guesting" on the recording, which he found "typical of the work of ...Orbit". Author Matthew Rettenmund included the song at number 16 on his list of songs released by Madonna. In August 2018, Billboard picked it as the singer's 52nd greatest song, calling it "one of the most musically ambitious tracks of 1990s Madonna, ["Sky Fits Heaven"] blends trance throb with drum n bass propulsion, ambient atmsopherics and even some light rock shredding for a strikingly buoyant soundscape. Madge's Max Blagg-inspired lyrical meditations occasionally border on the impenetrable, but the chorus lifts even higher than expected with an easily comprehended refrain that practically registers as career-defining".

== Live performances ==
While promoting Ray of Light on February 14, 1998, Madonna performed "Sky Fits Heaven", "Shanti/Ashtangi" and "Ray of Light" at Roxy NYC nightclub. "Sky Fits Heaven" was also included on the Drowned World Tour of 2001, to support both Ray of Light, and her eighth studio album Music (2000). For the act, Madonna appeared swinging from wires in a Japanese-inspired sequence. AllMusic's Clive Young complemented the singer's live rendition of the track, and found it surprising that she "sang every note" to the audience. During the final concert held in Los Angeles at the Staples Center, Madonna's then-husband at the time, Guy Ritchie, appeared as a samurai while wearing a Los Angeles Lakers jersey. The performance of the song on August 26, 2001, at The Palace of Auburn Hills was recorded and released in the live video album, Drowned World Tour 2001.

== Track listing and formats ==
- CD and 12" single
1. "Ray of Light" – 9:29
2. "Frozen" – 11:25
3. "Sky Fits Heaven" – 10:28

== Credits and personnel ==
Management

- WB Music Corp./Webo Girl Publishing, Inc. (ASCAP)
- WB Music Corp./No Tomato Music (ASCAP)

Personnel

- Madonna – vocals, songwriter, producer
- Mark Endert – engineer
- Jon Englesby – engineer
- Ted Jensen – mastering
- Patrick Leonard – songwriter, producer
- Pat McCarthy – engineer
- William Orbit – producer
- David Reitzas – engineer
- Matt Silva – engineer

Credits and personnel adapted from the album's official liner notes.

== Charts ==
Chart (1998)	Peak position
US Dance Club Songs (Billboard) Sasha and Victor Calderone's Remix	41

== Release history ==
Region	Date	Format	Label	Ref.
United States	October 2, 1998	CD; 12"	Maverick; Warner Bros.	
