= Drowned World/Substitute for Love =

1998 single by Madonna

Single by Madonna

from the album Ray of Light
- B-side: "Sky Fits Heaven"
- Released: August 24, 1998
- Recorded: 1997
- Studio: Larrabee North (North Hollywood, California)
- Genre: Ambient pop
- Length: 5:09
- Label: Maverick; Warner Bros.
- Songwriters: Madonna; William Orbit; Rod McKuen; Anita Kerr; David Collins
- Producers: Madonna; William Orbit

Madonna singles chronology
"Ray of Light" (1998)	"Drowned World/Substitute for Love" (1998)	"The Power of Good-Bye" / "Little Star" (1998)

Music video
- "Drowned World/Substitute for Love" on YouTube

"Drowned World/Substitute for Love" is a song recorded by American singer Madonna for her seventh studio album, Ray of Light (1998). It was written and produced by Madonna and William Orbit, with additional songwriters including Rod McKuen, Anita Kerr and David Collins. McKuen and Kerr received the credits due to the usage of a sample from one of their songs, "Why I Follow the Tigers". "Drowned World/Substitute for Love" is an ambient pop song which lyrically describes Madonna's spiritual transformation to seek authentic love over superficial alliances.

"Drowned World/Substitute for Love" was released as the album's third single on August 24, 1998, worldwide, except in the United States. It became Madonna's seventh number-one single in Spain, while charting within the top ten in Iceland and the United Kingdom. The B-side of the single, "Sky Fits Heaven", reached number 41 on the US Billboard Dance Club Play chart.

An accompanying music video was released for the song, featuring Madonna running away from the paparazzi until she arrives at home. The video faced strong reaction in the media due to the paparazzi chase sequences, a scenario similar to Diana, Princess of Wales's death in 1997. The song was performed in two of Madonna's tours, these being the Drowned World Tour (2001) and the Confessions Tour (2006). She also performed the track at the London stop of her Rebel Heart Tour (2015–16), in memory of Collins, as well as the 2016 Madonna: Tears of a Clown show in Melbourne.

== Background and release ==
From 1996, Madonna began to undergo a series of "life-changing experiences". She gave birth to her daughter Lourdes Leon, became interested in Eastern mysticism and Kabbalah, and was enlisted for the title role of Eva Perón in the film adaptation of the musical Evita (1996). A year later, following the promotion of the Evita soundtrack, she started working on Ray of Light, her seventh studio album. Madonna wrote songs with William Orbit, Patrick Leonard, Rick Nowels and Babyface but the songs from the latter did not make it to the final track list. The album would reflect the singer's changed perspectives about life. Author Carol Benson noted that it was a "deeply spiritual dance record", with the crux of it based on liberation of Madonna from her own career and the many identities she had assumed over the years. Motherhood had softened the singer emotionally, which was reflected in the songs. She started talking about ideas and used words which implied deep and personal thoughts, rather than the regular dance-floor anthemic tunes she had composed.

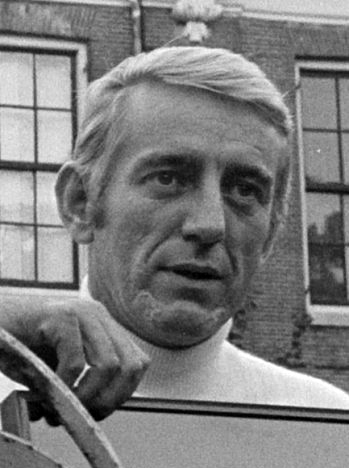
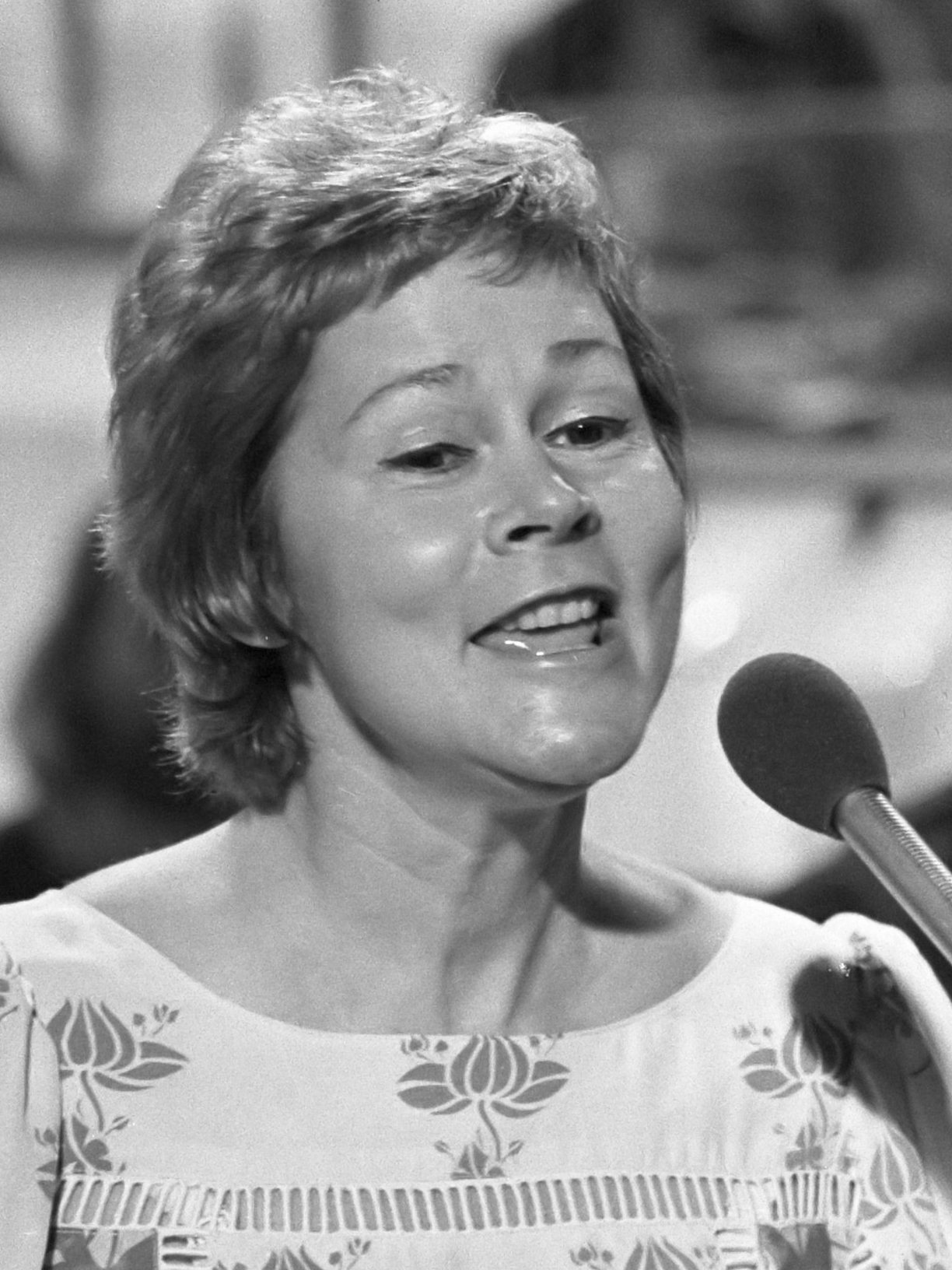
Songwriters Rod McKuen and Anita Kerr received credits on the track due to the usage of a sample from their song, "Why I Follow the Tigers".

"Drowned World/Substitute for Love", the first song on the album, was written and produced by Madonna and Orbit, with additional writers including Rod McKuen, Anita Kerr and David Collins. The singer's manager Guy Oseary had telephoned and asked Orbit for collaborating on the album. Orbit sent a 13-track digital audio tape (DAT) to Madonna, which included a demo version of the track. According to Madonna, she had been a fan of Orbit's work for a long time and was pleased with the demo. The song includes a sample from the song "Why I Follow the Tigers" by the San Sebastian Strings, a group created by both Kerr and McKuen. The vocal sample was of a man uttering the words "you see", later confirmed by him to be actor Jesse Pearson. Both McKuen and Kerr received co-writing credits on "Drowned World/Substitute for Love" due to the inclusion of the sample, and also because thematically the track follows a plotline that transpired in "Why I Follow the Tigers". Madonna was a great admirer of Collins's interior designing and had commissioned for designing a friend's night club located in Miami. He later ended up as one of the writers on the song.

The most important track on the album according to the singer, "Drowned World/Substitute for Love" was released as the third single from Ray of Light on August 24, 1998, worldwide, except in the United States. In the latter market, the album's second single "Ray of Light" had been released with a one-month delay, so Madonna's record label decided to release "Drowned World/Substitute for Love" outside of North America, thereby closing the one-month gap between the next single "The Power of Good-Bye" (1998). The song received remix treatment from musicians like Brian "BT" Transeau and Sasha, and according to Billboard was one of the most expected tracks to be remixed.

== Recording and composition ==
"Drowned World/Substitute for Love" was recorded, with the rest of the album, at Larrabee North Studio in North Hollywood, California. It was mastered by Ted Jensen at Sterling Studios in New York. An ambient pop track, it takes the title from author J. G. Ballard's post-apocalyptic science fiction novel, The Drowned World (1962). The final version progressed significantly from the DAT demo, which Orbit described as "serendipity". However they kept the initial roughness, resisting adding too many tweaks. The producer added random echoing and pulsating effects, and the drum fills were created from splicing small fragments of music. Madonna and Orbit had conducted a drummer session in Los Angeles, but it did not work out. Instead, Orbit commissioned Fergus Gerrand to play drum samples in London. Orbit fed these into his workstation and cut them manually, instead of using auto-editing software like ReCycle.

"Drowned World/Substitute for Love"
A 30 second sample from the track, from the time when the acoustic guitar comes into prominence and the sounds of piano can be heard in the distance. Arpeggios consisting of electric guitar are added in the mix, and ultimately the drum sounds become heavy.

The song begins with ambient music and the stereo sound oscillating. This continues for 40 seconds. The music is interspersed with trip hop and psychedelic elements, both at the foreground and background. As McKuen's sample utters the words "you see", Madonna utters the first lyrics, "I traded fame for love / Without a second thought", and at around the 1:30 minute mark, the drums start with the first chorus. The composition builds slowly, with a Jimi Hendrix-like guitar sound complementing the music. An acoustic guitar comes into prominence from 2:49 minute mark, and the sounds of piano can be heard in the distance. Arpeggios consisting of electric guitar are added in the mix, and ultimately the drum sounds become heavy. Orbit adds guitars and increases the volume with the electronic sounds becoming turbulent. Madonna's singing gathers momentum and intensity, belting, "No one night stand, no far off land / No fire that I can spark", when it suddenly subsides, ebbing away.

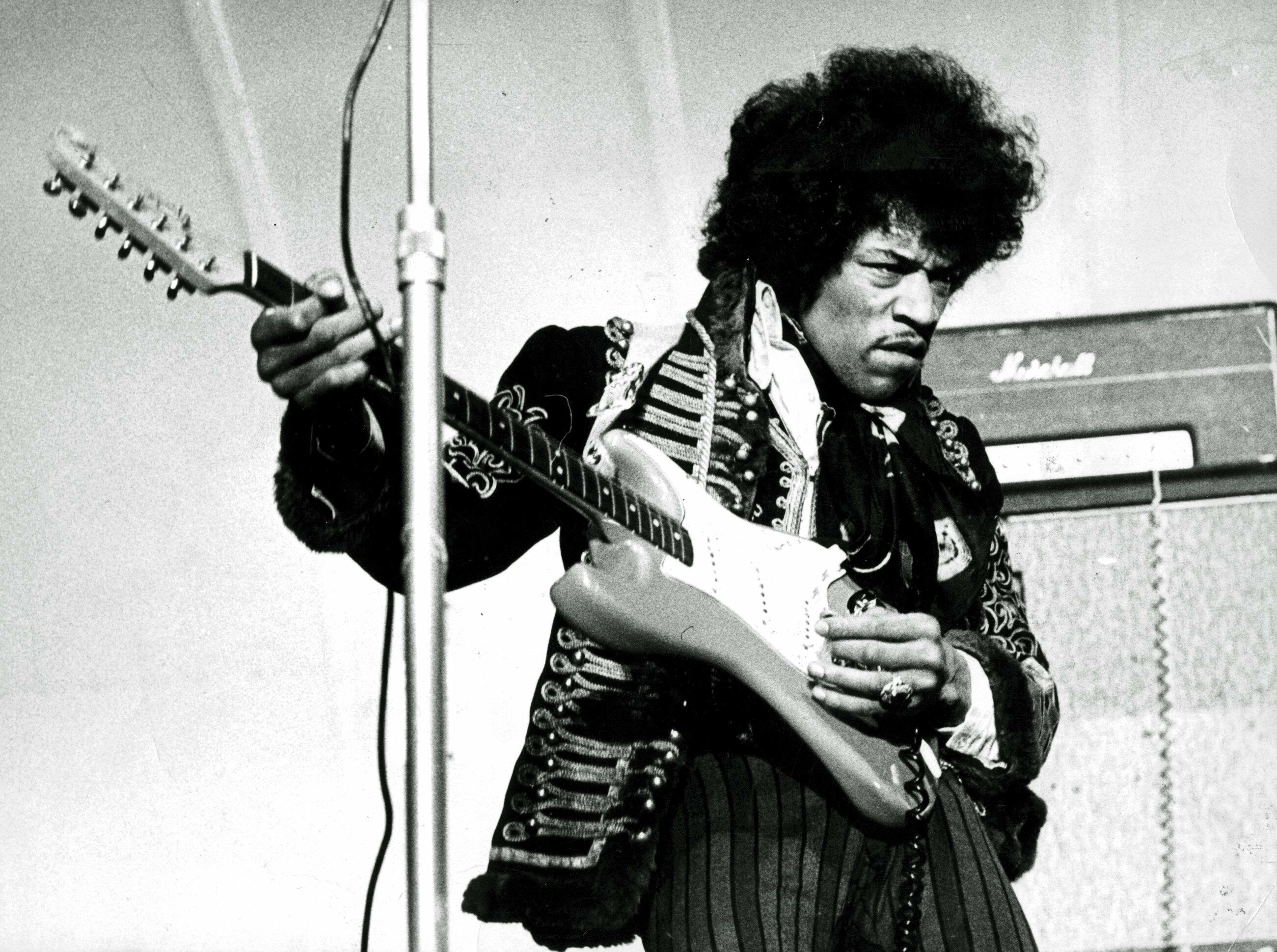
The guitar on the song was compared to that by Jimi Hendrix.

Throughout the song, her vocals are subdued in nature, emoting a thoughtful imagery, with the melody being laid out gently for the listener. Bryan Lark from The Michigan Daily described Madonna's singing and composition of the song as "soulful". According to the sheet music published on Musicnotes.com, the record is set in time signature of common time with a key of B major. It has a slow tempo of 72 beats per minute with Madonna's vocals ranging from the notes of F♯_{3} to A_{4}. The track begins with a basic chord progression of F♯5–G♯_{5}–E_{5}–A_{5}–G♯_{5}, which changes into A_{5}–G♯_{5}–B–C♯m_{7} during the rest of the verses and A–E_{9}–B♭ in the chorus.

Lyrically "Drowned World/Substitute for Love" finds Madonna taking accountability of her life, fame and adulation, while assessing her career and journey. It is a summary of her experience of fame, exemplified by lines such as, "I got exactly what I asked for [...] Running, rushing back for more [...] And now I find, I've changed my mind". Rikky Rooksby, author of The Complete Guide to the Music of Madonna noted the track ended with the line "This is my religion", indicating the spiritual thoughts and themes present in Ray of Light. According to Lucy O'Brien, author of Madonna: Like an Icon, the lyrics touch upon Madonna's desire for fame and how it ultimately ruined her personal relationships, thereby "[setting] the tone for the album". In an interview for Q magazine, Madonna explained:

"I realise, and I've been realising this for years, that the approval – the headiness of being swept up and being popular and loved by people in universal ways – is absolutely no substitute for truly being loved. But if you have to have a substitute, it's about the best there is."

== Critical reception ==
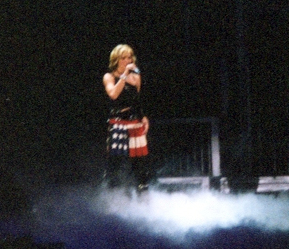
Madonna opening the Drowned World Tour with the performance of "Drowned World/Substitute for Love"

O'Brien commended the usage of electronic sounds and bleeps in the track as well as the "bell like clarity" in Madonna's vocals, saying they were "a result of the training she had received from her Evita days". Kenneth Bielen, author of The Lyrics of Civility declared the record as a "slice of Madonna's autobiography", praising the lyrics for forecasting what the singer's life could become. Allen Metz wrote in the book, The Madonna Companion, that the lyrics did not give an impression of "sophisticated wordplay", but was commendable for telling the truth about Madonna's life and career. Stephen Thomas Erlewine from AllMusic labelled the song as a "swirling" and "meditative opener". David Browne from Entertainment Weekly described the track, along with "Frozen" from the album, as "breathtaking", complimenting its beats. Sal Cinquemani from Slant Magazine found Madonna's belting to be the most "emotionally candid" she has been since Like a Prayer (1989).

Other critics complimented the different nature of the song and its production. Reviewing the album for The Michigan Daily, Lark said, "['Drowned World/Substitute for Love'] [creates] a brilliant, ecstatic pop catharsis that all but eclipses every mistake she's ever made, including the virginal writhing, gold-tooth sporting and naked hitchhiking of her sordid past", the last part referring to Madonna's antics during her fifth studio album, Erotica (1992) era. Rob Sheffield from Rolling Stone found it to be the "perfect opener" for Ray of Light and its various contradiction filled tracks. Noting the different musical elements, including drum loops, strings, computer bleeping as well as jungle snares, Sheffield compared them to a person's shopping experience and unpacking of the bags after the activity ends. The reviewer ended by saying that the track came off as "loud, tacky and ridiculous", but still exuded emotion in the music. In a review of Madonna's hits album GHV2 (2001), Charlotte Robinson from PopMatters commended Orbit's production work on the track along with others from Ray of Light. She added that the songs are "a testament to his ability to use gadgets and electronic wizardry not to alienate listeners, but to draw them in".

'Substitute for Love', Stuart Maconie wrote in a Q review of Ray of Light, "emerges languorously from a fog of enigmatic samples and the low-key burbling that are Orbit's forte… prayer bells tinkle and snare fills skim the surface tension of the song in a nod to drum 'n' bass." In 2003, fans voted for their top 20 Madonna singles in Q, and awarded "Drowned World/Substitute for Love" the number 17 spot. Rolling Stone placed the track at number 20, on their ranking of Madonna's 50 Greatest Song in 2016, describing it as "a ballad exploring epiphanies about fame and family". While ranking Madonna's singles in honor of her 60th birthday, The Guardian's Jude Rogers placed the song at number 12, calling it "majestic, reflective and sung in a subdued style for Madonna [...] this meditation on fame with a Ballardian reference in its title soars quietly and gorgeously".

== Chart performance ==
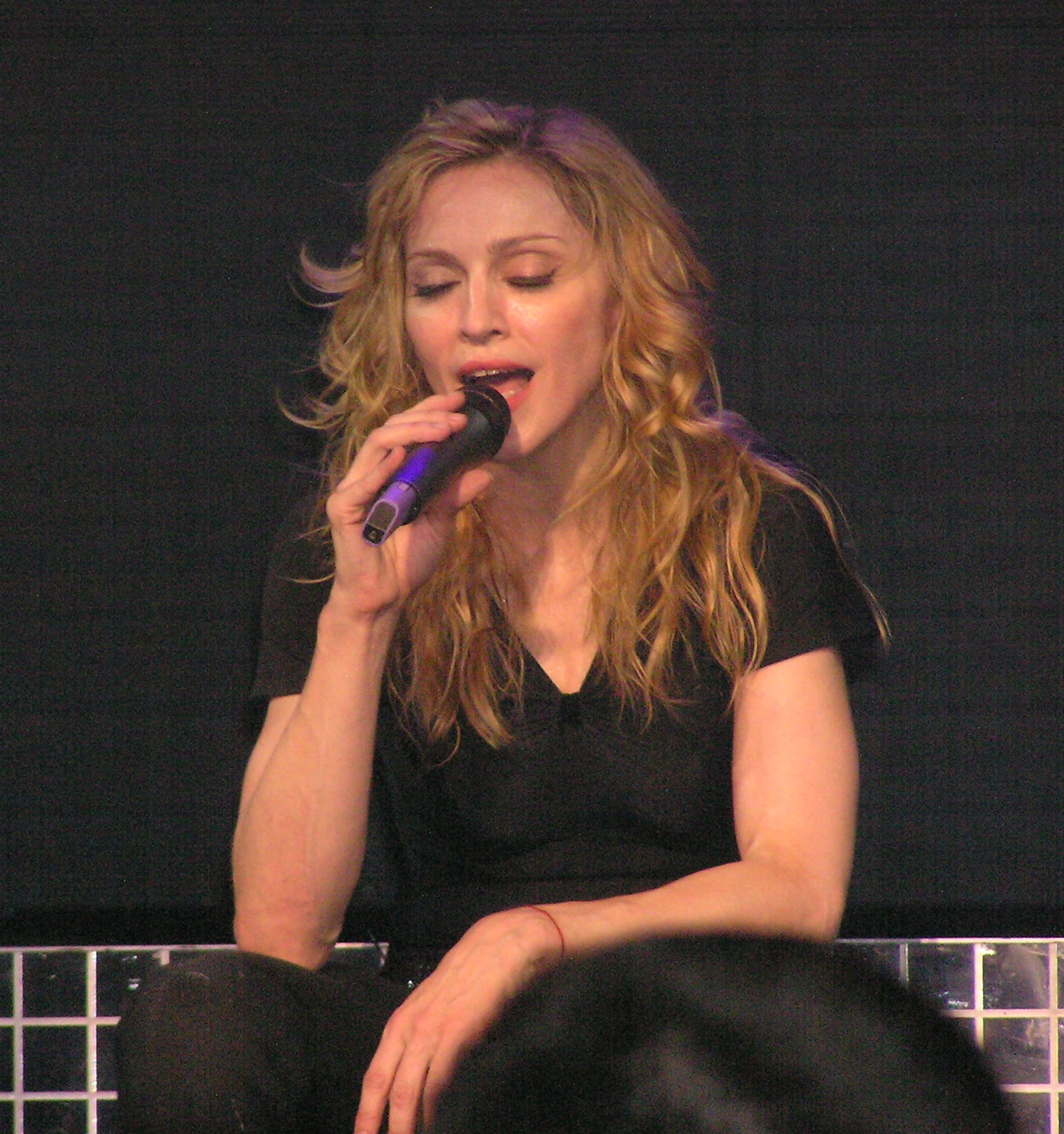
Madonna performing an acoustic version of the song on the Confessions Tour (2006)

In the United Kingdom, "Drowned World/Substitute for Love" debuted and peaked at number 10 on the UK Singles Chart on September 5, 1998. It quickly descended down the charts, being present for a total of nine weeks within the top-100. The song has sold a total of 90,651 copies in the country as of August 2008, according to the Official Charts Company.

In mainland Europe, "Drowned World/Substitute for Love" entered the official Spanish Singles Chart at number 10 on the issue date August 29, 1998. The next week, it jumped to number one, where it stayed for one week. It was the third single from Ray of Light to reach the top of the chart—Madonna's seventh single overall—following "Frozen" and "Ray of Light". In Austria, the song peaked at number 34, staying in the charts for only one week. In Switzerland, it reached its peak position number 31 on the second week, staying in the charts for five weeks in total. The song had more success on the French Singles Chart, where it debuted at number 88 and gradually moved up the charts, finally peaking at number 42 and staying in the charts for 17 weeks. In the Netherlands, the song debuted at number 63, and rose to number 43 for one week. In Sweden, the song debuted at number 41 but fell to number 57 the next week.

In Australia, the single debuted at number 74, climbing to its peak of number 16 the following week before descending down the charts. On the New Zealand Singles Chart, the song debuted at number 30, until rising to its peak of number 21, and then descending down. Since the song was not released in the United States, it did not chart on the Billboard Hot 100 or any other component charts. However, the B-side of the single, "Sky Fits Heaven", reached number 41 on the US Billboard Dance Club Play chart, aided by its remixes.

== Music video ==
Madonna being chased by paparazzi in the music video, a scene reminiscent of the incidents that led to the death of Diana, Princess of Wales.

The accompanying music video for "Drowned World/Substitute for Love" was directed by Walter Stern and filmed in June 1998 at London's Claridge's Hotel and Piccadilly Circus. It includes cameo appearances by Anita Pallenberg and Steve Strange. It was released in September 1998, and features Madonna leaving her home and being chased by paparazzi. Dressed in black, she is constantly running, even from the other celebrities in a hotel bar. Except for Madonna's, everyone else's face is distorted. In another sequence of the clip, Madonna passes a hotel maid smiling at her. The singer returns the smile when the flash of a camera goes off; the maid has just taken a picture of her. Madonna flees again, running all the way home to her daughter's arms, singing that she has "changed her mind" about being a celebrity.

The video generated controversy due to the scenes that featured Madonna being chased by paparazzi on motor-bikes, a scenario similar to the incidents that led to the death of Diana, Princess of Wales in 1997. Madonna's publicist Liz Rosenberg said that the clip had nothing to do with Diana's death and was instead about "Madonna's relationship to fame [...] There are paparazzi in the video. But it's not like Madonna hasn't had experience with them. It's a day in the life of Madonna." Daily Mirror columnist Matthew Wright said "The similarities [to Diana's death] are undeniable", finding it disgusting.

The clip was initially reported by Billboard to be released in the US outlets after the release of the video for "The Power of Good-Bye", but the plan did not materialize. It was finally included on the DVD compilation, The Video Collection 93:99. In 2013, a poll by Logo TV about "Madonna's 55 Best Music Videos" listed the clip at number 11, describing it to be "just as much about the ugly comforts of celebrity and its reality-distorting side-effects. This underrated clip is one of Madonna's most personal statements, and her vocals are downright chilling". The manga like distorted faces of the celebrities in the clip was listed by Dazed magazine as one of "five favourite manga-eyed moments from pop videos".

== Live performances ==
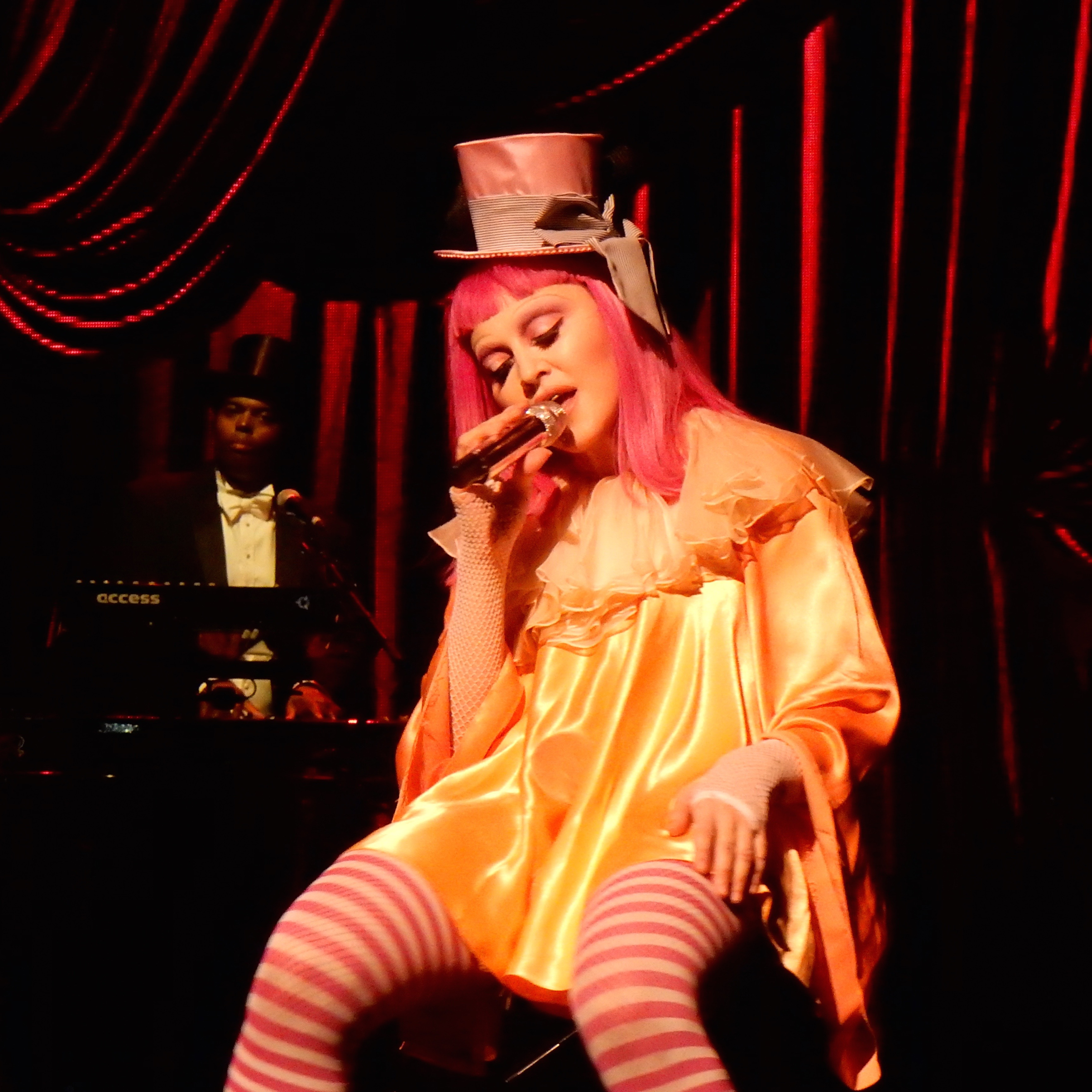
Madonna performing the song during her Tears of a Clown concert in Melbourne, Australia in March 2016

On November 23, 1998, Madonna appeared on the Spanish RTVE show El Séptimo de Caballeria and performed "Drowned World/Substitute for Love", along with her other song "The Power of Good-Bye". Three years later, Madonna named her 2001 Drowned World Tour after the song, and performed it as the opening number. She entered the stage amidst billows of dry ice, dressed in a sleeveless black top, crossover top with one net sleeve, jeans with zips and bondage straps, a studded dog collar and a tartan kilt and performed the song standing on a rising platform on the middle of the stage. Also during this same tour, the last lyrics from the song ("Now, I find I changed my mind/This is my religion") were used at the end of the performance of "Ray of Light". The performance at The Palace of Auburn Hills in Auburn Hills, Michigan on August 26, 2001, was released in the live video release, Drowned World Tour 2001. Michael Hubbard from MusicOMH gave the performance a positive review, saying it was sung beautifully. Joshua Clover from Spin described Madonna's arrival during the performance as "[the singer] taking the style war to stage".

During the Confessions Tour in 2006, Madonna sat down on the middle of the stage and performed an acoustic, stripped-down version of the song. She was joined by Yitzhak Sinwani of the London Kabbalah Centre, who had also been present earlier in the show for the performance of the song "Isaac". Writing for Pitchfork Media, Stephen Deusner complimented Madonna's singing, saying that " she's got a deeper, heartier range that works best on ballads like 'Drowned World'". The song was not included on the NBC special, The Confessions Tour: Live from London, which aired on November 22, 2006, but it was present on the full-length DVD release. The track was performed on the London stop of the Rebel Heart Tour, on December 2, 2015, at The O_{2} Arena, in memory of Collins who had died in 2013. The following year, it was included on the setlist of her Madonna: Tears of a Clown show in Melbourne, Australia. Madonna entered the stage riding around on a tricycle and wearing a clown costume consisting of a yellow dress, stockings, a pink wig and a clown nose.

== Track listings and formats ==
- UK and European 12-inch vinyl
1. "Drowned World/Substitute for Love" (BT & Sasha's Bucklodge Ashram Remix) – 9:28
2. "Sky Fits Heaven" (Sasha Remix) – 7:21
3. "Sky Fits Heaven" (Victor Calderone Remix Edit) – 5:50
- European, UK and Japanese CD single 1
1. "Drowned World/Substitute for Love" (Album Version) – 5:09
2. "Drowned World/Substitute for Love" (BT & Sasha's Bucklodge Ashram Remix) – 9:28
3. "Sky Fits Heaven" (Sasha Remix Edit) – 4:08
- European and UK CD single 2
1. "Drowned World/Substitute for Love" (Album Version) – 5:09
2. "Sky Fits Heaven" (Sasha Remix) – 7:21
3. "Sky Fits Heaven" (Victor Calderone Remix Edit) – 5:50
- Digital single (2023)
1. "Drowned World/Substitute for Love" (Album Version) – 5:09
2. "Drowned World/Substitute for Love" (BT & Sasha's Bucklodge Ashram Remix) – 9:29
3. "Sky Fits Heaven" (Sasha Remix Edit) – 4:09
4. "Sky Fits Heaven" (Victor Calderone Remix Edit) – 5:50
5. "Sky Fits Heaven" (Sasha Remix) – 7:24

== Personnel ==
Personnel are adapted from the Ray of Light album liner notes.

- Madonna – main vocals, songwriting, production
- William Orbit – songwriting, production
- Rod McKuen – songwriting, background vocals
- Anita Kerr – songwriting
- David Collins – songwriting
- Steve Sidelnyk – drum programming
- Mark Endert – engineering
- Jon Ingoldsby – engineering
- Patrick McCarthy – engineering
- Dave Reitzas – engineering
- Matt Silva – engineering
- Ted Jensen – mastering
- Rankin – photography
- Kevin Reagan – art direction

== Charts ==
=== Weekly charts ===
Weekly chart performance for "Drowned World/Substitute for Love"
Chart (1998)	Peak position
Australia (ARIA)	16
Austria (Ö3 Austria Top 40)	34
Belgium (Ultratip Bubbling Under Flanders)	8
Canada (Nielsen SoundScan)	18
Eurochart Hot 100 (Music & Media)	22
France (SNEP)	42
Germany (GfK)	39
Hungary (Mahasz)	4
Iceland (Íslenski Listinn Topp 40)	2
Italy (FIMI)	5
Netherlands (Dutch Top 40)	27
Netherlands (Single Top 100)	43
New Zealand (Recorded Music NZ)	21
Scottish Singles Sales (Official Charts)	9
Spain (AFYVE)	1
Sweden (Sverigetopplistan)	41
Switzerland (Schweizer Hitparade)	31
UK Singles (Official Charts)	10

=== Year-end charts ===
Year-end chart performance for "Drowned World/Substitute for Love"
Chart (1998)	Position
Iceland (Íslenski Listinn Topp 40)	24
Italy (Musica e dischi)	100
Netherlands (Dutch Top 40)	216

== See also ==
- List of number-one singles of 1998 (Spain)
- List of UK top 10 singles in 1998

== Bibliography ==
- Bielen, Kenneth (2016). The Lyrics of Civility: Biblical Images & Popular Music Lyrics in American Culture. Routledge Publishing. ISBN 978-1-317-71351-7.
- Clerk, Carol (2002). Madonnastyle. Omnibus Press. ISBN 0-7119-8874-9.
- Guilbert, Georges Claude (2004). Madonna As Postmodern Myth. McFarland. ISBN 0-7864-1408-1.
- Metz, Allen; Benson, Carol (1999). The Madonna Companion: Two Decades of Commentary. Music Sales Group. ISBN 0-8256-7194-9.
- O'Brien, Lucy (2008). Madonna: Like an Icon. HarperCollins. ISBN 978-0-593-05547-2.
- Rooksby, Rikky (2004). The Complete Guide to the Music of Madonna. Omnibus Press. ISBN 0-7119-9883-3.
- Salaverri, Fernando (2005). Sólo éxitos: año a año, 1959–2002 (1st ed.). Spain: Fundación Autor-SGAE. ISBN 84-8048-639-2.
- Taraborrelli, Randy J. (2002). Madonna: An Intimate Biography. Simon & Schuster. ISBN 978-1-4165-8346-2.
