= List of number-one singles of 1998 (Spain) =

This is a list of the Spanish PROMUSICAE Top 20 Singles number-ones of 1998.

== Chart history ==
Issue date	Song	Artist
3 January	"Candle in the Wind 1997"	Elton John
10 January	"Candle in the Wind 1997"	Elton John
17 January	"Candle in the Wind 1997"	Elton John
24 January	"Torn"	Natalie Imbruglia
31 January	"Torn"	Natalie Imbruglia
7 February	"Torn"	Natalie Imbruglia
14 February	"All I Have to Give"	Backstreet Boys
21 February	"Torn"	Natalie Imbruglia
28 February	"Frozen"	Madonna
7 March	"Frozen"	Madonna
14 March	"Frozen"	Madonna
21 March	"El Club de Los Humildes"	Mecano
28 March	"Frozen"	Madonna
4 April	"El Club de Los Humildes"	Mecano
11 April	"La Copa de la Vida"	Ricky Martin
18 April	"La Copa de la Vida"	Ricky Martin
25 April	"My Heart Will Go On"	Céline Dion
2 May	"My Heart Will Go On"	Céline Dion
9 May	"Ray of Light"	Madonna
16 May	"Ray of Light"	Madonna
23 May	"Ray of Light"	Madonna
30 May	"Corazón prohibido"	Gloria Estefan
6 June	"Corazón prohibido"	Gloria Estefan
13 June	"Corazón Partío"	Alejandro Sanz
20 June	"Corazón Partío"	Alejandro Sanz
27 June	"Corazón Partío"	Alejandro Sanz
4 July	"Happy World"	Blue 4 You
11 July	"Happy World"	Blue 4 You
18 July	"Happy World"	Blue 4 You
25 July	"Happy World"	Blue 4 You
1 August	"Happy World"	Blue 4 You
8 August	"Oye!"	Gloria Estefan
15 August	"Oye!"	Gloria Estefan
22 August	"Oye!"	Gloria Estefan
29 August	"Oye!"	Gloria Estefan
5 September	"Music Sounds Better with You"	Stardust
12 September	"Drowned World/Substitute for Love"	Madonna
19 September	"Only When I Lose Myself"	Depeche Mode
26 September	"Only When I Lose Myself"	Depeche Mode
3 October	"Only When I Lose Myself"	Depeche Mode
10 October	"Only When I Lose Myself"	Depeche Mode
17 October	"Contigo"	Rosana
24 October	"Contigo"	Rosana
31 October	"Outside"	George Michael
7 November	"Outside"	George Michael
14 November	"Outside"	George Michael
21 November	"Believe"	Cher
28 November	"Believe"	Cher
5 December	"Believe"	Cher
12 December	"Believe"	Cher
19 December	"Believe"	Cher
26 December	"Believe"	Cher

== See also ==
- 1998 in music
- List of number-one hits (Spain)
