= Ray of Light (song) =

1998 single by Madonna

Single by Madonna

from the album Ray of Light
- B-side: "Has to Be"
- Released: April 27, 1998
- Recorded: 1997
- Studio: Larrabee North; (North Hollywood, California)
- Genre: EDM; acid house; psychedelic pop; dance-pop; electronic rock; disco
- Length: 5:21
- Label: Maverick; Warner Bros.
- Songwriters: Madonna; William Orbit; Clive Maldoon; Dave Curtiss; Christine Leach
- Producers: Madonna; William Orbit

Madonna singles chronology
"Frozen" (1998)	"Ray of Light" (1998)	"Drowned World/Substitute for Love" (1998)

Music video
- "Ray of Light" on YouTube

"Ray of Light" is a song by the American singer Madonna. It is the title track from her seventh studio album, Ray of Light (1998), and was released as the album's second single on April 27, 1998, by Maverick Records. The song was also included on the compilation albums GHV2 (2001), Celebration (2009) and Finally Enough Love: 50 Number Ones (2022). Written by Madonna, William Orbit, Clive Maldoon, Dave Curtiss, and Christine Leach and produced by Madonna and Orbit, "Ray of Light" is based on Curtiss Maldoon's "Sepheryn" and is an electronic dance song with techno, trance, Eurodance, and disco influences. "Ray of Light" consists of a main synth sound oscillating on the primary musical note and an electric guitar riff. Lyrically, the song has a theme of freedom.

The song has received critical acclaim by music critics for its club-friendly, electronic sound, lyrics, and "emotional warmth". The song was also nominated for three Grammy Awards: Record of the Year, Best Dance Recording, and Best Short Form Music Video, winning the last two at the 41st Annual Grammy Awards. "Ray of Light" debuted and peaked at number five on the Billboard Hot 100, becoming Madonna's highest debut on the chart to date. It also reached number one on the Hot Dance Club Songs chart. Internationally, the song reached the top five in the Canada, Finland and on the United Kingdom Singles Chart, and peaked at number one in Croatia, Greece, Scotland, and Spain.

An accompanying music video for "Ray of Light" was directed by Jonas Åkerlund and shows scenes from different cities around the world, with Madonna singing the song in front of them. The video was critically acclaimed, receiving the Grammy Award for Best Short Form Music Video, as well as winning five awards at the 1998 MTV Video Music Awards. Later, Stefano Salvati accused her of plagiarizing the concept of a music video for "Non é Mai Stato Subito" he directed for Biagio Antonacci in 1994. The song has been performed in four of Madonna's concert tours, the last being the Celebration Tour (2023–24). It has been covered by a number of artists, and has been featured in several elements of popular culture, such as on the FOX show Glee, as well as different advertising campaigns.

== Background and release ==
Since 1996, Madonna went through a number of "life-changing experiences" which included giving birth to her daughter Lourdes Leon, gaining interest in Eastern mysticism and Kabbalah, as well as earning the title role of Eva Perón in the film adaptation of the musical Evita (1996). A year later she started working on Ray of Light, her seventh studio album. Madonna wrote songs with William Orbit, Patrick Leonard, Rick Nowels and Babyface. The album would reflect the singer's changed perspectives about life. Author Carol Benson noted that it was a "deeply spiritual dance record", with the crux of it based on Madonna's career, her journey and the many identities she had assumed over the years. Motherhood had softened the singer emotionally, which was reflected in the songs. She started talking about ideas and used words which implied deep and personal thoughts, rather than the regular dance-floor anthemic tunes she had composed.

Madonna worked primarily with Orbit after Guy Oseary, Maverick Records' partner, phoned Orbit and suggested that he send some songs to the singer. He sent a 13-track digital audio tape (DAT) to Madonna, and "Ray of Light" was among these tracks. It is based on the track "Sepheryn" (1971), by English folk music duo Curtiss Maldoon (consisting of Dave Curtiss and Clive Maldoon). In 1996, English singer and songwriter Christine Leach, Maldoon's niece, had recorded her version of the track. Leach said she had always loved the duo's work and "Sepheryn" was her favorite. She worked for a time with Orbit and recorded a demo of "Sepheryn" over a melody on which he was working. Leach rewrote the chorus and also removed a few bits from the original composition. Orbit included it in the DAT thinking that Leach had written the song. After Madonna heard the demo she liked it, and reworked the lyrics to create "Ray of Light".

The track was released as the second single from the parent album on April 27, 1998, in the United Kingdom. In the United States, the single was released to retail on June 23, 1998, along with 40,000 copies of the song's music video. Curtiss was not aware of the fact that Madonna had recorded "Sepheryn" as "Ray of Light" and heard it for the first time being played on the radio. He "couldn't believe it" and was initially a bit annoyed, but became pleased when he learned that he would receive 15% of the royalties, as he had a songwriter credit. Madonna took 30% of the royalties, another 15% was given to Maldoon's estate and the rest was earned by Madonna's record company Warner Records. The singer said about the song: "It's totally out of control. The original version is well over 10 minutes long. It was completely indulgent, but I loved it. It was heartbreaking to cut it down to a manageable length." The original version was to be included on a compilation album titled Veronica Electronica, but it was not released. Curtiss confirmed in an interview with The Australian in January 2017, that he recorded a contemporary jazz version of "Sepheryn".

== Recording and composition ==
"Ray of Light" was recorded along with the rest of the album at Larrabee North Studio in North Hollywood, California during mid-1997. It was mastered by Ted Jensen at Sterling Studios in New York. The DAT contained the main portion of the song recordings, as well as preliminary demo sessions in Madonna's house in New York, as well as Hit Factory Studios where Madonna first sang the song. Like most of the album, the synth sounds recorded for "Ray of Light" were played on a Roland Juno-106. Madonna and Orbit had conducted a drummer session in Los Angeles, but it did not work out. So he contacted Fergus Gerrand who played drum samples for him in London. Orbit fed them in his workstation and cut them manually, instead of using auto-editing software like ReCycle.

"Ray of Light"
A 30 second sample of the song, illustrating part of the first verse and the chorus. The sample shows the techno elements present in the track, as well as disco, trance, and Eurodance influences. "Ray of Light" has received stylistic comparisons to psychedelic, and acid music.

An electronic dance music song, "Ray of Light" has stylistic influences from acid electronica. According to biographer Lucy O'Brien who wrote in Madonna: Like an Icon, Orbit created a sensurround like atmosphere in the track, which sees Madonna deepen her dance roots and go for a more electronic sound. According to the sheet music published by Musicnotes.com, the song is set in common time, with a moderately fast tempo of 126 beats per minute. It is composed in the key of B♭ major, and has a basic sequence of B♭–E♭ as its chord progression.

The song starts with an electric guitar riff comparable to the music of English alternative rock band Oasis. The chords harmonize with each other, continuing for 22 seconds. The techno melody then begins, consisting of a main synth sound oscillating on the primary musical note, with the EQ moving between the bass and the treble. The "restless" beat is accompanied by a rock-inspired chord riff, with Madonna's pitch being higher than the other tracks from the album. While recording, Orbit kept "Ray of Light" a semitone higher than the singer's limit, resulting in a strain added to the vocals. "She got frustrated when we were recording but you want that bit of edge with singers, that thing of reaching. You can't fake it, and you can hear it when she cracks it on the record," he recalled. Before the final chorus there is a synth solo again, reminiscent of a 1970s prog-rock record. According to Rikky Rooksby, author of The Complete Guide to the Music of Madonna, this was a link to the origin of the song from "Sepheryn".

Lyrically, the track is upbeat, keeping in theme with the music. According to Madonna the verses are a mystical look at the universe and how small we are compared to it. She wanted to capture a feeling of "wonderment" with the lyrics, as if some one has just opened their eyes and looked at the world for the first time. With NME, Madonna further clarified that the lyrics convey the feeling of being small in comparison to the vast universe. It also talks about how regular life goes on faster "than the speeding light", but one can get out of that journey and look at themselves from an outsider's perspective.

== Critical reception ==
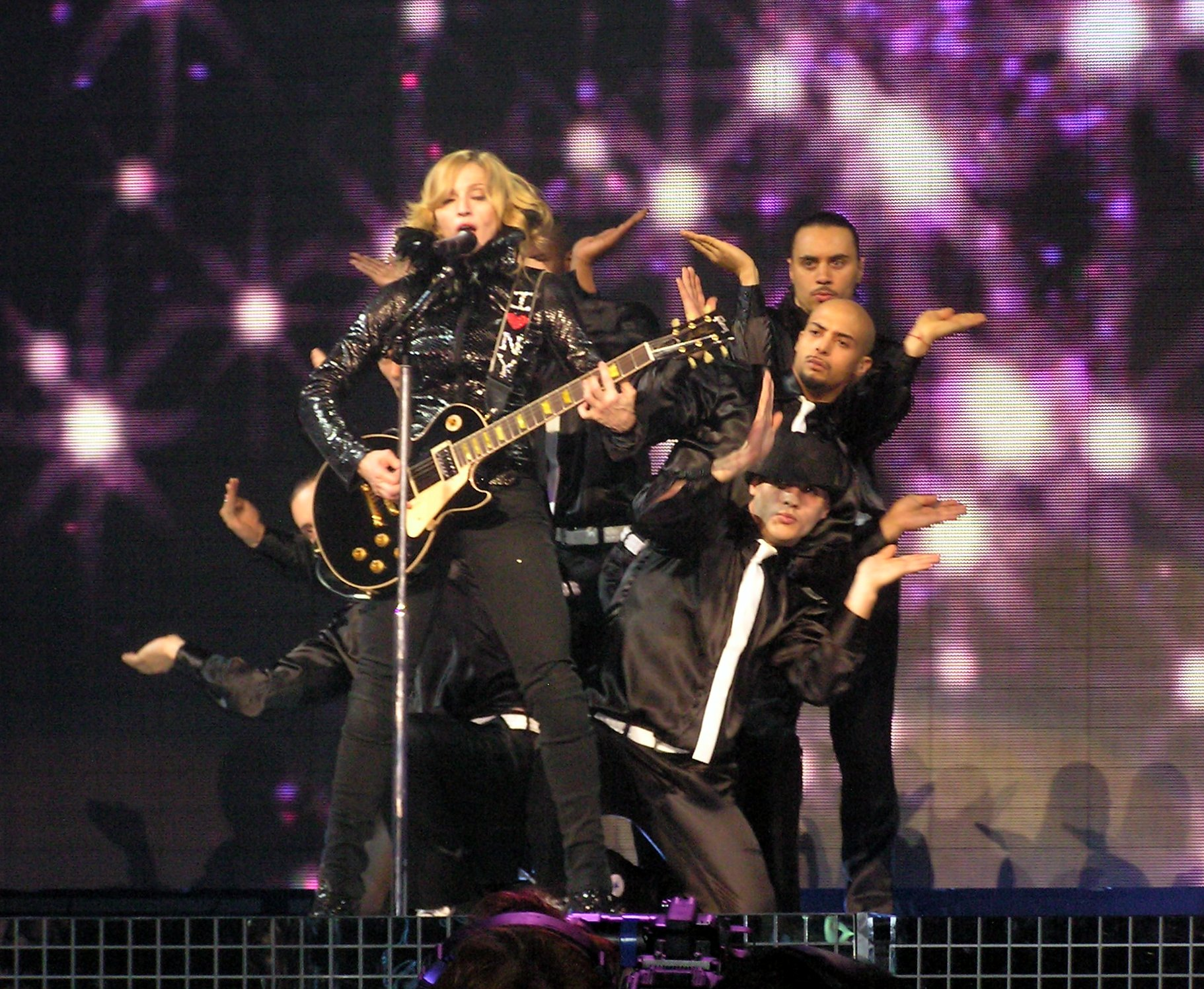
Madonna, flanked by her dancers, performs "Ray of Light" during the Confessions Tour (2006)

"Ray of Light" received acclaim from music critics. In a review of the album as a whole, Stephen Thomas Erlewine of AllMusic described it as "swirling". In a review of the maxi CD single, Liana Jonas of the same website called the track a "wickedly good club song" and "sonically progressive yet listener-friendly". She also praised Madonna's vocals, comparing them to those of a "club diva to celestial goddess". "The title track builds from another incongruously pretty guitar arpeggio into thumping rave anthem mode," Stuart Maconie wrote in a Q review of Ray of Light, "but always underscored with keen musical intelligence. It could be a lighter, less one-dimensional Chemical Brothers."

Larry Flick of Billboard described it as Madonna at her best, calling it a "spiritually charged, often poetic song". He especially mentioned the flexible vocals and Madonna's progression as a recording artist. British Music Week named it Single of the Week, adding, "Madonna is bang on form and this brilliant, anthemic, stand-out dance track [...] is further confirmation that motherhood and experience have only refuelled her creative ambition and commercial wisdom." Rob Sheffield from Rolling Stone in his review for the album as a whole, wrote that, alongside other tracks such as "Swim" and "Drowned World/Substitute For Love", Madonna is "positively ferocious" sounding on "Ray of Light". Sal Cinquemani of Slant Magazine wrote that the song was a "celebratory tech-frenzy", and noted Madonna's elated singing. In a review of Madonna's second hits compilation, GHV2 (2001), Cinequemani wrote:

Like no other Madonna hit in recent memory, the frenetic "Ray of Light" found the singer in a celebratory tech-frenzy. Whether it was an epiphany of the spiritual or sonic kind, her elation was unmistakable. Orbit's cycles of analog synths and electric guitar licks perfectly supplemented the elasticity of Madonna's newly-trained vocal chords. Not since "Deeper and Deeper" had she reached such dizzying heights.

A reviewer from Sputnikmusic listed the track as a recommended listen from Ray of Light. O'Brien found the track to be an "ecstatic hymn to the skies". The A.V. Club's Stephen Thompson commented that the "pumped-up title track is bound to be a deserving smash". J.D. Considine of The Baltimore Sun noted that Madonna's "newfound strength is particularly apparent in pulsing, rhythm driven tracks like ['Ray of Light'], which finds her soaring confidently at the top of her register on the busily percolating chorus, then whispering breathily on the brief, dream-like bridge". David Browne, while reviewing Ray of Light for Entertainment Weekly, deemed the song a "sirenlike techno-glitter-ball". Ranking Madonna's singles in honour of her 60th birthday, The Guardian's Jude Rogers called it one of her "most joyous electronic pop singles".

== Chart performance ==
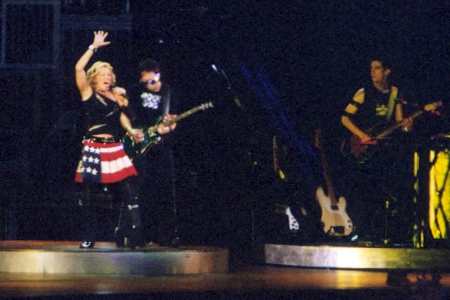
Madonna performing "Ray of Light" during the Drowned World Tour of 2001

In the United States, "Ray of Light" premiered at number five on the Billboard Hot 100, for the issue dated July 11, 1998 with 72,000 units. It was her highest-debuting single, surpassing previous best debuts with "You'll See" (1995) and "Frozen" (1998), both of which opened at number eight. The track became the singer's then 37th top-40 hit, moving her past Connie Francis on the list of women with most top-40 chartings on Hot 100. "Ray of Light" was present for a total of 20 weeks on the Hot 100, and placed at number 75 on the year-end chart. The song also reached the top of the Hot Dance Music/Club Play chart of Billboard, remaining at the top position for a total of four weeks. "Ray of Light" was certified gold by the Recording Industry Association of America (RIAA) in September 1998, for shipment of 500,000 copies of the single across United States. In Canada, it debuted at number 85 on the RPM Singles Chart and reached number three in its eighth week. It was present on the chart for a total of 30 weeks.

In Australia, "Ray of Light" debuted on the ARIA Singles Chart at its peak of number six on May 24, 1998, staying there for one week. It was present for a total of 17 weeks on the chart, and was certified gold by the Australian Recording Industry Association (ARIA) for shipment of 35,000 copies of the single. At the year-end charts of ARIA, "Ray of Light" was the 57th best-selling Australian single of 1998. In New Zealand, "Ray of Light" also debuted at its peak position of number nine on the RIANZ Singles Chart. It was present for a total of 14 weeks on the chart and fell out on September 13, 1998, at number 31.

In the United Kingdom, "Ray of Light" debuted with 76,000 copies and peaked at number two on the UK Singles Chart on May 9, 1998, being held off from the number one spot by All Saints's "Under the Bridge / Lady Marmalade", which also debuted the same week with about 31,000 more copies than "Ray of Light. The British Phonographic Industry (BPI) certified it gold for sales and streams of 400,000 units. According to the Official Charts Company, "Ray of Light" has sold 275,000 copies in the region as of August 2008. The track debuted at its peak of number nine on the Eurochart Hot 100 Singles chart, for the issue dated May 16, 1998. In Belgium, "Ray of Light" was moderately successful in both territories, peaking at number 25 in Flanders and 33 in Wallonia. In the Netherlands, the song debuted at number 45 on the Dutch Top 40, and reached a peak of 22 on May 16, 1998, remaining there for three weeks. The song reached a peak of number two in Finland, where it remained for two weeks, before spending a total of five weeks on the chart. In Sweden, it reached number 14 and spent 10 weeks on the chart. On the Swiss Singles Chart, "Ray of Light" debuted at its peak of number 32 on the issue dated May 24, 1998. The song also reached number one in Spain on its debuting week. It stayed on the top spot for three weeks before descending the chart.

== Music video ==
=== Background and development ===
The music video for "Ray of Light" was directed by Jonas Åkerlund, who had previously shot the controversial clip for the song "Smack My Bitch Up" (1997) by the Prodigy. Madonna had been planning the video from the time she was filming the clip for previous single "Frozen" in the Mojave Desert. "Smack My Bitch Up" was her current favorite and she enlisted Åkerlund. Madonna stated that when she makes an album, she "puts [her] soul on it", but a music video is a lot more working with a director. With the Ray of Light album, she wanted to have videos with fresh ideas, and hence wanted to collaborate with new directors. She liked Åkerlund's "special way of working" and spoke with him over the telephone. Their conversations continued for over six months, and most of the time was spent coming up with a final concept for the clip. Åkerlund said in an interview with Swedish newspaper Aftonbladet:

I had two ideas that did not fit the song. She said no even though I had a very clear idea of how she would look in the video. I worked up on another idea and brought together a featured band for her to see. I did it all in front of me. [...] In retrospect, it feels good, the video we have done much better suited to the track than the first ideas. [Madonna] has an incredible track on everything she is doing. Style, music, business — she has a mental track of every single thing and won't give up until she is completely satisfied. And on music videos there is nothing she does with one hand on her back — she's engaged to one hundred percent.

The Koyaanisqatsi-inspired music video features fast-moving blurred images of daily life. Italian director Stefano Salvati accused Madonna of plagiarizing a clip he made.

According to the singer, the clip portrays "a day in the life of the earth to show that we are rushing forward to the end of the 1900s century at full speed. I think Jonas made an excellent interpretation of the song, although he forced me to dance like crazy for two days. He's a tough director". Reviewers compared it to the 1982 American experimental film Koyaanisqatsi, which showed time-lapse footage of cities. Madonna's scenes were shot on March 25 and 26, 1998 at Raleigh Studios and Florentine Gardens in Los Angeles. Background scenes were shot in various cities such as Los Angeles, New York, London, Las Vegas, and Stockholm. Test shots taken in Stockholm were presented to Madonna, for conveying the idea behind the clip, but they were deemed good enough to be used in the final product.

=== Filming and production ===
During filming Åkerlund was accompanied by three of his Swedish employees, photographer Henrik Halvarsson, production designer Mattias Lindgren, and editor Max Vitali. Madonna's daughter Lourdes was also present on set. Åkerlund remembered that one day after the filming he got a call from Mick Jagger for directing the new music video for the Rolling Stones; however, he had to decline since "Ray of Light" consumed all his time. They filmed for over 14 days, during which he fit the crew in one car, found an angle for the 35 mm camera and waited as the shots were taken one by one. He had to carry a diagram in his pocket the whole time, which had all the plans for every frame they shot. Every ten seconds they captured one frame and continued for half-an-hour to get around five seconds of footage, resulting in "Ray of Light" being the longest shoot ever for a music video for Åkerlund. They also mounted the camera on a bus and rode around New York capturing footage.

Madonna insisted that the video be edited in Los Angeles, since during the "Frozen" video she had a number of back-and-forths with director Chris Cunningham (who was in London editing), a process she did not want to repeat. This therefore involved Åkerlund and his team briefly relocating to a hotel in Los Angeles, where the editing took place. Every piece of filmed footage was included in the final video, due to every scene being sped up and the song's moderate length.

=== Release and reception ===
The music video premiered on MTV Live on May 12, 1998. The clip starts with the rising of the sun and a man opening the curtains in his house, before it progresses into the Koyaanisqatsi-inspired section, featuring time-lapse images of daily life, from people riding a subway, ordering food, bowling, and children in a classroom to sped-up cityscapes and freeways at night. Interspersed in the scenes is Madonna dancing and singing the track, her image partially merged with the backdrop of the sped-up cityscapes. During the intermediate verse the high-speed motion stops, with the camera focusing on Madonna only against a sunset backdrop but quickly speeds up again. As the clip continues into nightfall, high-speed images of Madonna dancing in a discothèque is shown, with the camera focusing on the revelers. She suddenly starts screaming. After that she is seen falling asleep on the dance floor, and a revolving shot of planet Earth.

On June 23, 1998, the clip was released on VHS as a limited edition of 40,000 copies by Warner Music Vision. It had sold 7,381 copies by the month after its release, becoming the best-selling video single of the Nielsen SoundScan era. The video charted on Billboard's Music Video Sales chart for a total of 13 weeks. A few days after its release, Italian director Stefano Salvati accused Madonna's Warner Bros. Records imprint Maverick Records for plagiarizing the concept of a music video he directed for Biagio Antonacci's 1994 single "Non è Mai Stato Subito". According to Salvati, copies of his videos were submitted to Maverick before the "Ray of Light" video was shot and requested it to be pulled from distribution. Both clips featured the respective singers performing at regular speed against a backdrop of high-speed images. However, he did not sue the singer or her companies.

With "Ray of Light", Madonna debuted her "Earth Mother" look, complete with long strawberry blond hair and bronzed body. Author Georges Claude Guilbert wrote in his book, Madonna as Postmodern Myth, that her "straggly, expensively unwashed look" was comparable to that of singer Alanis Morissette and to Venetian paintings. According to Madonna, she went for an Italian Renaissance look, invoking work of painter Raphael and Sandro Botticelli. Guilbert found the singer's description as catering to postmodernism, in tune with the zeitgeist, and noted that it was just one of her "many reinventions". The book recalled how Madonna "quickly grew tired of the Botticelli-Earth Mother phase" with subsequent singles being promoted with a new Asian-inspired look. In the book Ex-foliations: Reading Machines and the Upgrade Path, author Terry Harpold commented about the time-lapse sequences, especially the image of a clock and its hands rotating through the hours. He felt that the clip portrays daily life as a futile attempt for survival, enhanced by another shot showing the sonogram of a fetus in utero, and a hamster running on a wheel. Santiago Fouz-Hernández, one of the authors of Madonna's Drowned Worlds, described Madonna as esoteric in the clip, as well as portraying "skin-deep Beverly Hills spiritualism". The video can be found on the Madonna compilations The Video Collection 93:99 (1999) and Celebration: The Video Collection (2009).

== Accolades and recognition ==
In 1999, "Ray of Light" won two Grammy Awards for Best Dance Recording and Best Short Form Music Video at the 41st Annual Grammy Awards. It was nominated for Record of the Year, but lost to Celine Dion's "My Heart Will Go On". Furthermore, The Village Voice ranked it as the fourth best in 1998 in its Pazz & Jop critics' poll. At the 1999 ASCAP Rhythm and Soul Awards, the track was the Top Dance Song winner. It also won the category of Most Performed Song at the ASCAP Pop Awards the same year. The 1999 Ivor Novello Awards nominated the record in the category of International Hit of the Year

"Ray of Light" is also often ranked as being one of the best songs of the 1990s. In 2003, Q Magazine ranked it at number 609 in its list of the "1001 Best Songs Ever". In 2005, the song was placed at number 401 on Blender's "The 500 Greatest Songs Since You Were Born". On Slant Magazine's list of the best singles of the 1990s, in which "Ray of Light" was placed 16th, a reviewer wrote that the song's "beat is restless", and that "Ray of Light" is "a standout single" due to its "emotional warmth". Pitchfork ranked the track as the 55th best song of the 1990s, describing it as "a Kabbalah-coded ode to divine femininity with a racing pulse, "Ray of Light" is body music for the embodied consciousness." Billboard placed it at number five on their ranking of Madonna's best songs, saying that it "marked a new chapter in her illustrious career". In another ranking for the singer's 50 Greatest Songs by Rolling Stone, "Ray of Light" attained a rank of number eight, with a writer from the magazine noting Madonna's "most powerfully sung vocals to date". In May 2018, Billboard ranked the top songs of 1998, ranking "Ray of Light" at number nine. Joe Lynch from the publication asserted that the composition "gave radio its most joyous, ebullient and life-affirming dance banger... Yeah, the cool kids had been raving for years, but it took a trendsetting 39-year-old mom to crack open the top 40 for what was then called electronica's eventual pop takeover." One month later, The Guardian listed it as Madonna's fourth best single. Similarly, Entertainment Weekly listed it as her fifth greatest single.

The music video received a total of eight MTV Video Music Awards nominations at the 1998 MTV Video Music Awards, eventually winning five; for Video of the Year, Best Female Video, Best Direction, Best Editing and Best Choreography, becoming her most-winning song at the show. It was the first time that the singer won the Video of the Year award; Madonna said she was grateful for MTV's recognition of the clip. At the International Dance Music Awards, it won the trophy for Best Dance Video, and at the Much Music Video Awards, the clip won the Best International Video trophy. Other awards was won at the 1998 Music Video Production Association ceremony, winning the category of Best Pop Video of the Year. The video came atop a ranking of "The Top 10 Videos That Broke The Rules", issued by MTV on the channel's 25th anniversary in August 2006. In 2016, Rolling Stone listed it at position two on their ranking of "Madonna's 20 Greatest Videos" with Bilge Ebiri from the publication calling it a "bold embrace of electronica that got Madonna her due at the VMAs".

== Live performances ==
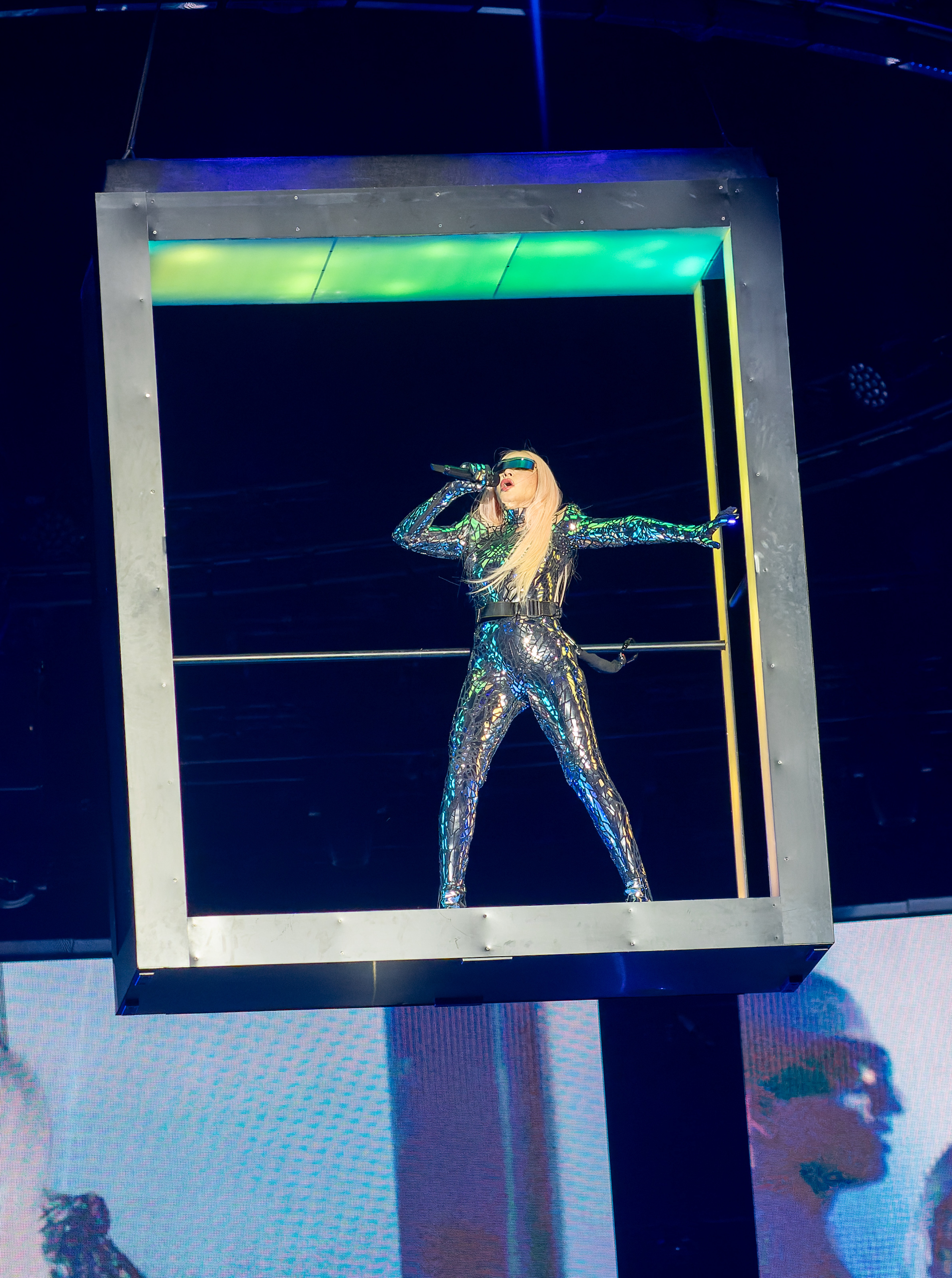
Madonna floating inside a glass box singing "Ray of Light" during the 2023-2024 Celebration Tour

In February 1998, Madonna premiered "Ray of Light" during a surprise concert at the Roxy NYC nightclub for promoting the parent album. Three months later she appeared on The Oprah Winfrey Show and performed it along with album track "Little Star". During the 1998 MTV Video Music Awards Madonna started performing "Shanti/Ashtangi", sporting black hair and wearing an Indian sari. Lenny Kravitz then appeared playing the guitar, which paved way to "Ray of Light". A religious group called the World Vaishnava Association (WVA) claimed that Madonna offended Hindus with the performance by wearing Hinduism symbols on her head. A spokesperson for the association stated that the mark (called an Om) is a symbol of chastity, harmony and purity, and is designed to show "dedication to God". The representative also said that because Madonna simulated a sexual act and wore a see-through tank top onstage while wearing the mark, she offended both Hindus and Yogis. A spokesperson for Madonna stated that the singer did not understand why WVA was upset as she had not done anything insulting, and did not wish to insult anyone. However, the vice president of WVA claimed that "the Hindu community and Eastern spiritual seekers the world over should be happy for Madonna personally in terms of her genuine interest in enlightened life, and grateful to her for her sincere efforts to attract others to the same".

"Ray of Light" has also been featured in the set lists of four Madonna tours – 2001's Drowned World Tour, 2006's Confessions Tour, 2008–2009's Sticky & Sweet Tour, and 2023–2024's The Celebration Tour. On the Drowned World Tour, it was included as the fifth song on the Neo-Punk segment, where the singer performed it wearing punk inspired clothing, and the backdrop screens showed an extended version of the song's music video. This time, the electric guitar was played by Monte Pittman. Michael Hubbard from MusicOMH noted that "things quickly hotted up with [...] 'Ray Of Light', a track that was quite simply as sublime as it was infectious". In 2005, Madonna performed "Ray of Light" during the Live 8 benefit concert, and a year later at the 2006 Coachella Valley Music and Arts Festival in Indio, California. During her 2006 Confessions Tour, Madonna included a rock version of "Ray of Light" as the second song of the show's third act, the Glam-Punk segment. For this performance the singer played the electric guitar and urged the audience to jump-along. She was accompanied by six male backup dancers, dressed in black outfits and white ties doing a synchronized choreography. Rolling Stone called the performance "hard-rocking".

"Ray of Light" was next performed by Madonna during the 2007 Live Earth concert in London's Wembley Stadium again accompanied by a guitarist. Madonna's performance at the event was watched by 4.5 million people. For the 2008–09 Sticky & Sweet Tour, "Ray of Light" was included as the third song of the show's final segment. This time, Madonna played the electric guitar again and wore a futuristic outfit with a breastplate and a short wig. She was accompanied by her dancers who were dressed in futuristic outfits and performed a robotic choreography. While reviewing the tour in 2008, Jim Farber from New York Daily News called the performance of the song one of the "highest-energy" dance numbers of the show. On December 6, 2016, Madonna performed the song during the Carpool Karaoke segment of The Late Late Show with James Corden. The singer performed "Ray of Light" at Leonardo DiCaprio's annual fundraising gala in Saint-Tropez, France on July 27, 2017. On the 2023–24 Celebration Tour, Madonna performed the Sasha Ultra Violet remix of the song while floating above the crowd in a glass box. Joe Lynch of Billboard praised Madonna as the track is "a tough one to sing, but she didn’t short shrift the audience with an abbreviated version", and noted that "her live vocals sounded fairly close to the original".

== Covers and usage in media ==
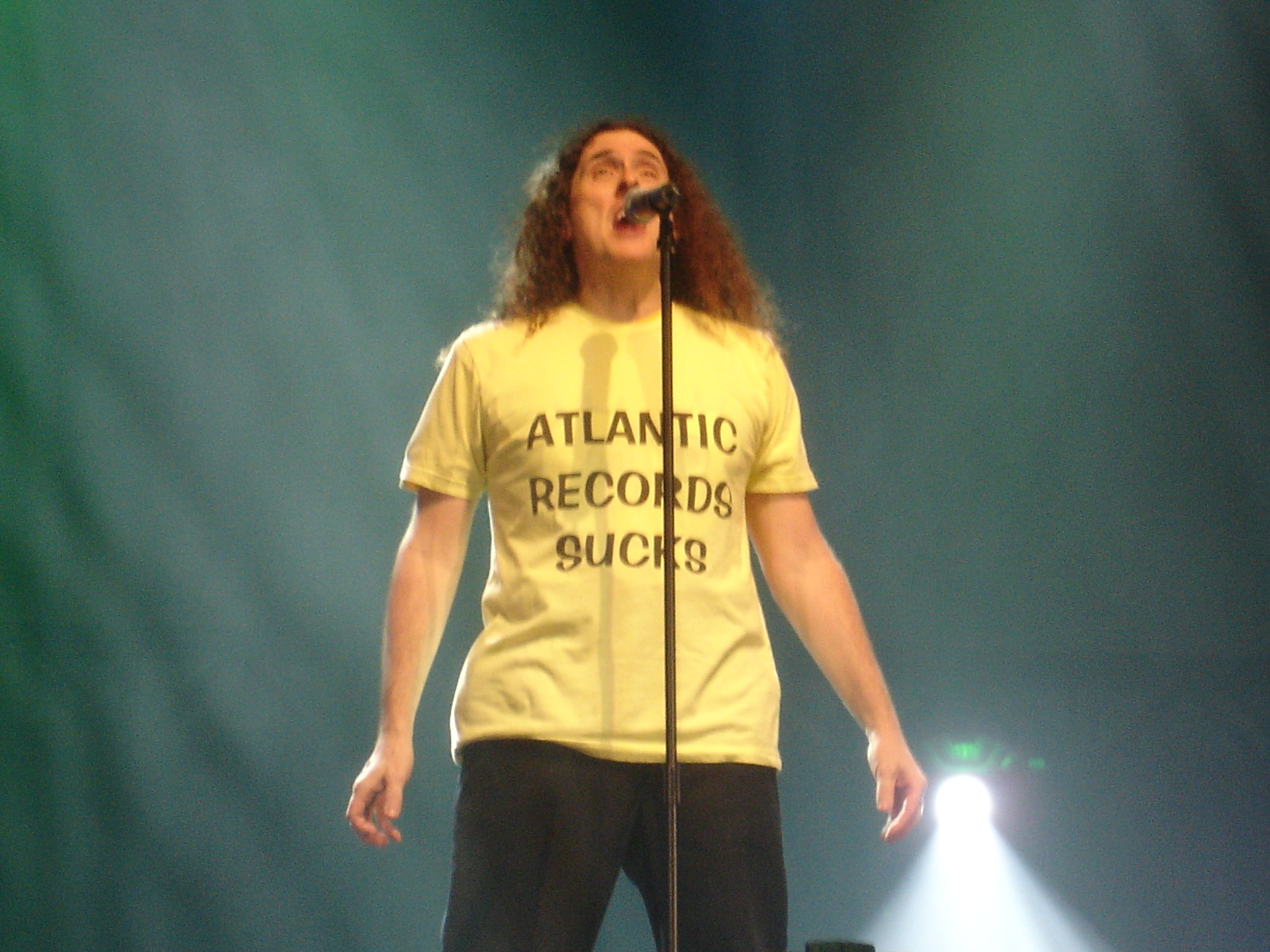
"Weird Al" Yankovic (pictured) was the first recording artist to cover "Ray of Light" and included it on his medley "Polka Power!" in 1999.

"Weird Al" Yankovic's medley "Polka Power!" from the 1999 album Running with Scissors includes a polka version of the chorus of "Ray of Light". On the 2004 compilation Platinum Blonde NRG, Vol. 2: Nrgised Madonna Classics, a Hi-NRG cover is performed by Future Force. English singer Natasha Bedingfield recorded a cover version of "Ray of Light" for BBC Radio 1's 40th anniversary; played during The Chris Moyles Show on September 19, 2007, the track was included on the Radio 1: Established 1967 compilation album. Bedingfield commented: "I have so much respect for Madonna after learning how hard it is to sing that song. She has an amazing voice—the range you need to sing the song is incredible". In 2008, Iggy Pop and The Stooges performed "Ray of Light" (along with "Burning Up") during Madonna's induction in the Rock and Roll Hall of Fame. That same year, a Sunsilk shampoo commercial included shots of Marilyn Monroe and Shakira with their songs well known by them, "I Wanna Be Loved By You" and "Whenever, Wherever" respectively, and ends with several video shots of Madonna to the sounds of "Ray of Light". Madonna reportedly received US$10 million for the song's usage. The commercial premiered on Super Bowl XLII. In 2010, the Glee season 1 tribute episode "The Power of Madonna" featured "Ray of Light" playing in the background as the school's cheerleading team performed a complicated stilts routine. In 2010, the song was included in the film Burlesque during a sequence in which Ali Rose (played by Christina Aguilera) rehearses for her new position as a dancer in a burlesque lounge. In the 2011 Family Guy season 9 episode "New Kidney in Town", main character Peter Griffin (Seth MacFarlane) is seen in the "Ray of Light" video after drinking Red Bull. In late 2012, American singer Adam Lambert performed a cover version on VH1 Divas, dancing through laser lights while donning a priestly black and white tunic. In August 2025, Beatport partnered with Madonna to launch the Ray of Light Global Remix Challenge, inviting producers worldwide to remix "Ray of Light" using official stems, with a grand prize valued at over US$12,000.

=== Windows XP launch campaign ===
The song was famously used by Microsoft in its 2001 advertising campaign for Windows XP. It begins with a man leaping through a green field and then lifting off into a sunny sky—a landscape lifted from Windows XP's default "bliss screen". There is also a series of images of people using Windows XP for real-time communications, to collaborate in an airy restaurant, to relay digital images of flying people, watch videos, and listen to music. Then, a snippet from the song follows the phrase: "Faster than the speeding light she's flying... You soar. Yes you can". The campaign was reworked after the September 11 attacks; according to Stephanie Ferguson (director of the company's PC Experience Solutions Marketing Group), the tagline "Prepare to fly" was changed to "Yes you can" to sidestep new concerns about air travel.

== Formats and track listings ==
- US 7-inch vinyl; Australian, UK and US cassette; Australian, Canadian, European, Japanese and US 2-track CD single
1. "Ray of Light" – 5:20
2. "Has to Be" (Non-Album Track) – 5:15
- European 3-track CD maxi-single
1. "Ray of Light" – 5:20
2. "Has to Be" (Non-Album Track) – 5:15
3. "Ray of Light" (Sasha Ultra Violet Mix) – 10:44
- Australian, Brazilian, Canadian, European, Japanese, Mexican, South African, UK and US CD maxi-single; Australian cassette 2
1. "Ray of Light" – 5:20
2. "Ray of Light" (Sasha Ultra Violet Mix) – 10:44
3. "Ray of Light" (William Orbit Liquid Mix) – 8:04
4. "Ray of Light" (Victor Calderone Club Mix) – 9:29
- Australian, European and UK CD maxi-single 2
1. "Ray of Light" (Sasha Twilo Mix) – 10:59
2. "Ray of Light" (Sasha Strip Down Mix) – 5:02
3. "Ray of Light" (Victor Calderone Drum Mix) – 5:28
4. "Ray of Light" (William Orbit Ultra Violet Mix) – 7:00
- European and UK 12-inch vinyl
1. "Ray of Light" (Sasha Ultra Violet Mix) – 10:44
2. "Ray of Light" (William Orbit Liquid Mix) – 8:04
3. "Ray of Light" (Victor Calderone Club Mix) – 9:29
4. "Ray of Light" – 5:20
- US 2× 12-inch vinyl
1. "Ray of Light" (Sasha Ultra Violet Mix) – 10:44
2. "Ray of Light" (Sasha Strip Down Mix) – 5:02
3. "Ray of Light" (Victor Calderone Club Mix) – 9:29
4. "Ray of Light" (William Orbit Liquid Mix) – 8:04
5. "Ray of Light" (Sasha Twilo Mix) – 10:59
6. "Ray of Light" (Victor Calderone Drum Mix) – 5:28
7. "Ray of Light" (William Orbit Ultra Violet Mix) – 7:00
8. "Ray of Light" – 5:20
- Canadian, Japanese and US 'special limited edition' VHS cassette
1. "Ray of Light" (Music Video) – 5:39
- Digital bundle (2023)
1. "Ray of Light" – 5:20
2. "Ray of Light" (William Orbit Ultra Violet Mix) – 7:00
3. "Ray of Light" (Sasha Strip Down Mix) – 5:02
4. "Ray of Light" (Victor Calderone Club Mix) – 9:29
5. "Ray of Light" (Sasha Twilo Mix) – 10:59
6. "Ray of Light" (William Orbit Liquid Mix) – 8:04
7. "Ray of Light" (Sasha Ultra Violet Mix) – 10:44
8. "Ray of Light" (Victor Calderone Drum Mix) – 5:28
9. "Has to Be" – 5:15

== Credits and personnel ==
Credits and personnel adapted from the Ray of Light album liner notes.

- Madonna – vocals, songwriting, producer
- William Orbit – songwriting, producer
- Clive Maldoon – songwriting
- Dave Curtiss – songwriting
- Christine Leach – songwriting
- Pat McCarthy – engineer

== Charts ==
=== Weekly charts ===
Weekly chart performance for "Ray of Light"
Chart (1998)	Peak position
Australia (ARIA)	6
Austria (Ö3 Austria Top 40)	31
Belgium (Ultratop 50 Flanders)	25
Belgium (Ultratop 50 Wallonia)	33
Canada (Nielsen SoundScan)	7
Canada Top Singles (RPM)	3
Canada Contemporary Hit Radio (BDS)	3
Canada Dance/Urban (RPM)	16
Croatia (HRT)	1
Eurochart Hot 100 (Music & Media)	9
European Radio Top 50 (Music & Media)	1
Finland (Suomen virallinen lista)	2
France (SNEP)	18
Germany (GfK)	28
Greece (IFPI)	1
Hungary (Mahasz)	6
Iceland (Íslenski Listinn Topp 40)	9
Ireland (IRMA)	16
Italy (FIMI)	2
Italy Airplay (Music & Media)	1
Netherlands (Dutch Top 40)	17
Netherlands (Single Top 100)	22
New Zealand (Recorded Music NZ)	9
Scottish Singles Sales (Official Charts)	1
Spain (AFYVE)	1
Sweden (Sverigetopplistan)	14
Switzerland (Schweizer Hitparade)	32
UK Airplay (Media Control UK)	3
UK Singles (Official Charts)	2
US Billboard Hot 100	5
US Adult Pop Airplay (Billboard)	39
US Dance Club Songs (Billboard)	1
US Dance Singles Sales (Billboard)	2
US Pop Airplay (Billboard)	13
US Music Video Sales (Billboard)	4
US Rhythmic Airplay (Billboard)	32

=== Year-end charts ===
1998 year-end chart performance for "Ray of Light"
Chart (1998)	Position
Australia (ARIA)	57
Canada Top Singles (RPM)	16
Eurochart Hot 100 (Music & Media)	93
France (SNEP)	93
Spain (AFYVE)	16
Taiwan (Hito Radio)	3
UK Singles (OCC)	75
US Billboard Hot 100	75
US Dance Club Play (Billboard)	1
US Music Videos (Billboard)	92

1999 year-end chart performance for "Ray of Light"
Chart (1999)	Position
US Maxi-Singles Sales (Billboard)	38

== Certifications and sales ==
Sales and certifications for "Ray of Light"
Region	Certification	Certified units/sales
Australia (ARIA)	Gold	35,000^{^}
United Kingdom (BPI)	Gold	400,000^{‡}
United States (RIAA)	Gold	500,000^{^}
United States Digital downloads	—	293,000
^{^} Shipments figures based on certification alone.^{‡} Sales+streaming figures based on certification alone.

== Release history ==
Release dates, formats and versions for "Ray of Light"
Region	Date	Format(s)	Version	Label(s)	Ref.
United Kingdom	April 27, 1998	12-inch vinyl; CD; cassette	Original	Maverick; Warner	
Japan	May 2, 1998	CD	Original	Maverick; Warner	
United States	May 15, 1998	Contemporary hit radio	Original	Maverick; Warner	
United Kingdom	May 18, 1998	CD	Remixes	Maverick; Warner	
United States	May 22, 1998	Hot adult contemporary radio	Original	Maverick; Warner	
Canada	May 26, 1998	CD	Original	Maverick; Warner	
United States	June 23, 1998	Video single	Original	Warner Reprise Video	
Various	March 3, 2023	Digital download; streaming	Single Remixes	Warner	

== See also ==
- Billboard Year-End Hot 100 singles of 1998
- List of Billboard Hot 100 top 10 singles in 1998
- List of European number-one airplay songs of the 1990s
- List of number-one dance singles of 1998 (U.S.)
- List of number-one singles of 1998 (Scotland)
- List of number-one singles of 1998 (Spain)
- List of UK top 10 singles in 1998

== Bibliography ==
- Clerk, Carol (2002). Madonnastyle. Omnibus Press. ISBN 0-7119-8874-9.
- Cross, Mary (2007). Madonna: A Biography. Greenwood Publishing Group. ISBN 978-0-313-33811-3.
- Fouz-Hernández, Santiago; Jarman-Ivens, Freya (2004). Madonna's Drowned Worlds. Ashgate Publishing, Ltd. ISBN 0-7546-3372-1.
- Guilbert, Georges Claude (2002). Madonna as Postmodern Myth. McFarland. ISBN 0-7864-1408-1.
- Harpold, Terry (2009). Ex-foliations: Reading Machines and the Upgrade Path. University of Minnesota Press. ISBN 978-0-8166-5101-6.
- Metz, Allen; Benson, Carol (1999). The Madonna Companion: Two Decades of Commentary. Music Sales Group. ISBN 0-8256-7194-9.
- O'Brien, Lucy (2008). Madonna: Like an Icon. Bantam Press. ISBN 978-0-552-15361-4.
- Priddey, Neil (2014). Purple Records 1971–1978. Lulu Press. ISBN 978-1-326-01205-2.
- Rooksby, Rikky (2004). The Complete Guide to the Music of Madonna. Omnibus Press. ISBN 0-7119-9883-3.
