= Frozen (Madonna song) =

1998 single by Madonna

Single by Madonna

from the album Ray of Light
- B-side: "Shanti / Ashtangi"
- Released: January 23, 1998
- Recorded: 1997
- Studio: Larrabee North; (North Hollywood, California)
- Genre: Downtempo; electronica; pop; electropop
- Length: 6:12
- Label: Maverick; Warner Bros.
- Songwriters: Madonna; Patrick Leonard
- Producers: Madonna; William Orbit; Patrick Leonard

Madonna singles chronology
| "Another Suitcase in Another Hall" (1997) | "Frozen" (1998) | "Ray of Light" (1998) |

Music video
- "Frozen" on YouTube

"Frozen" is a song by American singer and songwriter Madonna from her seventh studio album, Ray of Light (1998). Maverick and Warner Bros. Records released it as the album's lead single on January 23, 1998. "Frozen" was written by Madonna and Patrick Leonard, who both produced it in collaboration with William Orbit. The downtempo, electronica, pop and electropop ballad, which has a layered sound enhanced by synthesizers and strings, lyrically addresses a cold and emotionless man.

"Frozen" received acclaim from music critics, some of whom deemed it as a highlight from Ray of Light. The song was described as being a masterpiece, and its melodic beat and sound were defined as "cinematic". "Frozen" was also a global commercial success. In the United States, it became Madonna's sixth single to peak at number two on the Billboard Hot 100. In the United Kingdom, "Frozen" became Madonna's first single to debut at number one on the UK Singles Chart, while also reaching number one in Finland, Greece, Hungary, Italy, Scotland and Spain, and the top-five elsewhere.

The accompanying music video for "Frozen", directed by Chris Cunningham, was filmed at Cuddeback Lake in California, and features Madonna as an ethereal, witch-like, melancholy persona, who shapeshifts into a flock of birds and a black dog. The music video won a Moonman for Best Special Effects in a Video at the 1998 MTV Video Music Awards. To promote Ray of Light, Madonna performed the song live in several occasions, including its first world premiere on Sanremo Music Festival in Italy and on Wetten, dass..? in Germany. Additionally, it was performed in several of her concert tours. "Frozen" has been covered by many artists, such as Swedish hard rock band Talisman, and Polish industrial metal band Thy Disease.

In 2021, a trap remix of "Frozen", made by Canadian DJ Sickick, became viral on TikTok. On December 3, 2021, it was officially released as the first single from Madonna's entire-catalog reissue project. Madonna and Sickick released three further renditions of the remix—the version featuring Nigerian singer Fireboy DML, the version featuring American rapper 070 Shake, and the version featuring vocals from Sickick himself titled "Frozen on Fire"—all of which were supported by music videos. The Sickick remix charted within the top ten of the Billboard Dance/Electronic Songs chart, and was certified Gold in France and Poland.

== Background and release ==
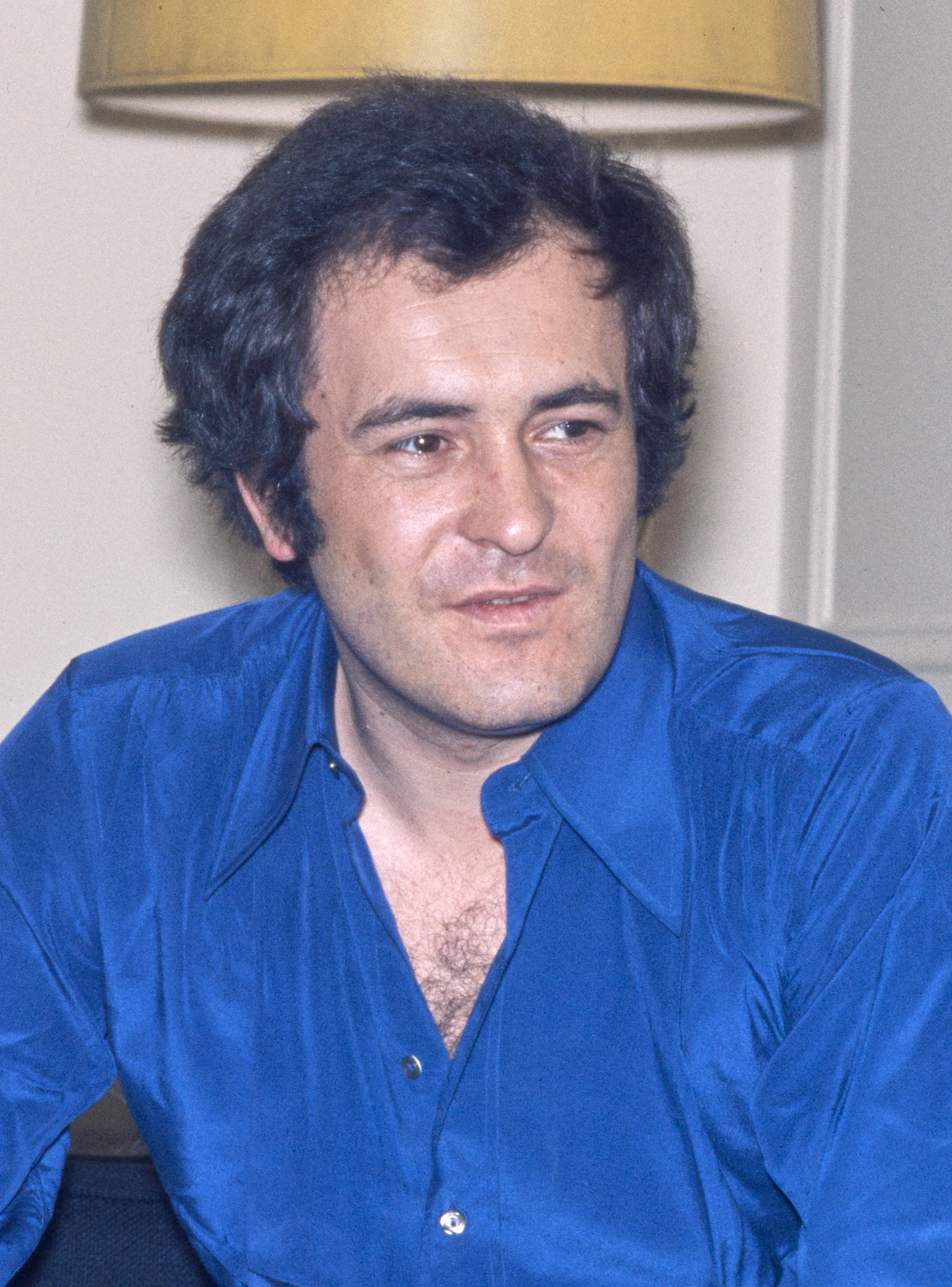
Bernardo Bertolucci's film The Sheltering Sky inspired Madonna to write "Frozen".

By the mid to late 1990s, Madonna was in a more mature and introspective mood, after giving birth to her daughter Lourdes, gaining interest in Eastern mysticism and Kabbalah, and earning the title role of Eva Perón in the film adaptation of the musical Evita (1996). In 1997, Madonna began working on Ray of Light, her seventh studio album and wrote songs with William Orbit, Patrick Leonard, Rick Nowels and Babyface. The album would reflect the singer's changed perspectives about life. Author Carol Benson noted that it was a "deeply spiritual dance record", with the crux of it based on Madonna's career, her journey and the many identities she had assumed over the years. Motherhood had softened the singer emotionally, which was reflected in the songs. She started talking about ideas and used words which implied deep and personal thoughts, rather than the regular dance-floor anthemic tunes she had composed. The singer began introspecting herself with motherhood being a "big catalyst for me. It took me on a search for answers to questions I'd never asked myself before", she said to Q magazine.

Madonna worked primarily with Orbit after Guy Oseary, Maverick Records' partner, phoned Orbit and suggested that he send some songs to the singer. He sent a 13-track digital audio tape (DAT) to Madonna, and "Frozen" was among these tracks. "I was a huge fan of William's earlier records. [...] I also loved all the remixes he did for me and I was interested in fusing a kind of futuristic sound but also using lots of Indian and Moroccan influences and things like that, and I wanted it to sound old and new at the same time", Madonna said. The singer drew inspiration from Bernardo Bertolucci's 1990 British-Italian drama film, The Sheltering Sky, which dealt with a couple trying to save their marriage during a trip to Africa. She wanted to have the "whole Moroccan/orchestral/super-romantic/man-carrying-the-woman-he-loves-across-the-desert vibe" for the track. Still continuing work with Leonard on some of the tracks, Madonna asked him to give her a composition with "tribal feel, something really lush and romantic". They composed the melody on the DAT and recorded the demo, which stretched to over 10 minutes due to Madonna continuing to write the track.

A low quality snippet of "Frozen" was leaked by fans on January 23, 1998, after it debuted on radio in Singapore, and posted it on the Internet. They said they knew what they were doing was wrong, but that they hoped it would simply generate interest from Madonna. The song was played on US radio, including WKTU New York radio. Warner Bros. Records enlisted the Recording Industry Association of America (RIAA)'s Anti-Piracy Unit to delete the Internet downloads of the song. Erik Bradley, musical director of Chicago B96, classified "Frozen" as a "the mark of a smash. Clearly, American pop radio needs Madonna", after he played the track on his station. According to Jon Uren, marketing director of Warner Music Europe, the song also had "fantastic" early support across Europe, where the song was added to radio the same day that the snippet was leaked. Shortly after the leak, a remix version of "Frozen" was broadcast by the BBC website, and was also previewed on the soundtrack at the 1998 Versace fashion spring parade. In the United Kingdom, "Frozen" was issued as a CD single, a 12-inch vinyl single, and a cassette single on February 23, 1998. The track was officially serviced to radio in the United States on February 19, 1998, and was released commercially on March 3, 1998.

== Composition and recording ==
"Frozen"
A 30-second sample of "Frozen", featuring Madonna singing the first verse, with percussion instruments and synthesizers. It then leads to the chorus, with dance rhythm and ambient sounds being added.

"Frozen" is a downtempo, electronica, pop and electropop ballad which has a layered sound enhanced by synthesizers and strings, arranged by Craig Armstrong. It was composed using common time in the key of F minor, with a moderate tempo of 102 beats per minute. "Frozen" has a basic sequence of Fm–E♭–D♭–E♭ as its chord progression. The chorus, however, has the chord progression of Fm–B♭m–G♭–A♭. Madonna's vocals range from the lower octave of F_{3} to the higher note of A♭_{4}.

The song begins with austere, classical strings while the chord progression emphasizes tonic, submediant and flattened leading-tone chords. For the second phrase, which includes a dramatic crescendo, rhythm and ambient electronic effects are added gradually. Santiago Fouz-Hernández and Freya Jarman-Ivens, authors from Madonna's Drowned Worlds, commented that the song is strongly inspired by different forms of classical music, notably contemporary classical music such as neoromanticism, as well as Italian opera composers and pieces such as Giacomo Puccini's Madama Butterfly and Giuseppe Verdi's Aida. Madonna's vocals have drawn comparisons to medieval music.

Tom Ewing of Freaky Trigger described Orbit's drum and electronic programming as "extraordinarily abstract for a global smash – a kind of cold, bassless dub approach, where the gaps, echoes and drop-outs matter as much as the beats, which spread sharply, like sudden cracks on a frozen surface. They need Armstrong's strings to hold the song together. And those strings in turn – a dark, Arctic sea of swells and crests – need the beats to sound more perilous than comforting."

Lyrically, the song is about a cold and emotionless man. In the first verse, Madonna enters in a medium range, 'You only see what your eyes want to see'. In the chorus, dance rhythm and ambient sounds are added. In the second verse, more visceral lyrics are added, like 'Love is a bird, she needs to fly'. During the bridge, a broad, string lines provide instrumental commentary on the lyrics. The song ends with a string ostinato that simply fades away, without fully resolving to the tonic chord. In an interview with The New York Times, Madonna commented that the lyrics to "Frozen" are built around "Retaliation, revenge, hate, regret, that's what I deal with in "Frozen". Everyone's going to say, 'That's a song about Carlos' [her ex-boyfriend], but it's not really; it's just about people in general".

"Frozen" was recorded along with the rest of the album at Larrabee North Studio in North Hollywood, California. It was mastered by Ted Jensen at Sterling Studios in New York. The DAT contained the main portion of the song recordings, as well as preliminary demo sessions in Madonna's house in New York, as well as Hit Factory Studios where Madonna first sang the song. Like most of the album, "Frozen" was recorded on a Roland Juno-106. Madonna and Orbit had conducted a drummer session in Los Angeles, but it did not work out. So he contacted Fergus Gerrand who played drum samples for him in London. Orbit fed them in his workstation and cut them manually, instead of using auto-editing software like ReCycle.

== Critical reception ==
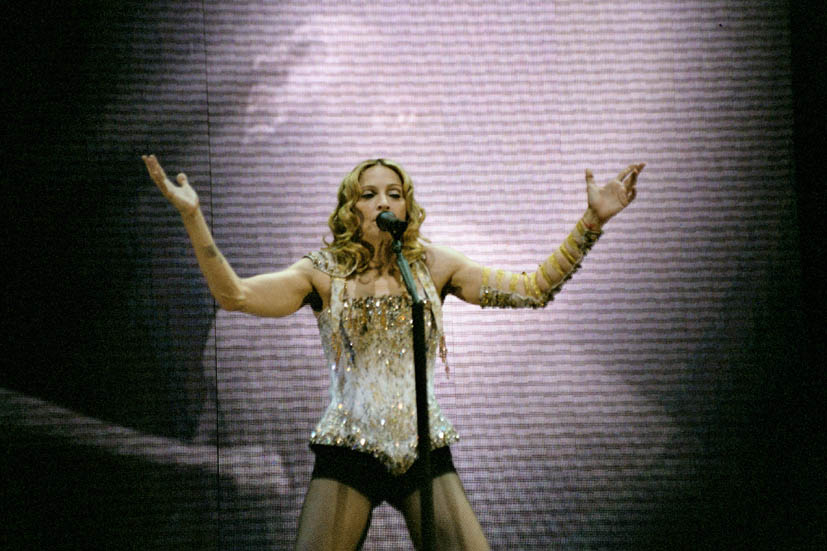
Madonna performing "Frozen" on her Re-Invention World Tour of 2004

"Frozen" received critical acclaim from music critics. Sal Cinquemani of Slant Magazine complimented the track's production and deemed it "one of the great pop masterpieces of the late 1990s", adding "Its lyrics are uncomplicated but its statement is grand." Billboard's Paul Verna described the song as "smashing". In a separate review, Larry Flick called it a "stunning foray into the realm of electronica [which] [...] underground purists and unwavering popstars will equally applaud". Rob Sheffield from Rolling Stone commented positively about the "arctic melancholy" of the song. The Baltimore Sun's J.D. Considine called it a word-focused, emotionally nuanced ballad.

Music Week named it Single of the Week, giving it five out of five and praising the song as "inspirational", "classic Madonna" and "surely guaranteed the top spot." Jon Pareles from The New York Times was impressed how Madonna, dulcet and careful, performed the song. Joan Anderman from The Boston Globe said that on Ray of Light, only "Frozen" achieves a "state of divine balladry", recalls the "emotional pitch" and simmers the "beauty of 1986's 'Live to Tell' with a dark, lush string section, the smash and patter of a lone drum, and an ominous, pulsing buzz". In his review of Ray of Light, Neil Spencer of The Observer commented, "it's sensuous songs such as [...] 'Frozen' that stand out; music for the chill-out room." The New Rolling Stone Album Guide agreed that the song was appropriate for chilling out. Elysa Gardner, writing in the Los Angeles Times, said "Madonna's enduring knack for incorporating hip and exotic textures into accessible pop tunes is evident on the plaintive single 'Frozen'". Sputnikmusic viewed the track as the singer "at her soothing best", highlighting its "interesting percussion backing" and "beautiful use of strings with techno effects".

David Browne of Entertainment Weekly described the song as a "wuthering-beats melodrama that's often breathtaking." Also from Entertainment Weekly, Chuck Arnold wrote: "sounding unlike anything Madonna had ever done before, and creating a mystical forest of sonic wonder — sweeping strings and all — 'Frozen' possesses an almost operatic grandeur that never fails to give you chills". Stephen Thompson from The A.V. Club wrote, "the atmospheric 'Frozen' is a great first single despite lyrics like, 'Love is a bird / She needs to fly.'" Conversely, NME called the song "another pile of her usual weepy old bollocks". Jim Farber of the Daily News wrote that "Frozen" compromises its electronic style with "too much tepid pop". The Guardian's Caroline Sullivan regarded it as a tremulous song Ray of Light could have done without. Jose F. Thomas from AllMusic rated the song two stars out of five, describing it as "chilly".

== Accolades ==
In 2003, Madonna fans were asked to vote for their "Top 20 Madonna singles of all-time", by Q magazine. "Frozen" was allocated the number ten spot on the list. Billboard also ranked "Frozen" at number 25 on a list containing Madonna's 40 hits, stating that the song marked a sonic change in Madonna's career. Rolling Stone also ranked the song as Madonna's sixth best song of all time according to a readers' poll, saying that the song strikes "the perfect balance of pop accessibility, sophisticated balladry and cutting-edge electronic textures". VH1's Mark Graham included "Frozen" on his list of his favorite songs from Madonna at number 36 during a list compiled in honor of the singer's 53rd birthday.

In May 2018, Billboard ranked the top songs of 1998, ranking "Frozen" at number 31. Frank Digiacomo from the publication asserted that the composition showed "a wiser, more mature Madonna, one still at the top of her game". While ranking Madonna's singles, in honor of her 60th birthday, The Guardian's Jude Rogers placed "Frozen" at number 7. She wrote: "Dark, orchestral ambient is a mood at which Madonna excels. 'Frozen' marries the different temperatures of 90s pop stunningly – the faltering chill of William Orbit's electronica with the dusty, cinematic heat of North African melodies and strings". Finally, in August 2018, Entertainment Weekly listed it as the singer's 18th best single.

== Commercial performance ==
In the United States, "Frozen" debuted at number eight on the Billboard Hot 100 with 42,000 units, and reached the number two position on the chart in the issue dated April 4, 1998. The song became the sixth single by Madonna to peak at the number two position, surpassing Elvis Presley and the Carpenters for the most number-two songs at the time. "Frozen" topped the Hot Dance Music/Club Play chart, while reaching number eight on the Hot Adult Contemporary chart. "Frozen" was certified gold by the Recording Industry Association of America (RIAA) in April 1998, and was ranked at number 32 on the Hot 100 year-end chart of the same year. In Canada, the song reached a peak of number two on the RPM Singles Chart in its seventh week, being held off from the top position by Natalie Imbruglia's "Torn".

In the United Kingdom, "Frozen" entered the UK Singles Chart at number one on March 7, 1998. It was later certified gold by the British Phonographic Industry (BPI). According to Official Charts Company, the song has sold 560,000 copies, as of 2018. In Belgium's region of Flanders, the song debuted at number 23 on February 22, 1998, and reached a peak of number three. Similarly in Wallonia, "Frozen" debuted at number 29 and later reached number two. In the Netherlands, the track debuted at number 27 on the Dutch Top 40, and reached a peak of number two on March 7, 1998. The song reached a peak of number two in Germany, where it remained for six weeks, before spending a total of nineteen weeks on the chart. In Italy, with just one day in the stores it already had 30,000 ordered copies. On the Swiss Singles Chart, "Frozen" debuted at number four in the issue dated March 1, 1998. After one week, the song reached number two, remaining there for eight weeks. The song peaked at number one in Spain.

In Australia, "Frozen" debuted on the ARIA Singles Chart at its peak of number five on March 1, 1998. The next week it descended at number nine, returning to its peak on March 15, 1998, and stayed there for another three weeks. It was present for a total of 16 weeks on the chart, and was certified gold by the Australian Recording Industry Association (ARIA). In New Zealand, the song had a similar run as in Australia, by debuting at its peak of number five on the RIANZ Singles Chart. It was present for a total of 12 weeks on the chart.

== Music video ==
Madonna with her hands covered in mehndi in the music video for "Frozen"

Directed by British artist Chris Cunningham, the music video for "Frozen" was filmed at Cuddeback Lake in the Mojave Desert in California during January 7–11, 1998. It was shot by cinematographer Darius Khondji. In an interview with Kurt Loder on the set of the video, Madonna described herself as a "mystical creature in the desert". It was inspired by the 1996 film The English Patient and Martha Graham's work. The music video premiered on February 16, 1998, on MTV at 4 p.m. The black dress Madonna wears on the video was designed by Jean Paul Gaultier. In an interview with MTV News, Cunningham stated about his work with Madonna that she became interested in working with him after seeing his Aphex Twin-directed music video, "Come to Daddy" (1997).

Madonna stated that she and her team initially thought of filming the video in Iceland, as the idea of the video was to go someplace cold with snow, but decided against the idea. She said she thought:

'You know what, I'm going to be freezing. I'm going to be miserable, I'll be complaining all day, I'll be sorry that I ever chose a cold place. So I said, 'Let's do it in the desert, it'll be warm,' and it would be sort of the opposite, because even though you think of deserts as being hot, they're still sort of frozen in terms of there's no vegetation and they're very desolate. I thought that that would still work as a visual, but then we got there and it was like 20 degrees below zero, it was bitterly cold, and I was barefoot. I was barefoot for the entire video, and then it started pouring rain and everyone got really sick, and it just actually turned out to be a really miserable experience.

"The original treatment was, like, massive piles of bodies in the desert. All these figurative sculptures made up of bodies that were all multiple Madonnas. They were all going to split and break up and change into ravens and then change into dogs. Just a performance video, but a really elaborate one using her, her clothes, and any shapes that would come out of her clothes

— Chris Cunningham talking about the original idea for the shoot.

The video introduces a sober, contemplative Madonna, revealing a mature mysticism. It begins with the camera skimming along a cracked, desiccated desert floor, and within seconds Madonna appears, dressed in black and sporting dark hair, hovering just above the ground in the distance. Her hands are covered with mehndi and an Om symbol on one palm. In the video, she slowly gestures and sways her arms towards the sky, desperately pleading to her cold lover cited in the song. At one point, she falls backward, hits the ground, and transforms into a flock of large, dark birds. Later, she transforms into a black dog. Three Madonnas also appear walking and crawling amidst the desert throughout the video. As the song progresses, the sky darkens, and the singer levitates from the ground. Her form then changes to a shiny black liquid, which runs along the desert floor and appears to be absorbed by the tattooed hands of another version of herself, curled up on the crenellated ground. The video ends with a desperate and melancholy Madonna.

Jim Glauner from MTV News commented that from the first scene of the video, the viewer discovers that this is not "Holiday" (1983). Matthias Groß in his book Madonna On the Couch: A Psychoanalytic View on Madonna's Music Videos, argued that it is interesting to look at the video as a dream, and noted that in the video, Madonna was presented as a witch or an uncanny creature, by the technique of the central perspective. He concluded that the viewers find themselves in control of their view, of the situation in general, and are conveyed the impression to follow a realistic depiction of a mere melancholic woman in the desert, according to him. Henry Keazor and Thorsten Wübbena of Rewind, Play, Fast Forward: The Past, Present and Future of the Music Video said that the large panels of cloth that gather and wind around Madonna gain an even more obvious independent movement quality. Billboard considered it Madonna's third-best video noting that it "conveys the song's bleak heartbreak perfectly" with Madonna's persona in the video. Steve Murgatroyd, Dan Williams, Steve Hiam, and Anthony Walsham received the MTV Video Music Award for Best Special Effects for "Frozen" at the 1998 MTV Video Music Awards. The video can be found on the Madonna compilations, The Video Collection 93:99 (1999) and Celebration: The Video Collection (2009).

== Sickick remixes ==
"Frozen (Sickick remix)"
- Original remix cover

Single by Madonna and Sickick
- Released: December 3, 2021
- Genre: EDM; electro; minimal; trap
- Length: 3:14
- Label: APG; Warner
- Songwriters: Madonna; Patrick Leonard
- Producers: Madonna; William Orbit; Patrick Leonard

Madonna singles chronology
| "Levitating" (The Blessed Madonna remix) (2020) | "Frozen (Sickick remix)" (2021) | "Break My Soul" (The Queens remix) (2022) |

Music videos
- "Frozen" (Fireboy DML remix) on YouTube; "Frozen" (070 Shake version) on YouTube; "Frozen on Fire" on YouTube

On March 30, 2021, Canadian producer Sickick posted a video of him in a mask remixing "Frozen" on a video sharing app TikTok. This rendition has been used in over 1.5 million TikTok clips as of December 2022, based around cooking and hair-pulling challenges; and has been watched over 26 million times. On December 3, 2021, the remix was officially released on digital retailers and music streaming platforms, as the first release of Madonna's plan of re-releasing of her entire catalogue. The Sickick remix impacted Italian radio airplay on January 24, 2022. Between March and May 2022, Madonna released three additional versions of the Sickick remix, each featuring vocals by Nigerian singer Fireboy DML, American rapper 070 Shake, and Sickick himself.

Sickick's rendition of "Frozen" is predominantly a trap song, (Note: Sources labling "Frozen (Remix)" as a trap song: Billboard, Meaww, People, and Rolling Stone.) but it also has been described as EDM, minimal, and electro. It consists of Madonna's chopped up vocals taken from the original version of the track, which has been called "now-iconic" by The Fader's Raphael Helfand. The remix begins with a line "How can life be what you want it to be? You're frozen, when your heart's not open." Billboard's Gil Kaufman called the rendition "slowed-down" and "gauzy". Shaad D'Souza of The Fader and Sebas Alonso of Jenesaispop criticized Madonna for releasing too many renditions of the remix, the former's problem was over-promotion, while the latter's point was that they were short.

Commercially, "Frozen (Remix)" debuted at number 20 on Billboard's Hot Dance/Electronic Songs chart, gathering 496,000 U.S. streams and 1,800 units. On April 16, 2022, the rendition ascended to number ten on the chart, becoming Madonna's third top ten song on the survey, while being first for Sickick. In the week, it gained 2.3 million streams―which is a 45% gain―and 1,000 paid downloads―gain of 15%. Additionally, the remix peaked at number 5 on Dance/Electronic Digital Song Sales chart. Until May 2022, the song received over 125 million global streams across all streaming platforms, with 8.4 million of them coming from the United States, as of March 2022.

=== Fireboy DML remix ===
On March 1, 2022, Madonna shared a picture of her and Nigerian singer Fireboy DML on her Instagram, announcing new remix. Two days later, aforementioned remix has been released for digital download and streaming through Artist Partner Group and Warner Records. On the same day, both artists teased a music video on Instagram calling each other "fire", whilst Fireboy DML wrote: "Love to the queen for having me on this classic." This rendition starts with Madonna vocals, later featuring new lyrics performed by the featured artist, which talk about heartbreak: "Don't make me waste my time / I've been waiting all my life". He later croons "I thought you loved me / I thought you trusted me / I tried to take care of your heart / but it's frozen." For the outro, the song returns to Madonna's vocals.

"I live in a very musical household and we've lived all over the world. I have a lot of African staff that live in my house. Some are Nigerian, some are from the Congo, some are from Ghana. We were already listening to Afrobeats before it suddenly became super popular, which was just shocking to all of us."

— Madonna talking about Sickick remixes of "Frozen" for Variety.

Writing for Variety, Mike Wass commented that Fireboy DML "laments over Sickick's sweeping trap beats" and takes the song to "soulful direction, plunging deeper into heartbreak territory". George Griffiths of Official Charts Company called the rendition "TikTok friendly" and additionally wrote: "The song morphs from Madonna's ice-cold, electronica-influenced vocals, shifting into something of trap beat for Fireboy DML's verse." Hannah Dailey from Billboard described Firboy DML's vocals as "smooth". Kaufman of the same publication called the rendition "hypnotic". Jenesaispop's Iker Oroz called this remix "insubstantial" while Sebas Alonso writing for the same publication, opined that the performers are lacking chemistry on the track.

The music video for the rendition premiered on Madonna's YouTube channel on March 10, 2022. It was directed by Ricardo Gomes and spans for almost three minutes. During the shooting, Madonna jokingly mentions being drunk and called herself "Merdonna". The first 25 seconds of the clip focus on Madonna's eye and road imagery. When the beat kicks in, a shot of black doberman from the original video appears. Madonna is seen wearing long straight hair, black leather corset with black long sleeves, black short shorts, and black gloves, complemented by Madame X cross jewelry. Multiple shots of her are shown next, taken from different angles, and projecting her smoking among other shots mixed with flashing lights and scenery taken from the original "Frozen" visual. After that, Fireboy DML appears; he is being seen kneeling down next to Madonna's leg and singing his verses in front of background displaying flames. The pair is also dancing with each other. At the end of the clip, Madonna blows her hair in the wind and reaches her arms out. Kenna McCafferty from Paper called the visual "captivating", and said that it presents "the perfect combination of Fire & Ice". Yohann Ruelle of Pure Charts opined that the clip is "hot"; whilst Jenesaispop writers were not keen of the video, describing it as "insubstantial" and "not difficult".

=== 070 Shake remix ===
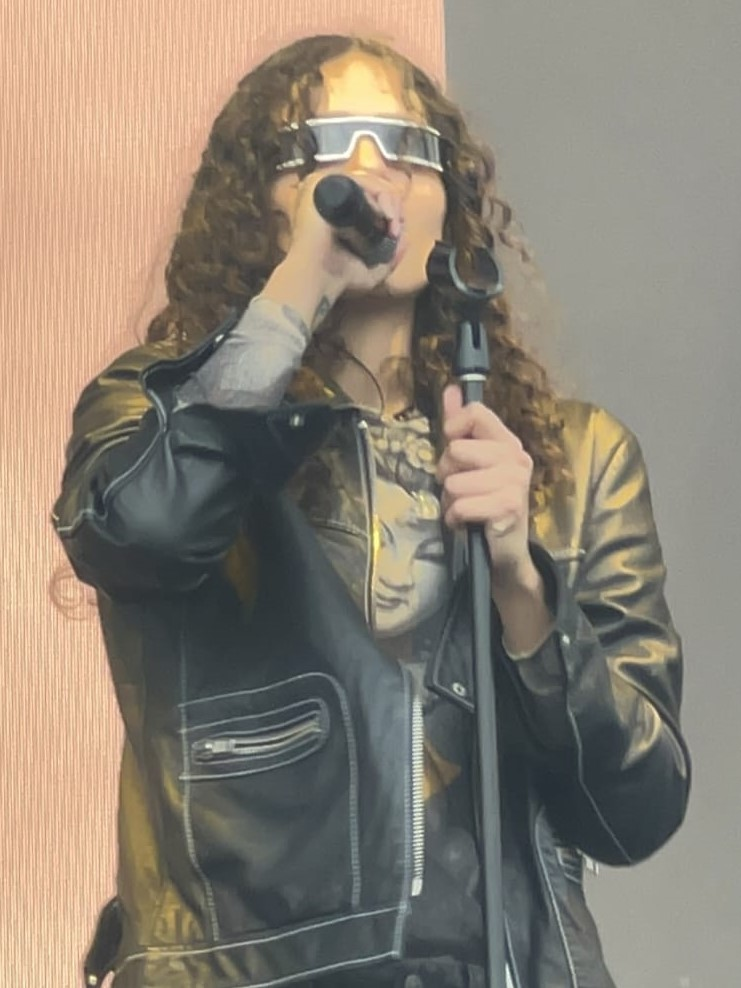
070 Shake is featured on one of the Sickick remixes of "Frozen"

On March 25, 2022, Madonna announced another Sickick remix of "Frozen" through Instagram, this time featuring American rapper and singer 070 Shake. In the post, she called 070 Shake "one of [her] favorite artists". For days, the singer teased the remix, showing off snaps of its music video. This rendition was released six days later, on March 31. Following the remix's release, Madonna posted a statement about the featured artist, saying: "070 Shake is indescribably mysterious and alluring. There are very few women in the trap music world that aren't pandering to men. Her lyrics are deep and unique – there is no one like her. I'm excited for the world to discover her!" In Variety magazine, she wanted to ensure that this remix incorporated LGBTQ representation.

070 Shake's remix of "Frozen" has been described as an "emotional ballad", where she "chant[s] hoarsely over Madonna's quavering coo and Sickick's deep bass rumbles." Jenesaispop reported that the chorus line, "I feel close enough to heaven / To go, to stay, to leave, to pray", might be a reference to Dua Lipa's 2020 song "Levitating", whose the Blessed Madonna remix featured Madonna alongside Missy Elliott. Kat Bouza from Rolling Stone said that this rendition is "haunting" and 070 Shake's delivery is "ethereal". Stereogum's Tom Breithan opined that the featured artist "sounds cool as hell", while the remix itself "sounds like a complete song". Daniela Avila of People labeled the track a "vibey tune". Kaufman called the remix "moody" and "chopped-and-screwed", while 070 Shake's verses have been described as "sleepy eyed".

An accompanying music video was released on the same day as the remix and was directed by Ryan Drake and Ricardo Gomes. Madonna wears a blonde wig, black sunglasses, a leather jacket, and platform boots, while on some shots, her look is complemented by fishnets and a mini dress. The video starts with the singer driving to 070 Shake in the night, which she encounters behind a wired fence. Later, the visual features clips of the performers in "various dark, hypnotic angles", before the video ends with the scene of them driving away together. Breithan suggested that the music video might be video game-inspired. Alonso likens this clip to Madonna's 2001 visual for "What It Feels Like for a Girl", due to the usage of a remix in the video and cars.

=== Frozen on Fire ===
"I didn't actually think of [Sickick] as a singer or a musician or a songwriter or anything. I thought of him as a DJ. So, when it was presented to me that he wanted to do his version, I was kind of skeptical at first. When I ended up going in the studio with him and recording with him, I thought, 'This makes perfect sense to end with him because he started it, the remix,' he has a fantastic voice.

— Madonna, about "Frozen on Fire".

The fourth rendition of Sickick's remix, titled "Frozen on Fire", features vocals by the DJ himself. Madonna re-recorded some of her lines with intention to "remind people that [she] wrote this song." "Frozen on Fire" is reminiscent of the version that Sickick uploaded to his YouTube channel in December 2021, with him having his own verse." When Sickick initially presented that version to Madonna, she was "blown away by his musicianship, by his sense of musicality, by his melody, his singing," and felt the similarity of his voice to the Weeknd.

The first verse of "Frozen on Fire" makes reference to Sickick "popping Molly", a seemingly subtle nod to Madonna's twelfth studio album, MDNA (2012). For this version, the original ending of the second verse was shortened to fit Madonna's vocals. According to D'Souza, this iteration is a trap-pop song evoking pop spirit of the original. He later elaborated that it "is the platonic ideal of a 2022 Madonna update. It’s alien and icy and kind of intoxicating."

"Frozen on Fire" was released on May 19, 2022, for digital download and streaming through Warner Records and Artist Partner Group, whereas the song was sent to Italian radio airplay next day. This version's music video premiered on YouTube on May 19, which is a collective montage of all her three music videos for the song, whilst its lyric video was uploaded five days later.

== Live performances ==
Before the release of Ray of Light, Madonna appeared on several television shows and events to promote the album, and would sometimes perform the song. Madonna first performed "Frozen" on February 21, on BBC 1's The National Lottery Show. Additionally, that same month, she appeared and performed the song at the Sanremo Music Festival 1998 on February 24 and on the German TV show Wetten, dass..?. On April 29, 1998, Madonna made an unannounced appearance at the 9th annual Rainforest Foundation Benefit Concert at New York City's Carnegie Hall, where she performed "Frozen" with the East Harlem Violin Project, while wearing a Versace dress. Jon Pareles from The New York Times felt that during this performance Madonna had "turned herself into America's answer to Björk". Later that occasion, she wore a cowboy hat and joined various artists in a rendition of the Beatles' "With a Little Help from My Friends" and "Twist & Shout".

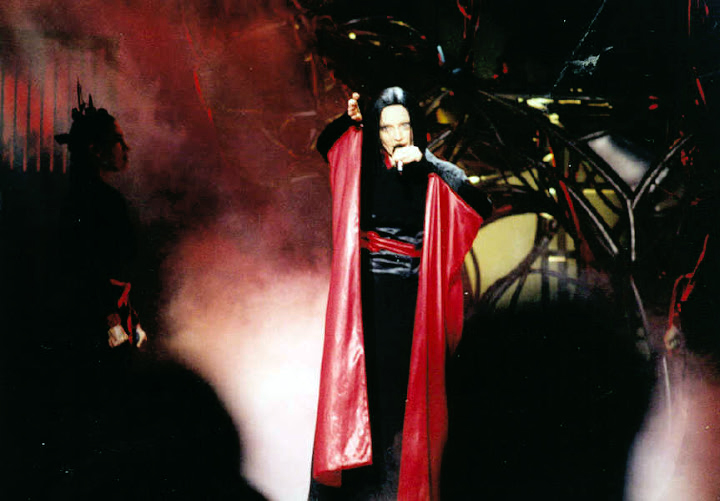
Madonna performing "Frozen" during the Drowned World Tour (2001)

"Frozen" has also been included on four of Madonna's concert tours. For the 2001 Drowned World Tour, "Frozen" was included on the show's second segment known as Geisha–Anime. As the "Paradise (Not for Me)" video interlude ended, Madonna appeared on stage as a kabuki-like figure, wearing a short black wig and dressed in a red and black, hand-painted kimono created by designer Jean-Paul Gaultier, with enormous sleeves creating a span of about fifty feet (4.5 m). As the song progresses, she gradually breaks loose from the sleeves and dances, with synchronized karate moves distributed along all sides of the stage, by herself and with her dancers. A samurai dancer also appeared on a raised platform above her during the performance while the backdrops displayed silhouettes of burning trees against racing, blood-red clouds. MusicOMH praised the performance for "having a recognisable beat unlike the studio recording". The performance of the song on August 26, 2001, at the Palace of Auburn Hills was recorded and released in the live video album, Drowned World Tour 2001.

On the Re-Invention World Tour in 2004, "Frozen" was performed as the last song of the tour's French Baroque–Marie Antoinette Revival opening segment. After an energetic performance of "Nobody Knows Me", Madonna performed the song standing alone on the middle of the stage, wearing a gold jewel-encrusted corset created by designer Christian Lacroix, as the backdrop screens displayed the video of a naked male and a naked female wrestling, caressing and intertwining in water, with their faces and genitals darkened by shadows so as to preserve their androgyny. Sal Sinquemani from Slant Magazine gave the performance a negative review, commenting that Madonna should never do a performance like this.

For the second European leg of Madonna's Sticky & Sweet Tour in 2009, the performance of "Hung Up" was removed from the setlist and was replaced by an up-beat version of "Frozen". This performance was included on the show's fourth and final Rave segment, where it was set between the performances of "Like a Prayer" and "Ray of Light". The video backdrops used for this performance featured outtakes from the song's original music video directed by Chris Cunningham. Madonna sampled DJ Calvin Harris' 2009 single "I'm Not Alone" into the performance. Harris praised the version saying, "I never imagined when I made it in my little purple room in Glasgow in my flat that it would reach far and wide as it has – it's always a privilege." Six years later, on October 1, 2015, Madonna performed an acoustic version of "Frozen" on the Detroit stop of her Rebel Heart Tour. She repeated the performance for the San Jose and San Antonio shows of the tour. On the 2019–20 Madame X Tour, Madonna performed "Frozen" as her daughter Lourdes Leon appeared on screen projections. Chuck Arnold from the New York Post called it the show's highlight. The performance was included on the 2021 live album Madame X: Music from the Theater Xperience.

On January 11, 2024, Madonna added the Sickick remix of the track to the setlist of The Celebration Tour (2023-2024), in replacement of "Rain" (1992); Tom Beedham of Exclaim! opined that the remix "gave Madonna's track more gravitational pull as she sang under the spotlight from the centre of the arena".

== Covers and usage in media ==
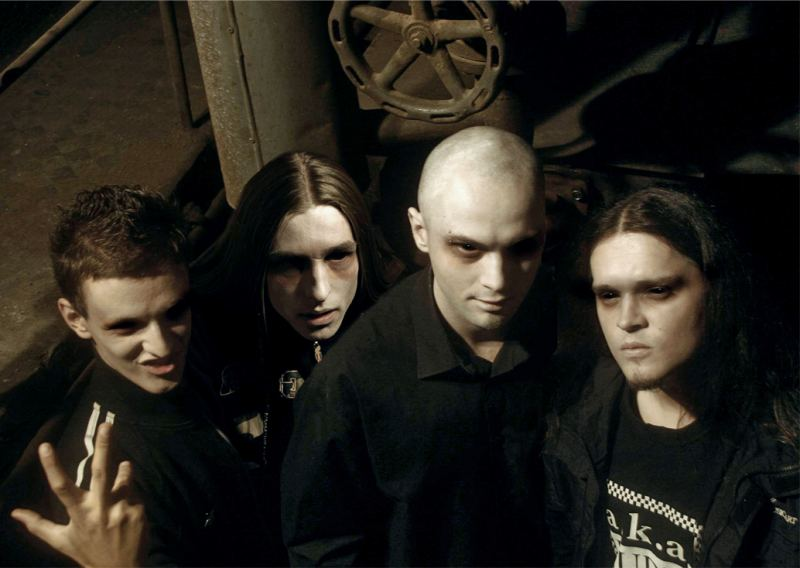
Polish band Thy Disease (pictured) covered the song.

A rock cover was recorded by Jeff Scott Soto with the Talisman band for their 1998 album Truth. A reviewer from Melodic Rock was positive about the version and called it a "moody version with the backing vocals and accompanying keyboards intact." Polish industrial metal band Thy Disease used parts of the original strings and vocals in a cover on their 2001 album, Devilsh Act of Creation. Doom Kounty Electric Chair gave the song a "dark rock" feel with their cover, released in 2004.

Italian rock band Absinth Effect recorded a cover version of "Frozen" for their debut album in 2009. In May 2013, contestant Olympe sang the song on the second season of the French version of The Voice: la plus belle voix, allowing him to reach the show's semi-final. His coach, Jenifer, welcomed the performance warmly. Jérôme Vermelin from Metronews.fr said "Without piano, but in a spectacular setting, the young singer from Amiens shows his pitched voice with disconcerting facility. And his look? The mixture of great and pure sincerity? Although the formula may seem repetitive, it is not difficult to be captivated". Hanane Abdelouahed from TF1 commented that with the rendition, he "has taken the track from the queen of pop".

English singer Jade Thirlwall recorded a cover of "Frozen" as an exclusive for Apple Music in March 2025. The cover charted at number four on the UK Official Singles Downloads and five on the Official Singles Sales charts. It was later included on the deluxe edition of Jade's debut album That's Showbiz Baby in December 2025.

== Plagiarism accusation ==
In November 2005, a Belgian judge in Mons ruled that the opening four-bar theme to "Frozen" was plagiarized from the song "Ma vie fout le camp" ("My Life's Getting Nowhere"), composed by Salvatore Acquaviva. Victor Vicent Dehin, Acquaviva's lawyer, said: "We tried to reach a friendly agreement... but they didn't want to negotiate so I sued for plagiarism. They have stolen a song, so they have to pay the value of the song." No award damages for the song were granted. Acquaviva had explained to the court that the singer heard "Ma vie fout l'camp" during a trip to Mouscron in the late 1970s. She had been recruited to be a dancer on a tour with French singer Patrick Hernandez, whose discs were produced in Mouscron. Dehin also stated that the lawsuit was just the first step, and the next discussion would be about the copyright gains Madonna obtained with "Frozen".

The judge subsequently ordered the withdrawal from sales of all remaining discs of Ray of Light, and forbade any further playing of the song on Belgian TV and radio. Warner Bros., EMI and Sony were also ordered to spread the decision within fifteen days to media outlets on pain of a penalty of €125,000 for non-compliance with the court order. While the case was still going on, Madonna performed "Frozen" during the Sticky & Sweet Tour in Werchter on July 11, 2009. Bert Bieseman, marketing manager of Belgian branch of Warner Bros., stated that "Madonna is not afraid of a more or less riot". Acquaviva responded to the performance: "The court's decision is subject to various interpretations. The song can't be played on the radio or be sold, but have we arguments enough for the concert to be over? We won't bring additional spectacle to the show." The song was later omitted from the track listing on the Belgian pressings of Celebration (2009).

In February 2014, a Belgian court repealed the verdict on the case and proclaimed that Madonna did not plagiarize Acquaviva's work. The court spoke of a "new capital offense" in the file: composer Edouard Scotto Di Suoccio and societies Tabata Atoll Music and Music in Paris had also filed a complaint for plagiarism. According to them, both "Ma vie fout le camp" and "Frozen" originated in the song "Blood Night" which they composed in 1983. After all three tracks in the case were compared, the final ruling was that the songs were "not sufficiently 'original' to claim" that any plagiarism had taken place. This ruling ended the eight-year ban of the song in place in Belgium since 2005.

== Formats and track listings ==
- UK and US 7-inch vinyl; Australian, UK and US cassette; Canadian, European, Japanese and US 2-track CD single
1. "Frozen" – 6:11
2. "Shanti / Ashtangi" – 4:29
- US 12-inch vinyl; Canadian and US CD maxi-single
1. "Frozen" – 6:11
2. "Frozen" (Stereo MC's Remix) – 5:46
3. "Frozen" (Extended Club Mix) – 11:17
4. "Frozen" (Meltdown Mix) – 8:10
- Australian, European, Japanese, Mexican, South African and UK CD maxi-single
1. "Frozen" – 6:11
2. "Frozen" (Stereo MC's Remix) – 5:46
3. "Frozen" (Meltdown Mix) – 8:10
4. "Frozen" (Extended Club Mix) – 11:17
5. "Frozen" (Widescreen Mix) – 6:33
- European and UK 12-inch vinyl
1. "Frozen" (Extended Club Mix) – 11:17
2. "Frozen" (Stereo MC's Remix) – 5:46
3. "Frozen" (Meltdown Mix) – 8:10
- Digital bundle (2021)
1. "Frozen" – 6:11
2. "Frozen" (Stereo MC's Remix) – 5:46
3. "Frozen" (Extended Club Mix) – 11:17
4. "Frozen" (Meltdown Mix) – 8:10
5. "Frozen" (Widescreen Mix) – 6:33
6. "Frozen" (Edit) – 5:08
7. "Frozen" (Stereo MC's Remix Edit) – 4:53
8. "Frozen" (Extended Club Mix Edit) – 4:37
9. "Frozen" (William Orbit Drumapella) – 5:15
10. "Frozen" (Victor Calderone Drumapella) – 5:10
- Digital single – Sickick Remix
1. "Frozen" (Sickick Remix) – 2:00
- Digital single – Sickick & Fireboy DML Remix
1. "Frozen" (Sickick & Fireboy DML Remix) – 2:13
- Digital single – Sickick & 070 Shake Remix
1. "Frozen" (Sickick & 070 Shake Remix) – 2:19
- Digital single – "Frozen on Fire"
1. "Frozen on Fire" – 3:12

== Credits and personnel ==
Credits and personnel are adapted from the Ray of Light album liner notes.

- Madonna – songwriter, producer
- Patrick Leonard – songwriter, producer, remixer, arranger
- William Orbit – producer
- Marius de Vries – keyboard, programming
- Craig Armstrong – string arrangement

== Charts ==
=== Weekly charts ===
1998 weekly chart performance for "Frozen"
| Chart (1998) | Peak position |
|---|---|
| Australia (ARIA) | 5 |
| Austria (Ö3 Austria Top 40) | 2 |
| Belgium (Ultratop 50 Flanders) | 3 |
| Belgium (Ultratop 50 Wallonia) | 2 |
| Brazil (Nopem/ABPD) | 3 |
| Canada (Nielsen SoundScan) | 2 |
| Canada Top Singles (RPM) | 2 |
| Canada Adult Contemporary (RPM) | 3 |
| Canada Contemporary Hit Radio (BDS) | 1 |
| Canada Dance/Urban (RPM) Remix | 17 |
| Costa Rica (UPI) | 1 |
| Denmark (IFPI) | 4 |
| Europe (European Hot 100 Singles) | 2 |
| Finland (Suomen virallinen lista) | 1 |
| France (SNEP) | 2 |
| France Airplay (SNEP) | 1 |
| Germany (GfK) | 2 |
| Greece (IFPI) | 1 |
| Honduras (UPI) | 1 |
| Hungary (MAHASZ) | 1 |
| Hungary (Rádiós Top 40) | 1 |
| Iceland (Íslenski Listinn Topp 40) | 11 |
| Ireland (IRMA) | 4 |
| Italy (FIMI) | 1 |
| Italy Airplay (Music & Media) | 1 |
| Netherlands (Dutch Top 40) | 2 |
| Netherlands (Single Top 100) | 2 |
| New Zealand (Recorded Music NZ) | 5 |
| Norway (VG-lista) | 2 |
| Poland Airplay (Music & Media) | 2 |
| Scottish Singles Sales (Official Charts) | 1 |
| Spain (AFYVE) | 1 |
| Sweden (Sverigetopplistan) | 2 |
| Switzerland (Schweizer Hitparade) | 2 |
| Taiwan (IFPI) | 2 |
| UK Singles (Official Charts) | 1 |
| UK Dance (Official Charts) | 3 |
| US Billboard Hot 100 | 2 |
| US Adult Contemporary (Billboard) | 8 |
| US Adult Pop Airplay (Billboard) | 9 |
| US Dance Club Songs (Billboard) | 1 |
| US Dance Singles Sales (Billboard) | 2 |
| US Pop Airplay (Billboard) | 4 |
| US Rhythmic Airplay (Billboard) | 15 |

2020 weekly chart performance for "Frozen"
| Chart (2020) | Peak position |
|---|---|
| Ukraine Airplay (TopHit) S.One Remix | 39 |

2022 weekly chart performance for "Frozen"
| Chart (2022) | Peak position |
|---|---|
| UK Singles Downloads | 41 |

2021–2022 weekly chart performance for "Frozen (Sickick Remix)"
| Chart (2021–2022) | Peak position |
|---|---|
| CIS Airplay (TopHit) | 145 |
| France (SNEP) | 64 |
| Sweden Heatseeker (Sverigetopplistan) | 8 |
| UK Singles Downloads (Official Charts) | 39 |
| UK Singles Sales Chart (OCC) | 42 |
| US Hot Dance/Electronic Songs (Billboard) | 10 |

=== Year-end charts ===
Year-end chart performance for "Frozen"
| Chart (1998) | Position |
|---|---|
| Australia (ARIA) | 44 |
| Austria (Ö3 Austria Top 40) | 15 |
| Belgium (Ultratop 50 Flanders) | 18 |
| Belgium (Ultratop 50 Wallonia) | 15 |
| Brazil (Crowley) | 83 |
| Canada Top Singles (RPM) | 15 |
| Canada Adult Contemporary (RPM) | 12 |
| Europe (European Hot 100 Singles) | 5 |
| France (SNEP) | 15 |
| Germany (Media Control) | 12 |
| Iceland (Íslenski Listinn Topp 40) | 54 |
| Netherlands (Dutch Top 40) | 16 |
| Netherlands (Single Top 100) | 14 |
| Norway Spring Period (VG-lista) | 8 |
| Norway Winter Period (VG-lista) | 6 |
| Spain (AFYVE) | 6 |
| Sweden (Hitlistan) | 26 |
| Switzerland (Schweizer Hitparade) | 6 |
| Taiwan (Hito Radio) | 25 |
| UK Singles (OCC) | 22 |
| US Billboard Hot 100 | 32 |
| US Adult Contemporary (Billboard) | 26 |
| US Adult Top 40 (Billboard) | 43 |
| US Dance Club Play (Billboard) | 5 |
| US Mainstream Top 40 (Billboard) | 37 |
| US Maxi-Singles Sales (Billboard) | 8 |
| US Rhythmic Top 40 (Billboard) | 76 |

Year-end chart performance for "Frozen (Sickick Remix)"
| Chart (2022) | Position |
|---|---|
| US Hot Dance/Electronic Songs (Billboard) | 33 |

== Certifications and sales ==
Certifications and sales for "Frozen"
| Region | Certification | Certified units/sales |
|---|---|---|
| Australia (ARIA) | Gold | 35,000^{^} |
| Austria (IFPI Austria) | Gold | 25,000^{*} |
| Belgium (BRMA) | Platinum | 50,000^{*} |
| France (SNEP) | Gold | 250,000^{*} |
| Germany (BVMI) | Platinum | 500,000^{^} |
| Italy | — | 30,000 (Note: Pre-ordered copies only.) |
| Italy (FIMI) sales since 2009 | Gold | 50,000^{‡} |
| Netherlands (NVPI) | Gold | 50,000^{^} |
| Norway (IFPI Norway) | Platinum | |
| Sweden (GLF) | Gold | 15,000^{^} |
| Switzerland (IFPI Switzerland) | Gold | 25,000^{^} |
| United Kingdom (BPI) | Platinum | 602,200 |
| United States (RIAA) | Gold | 600,000 |
^{*} Sales figures based on certification alone.^{^} Shipments figures based on certification alone.^{‡} Sales+streaming figures based on certification alone.

Certifications and sales for "Frozen" (Sickick Remix)
| Region | Certification | Certified units/sales |
|---|---|---|
| France (SNEP) | Gold | 100,000^{‡} |
| New Zealand (RMNZ) | Gold | 15,000^{‡} |
| Poland (ZPAV) | Platinum | 50,000^{‡} |
^{‡} Sales+streaming figures based on certification alone.

== Release history ==
Release dates, formats and versions for "Frozen"
| Region | Date | Format(s) | Version | Label(s) | Ref. |
|---|---|---|---|---|---|
| Europe | January 23, 1998 | Radio airplay | Original | Maverick; Warner | |
| United States | February 19, 1998 | Radio airplay | Original | Maverick; Warner | |
| United States | February 20, 1998 | Hot adult contemporary radio | Original | Maverick; Warner | |
| Japan | February 22, 1998 | CD | Original | Maverick; Warner | |
| United Kingdom | February 23, 1998 | 12-inch vinyl; CD; cassette | Original | Maverick; Warner | |
| United States | February 24, 1998 | Contemporary hit radio; rhythmic contemporary radio | Original | Maverick; Warner | |
| United States | February 27, 1998 | Adult contemporary radio | Original | Maverick; Warner | |
| United States | March 3, 1998 | 7-inch vinyl; 12-inch vinyl; CD; CD maxi; cassette | Original | Maverick; Warner | |
| Canada | March 24, 1998 | CD | Original | Maverick; Warner | |
| Various | March 12, 2021 | Digital download; streaming | EP | Warner | |
| Various | December 3, 2021 | Digital download; streaming | Sickick remix | APG; Warner | |
| Italy | January 24, 2022 | Radio airplay | Sickick remix | Warner | |
| Various | March 3, 2022 | Digital download; streaming | Fireboy DML remix | APG; Warner | |
| Various | March 31, 2022 | Digital download; streaming | 070 Shake remix | APG; Warner | |
| Various | May 19, 2022 | Digital download; streaming | "Frozen on Fire" | APG; Warner | |
| Italy | May 20, 2022 | Radio airplay | "Frozen on Fire" | APG; Warner | |

== See also ==
- Billboard Year-End Hot 100 singles of 1998
- French Top 100 singles of the 1990s
- List of Billboard Hot 100 top 10 singles in 1998
- List of European number-one airplay songs of the 1990s
- List of UK Singles Chart number ones of the 1990s
- List of number-one dance singles of 1998 (U.S.)
- List of number-one hits of 1998 (Italy)
- List of number-one singles of 1998 (Finland)
- List of number-one singles of 1998 (Spain)

== Bibliography ==
- Fouz-Hernández, Santiago; Jarman-Ivens, Freya (2004). Madonna's Drowned Worlds. Ashgate Publishing, Ltd. ISBN 0-7546-3372-1.
- Groß, Matthias (2008). 'Madonna On the Couch': A psychoanalytic view on Madonna's music videos. GRIN Verlag. ISBN 978-3-640-10459-8.
- Guilbert, Georges-Claude (2002). Madonna As Postmodern Myth. McFarland. ISBN 0-7864-1408-1.
- Keazor, Henry; Wübbena, Thorsten (2010). Rewind, Play, Fast Forward: The Past, Present and Future of the Music Video. Transcript Verlag. ISBN 978-3-8376-1185-4.
- Metz, Allen; Benson, Carol (1999). The Madonna Companion: Two Decades of Commentary. Music Sales Group. ISBN 0-8256-7194-9.
- O'Brien, Lucy (2008). Madonna: Like an Icon. Bantam Press. ISBN 978-0-552-15361-4.
- Rooksby, Rikky (2004). The Complete Guide to the Music of Madonna. Omnibus Press. ISBN 0-7119-9883-3.
- Salaverri, Fernando (2005). Sólo éxitos: año a año, 1959–2002. Spain: Fundación Autor-SGAE. ISBN 84-8048-639-2.
- Vorrath, Armin (2011). Eine außersinnliche Odyssee zu Madonna [An Extraordinary Odyssey to Madonna]. Books on Demand. ISBN 978-3-8423-8112-4.
