= 1970s in Latin music =

- 1960s ^{.} 1970s in Latin music ^{.} 1980s

This article includes an overview of the major events and trends in Latin music in the 1970s, namely in Ibero-America (including Spain and Portugal). This includes recordings, festivals, award ceremonies, births and deaths of Latin music artists, and the rise and fall of various subgenres in Latin music from 1970 to 1979.

== Overview ==
By 1975, music market analysts predicted an 8 to 10% growth of Latin music internationally. This growth also expanded into the United States which led to record labels of promoting Latin artists in the country. According to Billboard's Marv Fisher, " international labels are increasingly involved throughout Latin America".

=== Latin pop ===
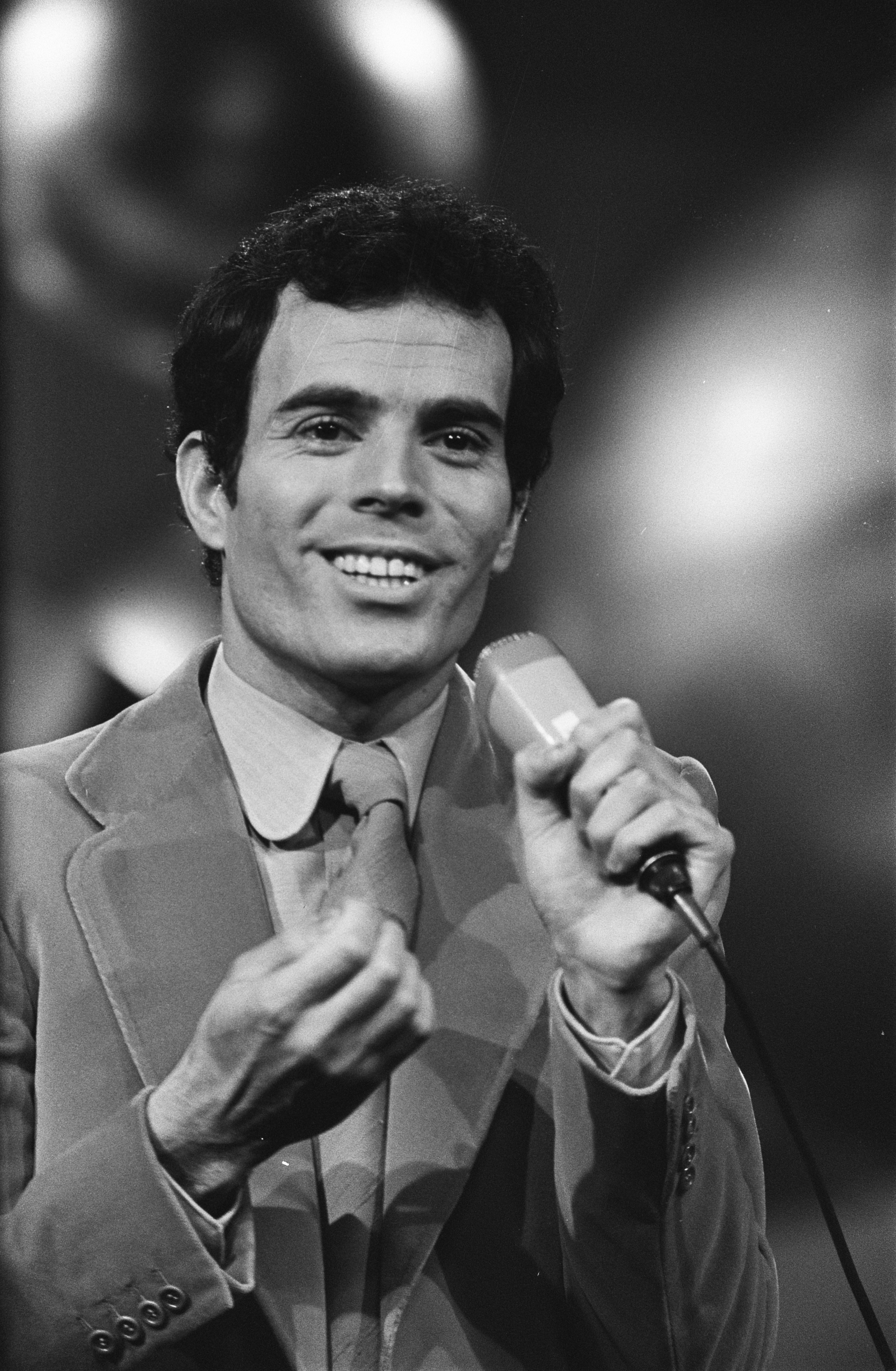
Spanish singer Julio Iglesias was among the pioneers of the balada craze of the 1970s. He would eventually be recognized as the best selling male Latin artist of all time by the Guinness World Record in 2013.

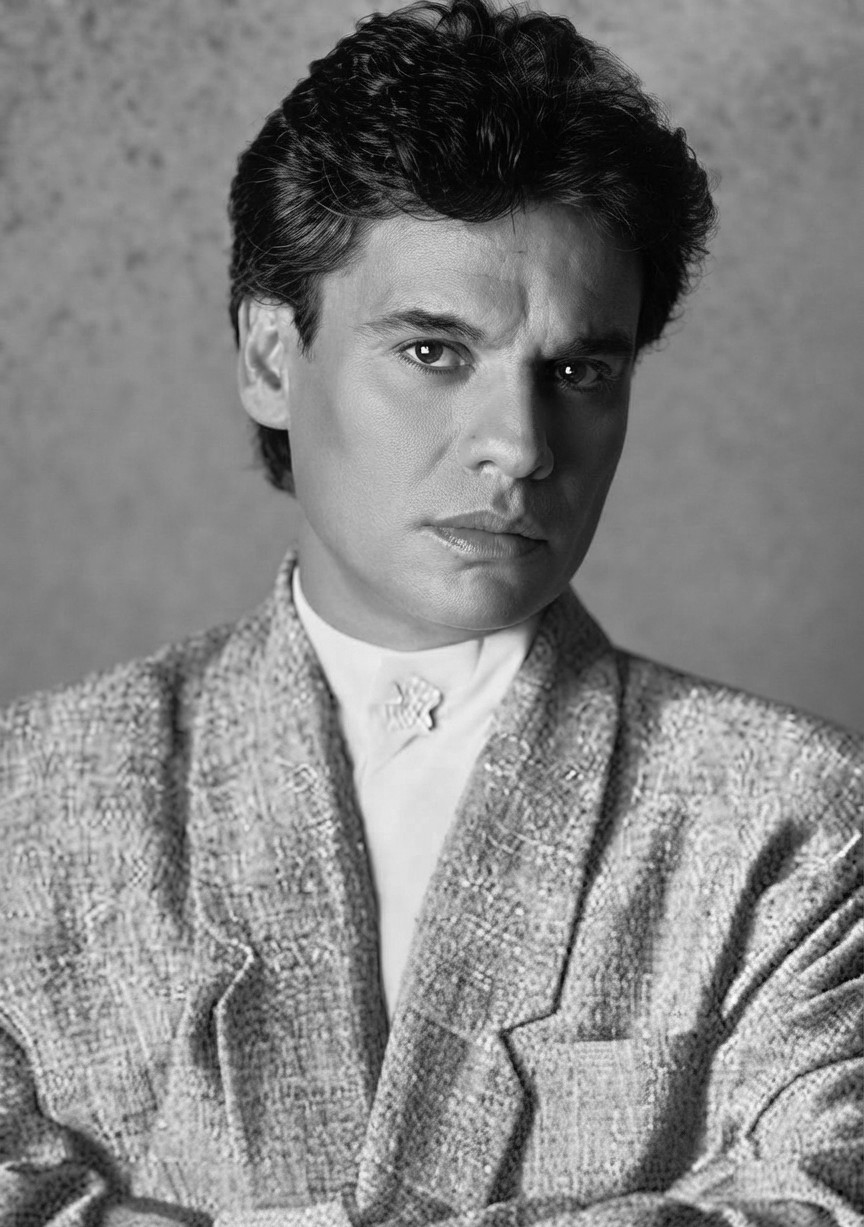
Mexican singer-songwriter Juan Gabriel was one of the most prolific singers of the balada genre during the 1970s.

Latin America went through the balada craze with balladeers from both the region and Spain having a huge Latin audience. Artists include José José, Roberto Carlos, Juan Gabriel, and Julio Iglesias. The latter artist would later become the best-selling male Latin artist of all time.

=== Regional Mexican ===
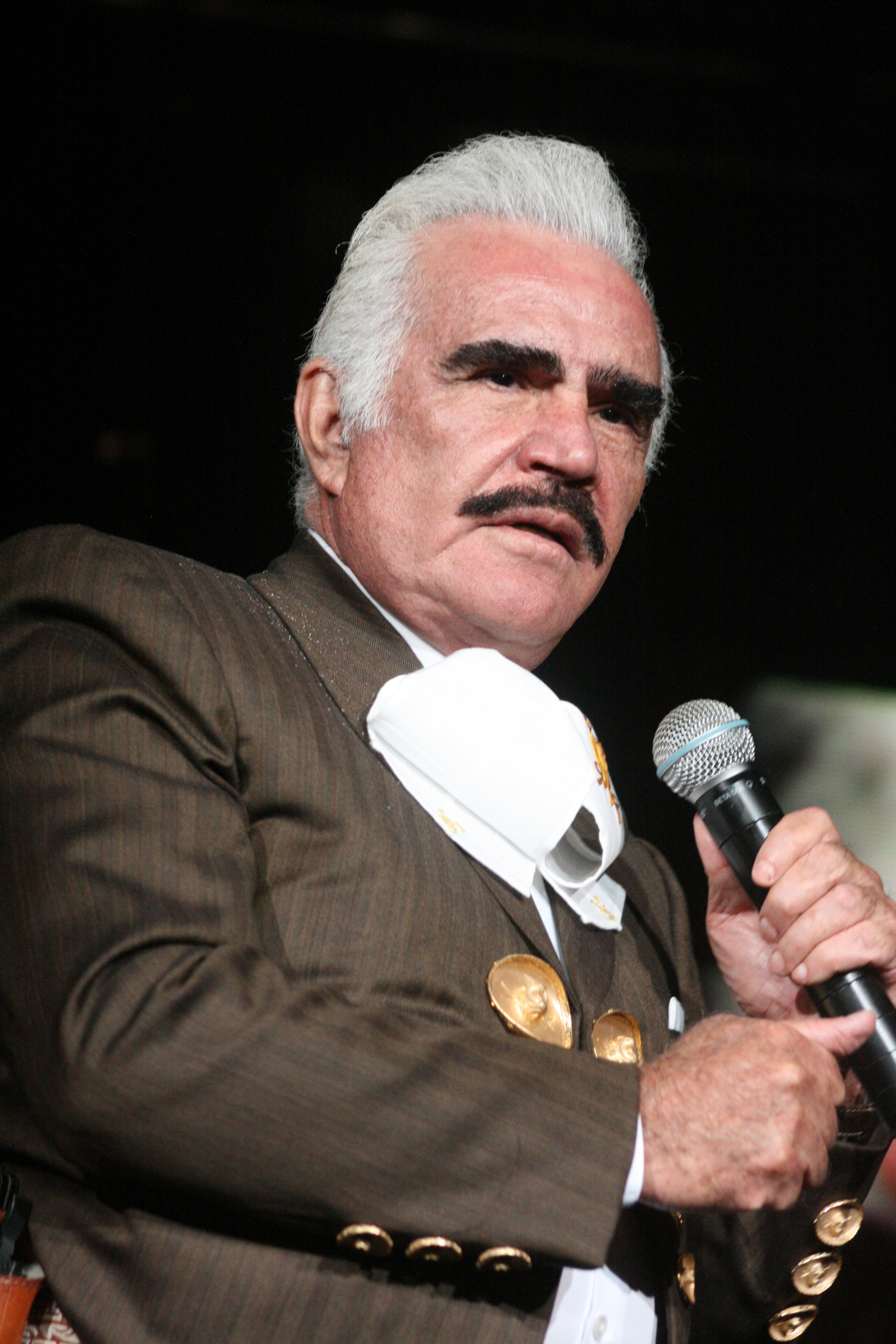
Vicente Fernández was the most popular ranchera singer during the 1970s.

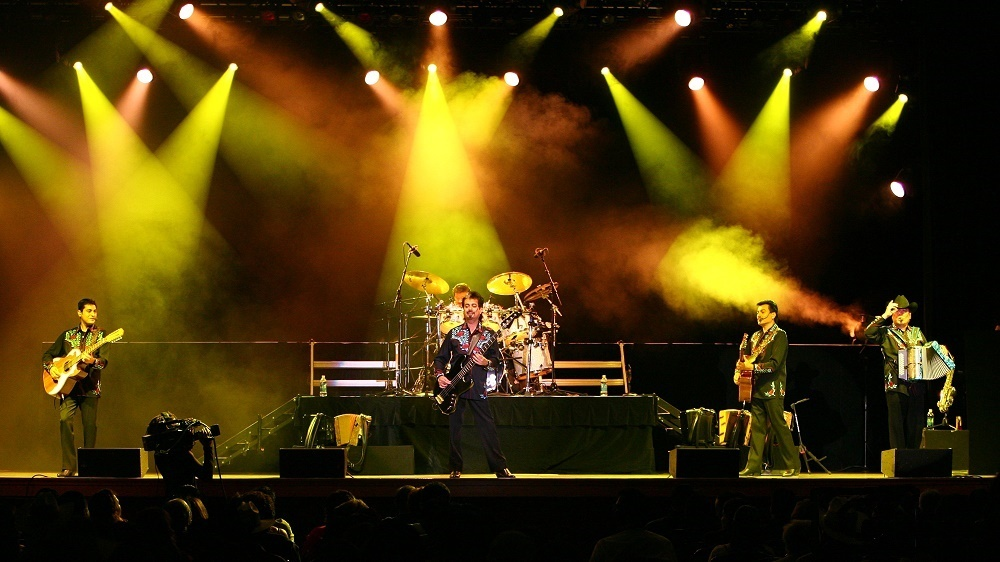
Norteño group Los Tigres del Norte became well-known for their social commentary tracks.

Mariachi music in 1970s, while still popular in the Regional Mexican music field, was named "the last great decade for mariachi music" according to the Los Angeles Times critic Augustin Gurza. The Mexican farmworkers movement since the 1960s led to the popularity corridos which dealt with their impoverished lives. Most notably, norteño group Los Tigres del Norte emerged having performed songs that deal with social commentary. Another emerging genre in the Regional Mexican field was Tejano. Rigo Tovar modernized the Mexican style of cumbia by combining it with rock including utilizing an electric guitar and a synthesizer.

=== Tropical/salsa ===
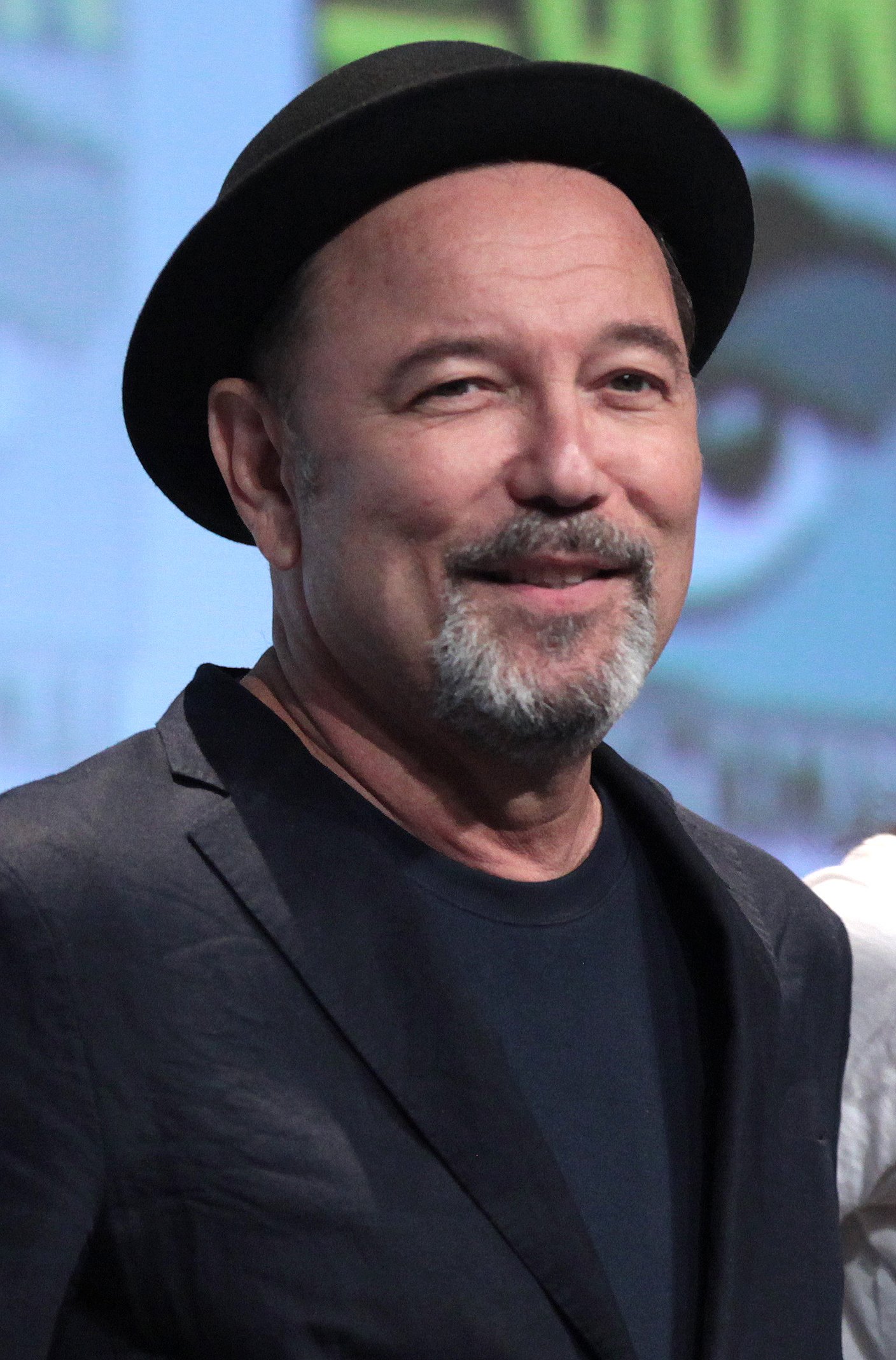
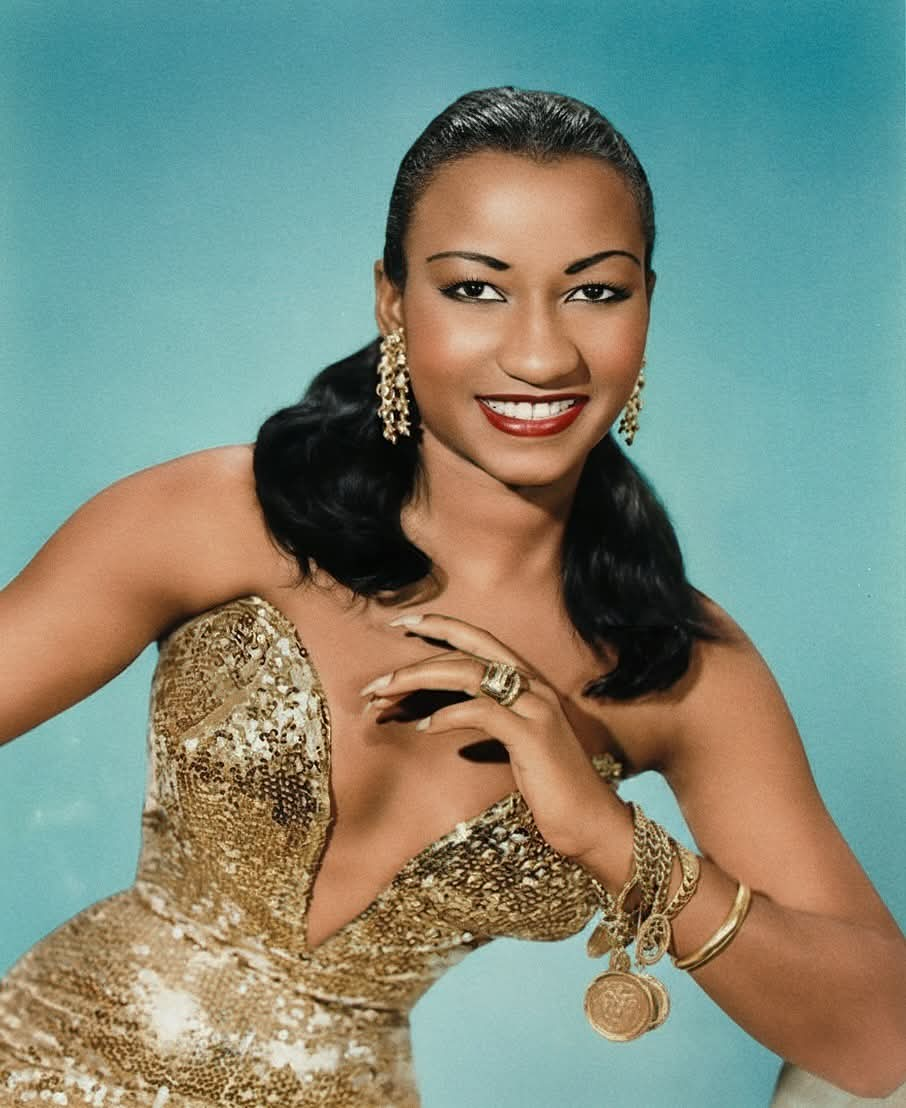
Rubén Blades (left) and Celia Cruz (right) were instrumental in popularizing the salsa music genre.

Salsa music was the dominant genre in the tropical field in the 1970s. Fania Records was the prime record label for popularizing and defining salsa music with artists such as Celia Cruz, Rubén Blades, Héctor Lavoe, and Willie Colón. The Colombian vallenato remains popular in the country with artists such as Diomedes Diaz. Likewise, the country's cumbia expanded its popularity outside of country into other Latin American nations including Mexico. Like its Mexican counterpart, the Colombia cumbia saw changes in the genre with the use of a bass guitar, organ, and less emphasis on brass instruments.

=== Nueva canción ===
During the 1970s in Latin America, the 1960s music influence remained strong and two styles developed from it one that followed the European and North American trends and Nueva Canción that focused on the renewal of folklore including Andean music and cueca. Some bands such as Los Jaivas from Chile mixed both streams and created a syncretism between folklore and progressive rock. The Nueva Canción movement got an even more marked protest association after all countries in the Southern Cone became (or were already) military dictatorships in the 1970s. In Chile, the Nueva canción styles developed through the 1970s would remain popular until the return to democracy in 1990.

=== Laitn rock/rock en español ===
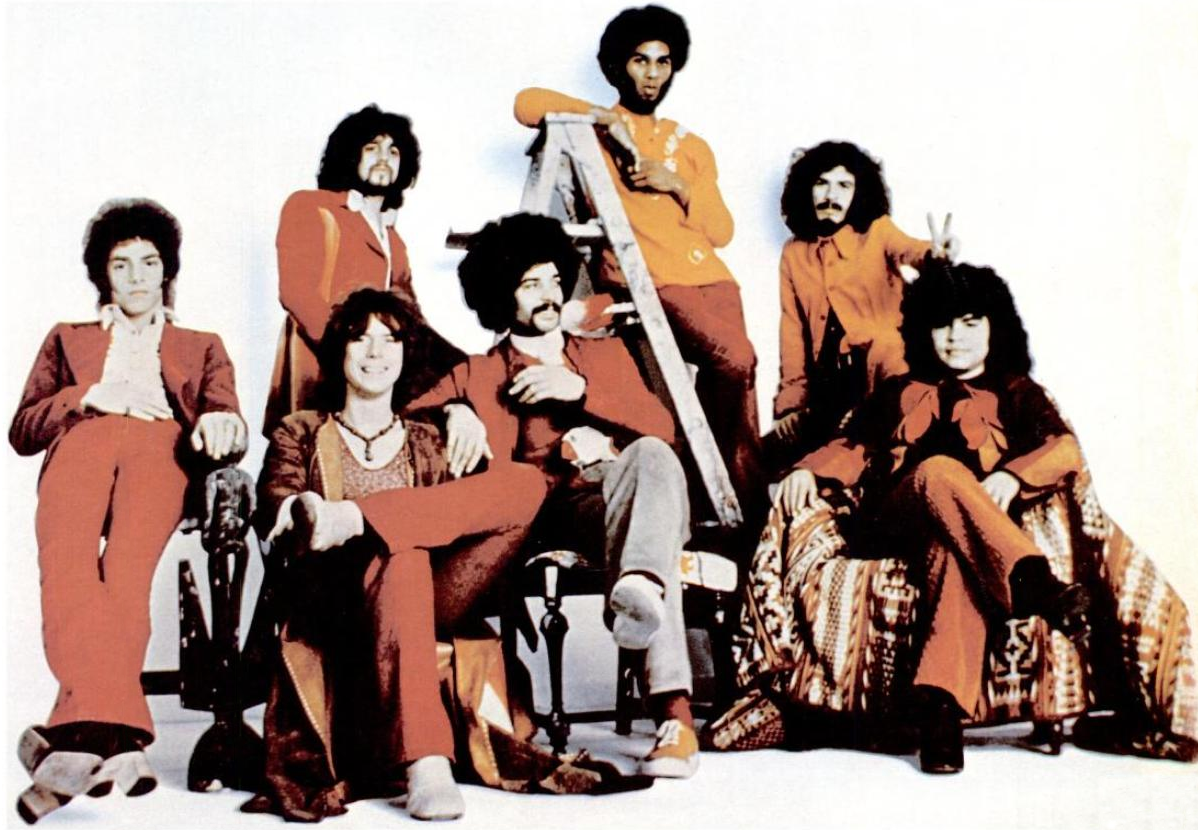
Santana pioneered the Latin rock movement.

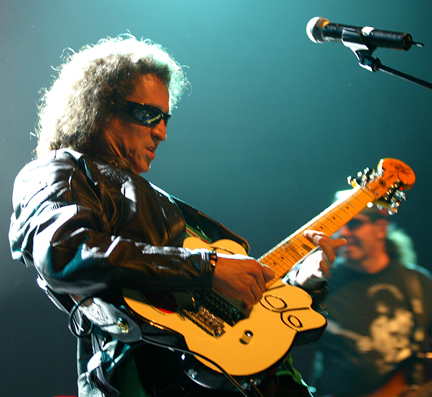
El Tri Band founder Alex Lora, on stage with the band in 2006 genre during the 1970s.

In the 1970s, rock en Español began to emerge (especially in Argentina), and as imitation bands became fewer, rock music started to develop more independently from the outside, although many rock bands still preferred to sing in English. The Argentine defeat in the Falklands War in 1982 followed by the fall of the military junta that year diminished need of Nueva Canción as protest music there in favour of other styles. Santana and Malo pioneered the Latin rock movement by mixing rock music with Afro-Latino Caribbean music.

=== Brazilian/Portuguese ===
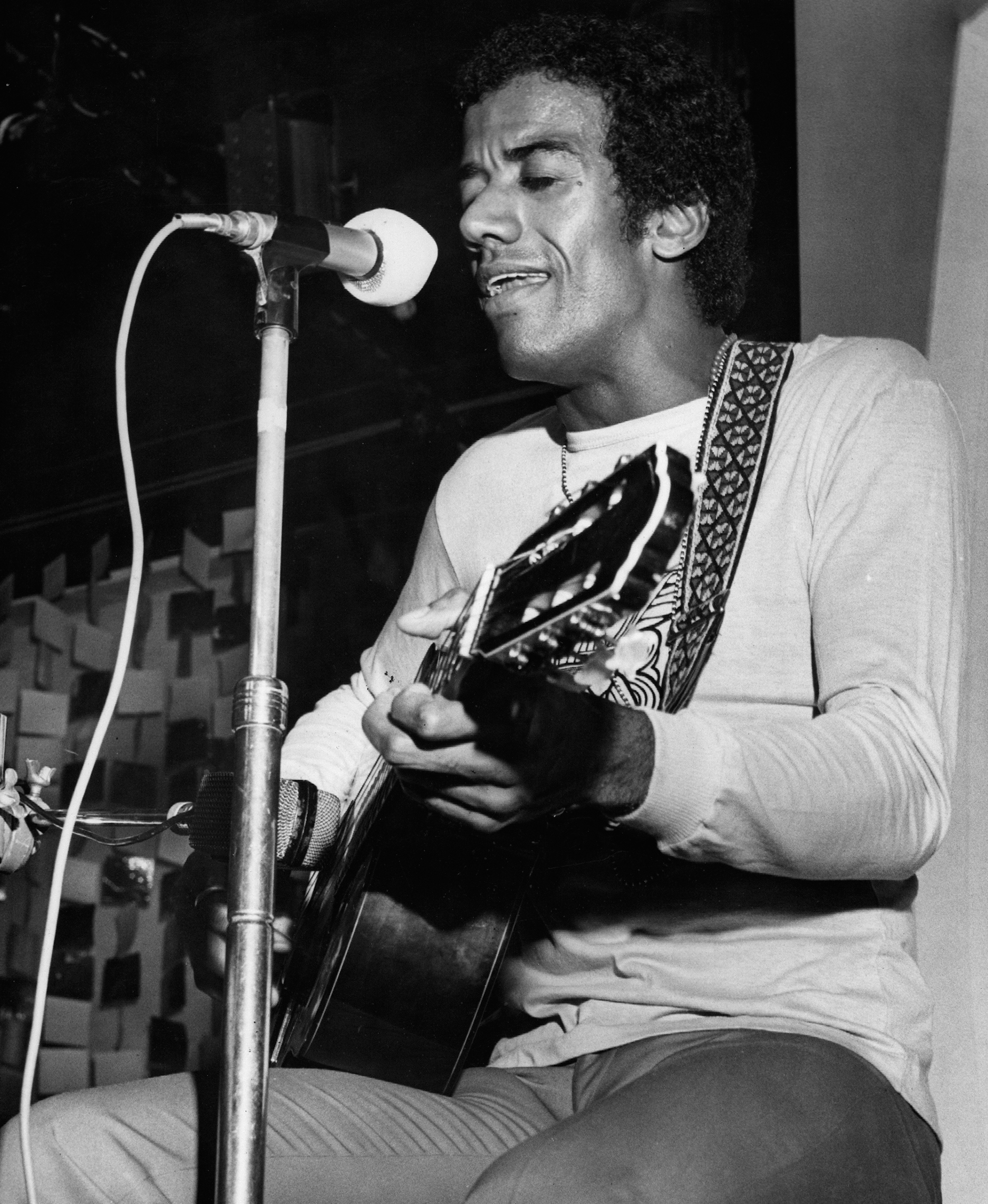
Jorge Ben was a fundamental figure in establishing the samba rock genre.

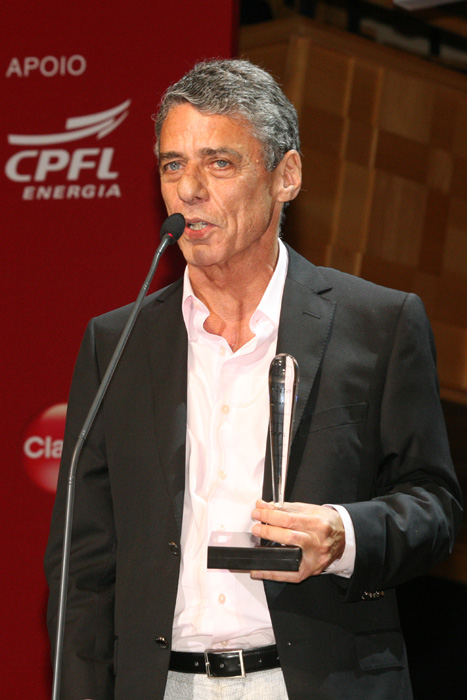
Chico Buarque was one of the key musicians of the Música popular brasileira genre

Jorge Ben's Fôrça Bruta's fusion of Trio Mocotó's groove and Ben's more rockish guitar proved to be a distinctive feature of what critics and musicians later called samba rock. The 1970s also saw the rise of Música popular brasileira, a form of protest songs against the Brazilian military dictatorship. Among the key musicians in the genre was Chico Buarque who was exiled from the country.

== 1970 ==
=== Events ===
- March 10-14 – Cláudya, representing Brazil, wins the second and final Festival Mundial de la Canción Latina with her song "Canção de amor e paz".

=== Album releases ===
- Emmanuel: Entre Lunas
- Los Ángeles Negros: Y Volveré
- Freddie Martinez: Te Traigo Estas Flores
- Los Unicos: Los Unicos
- Willie Colón, Héctor Lavoe and Yomo Toro: Asalto Navideño
- Johnny Ventura y Su Combo: El Guataco
- Nino Bravo: Nino Bravo
- Pedro Miguel Y Sus Maracaibos: Con Sabor A Cuba
- Santana: Abraxas
- Jorge Ben: Fôrça Bruta
- Os Mutantes: A Divina Comédia ou Ando Meio Desligado
- Tim Maia: Tim Maia
- João Donato: A Bad Donato
- José José: El Triste
- José José: La Nave del Olvido
- Mari Trini: Amores
- Quilapayún: Cantata de Santa María de Iquique
- Facundo Cabral: Facundo Cabral
- Eddie Palmieri: Superimposition
- Vinicius de Moraes, Maria Creuza, and Toquinho: La Fusa
- Paulinho da Viola: Foi um Rio Que Passou em Minha Vida
- Som Imaginário: Som Imaginário
- Ronnie Von: A Máquina Voadora
- Novos Baianos: É Ferro na Boneca
- O Terço: O Terço
- Egberto Gismonti: Sonho 70
- Rita Lee: Build Up
- Elis Regina: ...Em Pleno Verão
- Roberto Carlos: Roberto Carlos
- Gal Costa: Legal
- Lucha Reyes: La Morena de Oro del Perú
- Manal: Manal
- Moris: Treinta minutos de vida
- Judith Reyes: Crónica mexicana
- Flor Pucarina: Corazón de piedra
- Guillermo Portabales with Los Guaracheros del Oriente: Sones cubanos
- Fruko y sus Tesos: Tesura

=== Births ===
- April 19 – Luis Miguel, Mexican pop singer
- November 24 – Julieta Venegas, Mexican alternative singer

== 1971 ==
=== Album releases ===
- Joan Manuel Serrat: Mediterráneo
- Roberto Carlos: Roberto Carlos (1972)/Detalles
- Willie Colón: La Gran Fuga
- Cheo Feliciano: Cheo
- Raphy Leavitt: Payaso
- Cornelio Reyna: Cornelio Reyna
- El Gran Combo de Puerto Rico: De Punta a Punta
- Raphael: Algo Más...
- Juan Gabriel: El Alma Joven...
- Nelson Ned: Si Las Flores Pudieran Hablar
- Ray Barretto: The Message
- Raphael: Le Llaman Jesus
- Vikki Carr: Que Sea El
- Orchestra Harlow: Tribute To Arsenio Rodriguez
- Los Golpes: Olvidarte Nunca
- Nino Bravo: Nino Bravo
- Formula V: Formula V
- Ralfi Pagan: With Love / Con Amor
- Roberto Carlos: Roberto Carlos (1971)
- La Sonora Ponceña: Navidad Criolla
- Chico Buarque: Construção
- Gal Costa: -Fa-Tal- Gal a Todo Vapor
- Erasmo Carlos: Carlos, Erasmo...
- Os Mutantes: Jardim Elétrico
- Tim Maia: Tim Maia
- José José: Buscando Una Sonrisa
- Mari Trini: Escúchame
- Víctor Jara: El derecho de vivir en paz
- Ismael Miranda with Orquesta Harlow: Abran paso
- Richie Ray & Bobby Cruz: El bestial sonido de Ricardo Ray y Bobby Cruz
- Aníbal Troilo and Roberto Goyeneche: Te acordás... Polaco
- Inti-Illimani: Autores chilenos
- Nicomedes Santa Cruz: Los reyes del festejo
- Guadalupe Trigo: Guadalupe Trigo
- Dom Salvador and Abolição: Som, Sangue e Raça
- Raul Seixas, Sérgio Sampaio, Miriam Batucada, and Edy Star: Sociedade da Grã-Ordem Kavernista Apresenta Sessão das 10
- Marcos Valle: Garra
- Antônio Carlos Jobim: Stone Flower
- Rosinha de Valença: Um Violão em Primeiro Plano
- Antônio Carlos & Jocáfi: Mudei de Ideia
- Cassiano: Imagem e Som
- Tony Tornado: Toni Tornado
- Caetano Veloso: Caetano Veloso
- Paulinho da Viola: Paulinho da Viola 1
- Paulinho da Viola: Paulinho da Viola 2
- Banda del Sol, Corimbo, Fiebre Amarilla, Jorge Delgadillo, and Kiriaps y Rolf: Unidad
- Vox Dei: La Biblia
- Grupo De Experimentación Sonora Del ICAIC: Cuba Va!
- La Revolución de Emiliano Zapata: La Revolución de Emiliano Zapata
- José Alfredo Jiménez: El Cantinero
- Aparcoa and Pablo Neruda:Canto General
- Jorge López Ruiz: Bronca Buenos Aires

=== Births ===
- March 9 – Diego Torres, Argentine pop singer
- April 16 – Selena, American Tejano singer (d. 1995)
- April 24 – Alejandro Fernández, Mexican ranchera and pop singer
- June 17 – Paulina Rubio, Mexican pop singer
- July 5 – Descemer Bueno, Cuban singer-songwriter
- July 30 – Elvis Crespo, Puerto Rican merengue singer
- August 26 – Thalía, Mexican pop singer
- November 25 – Tommy Torres, Puerto Rican pop singer
- December 24 – Ricky Martin, Puerto Rican pop singer
- December 31 – Claudio Bermúdez, Mexican pop singer

== 1972 ==
=== Events ===
- November 11 – Billboard magazine announces a new section on its printed magazines titled "Latin Music Spotlight" (later known as "Latin Notas"), which covers three pages of Latin music-related news
- November 24 – The 1st OTI Festival, held at the Palacio de Exposiciones y Congresos, in Madrid, Spain, is won by the song "Diálogo", written by Paulo César Pinheiro and Baden Powell, and performed by Tobias and Claudia Regina representing Brazil.
- December 9 – The first Latin albums chart are compiled by Billboard, under the title the Hot Latin LP's, which surveys sales of Latin LP's in selected regions in the United States including Los Angeles, Chicago, Miami, New York, and Texas.

=== Album releases ===
- Vikki Carr: En Español
- Lucha Villa: Puro Norte, Vol. 2
- Los Muecos: Que Ironía
- Gerardo Reyes: Gerardo Reyes
- Victor Yturbe: Condición
- Los Diablos: Vol. III
- Estela Nuñez: Estela Nuñez Con Mariachi
- Cornelio Reyna: Aqui Está Otra Vez el Amo y Señor de la Canción Norteña
- Carmela y Rafael: Remite
- Los Freddy's: Con Tu Adiós
- Malo: Dos
- Victor Yturbe: Noches En La Posada Vallarta
- Vicente Fernández: ¡Arriba Huentitàn!
- Fania All-Stars: Our Latin Thing
- Fania All-Stars: Live at the Cheetah, Vol. II
- Roberto Sasian: Mariachi con Organo
- Los Blue Angels: Espera
- Los Baby's: ¿Por Qué?
- El Gran Combo de Puerto Rico: Por el Libro
- Willie Colón and Héctor Lavoe: El Juicio
- Ray Barretto: Que Viva la Música
- Rodolfo Aicardi: Sufrir
- José Miguel Class: El Ausente
- Ramón Ayala: Hits 1972
- Augustine Ramirez: El Gusto es Suyo
- Yoyito Cabrera: La Carne Lo Mato
- Roberto Roena & Su Apollo Sound: Roberto Roena & Su Apollo Sound
- Julio Iglesias: Por una mujer
- Tito Rodríguez: En Algo Nuevo
- Rolando Laserie: El Rey Guapachoso
- Nelson Ned: El Pequeño Gigante
- Porfi Jiménez: La Machaca
- Ismael Rivera: Esto Fue Lo Que Trajo el Barco
- Juan Torres: Organo Melodico, Vol. 15
- Juan Torres: Organo Melodico, Vol. 16
- Los Ángeles Negros: Vol. 5 : Porque Te Quiero
- Juan Gabriel: El Alma Joven II
- Yolanda del Río: La Hija de Nadie
- Camilo Sesto: Algo de mí
- Sandro de América: Te Espero
- Raphael: Volveré a Nacer
- Tito Puente: Para Los Rumberos
- Andy Harlow: Sorpresa La Flauta
- Elio Roca: Contigo Y Aquí
- Yayo el Indio: El Nuevo Yayo
- Johnny Ventura: En Alas De Quisqueyana
- La Lupe: Stop! I'm Free Again
- Coke: Coke
- Celia Cruz and Tito Puente: Algo Especial Para Recorda
- Johnny Ventura: El Pingüino
- Cheo Feliciano: La Voz Sensual De Cheo
- Charlie Palmieri: El Gigante Del Teclado
- Virginia Lopez: Volverá el Amor
- Carlos Javier Beltrán: Será
- Teddy Trinidad: Teddy Trinidad
- Norman Ponce: Norman Ponce
- Antonio Aguilar: Corridos de Caballos Famosos
- Los Camperos: "El Super Mariachi Los Camperos" En La Fonda
- Típica 73: Típica 73
- Los Solitarios: Nunca Digas
- Juan Marcelo: Yo Te Quiero, Nos Queremos
- Ismael Miranda with Orchestra Harlow: Oportunidad
- Joey Pastrana: Don Pastrana
- Los Alegres de Terán: Corridos Famosos Con Los Alegres De Teran
- Tata Ramos: Dama Dama
- Los Muecos: Indita Mía
- Los Socios del Ritmo: Vida Vamos A Platicar
- Lucho Barrios: El Trotamundo
- Danny Rivera: Danny Rivera/Dos Amantes
- El Super Trio: 73
- Enrique Cáceres: Una Voz Y Un Romance
- Sophy: Yo Soy Mujer y No Soy una Santa
- Manny Perez & Los Cachiros: El Chamaco Moderno
- Vicente Fernández: Vicente Fernandez
- Richie Ray & Bobby Cruz: Jammin' Live
- Bobby Valentín: Soy Boricua
- Camilo Sesto: Sólo un hombre
- Sonora Ponceña: Sonora Ponceña
- Victor Yturbe: Imágenes
- Nino Bravo: Un Beso y una Flor
- Nino Bravo: Mi Tierra
- René y René: El Mexicano
- Anthony Ríos: Anthony Ríos
- José Alfredo Jiménez: Gracias
- The Royal Jesters: Yo Soy Chicano
- Chris Montez and Raza: Let's Dance
- Roberto Carlos: Un gato en la oscuridad
- Juan Gabriel: El Alma Joven II
- Jairo: Jairo
- Novos Baianos: Acabou Chorare
- Milton Nascimento and Lô Borges: Clube da Esquina
- Caetano Veloso: Transa
- Gilberto Gil: Expresso 2222
- Paulinho da Viola: A Dança da Solidão
- Elis Regina: Elis
- José José: De pueblo en pueblo
- José José: Cuando tú me quieras
- Joan Manuel Serrat: Miguel Hernandez
- Rigo Tovar: Matamoros querido
- Jards Macalé: Jards Macalé
- Lô Borges: Lô Borges
- Os Mutantes: Mutantes e Seus Cometas no País do Baurets
- Arthur Verocai: Arthur Verocai
- Maria Bethânia: Drama - Anjo Exterminado
- Sá, Rodrix e Guarabyra: Passado, Presente, Futuro
- Alceu Valença and Geraldo Azevedo: Alceu Valença e Geraldo Azevedo
- Caetano Veloso and Chico Buarque: Caetano e Chico: Juntos e Ao Vivo
- Erasmo Carlos: Sonhos e Memórias 1941-1972
- Dorival Caymmi: Caymmi
- Jorge Ben Jor: Ben
- Rita Lee: Hoje É o Primeiro Dia do Resto da Sua Vida
- Tom Zé: Tom Zé
- Módulo 1000: Não Fale com Paredes
- Pappo's Blues: Pappo's Blues Volumen 2
- Pescado Rabioso: Artaud
- Les Luthiers: Cantata Laxatón
- Óscar Chávez: Latinoamérica canta
- Margot Loyola: Canciones del 900
- Malo: Malo
- Eduardo Mateo: Mateo solo bien se lame
- Arco Iris: Sudamérica o el regreso a la aurora
- Sui Generis: Vida
- Juaneco y Su Combo: El Gran Cacique
- Pappo's Blues: Pappo's Blues Volumen 3
- Víctor Jara: La Población
- Los Terrícolas: Llorarás
- Mercedes Sosa: Cantata sudamericana
- Ghetto Brothers: Power-Fuerza

=== Births ===
- March 4 – Ivy Queen, Puerto Rican reggaeton singer
- March 9 – Giro, Puerto Rican salsa singer
- August 9 – Juanes, Colombian pop rock singer
- December 1 – Manny Manuel, Puerto Rican merengue singer

== 1973 ==
=== Events ===
- November 10 – The 2nd OTI Festival, held at the Palácio das Artes in Belo Horizonte, Brazil, is won by the song "Qué alegre va María", written by Celia Bonfil, and performed by Imelda Miller representing Mexico.

=== Album releases ===
*Rigo Tovar: "Cómo Será La Mujer"
- Tito Rodríguez: 25th Anniversary Performance
- Chaparro: El Padrino
- La Protesta: On The Right Track
- Lissette: Lissette
- Los Antiques: Dís Como Hoy
- Orquesta El Sabor De Nacho: Amada Amante
- Vicente Fernández: Volver, Volver
- Yaco Monti: Vanidad
- La Lupe: ¿Pero Como Va Ser?
- Raphy Leavitt: Jibaro Soy...
- José Alfredo Jiméndez & Alicia Juárez: Jose Alfredo Y Alicia
- Chalo Campos: Elisa
- Conjunto Universal: Que Se Sepa
- Elio Roca: Sin Ti, Se Me Escapa La Vida
- Los Broncos De Reynosa: Mi Ultima Carta
- Estela Nuñez: Iremos De La Mano
- Leo Dan: Leo Dan
- Antonio Aguilar: Antonio Aguilar
- Los Socios del Ritmo: El Cuchillito
- Rey Roig: Otra Vez
- Yndio: Sin Tu Amor
- Conjunto Africa: Todos Tienen Una Maria
- Sunny & The Sunliners: El Internacional
- Los Satelites De Fidencio Ayala: Volver Volver
- Johnny Pacheco: Canta El Conde Tres De Cafe Y Dos De Azucar
- El Gran Combo de Puerto Rico: En Acción
- Eddie Palmieri: Sentido
- Pellín Rodríguez: Amor Por Ti
- Eduardo Zurita: Para Los Enamorados (Vol. 10)
- Augustine Ramirez: Te Quiero Cariñito
- José Miguel Class: Su Voz y Sus Canciones Volume 2
- Josue: Josue
- Latin Breed: The Return of the Latin Breed
- Los Cachorros: El Volumen 3
- Joe Cuba Sextet – Doin' It Right = Hecho Y Derecho
- Tito Puente and His Concert Orchestra: Tito Puente And His Concert Orchestra
- Las Potranquitas Del Norte: Las Potranquitas del Norte
- Lissette: Martes 2 De La Tarde
- Julio Iglesias: Soy
- Ray Barretto: The Other Road
- Imelda Miller: Corazón Vagabundo
- Alberto Vazquez: Con Mariachi
- Ismael Rivera & Sus Cachimbos: Vengo Por La Maceta
- Hilda Murillo: Palabras, Parabras
- Angelica Maria: Angelica María
- Tipica Novel: Se Colo La Novel
- Ismael Miranda & Su Orquesta Revelacion: Asi Se Compone Un Son
- Los Tremendos Gavilanes: Gavilanes Country
- Ramón Ayala: & Los Bravos del Norte: Corazón vagabundo
- Vicente Fernández: Toda Una Época
- Los Ángeles Negros: Vuelven de Nuevo
- Big Lu & Los Muchachos: A Poco No!
- Los Tres Ases: 1973
- Lucha Villa: Puro Norte Vol. 3
- Roberto Torres: El Castigador
- Cheo Feliciano: With a Little Help From My Friend
- Little Joe & La Familia: Total
- El Gran Combo de Puerto Rico: 5
- Combo Miami Brass: "Danger" Alto Contenido en Salsa
- Freddie Martinez: Es La Onda Chicana
- Freddie Martinez: Farolito de Amor
- Los Freddy's: Quiero Ser Feliz
- Vicentico Valdés: Amor Con Salsa
- Willie Colón and Héctor Lavoe: Lo Mato
- Tortilla Factory: Tortilla Factory
- Yolanda Del Rio: Pertenezco A Ti
- Danny Rivera: Danny Rivera/La Distancia
- Conjunto Universal: Conjunto Universal
- Elio Roca: Por Fin Logré Tener Tu Amor
- Lupita D'Alessio: Eres Tu
- Los Baby's: Amor Traicionero
- Hermanas Huerta: Mejor Matame
- Nino Bravo: Y Vol. 5
- Charlie Palmieri & Su Orquesta Vuelve El Gigante
- Antonio Aguilar: Viva El Norte Con... Antonio Aguilar
- Tito Rodríguez: En la Soledad
- Roberto Roena & Su Apollo Sound 5
- Eddie Palmieri: In Concert Live At The University Of Puerto Rico
- Ray Barretto: Indestructible
- Johnny Ventura: Salsa
- Raphael: Raphaël
- Mocedades: Mocedades
- Pellín Rodríguez: Quemame los Ojos
- Rey Roig: Otra Vez
- Juan Torres: Organo Melodico, Vol. 18
- Los Muecas: Presagio
- Cornelio Reyna: Voz y Temperamento
- Angelica Maria: Tonto
- Nelson Ned: Vol. 3
- Heleno: No Son Palabritas
- Bobby Valentín: Rey del Bajo
- Joe Bataan: Salsoul
- Antonio Aguilar: Puras Buenas...
- Tommy Olivencia: Juntos De Nuevo
- Tipica 73: Vol. 2
- Ismael Rivera & Sus Cachimbos – Traigo De Todo
- Imelda Miller: Que Alegre Va Maria
- Opus: Opus
- Nydia Caro: Nydia Caro
- Anthony Ríos: El Sentimental - Vol. 3
- Augustine Ramire: Es Tierra Chicana
- Angelica Maria: ¿A Dónde Va Nuestro Amor? (EP)
- Lucha Villa: Mis Canciones Favoritas
- Rafael Cortijo & His Time Machine*: Y Su Maquina Del Tiempo
- Los Jimaguas: Igualitos y Con Sabor
- Orquesta la Suprema: La Suprema
- Los Humildes: Amor Eterno
- Los Angeles Negros: Los Angeles Negros/A Ti
- Conjunto Acapulco Tropical: Conjunto Acapulco Tropical (1973)
- Los Unicos: Lo Mas Nuevo
- Palito Ortega: Yo Tengo Fe
- Paco de Lucia, Fuente y caudal
- Camilo Sesto: Camilo Sesto
- The Royal Jesters: Their Second Album
- Secos & Molhados: Secos & Molhados
- Raul Seixas: Krig-ha, Bandolo!
- Luiz Melodia: Pérola Negra
- João Gilberto: João Gilberto
- Paulinho da Viola: Nervos de Aço
- Milton Nascimento: Milagre dos Peixes
- Nelson Cavaquinho: Nelson Cavaquinho
- Antônio Carlos Jobim: Jobim
- João Donato: Quem é Quem
- Caetano Veloso: Araçá Azul
- José José: Hasta que vuelvas
- Mari Trini: Ventanas
- Los Mirlos: El sonido selvático
- Elia and Elizabeth: Elia and Elizabeth
- Tom Zé: Todos os Olhos
- Sérgio Sampaio: Eu Quero É Botar meu Bloco na Rua
- Os Tincoãs: Os Tincoãs
- Marcos Valle: Previsão do Tempo
- Tim Maia: Tim Maia
- Sá, Rodrix e Guarabyra: Terra
- Raimundo Fagner: Manera Fru Fru, Manera: O Último Pau de Arara
- Som Imaginário: Matança do Porco
- Walter Franco: Ou Não
- Eumir Deodato: Prelude
- Zé Rodrix: I Acto
- Edu Lobo: Edu Lobo
- Gal Costa: Índia
- Novos Baianos: Novos Baianos F.C.
- Elomar: ...Das Barrancas do Rio Gavião
- Guilherme Lamounier: Guilherme Lamounier
- Odair José: Odair José
- Cassiano: Apresentamos Nosso Cassiano
- Wara: El Inca
- Gato Barbieri: Chapter One: Latin America
- Pescado Rabioso: Artaud
- El Polen: Fuera de la ciudad
- Eumir Deodato: Deodato 2
- Los Jaivas: Los Jaivas
- Pablo Milanés: Versos José Martí cantados por Pablo Milanés
- Vytas Brenner: La ofrenda de Vytas Brenner

=== Deaths ===
- April 16 – Nino Bravo, Spanish pop singer
- November 23 – José Alfredo Jiménez, Mexican ranchera singer

=== Births ===
- February 8 – Fanny Lu, Colombian tropipop singer
- July 21 – Fey, Mexican pop singer
- July 31 – Jerry Rivera, Puerto Rican salsa singer

== 1974 ==
=== Events ===
- October 26 – The 3rd OTI Festival, held at the Teatro Juan Ruiz de Alarcón of the Centro de Convenciones in Acapulco, Mexico, is won by the song "Hoy canto por cantar", written by Ricardo Ceratto and Nydia Caro, and performed by Caro herself representing Puerto Rico.

=== Album releases ===
- Eddie Palmieri: Sun of Latin Music
- Bobby Paunetto: Paunetto's Point
- Irakere: Teatro Amadeo Roldán – Recital
- Elis Regina and Antônio Carlos Jobim: Elis & Tom
- Sunny & The Sunliners: El Preferido
- Francisco Avitia: Zacazonapan
- Los Diablos: Vol. 4
- Luis Garcia: Cerca De Ti
- Teddy Trinidad – Rompamos El Contrato
- Larry Harlow: Salsa
- Willy Chirino: One Man Alone
- Johnny Ventura y Su Combo Show: La Protesta De Los Feos
- Latin Breed: Mas Latin Breed!
- Sunny And The Sunliners: El Orgullo de Texas
- Amalia Mendoza and El Mariachi Juvenil de Manuel Valle: La Tariacuri
- Danny Rivera: Danny Rivera en Concierto
- Enrique Lynch Y Su Conjunto – Llegó La Banda
- Rosenda Bernal: Rosenda Bernal
- Vitín Avilés: Canta Al Amor
- Vicente Fernández: Vicente Fernández/Me Caso el Sabado
- Justo Betancourt: Sigo Bravo
- Blanca Rosa Gil: Punto Aparte...Y Hacia Adelante!
- Wild Wind: Wild Wind
- Charytín: Charytin
- Ramón Ayala & Los Bravos Del Norte: La Nueva Zenaida - El Amor Que Me Falta
- Marco Antonio Muñiz: Te Quiero Pero... Me Arrepiento
- Oscar de Fontana: - Te Esperare En La Playa
- Los Freddy's: Llegara Tu Final
- Estela Nuñez: Tú Sigues Siendo El Mismo
- Juan Torres: Organo Melodico Vol. 20
- Little Joe: Nosotros
- El Chicano: Cinco
- Lucha Villa: Lo Mejor De Jose Alfredo Jimenez
- Celia Cruz and Johnny Pacheco: Celia & Johnny
- Conjunto Universal: Dando Candela
- Raul Marrero: La Nueva Era
- Johnny Zamot: Zamot
- Pete "El Conde" Rodríguez: El Conde
- Eddie Palmieri: Recorded Live At Sing Sing Volume 2
- Raphael: Que Diran De Mi
- Orquesta Tipica Tropical: Salsa Sí
- Ismael Miranda: En Fa Menor
- Cheo Feliciano: Looking For Love (Buscando Amor)
- Fania All Stars: Latin-Soul-Rock
- Elio Roca: Porque Te Quiero, Es Mi Unica Verdad
- José Antonio: El "Feeling" Unico
- Olguita Alvarez: Cuando Estoy En Tus Brazos
- Tito Puente & His Orchestra Tito Unlimited
- Los Muecas: Hoguera De Amor
- Juan Torres Y Su Organo Melódico: A Borinquen - Vol. 21
- Sonora Ponceña: Sabor Sureño
- La Conspiracion: Cada Loco Con Su Tema
- Roberto Torres & Alfredo "Chocolate" Armenteros: Juntos
- Kako: Kako
- Willie Colón, Hector Lavoe and Yomo Toro: Asalto Navideño Vol. II
- Ismael Quintana: Ismael Quintana
- King Clave: Los Hombres No Deben Llorar
- Julio Iglesias: A flor de piel
- Los Jovenes Del Hierro: Si Tienes Verguenza
- Fernando Albuerne: Nosotros
- Joseíto Mateo y Su Combo: Cállese La Boca Compay..!
- Antonio Aguilar: A Mi Querido Puerto Rico
- Rosenda Bernal: La Esposa Olvidada
- Graciela: Esa Soy Yo, Yo Soy Asi
- Bobby Valentín: In Motion
- Sonia López: Voz, Sentimiento y Amor
- Vicente Fernández El Ídolo de Mexico
- Rafael Cortijo and Ismael Rivera: Juntos Otra Vez
- The Judge's Nephews: Los Sobrinos del Juez
- Yolanda Del Rio: Hoy Te Toca Dormir En El Suelo ¡Ay Mama Lo Que Te Dijé!
- Latin Breed: Minus One
- Los Baby's: Como Sufro
- Los Tremendos Gavilanes: Cuando Paso Por Tu Casa
- Los Humildes: Un Pobre No Más
- Richie Ray and Bobby Cruz: 1975
- Camilo Sesto: Camilo
- Conjunto Universal: Tremendo Disco
- Sandro de America: Sandro... Siempre Sandro
- Banda Macho: La Super Banda De Mexico
- Tico-Alegre All Stars: Live At Carnegie Hall Vol. 1
- Simón Díaz and Hugo Blanco & su Conjunto: Las Gaitas De Simon
- Raphael: Raphael Amor Mío
- Mocedades: 5
- Danny Daniel: Danny Daniel
- Larry Harlow: Live In Quad
- José Mangual & Carlos "Patato" Valdez: Understanding Latin Rhythms Vol. 1
- Monguito Santamaria: En Una Nota!
- La Sonora Matancera: 50 Años
- Ray Rodriguez And Duro: Ray Rodriguez And Duro
- Rigo Tovar & Su Costa Azul: En La Cumbre
- Carlos Guzman: Carlos Guzman
- Peñaranda & Su Conjunto: Nuevamente Peñaranda & Su Conjunto
- Roberto Carlos: Yo Te Recuerdo
- Germaín De La Fuente: El Angel Negro
- Estrellita: Quien Te Dijo Que Te Quiero
- Marco Antonio Muñiz: Salsa Tropical
- Freddy Fender: Before The Next Teardrop Falls
- Los Baby's: Un Viejo Amor
- Juan Torres: Y Su Organo Melodico Vol. 22
- Freddie Martinez: Don Freddie Martinez
- Roberto Pulido & Los Clasicos: Da Vinci (Volume 2)
- Julio Iglesias: El amor
- Tipica Novel: Sabrosa Novel
- Los Chavales De España: Los Chavales De España
- La Pandilla: La Pandilla
- Tambo: Al Santiago Presents Tambo
- Freddy Fender: She Thinks I Still Care
- Ruben Ramos & The Mexican Revolution: Quiero Una Cita
- Mike Laure Y Sus Cometas: Mariposas Locas-Los Borrachitos
- Los Kasinos: Triunfadores
- Tortilla Factory: Made In America
- Juan Gabriel and Vargas de Tecalitlán: Juan Gabriel con el Mariachi Vargas de Tecalitlán
- Conjunto Quisqueya: Que Bueno Ta' Este Pais
- Sophy: Que Vas A Hacer Sin Mí
- Aldo Monges: El Trovador Romantico De Cordoba
- Alberto Cortez: Como El Ave Solitaria
- Jorge Ben: A Tábua de Esmeralda
- Arnaldo Baptista: Lóki?
- Cartola: Cartola
- Gal Costa: Cantar
- José José: Vive
- Joan Manuel Serrat: Canción infantil
- Simón Díaz: Tonadas
- Los Van Van: Los Van Van Vol. III
- Astor Piazzolla: Libertango
- Cartola: Cartola
- Martinho da Vila: Canta Canta, Minha Gente
- Raul Seixas: Gita
- Adoniran Barbosa: Adoniran Barbosa
- Alceu Valença: Molhado de Suor
- Novos Baianos: Novos Baianos
- Som Nosso de Cada Dia: Snegs
- Os Mutantes: Tudo Foi Feito pelo Sol
- Ave Sangria: Ave Sangria
- Elis Regina: Elis
- Egberto Gismonti: Academia de Danças
- Clara Nunes: Alvorecer
- Secos & Molhados: Secos & Molhados
- Quinteto Armorial: Do Romance ao Galope Nordestino
- Gal Costa: Cantar
- Moto Perpétuo: Moto Perpétuo
- A Barca do Sol: A Barca do Sol
- Jards Macalé: Aprender a nadar
- Jorge Mautner: Jorge Mautner
- Ednardo: O Romance do Pavão Mysteriozo
- Rita Lee and Tutti Frutti: Atrás do Porto Tem uma Cidade
- Ivan Lins: Modo Livre
- Soledad Bravo: Cantos de Venezuela
- Inti-Illimani: La Nueva Canción Chilena (Inti-Illimani 2)
- Dimensión Latina: Dimensión Latina '75
- Climax: Gusano Mecánico
- Cecilia Todd: Pajarillo verde

=== Births ===
- January 30 – Charlie Zaa, Colombian bolero singer
- March 8 – Carlos Baute, Venezuelan pop singer
- April 18 – Millie Corretjer, Puerto Rican pop singer
- May 16 – Laura Pausini, Italian pop singer
- December 8 – Cristian Castro, Mexican pop singer

== 1975 ==
=== Events ===
- May 17 – The Recording Academy announces that it will include a new category for Latin music for the following Grammy Awards. This marks the first time that a Grammy Award is presented for Latin music.
- November 15 – The 4th OTI Festival, held at the WKAQ-TV studios in San Juan, Puerto Rico, is won by the song "La felicidad", written by Felipe Gil, and performed by Gualberto Castro representing Mexico.

=== Album releases ===
- Eddie Palmieri: Unfinished Masterpiece
- Johnny Pacheco: El Maestro
- Fania All-Stars: Live At Yankee Stadium Vol. 1
- Mongo Santamaría: Afro-Indio
- Ray Barretto: Barretto
- Willie Colón: The Good, the Bad, the Ugly
- Cornelio Reyna: Cornelio Reyna/Cuatro Estrellas en el Cielo
- Chayito Valdez: Se Marchó
- Felipe Arriaga: El Nuevo Ídolo De La Canción Ranchera
- Los Unicos: Siempre! Los Unicos
- Los Clasicos de Roberto Pulido: Quien?
- Joe Bataan: Afrofilipino
- Hector Lavoe: La Voz
- Orquesta Aragon: 75
- Johnny Ventura & Su Combo: En Accion
- El Gran Trio: A Que No Te Atreves
- Los Kasinos: Los Kasinos
- Vikki Carr: Hoy (Today)
- Fania All Stars: Live At Yankee Stadium (Vol. 2)
- Sunny & The Sunliners: Los Enamorados
- Julio Iglesias: A México
- El Gran Combo de Puerto Rico: 7
- Little Joe & La Familia: Mañana
- José Fajardo: Fajardo & Sus Estrellas Del 75
- Morris Albert: Morris Albert En Español
- Joe Quijano Y Su Orquesta: Ahora
- Conjunto Universal: Super-Power
- The Lebron Brothers: 4 + 1 = The Lebron Brothers
- Angelica Maria: Before The Next Teardrop Falls
- King Clave: Mi Corazón Lloro
- Vicente Fernández: El Hijo del Pueblo
- Anacani: Anacani
- Orquesta Broadway: Salvaje
- Ismael Rivera: Soy Feliz
- Yolanda Del Rio: Se Me Olvidó Otra Vez
- Latin Breed: U.S.A.
- Sunny & The Sunliners: Carinosamente
- Celia Cruz & Johnny Pacheco: Tremendo Caché
- Gerardo Reyes: El Rey De Los Caminos
- Tipica 73: La Candela
- Roberto Carlos: Quiero Verte A Mi Lado
- Cornelio Reyna & Su Conjunto: Cuando Escuches Este Vals
- The Salsoul Orchestra: Salsoul Orchestra
- Grupo Folklorico Y Experimental Nuevayorquino: Concepts in Unity
- El Gran Combo de Puerto Rico: El Gran Combo – ¿tu Querias Salsa? ¡Toma Salsa! Con El Gran Combo
- Tito Puente: No Hay Mejor (There Is No Better)
- Al Santiago Presents Yambú: Yambú
- Emilio José: Mi Barca
- Justo Betancourt: Lo Sabemos
- Rumba Tres: Rumba Tres
- José Antonio: Después Del Festival...
- Sophy Hernández: Sentimientos, Feelings
- Toro: Toro
- Larry Harlow: El Judio Maravilloso
- Yolandita Monge: Floreciendo!
- Rigo Tovar & Su Costa Azul: En Acción
- Los Humildes: Mas Mas Mas Mas
- The Royal Jesters: The Band
- Tony de la Rosa: Mi Ultima Parranda
- Vicente Fernández: Canta Para Recordar
- Luis Santi & Su Conjunto: El Bigote
- Alvarez Guedes: Alvarez Guedes 2
- Camilo Sesto: Amor Libre
- Rafael Cortijo & Su Nuevo Combo: Champions
- Los Diablos: Mexico Es
- Ismael Miranda: Este Es Ismael Miranda
- Freddy Fender: Canta En Español Antes De La Segunda Lagrima
- Little Joe & La Familia: Brown Stuff
- Rosenda Bernal: A La Edad De 14 Años
- Los Kasinos and Cecilio Garza: El Poderoso
- Renacimiento 74: Vol. III
- Los Terricolas: Una Carta
- Bobby Rodriguez & La Compañia: Lead Me to That Beautiful Band
- Sandro de America: Tú Me Enloqueces
- Marco Antonio Muñiz Tiempo y Destiempo
- Los Tigres Del Norte: Contrabando Y Traicion
- Los Felinos: Chicanisimo
- Orquesta Novel: With a Touch Of Brass
- Los Pasteles Verdes: Vol. II
- Jimmy Edward Memories (Recuerdos)
- Raul Marrero: Apartamento No 2
- Bobby Valentín: Va a La Carcel
- Iris Chacon: Iris Chacon (1975)
- Richie Ray & Bobby Cruz: 10 Aniversario (10th Anniversary)
- Los Terricolas: Los Terricolas En Mexico
- Los Unicos: Todavia
- Carlos Guzman: La Costumbre
- Los Alegres De Teran: Los Contrabandistas Sus Corridos y Sus Leyendas
- Los Cadetes De Linares: Los Dos Amigos
- The Latin Breed: Power Drive
- Charlie Palmieri: Impulsos
- Markolino Dimond: Beethoven's V
- Tipica Novel: Tipicante
- El Gran Combo de Puerto Rico: Mejor Que Nunca (Better Than Ever)
- Augstin Ramirez: (Si El No Quierre Tu Carino) Damelo
- Fania All Stars: Tribute To Tito Rodriguez
- Larry Harlow and Ismael Miranda: Con Mi Viejo Amigo
- Kako & Azuquita: Union Dinamica
- Raphael: Con El Sol De La Mañana
- Carmen Silva: Que Dios Proteja Nuestro Amor Amor Sin Fronteras
- Los Junior: Le Cantan Al Amor
- Sunny And The Sunliners: Siempre
- Roberto Carlos: Roberto Carlos (1975)
- Alberto Vazquez: Rancheras Románticas
- Los Humildes: Numero 4
- Roberto Yanes: La Voz Romantica
- Vitin Aviles: Otra Vez Con Amor
- Tania: Inigualable
- Los Tres Grandes: Reflexionando
- Ricardo Ceratto: Me Estoy Acostumbrando A Ti
- Los Felinos: Flor Morena Flecha De Amor
- Mocedades: La Otra España
- Juan Bau: Penas
- Flaco Jimenez: El Rey De Texas
- Danny Daniel: Sé Que Me Engañaste Un Día
- Angel Canales: Sabor
- Elio Roca: Yo Soy....
- Rita Lee and Tutti Frutti: Fruto Proibido
- Tim Maia: Racional, Vol. 1
- Gilberto Gil: Refazenda
- Walter Franco: Revolver
- Raul Seixas: Novo Aeon
- Gilberto Gil and Jorge Ben: Gil e Jorge
- Caetano Veloso: Jóia
- José José: Tan Cerca...Tan Lejos
- Joan Manuel Serrat: ... Para Piel De Manzana
- Amparo Ochoa: El cancionero popular
- Silvio Rodríguez: Días y flores
- Rita Lee and Tutti Frutti: Fruto Proibido
- Arnaldo Baptista: Loki?
- Milton Nascimento: Minas
- Tim Maia: Tim Maia Racional, Vol. 2
- Gilberto Gil and Jorge Ben Jor: Ogum Xangô
- Walter Franco: Revolver
- João Bosco: Caça à Raposa
- Di Melo: Di Melo
- Clara Nunes: Claridade
- O Terço: Criaturas da Noite
- Caetano Veloso: Qualquer Coisa
- João Donato: Lugar Comum
- Ney Matogrosso: Água do Céu - Pássaro
- Adoniran Barbosa: Adoniran Barbosa
- Alcione Nazareth: A Voz do Samba
- Casa das Máquinas: Lar de Maravilhas
- Azymuth: Azimüth
- Arthur Moreira Lima: Arthur Moreira Lima Interpreta Ernesto Nazareth
- Emílio Santiago: Emílio Santiago
- Andrés Landero y su Conjunto: El Tigre del Acordeón
- Los Grillos: Vibraciones latinoamericanas
- La Rondallita: El Burrito de Belén

=== Births ===
- May 8 – Enrique Iglesias, Spanish pop singer

== 1976 ==
=== Events ===
- February 28 – For the first time in Latin music history, a Grammy Award is presented to the genre. Eddie Palmieri wins the Grammy Award for Best Latin Recording at the 18th Annual Grammy Awards for Sun of Latin Music.
- April 17 – Billboard tracks sales of LP's in Puerto Rico for the first time.
- July 31 – Billboard divides Latin LP's into two separate genres for the first time into "Pop LP's" and "Salsa LP's" for the selected regions of the US.
- October 30 – The 5th OTI Festival, held at the Teatro Juan Ruiz de Alarcón of the Centro de Convenciones in Acapulco, Mexico, is won by the song "Canta cigarra", written and performed by María Ostiz representing Spain.

=== Album releases ===
- Fivestones: De Fiesta Con El Bailongo Con Don Francisco
- Ray Barretto Band: Tomorrow: Barretto Live
- Tito Puente: The Legend
- Eydie Gorme: La Gorme
- Fania All-Stars: Salsa (Original Soundtrack)
- Joe Cuba: Cocinando la Salsa
- Mongo Santamaría: Sofrito
- Carlos Guzman, Mariachi Mexico: El Cuatrero
- Corporacion Latina: Llego' Pa' Quedarse
- Rigo Tovar & Su Costa Azul: Te Quiero Dijiste
- Roberto Torres: De Nuevo
- Los Tigres del Norte: La Banda Del Carro Rojo
- Wally González: Tu y Tu C.B.
- Josue: Buscando Estrellitas
- Sunny & The Sunliners: Yesterday... & Sunny
- Vicente Fernández: A Tu Salud
- Lucía Méndez: Siempre Estoy Pensando En Ti...
- Bobby Capó: Simplemente... Amor
- Fajardo '76: La Raiz De La Charanga - "Charanga Roots"
- Charanga 76: Charanga 76
- Cheo Feliciano: The Singer
- Conjunto Candela: Conjunto Candela
- Chocolate & Su Orquesta: En El Rincon
- Orquesta Tipica Ideal: Vamonos Pa' Senegal Para Bailar Y Gozar
- Roberto Roena & Su Apollo Sound: Lucky 7
- Mario Quintero: Nomas Contigo
- Snowball & Company: Snowball & Co
- Los Tigres del Norte: Pueblo Querido
- Tony de la Rosa: Tony De La Rosa
- Gilberto Monroig: Salud Cariño
- Jimmy Edward: Solo
- Héctor Lavoe: De Ti Depende
- Chelo and El Mariachi Oro Y Plata De José Chávez: Chelo
- Julio Iglesias: America
- Celia Cruz, Johnny Pacheco, Justo Betancourt, and Papo Lucca: Recordando El Ayer
- Super Tipica de Estrellas: Super Tipica De Estrellas
- Chino Y Su Conjunto Melao: 100% Bailable
- Roberto Carlos: Tu Cuerpo
- Carlos "Patato" Valdes: Authority
- Danny Rivera: Temas De Peliculas
- Wilkins: Wilkins
- Wilfrido Vargas & Sus Beduinos: Wilfrido Vargas & Sus Beduinos
- Sonora Ponceña: Musical Conquest (Conquista Musical)
- Fania All Stars: Delicate And Jumpy
- Puerto Rico All Stars: Puerto Rico All Stars
- Haciendo Punto En Otro Son: Haciendo Punto En Otro Son
- King Clave: Por Culpa Tuya
- Augustin Ramirez: No.1 Otra Vez
- Pete "El Conde" Rodríguez: Este Negro Si Es Sabroso
- Jose Ortiz: Trullando En Puerto Rico
- El Gran Trio: X Aniversario
- Sophy: Te Pido Que Te Quedes Esta Noche
- Los Angeles Negros: Despacito
- Elio Roca: Internacional
- Luis García: Tras El Cristal
- Blanca Rosa Gil: Sigo Siendo Reina
- Conjunto Universal: Conjunto Universal VII
- Los Kimbos Con Adalberto Santiago: Los Kimbos Con Adalberto Santiago
- Little Joe: Que Suave Loco!
- Freddy Fender: Recordando Los '50
- Tortilla Factory: Andando En La Parranda
- Ramon Ayala & Los Bravos Del Norte: Dinastia De La Muerte
- Miguel Gallardo: 2
- Los Pasteles Verdes: Ruega Por Nosotros - Vol. 4
- Jose Miguel Class: Tuyo En Vida Y Muerte
- Danny Rivera: Alborada
- Los Terricolas: Un Sueño
- Luciana: En La Soledad De Mi Apartamento
- Beatriz Adriana: Gozar y Gozar
- Diego Verdaguer: Volvere
- Los Baby's: Morir Contigo
- LeBrón Brothers: Distinto Y Diferente
- Jerry Masucci: Salsa Greats
- Ray Barretto: Tomorrow: Barretto Live
- Cheo Feliciano: Cheo's Rainbow
- Dimension Latina: Dimension Latina En Nueva York
- Yolanda del Rio: El Día Que Me Acaricies Lloraré
- Jay Garcia And The Crusader Band: Mastedonte B.C.
- Mon Rivera: Mon Y Sus Trombones
- Tipica 73: Rumba Caliente
- Rafael Cortijo and Ismael Rivera: La Quiniela Del Dia
- Olga Guillot: Se Me Olvidó Otra Vez
- Lissette: Quiereme
- Perla: ¡Hipocresia!
- Camilo Sesto: Memorias
- Los Melódicos: Marcando El Ritmo
- Juan Gabriel: Juan Gabriel con Mariachi Vol. II
- Grupo Miramar: Una Lágrima y Un Recuerdo
- Manolo Muñoz: Llamarada
- Bobby Rodriguez & La Compañia: Salsa at Woodstock (Recorded Live)
- Bobby Valentín: Afuera
- Libre: Con Salsa Con Ritmo, Vol. 1
- Lucha Villa: No Me Dejes, Nunca, Nunca
- Raphael: Canta...
- Antonio Aguilar: Soy Inocente
- Lola Beltrán: Lola "La Grande"
- Amalia Mendoza: Con Mariachi
- Little Joe, Johnny Hernandez, and Benny Munoz: Que Suave Loco!
- Orquesta Broadway: Pasaporte
- Wilfrido Vargas & Sus Beduinos: Wilfrido Vargas & Sus Beduinos
- Orchestra Harlow: El Jardinero del Amor
- Saoco: Siempre Seré Guajiro
- Raphy Leavitt & La Selecta Orchestra: De Frente A La Vida..Facing Life...
- Tito Allen: Feliz Y Dichoso
- Richie Ray & Bobby Cruz: Reconstrucción
- Cachao: Cachao Y Su Descarga 77 Vol. 1
- Nelson Ned: Por La Puerta Grande
- Los Freddy's: Un Sentimiento`
- Dueto Frontera: La Provincia Canta
- Felipe Rodriguez: La Voz Con Los Antares
- Claudia de Colombia: Volumen 7
- Sociedad 76: Sociedad 76
- Los Potros: Cantando Llega El Amor
- Lolita Flores: Abrázame
- Carlos Torres Vila: Carlos Torres Vila
- José María Napoleón: Vive
- Jose Luis Gazcón: La Onda De Jose Luis Gazcón
- Hugo Blanco: Bailables No. 11
- Emir Boscán & Los Tomasinos: 5 Compas
- Elio Roca: Te Necesito Tanto Amor
- Vicente Fernández: ¿Gusta Usted? (Joyas Rancheras Al Estilo De Vicente Fernandez)
- Rocío Jurado: Amor Marinero
- Grupo Miramar: Una Lagrima y un Recuerdo
- Los Angeles Negros: Bolerisimo
- Juan Gabriel: Juan Gabriel con Mariachi Vol. II
- Cartola: Cartola II
- Tom Zé: Estudando o Samba
- Elis Regina: Falso Brilhante
- Chico Buarque: Meus Caros Amigos
- Tim Maia: Tim Maia Racional Vol 2
- Jorge Ben: África Brasil
- Caetano Veloso, Gal Costa, Gilberto Gil, and Maria Bethânia: Doces Bárbaros
- José José: El Príncipe
- Pablo Milanés: Pablo Milanés
- Los Palmeras: Los Palmeras
- Belchior: Alucinação
- Cassiano: Cuban Soul:18 Kilates
- Guilherme Arantes: Guilherme Arantes
- Antônio Carlos Jobim: Urubu
- Lula Côrtes and Zé Ramalho: Paêbirú
- Milton Nascimento: Geraes
- Taiguara: Imyra, Tayra, Ipy, Taiguara
- Alceu Valença: Vivo!
- Joelho de Porco: São Paulo 1554/Hoje
- Egberto Gismonti e Academia de Danças: Corações Futuristas
- Djavan: A Voz, o Violão, a Música de Djavan
- Sérgio Sampaio: Tem Que Acontecer
- Luiz Melodia: Maravilhas Contemporâneas
- João Bosco: Galos de Briga
- Gal Costa: Gal Canta Caymmi
- Rita Lee and Tutti Frutti: Entradas e Bandeiras
- Joyce: Passarinho Urbano
- Paulinho da Viola: Memórias Cantando
- Opa: Goldenwings
- Lola Beltrán: El Palacio de las Bellas Artes abre sus Puertas a La Reyna de la Canción Ranchera
- Invisible: El jardín de los presentes
- Los Kjarkas: Bolivia
- Rigo Tovar Y su Costa Azul: Amor Y Cumbia

=== Deaths ===
- August 2 – Cecilia, Spanish singer-songwriter

=== Births ===
- January 8 – Alexandre Pires, Brazilian pop singer and lead singer of Só Pra Contrariar
- February 3 – Daddy Yankee, Puerto Rican reggaeton singer
- October 6 – Yotuel Romero, Cuban rapper and member of Orishas

== 1977 ==
=== Events ===
- February 19 – Eddie Palmieri wins the Grammy Award for Best Latin Recording at the 19th Annual Grammy Awards for Unfinished Masterpiece.
- November 12 – The 6th OTI Festival, held at the Centro Cultural de la Villa de Madrid auditorium, in Madrid, Spain, is won by the song "Quincho Barrilete", written by Carlos Mejía Godoy, and performed by Guayo González representing Nicaragua.

=== Album releases ===
- Mongo Santamaría: Dawn
- Eydie Gormé and Danny Rivera: Muy Amigos (Close Friends)
- Machito Orchestra with Lalo Rodríguez: Fireworks
- Rosenda Bernal: La Nueva Ley
- Chino Y Su Conjunto Melao: Chino Y Su Conjunto Melao
- Willie Colón and Ruben Blades: Metiendo Mano
- Brown Express: Maquina 501
- Renacimiento 74: Viajando
- Johnny Pacheco The Artist
- Charanga 76: Encore
- Roberto Roena & Su Apollo Sound: La 8va. Maravilla
- Justo Betancourt: Distinto & Diferente
- Tito Puente: The Legend
- Costa Chica: Tapame
- Vicente Fernández: La Muerte de un Gallero
- Fania All Stars: Rhythm Machine
- Willie Colón: El Baquine de Angelitos Negros
- Ray Barretto: Energy To Burn
- Gerardo Reyes: Ya Vas Carnal
- Yolanda Del Rio: Yolanda Del Rio
- Miguel Gallardo: "Desnudate" Tema Censurado
- Felito Felix: El Cantautor
- Oscar Solo: Oscar Solo
- Danny Rivera: Danny Rivera
- Camilo Sesto: Rasgos
- Charytin: La Dulce Charytin
- Tipica 73: The Two Sides of Tipica 73
- José Fajardo: El Talento Total
- Ismael Miranda: No Voy Al Festival
- Los Kimbos: The Big Kimbos
- Ismael Rivera: De Todas Maneras Rosas
- La Sonora Ponceña: El Gigante del Sur
- Los Tigres del Norte: Vivan Los Mojados
- Grupo La Cruz: Cumbias, Merequetengues y Zapateados
- La Tropa Chicana: Tu Nuevo Cariñito
- Los Cadetes de Linares: Cruzando El Puente - De Ramones A Los Algodones
- Oscar D'Leon: 2 Sets Con Oscar
- Renacimiento 74: Perdido Para Siempre
- Roberto Pulido & Los Clasicos: Copa Tras Copa
- Cornelio Reyna: Te Vas Angel Mio
- Jimmy Edward: Love Songs
- Miami Sound Machine: Live Again (Renacer)
- Mario Echevarria: En Este Momento Y A Estas Horas...
- Tomas De San Julian: Tomas De San Julian
- Lissette: Justo Yo
- Pablo Abraira: 30 De Febrero
- Tommy Olivencia: El Negro Chombo
- Los Hijos Del Rey: Los Hijos Del Rey
- El Gran Combo de Puerto Rico: Internacional
- Pupi Legarreta and Johnny Pacheco: Los Dos Mosqueteros
- Ricardo Marrero and The Group: Time
- Little Joe Y La Familia: La Voz de Aztlan
- José José: Reencuentro
- Charlie Palmieri and Meñique: Con Salsa y Sabor
- Cepillin: La Feria de Cepillin Vol. II
- Rigo Tovar & Su Costa Azul: Dos Tardes De Mi Vida
- Los Humildes: Besitos, Besitos, Besitos
- Los Baby's: Regresa Ya
- Dimension Latina: Los Generales de la Salsa
- Elio Roca: El Show De Elio Roca
- Lucía Méndez: Frente A Frente
- Julio Iglesias: A mis 33 años
- Nelson Ned: El Romantico De America
- José María Napoleón: Hombre
- Grupo Alpha: Grupo Alpha
- Los Muecas: Indita Querida
- Los Solitarios: Sabor De Engaño
- Celia Cruz and Willie Colón: Only They Could Have Made This Album
- Wilkins – No Se Puede Morir Por Dentro
- Marco Antonio Muñiz: Canta...Para Usted
- José María Napoleón Pajarillo
- Roberto Roena & Su Apollo Sound: 9
- Yambú: The African Queen
- Ralphy Santi: Ralphy Santi & Su Conjunto
- Junior Gonzalez: Tiempos Buenos / Good Times
- Dyango: Contigo en la Distancia
- Cheo Feliciano: Mi Tierra y Yo
- Roberto Carlos: Roberto Carlos '77/Amigo
- Rocío Dúrcal: Canta a Juan Gabriel
- Dimension Latina 78: 780 Kilos de Salsa
- Raul Vale: Eres Toda Una Mujer
- Raphael: El Cantor
- Josue: Tengo La Sangre De Indio
- Lucía Méndez: Lucía Méndez
- Orchestra Harlow: La Raza Latina - A Salsa Suite
- Pete "El Conde" Rodriguez: A Touch of Class
- Los Pasteles Verdes: Mi Amor Imposible
- Basilio: Demasiado Amor
- Juan Bau: 5
- José Velez: Romantica
- Olga Guillot: Olga Guillot
- Los Bukis: Los Alambrados Y Otros Exitos
- Yolanda Del Rio: Tradicionales Al Estilo De Yolanda Del Rio
- Johnny Pacheco and Melón: Llegó Melón
- Tito Allen: Ahora y Siempre
- Conjunto Impacto: Conjunto Impacto
- Vitin Aviles: Con Mucha Salsa
- Los Angeles Negros: Serenata Sin Luna
- Costa Chica: Sensacional
- Lucha Villa: Interpreta a Juan Gabriel
- Punto Sur: Juguete Caro
- Chucho Avellanet: Y Hoy Me Recuerdas...
- Willy Chirino: Evolucion
- Alvarez Guedes: 6
- Mocedades: 8
- Little Joe y La Familia: Caliente
- Johnny Ventura & Su Combo: Excitante
- Cepillin: Volumen III Vamos A La Escuela/Tamborileiro
- Billo's Caracas Boys: Billo 78
- Camilo Sesto: Entre Amigos
- Lolita: Mi Carta
- Wilkins: Amarse Un Poco
- Yolandita Monge: Soy Ante Todo Mujer
- Armando Manzanero: Corazón Salvaje (soundtrack)
- Danny Rivera: Para Toda La Vida
- Sunny & The Sunliners: Andale Mi Amor
- José Mangual Jr.: Tribute to Chano Pozo
- Los Bravos del Norte de Ramón Ayala: Que Me Lleve El Diablo
- Los Polifaceticos: Ocho Palabras
- Yndio: V Aniversario
- Ismael Rivera and Rafael Cortijo: Llaves De La Tradicion
- LeBrón Brothers: 10th Anniversary
- Cachao: Dos
- Joan Sebastian: Y Las Mariposas
- Conjunto Acapulco Tropical: Noches de Cabaret (soundtrack)
- Tony de la Rosa: Dame Una Cachetada
- Diego Verdaguer: Diego Verdaguer
- Charanga Chicago: La China
- José Luis Rodríguez: Una Canción De España...
- Eddie Palmieri: The Music Man
- Guarare: Guarare
- Banda Black Rio: Maria Fumaça
- Gilberto Gil: Refavela
- João Gilberto: Amoroso
- Carlos Mejía Godoy y Los de Palacagüina: El son nuestro de cada día
- Binomio de Oro: Por lo alto
- Ñanda Mañachi 1
- La Máquina de Hacer Pájaros: Películas
- Hermeto Pascoal: Slaves mas
- El Kinto: Circa 1968

=== Best-selling albums ===
The following is a list of the top 5 best-selling Latin albums of 1977 in the United States divided into the categories of Latin pop and salsa, according to Billboard.

| Category | Rank | Album | Artist |
|---|---|---|---|
| Latin pop | 1 | America | Julio Iglesias |
| Latin pop | 2 | Juan Gabriel con Mariachi Vol. II | Juan Gabriel |
| Latin pop | 3 | A México | Julio Iglesias |
| Latin pop | 4 | Memorias | Camilo Sesto |
| Latin pop | 5 | El Amor | Julio Iglesias |
| Salsa | 1 | Recordando El Ayer | Celia Cruz, Johnny Pacheco, Justo Betancourt, and Papo Lucca |
| Salsa | 2 | De Ti Depende | Héctor Lavoe |
| Salsa | 3 | Metiendo Mano | Willie Colón and Rubén Blades |
| Salsa | 4 | The Artist | Johnny Pacheco |
| Salsa | 5 | Pasaporte | Orquesta Broadway |

=== Births ===
- January 14 – Yandel, Puerto Rican reggaeton singer
- January 21 – Frankie Negrón, American salsa singer
- January 22 – Mario Domm, Mexican pop singer-songwriter, lead member of Camila
- February 2 – Shakira, Colombian pop singer

== 1978 ==
=== Events ===
- February 23 – Mongo Santamaría wins the Grammy Award for Best Latin Recording at the 20th Annual Grammy Awards for Dawn.
- December 2 – The 7th OTI Festival, held at the Municipal Theatre in Santiago, Chile, is won by the song "El amor... cosa tan rara", written and performed by Denisse de Kalafe representing Brazil.

=== Album releases ===
- Celia Cruz and Johnny Pacheco: Eternos
- Willie Colón and Rubén Blades: Siembra
- Tito Puente: Homenaje a Beny Moré
- Eddie Palmieri: Lucumi, Macumba, Voodoo
- Laurindo Almeida: Laurindo Almeida Trio
- Mongo Santamaría: A La Carte
- Juan Gabriel: Siempre en Mi Mente
- Danny Daniel: Nunca Supé La Verdad
- Los Huracanes del Norte: Son Tus Perjumenes...Mujer!
- Los Freddy's: Cariñito Malo
- Los Alvarado: Son Tus Perjumenes Mujer
- Ray Conniff: Exitos Latinos
- José José: Volcán
- Sophy: Sophy En Concieto
- Alma: Sin Limites....Unlimited
- Joe Bravo: Joe Bravo Is Back
- Los Cadetes De Linares: El Hijo Del Palenque
- Roberto Pulido: ...On Tour
- Juan Gabriel: Espectacular
- Ruben Naranjo Y Los Gamblers: Felicidades
- Oscar D'Leon & Su Salsa Mayor El Oscar De La Salsa
- Fania All Stars: Spanish Fever
- Adalberto Santiago: Adalberto
- Libre: Con Salsa Con Ritmo Vol. 2: Tiene Calidad
- Justo Betancourt & Su Conjunto Borincuba – ¡Presencia!
- Saoco: Macho Mumba
- Charanga '76: Live At Roseland
- Salvador's: La Voz Del Sentimiento
- Los Tigres Del Norte: Numero Ocho
- Nelson Ned: Voz y Corazón
- George Maysonet and Charanga America: George Maysonet and Charanga America
- La Sonora Ponceña: Explorando
- Orquesta Novel: Salud, Dinero Y Amor
- Bobby Rodríguez & La Compañia: Latin From Manhattan
- Renacimiento 74: Frescas Rosas
- Angel Canales: Live
- Wilfrido Vargas & Sus Beduinos: Punto Y Aparte!
- Los Kimbos: Hoy y Mañana
- Larry Harlow Presents Latin Fever: Latin Fever
- Charlie Palmieri: The Heavyweight
- Daniel Magal: Cara De Gitana
- El Jefe Y Su Grupo: Te Parto el Alma
- Eddie Palmieri: Exploration
- Mon Rivera: Forever
- Puerto Rico All-Stars: Los Profesionales
- Lupita D'Alessio: Juro Que Nunca Volveré
- Cepillin: En Un Bosque De La China Vol. V
- Conjunto Impacto: Un Documento Bailable
- Lissette: Sola
- Marco Antonio Muñiz: Salsa A La Manera De Marco Antonio Muñiz
- Héctor Lavoe: Comedia
- Vicente Fernández: A Pesar De Todo
- Chelo: La Inspiration De Jose Alfredo
- Los Cadetes De Linares: Tu Nombre
- Brown Express: Pilares De Cristal
- El Gran Combo de Puerto Rico: El Gran Combo En Las Vegas
- Impacto Crea – Impacto Crea
- Reynaldo Obregon: Sangre De Vino
- Los Sagitarios: Adios Amor
- Sergio and Estíbaliz: Canciones Sudamericanas
- Alvarez Guedes: 7
- Augustin Ramirez: El Parrandero
- Ismael Miranda: Sabor, Sentimiento Y Pueblo
- Ismael Rivera: Esto Si Es Lo Mio
- Louie Ramirez: Louie Ramirez & Sus Amigos
- Tipica 73: Salsa Encendida
- Oscar D'Leon: Oscar D'Leon & Su Salsa Mayor
- Orquesta Broadway: New York City Salsa
- Tommy Olivencia: La Primerisima
- Dimension Latina: Inconquistable
- Conjunto Tipico Criollo: Conjunto Tipico Criollo
- Carlos Miranda: Lo Que Esperaba De
- Demis Roussos: Demis Roussos En Castellano
- Grupo La Amistad: Naila
- Yolanda Del Rio: Yolanda Del Rio
- Dimension Latina – ...Tremenda Dimension!
- Tipica Ideal: Fuera Del Mundo
- Gilberto Monroig: Añoranzas Y Quimera
- Federico Villa: Corridos Con Federico Villa
- Jimmy Edward: My Special Album
- Roberto Roena: El Progreso
- El Grupo La Migra: Celos De Ti
- Pedrito Fernandez: La De La Mochila Azul
- Camilo Sesto: Sentimientos
- Chelo: ¡Las Cuentas Claras!
- Veronica Castro: Sensaciones
- José José: Lo Pasado, Pasado
- Alberto Vázquez: Como No Creer...
- Estela Nuñez: Con Mariachi Para Toda la Vida
- Punto Quatro: Version En Español De Grease
- Los Terricolas: Los Terricolas
- Tommy Olivencia: Sweat Trumpet...Hot Salsa
- Celia Cruz and Johnny Pacheco: Eternos
- Rocío Dúrcal: Canta A Juan Gabriel Volumen 2
- Chalo Campos El Chiclero
- Los Baby's: Sabotaje
- Juan Gabriel – Mis Ojos Tristes
- Manolo Muñoz – Siente El Mariachi
- Rigo Tovar Y Su Costa Azul: Oh Que Gusto De Volverte A Ver
- Cepillin: Cepillin Night Fever
- Ruben Naranjo Y Los Gamblers: Mis Ojos Querendones
- Los Sagitarios: La Carta
- Julio Iglesias: Emociones
- Los Bukis: Me Siento Solo
- Lolita Flores: Espérame
- Pequeña Compañia: Boleros
- Bobby Valentín: La Boda de Ella
- Rolando Ojeda: Siempre
- Los Felinos – Los Felinos
- La Sonora Ponceña La Orquesta De Mi Tierra
- Saoco Original: Curare
- Orchestra Harlow: El Albino Divino
- Los Bravos del Norte de Ramón Ayala: El Soldado Raso
- Johnny Ventura: Presentando A...Mi Nueva Cosecha!
- Jose Domingo Castaño: Motivos
- Régulo Alcocer Y Su Grupo: Cuando Yo Muera
- Juan Torres: Superdiscotheque 3
- Fania All Stars: Live
- Eddie Palmieri: Lucumi, Macumba, Voodoo
- La Salsa Mayor: De Frente & Luchando
- Santo Morales: Boleros, Con Amor
- Braulio: Vivir Sintiendo
- Pablo Abraira: Visiones
- Elio Roca: Elio Roca
- Sophy: Balada Para un Loco
- Ramón Ayala & Los Bravos Del Norte: Mi Piquito De Oro
- Irene Rivas – Irene Rivas
- Rocío Jurado: De Ahora en Adelante
- La Lupe: Apasionada (Passionate)
- Oscar D'Leon: La Critica
- Mazz: Mazz
- Roberto Pulido: Seguiré Mi Camino
- Victor Yturbe: De Vez En Vez...
- Roberto Carlos: Roberto Carlos '78
- Luis "Perico" Ortiz: Super Salsa
- Orquesta Aragon: Ritmo Cha-Onda
- Elio Pacheco: African Fire
- Ray Barretto: Gracias
- Machito: Mucho Macho
- Chayito Valdéz: Chayito Valdéz
- Juan Gabriel: Canta A Juan Gabriel
- Sonora Dinamita: Sonora Dinamita
- Los Potros: Los Potros
- Chelo: Mas José Alfredo En La Voz De... Chelo
- Los Bukis: Los Bukis
- Los 8 De Colombia: Piensa Corazón
- Vicente Fernández: Mi Amigo El Tordillo
- Danny Rivera: Serenata
- Leonardo Paniagua: Leonardo Paniagua
- José Vélez: Seguimos
- Adalberto Santiago: Featuring Popeye El Marino
- Roberto Torres: Presenta A Su Amigo Papaito
- Silvio Rodríguez: Al final de este viaje...
- Chico Buarque: Chico Buarque
- Hernaldo Zúñiga: Cancionero
- Pastor López: Traicionera
- Beth Carvalho: De Pé no Chão
- Irakere: Irakere
- Chabuca Granda: Tarimba negra
- Zé Ramalho: Zé Ramalho
- Maria Bethânia: Álibi
- Alceu Valença: Espelho Cristalino
- Tim Maia: Disco Club
- Caetano Veloso: Muito (Dentro da Estrela Azulada)
- Olivia Byington: Corra o Risco
- Alcione Nazareth: Alerta Geral
- Beto Guedes: Amor de Índio
- Dona Ivone Lara: Samba Minha Verdade, Minha Raiz
- Milton Nascimento: Clube da Esquina 2
- Walter Franco: Respire Fundo

=== Best-selling albums ===
The following is a list of the top 5 best-selling Latin albums of 1978 in the United States divided into the categories of Latin pop and salsa, according to Billboard.

| Category | Rank | Album | Artist |
|---|---|---|---|
| Latin pop | 1 | Espectacular | Juan Gabriel |
| Latin pop | 2 | A Pesar de Todo | Vicente Fernández |
| Latin pop | 3 | Numbero 8 | Los Tigres del Norte |
| Latin pop | 4 | A mis 33 años | Julio Iglesias |
| Latin pop | 5 | Entre amigos | Camilo Sesto |
| Salsa | 1 | Only They Could Have Made This Album | Celia Cruz and Willie Colón |
| Salsa | 2 | Explorando | La Sonora Ponceña |
| Salsa | 3 | Spanish Fever | Fania All-Stars |
| Salsa | 4 | Comedia | Héctor Lavoe |
| Salsa | 5 | Latin From Manhattan | Bobby Rodriguez |

=== Births ===
- February 10 – Don Omar, Puerto Rican reggaeton singer
- February 23 – Residente, Puerto Rican rapper
- April 15 – Luis Fonsi, Puerto Rican pop singer
- September 30 – Juan Magán, Spanish DJ
- December 19 – Wisin, Puerto Rican reggaeton singer

== 1979 ==
=== Events ===
- February 28 – Tito Puente wins the Grammy Award for Best Latin Recording at the 21st Annual Grammy Awards for Homenaje a Beny Moré .
- December 8 – The 8th OTI Festival, held at the Theatre of the Military Academy in Caracas, Venezuela, is won by the song "Cuenta conmigo", written by Chico Novarro and Raúl Parentella, and performed by Daniel Riolobos representing Argentina.

=== Album releases ===
- Irakere: Irakere
- Fania All-Stars: Cross Over
- Airto Moreira: Touching You, Touching Me
- Los Cadetes de Linares: Pescadores de Ensenada
- Los Tigres del Norte: El Tahur
- Los Humildes:Los Humildes En Mexico
- Tito Allen: Untouchable
- Joe Cuba: El Pirata del Caribe
- Jose Mangual Jr. Pa' Bailar Y Gozar
- Yolanda Del Rio: Los Tiene de Adorno
- Mongo Santamaria: Red Hot
- Willie Bobo: Bobo
- Johnny Pacheco and Hector Casanova: Los Amigos
- Ismael Quintana and Ricardo Marrero: Jessica
- Poncho Sanchez: Poncho
- Roberto Jordan: El Sol Se Fue
- Willy Chirino: ... Come Into My Music
- Angela Carrasco: Angela Carrasco
- Fito Giron: Fiebre De Fito Giron
- Lupita D'Alessio: Solo Soy una Mujer
- Estela Nuñez: Por Amores Como Tú
- Julio Iglesias: Todos Los Días, Un Día (soundtrack)
- Los Humildes: En Mexico
- Roberto Torres: El Duro del Guaguanco
- Oscar de Fontana: Nuestros Boleros
- Oscar D' León & Su Orquesta: El Más Grande
- Celia Cruz and La Sonora Ponceña: La Ceiba
- Willie Colón: Solo
- Los Virtuosos: Arrollando
- Puerto Rico All Stars: Tribute To The Messiah
- Dimension Latina: Combinacion Latina No.4
- Angel Canales: El Sentimiento Del Latino En Nueva York
- Marvin Santiago: Fuego a la Jicotea
- Fania All Stars: Cross Over
- Orquesta Novel: Canta y Encanta
- Los Hijos del Rey: New Life
- Tipica 73: En Cuba
- Orchestra Harlow: Rumbambola
- Orquesta La Terrifica: Orquesta La Terrifica
- Sociedad 76: Sociedad '76
- Roberto Pulido & Los Clasicos: El Primo
- Wally González: Las Mujeres y Las Novelas
- Rigo Tovar: Con El Mariachi
- Esteban Jordan: Ahorita
- Nelson Ned: Mi Manera de Amar
- Gilberto Monroig: Interpreta A Bobby Capo
- José María Napoleón: Napoleon
- Vicente Fernández: El Tahur
- Louie Ramirez: Salsa Progresiva
- Julio Castro & Orquesta La Masacre: New Generation Presenta
- Andy Montañez and Pellín Rodríguez: Encuentro Cercano De Dos Grandes
- Eladio Jimenez: Eladio Jimenez
- Pupi Legarreta: El Fugitivo
- Wilfrido Vargas: Poder Musical
- Johnny Pacheco and Daniel Santos Los Distinguidos
- Joan Sebastian: Hasta Que Amanezca
- Los Freddy's: Los Freddy's
- Los Felinos: Morena Tenias Que Ser
- Los Bravos del Norte de Ramón Ayala: Puñalada Trapera
- Manoella Torres: Que Me Perdone Tu Señora
- José Luís Rodríguez: Por Si Volvieras
- Pete "El Conde" Rodriguez: Soy La Ley
- Yambú: Introducing Jesus Nolasco
- Roberto Torres: Presenta... La Charanga Casino
- Willie Rosario: El Rey del Ritmo
- Tata Vasquez And His Orchestra: Ecstasy
- Pedrito Fernández: Pedrito Fernández
- Emmanuel: Al Final...
- Sophy: En Mexico
- Elio Roca: En Mexico
- Roberto Anglero: Tierra Negra
- José Augusto – Jose Augusto
- Roberto Torres: Roberto Torres Presenta A Su Amigo Papaito
- Hector Lavoe, Yomo Toro, and Daniel Santos – Feliz Navidad
- Chelo: Ya Me Voy
- Chayito Valdez: La Triunfadora Del Primer Festival de la Canción
- Renacimiento 74: Aaaapa Viajecito
- Los Tam Y Tex: Plegaria Petrolera
- Ramón Ayala y Los Bravos Del Norte: Bailamos Tia
- Johnny Ventura En Su Décimoquinto Aniversario
- Camilo Sesto: Horas De Amor
- Anthony Rios: Vivencias
- Eladio Romero Santos: La Viuda
- El Gran Combo de Puerto Rico: ¡Aquí No Se Sienta Nadie!
- Oscar D'León & Su Orquesta: ...Llegó...Actuó...Y...Triunfó..!
- Tito Puente: Homenaje A Beny Vol. 2
- Rigo Tovar: Reflexiona
- Manoella Torres: Se Te Fue Viva La Paloma
- Caetano Veloso: Cinema Transcendental
- Angela Ro Ro: Angela Ro Ro
- Eva Ayllón: Esta noche...
- Serú Girán: La grasa de las capitales
- Virulo: Génesis según Virulo
- Gilberto Gil: Realce
- Rita Lee: Rita Lee
- Zé Ramalho: A Peleja do Diabo com o Dono do Céu
- Cátia de França: 20 Palavras ao redor do Sol
- Hermeto Pascoal: Zabumbê-bum-á
- Boca Livre: Boca Livre
- Hermeto Pascoal: Ao Vivo (Montreux Jazz)
- Gal Costa: Gal Tropical
- Geraldo Azevedo: Bicho de 7 Cabeças
- Lô Borges: 'A Via-Láctea
- Maria Bethânia: Mel
- Moraes Moreira: Lá Vem o Brasil Descendo a Ladeira
- Amelinha: Frevo Mulher

=== Best-selling albums ===
The following is a list of the top 5 best-selling Latin albums of 1979 in the United States divided into the categories of Latin pop and salsa, according to Billboard.

| Category | Rank | Album | Artist |
|---|---|---|---|
| Latin pop | 1 | A Pesar de Todo | Vicente Fernández |
| Latin pop | 2 | Emociones | Julio Iglesias |
| Latin pop | 3 | Sentimientos | Camilo Sesto |
| Latin pop | 4 | La de La Monchila Azul | Pedrito Fernández |
| Latin pop | 5 | Canta a Juan Gabriel | Rocío Dúrcal |
| Salsa | 1 | Siembra | Willie Colón and Rubén Blades |
| Salsa | 2 | Eternos | Celia Cruz and Johnny Pacheco |
| Salsa | 3 | Comedia | Héctor Lavoe |
| Salsa | 4 | Oscar D'Leon Y Su Salsa Mayor | Oscar D'Leon |
| Salsa | 5 | Red Hot | Mongo Santamaria |

=== Births ===
- June 5 – David Bisbal, Spanish pop singer
- October 15 – Jaci Velasquez, American performer of Christian and Latin pop music

=== Deaths ===
- March 23 – Antonio Brosa, Spanish violinist, 84

== See also ==
- 1970s in music
