= Miguel Poventud =

Puerto Rican musician

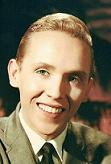
- "El Niño Prodigio de Guayama"

Background information
- Also known as: "Miguelito"
- Born: August 4, 1942; Guayama, Puerto Rico
- Died: March 3, 1983 (aged 40) New York City, New York
- Genres: Boleros
- Occupations: Musician, singer, actor and composer of Boleros
- Instrument: Guitar
- Labels: Spanoramic records RCA (Mexico); Orfeon (International releases)

Miguel Poventud a.k.a. "El Niño Prodigio de Guayama" and "Miguelito" (August 4, 1942 – March 3, 1983), was a Puerto Rican musician, singer, actor and composer of Boleros. An acclaimed artist well known internationally; Best Latin Artist Billboard 1977 for "Tu Mente". Among the entertainers who have interpreted his musical compositions are Marco Antonio Muniz, Héctor Lavoe and Daniel Santos.

== Early years ==
Poventud was born in Guayama, Puerto Rico, to Francisco Poventud, a law enforcement officer in the San Juan Police Department, and Concepción Aponte, a seamstress. A descendant of Carlos Armstrong and Eulalia Pou, Poventud was the youngest of five siblings. From the age of five Poventud looked forward to trips to the town Plaza accompanied by his mother, dressed in clothes that she herself had sewn. While he was a student at the Escuela Parada Guamani, he suffered a spinal cord injury caused by a biking accident and was hospitalized for two years, which left him immobile at the age of 10. His mother was stricken by TB and died shortly after he was discharged from the hospital.

When Poventud's father gave him a guitar, he learned music with many teachers but polished his skills in Mexico by age 12 alongside Juan Neri from the famous Trio named "Los Tres Aces". At age 9, he began playing left handed and later right handed. At times he could play the guitar strings upside down performing in his hometown of Guayama, winning awards, and singing before large audiences at the local radio station WHOM. He became known as El Niño Prodigio de Guayama (The Child Prodigy of Guayama). After his mother's death, Poventud's father remarried. The young boy resented this, and resented his father's opposition to his musical career.

== Musical career ==
Victor Alonso of Spanoramic records became interested in Poventud's musical work. Before his mother died, Alonso promised her that he would give Poventud a career opportunity. He made Poventud an offer that included the recording of Poventud's first record album titled Pobre Huerfanito (Poor Little Orphan) in New York City. At this point, Poventud's father again resisted the boy's musical career, and his older brother Carlos argued with the father about Miguelito's future. After this argument, Carlos took young Poventud to live with him in New York City, and became his legal guardian.

=== New York City ===
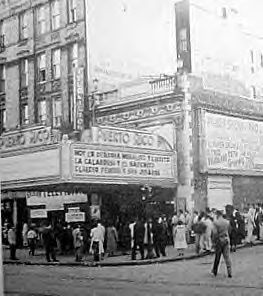
Teatro Puerto Rico in the 1950s

In New York, Poventud continued his primary and secondary education at P.S. 93 Elementary School, then at Joan of Arc High School.

Poventud wrote his first composition at age 14 titled Ya No Soy Un Niño. (I'm Not a Child Anymore). His primary inspirations were his deceased mother, his new reality in New York, a growing romanticism, and the melancholy of diaspora - a nostalgia for the island and the people that he'd left behind. In 1956, still at the age of 14, Poventud was invited to sing in the wedding of Grace Kelly and Rainier III, Prince of Monaco.

Poventud made his professional debut in El Teatro Puerto Rico, playing Rock and Roll and special comedic performances with Tin Tan & Yomo Toro: Soy un Huerfanito (Calling attention to the Puerto Rican Diaspora), De Que Me Sirve la Vida (What's the Use of Living), and Hechame a Mi la Culpa (Blame Me For Whatever Happens). Poventud continued to make further presentations at the theater with Yomo Toro y su Conjunto playing Rock 'n Roll in English, and singing Boleros in Spanish. His also sang Rock 'n Roll songs such as "Prometo Recordarte" (I Promise to Remember You). He made two appearances in a local New York television show, in which he sang "De Boca a Boca" (Kiss to Kiss) and several other Rock 'n Roll numbers.

Poventud participated in a comedy sketch with Mexican comedian Tin Tan and was invited by the comedian to join his act in Mexico, which he did, and there they recorded an album based on their act. While in Mexico, he appeared and sang in Around the World in 80 Days, a movie based on a Jules Verne novel. Also in Mexico, he participated in five recordings with the musical trio El Trio Los Panchos. In 1961, he returned to New York and married his high school sweetheart Norma Iris Guzman, with whom he had two children.

In 1964, Poventud filled in for Johnny Albino as a CBS musician with El Trio Los Panchos, when Albino could not sing because of a voice ailment. This occurred during the recording of "More Amor" with Eydie Gorme. Poventud went on to record the album Los Panchos by Special Request, a compilation of love songs recorded in English for CBS, with Albino. He also, participated as the main guitarist and voice accompaniment in the recording of "Grandes Exitos de Johnny Albino con Los Panchos" with Albino. In 1965 the light heavyweight boxing champion of the world, a Puerto Rican named José "Chegui" Torres, went to see one of Poventud's performances at Mexico's El Teatro Lirico and they became friends. Eventually they were both invited to appear on The Ed Sullivan Show, where Torres sang "Un Poco Mas" accompanied by Poventud and his guitar.

Poventud returned to New York, attended Boricua College in the Bronx, and became politically involved in the Puerto Rican independence movement around this time. Together with his trio the Miguel Poventud y Su Trío, succeeded as a bolerista. He tried his hand at singing Salsa and Ballads in the late sixties and early seventies, working with various "guitar trios" throughout New York. In 1974 he agreed to participate in the album The Mambo Boys Classics together with Al Abreu (sax), Manny Duran (trumpet), Manny Corchado (percussion), Tito Puente (timbales), Ozzie Torrens (conga), Charlie Palmieri (piano) and Louie Ramirez (vibes). Louie Ramirez and Chico Mendoza arranged the Salsa session, while Hector Garrido arranged the ballads. Poventud and Bobby Capó sang "Tan Felices". Poventud also recorded with Capo in "El Bardo" and with Tito Puente in the Al Ladito Tuyo albums.

=== Che Guevara Speaks ===
In 1975, Poventud and José Glóro provided the musical background for Che Guevara Speaks, a recording of an interview with Ernesto "Che" Guevarra before Guevara was sent to Bolivia. Poventud had an accident two days before the recording and showed up with and injured thumb that was held in place with a metal pin and stitches. Despite this injury, Poventud played an accordion for the occasion. In 1976, Poventud made the arrangements and was the first guitarist in Pepe and Flora's album En La Lucha. That same year, he also participated in the protests in favor of Puerto Rican independence in front of the United Nations Building in New York.

In 1978 Gilberto Monroig, a member of Tito Puente's Orchestra, and Poventud recorded various songs. Among them were Que Chevere and Malcriada. Que Chevere was often played on Radio WADO.

=== Niegalo ===
Poventud's interpretation of the song Niegalo (Deny it) resulted he being invited to appear at Mexico's El Teatro Lirico. The song Niegalo was also interpreted by Chago Alvarado in Peru. In 1978, Poventud also recorded Alvarado's Me Cansó tu Historia (I'm Tired of your Story). Another song that received international recognition was Tite Curet Alonso's Tu Mente (Your Mind) interpreted by Poventud. Tu Mente won the Billboard Award for Best Latin Artist in 1977.

Another Puerto Rican singer, Daniel Santos, recorded Poventud's Si Yo Fuera Millonario (If I Were a Millionaire). The jibaro song, Joven Contra Viejo (Young Against Old) featured Héctor Lavoe and Daniel Santos settling their age-based differences on-stage, but not without a heavy dose of humor and (yet again) Yomo Toro's cuatro music as a backdrop. It included a song from Poventud Una Pena en La Navidad (A Pain in Christmas).

== Later years ==
Poventud lived in TriBeCa, a neighborhood in lower Manhattan, New York. During his last years he performed at the Chibcha Restaurant in Queens. One of his songs, Eres todo para Mi was released in 1983. He died on March 3, 1983, at St. Vincent's Hospital in New York and was buried in Guayama, the place of his birth. He is survived by his wife Norma Iris Guzman and his daughters Kaluska and Yolanda Poventud.

== Selected compositions ==
External audio
- You may listen to Miguel Poventud and his group Los Menores sing Mi Amada Diana on YouTube (Spanish)
- and Prometo Recordarte (I Promise To Remember you) on YouTube.

Among Poventud's many musical compositions, which can be found in libraries, are the following:

- Che Guevara Speaks - (Poventud provided the musical background)- 2 editions published between 1973 and re-leased in 2000 in Spanish and held by 17 libraries worldwide.
- Bailemos Twist - Held by 2 libraries worldwide
- Mi Amada Diana - Held by 2 libraries worldwide
- No me Importa tu Suerte - Held by 1 library worldwide
- Feliz Navidad - Held by 1 library worldwide
- Agonias de Amor - Held by 1 library worldwide

Compositions with Words and Music by Miguel Poventud 1970

- Esto Sigue and Chevere - Recorded by Gilberto Monroig
- Voy a Combiar Mi Corazon - Recorded by Marco Antonio Muñiz
- Al Fin Del Mundo; Recordar Es Morir; Quien and Flor - Recorded by Pepe y Flora
- No Me Importa Ya Tu Suerte and Devuelveme Mis Cosas

1975

- Mami Donde Esta Papi
- Otra Navidad Sin Ti and En La Navidad Una Pena-Recorded by Héctor Lavoe
- Fuiquiti, La Casa Nuestra and Tradicion Eterna (new title Salve Mi Pueblo)-Recorded by Yomo Toro

Author, Music and Lyrics

- Devuelveme Mis Cosas
- El Ultimo Beso - (co-written with Francisco De La Barrera Gonzalez)
- Que Cosa Te Hice Yo - (co-written with Francisco De La Barrera Gonzalez)
- Voy a Cambiar mi Corazon
- Yo Siento Quererte

Recordings by Poventud

- Tin Tan y Miguelito Poventud, and Pobre Huerfanito, Canta Miguel Poventud-Recorded at Spanoramic Recordings, New York
- Miguel Poventud, Agonias de Amor - Recorded at RCA Victor of Mexico
- Ven at Industrias Electronicas Y Musicales Peruanas S.A.
- De Paranda - Recorded at Blank Tapes NYC Mfd.
- Miguelito Poventud, Tu Mente; Miguelito Poventud, Tu Mente and El Bardo-Recorded at Orfeon in Mexico
- Miguel Poventud, Al Ladito Tuyo - Recorded at Milly Latino
- Miguel Poventud, Eres Todo En mi - Recorded at WS Latino
- Have a Good Time - Recorded at Mapa records
- De Parranda - Recorded at Orfeon in NYC

In 1997, Yomo Toro re-released Fuikiti and Una Pena en la Navidad with original compositions by Miguel Poventud in an album titled Celebremos Navidad (Let us Celebrate Christmas), produced by Rachel Faro and Sammy Figueroa. The album won the "Indie Award Best Latin Album" and the "Paoli Prize Best Christmas Album" award. In 2009, Toro once more released the album Fuikiti, which included Poventud's compositions Esta Navidad (This Christmas); Otra Navidad Sin Ti (Another Christmas Without You); Despierta, Despierta (Wake Up, Wake Up); and Fuikiti.

== See also ==
- List of Puerto Rican songwriters
- List of Puerto Ricans
