= Obsesión (Pedro Flores song) =

"Obsesión" is a 1935 Spanish-language bolero song by Puerto Rican songwriter Pedro Flores. The song is one of Flores' best known has been recorded by many artists. Flores was resident in New York where his Cuarteto Flores, including Panchito Riset and Daniel Santos, made his boleros popular.

== Lyrics ==
The lyrics of the song have been referenced many times in literature since the song's early success in the 1940s. The song opens with:

Por alto que esté el cielo en el mundo, por hondo que sea el mar profundo, no habrá una barrera en el mundo que mi amor profundo no pueda romper.

Among the following verses a frequently cited phrase is "Amor es el pan de la vida, amor es la copa divina, (English: "Love is the bread of life, love is the divine cup") amor es un algo sin nombre que obsesiona a un hombre por una mujer. These and other lyrics are referenced in a number of modern Spanish literary works. The lyrics of the bolero form the key to the obsession in the novel Las batallas en el desierto, by José Emilio Pacheco (1948) filmed as es:Mariana, Mariana (1987) by Mexican director Alberto Isaac.

== Versions ==
The song has been covered by artists including:

- Pedro Vargas (sung as a duet with Beny Moré)
- Javier Solis
- es:Ceferino Nieto single
- Iran Eory single 1980
- es:Jochy Hernández single 1987
- Lucho Gatica EP
- Julio Iglesias, on America (Julio Iglesias album) 1976
- Isaac Delgado on La Primera Noche 1994
- Spanish Harlem Orchestra on album Un Gran Dia en el Barrio 2002
