= Anthony Ríos =

Dominican singer, actor, and comedian (1950–2019)

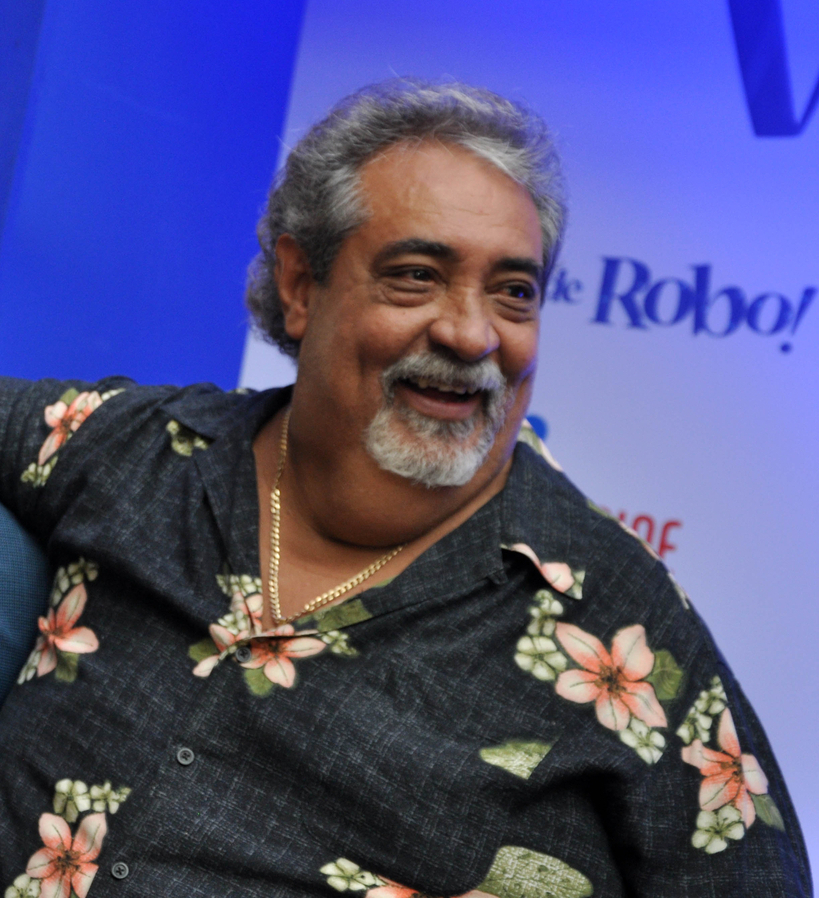

Froilán Antonio Rodríguez Jiménez (17 July 1950 – 4 March 2019), was a Dominican singer songwriter of ballad and merengue, actor and comedian. He was born in the village of Las Cañitas, in the municipality of Sabana de la Mar, on July 17, 1950. As a child he moved to Hato Mayor del Rey, where he worked as a shoeshine boy, a job he performed singing, and during the Christmas festivities he sang Christmas carols from house to house. His voice attracted a promoter who started him in the music industry.

Ríos had 26 children (18 daughters and 8 sons) with 24 women. In the 1980s he had an affair with the Puerto Rican artist Yolandita Monge, shortly after the birth of Noelia, whom he raised for a while as a stepdaughter.

Anthony became independent in his musical project, became a soloist and popularized songs such as "Madam sadness", "If you understood", "I am at your command", "Fatality", "Die of love", "Golden cage", among others all of his authorship.

He also wrote songs for singers such as Fernando Villalona, Sophy, Yolandita Monge, Lissette, Pastor López, Fernando Allende and others.

For 1993 he produced his nineteenth album titled Boleros como ayer, and with this he became part of the record label Juan y Nelson Records. In 1996 he recorded again with Kubaney his twentieth album, with the name "En bachatas", later he debuted in the cinema with his participation in the movie Nueva yol III.

The Congress of the Dominican Republic approved at the end of 2018 to exalt the figure of Rios, however, this recognition was never executed.

Due to his obesity situation, he underwent an open heart surgery, in which a coronary bypass was performed. Due to arrhythmia, a defibrillator pacemaker was installed. He died on March 4, 2019, due to heart problems. The municipality of Hato Mayor del Rey municipality declared 3 days of official mourning.
