= Gerardo Reyes (actor) =

Mexican actor in westerns and singer of Regional Mexican music

Gerardo Reyes (Balsas, Guerrero, March 25, 1935 – Cuernavaca, Morelos, Mexico, February 25, 2015) was a Mexican actor in westerns and singer of Regional Mexican music. He was author of over 600 songs. Reyes featured in over 80 westerns including 'Sin fortuna', 'Libro abierto', 'Cargando con mi cruz', 'Jacinto el tullido', 'El asesino', 'El rey de los caminos', 'Pobre Bohemio', 'Se lo dejo a Dios', 'El preso número nueve', among others.
