= Walter Franco =

Brazilian singer and composer (1945–2019)

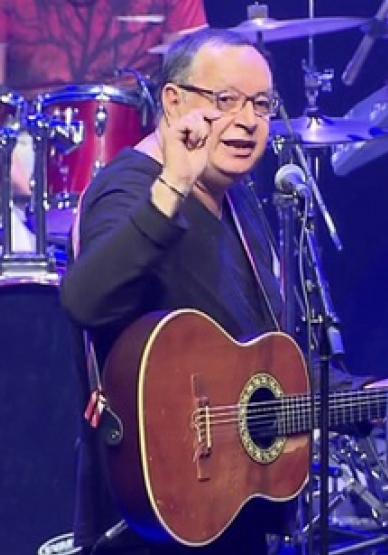

Background information
- Born: 6 January 1945; São Paulo, Brazil
- Died: 24 October 2019 (aged 74) São Paulo, Brazil
- Genres: Avant-garde, experimental rock, MPB
- Occupations: Singer-songwriter, musician, producer
- Instruments: Vocals, guitar
- Years active: 1971–2018
- Labels: Continental, Epic/CBS, PolyGram, YBrazil

Walter Franco (6 January 1945 – 24 October 2019) was a Brazilian singer and composer. In 1998 he contributed to the Rosa Passos album Especial Tom Jobim. His 1975 album Revolver was No. 50 on Rolling Stone's list of the Top 100 Brazilian albums.

Franco died on 24 October 2019 after spending two weeks in hospital following a stroke. He was 74.

== Discography ==
- 1973: Ou Não
- 1975: Revolver
- 1978: Respire Fundo
- 1980: Vela Aberta
- 1982: Walter Franco
- 2001: Tutano
