= Gilberto Monroig =

Puerto Rican musician

Background information
- Born: July 2, 1930; San Juan, Puerto Rico
- Died: May 3, 1996 (aged 65); Santurce, Puerto Rico
- Genres: Boleros
- Occupation(s): Musician and singer
- Instrument: Guitar

Gilberto Monroig (July 2, 1930 – May 3, 1996) was a Puerto Rican guitarist, and singer of boleros.

== Early years ==
Monroig's parents moved from the countryside to the city in search of a better way of life and settled in the Villa Palmera sector of Santurce, a section of San Juan where the musical sounds of the bomba and plena and of the tango filled the air. Monroig was born in Santurce, where he received his primary and secondary education. He later moved to New York City and earned his high school equivalent diploma.

When he was ten years old, he would imitate his favorite singer, the famed Argentine singer of tangos, Carlos Gardel. His father once gave his brother, Luis a guitar which Monroig learned to play better than his brother - often resulting in a fight over the instrument. Finally, Monroig's father decided that it would be best if he bought him one also.

== Professional singer ==
External audio
- You may listen to Gilberto Monroig's "Ya No Me Queda Nada" on YouTube.

In 1943, at age 13, he joined a group called "Taone" and a year later joined another band by the name of "Maravilla". However, it was when the "Super Orchestra Tropicana" directed by Rafael Elvira hired him that he received his first big break as a professional singer. In 1948, Pete Rivera invited Monroig to sing for his band in the inauguration of the Caribe Hilton Hotel in San Juan. Pete soon left the island and headed for New York, where he organized another band. He joined Pete in New York, where he began to gain fame as a bolero singer. During his years in New York, he played for various bands and traveled to the Dominican Republic and Curaçao.

In the early 1950s, Monroig joined Tito Puente's Orchestra and recorded various songs. Among them was "Malcriada" which became a "hit". A favorite in New York played on Radio WADO was the hit single of a sexy bolero "Que Chevere" by singer/composer Miguel Poventud. He would return to Puerto Rico to make many other instant "hits" with the songs "Mujer" (Women) and "Duerme, Margarita" (Sleep, Margarita). He also recorded some songs by composers Pedro Flores and Rafael Hernández. He won his first Gold Record Award in 1959, with "Egoismo".

== Later years ==
Monroig returned to New York and in 1964, he won his second Gold Record Award with "Simplemente Una Ilusión" (Simply an Illusion). He sang for various bands including Tito Puente's and traveled throughout the United States and Latin-America. He also made many television presentations in Puerto Rico.

=== Personal life and death ===
Monroig had two sons and one daughter from two marriages. They are Gilberto Jr., Glenn (who followed in his footsteps) and Linda.

Gilberto Monroig died on May 3, 1996, in Santurce. He was laid to rest in Santa Maria Magdalena de Pazzis Cemetery, close to the remains of singers Pedro Flores, Daniel Santos and Rafael Hernández.

== Legacy ==
Puerto Rico has honored his memory by naming an avenue in San Juan after him. In 2002, he was inducted into the International Latin Music Hall of Fame.

== See also ==
- List of Puerto Ricans
- French immigration to Puerto Rico
