= Bobby Paunetto =

American vibraphonist and composer

Bobby "Vince" Paunetto (June 22, 1944 – August 10, 2010) was a vibraphonist and composer associated to Latin jazz and salsa. He did not start on vibraphone until age 17, but went on to befriend Cal Tjader and study at the Berklee College of Music from 1969 to 1973. He had at least three albums by 1976, and several other projects engineered and co-produced by his friend, Fred Weinberg. One of his albums "Paunetto's Point" became one of the first "Quadraphonic" (Surround sound) albums. Before becoming ill. In 1979 he was diagnosed with multiple sclerosis. Although he continued to compose after that his vibraphone career essentially ended after 1981. Fred Ho referred to him, in his prime, as a leading innovator in fusing salsa music and jazz alongside Eddie Palmieri.
