= America (Julio Iglesias album) =

Studio album by Julio Iglesias
- Released: 1976
- Genre: Latin pop
- Label: Alhambra

Julio Iglesias chronology
| El amor (1975) | America (1976) | Ein Weihnachtsabend Mit Julio Iglesias (1976) |

America is 1976 album by Julio Iglesias. It was released on the Alhambra label. In December 1976, it was No. 2 on the Billboard chart in New York.

== Track listing ==
| No. | Title | Writer(s) | Length |
|---|---|---|---|
| 1. | "Caminito" | Juan de Dios Filiberto; Gabino Coria Peñaloza | 3:30 |
| 2. | "Recuerdos de Ypacarai" | Zulema de Mirkin; Demetrio Ortíz | 3:57 |
| 3. | "Historia de un Amor" | Carlos Eleta Almarán | 3:18 |
| 4. | "Obsesion" | Pedro Flores | 2:22 |
| 5. | "Sombras" | Carlos Brito | 3:30 |
| 6. | "Mañana de carnival" | Luiz Bonfá; Antônio Maria | 3:20 |
| 7. | "Jurame" | María Grever | 4:07 |
| 8. | "Guantanamera" | J. Fernández; H. Angulo; P. Seeger; José Martí | 3:50 |
| 9. | "Vaya Con Dios" | Larry Russell; Buddy Pepper; Inez James | 3:04 |
| 10. | "Moliendo Café" | Hugo Blanco (credited to José Manzo Perroni) | 3:38 |
| 11. | "Ay, ay, ay" | Osmán Pérez Freire | 2:45 |
| 12. | "Alma Llanera" | Pedro Elías Gutierrez | 2:38 |

== Charts ==
=== Weekly charts ===
Weekly chart performance for America
| Chart (1976–1983) | Peak position |
|---|---|
| Argentine Albums (CAPIF) | 1 |
| Israeli Albums (IBA) | 1 |
| Italian Albums (AFI) | 19 |
| Japanese Albums (Cassettes) (Oricon) | 8 |
| Japanese Albums (LPs) (Oricon) | 21 |
| Spanish Albums (AFYVE) | 11 |

=== Year-end charts ===
Year-end chart performance for America
| Chart (1977) | Position |
|---|---|
| Italian Albums (AFI) | 70 |
| US Latin Pop National (Billboard) | 1 |

== Certifications and sales ==
| Region | Certification | Certified units/sales |
|---|---|---|
| Argentina (CAPIF) | Gold | 200,000 |
| Japan | — | 123,890 |

== Sources and external links ==
- Julio Iglesias Discography
