= Yolanda del Río =

Mexican singer and actress

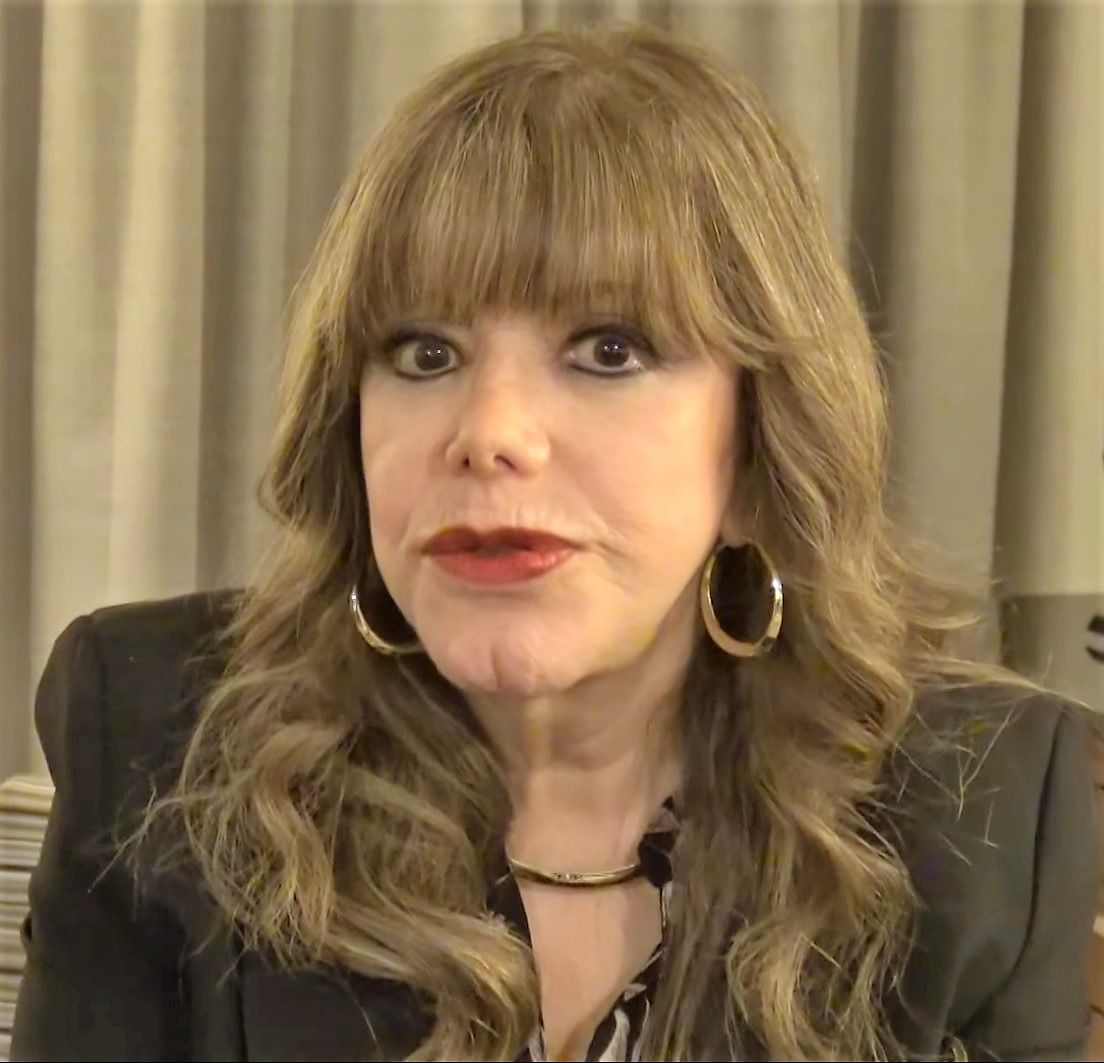
Yolanda del Rio interviewed by Dulce Osuna in 2016

Yolanda del Río (born Yolanda Jaen López on May 27, 1955, in Ixmiquilpan, Hidalgo) is a Mexican film actress and ranchera singer. Some of her best-known films are Caminos de Michoacán (1979) and La India blanca (1982).

Born the youngest daughter of 4 children, she was inspired at a young age by famous golden age Ranchera singers Lola Beltrán, Lucha Villa, or Amalia Mendoza played on the radio. Yolanda began voice training at a very early age to become a singer and recorded. With her trademark melancholic wailing style, she would eventually become one of the most prominent Ranchera singers of the 1970s and 1980s. Her songs "Valgame Dios" and "Una Intrusa" ranked on the Billboard Latin charts.

== Partial discography ==
- La hija del nadie, Arcano Records, division of RCA Records (1972), DKL1-3202
