= El amor (Julio Iglesias album) =

Studio album by Julio Iglesias
- Released: 1975
- Genre: Latin pop
- Label: Columbia

Julio Iglesias chronology
A México (1975)	El amor (1975)	América (1976)

Singles from El amor
- 1. "A veces tú, a veces yo" Released: 1975; 2. "Abrázame" Released: 1975; 3. "Quiero" Released: 1975; 4. "El amor" Released: 1975

El amor (The love) is a 1975 album by Spanish singer Julio Iglesias. It was released on the Alhambra label. It received Diamond certification in Argentina.

== Track listing ==
No.	Title	Length
1.	"Abrázame"	3:29
2.	"A veces tú, a veces yo"	2:54
3.	"Tema de amor (Love's Theme)"	3:09
4.	"Quién"	3:40
5.	"Cuidado amor"	3:58
6.	"Quiero"	2:48
7.	"El amor"	2:49
8.	"Mi dulce Señor (My Sweet Lord)"	3:36
9.	"Déjala"	2:45
10.	"Candilejas"	4:10

== Charts ==
=== Weekly charts ===
Weekly chart performance for El Amor
Chart (1976–1982)	Peak position
Argentine Albums (CAPIF)	1
Dutch Albums (Album Top 100)	13
Japanese Albums CT (Oricon)	79
Japanese Albums LP (Oricon)	72
Spanish Albums (AFYVE)	4

=== Year-end charts ===
Year-end chart performance for El Amor
Chart (1976)	Position
Spanish Albums (AFYVE)	8

Chart (1977)	Position
US Latin Pop National (Billboard)	5

== Certifications and sales ==
Region	Certification	Certified units/sales
Argentina (CAPIF)	Diamond	678,285
Greece (IFPI Greece)	Gold	50,000
Japan	—	8,520

== See also ==
- List of diamond-certified albums in Argentina

== Sources and external links ==
- Julio Iglesias Discography
