= A México =

Studio album by Julio Iglesias
- Released: 1975
- Genre: Latin pop
- Label: Columbia, Alhambra
- Producer: Rafael Ferro

Julio Iglesias chronology
Ich schick' dir eine weiße Wolke (1974)	A México (1975)	El amor (1975)

Singles from A México
- 1. "Cucurrucucú paloma" Released: 1975

A México (To Mexico) is a 1975 album by Julio Iglesias. It was released on the Alhambra label.

== Track listing ==
No.	Title	Writer(s)	Length
1.	"Cucurrucucú paloma"	Tomas Mendez	3:28
2.	"No me amenaces"	Jose Alfredo Jimenez	3:12
3.	"Ella"	Jimenez	3:24
4.	"Cuando vivas conmigo"	Jimenez	2:37
5.	"Noche de ronda"	Maria Teresa Lara	3:58
6.	"Solamente una vez"	Agustin Lara	3:37
7.	"Amanecí en tus brazos"	Jimenez	3:19
8.	"Corazón, corazón"	Jimenez	3:44
9.	"De un mundo raro"	Jimenez	3:12
10.	"María Bonita"	A. Lara	3:00

== Certifications and sales ==
Region	Certification	Certified units/sales
Argentina	—	400,000
Colombia	—	250,000
