= Marco Antonio Muñiz =

Mexican singer

Marco Antonio Muñiz Vega (born 3 March 1933, Guadalajara, Jalisco, Mexico) is a Mexican singer, musician and actor, specialized in the musical genre of bolero. Known across Latin America, he also acted in the 1965 film Sinful (Spanish: El Pecador).

== Early life and career ==
Muñiz was born in Guadalajara, Jalisco. From an early age, he showed musical talent. He first acquired notoriety in the 50s as part of the trio Los Tres Aces, with whom he recorded many hits until he decided to embark on a solo career in 1960.

Muñiz's first album was a tribute to singers of other eras. It was titled "Aquellas Canciones!" ("Those Songs!"), and it was released in 1956. That was the first of close to 80 albums, all of which he recorded under the BMG or RCA Internacional labels.

== Career in the 60s ==
In 1965, he began an uninterrupted streak of years traveling to Puerto Rico's Caribe Hilton Hotel in San Juan around Christmas, to offer concerts there. (At one time, Muñiz claimed he was such a regular at the hotel that he could figure his way out of any of the hotel's suites and out of the facility blindfolded). This lasted close to thirty years. Muñiz has since returned for yearly shows at the Caribe Hilton, this time around Mother's Day.

== Releases ==
Among the albums recorded by Muñiz are Marco Antonio Muñiz con Los Trovadores del Caribe which was his fourth album, Mi Novia es Guadalajara! (Guadalajara is my Girlfriend!), which was his fifth, Salsa a la Manera de... (Salsa, Marco Antonio's Way..., which represented his first foray into the Salsa rhythm), 1991's Mi Borinquén Querido (My Dear Borinquen, where he paid homage to Puerto Rican folklore music), a 1993 dedication to Pedro Infante, and a 1997 album and CD which was dedicated to José Alfredo Jiménez.

His extensive solo career includes top 40 hit chart singles across Latin America such as "Voy a Cambiar Mi Corazón" by singer/composer Miguel Poventud. He is an international artist with fans in Brazil and Poland.

== Personal life ==
In 1978, Muñiz married Jessica Munguia de Muñiz. He has seven children, 5 sons and 2 daughters.
