= Meñique =

Panamanian singer (1933–2021)

- Birth name: Miguel Ángel Barcasnegras
- Also known as: "El Gran Meñique" "El Sonero Añejo"
- Born: 30 December 1933 Panama City, Panama
- Died: 28 November 2021 (aged 87) Miami, Florida, U.S.
- Genres: Salsa
- Years active: 1948–2021

Miguel Ángel Barcasnegras (30 December 1933 – 28 November 2021), known professionally as Meñique, was a Panamanian singer and songwriter.

== Discography ==
=== Solo ===
- 1972: Meñique
- 1974: Soy Hijo de Chango
- 1975: Meñique Presenta Tropical de Chicago
- 1983: Meñique En Blanco y Negro
- 2004: Meñique, Sonero Añejo: 55 Años Trayectoria Músical
- 2008: Meñique, Salsa y Bembe
- 2013: El Gran Meñique y Chamaco Rivera Presentan Iván Marrero y su Charanga
- 2015: Bolerisimo
