= Elio Roca =

Argentine actor (1943–2021)

Roberto Orlando Bracone Macceialli (3 August 1943 – 19 December 2021), better known as Elio Roca was an Argentine singer.

Roca was born in Presidencia Roque Sáenz Peña, Chaco Province, Argentina on 3 August 1943. He released his debut album, Bella, bionda, Carina in 1965. He was best known for the singles "Como deseo ser tu amor", "Te necesito tanto amor", "Yo quiero dibujarte". Elio Roca also appeared in several Argentine films such as Vamos a soñar por el amor (1971), Contigo y aquí (1974), Love in Flight (1967), Te necesito tanto, amor (1976), and La colimba no es la guerra (1972). Roca died on 19 December 2021, at the age of 78.
