= Realce =

Studio album by Gilberto Gil
- Released: August 1979
- Recorded: West Hollywood Recording Studios, West Hollywood, California
- Genre: MPB
- Length: 38:16
- Label: Warner Bros.

Gilberto Gil chronology
Nightingale (1979)	Realce (1979)	Brasil (1981)

Professional ratings
Review scores
Source	Rating
Allmusic	3/5 stars

Realce (transl. Highlight) is a studio album released by Brazilian singer Gilberto Gil in 1979. It is the last album of Gil's "Re" trilogy, the others being Refazenda (1974) and Refavela (1976).

== Track listing ==
Tracks 1–9 appear on the original 1979 release. Tracks 10–16 are included with the 2003 CD reissue. All tracks by Gilberto Gil except when it noted.

1. Realce
2. Sarará Miolo
3. Superhomem, a canção
4. Tradição
5. Marina (Dorival Caymmi)
6. Rebento
7. Toda Menina Baiana
8. Logunedé
9. Não Chore Mais (No Woman, No Cry) (Gilberto Gil, Vincent Ford)
10. Macapá
11. Acertei no Milhar
12. Senhor Delegado
13. Escurinho
14. Minha Nega na Janela
15. A Situação do Escurinho
16. Samba Rubro-Negro (O Mais Querido)
