= Cassiano (singer) =

Brazilian singer and composer (1943–2021)

- Born: Genival Cassiano dos Santos; September 16, 1943; Campina Grande, Paraíba, Brazil
- Died: May 7, 2021 (aged 77) Rio de Janeiro, Brazil
- Genres: Funk; soul
- Formerly of: Sandra de Sá; Ed Motta; Djavan; Luiz Melodia; Marisa Monte

Genival Cassiano dos Santos (September 16, 1943 – May 7, 2021), best known only as Cassiano, was a Brazilian singer, songwriter and guitarist.

He is recognized, along with Tim Maia and Hyldon, as one of the three great precursors of the establishment of an American funk and soul music influence in Brazilian popular music.

His career, however, was compromised by a serious respiratory problem in the late 1970s, in which he lost part of his lungs. Besides the difficulty of performing as a singer, Cassiano's relationship with the recording industry deteriorated even further, which eventually led to the composer's total reclusion over the last three decades of his life.

Throughout his musical career, the singer recorded four studio LPs, three of which - "Imagem e som", "Apresentamos nosso Cassiano" and "Cuban soul - 14 kilates" - were released in the 1970s. His latest work, "Cedo ou Tarde", was released in the early 1990s. Among his greatest commercial successes are "A Lua e Eu" and "Coleção", in his own voice, "Primavera (Vai Chuva)" and "Eu Amo Você", interpreted by Tim Maia.

== Life and career ==
Born in Campina Grande, in the state of Paraíba, he lived only a short time there; one of the few memories he has of that time is the friendship his father had with Jackson do Pandeiro. In the late 1940s he moved with his family to Rio de Janeiro and worked as an assistant bricklayer. It was during this time that his father taught him his first chords on the mandolin and guitar.

He began his musical career in 1964 as guitarist in the Bossa Trio, a group that emerged in the wake of the proliferation of samba jazz groups linked to bossa nova, but with a marked influence of jazz and, until then, incipient American soul. Despite its short duration, the Bossa Trio recorded two LPs and a series of compact discs. After this experience, Cassiano, his brother Camarão and his friend Amaro founded Os Diagonais, a group notably influenced by American soul music.

Although he participated only in the album "Os Diagonais", released in 1969, Cassiano's musical work in the group caught the attention of other artists in the Brazilian scene. Among them was Tim Maia, who, after a period in the United States, discovered in the composer from Paraíba another enthusiast of the work of Marvin Gaye, Otis Redding and Stevie Wonder. It was then that Tim Maia invited the musician to participate in the singer's first record both as guitarist and composer—Cassiano sang four of the twelve tracks on the 1970 LP "Tim Maia": "Você Fingiu", "Padre Cícero", this one in partnership with Tim, "Eu Amo Você" and "Primavera (Vai Chuva)", both in partnership with Sílvio Rochael and great successes on Brazilian radio stations.

The positive commercial reception of Tim Maia's debut album enabled the chance for Cassiano to record his first solo album, "Imagem e Som", released in 1971 by RCA. On it are the author's version of "Primavera (Vai Chuva)" and two partnerships with Tim, "Tenho Dito" and "Ela Mandou Esperar". Although it gained belated recognition as a sophisticated blend of bossa, samba, soul, and funk, the LP didn't get a great deal of notice at the time of its release.

In 1973 by Odeon, Cassiano recorded his second LP, "Apresentamos Nosso Cassiano," on which he interpreted ten compositions of his own, including "Cedo ou Tarde" (in partnership with Suzana), "Me Chame Atenção" (composed with Renato Britto) and "Castiçal." Although the songs had gained a more pop veneer compared to the first album, the record still had moments of quasi-psychedelia and an echo of progressive rock, in addition to the absence of a commercial hit, which made it difficult to assimilate the work on the country's radio stations.

It was then that, starting in 1975, Cassiano finally achieved commercial success in Brazil with the singles "A Lua e Eu" and "Coleção" (both composed in partnership with Paulo Zdanowski), whose success was also boosted by the inclusion of both on the soundtrack of the telenovelas "O Grito" (where "A Lua e Eu" entered) and "Locomotivas" (where "Coleção" entered), both from Rede Globo. With these two songs in the repertoire, the 1976 album "Cuban Soul" became the reference record of his work, but even this success did not ease Cassiano's relationship with record companies.

In 1978, CBS gave up on releasing a fourth Cassiano album because it considered it a product with no guaranteed financial return. At that same time, health problems began to hinder the musician's musical career. Forced to remove part of his lung, Cassiano was only able to resume his career, in a much more measured way, in 1984. A new work, which would also be his last studio LP, was released in 1991. The album "Cedo ou Tarde" featured Sandra de Sá, Ed Motta and Claudio Zoli - three artists clearly influenced by him - Djavan, Luiz Melodia and Marisa Monte. In addition to re-recorded old hits, there were also a few unreleased compositions (such as "Rio Best-seller"), but without control of the album's musical direction, Cassiano was extremely dissatisfied with the final result of this tribute-LP, and the singer never recorded another album, remaining reclusive and withdrawn in an apartment in the south zone of Rio de Janeiro for the last three decades of his life.

In 2000, Ed Motta produced "Cassiano Coleção", a compilation album with 14 tracks taken from the three LPs Cassiano released between 1971 and 1976.

In 2021, Cassiano's lung problems worsened. After a few weeks of hospitalization at the Hospital Estadual Carlos Chagas in Rio de Janeiro, the composer died of a cardiac arrhythmia on May 7, at the age of 77.

== Discography ==
Solo career studio albums

- 1971 - Imagem e Som
- 1973 - Apresentamos nosso Cassiano
- 1976 - Cuban Soul
- 1991 - Cedo ou Tarde

Anthology albums

- 2000 - Cassiano Coleção

As member of Os Diagonais

- 1969 - Os Diagonais
