= Pastor López =

Venezuelan musical artist (1944–2019)

- López in an undated image

Background information
- Born: José Pastor López Pineda; 15 June 1944; Barquisimeto, Lara, Venezuela
- Died: 5 April 2019 (aged 74) Cúcuta, Colombia
- Genres: Cumbia, porro
- Occupation: Singer
- Years active: 1967–2019
- Formerly of: Nelson Henríquez, Willie Quintero

José Pastor López Pineda (15 June 1944 – 5 April 2019), better known as "El Indio Pastor" (Pastor the Indian), was a venezuelan and Colombian singer-songwriter who worked primarily in the style of Colombian Cumbia.

== Career and death ==
He was born on 15 June 1944 in Barquisimeto. He started out singing Joropo in a group with his brothers, but didn't gain more widespread notoriety until joining forces with fellow musician Nelson Henríquez. After two years performing in Nelson Henriquez's group (1972–1973) he decided to branch off and form his own: "Pastor López y su Combo." Many of the cumbias he has recorded are interpretations of works associated with "Colombian cumbia", including "Cariñito sin mi", "Bonita y Mentirosa", and "Traicionera" among others. The success of his more than 30 year musical career has not been limited to his two nations of residence, Venezuela and Colombia, but spans the United States, Canada, Spain, the United Kingdom, and other countries with significant Latino populations. He was one of the foremost recording stars for the dominantly Cumbia record label Discos Fuentes.

He died on 5 April 2019, at the age of 74 years, at the North Clinic in Cúcuta, Colombia, after having suffered a stroke.

== Discography ==
- La Camisa Bacana – Pastor López con el Conjunto de los Hermanos López (1966)
- Honda Herida – Pastor López con el Conjunto de los Hermanos López (1967)
- La Venezolana – Pastor López con el Conjunto de los Hermanos López (1967)
- Sueños de Cumbiambrea – Pastor López con Los Mayorales.
- Primer Compás – Pastor López con Los Tomasinos (1971)
- Venezuela 73 Con sabor Internacional (Con el combo de Nelson Henríquez) (1973)
- Mano A Mano Pastor López-Willie Quintero (1973)
- Pastor López Y Su Combo (1974)
- Mano A Mano Pastor López Y Los Auténticos-Willie Quintero (1974)
- Mano A Mano Pastor López-Joe Rodríguez (1975)
- Bienvenidos (1975)
- Lo Mejor (1976)
- La Venezolana (1976)
- El Negro Parrandero (1977)
- Traicionera (1978)
- El Indio Pastor (1979)
- Sólo Un Cigarrillo (1979)
- Único (1980)
- Aquí Está El Sabor (1980)
- El Número Uno/La Cumbia (1981)
- El Exitoso (1982)
- Lo Máximo/Golpe Con Golpe (1983)
- Para Colombia/Para Todos (1984)
- El Inigualable/El Iniguabale Sabor (1985)
- Con Toda La Fuerza (1985)
- Para Mi Colombia/Siempre Listo (1986)
- El Magnífico Indio/Amigo (1986)
- Cumbia Universal (1986)
- El Insuperable/Bailable Sólido/Vengo Con Todo (1987)
- El Incontenible/Baile Latino (1988)
- Las Bonitas No Son Fieles (1989)
- Con Calor Tropical (1990)
- El Formidable/La Gran Bailanta (1991)
- El Indio (1993)
- 16 Éxitos-Nuevas Grabaciones (1996)
- 16 Éxitos-Nuevas Grabaciones Vol. 2 (1996)
- Pa' La Gozadera (1997)
- 20 Años Haciendo Éxitos (1997)
- Mucho Más (1998)
- Plegaria Vallenata (1999)
- Navidades Con Pastor (1999)
- Empinando El Codo (2000)
- El Inconfundible (2001)
- Le Canta A Julio Jaramillo (2002)
- Vuelve Con Mucho Más (2007)
