= Julio Iglesias discography =

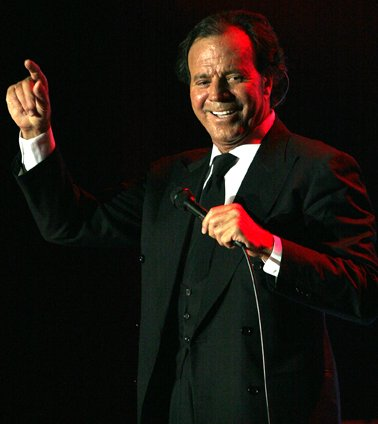
- Studio albums: 60
- Live albums: 2
- Compilation albums: 19

This list contains all studio and live albums of original materials of Spanish singer Julio Iglesias, one of the best-selling artists worldwide, with 300 million records sold. He has recorded in 14 languages and released 80 albums, and has more than 2,600 gold and platinum records certified. He holds the Guinness World Records for the Best-selling Male Latin Artist and is recognized as the best selling international artist in Brazil with over 15 million records sold.

== Albums ==
=== Studio albums ===
==== 1960s ====
Title	Album details	Peak chart positions
Title	Album details	SPA
Yo canto	Released: 1969; Label: Columbia (CP-9035)	3

==== 1970s ====
Title	Album details	Peak chart positions						Certifications
Title	Album details	SPA	ARG	GER	ITA	JPN	NLD	Certifications
Gwendolyne	Released: 1970; Label: Decca (DL 24423)	1	—	—	—	—	—	
Por una mujer / Un canto a Galicia	Released: 1972; Label: Columbia	—	—	24	—	—	1	
Soy	Released:1973; Label: Columbia (KLS-60,009)	—	—	—	—	—	—	
Und das Meer singt sein Lied	Released: 1973; Label: Philips (62 973)	—	—	11	—	—	—	
A flor de piel	Released: 1974; Label: Columbia (TXS 3020)	—	1	—	—	—	—	
Ich schick' dir eine weiße Wolke	Released: 1974; Label: Philips (6305 900)	—	—	41	—	—	—	
A México	Released: 1975; Label: Columbia (TXS 3028)	7	—	—	—	—	—	
El amor	Released: 1975; Label: Columbia (CPS 9726)	4	1	—	—	72	13	ARG: Diamond
América	Released: 1976; Label: Columbia	11	1	—	—	8	—	
Ein Weihnachtsabend mit Julio Iglesias	Released: 1976; Label: CBS (83237)	—	—	—	—	—	—	NLD: Gold
A mis 33 años	Released: 1977; Label: Philips (6305-906)	8	2	—	—	52	8	
Aimer la vie	Released: 1978; Label: CBS (82854)	—	—	—	—	—	—	CAN: Gold; FRA: 2× Platinum
Emociones	Released: 1978; Label: Columbia	11	1	—	—	39	1	NLD: Platinum
Às vezes tu, Às vezes eu	Released: 1978; Label: CBS (230.017)	—	—	—	—	—	—	
Sono un pirata, sono un signore	Released: 1978; Label: CBS (PFCX-90616)	—	—	—	4	—	—	ITA: Platinum
À vous les femmes	Released: 1979; Label: CBS (PFCX-90548)	—	—	—	—	—	—	CAN: Gold; FRA: Diamond
Innamorarsi alla mia età	Released: 1979; Label: CBS (468778)	—	—	—	1	—	—	AUS: Gold
"—" denotes album did not chart or was not released in that region.

==== 1980s ====
Title	Album details	Peak chart positions										Certifications
Title	Album details	SPA	ARG	AUS	GER	ITA	NLD	NZ	SWE	UK	US	Certifications
Hey!	Released: 1980; Label: CBS (84304)	1	1	65	—	—	5	9	—	—	179	NLD: Gold; US: Gold; US: 4× Platinum (Latin)
Sentimental	Released: 1980; Label: CBS (84357)	—	—	—	—	—	—	—	—	—	—	CAN: Gold; FRA: Diamond
Amanti	Released: 1980; Label: CBS (84805)	—	—	—	—	4	—	—	—	—	—	
De niña a mujer	Released: 1981; Label: CBS (85063)	1	2	—	—	—	7	—	26	43	181	
Fidèle	Released: 1981; Label: CBS (85066)	—	—	—	—	—	—	—	—	—	—	FRA: 2× Platinum
Zartlichkeiten	Released: 1981; Label: CBS (85276)	—	—	—	9	—	—	—	—	—	—	GER: Gold
Begin the Beguine	Released: 1981; Label: CBS (85462)	—	—	15	—	—	—	24	—	5	—	AUS: Gold; UK: Gold
Momentos	Released: 1982; Label: CBS (CX 25 113)	1	2	—	16	—	24	—	—	—	191	NLD: Gold; US: 2× Platinum (Latin)
Momenti	Released: 1982; Label: CBS (CX 85943)	—	—	93	—	1	—	—	—	—	—	
Amor	Released: 1982; Label: CBS (25103)	—	—	—	—	—	—	—	—	14	—	UK: Silver
Et l'amour crea la femme	Released: 1982; Label: CBS (25092)	—	—	—	—	—	—	—	—	—	—	FRA: Platinum
1100 Bel Air Place	Released: 1984; Label: CBS (86308)	1	—	2	7	9	3	1	9	14	5	AUS: 2× Platinum; CAN: 5× Platinum; FRA: Gold; US: 4× Platinum; UK: Silver
Libra	Released: 1985; Label: CBS (26623)	1	4	23	26	—	15	—	24	61	92	US: Gold; US: 6× Platinum (Latin)
Un hombre solo	Released: 1987; Label: CBS (450908 2)	1	—	—	—	—	—	—	—	—	— (Note: Un hombre solo did not enter the Billboard 200, but it peaked at number 1 on Billboard's Top Latin Pop Albums.)	ARG: 4× Platinum
Tutto l'amore che ti manca	Released: 1987; Label: CBS (450990 2)	—	—	—	—	4	—	—	—	—	—	
Non Stop	Released: 1988; Label: CBS (460990 1)	—	—	29	—	—	23	20	30	33	52	CAN: Gold; UK: Silver; US: Gold
Raíces	Released: 1989; Label: CBS (465316 1)	1	—	—	—	—	7	—	50	—	— (Note: Raíces did not enter the Billboard 200, but it peaked at number 45 on the Billboard Top Latin Albums chart.)	NLD: Gold
"—" denotes album did not chart or was not released in that region.

==== 1990s ====
Title	Album details	Peak chart positions										Certifications
Title	Album details	SPA	AUS	FRA	GER	NLD	NOR	NZ	SWE	UK	US	Certifications
Starry Night	Released: 1990; Label: CBS (4672841)	5	13	—	—	5	—	—	—	27	37	AUS: Platinum; BRA: 2× Platinum; CAN: Platinum; NLD: Platinum; US: Gold
Calor	Released: 1992; Label: Columbia (4716012)	1	98	12	72	1	—	—	49	—	186	BRA: Gold; NLD: Gold
Anche senza di te	Released: 1992; Label: Columbia (4718351)	—	—	—	—	—	—	—	—	—	—	
Crazy	Released: 1994; Label: Columbia (4747381)	1	7	—	73	7	7	6	44	6	30	AUS: Gold; BRA: Platinum; CAN: Gold; NLD: Platinum; SPA: 2× Platinum; UK: Platinum; US: Gold
La carretera	Released: 1995; Label: Columbia (4807042)	1	—	13	—	8	33	—	32	6	— (Note: La carretera did not enter the Billboard 200, but it peaked at number 3 on the Billboard Top Latin Albums chart.)	ARG: 3× Platinum; FRA: Gold; NLD: Gold; SPA: 6× Platinum
Tango	Released: 1996; Label: Columbia (4866752)	1	16	5	35	16	37	21	13	56	81	ARG: 4× Platinum; AUS: Platinum; CAN: Gold; FRA: Platinum; NLD: Platinum; SPA: 6× Platinum; SWE: Gold; UK: Silver; US: Gold; US: 6× Platinum (Latin)
"—" denotes album did not chart or was not released in that region.

==== 2000s–2010s ====
Title	Album details	Peak chart positions									Certifications
Title	Album details	SPA	AUS	FRA	NLD	ITA	NOR	POR	UK	US Latin	Certifications
Noche de cuatro lunas	Released: 2000; Label: Sony (CK 061382)	1	—	13	9	—	40	2	32	3	ARG: Gold; FRA: Gold; MEX: Gold; NLD: Gold; SPA: 5× Platinum; US: Platinum (Latin)
Divorcio	Released: 2003; Label: Sony (LAK-93217)	2	—	14	38	—	4	5	—	9	ARG: Platinum; SPA: 2× Platinum; FRA: 2× Gold
L'Homme que je suis	Released: 2005; Label: Sony (COL 520050 2)	24	—	3	—	—	—	—	—	—	FRA: Gold
Romantic Classics	Released: 2006; Label: Columbia (88697 09662 2)	7	42	21	27	75	9	7	42	—	SPA: 2× Platinum
Quelque chose de France	Released: 2007; Label: Sony (BMG 697089 2)	—	—	14	—	—	—	—	—	—	
1	Released: 2011; Label: Sony (7891430165925)	3	94	21	—	—	—	18	18	12	SPA: Platinum
México	Released: 18 September 2015; Label: Sony (88875152182)	1	—	140	64	—	—	9	—	2	SPA: Gold
México & Amigos	Released: 2017; Label: Sony (88875152182)	2	—	—	—	—	—	—	—	49	
"—" denotes album did not chart or was not released in that region.

=== Live albums ===
Title	Album details	Peak chart positions				Certifications
Title	Album details	SPA	ITA	US	US Latin	Certifications
En el Olympia	Released: 1976; Label: Philips (6641 488)	—	—	—	—	
En concierto	Released: 1983; Label: CBS (88631)	6	15	159	34	AUS: Gold; US: 2× Platinum (Latin)
"—" denotes album did not chart or was not released in that region.

=== Compilation albums ===
Title	Album details	Peak chart positions										Certifications
Title	Album details	SPA	AUS	ITA	NLD	NOR	NZ	POR	SWE	UK	US Latin	Certifications
Da Manuela a Pensami	Released: 1978; Label: CBS (88336)	—	—	3	—	—	—	—	—	—	—	ITA: Platinum
The 24 Greatest Songs	Released: 1979; Label: CBS (88469)	—	—	—	1	—	—	—	—	—	—	FRA: 2× Gold; NLD: Platinum
Mes Chansons en Français	Released: 1980; Label: CBS (66361)	—	—	—	—	—	—	—	—	—	—	FRA: Gold
14 Suosituinta Sävelmää	Released: 1981; Label: CBS (24004)	—	—	—	—	—	—	—	—	—	—	FIN: Platinum
Minhas canções preferidas	Released: 1981; Label: CBS (138.220)	—	—	—	—	—	—	—	—	—	—	
Pour toi	Released: 1982; Label: CBS (CDM 2040)	—	—	—	—	—	—	—	—	—	—	CAN: Platinum
Internacional	Released: 1983; Label: Columbia (CPS 9728)	—	—	—	—	—	—	—	—	—	—	
Julio	Released: 1983; Label: CBS (10038)	—	—	—	—	—	—	—	—	5	6	AUS: Gold; BRA: Platinum; CAN: Platinum; FRA: 2× Gold; US: 2× Platinum; UK: Gold
Tour Souvenir Collection	Released: 1992; Label: Columbia (001016 2)	—	—	—	—	—	—	—	—	—	—	
Mi Vida: Grandes Éxitos	Released: 1998; Label: Columbia (492592 2)	1	—	—	—	—	—	—	—	—	21	ARG: 2× Platinum; SPA: 5× Platinum; US: 2× Platinum (Latin)
My Life: The Greatest Hits	Released: 1998; Label: Columbia (C2K 69577)	—	—	—	26	5	28	—	7	18	4	CAN: Gold; US: 2× Platinum; UK: Silver
La Mia Vita: I Miei Successi	Released: 1998; Label: Columbia (491093 2)	—	—	—	—	—	—	—	—	—	—	
Ma Vie: Mes Plus Grands Succes	Released: 1998; Label: Columbia (491093 2)	—	—	—	—	—	—	—	—	—	—	FRA: 2× Gold
Minha Vida Meus Sucessos	Released: 1998; Label: Columbia (491094 2)	—	—	—	—	—	—	21	—	—	—	BRA: Platinum
Una donna può cambiar la vita	Released: 2001; Label: Columbia (COL 502395 2)	—	—	20	—	—	—	—	—	—	—	
Ao Meu Brasil	Released: 2001; Label: Columbia (2-504611)	—	—	—	—	—	—	—	—	—	—	BRA: Platinum
Love Songs	Released: 2003; Label: Sony (COL 512604 2)	—	14	—	18	—	18	3	—	64	—	SPA: Platinum
Love Songs - Canciones de Amor	Released: 2004; Label: Sony (COL 512604 9)	—	—	—	—	—	—	13	—	—	—	
En français...	Released: 2004; Label: Columbia (COL 517915 2)	—	—	—	—	—	—	—	—	—	—	FRA: Gold
1: The Collection	Released: 2014; Label: Sony	—	—	—	—	—	—	—	—	81	—	
Dois Corações	Released: 2017; Label: Sony	—	—	—	—	—	—	16	—	—	—	
"—" denotes album did not chart or was not released in that region.

== Singles ==
=== 1960s ===
Title	Year	Peak chart positions	Album
Title	Year	SPA	Album
"La vida sigue igual"	1968	15	Yo canto
"El viejo Pablo"	1968	—	Yo canto
"No llores, mi amor"	1968	20	Yo canto
"Yo canto"	1969	10	Yo canto
"Se lei non c'è"	1969	—	Non-album singles
"Un uomo solo"	1969	—	Non-album singles
"—" denotes single did not chart or was not released in that region.

=== 1970s ===
Title	Year	Peak chart positions						Certifications	Album
Title	Year	SPA	ARG	BEL Fla.	BEL Wal.	GER	NLD	Certifications	Album
"Chiquilla"	1970	16	—	—	—	—	—		Yo Canto
"Gwendolyne"	1970	1	—	—	—	—	—		Gwendolyne
"Cuando vuelva a amanecer"	1971	29	—	—	—	—	—		Gwendolyne
"En un rincón del desván"	1971	25	—	—	—	—	—		Por una mujer / Un canto a Galicia
"Un canto a Galicia"	1971	14	—	1	1	12	1		Por una mujer / Un canto a Galicia
"Por una mujer"	1972	15	17	—	—	—	—		Por una mujer / Un canto a Galicia
"Río rebelde"	1972	5	—	—	—	34	—		Por una mujer / Un canto a Galicia
"Wenn Ein Schiff Vorüberfährt"	1972	—	—	—	—	6	—		Und das Meer singt sein Lied
"Du in deiner Welt"	1973	—	—	—	—	22	—		Und das Meer singt sein Lied
"Und das Meer singt sein Lied"	1973	—	—	—	—	14	—		Und das Meer singt sein Lied
"Así nacemos"	1973	24	19	—	—	—	—		Soy
"Minueto"	1973	14	—	—	—	—	—		Soy
"Dieciseis años"	1974	—	—	—	—	—	—		Soy
"A flor de piel"	1974	9	1	—	48	—	—		A flor de piel
"Por el amor de una mujer"	1974	—	—	—	48	—	—		A flor de piel
"Manuela"	1974	3	—	25	1	—	19		A flor de piel
"En cualquier parte"	1974	—	—	—	—	—	—		A flor de piel
"Alle Liebe dieser Erde"	1974	—	—	—	—	15	—		Ich schick' dir eine weiße Wolke
"Ich schick' dir eine weiße Wolke"	1974	—	—	—	—	45	—		Ich schick' dir eine weiße Wolke
"Komm wieder Madonna"	1974	—	—	—	—	29	—		Ich schick' dir eine weiße Wolke
"Cucurrucucú paloma"	1975	16	—	—	—	—	—		A México
"Corazón, corazón"	1975	—	1	—	—	—	—		A México
"Abrázame"	1975	7	—	—	18	—	—		El amor
"Quiero"	1975	—	1	6	18	—	11		El amor
"El amor"	1975	—	—	—	33	—	—		El amor
"A veces tú, a veces yo"	1975	—	—	—	33	—	—		El amor
"Schenk mir deine Liebe"	1975	—	—	—	—	—	—		Non-album singles
"Kein Addio, kein Goodbye"	1976	—	—	—	—	—	—		Non-album singles
"Ce n'est rien qu'un au revoir"	1976	—	—	—	8	—	—		Non-album singles
"Júrame"	1976	—	—	—	—	—	—		América
"Soy un truhán, soy un señor"	1977	9	—	—	—	—	—		A mis 33 años
"Sono io"	1977	—	—	—	—	—	—		A mis 33 años
"33 años"	1978	—	—	—	—	—	—		A mis 33 años
"Si me dejas no vale"	1978	—	1	—	—	—	—		A mis 33 años
"Por un poco de tu amor"	1978	—	—	—	—	—	25		A mis 33 años
"Aimer la vie"	1978	—	—	22	—	—	—		Aimer la vie
"Le monde est fou, le monde est beau"	1978	—	—	—	—	—	—		Aimer la vie
"Er war ja nur ein Zigeuner"	1978	—	—	—	—	—	—		Non-album single
"Me olvidé de vivir"	1978	20	7	—	—	—	—		Emociones
"Pobre diablo"	1978	—	—	—	—	—	—		Emociones
"Quiéreme mucho"	1978	—	—	1	—	—	1		Emociones
"Quiéreme"	1978	—	—	7	—	—	11		Emociones
"Pregúntale"	1979	—	—	—	—	—	—		Emociones
"Pauvres diables"	1979	—	—	16	—	—	—		À vous les femmes
"Où est passé ma bohème?"	1979	—	—	19	—	—	—	FRA: Gold	À vous les femmes
"—" denotes single did not chart or was not released in that region.

=== 1980s ===
Title	Year	Peak chart positions										Certifications	Album
Title	Year	ARG	AUS	CAN	FRA	GER	NLD	NZ	SWI	UK	US	Certifications	Album
"Hey!"	1980	1	56	—	—	—	—	7	—	31	—		Hey!
"Un sentimental"	1980	—	—	—	—	—	25	—	—	—	—		Hey!
"Il faut toujours un perdant"	1980	—	—	—	18	—	—	—	—	—	—		Sentimental
"Begin the Beguine (Volver a empezar)"	1981	—	41	—	—	—	44	25	7	1	—	UK: Gold	De niña a mujer
"Que nadie sepa mi sufrir"	1981	—	—	—	—	—	31	—	—	—	—		De niña a mujer
"De niña a mujer"	1981	3	—	—	—	—	—	—	—	—	—		De niña a mujer
"Yours (Quiéreme mucho)"	1981	—	—	—	—	—	—	—	—	3	—	UK: Silver	Begin the Beguine
"...aber der Traum war sehr schön"	1981	—	—	—	—	57	—	—	—	—	—		Zärtlichkeiten
"Mit Tränen in den Augen ist man blind"	1981	—	—	—	—	—	—	—	—	—	—		Zärtlichkeiten
"Du bist mein erster Gedanke"	1982	—	—	—	—	62	—	—	—	—	—		Zärtlichkeiten
"Amor"	1982	—	—	—	—	54	43	—	—	32	—		Momentos
"Con la misma piedra"	1982	—	—	—	—	—	—	—	—	—	—		Momentos
"Nathalie"	1982	2	—	—	—	—	—	—	—	—	—		Momentos
"Et l'amour crea la femme"	1982	—	—	—	—	—	—	—	—	—	—		Et l'amour créa la femme
"So Close to Me"	1982	—	—	—	—	—	—	—	—	92	—		Amor
"Forever and Ever"	1983	—	—	—	—	—	—	—	—	91	—		Amor
"All of You" (with Diana Ross)	1984	—	19	8	27	32	7	10	—	43	19	CAN: Gold	1100 Bel Air Place
"Me va, me va"	1984	—	—	—	—	—	—	—	—	—	—		1100 Bel Air Place
"Moonlight Lady"	1984	—	43	—	28	—	—	—	—	—	— (Note: "Moonlight Lady" did not enter the Billboard Hot 100, but it peaked at number 17 on the Adult Contemporary chart.)		1100 Bel Air Place
"The Air That I Breathe" (with The Beach Boys)	1984	—	—	—	—	—	—	—	—	—	—		1100 Bel Air Place
"To All the Girls I've Loved Before" (with Willie Nelson)	1984	—	4	1	—	24	3	2	23	17	5	US: Platinum; CAN: Platinum	1100 Bel Air Place
"Coração apaixonado"	1985	—	—	—	—	—	—	—	—	—	—		Libra
"Felicidades" (with Pedro Vargas)	1985	—	—	—	—	—	—	—	—	—	—		Libra
"I've Got You Under My Skin"	1985	—	—	—	—	—	—	—	—	—	—		Libra
"Ni te tengo, ni te olvido"	1985	—	—	—	—	—	—	—	—	—	—		Libra
"America" (English version)	1986	—	—	—	—	—	—	—	—	—	—		Non-album single
"Intentando otra vez enamorarte"	1987	—	—	—	—	—	—	—	—	—	— (Note: "Intentando otra vez enamorarte" did not enter the Billboard Hot 100, but it peaked at number 49 on the Hot Latin Songs chart.)		Un hombre solo
"Lo Mejor de Tu Vida"	1987	—	—	—	—	—	—	—	—	—	— (Note: "Lo Mejor de Tu Vida" did not enter the Billboard Hot 100, but it peaked at number 1 on the Hot Latin Songs chart.)		Un hombre solo
"Que No Se Rompa la Noche"	1987	—	—	—	—	—	—	—	—	—	— (Note: "Que No Se Rompa la Noche" did not enter the Billboard Hot 100, but it peaked at number 1 on the Hot Latin Songs chart.)		Un hombre solo
"Todo el amor que te hace falta"	1987	—	—	—	—	—	—	—	—	—	— (Note: "Todo el amor que te hace falta" did not enter the Billboard Hot 100, but it peaked at number 8 on the Hot Latin Songs chart.)		Un hombre solo
"Alguien"	1988	—	—	—	—	—	—	—	—	—	— (Note: "Alguien" did not enter the Billboard Hot 100, but it peaked at number 18 on the Hot Latin Songs chart.)		Un hombre solo
"Ae ao"	1988	—	—	—	—	—	76	—	—	—	—		Non Stop
"I Know It's Over"	1988	—	—	—	—	—	—	—	—	—	—		Non Stop
"Love Is on Our Side Again"	1988	—	—	—	—	—	—	—	—	81	—		Non Stop
"My Love" (with Stevie Wonder)	1988	—	39	34	—	—	16	—	—	5	80		Non Stop
"Brasil Medley"	1989	—	—	—	—	—	—	—	—	—	—		Raíces
"Caballo Viejo (Bamboleo)"	1989	—	—	—	—	—	83	—	—	—	— (Note: "Caballo Viejo (Bamboleo)" did not enter the Billboard Hot 100, but it peaked at number 6 on the Hot Latin Songs chart.)		Raíces
"Francia Medley"	1989	—	—	—	—	—	—	—	—	—	—		Raíces
"Medley Mexicano"	1989	—	—	—	—	—	—	—	—	—	— (Note: "Medley Mexicano" did not enter the Billboard Hot 100, but it peaked at number 37 on the Hot Latin Songs chart.)		Raíces
"—" denotes single did not chart or was not released in that region.

=== 1990s ===
Title	Year	Peak chart positions						Album
Title	Year	AUS	FRA	NLD	NZ	UK	US Latin	Album
""Can't Help Falling in Love"	1990	106	—	—	—	—	—	Starry Night
"Vincent (Starry Starry Night)"	1990	—	—	—	—	—	—	Starry Night
"When I Need You"	1990	—	—	—	—	—	—	Starry Night
"Torero" (with José Luis Rodríguez)	1992	—	—	—	—	—	1	Non-album single
"Esos amores"	1992	—	—	—	—	—	23	Calor
"La quiero como es"	1992	—	—	—	—	—	—	Calor
"Milonga sentimental/Vivo" (medley)	1992	—	—	10	—	—	5	Calor
"Y aunque te haga calor"	1992	—	—	—	—	—	8	Calor
"Crazy"	1994	67	—	32	13	43	9	Crazy
"Fragile" (feat. Sting)	1994	—	—	—	—	53	—	Crazy
"Guajira/Oye como va"	1994	—	—	—	—	—	—	Crazy
"Song of Joy" (with The London Symphony Orchestra & The Ambrosian Singers)	1994	—	—	—	—	—	—	Crazy
"When You Tell Me That You Love Me" (with Dolly Parton)	1994	—	—	45	—	—	—	Crazy
"Agua Dulce, Agua Salá"	1995	—	—	—	—	—	3	La Carretera
"Baila morena"	1995	—	—	—	—	—	12	La Carretera
"La carretera"	1995	—	—	—	—	—	10	La Carretera
"Vers la frontière"	1995	—	45	—	—	—	—	La Carretera
"Vuela alto"	1995	—	—	—	—	—	—	La Carretera
"Caminito"	1996	—	—	—	—	—	—	Tango
"El Choclo"	1996	—	—	—	—	—	— (Note: "El Choclo" did not enter the Hot Latin Songs chart, but it peaked at number 32 on Billboard’s Dance Club Songs chart.)	Tango
"El día que me quieras"	1996	—	—	—	—	—	—	Tango
"La cumparsita"	1996	—	—	—	—	—	—	Tango
"Mano a mano"	1996	—	—	—	—	—	—	Tango
"Tango Medley"	1996	—	—	—	—	—	27	Tango
"La gota fría"	1998	—	—	—	—	—	—	Mi Vida: Grandes Éxitos
"—" denotes single did not chart or was not released in that region.

=== 2000s–2010s ===
Title	Year	Peak chart positions			Album
Title	Year	SPA	NLD	US Latin	Album
"Dos corazones, dos historias" (with Alejandro Fernández)	2000	—	—	29	Noche de cuatro lunas
"Gozar la vida"	2000	19	66	8	Noche de cuatro lunas
"Mal acostumbrado"	2000	—	—	—	Noche de cuatro lunas
"Me siento de aquí"	2001	—	—	—	Noche de cuatro lunas
"Una donna può cambiar la vita"	2001	—	—	—	Una donna può cambiar la vita
"Cómo han pasado los años"	2003	—	—	—	Divorcio
"Corazón de papel"	2003	—	—	35	Divorcio
"El bacalao"	2003	—	—	—	Divorcio
"Qué ganaste"	2003	—	—	—	Divorcio
"Échame a mí la culpa"	2004	—	—	—	Divorcio
"L'homme que je suis"	2005	—	—	—	L'homme que je suis
"Everybody's Talkin'"	2006	—	—	—	Romantic Classics
"I Want to Know What Love Is"	2006	—	—	—	Romantic Classics
"To All the Girls I've Loved Before" (with Jan Smit)	2013	—	28	—	Non-album single
"Fallaste corazón"	2015	—	—	—	México
"—" denotes single did not chart or was not released in that region.

=== As featured artist ===
Title	Year	Peak chart positions				Album
Title	Year	AUS	CAN Country	US Country	US Latin	Album
"Spanish Eyes" (Willie Nelson featuring Julio Iglesias)	1988	93	3	8	—	What a Wonderful World
"Sé que volverás" (with Nana Mouskouri)	1996	—	—	—	—	Nana Latina
"Puedes Llegar" (with Voces Unidas)	1996	—	—	—	2	Voces Unidas
"—" denotes single did not chart or was not released in that region.

== Other appearances ==
Year	Title	Album
1995	"Somos Dos Caminantes" (Lola Flores featuring Julio Iglesias)	Para Siempre Lola
1996	"Un Ramito De Violetas" (Cecilia featuring Julio Iglesias)	Desde Que Tú Te Has Ido
1996	"My Way (A Mi Manera)" (Paul Anka featuring Julio Iglesias)	Amigos
2000	"Estoy Enamorado" (Donato & Estéfano featuring Julio Iglesias)	Lo Mejor De Donato & Estéfano
2004	"Quizas, Quizas, Quizas" (Arielle Dombasle featuring Julio Iglesias)	Amor Amor
2004	"Esos Amores" (Los Temerarios featuring Julio Iglesias)	Regalo de Amor
2006	"Partir Quand Même..." (Françoise Hardy featuring Julio Iglesias)	(Parenthèses...)
2006	"Uno" (Raúl Di Blasio with Julio Iglesias)	La Historia Del Piano de America...Los Exitos
2010	"Échame A Mí La Culpa" (Albert Hammond featuring Julio Iglesias)	Legend
2017	"El Amigo" (Romeo Santos featuring Julio Iglesias)	Golden
