= List of awards and nominations received by Julio Iglesias =

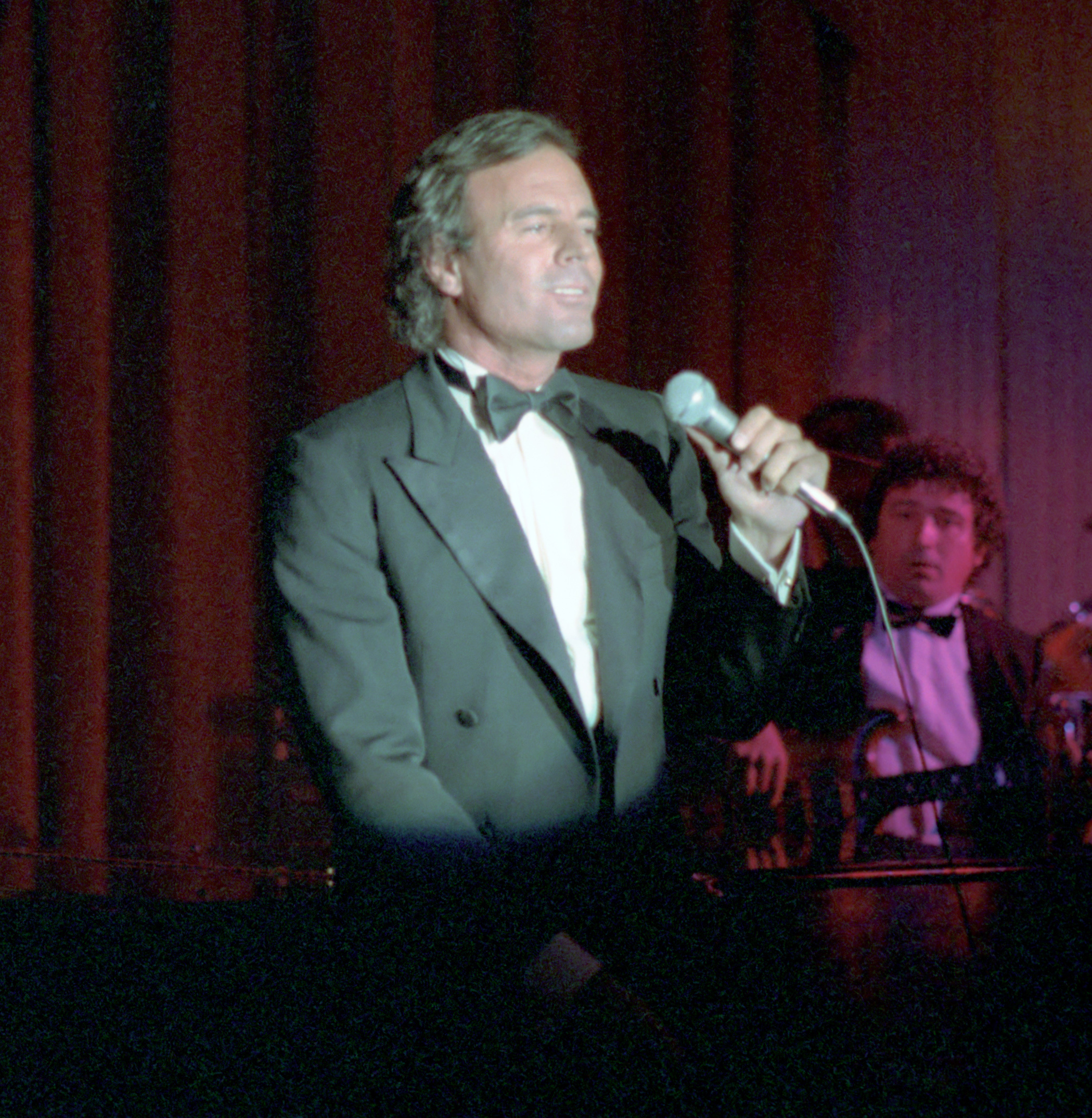
- Julio Iglesias during a performance at the White House in March 1984
Awards and nominations
Award	Wins	Nominations
Academy of Country Music Awards	1	2
American Music Awards	1	1
Grammy Awards	2	7
Latin Grammy Awards	0	1
Lo Nuestro Awards	1	3
The Latin Recording Academy	1	1
World Music Awards	2	2

Totals (Note: Certain award groups do not simply award one winner. They acknowledge several different recipients, have runners-up, and have third place. Since this is a specific recognition and is different from losing an award, runner-up mentions are considered wins in this award tally. For simplification and to avoid errors, each award in this list has been presumed to have had a prior nomination.)
- Wins: 122
- Nominations: 204

Spanish recording artist Julio Iglesias has received various accolades through his career spanning seven decades. Renowned for sung in various languages aside from his native Spanish, he is the all-time best-selling Latino artist and one of the best-selling music artists of all-time.

Julio Iglesias obtained his first accolades in the late 1960s at Benidorm Song Festival (Spain) and Golden Stag Festival (Romania) both for its 1968 edition. During the 1970s, he began to receive awards at the international level; Julio was named Best Revelation Singer during El Heraldo de México Awards of 1971, he earned the fourth place at the Eurovision Song Contest of 1970, and won the Italian's Golden Gondola Award in 1979. In the 1980s, Julio earned his first Grammy Awards nominations, winning in the category Best Latin Performance for Un hombre solo in 1988. He also won an Academy of Country Music Awards for Top Vocal Duo of the Year with "To All the Girls I've Loved Before" alongside Willie Nelson. During the 1990s, he became the first musician to receive Italian's Rudolph Valentino Awards granted by the Motion Picture Association of Italy and the Italian Film Producers' Organization in 1990. He also became the first recipient of the American Music Awards for Favorite Latin Artist in 1998, the first Latino to receive ASCAP's Pied Piper Award in 1997, and received Lo Nuestro Excellence Award in 1995. Throughout 2000s, Julio Iglesias was named Person of the Year by The Latin Recording Academy in 2001, and received the Gold Medal in 2005 by the Queen Sofía Spanish Institute given by Queen Sofía of Spain. Between the 2010s and 2020s, Julio received the Grammy Lifetime Achievement Award in 2019 and achieved his first Latin Grammy Awards nomination in 2021.

Julio is one of the all-time best-selling musicians and has been recognized by various organizations due his sales. In 1973, he received a special Golden Guaicaipuro for his "extraordinary" sales in Venezuela. He was named World's best-selling artist in 1979 and 1980, and was recognized by the Guinness World Records in 1983 with the first and only Diamond Award the organization granted to an artist, for having selling 100 million records in six languages. In the 2010s, he received a special award as the all-time best-selling Latino artist and the best-selling artist in Spain. Years prior, in 1985, Julio Iglesias was recognized by the Chinese Ministry of Culture as the best-selling foreign artist.

Julio has been condecoraded by various governments, including France's highest civil honours, Legion of Honour by President François Mitterrand in 1992, and Knight Legion of Honour by President Nicolas Sarkozy in 2007. He also received the Medal of the City of Paris in 1983 and the Gold Medal of Merit in the Fine Arts in 2010 in his native country. He received the Medal of Competency by Bahrein's King, Hamad bin Isa Al Khalifa in 2012 and Santo Domingo's highest civil award, a heraldic shield in 2009 granted by mayor Roberto Salcedo Sr.

== Awards and nominations ==
Award/organization (Note: Charts are not included, unless they are explicitly described as "awards" or specific trophies are given.)	Year	Nominee/work	Category	Result	Ref.
Academy of Country Music Awards	1985	"To All the Girls I've Loved Before" (with Willie Nelson)	Single of the Year	Nominated	
Academy of Country Music Awards	1985	"To All the Girls I've Loved Before" (with Willie Nelson)	Top Vocal Duo of the Year	Won	
ACE Awards (Argentina)	1995	La Carretera	Best Melodic Album	Won	
ACE Awards (Argentina)	1996	Julio Iglesias	Top Singer	Won	
ALMA Award	2002	Julio Iglesias / Alejandro Fernandez at Billboard Latin Music Awards	Spanish Language performance in a television special	Nominated	
American Music Awards	1998	Julio Iglesias	Favorite Latin Artist	Won	
American Cinema Award	1989	Julio Iglesias	Artist of the Year	Won	
Antena de la Consagración (Colombia)	1973	Julio Iglesias	Artist of the Year	Won	
Antena de la Consagración (Colombia)	1980	Julio Iglesias	Antena de Oro (Gold Antenna)	Honoree	
Asociación Internacional de Prensa, Radio y Televisión (Las Vegas)	2010	Julio Iglesias	Máximo Orgullo Hispano	Honoree	
Asociación Internacional de Prensa, Radio y Televisión (Las Vegas)	2010	Julio Iglesias	"Julio Iglesia's Day" (10 June)	Won	
Asociación Internacional de Prensa, Radio y Televisión (Las Vegas)	2010	Julio Iglesias	Las Vegas Walk of Fame	Nominated	
Asociación de Periodistas del Espectáculo (APE)	1977	Julio Iglesias	International APE	Won	
ASCAP Award	1997	Julio Iglesias	Pied Piper Award	Honoree	
Asociación de Hispanos (Nosotros)	1983	Julio Iglesias	Aguila de Oro (Golden Eagle)	Honoree	
Benidorm Song Festival (a.k.a. Festival de la Canción Española)	1968	Julio Iglesias	Best Vocalist	Won	
Benidorm Song Festival (a.k.a. Festival de la Canción Española)	1968	"La vida sigue igual"	Best Song: 1st place	Won	
Benidorm Song Festival (a.k.a. Festival de la Canción Española)	1968	"La vida sigue igual"	Best Lyrics	Won	
Benidorm Song Festival (a.k.a. Festival de la Canción Española)	1970	Julio Iglesias	Contest winner	Won	
Billboard Latin Music Awards	1996	La Carretera	Pop Album of the Year, Male	Won	
Billboard Latin Music Awards	1997	Tango	Pop Album of the Year, Male	Won	
Billboard Latin Music Awards	2002	"Dos Corazones, Dos Historias" (with Alejandro Fernández)	Hot Latin Track of the Year, Vocal Duo	Nominated	
Billboard Number One Awards (Note: Prior to the inauguration of the Billboard Music Awards in 1990, the magazine had the "Number One Awards" to honor the top-performing artists of the year on each of chart categories.)	1977	America	Latin Pop National	Won	
Billboard Number One Awards	1977	A México	Latin Pop National	Nominated	
Billboard Number One Awards	1977	El amor	Latin Pop National	Nominated	
Billboard Number One Awards	1977	America	Regional Miami Pop	Nominated	
Billboard Number One Awards	1977	El Amor	Regional Miami Pop	Nominated	
Billboard Number One Awards	1977	A México	Chicago Pop	Nominated	
Billboard Number One Awards	1977	America	Los Angeles Pop	Nominated	
Billboard Number One Awards	1977	El Amor	New York Pop	Won	
Billboard Number One Awards	1977	America	New York Pop	Nominated	
Billboard Number One Awards	1977	A México	New York Pop	Nominated	
Billboard Number One Awards	1978	A mis 33 años	Top Latin Pop Album	Nominated	
Billboard Number One Awards	1979	Emociones	Top Latin Pop Album	Nominated	
Billboard Number One Awards	1979	A mis 33 años	Top Latin Pop Album	Nominated	
Billboard Number One Awards	1984	"To All the Girls I've Loved Before" (with Willie Nelson)	Top Country Single	Won	
Billboard Number One Awards	1986	Julio Iglesias	Top Pop Latin Artist	2nd place	
Billboard Number One Awards	1986	Libra	Top Pop Latin Album	2nd place	
Billboard Number One Awards	1987	Julio Iglesias	Top Pop Latin Artist	Nominated	
Billboard Number One Awards	1987	Un hombre solo	Top Pop Latin Album	Nominated	
Billboard Number One Awards	1987	"Lo Mejor de Tu Vida"	Top Hot Latin Tracks	Nominated	
Billboard Number One Awards	1988	Julio Iglesias	Top Pop Latin Artist	3rd place	
Billboard Number One Awards	1988	Un hombre solo	Top Pop Latin Album	Nominated	
Billboard Number One Awards	1989	Julio Iglesias	Top Pop Latin Artist	3rd place	
Billboard Number One Awards	1989	Raíces	Top Pop Latin Album	Nominated	
Billboard Music Video Awards	1990	Julio Iglesias & Plácido Domingo	Latin Best Duo/Group	Nominated	
Buhos de Oro (Golden Owls)	1993	Julio Iglesias	International Award	Honoree	
Bravo Awards	1987	Julio Iglesias	Lifetime Award: Biggest Latin Act	Honoree	
Bravo Awards	1988	Julio Iglesias	Best Male Singer	Nominated	
Bravo Awards	1988	"Lo Mejor de la Vida"	Best Romantic Song	Nominated	
Bravo Awards	1988	"Un hombre solo"	Best Romantic Song	Nominated	
Bravo Awards	1988	Un hombre solo	Best Romantic Album	Nominated	
Bravo Awards	1990	Julio Iglesias	Best Male Singer	Nominated	
Bravo Awards	1990	Raíces	Album of the Year	Nominated	
Cadena Dial	1996	Julio Iglesias	Dial Award	Won	
Cambio 16	1981	Julio Iglesias	Artist of the Decade	Honoree	
Casandra Awards	2007	Julio Iglesias	Casandra International	Won	
CBS International	1981	Julio Iglesias	Crystal Globe Award	Honoree	
Desi Entertainment Awards	1995	Julio Iglesias	Achievement of Hispanic	Nominated	
Disco de Oro de Hollywood (Note: An award celebrated in Los Angeles, and organized by music producer Antonio de Marco and Alfredo Garcia according to La Opinión.)	1973	José José	Winning-Artists	Nominated	
El Heraldo de México Awards	1971	Julio Iglesias	Best Revelation/Singer	Won	
Eurovision Song Contest	1970	"Gwendolyne"	Contest	4th place	
Fundación Independiente de Madrid	2001	Julio Iglesias	Español Universal (Spanish Universal Figure)	Honoree	
Fiesta de la Vendimia, Ribera del Duero	2002	Julio Iglesias	Honorary Winemaker	Honoree	
Fiesta de la Vendimia, Ribera del Duero	2002	Julio Iglesias	Ambassador of Ribera del Duero	Honoree	
Grammy Awards	1981	Hey!	Best Latin Recording	Nominated	
Grammy Awards	1983	Momentos	Best Latin Recording	Nominated	
Grammy Awards	1985	"As Time Goes By"	Best Country Performance By A Duo Or Group With Vocal	Nominated	
Grammy Awards	1988	Un hombre solo	Best Latin Pop Performance	Won	
Grammy Awards	1993	Calor	Best Latin Pop Album	Nominated	
Grammy Awards	1996	La Carretera	Best Latin Pop Performance	Nominated	
Grammy Awards	1998	Tango	Best Latin Pop Performance	Nominated	
Grammy Awards	2019	Julio Iglesias	Grammy Lifetime Achievement Award	Honoree	
Golden Guaicaipuro (Venezuela)	1973	Julio Iglesias	Extraordinary sales in Venezuela	Honoree	
Golden Guaicaipuro (Venezuela)	1981	Julio Iglesias	Best Foreign Singer in Venezuela	Honoree	
Golden Record Awards (China)	1995	Julio Iglesias	Special award	Won	
Golden Stag Festival	1968	Julio Iglesias	Public choice	Won	
Guinness World Records	1983	Julio Iglesias	Diamond Record Award: 100 million records sold in six languages	Honoree	
Hörzu	2007	Julio Iglesias	Goldene Kamera	Honoree	
International Academy of Art of Ischia (Italy)	2007	Julio Iglesias	Music Legend Award	Honoree	
Japan's National Hit Research Committee	1982	Julio Iglesias	Brightest Hope/Male Vocalist	Won	
Jay W. Weiss Gala	1994	Julio Iglesias	Humanitarian Award	Won	
Latin Grammy Awards	2021	"Bohemio" (with Andrés Calamaro)	Record of the Year	Nominated	
Latin Star Inc. (United States)		Julio Iglesias	Star Walk Award	Won	
Lo Nuestro Awards	1990	Raíces	Pop Album of the Year	Nominated	
Lo Nuestro Awards	1995	Julio Iglesias	Excellence Award	Honoree	
Lo Nuestro Awards	1996	El Concierto	Pop Album of the Year	Nominated	
Mardi Gras	1987	Julio Iglesias	Marshal of the Mardi Gras Festivities	Honoree	
Medalla de Oro Mayte Spínola	2024	Julio Iglesias	World's Best Singer	Honoree	
Mostra internazionale di musica leggera	1979	Julio Iglesias	Golden Gondola Award	Honoree	
Museo Provincial del Vino	2011	Julio Iglesias	Honorary Warden (Alcaide de Honor)	Honoree	
Muscular Dystrophy Association	1986	Julio Iglesias	Honorary President	Honoree	
New York Latin ACE Awards	1975	Julio Iglesias	Best Male Singer	Won	
New York Latin ACE Awards	1976	Julio Iglesias	Outstanding Male Singer	Won	
New York Latin ACE Awards	1976	El amor	Album of the Year	Won	
New York Latin ACE Awards	1977	Julio Iglesias	Outstanding Male Singer	Won	
New York Latin ACE Awards	1978	Julio Iglesias at Madison Square Garden	Best Concert	Won	
New York Latin ACE Awards	1980	Julio Iglesias / "Me Olvide de Vivir"	Best Male Artist	Nominated	
New York Latin ACE Awards	1981	Hey!	Best Album — Male	Won	
New York Latin ACE Awards	1982	Julio Iglesias	Best International Artist	Nominated	
New York Latin ACE Awards	1983	Momentos	Album of the Year	Won	
New York Latin ACE Awards	1985	Julio Iglesias en Concierto	Special Event for Television	Nominated	
New York Latin ACE Awards	1985	Julio y Plácido	Special Event for Television	Nominated	
New York Latin ACE Awards	1985	Julio Iglesias	Best International Singer	Nominated	
New York Latin ACE Awards	1987	Julio Iglesias	Best Male Singer	Won	
New York Latin ACE Awards	1988	Julio Iglesias	Best Male Singer	Nominated	
New York Latin ACE Awards	1990	Julio Iglesias	Best Male Singer	Won	
New York Latin ACE Awards	1996	Julio Iglesias	Best Male Singer	Won	
New York Latin ACE Awards	1997	Julio Iglesias	Best Male Singer	Nominated	
New York Latin ACE Awards	1997	Tango	Album of the Year — Male artist	Won	
Onda Cero	2003	Julio Iglesias	Premios Protagonistas	Won	
Premios Aplauso	1992	Julio Iglesias	Artist of the Year	Won	
Premios Gardel	2021	"Bohemio" (with Andrés Calamaro)	Collaboration of the Year	Won	
Premios Juventud	2004	Julio Iglesias	Paparazzi's Favorite Target	Nominated	
Premios Limón (Madrid)	1982	Julio Iglesias	Antipathy to the Press	Won	
Premios Ondas	1994	Julio Iglesias	Best in the International History in Radio	Honoree	
Premios Pueblo	1969	Julio Iglesias	Popular of the Year	Won	
Premios Pueblo	1973	Julio Iglesias	Popular of the Year	Won	
Premios Radio y Televisión	2001	Julio Iglesias	Gold Award	Nominated	
Premios Spania (France)	1985	Julio Iglesias	Premio Naranja (Orange Award)	Won	
Queen Sofía Spanish Institute	2005	Julio Iglesias	Gold Medal	Honoree	
Radio City Music Hall	1997	Julio Iglesias	Foreign artist with most performed shows	Honoree	
Record World	1971	Julio Iglesias	Best Singer of the Year	Nominated	
Record World (International Latin Awards)	1971	Julio Iglesias	Top New Composer — Male	Won	
Rotary International	2011	Julio Iglesias	Paul Harris Medal Award	Honoree	
Rudolph Valentino Awards	1990	Julio Iglesias	Lifetime Achievement	Honoree	
Sociedad General de Autores y Editores (SGAE)	1997	Julio Iglesias	Gold Medal	Honoree	
The BrandLaureate Awards (Asia)	2016	Julio Iglesias	Legendary Artist	Honoree	
The Father's Day Council	1987	Julio Iglesias	Father of the Year	Won	
Tiempo	1984	Julio Iglesias	Hombre de Nuestro Tiempo (Man of Our Time)	Honoree	
The Gleaner Contests Awards	1985	Julio Iglesias	Best Singer of the Year	Nominated	
The Latin Recording Academy	2001	Julio Iglesias	Person of the Year	Honoree	
Victoires De La Musique (France)	1988	Julio Iglesias		Won	
Viña del Mar International Song Festival	1981	Julio Iglesias	Gaviota de Plata (Silver Gull)	Won	
World Music Awards	1997	Julio Iglesias	Best Latin Singer	Won	
World Music Awards		Julio Iglesias	Legend Award	Honoree	

== Other honors ==
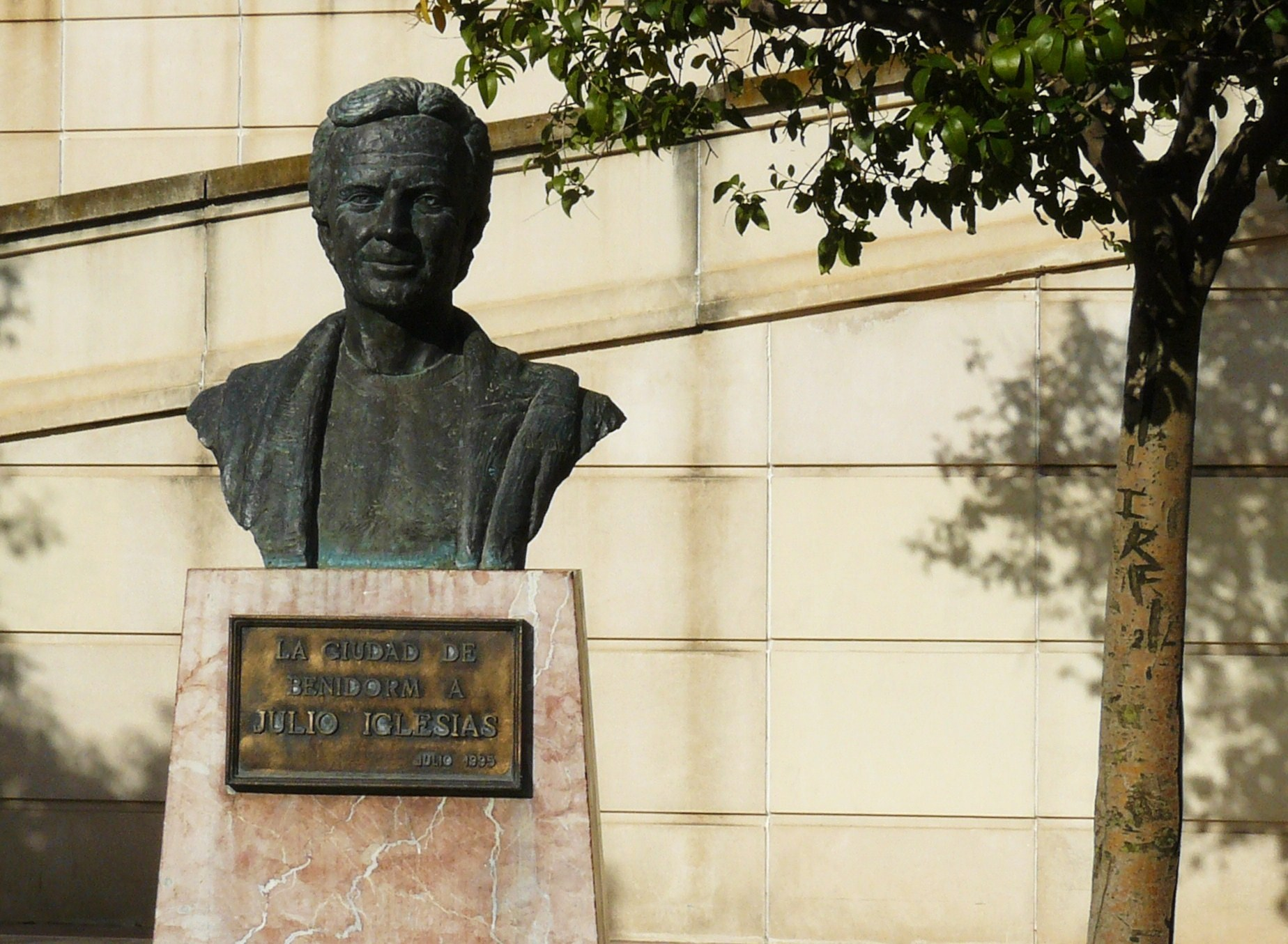
Monument to Julio Iglesias, in Benirdom, Spain

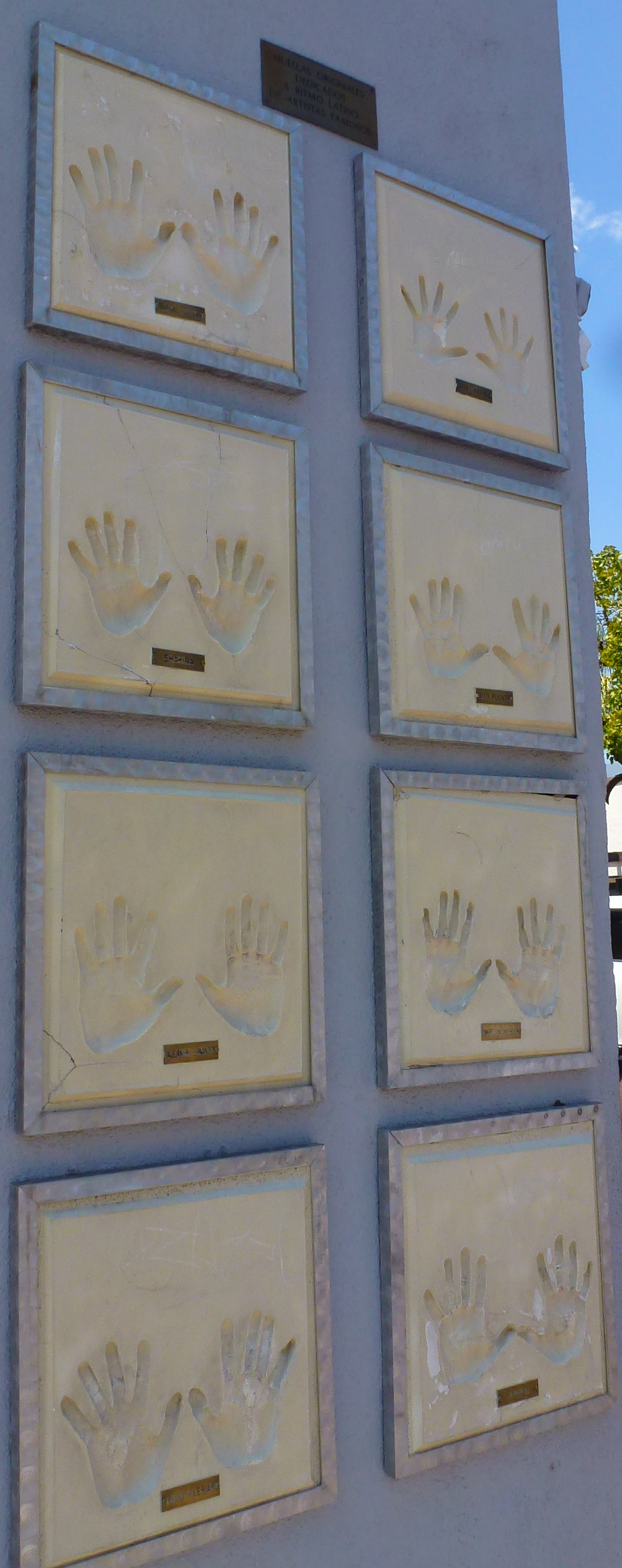
Julio Iglesias' handprints at Ritmo Latino record store in San Fernando Mall

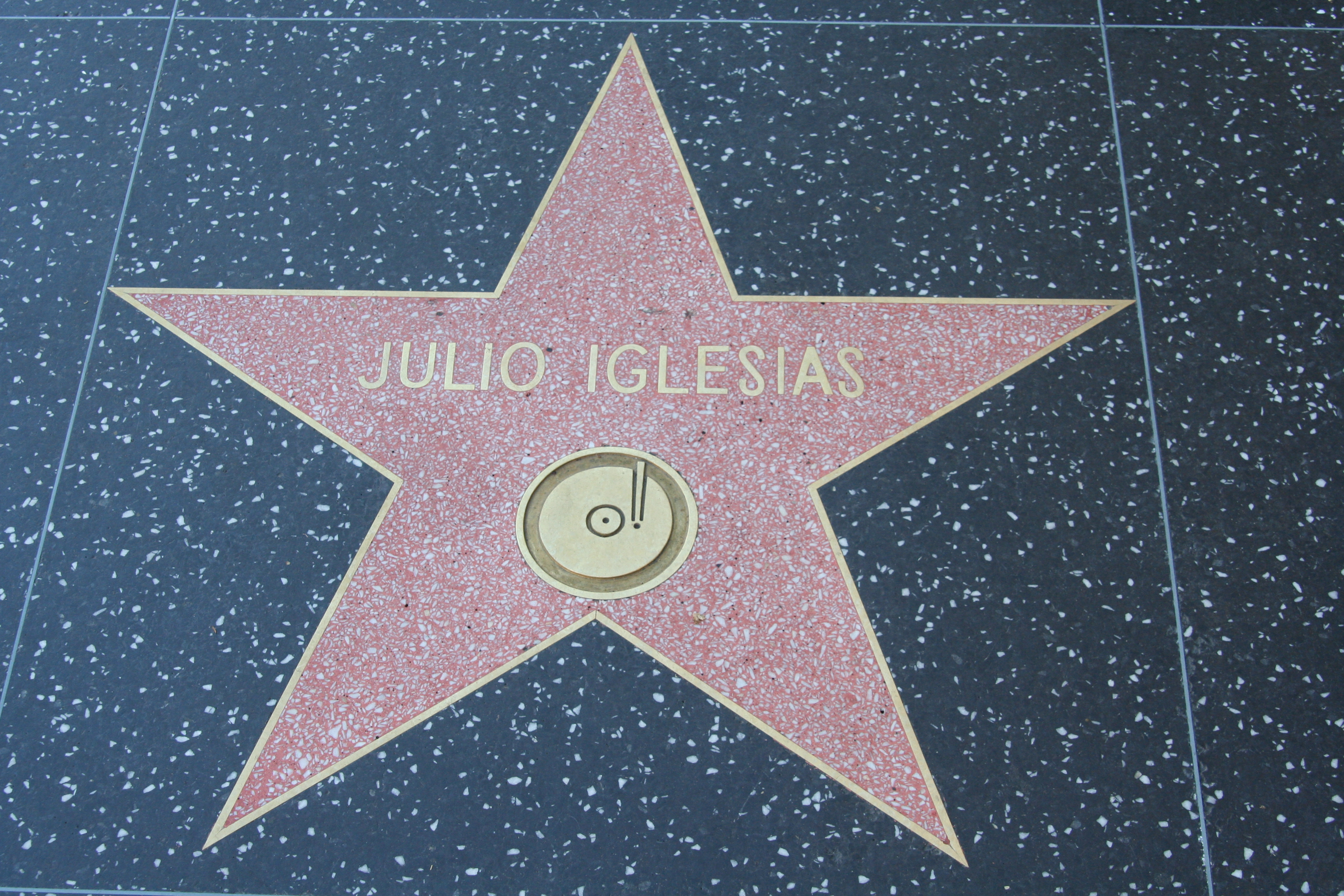
Julio Iglesias' star at the Hollywood Walk of Fame

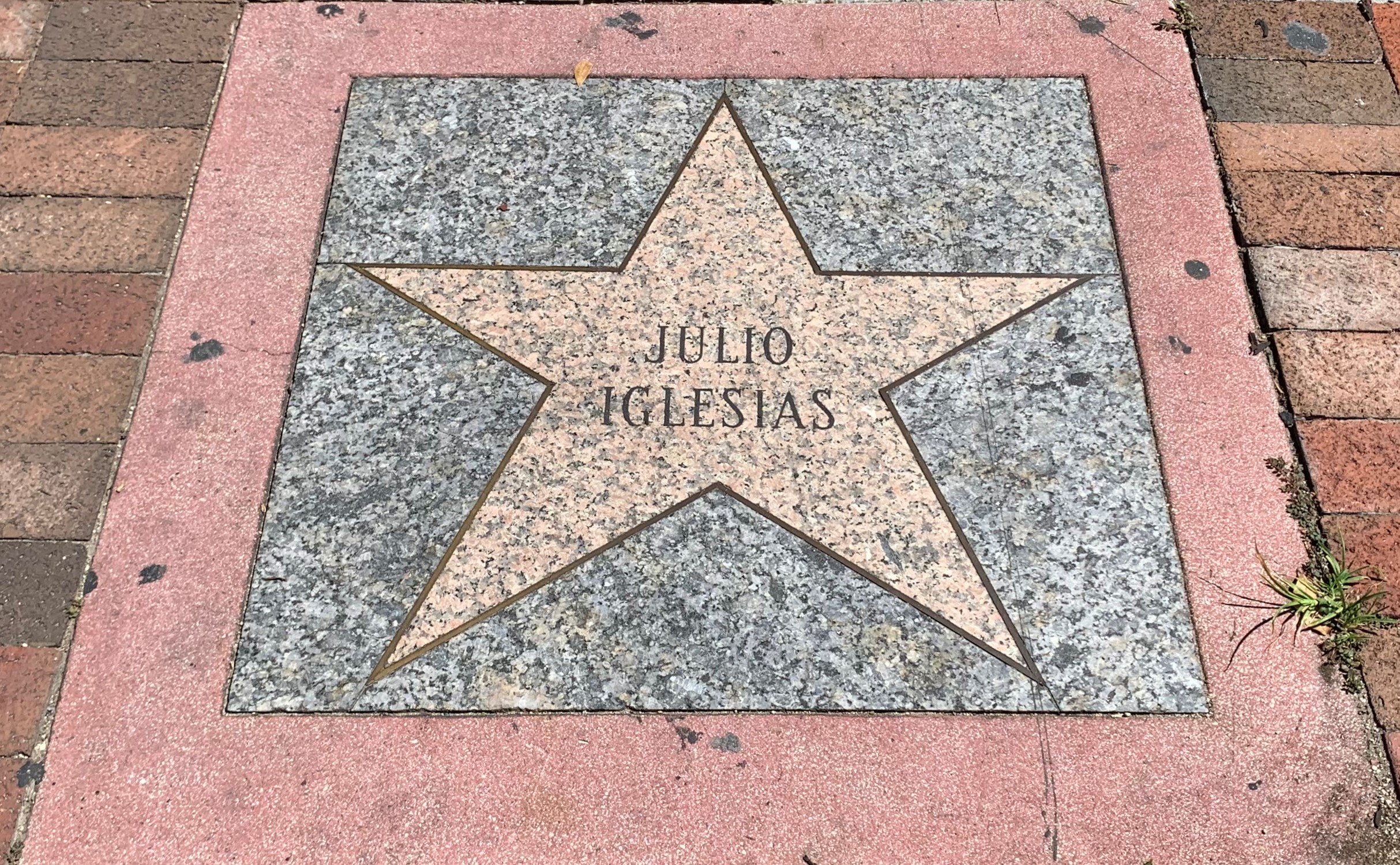
Julio Iglesias' star at the Little Havana (Calle 8) Walk of Fame

List of state honors
Country	City/Gov./Entity	Year	Description	Status	Ref.
France	Mayor of Paris/Jacques Chirac	1983	Medal of the City of Paris	Honoree	
Spain	City of Villarreal	1988	"Hijo adoptivo" de Villarreal (Adopted son of Villareal)	Honoree	
Spain	Xunta de Galicia	1990	Ambassador of Galicia in the World	Honoree	
France	President of France / François Mitterrand	1992	Legion of Honour	Honoree	
France	President of France / Nicolas Sarkozy	2007	Knight Legion of Honour	Honoree	
United States	Spanish Chamber of Commerce in the United States	1992	Español Universal (Spanish Universal Figure)	Honoree	
Spain	Xunta de Galicia	1993	Ambassador of Jacobeo/Xacobeo Culture of the Year	Honoree	
China	Ministry of Culture	1995	Best-selling foreign artist	Honoree	
United States	Mayor of Miami	1997	"Julio Iglesias Day"	Honoree	
Spain	Valencia	1998	Ambassador of Valencia	Honoree	
Spain	Mayor of Lalín/José (Xosé) Crespo	2002	Ambassador of Cocido de Lalín	Honoree	
Chile	Viña del Mar/Mayor Jorge Kaplán	2004	"Hijo ilustre" de Viña (Illustrious Son of Viña)	Honoree	
Romania	City of Sibiu	2007	Gold Medal of the City	Honoree	
Romania	Bacău County	2007	Honorary citizenship	Honoree	
Spain	Deputation of Málaga	2009	Hijo Adoptivo de Málaga (Adopted son of Málaga)	Honoree	
Mexico	Quintana Roo/Governor Félix González Canto	2009	Distinguished Guest	Honoree	
Dominican Republic	City of Santo Domingo/Mayor Roberto Salcedo Sr.	2009	Heraldic shield	Honoree	
Spain	Ministry of Culture	2010	Gold Medal of Merit in the Fine Arts	Honoree	
Bahrain	Bahrain's King Hamad bin Isa Al Khalifa	2012	Bahrain's Medal of Competency	Honoree	
Spain	Community of Madrid	2012	Gold Medal of the City	Honoree	
Argentina	Province of Tandil/Governor Daniel Scioli	2012	Special recognition: Atahualpa Yupanqui	Honoree	
Argentina	Province of Lomas de Zamora/Intendent Martín Insaurralde	2012	Keys to the city	Honoree	
Argentina	Province of Lomas de Zamora/Intendent Martín Insaurralde	2012	Decree Illustrious Visitor	Honoree	
Romania	Municipality of Transylvania	2013	Transylvanian Gold Medal of Arts	Honoree	
Spain	City Council of Madrid	2015	Favorite son of Madrid	Honoree	
Spain	Order of Isabella the Catholic	Kingdom of Spain	Grand Cross (Gran Cruz) Order of Isabella the Catholic	Honoree	

List of academic honors
University	Year	Description	Status	Ref.
New World School of the Arts	1989	International Honorary Professor of Music	Honoree	
Berklee College of Music	2015	Honorary Doctorate of Music	Honoree	

List of Walk of Fame/Hall of Fames
Walk of Fame	Year	Description	Status	Ref.
Hollywood Walk of Fame	1985	Walk of Star	Won	
Nagoya Walk of Fame	1989	Walk of Star	Won	
Little Havana's Stars of Fame	1990	Walk of Star	Won	
Scheveningen Stars of Fame	1991	Walk of Star	Won	
The Hispanic Music and Entertainment Hall of Fame	1993	Hall of Fame inductee	Won	
Santo Domingo Boulevard of Stars (Dominican Republic)	1998	Walk of Star	Won	
Venezuela Walk of Fame	2001	Walk of Star	Won	
International Latin Music Hall of Fame	2002	Hall of Fame inductee	Won	
Munich Olympic Walk of Stars	2003	Walk of Star	Won	
Latin Songwriters Hall of Fame	2013	Hall of Fame inductee	Won	
Puerto Rico Walk of Fame	2016	Walk of Star	Won	
Puerto Banus Boulevard of Fame		Walk of Star	Won	
