= List of number-one albums of 1983 (Spain) =

The List of number-one albums of 1983 in Spain is derived from the Top 100 España record chart published weekly by PROMUSICAE (Productores de Música de España), a non-profit organization composed by Spain and multinational record companies. This association tracks record sales (physical and digital) in Spain.

== Albums ==
Week	Chart Date	Album	Artist
1	January 3	Amor de hombre	Mocedades
2	January 10	Amor de hombre	Mocedades
3	January 17	Amor de hombre	Mocedades
4	January 24	Amor de hombre	Mocedades
5	January 31	Amor de hombre	Mocedades
6	February 7	Amor de hombre	Mocedades
7	February 14	Amor de hombre	Mocedades
8	February 21	Amor de hombre	Mocedades
9	February 28	...Famous Last Words...	Supertramp
10	March 7	Another Page	Christopher Cross
11	March 14	Another Page	Christopher Cross
12	March 21	Amor de hombre	Mocedades
13	March 28	Quesquesé se merdé	La Trinca
14	April 4	Killer on the Rampage	Eddy Grant
15	April 11	Quesquesé se merdé	La Trinca
16	April 18	Quesquesé se merdé	La Trinca
17	April 25	Quesquesé se merdé	La Trinca
18	May 2	Quesquesé se merdé	La Trinca
19	May 9	Quesquesé se merdé	La Trinca
20	May 16	Quesquesé se merdé	La Trinca
21	May 23	Fame (B.S.O. de la serie de TV)	The Kids from "Fame"
22	May 30	Fame (B.S.O. de la serie de TV)	The Kids from "Fame"
23	June 6	El Rock de una noche de verano	Miguel Ríos
24	June 13	El Rock de una noche de verano	Miguel Ríos
25	June 20	El Rock de una noche de verano	Miguel Ríos
26	June 27	Entre amigos	Luis Eduardo Aute
27	July 4	El Rock de una noche de verano	Miguel Ríos
28	July 11	¿Dónde está el país de las hadas?	Mecano
29	July 18	¿Dónde está el país de las hadas?	Mecano
30	July 25	El Rock de una noche de verano	Miguel Ríos
31	August 1	Cada loco con su tema	Joan Manuel Serrat
32	August 8	Cada loco con su tema	Joan Manuel Serrat
33	August 15	Crises	Mike Oldfield
34	August 22	Cada loco con su tema	Joan Manuel Serrat
35	August 29	Crises	Mike Oldfield
36	September 5	Crises	Mike Oldfield
37	September 12	Crises	Mike Oldfield
38	September 19	En Concierto	Julio Iglesias
39	September 26	Crises	Mike Oldfield
40	October 3	Flashdance (B.S.O. de la película)	Varios intérpretes
41	October 10	Flashdance (B.S.O. de la película)	Varios intérpretes
42	October 17	Synchronicity	The Police
43	October 24	Flashdance (B.S.O. de la película)	Varios intérpretes
44	October 31	Flashdance (B.S.O. de la película)	Varios intérpretes
45	November 7	Flashdance (B.S.O. de la película)	Varios intérpretes
46	November 14	Flashdance (B.S.O. de la película)	Varios intérpretes
47	November 21	Flashdance (B.S.O. de la película)	Varios intérpretes
48	November 28	Flashdance (B.S.O. de la película)	Varios intérpretes
49	December 5	Flashdance (B.S.O. de la película)	Varios intérpretes
50	December 12	Flashdance (B.S.O. de la película)	Varios intérpretes
51	December 19	Caballo de batalla	Juan Pardo
52	December 26	Caballo de batalla	Juan Pardo

== See also ==
- List of number-one singles of 1983 (Spain)
