= A flor de piel =

A flor de piel may refer to:

- A flor de piel (album), a 1974 album by Julio Iglesias
- A flor de piel (TV series), a 1994 Mexican telenovela
- A flor de piel (1990 film), a 1990 film by Marcos Zurinaga
- A flor de piel (short film), a 1975 short film by Luis Eduardo Aute
