= Amor (Julio Iglesias album) =

Studio album by Julio Iglesias
- Released: 1982
- Label: CBS

Julio Iglesias chronology
Momenti (1982)	Amor (1982)	Et l'amour crea la femme (1982)

Amor (Love) is a 1982 CBS album by Julio Iglesias. It charted in the UK at No. 14 in 1983.

== Track listing ==
1. "Amor" – Gabriel Ruiz, Norman Newell, Ricardo López 3:20
2. So Close To Me – Julio Iglesias, Norman Newell, Rafael Ferro 3:35
3. Momentos y – Julio Iglesias, Ramón Arcusa, Tony Renis 3:33
4. La Paloma – Traditional Julio Iglesias, Ramón Arcusa 4:54
5. Las Cosas Que Tiene La Vida Danny Daniel 3:30
6. Nathalie Julio Iglesias, Ramón Arcusa 3:57
7. Quijote – Gianni Belfiore, Julio Iglesias, Manuel De La Calva, Ramón Arcusa 4:01
8. L'Amour Fragile – Pierre Carrel, Ray Girado 3:24
9. No Me Vuelvo A Enamorar – Fernán Martínez, Julio Iglesias, Ramón Arcusa 3:48
10. Con La Misma Piedra – Massias (Ketepao) 3:58
11. Esa Mujer – Fernán Martínez, Julio Iglesias, Rafael Ferro, Ramón Arcusa 4:06
12. Si El Amor Llama A Tu Puerta – Ray Girado 3:36

== Certifications ==
Region	Certification	Certified units/sales
United Kingdom (BPI)	Gold	100,000^{^}
^{^} Shipments figures based on certification alone.
