= Aimer la vie =

Studio album by Julio Iglesias
- Released: 1978
- Genre: French pop
- Length: 35:48
- Language: French, etc.
- Label: CBS

Julio Iglesias chronology
A mis 33 años (1977)	Aimer la vie (1978)	Emociones (1978)

Singles from Aimer la vie
- 1. "Aimer la vie" Released: 1978; 2. "Le monde est fou, le monde est beau" Released: 1978

Professional ratings
Review scores
Source	Rating
AllMusic	4.5/5 stars

Aimer la vie is a French-language studio album by Julio Iglesias, released in 1978 on CBS.

== Track listing ==
No.	Title	Writer(s)	Length
1.	"Aimer la vie (Soy un truhan, soy un senor)"	Ramón Arcusa / Manuel de la Calva / Julio Iglesias / Claude Lemesle	3:14
2.	"Une chanson sentimentale (Un gorrion sentimental)"	Mario Balducci / Giovanni Belfiore	3:45
3.	"Ne t'en va pas je t'aime (Si me dejas no vale)"		2:25
4.	"Amigo (Francais)"	Rafael Pérez Botija / Claude Lemesle	4:33
5.	"Tendre voleur (Goodbye amore mio)"	Mario Balducci / Giovanni Belfiore	3:40
6.	"Le monde est fou, le monde est beau (A veces tu, a veces to)"	Julio Iglesias / Claude Lemesle	2:56
7.	"À la croisée des chemins (Seguire mi Camino)"	Julio Iglesias / Claude Lemesle / Dino Ramos	3:15
8.	"Mes trente trois ans (33 anos)"	Julio Iglesias	3:48
9.	"J'ai besoin de toi (Cada dia mas)"	Ramón Arcusa / Manuel de la Calva / Claude Lemesle	3:11
10.	"Stai (Limelight)"	Giovanni Belfiore / Charlie Chaplin	5:01
Total length:			35:48

== Certifications ==
Region	Certification	Certified units/sales
Canada (Music Canada)	Gold	50,000^{^}
France (SNEP)	2× Platinum	740,000
^{^} Shipments figures based on certification alone.
