= Julio Iglesias meme =

Internet meme featuring Julio Iglesias

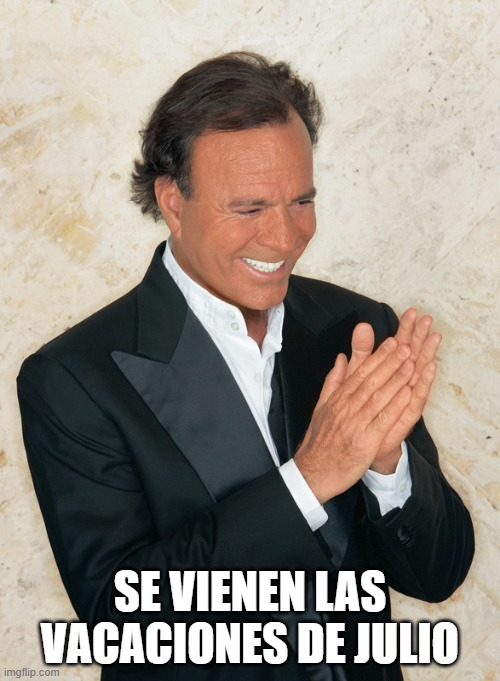
A usual example of the meme

The Julio Iglesias meme is based on the similarity in the Spanish language between the name Julio and the month of July. The internet meme is based on a double entendre where the image shows something about Julio Iglesias, and the text says something about the month or the date instead. For example, an image of Julio Iglesias with the Two of Hearts card, that reads "This is the Two of Julio", published on July 2.

== Usage ==
The meme is usually posted on social networks such as Facebook, X, Instagram and TikTok during the month of July, but may still be used at other moments of the year. Variations of the meme use stock photos of Julio Iglesias, the most popular one is a photo where he smiles and points to the camera. Other popular memes superimpose the head of Julio Iglesias in an otherwise unrelated photo, such as a kid going to school, which is described as "the first day of Julio". The meme is used across several countries of Latin America.

== Reactions ==
The magazine ¡Hola! asked Julio Iglesias about the memes, and he said he's aware of them, and that he has no problem with people finding them funny, as long as they are not offensive. There were a few that he did not like, but he considered it a side consequence of internet humor. He was glad that the meme is popular even among teenagers who do not know his music.
