= Et l'amour créa la femme =

Studio album by Julio Iglesias
- Released: 1982
- Genre: Chanson, pop
- Label: CBS, Columbia
- Producer: Ramon Arcusa

Julio Iglesias chronology
Amor (1982)	Et l'amour créa la femme (1982)	Momentos (1982)

Et l'amour créa la femme is a 1982 album by Julio Iglesias.

== Track listing ==
1. "Don Quichotte" (4:02) (Gianni Belfiore, Julio Iglesias, Manuel de la Calva, Michel Jourdan, Pierre Carrel, Ramon Arcusa)
2. "Les Sourires de mes Souvenirs (Momentos)" (3:35) (Iglesias, Arcusa, Claude Lemesle, Tony Renis)
3. "Amor, amor, amor" (3:22) (Gabriel Ruiz, Ricardo Lopez-Mendez, Carrel)
4. "D'abord et Puis" (4:15) (Demetrio Ortiz, Zulema de Mirkin, Carrel)
5. "C'est Bon Tout ça" (3:31) (Carrel, Jourdan, Jeri Sullivan, Morey Amsterdam, Paul Baron)
6. "Et l'Amour Créa la Femme (Si el Amor Llama a Tu Puerta)" (3:37) (Jourdan, Carrel, Ray Girado)
7. "Nostalgie (Nathalie)" (3:56) (Lemesle, Iglesias, Arcusa)
8. "L'amour Fragile" (3:24) (Carrel, Girado)
9. "Ne Me Parle Plus d'Amour (No Me Vuelvo a Enamorar)" (3:49) (Lemesle, Iglesias, Arcusa, Fernan Martinez)
10. "Oh! La La Amour" (3:43) (Carrel, Jorge "Ketepao" Macias)

== Certifications and sales ==
Region	Certification	Certified units/sales
France (SNEP)	Platinum	600,000
