= Quelque chose de France =

Studio album by Julio Iglesias
- Released: 2007
- Length: 41:57
- Language: French, etc.
- Label: Columbia (Sony BMG)

Julio Iglesias chronology
Romantic Classics (2006)	Quelque chose de France (2007)	1 (2011)

Quelque chose de France is a French-language studio album by Julio Iglesias, released in 2007 on Columbia (Sony BMG).

== Track listing ==
No.	Title	Writer(s)	Length
1.	"Donner"	Fred Blondin	3:51
2.	"De vous à moi"	Lionel Florence / Pascal Obispo	3:24
3.	"Quelque chose de France"	Didier Barbelivien	4:18
4.	"Partir quand même"	Jacques Dutronc	3:59
5.	"Des femmes sur le toit du monde"	Didier Barbelivien	3:25
6.	"Je me sens bien chez vous"		4:16
7.	"Bandonén"	Didier Barbelivien	3:55
8.	"L'Ombre de toi"	Didier Barbelivien	2:58
9.	"L'Existence se danse"	Rubén Fuentes	2:53
10.	"Mal acostumbrado"	Meg Evans	5:04
11.	"Te invito"	Julio Iglesias / Roberto Livi / Jorge Luís Piloto / Rudy Pérez	3:54
Total length:			41:57

== Charts ==
Chart (2007)	Peak position
Belgian Albums (Ultratop Wallonia)	22
French Albums (SNEP)	14
