= 1 (Julio Iglesias album) =

Studio album by Julio Iglesias
- Released: 2011
- Recorded: 147:47
- Genre: Latin pop, pop
- Language: English, Spanish, Portuguese, French
- Label: Sony Music Latin

Julio Iglesias chronology
Quelque chose de France (2007)	1 (2011)	1: The Collection (2014)

Professional ratings
Review scores
Source	Rating
AllMusic	(review for 1: Volume 1 with 15 tracks)

1, or 1: Greatest Hits, is a double studio album by Julio Iglesias, released in 2011 on Sony Music Latin.

The album contains newly recorded versions of selected Julio Iglesias' hits. The overall arrangements of the new recordings are very similar to the originals.

== Track listing ==
=== Disc 1 ===
No.	Title	Writer(s)	Length
1.	"Begin the Beguine"	Julio Iglesias / Cole Porter
2.	"Crazy"	Willie Nelson
3.	"When I Need You"	Albert Hammond / Carole Bayer Sager
4.	"Vincent (Starry, Starry Night)"	Don McLean
5.	"99 Miles from L.A."	Hal David / Albert Hammond
6.	"And I Love Her"	John Lennon / Paul McCartney
7.	"Always On My Mind"	Wayne Carson / Johnny Christopher / Mark James
8.	"Crazy in Love"	Randy McCormick / Even Stevens
9.	"Fragile"	Sting
10.	"To All the Girls I've Loved Before"	Hal David / Albert Hammond
11.	"All of You"	Albert Hammond / Julio Iglesias / Cynthia Weil
12.	"My Love"	Stevie Wonder
13.	"When You Tell Me That You Love Me"	John Bettis / Albert Hammond
14.	"Summer Wind"	Hans Bradtke / Henry Mayer / Johnny Mercer
15.	"Let It Be Me"	Gilbert Bécaud / Manny Curtis / Pierre Delanoë
16.	"As Time Goes By"	Herman Hupfeld
17.	"Se Ora Avessi un Po’ di Te (Uno)"	Giovanni Belfiore / Enrique Santos Discépolo / Mariano Mores
18.	"Dizem Que Os Homens Nao Devem Chorar"	Fernando Adour / Pepe Avila / Mario Zan
19.	"La Vie Defile en Silence (Como Han Pasado Los Anos)"	Rafael Ferro / Roberto Livi / Bernard Saint-Paul

=== Disc 2 ===
No.	Title	Writer(s)	Length
1.	"Hey"	Ramón Arcusa / Mario Balducci / Giovanni Belfiore / Julio Iglesias	5:08
2.	"Por El Amor De Una Mujer"	Danny Daniel / Sonny Marti	3:53
3.	"Me Va, Me Va"	Ricardo Ceratto / Albert Hammond	4:42
4.	"Un Canto a Galicia"	Julio Iglesias	3:51
5.	"El Dia Que Me Quieras"	Carlos Gardel / Alfredo Le Pera	3:02
6.	"Me Olvide de Vivir"	Pierre Billon / Julio Iglesias / Jacques Revaux	4:47
7.	"Corazon Partio"	Alejandro Sanz	4:52
8.	"De Nina a Mujer"	Ramón Arcusa / Carlos Enterria / Julio Iglesias / Tony Renis	3:06
9.	"La Carretera"	Rafael Ferro / Roberto Livi	4:55
10.	"Amor, Amor, Amor"	Ricardo Lopez / Gabriel Ruíz	3:22
11.	"Derroche"	Manuel de Jesús Jiménez Ortega	3:37
12.	"La Cumparsita"	Pascual Contursi / Enrique Pedro Maroni / Gerardo Hernán Matos Rodriguez	2:34
13.	"Nathalie"	Ramón Arcusa / Julio Iglesias	3:54
14.	"Caballo Viejo / Bamboleo"	Ramón Arcusa / Tonino Baliardo / Jahloul "Chico" Bouchikhi / Simon Díaz / Nicolás Reyes	4:50
15.	"El Amor"	Patricia Carli / Jacques Ferrière / Daniel Guichard / Julio Iglesias	3:06
16.	"Caruso"	Lucio Dalla	5:52
17.	"Devaneios (O Me Quieres o Me Dejas)"	Erasmo Estévez / Luis Gardey	3:38
18.	"Quelque Chose de France"	Didier Barbelivien	4:15

== Charts ==
=== Weekly charts ===
Chart (2012–2014)	Peak position
Belgian Albums (Ultratop Flanders)	1
Danish Albums (Hitlisten)	5
Irish Albums (IRMA)	49
New Zealand Albums (RMNZ)	15
Portuguese Albums (AFP)	18
Scottish Albums (OCC)	31
Spanish Albums (Promusicae)	3
Swiss Albums (Schweizer Hitparade)	84
UK Albums (OCC)	18
US Top Latin Albums (Billboard)	12
US Latin Pop Albums (Billboard)	5

=== Year-end charts ===
Chart (2012)	Position
Belgian Albums (Ultratop Flanders)	46

== Certifications and sales ==
Region	Certification	Certified units/sales
Colombia	—	100,000
Spain (Promusicae)	Platinum	40,000^{^}
^{^} Shipments figures based on certification alone.
