= Momenti =

Studio album by Julio Iglesias
- Released: 1982
- Language: Italian
- Label: CBS
- Producer: Ramón Arcusa

Julio Iglesias chronology
Momentos (1982)	Momenti (1982)	1100 Bel Air Place (1984)

Momenti is a 1982 album by Julio Iglesias recorded in Italian. Music arranged by Ramón Arcusa and Rafael Ferro. Italian lyrics by Gianni Belfiore. In 1985 it was reported by the Canadian Recording Industry Assn. (CRIA) that Antonio Crispino was tried following a police investigation into the ordering and distribution of counterfeit copies of Momenti.

== Track listing ==
=== Side A ===
1. Sono Un Vagabondo (4:01)
2. La Donna Che Voglio (4:06)
3. Bella Bella (3:27)
4. Momenti (3:33)
5. Amor, Amor, Amor (3:20)

=== Side B ===
1. Nathalie (3:54)
2. Se L'Amore Se Ne Va (3:48)
3. Venezia A Settembre (4:38)
4. Avanti Tutta (3:36)
5. Arrangiati Amore (3:18)

== Charts ==
=== Weekly charts ===
Weekly chart performance for Momenti
Chart (1982–83)	Peak position
Australian Albums (Kent Music Report)	93
Italian Albums (AFI)	1

=== Year-end charts ===
1982 year-end chart performance for Momenti
Chart (1982)	Position
Italian Albums (AFI)	5

== Certifications ==
Region	Certification	Certified units/sales
Italy (AFI)	Platinum	500,000
