= Julio (album) =

Greatest hits album by Julio Iglesias
- Released: 1983
- Recorded: 1981–1983
- Genre: Latin pop
- Language: Spanish, English, French, Italian, Portuguese, German
- Label: CBS (Columbia)

Julio Iglesias chronology
Momentos (1982)	Julio (1983)	1100 Bel Air Place (1984)

Professional ratings
Review scores
Source	Rating
AllMusic	3.5/5 stars

Julio is a best-of compilation album by Julio Iglesias. It was released in 1983 on CBS. The album covers the period from 1981 to 1983. According to the Guinness World Records, Julio is the first foreign language album to sell more than two million in the United States.

It contains songs in multiple languages.

== Reception ==
In the United States Julio peaked at number 32 on the Billboard 200 chart for the week of May 21, 1983. On August 17, 1984, it was certified platinum by the Recording Industry Association of America (RIAA) for shipments of one million copies in the country.

== Track listing ==
Julio — International edition
No.	Title	Language	Length
1.	"Non Si Vive Cosi" ("Can't Live Like This")	Italian	4:45
2.	"Amor"	Spanish/English	3:20
3.	"Abraçame" ("Wrap Your Arms Around Me")	Portuguese	3:35
4.	"Ou Est Passée Ma Boheme?" ("Carefree Days")	French	3:53
5.	"Volver A Empezar" ("Begin The Beguine")	Spanish	4:43
6.	"Hey"	English	3:50
7.	"Nostalgie" ("Nostalgia")	French	3:55
8.	"La Paloma" ("The Dove")	Spanish	4:54
9.	"Wo Bist Du" ("Where Are You")	German	3:27
10.	"De Niña A Mujer" ("Childhood To Womanhood")	Spanish	3:18
Total length:			39:11

Julio — Brazilian edition
No.	Title	Language	Length
1.	"Essa Mulher"	Portuguese	4:07
2.	"Querer y Perder"	Spanish	3:20
3.	"Espera"	Portuguese	4:12
4.	"Coimbra"	Portuguese	2:37
5.	"Forever And Ever (And Ever)"	English	2:34
6.	"Somos"	Portuguese	3:43
7.	"To All The Girls I've Loved Before"	English	3:30
8.	"Pelo Amor De Uma Mulher"	Portuguese	3:02
9.	"Si, Madame"	Spanish	3:02
10.	"Amantes"	Portuguese	3:15
Total length:			33:22

== Charts ==
=== Weekly charts ===
Weekly chart performance for Julio
Chart (1983–84)	Peak position
Japanese Albums (Oricon)	32
UK Official Charts Company	5
US Billboard 200	32
US Billboard Country Albums	41
Chart (1994)	Peak position
US Billboard Latin Pop	4
US Billboard Top Latin Albums	6

=== Year-end charts ===
Year-end chart performance for Julio
Chart (1984)	Position
Brazilian Albums (Nopem)	27

== Certifications and sales ==
Region	Certification	Certified units/sales
Australia (ARIA)	Gold	35,000^{^}
Brazil (Pro-Música Brasil)	2× Platinum	500,000
Canada (Music Canada)	Platinum	100,000^{^}
France (SNEP)	Platinum	300,000^{*}
Japan	—	38,980
United Kingdom (BPI)	Gold	100,000^{^}
United States (RIAA)	2× Platinum	2,000,000^{^}
^{*} Sales figures based on certification alone.^{^} Shipments figures based on certification alone.
