= En concierto (Julio Iglesias album) =

En Concierto (Julio Iglesias album)

Live album by Julio Iglesias
- Released: 1983

En Concierto (released in the United States as In Concert) is a 1983 album by Julio Iglesias.

== Certifications ==
Region	Certification	Certified units/sales
Australia (ARIA)	Gold	35,000^{^}
Japan	—	32,330
United States (RIAA)	2× Platinum (Latin)	200,000^{^}
Summaries
Worldwide	—	2,000,000
^{^} Shipments figures based on certification alone.
