= A flor de piel (album) =

A Flor de Piel

Studio album by Julio Iglesias
- Released: 1974
- Recorded: 1973–1974
- Studio: Estudios Eurosonic
- Genre: Latin pop
- Label: Columbia Records
- Producer: Julio Iglesias

Julio Iglesias chronology
Und das Meer singt sein Lied (1973)	A Flor de Piel (1974)	Ich schick' dir eine weiße Wolke (1974)

Singles from A flor de piel
- 1. "A flor de piel" Released: 1974; 2. "Manuela" Released: 1974

A Flor de Piel (Close to the Skin) is 1974 album by Julio Iglesias. The LP was released in the United States in October 1974. A month later, Billboard noted major sales of the album in Miami, New York, Chicago and Puerto Rico.

== Track listing ==
No.	Title	Writer(s)	Length
1.	"A flor de piel"	Julio Iglesias, Rafael Ferro	3:40
2.	"Vivir"	Danny Daniel, Donna Hightower, Evangelina "Cecilia" Galanes, Julio Iglesias	3:01
3.	"Dicen"	Iglesias, Luis Franch	3:46
4.	"Manuela"	Ana Magdalena, Manuel Alejandro	3:21
5.	"Un adios a media voz"	Galanes, Iglesias, Ferro	3:30
6.	"Te quiero así"	Dan Mac Clean, José Manuel Vidal Zapater	3:26
7.	"Por el amor de una mujer"	Danny Daniel, Sonny Martí	3:47
8.	"Desde que tu te has ido"	Galanes	3:13
9.	"Aún me queda la esperanza"	Juan Erasmo Mochi, Ferro	2:39
10.	"En cualquier parte"	Eddie Seago, Mike Leander	2:49

== Certifications and sales ==
Region	Certification	Certified units/sales
Mexico	—	300,000

== Sources and external links ==
- Julio Iglesias Discography
