= Emociones (Julio Iglesias album) =

Studio album by Julio Iglesias
- Released: November 7, 1978
- Recorded: 1978
- Studio: Sonoland (Madrid); Criteria Studios (Miami); CBS Studios (New York)
- Length: 37:40
- Language: Spanish; Italian; French
- Label: CBS Records Discos CBS
- Producer: Ramón Arcusa

Julio Iglesias chronology
Aimer la vie (1978)	Emociones (1978)	Sono un pirata, sono un signore (1978)

Emociones (Emotions) is a 1978 album by Spanish singer Julio Iglesias.

== Track listing ==
All tracks produced by Ramón Arcusa.

Professional ratings
Review scores
Source	Rating
AllMusic	3.5/5 stars

Emociones — Spanish edition
No.	Title	Writer(s)	Length
1.	"Me olvidé de vivir (J'ai oublié de vivre)"	P. Billon; J. Revaux; J. Iglesias; M. Díaz; M. Kormann; M. de la Calva; R. Arcusa; J. Flores	4:51
2.	"Voy a perder la cabeza por tu amor"	M. Alejandro; A. Magdalena	4:37
3.	"Spanish Girl"	Iglesias; de la Calva; Arcusa	3:39
4.	"Pobre diablo"	Iglesias; de la Calva; Arcusa	2:55
5.	"Quiéreme (Basada en las Danzas Polovsianas de El Principe Igor)"	Borodin; Iglesias; de la Calva; Arcusa	2:48
6.	"Pregúntale"	Iglesias; de la Calva; Arcusa	4:55
7.	"Quiéreme mucho"	Gonzalo Roig	4:02
8.	"Con una pinta así"	Iglesias; J.L. Navarro; de la Calva; Arcusa	3:23
9.	"No vengo ni voy"	D. Ramos; Iglesias	3:26
10.	"Un día tú, un día yo"	P. Trim; de la Calva; Arcusa; Iglesias	3:04
Total length:			37:40

Innamorarsi Alla Mia Età — Italian edition
No.	Title	Writer(s)	Italian lyrics	Length
1.	"Non Si Vive Così (J'ai oublié de vivre)"	Billon; Revaux	Gianni Belfiore	4:47
2.	"Innamorarsi Alla Mia Età (Voy a perder la cabeza por tu amor)"	Alejandro; Magdalena	Belfiore	5:09
3.	"Quasi Un Santo (Pobre diablo)"	Iglesias; de la Calva; Arcusa	Belfiore	2:58
4.	"La Nostra Buona Educazione (Viejas tradiciones)"	A. Genovese	Belfiore	3:42
5.	"Un Giorno Tu Un Giorno Io (Un día tú, un día yo)"	P. Trim; de la Calva; Arcusa	Belfiore	3:00
6.	"Se Tornassi (Por un poco de tu amor)"	Hammond; Gómez	Belfiore	2:48
7.	"A Meno Che (Pregúntale)"	Iglesias; de la Calva; Arcusa	Belfiore	4:51
8.	"Quando Si Ama Davvero (Quiéreme mucho)"	Roig	Belfiore	4:15
9.	"Chi Mi Aspettava Non È Più Là (No vengo ni voy)"	Ramos	Belfiore	3:30
10.	"Amo Te (Como tú)"	Trim; de la Calva; Arcusa	Belfiore	3:33
Total length:				38:33

À Vous Les Femmes — French edition
No.	Title	Writer(s)	French lyrics	Length
1.	"Pauvres Diables (Pobre diablo)"	Iglesias; de la Calva; Arcusa	M. Jourdan	2:58
2.	"L'amour C'est Quoi (Pregúntale)"	Iglesias; de la Calva; Arcusa	C. Lemesle	4:49
3.	"Les Traditions (La Nostra Buona Educazione)"	Genovese; Belfiore	Lemesle	3:31
4.	"Je N'ai Pas Changé (No vengo ni voy)"	Ramos; Iglesias	Lemesle	3:29
5.	"Moi Je T'aime (Summer Love)"	Trim; de la Calva; Arcusa	R. Bernet	3:19
6.	"Où Est Passée Ma Bohême? (Quiéreme mucho)"	Roig	Jourdan	3:52
7.	"Le Mal De Toi (Voy a perder la cabeza por tu amor)"	Alejandro; Magdalena	J. Mercury	4:31
8.	"Souriez Madame (Con una pinta asi)"	Iglesias; Navarro; de la Calva; Arcusa	Jourdan	3:31
9.	"Je L'aime Encore (Donde estarás)"	de la Calva; Arcusa	Jourdan	2:55
10.	"Un Jour C'est Toi, Un Jour C'est Moi (Give Me Your Love)"	Trim; de la Calva; Arcusa	Jourdan	3:01
Total length:				35:56

== Personnel ==
Adapted from the Emociones liner notes:

- Pepe Sánchez – drums
- Carlos Villa – electric guitar, acoustic guitar
- Eduardo Leyva – piano, keyboards
- Eduardo Gracia – bass guitar
- Rodrigo – acoustic guitar
- Ramón Arcusa – producer, orchestral arrangements and direction
- Rafael Ferro – orchestral arrangements and direction (track 7)
- Juan Vinader – audio engineer
- Don Gehman – audio engineer
- Don Puluse – audio engineer

== Charts ==
=== Weekly charts ===
Weekly chart performance for Emociones
Chart (1979–82)	Peak position
Argentine Albums (CAPIF)	1
Belgian Albums (Billboard)	1
Dutch Albums (Album Top 100)	1
French Albums Chart (SNEP)	4
Israelian Albums (IBA)	1
Italian Albums (AFI)	1
Japanese Albums (Oricon)	39
Spanish Albums (AFYVE)	11

=== Year-end charts ===
Year-end chart performance for Emociones
Chart (1979)	Position
Dutch Albums (Album Top 100)	8
French Albums Chart (SNEP)	36

Chart (1980)	Position
Italian Albums (AFI)	6

== Sales and certifications ==
Region	Certification	Certified units/sales
Argentina (CAPIF)	12× Platinum	636,294
Australia (ARIA) for Innamorarsi Alla Mia Età	Gold	35,000^{^}
Brazil (Pro-Música Brasil)	3× Platinum	750,000^{*}
Canada (Music Canada) for À Vous Les Femmes	Gold	50,000^{^}
Chile	Gold	
Colombia (ASINCOL)	4× Platinum	240,000
France (SNEP) for À Vous Les Femmes	Diamond	1,200,000
Greece	—	~ 50,000
Italy (AFI) for Innamorarsi Alla Mia Età	—	1,500,000
Japan	—	47,160
Mexico (AMPROFON)	Platinum	250,000^{^}
Netherlands (NVPI)	Platinum	100,000^{^}
Spain (PROMUSICAE)	3× Platinum	300,000^{^}
^{*} Sales figures based on certification alone.^{^} Shipments figures based on certification alone.

== See also ==
- 1970s in Latin music
- List of best-selling albums in Argentina
- List of best-selling albums in France
- List of best-selling albums in Italy
