= A mis 33 años =

Studio album by Julio Iglesias
- Released: September 23, 1977
- Studio: Sonoland (Madrid); Kirios (Madrid)
- Genre: Latin pop
- Length: 33:16
- Label: Alhambra

Julio Iglesias chronology
| America (1976) | A mis 33 años (1977) | Aimer la vie (1978) |

A mis 33 años ("To My 33 Years") is a 1977 album by Julio Iglesias. It was released on the Alhambra label.

== Track listing ==
| No. | Title | Writer(s) | Length |
|---|---|---|---|
| 1. | "Soy un truhán, soy un señor" | Ramón Arcusa | 3:07 |
| 2. | "Sono io" | Julio Iglesias | 4:19 |
| 3. | "Si me dejas no vale (Se mi lasci non vale)" | Julio Iglesias | 2:18 |
| 4. | "Por un poco de tu amor" | Julio Iglesias | 2:58 |
| 5. | "Un gorrión sentimental" | Julio Iglesias | 3:38 |
| 6. | "Seguiré mi camino" | Julio Iglesias | 3:20 |
| 7. | "33 años (33 Years)" | Julio Iglesias | 3:49 |
| 8. | "Cada día más" | Julio Iglesias | 3:13 |
| 9. | "Donde estarás" | Julio Iglesias | 3:06 |
| 10. | "Goodbye amore mio (Goodbye a modo mio)" | Julio Iglesias | 3:28 |

== Charts ==
=== Weekly charts ===
Weekly chart performance for A Mis 33 Años
| Chart (1977–1982) | Peak position |
|---|---|
| Argentine Albums (CAPIF) | 2 |
| Dutch Albums (Album Top 100) | 8 |
| Japanese Albums (Oricon) | 52 |
| Spanish Albums (AFYVE) | 8 |

=== Year-end charts ===
Year-end chart performance for A Mis 33 Años
| Chart (1978) | Position |
|---|---|
| Spanish Albums (AFYVE) | 15 |
| US Latin Pop Albums (Billboard) | 4 |

| Chart (1979) | Position |
|---|---|
| Dutch Albums (Album Top 100) | 39 |

== Certifications and sales ==
| Region | Certification | Certified units/sales |
|---|---|---|
| Argentina (CAPIF) | 2× Platinum | 120,000^{^} |
| Brazil (Pro-Música Brasil) | 2× Platinum | 500,000^{*} |
| Chile | Gold | |
| Colombia | Gold | |
| Greece | — | 50,000 |
| Japan | — | 12,850 |
| Mexico (AMPROFON) | Platinum | 250,000^{^} |
| Netherlands (NVPI) | Gold | 50,000 |
| Spain (Promusicae) | Platinum | 100,000^{^} |
^{*} Sales figures based on certification alone.^{^} Shipments figures based on certification alone.
