= Julio Iglesias =

Spanish singer-songwriter (born 1943)

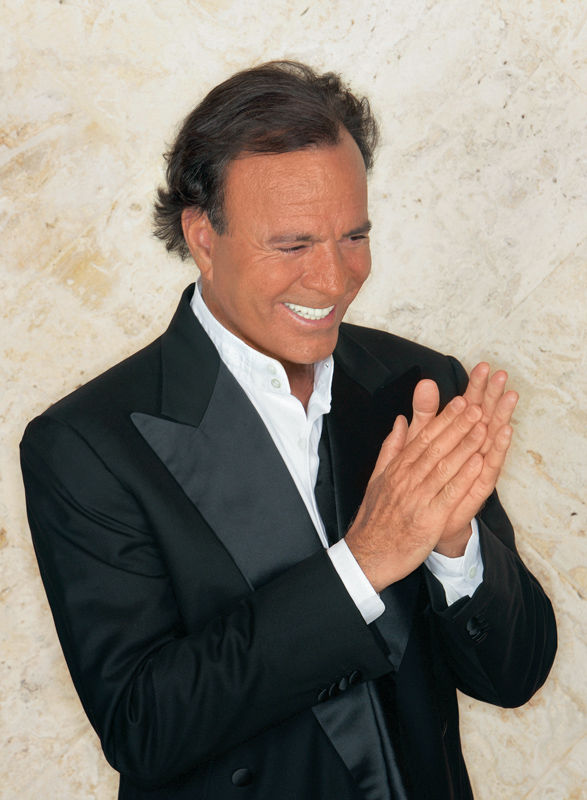
- Iglesias in 2005
- Born: Julio José Iglesias de la Cueva; 23 September 1943 (age 83); Madrid, Spain
- Education: Law degree Complutense University of Madrid
- Occupations: Singer; songwriter; footballer
- Years active: 1968–present
- Spouses: Isabel Preysler (m. 1971; div. 1979) Miranda Rijnsburger (m. 2010)
- Children: 8, including Chábeli, Julio Jr., and Enrique
- Awards: Full list
- Musical career
- Genres: Latin music; Latin pop; Dance-pop; Adult contemporary; Latin ballad
- Labels: Columbia; Sony; Alhambra; CBS
Association football career
- Position: Goalkeeper
Youth career
- Real Madrid
Senior career*
Years	Team	Apps	(Gls)
1960–1964	Plus Ultra		
- * Club domestic league appearances and goals
- Website: julioiglesias.com

Julio José Iglesias de la Cueva (Spanish: [ˈxuljo jˈɣlesjas]; born 23 September 1943) is a Spanish singer and songwriter. Iglesias is recognized as the most commercially successful Spanish singer in the world and one of the top record sellers in music history, having sold more than 300 million records worldwide in 14 languages. It is estimated that during his career he has performed in more than 5,000 concerts, for over 60 million people in six continents. In April 2013, Iglesias was inducted into the Latin Songwriters Hall of Fame.

In 1983, Iglesias was credited as having recorded songs in the most languages in the world, and in 2013 for being the best-selling male Latin artist of all-time. In April 2013 in Beijing, he was honoured as the most popular international artist in China. In Brazil, France, Italy and elsewhere, Iglesias is the most successful foreign record seller, while in his home country, Spain, he has sold the most records in history, with 23 million records.

During his career, Iglesias has won many awards in the music industry, including a Grammy, Latin Grammy, World Music Award, Billboard Music Award, American Music Award and Lo Nuestro Award. He has been awarded the Gold Medal for Merit in the Fine Arts of Spain and the Legion of Honour of France. He represented Spain in the Eurovision Song Contest 1970 with the song "Gwendolyne", finishing in fourth place. UNICEF named him Special Ambassador for the Performing Arts in 1989. He has had a star on the Hollywood Walk of Fame since 1985.

== Early life ==
Iglesias was born in Madrid to Julio Iglesias Puga, a medical doctor from Ourense who became one of the youngest gynecologists in the country, and María del Rosario de la Cueva y Perignat. His paternal grandparents, Manuela Puga Noguerol and Ulpiano Iglesias Sarria, were of Galician ancestry. His maternal grandparents were José de la Cueva y Orejuela and Dolores de Perignat y Ruiz de Benavides, who was a native of Guayama, Puerto Rico.

The name "Iglesias" translates as "churches". Iglesias says that he is of Jewish ancestry on his maternal side, and that his mother's family name, "de la Cueva", meaning literally "of the cave" and referring to Jewish people in hiding, is a common Jewish name.

He alternated playing professional football with studying law at the CEU San Pablo University in Madrid. In his youth, he was a goalkeeper for Real Madrid Castilla in the Segunda División. His professional football career was ruined when he was involved in a serious automobile accident in 1963 that left him unable to walk for two years. The accident smashed his lower spine and left his legs permanently weakened and requiring therapy for several years. He has said of those years, "I had more courage and attitude than talent". While he was in hospital after the accident, a nurse named Eladio Magdaleno gave him a guitar so that he could recover the dexterity of his hands. In learning to play, he discovered his musical talent. After his rehabilitation, Iglesias studied for three months at Bell Educational Trust's Language School in Cambridge, England. In 2001, he returned to obtain his law degree at Complutense University of Madrid.

== Entertainment career ==
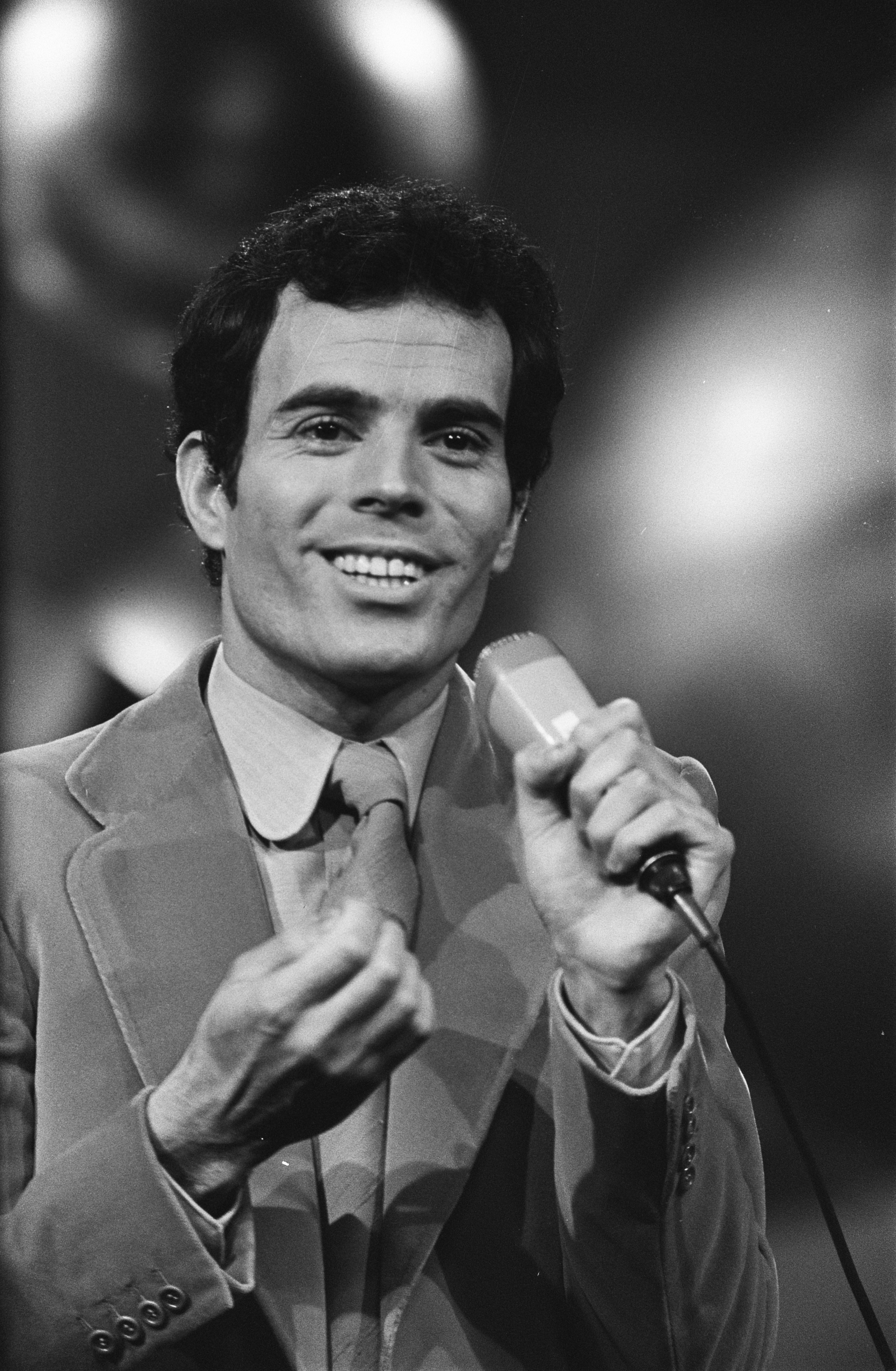
Julio Iglesias performing "Gwendolyne" at the Eurovision Song Contest 1970

In 1968, he won the Benidorm Song Festival with the song "La vida sigue igual" (meaning "Life Goes on the Same") which was used in the 1969 film La vida sigue igual in which he played a fictionalized version of his own life. He then signed a deal with Discos Columbia, the Spanish branch of the Columbia Records company, and released his first studio album, titled Yo Canto. The album spent 15 weeks in the Spanish charts and peaked at No. 3. He represented Spain in the Eurovision Song Contest 1970 in Amsterdam, Netherlands, with the song "Gwendolyne", finishing in fourth place with 8 votes. Shortly after, he had a number one hit in many European countries with "Un canto a Galicia", sung in Galician, in honour of his father, who hailed from Galicia. That single sold one million copies in Germany. In 1975, he found success in the Italian market by recording a song exclusively in Italian, called "Se mi lasci non vale". Notable albums from this decade are A flor de piel (1974, with the European hit "Manuela"), El amor (1975), and Soy (1973). He also sang in French: one of his popular songs in this language became "Je n'ai pas changé".

In 1979, he moved to Miami, United States, signed a deal with CBS International, and started singing in different languages such as French, Italian, Portuguese, and German. Two years later, he released the album De niña a mujer, which he dedicated to his daughter Chabeli, who appeared on the cover with him. From it came the first English-language hit of his career, a cover of "Begin the Beguine" that became number 1 in the United Kingdom; he also released a collection, Julio (1983).

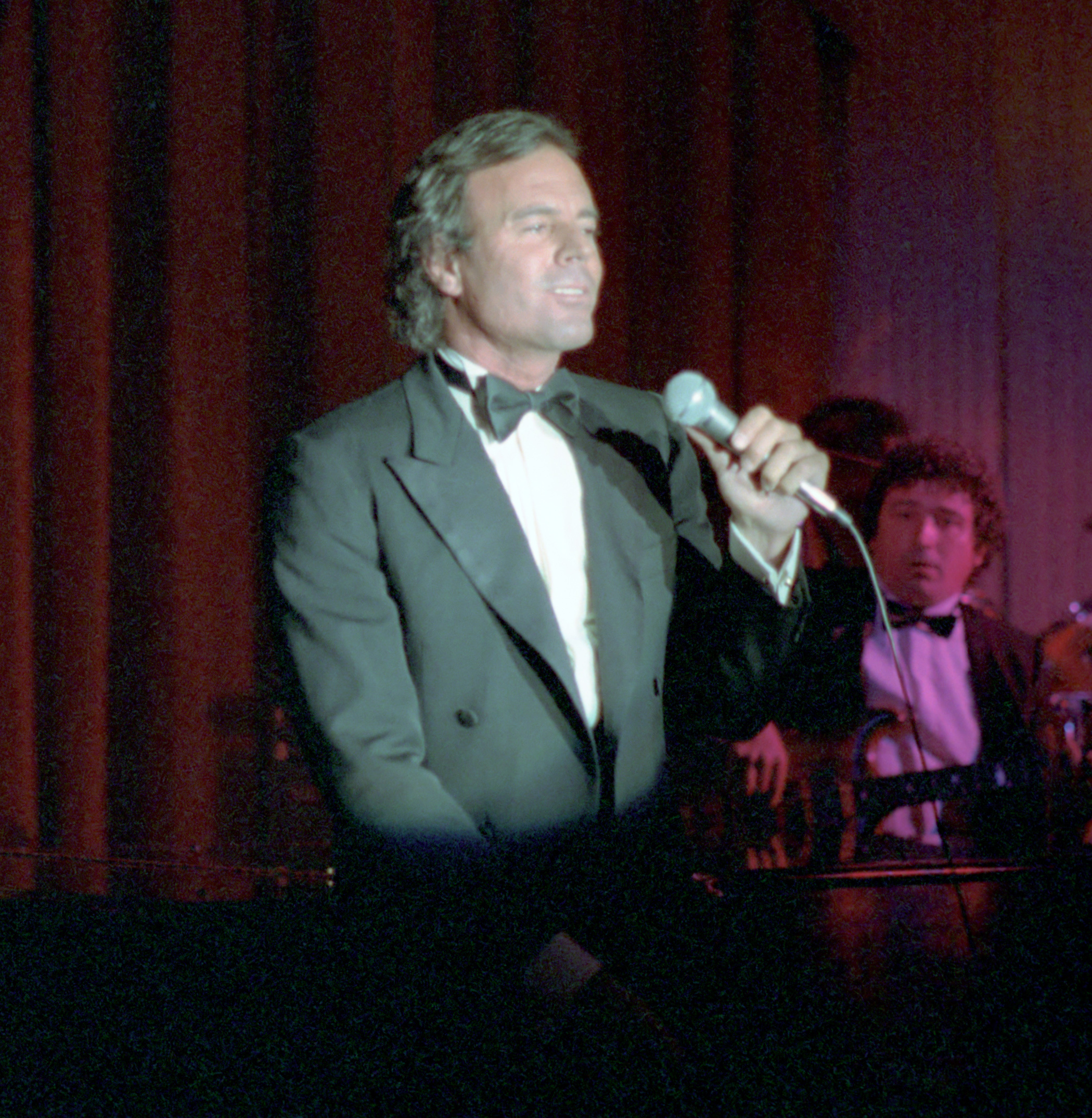
Julio Iglesias performing at the White House in 1984

In 1984, he released 1100 Bel Air Place, the hit album which established him as a star in the English-speaking entertainment industry. It sold over three million albums in the United States alone. The first single, "To All the Girls I've Loved Before", a duet with Willie Nelson, hit No. 1 on the Country charts and went Top Five in the Billboard Hot 100. It also featured "All of You", in vocal duet with Diana Ross, a Top Twenty Pop hit, that climbed to No. 2 on the Adult Contemporary Chart with the help of a popular video. He also covered "The Air That I Breathe", written by Albert Hammond and popularized by The Hollies, on this album; Iglesias's version featured vocals from The Beach Boys.

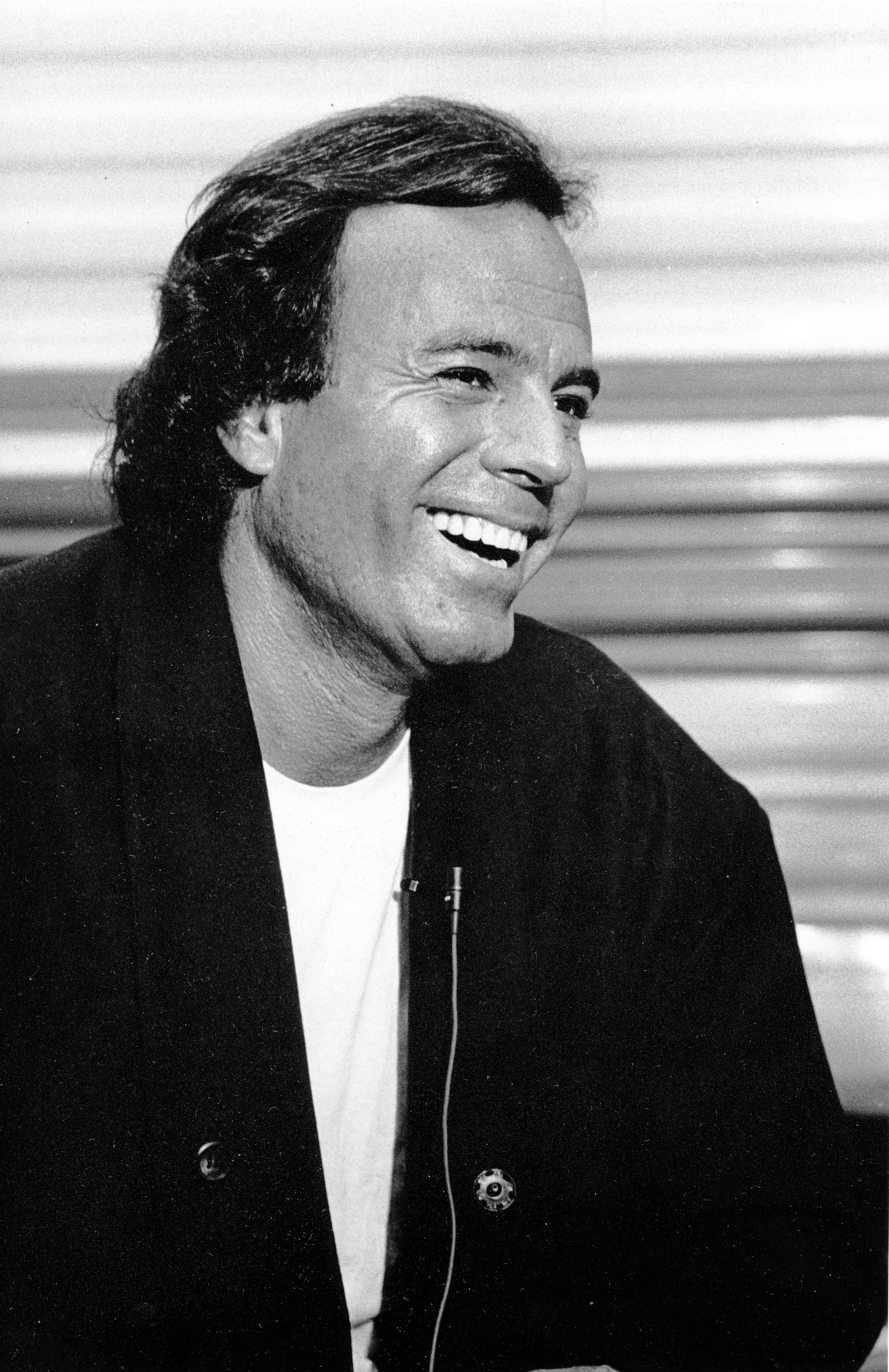
Julio Iglesias during an interview in Boston, United States, around 1984

Iglesias won a Grammy Award for Best Latin Pop Album in the 1988 Grammy Awards for the album Un hombre solo ("A Man Alone"). In that year, he recorded a duet with Stevie Wonder, "My Love", in his Non Stop album, a crossover success in 1988. Iglesias made a cameo appearance as himself on The Golden Girls as Sophia Petrillo's date on St. Valentine's Day 1989. In 1993, he recorded "Summer Wind" with Frank Sinatra. In 1994, released Crazy, including duets with Dolly Parton, Sting and Art Garfunkel. In 1995, Iglesias was the recipient of the Excellence Award at the 1995 Lo Nuestro Awards. In 2001, Iglesias was recognized as the Person of the Year by the Latin Recording Academy. A year later, Iglesias was inducted into the International Latin Music Hall of Fame.

In 2003, Iglesias released his album Divorcio ("Divorce"). In its first day of sales, Divorcio sold a record 350,000 albums in Spain, and reached the number 1 spot on the charts in Spain, Portugal, France, Italy, and Russia. In 2003 and 2004, aided by the success of his Divorcio album, Iglesias went on a ten-month world tour which took him from Europe to Asia and then on to North America, South America and Africa. More than half the shows on that tour sold out within days of going on sale. In December 2004, his Dutch girlfriend Miranda Rijnsburger and Iglesias himself recorded a duet of the Christmas song "Silent Night". The song, which was not officially released, also included a voice message from Iglesias, Rijnsburger, and their four young children. The song was released online through the singer's official website and a CD was included on their Christmas card as a holiday gift from the Iglesias family to their friends and fans around the world.

In 2008, Iglesias recorded another song as a gift to his fans. The family recorded "The Little Drummer Boy" in Spanish and English and included it in the family's Christmas card. Iglesias also made investments in the Dominican Republic's eastern town of Punta Cana, a major tourist destination, where he took to spending most of the year. He became a Dominican citizen in 2005.

In September 2006, Iglesias released a new English-language album, which he titled Romantic Classics. "I've chosen songs from the 1960s, 1970s and 1980s that I believe will come to be regarded as the new standards," Iglesias stated in the album's sleeve notes. The album featured his interpretations of Foreigner's "I Want to Know What Love Is", the George Michael selection "Careless Whisper", and Richard Marx's "Right Here Waiting". Romantic Classics was Iglesias's highest debut on the Billboard charts, entering at number 31 in the United States, 21 in Canada, 10 in Australia, and top spots across Europe and Asia. He returned to the studio to record songs in Filipino and Indonesian for his Asian releases of Romantic Classics, which helped propel record sales in the Asian entertainment industry. Iglesias promoted Romantic Classics in 2006; it was seen all over the world on television shows. In the United States, for example, he appeared on Dancing with the Stars, where he sang his version of "I Want To Know What Love Is", Good Morning America, The View, Fox and Friends and Martha Stewart.

In 2008, Iglesias made a music video with Gulnara Karimova, the daughter of Uzbek dictator Islam Karimov. In October 2012, he performed a concert in Equatorial Guinea where tickets were reportedly $1,000 each.

Iglesias's performance of the song "La Mer" ("The Sea") is featured in the soundtrack of the 2011 film Tinker Tailor Soldier Spy. The performance comes from a live album that he recorded live at the Olympia in 1976.

On 1 April 2013, in Beijing, he received two historic awards: First & Most Popular International Artist of All Time in China, an award given by Sony Music China and which was presented to Iglesias by the world-renowned Chinese artist Lang Lang, and the Guinness World Records for the Best-selling Male Latin Artist. As Iglesias is a composer and lyricist, some of his songs being of his own authorship and composition, on 23 April 2013, he was inducted into the Latin Songwriters Hall of Fame, alongside Armando Manzanero and José Feliciano.

In 2015, Iglesias was slated to perform a complete concert for the first time with his son Julio Iglesias Jr. in a tour in Romania, on 22 May at Sala Polivalentă in Cluj-Napoca and 2 July at Sala Palatului in the capital city, Bucharest.

Berklee College of Music awarded Iglesias an Honorary Doctorate in May 2015 in recognition of his achievements and influence in music and for his enduring contribution to American and international culture.

== Personal life ==
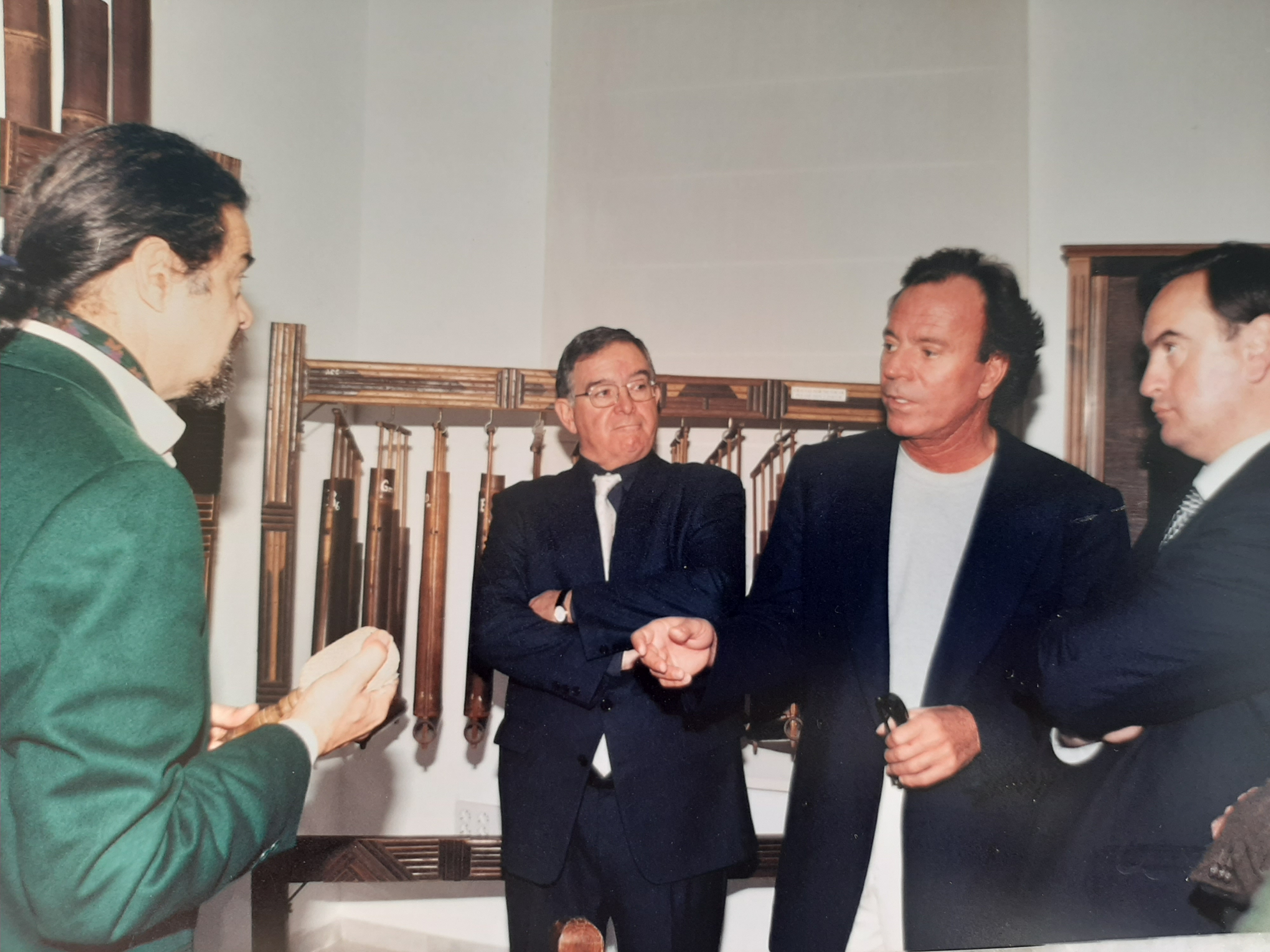
Julio Iglesias in the Museo de la Música Etnica in 2020

On 29 January 1971, Iglesias married Isabel Preysler, a Filipina television host. Preysler, a Filipina of Spanish ancestry, was also a member of the wealthy and aristocratic Pérez de Tagle family. The couple had three children: Chábeli (born 3 September 1971), a socialite; Julio Jr. (born 25 February 1973), a singer; and Enrique (born 8 May 1975), an internationally successful singer-songwriter, actor, and record producer. In the 1970s, Iglesias and his family were extensively depicted on the front pages of international newspapers and magazines. The marriage ended in divorce in 1979. The couple also applied for marriage annulment by the Catholic Church which was granted in 1980.

Whenever Iglesias was not on tour, he spent his time at his Miami residence, purchased in 1978 for $650,000. The mansion on the private Indian Creek Island, whose interior design was made by Virginia Sipl, was placed on the market in 2006 for a quoted $28 million, making it one of the "Ten Most Expensive Homes in the South" in 2006 according to Forbes magazine.

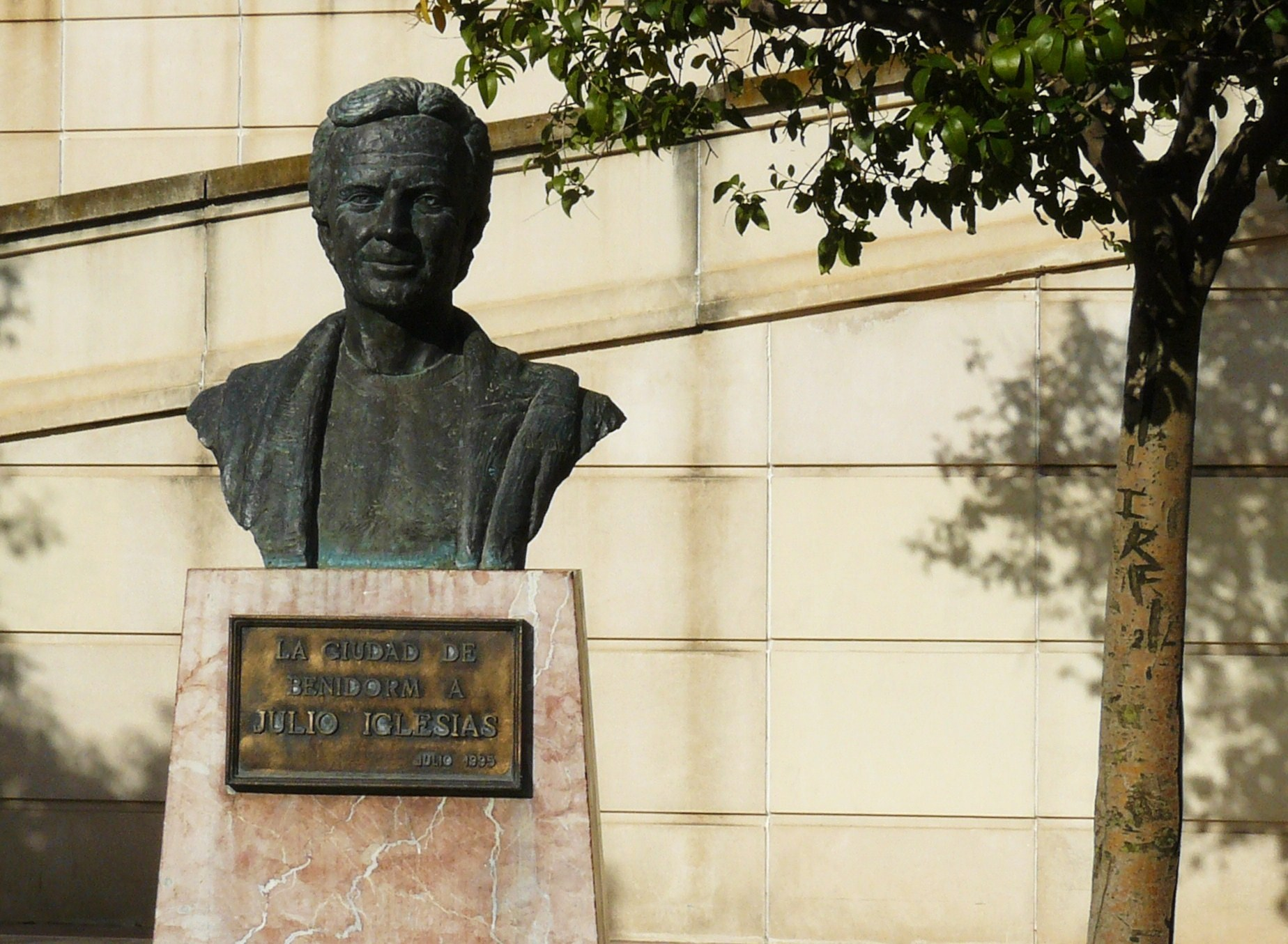
A bust dedicated to Julio Iglesias, in Benidorm, Spain

After his divorce, Iglesias lived with Dutch model Miranda Rijnsburger, 22 years his junior, whom he married on 26 August 2010 in a small church in Marbella, Spain. They had five children: Miguel Alejandro Iglesias (born 7 September 1997), Rodrigo Iglesias (born 3 April 1999), twins Cristina and Victoria Iglesias (born 1 May 2001), and Guillermo Iglesias (born 5 May 2007). They took up residence in the Dominican Republic, where Iglesias had acquired several hotel complexes, as well as the Punta Cana International Airport, which he acquired jointly with other investors, including fashion designer Oscar de la Renta.

On 19 December 2005, Iglesias's father died of a heart attack at the age of 90. A week before his father's death, it became known that Ronna Keitt, his father's 42-year-old wife, was pregnant with their second child. Their first child, Jaime, had been born on 18 May 2004. The second child, Ruth, was born on 26 July 2006.

In 2008, after his house in Indian Creek did not sell at his asking price, he ordered it razed and said he planned to build another on the lot. In 2012, he purchased the property next door for $15 million and announced that he planned to build a new home on the combined properties. In 2020, he agreed to sell it to Jared Kushner and his wife Ivanka Trump, a daughter of U.S. President Donald Trump.

In 2019, a court in Valencia ruled that Iglesias is the father of Javier Sánchez, son of Portuguese former dancer Maria Edite Santos. Sánchez had been pursuing his paternity suit in court since 1992, arguing that he was conceived when his mother allegedly had an affair with Iglesias in the Catalonia region in July 1975. The singer, who rejected all those claims, had refused on several occasions to undergo a paternity test. The Sánchez legal team argued that DNA evidence obtained in the US by an investigator proved their case; however, the DNA sample did not come directly from the singer but was collected from "a bottle of water" used by his son, Julio Iglesias Jr, which he left on a Miami beach. The presiding judge, José Miguel Bort, rejected this DNA claim but ruled in favour of Sánchez. Delivering the verdict, Judge Bort said his decision was reached in part because of the "resemblance between the two men" and on the basis of Edite's testimony. Iglesias appealed the verdict and the Provincial Court of Valencia reversed Judge Bort's ruling, declaring it cannot be proven that Sánchez is the son of Iglesias. The matter was taken to the Supreme Court of the country, and, in April 2021, the Court dismissed the claims made by Sánchez, imposing also the costs of the process on him.

On 13 January 2026, he was accused by two former employees of alleged sexual assault. They said that they had suffered "... inappropriate touching, insults and humiliation … in an atmosphere of control and constant harassment". On 16 January, Iglesias denied the allegations, saying that "(he has) never abused, coerced or disrespected any woman", adding that they were "false and painful." His employees were forced to have tests for AIDS and chlamydia. The charges were dropped by Spanish prosecutors on 23 January, after they concluded that the Audiencia Nacional did not have jurisdiction in the case, which occurred at his residences in the Dominican Republic and the Bahamas.

== Honours and awards ==
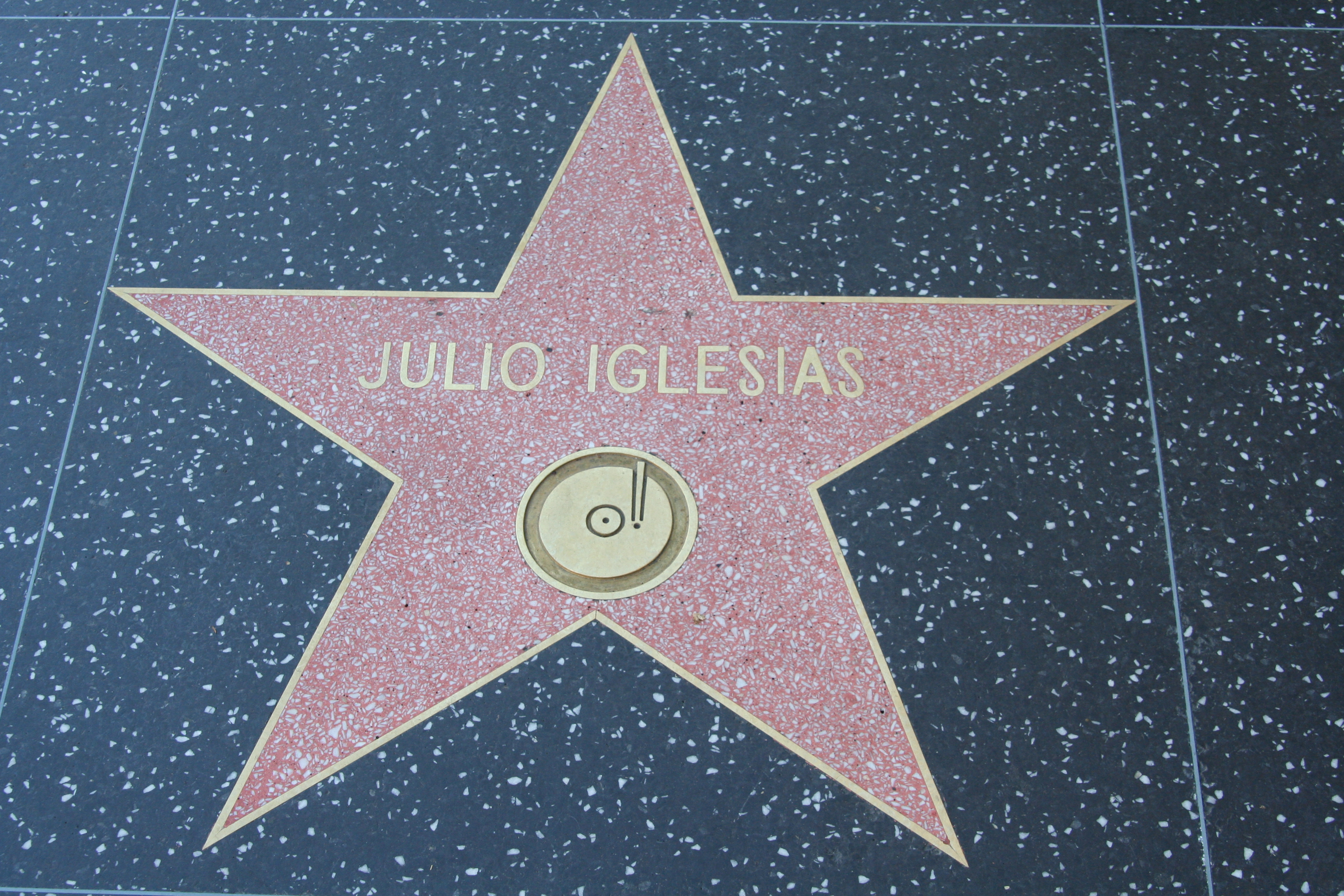
Julio Iglesias' star at Hollywood Walk of Fame

=== Honours ===
==== Spanish National Honours ====
- Gold Medal of Merit in the Fine Arts
- Gold Medal of the Community of Madrid

==== Foreign Honours ====
- France
  - Knight of the Legion of Honour
  - Medal of the City of Paris

== Discography ==
Selected albums

- 1969: Yo canto
- 1970: Gwendolyne
- 1972: Un canto a Galicia
- 1973: Soy
- 1974: A flor de piel
- 1975: A México
- 1975: El amor
- 1976: America
- 1977: A mis 33 años
- 1978: Aimer la vie
- 1978: Emociones
- 1978: Sono un pirata, sono un signore
- 1979: À vous les femmes
- 1980: Hey!
- 1981: De niña a mujer
- 1982: Et l'amour crea la femme
- 1982: Momentos
- 1982: Momenti
- 1983: Julio
- 1984: 1100 Bel Air Place
- 1985: Libra
- 1987: Un hombre solo
- 1987: Tutto l'amore che ti manca
- 1988: Non Stop
- 1989: Raíces
- 1990: Starry Night
- 1992: Calor
- 1994: Crazy
- 1995: La carretera
- 1996: Tango
- 2000: Noche de cuatro lunas
- 2001: Ao meu Brasil
- 2003: Divorcio
- 2006: Romantic Classics
- 2007: Quelque chose de France
- 2011: 1
- 2015: México
- 2017: México & Amigos

== Collaborations on Other Artists' Albums ==
- Without a Song by Willie Nelson (1983), song: "As Time Goes By"
- Voces unidas by various artists (1985), song: "Cantaré, cantarás"
- Suspiros de España by Manolo Escobar (1987), song: "Un canto a Galicia"
- What a Wonderful World by Willie Nelson (1988), song: "Spanish Eyes"
- Soñadores de España by Plácido Domingo (1989), song: "Soñadores de España"
- Homenaje by Lola Flores (1990), song: "Somos dos caminantes"
- Piel de hombre by José Luis Rodríguez "El Puma" (1992), song: "Torero"
- La distancia by Simone Bittencourt de Oliveira (1993), song: "Brigas"
- Duets by Frank Sinatra (1993), song: "Summer Wind"
- Mar adentro by Donato & Estéfano (1995), song: "Naturaleza"
- Voces unidas by various artists (1996), song: "Puedes llegar..."
- Amigos by Paul Anka (1996), song: "A mi manera (My Way)"
- Desde que tú te has ido by Cecilia (posthumous release, 1996), song: "Un ramito de violetas"
- Nana latina by Nana Mouskouri (1996), song: "Sé que volverás"
- ...Y Amigos by Raúl di Blasio (1998), song: "Uno"
- Y sigue siendo el rey by José Alfredo Jiménez (1999), song: "El rey"
- Zezé Di Camargo & Luciano by Zezé di Camargo & Luciano (2002), song: "Dois Amigos"
- Parenthèses by Françoise Hardy (2006), song: "Partir quand même"
- The Ultimate Collection by Nana Mouskouri (2007), song: "Return to Love"
- Una estrella en el cielo by Rocío Dúrcal (2010), song: "Cómo han pasado los años"
- Somos Jóvenes: 50 años de Dúo Dinámico (2011), song: "Soy un truhan, soy un señor"
- Rendez-Vous by Nana Mouskouri (2012), song: "Grande, grande, grande"
- Los Del Río Tropical by Los del Río (2017), song: "Soy un truhan, soy un señor"
- Golden by Romeo Santos (2017), song: "El Amigo"
- Dios Los Cría by Andrés Calamaro (2021), song: "Bohemio"
- América Mía by Alfredo Taucher (2022), song: "Las Mujeres Latinas"

== Videography ==
- Julio Iglesias en España (1989, 57 minutes), recorded in Spain (1988)
- Julio Iglesias en América (1990, 58 minutes)
- Julio Iglesias Tournée 88 (1989, 50 minutes)
- Starry Night (1991, 78 minutes)
- Julio Iglesias: Mis personajes favoritos (1992, 30 minutes)
- Julio Iglesias Rediscovered (2002, 50 minutes)
- Julio Iglesias in Jerusalem (2003, 50 minutes)

== See also ==
- Julio Iglesias meme – Internet meme featuring Julio Iglesias
- List of music artists by net worth
- List of best-selling Latin music artists
- List of best-selling music artists
- List of best-selling Latin albums

Preceded by Salomé with "Vivo cantando"	Spain in the Eurovision Song Contest; 1970	Succeeded by Karina with "En un mundo nuevo"
