= Momentos (Julio Iglesias album) =

Studio album by Julio Iglesias
- Released: October 1982
- Studio: Sonoland (Madrid); CBS Studios (London); Criteria Studios (Miami)
- Genre: Latin pop
- Length: 38:52
- Language: Spanish; Portuguese
- Label: Discos CBS; Columbia Records
- Producer: Ramón Arcusa

Julio Iglesias chronology
| Begin the Beguine (1981) | Momentos (1982) | Julio (1983) |

Momentos (Moments) is a 1982 album by Julio Iglesias. By 1984, the album sold over 1 million copies in Brazil. With sales of over 12 million, it is believed to be the best-selling Latin album of all-time.

== Track listing ==
All tracks produced by Ramón Arcusa.

Professional ratings
Review scores
| Source | Rating |
|---|---|
| AllMusic | 4.5/5 stars |

Momentos — Spanish edition
| No. | Title | Writer(s) | Length |
|---|---|---|---|
| 1. | "Nathalie" | Julio Iglesias; Ramón Arcusa | 3:57 |
| 2. | "Momentos" | Iglesias; Tony Renis; Arcusa | 3:33 |
| 3. | "La Paloma (Tradicional)" | Iglesias; Arcusa | 4:54 |
| 4. | "La Cosas Que Tiene La Vida" | Danny Daniel | 3:30 |
| 5. | "Amor" | Ricardo López; Gabriel Ruiz | 3:20 |
| 6. | "Quijote" | Iglesias; Manuel de la Calva; Arcusa; Gianni Belfiore | 4:01 |
| 7. | "No Me Vuelvo A Enamorar" | Iglesias; Fernán Martínez; Arcusa | 3:48 |
| 8. | "Con La Misma Piedra" | Massias (Ketepao) | 3:58 |
| 9. | "Esa Mujer" | Iglesias; Rafael Ferro; Martínez; Arcusa | 4:06 |
| 10. | "Si El Amor Llama A Tu Puerta" | Ray Girado | 3:36 |
| Total length: | | | 38:52 |

Momentos — Brazilian edition
| No. | Title | Writer(s) | Portuguese adaptation | Length |
|---|---|---|---|---|
| 1. | "Momentos" | Iglesias; Renis; Arcusa | Fernando Adour | 3:33 |
| 2. | "Quijote" | Iglesias; de la Calva; Arcusa; Belfiore | | 4:01 |
| 3. | "Abraça-me" | Iglesias; Ferro | Roberto Halbouti | 3:38 |
| 4. | "Paloma" | Iglesias; Arcusa | Adour | 4:56 |
| 5. | "Amor" | López; Ruiz | | 3:20 |
| 6. | "No Me Vuelvo A Enamorar" | Iglesias; Martínez; Arcusa | Adour | 3:48 |
| 7. | "Grande, Grande, Grande" | A. Testa; Iglesias; Renis | Gonzaga Jr. | 3:44 |
| 8. | "Con La Misma Piedra" | Massias (Ketepao) | | 3:45 |
| 9. | "Nathalie" | Iglesias; Arcusa | Adour | 3:55 |
| 10. | "Lembranças De Ypacarai" | Z. de Mirkin; D. Ortiz | Francisco Rodrigues | 4:09 |
| Total length: | | | | 38:49 |

== Personnel ==
Adapted from the Momentos liner notes:

=== Performance credits ===
- Pepe Sánchez – drums
- Carlos Villa – electric guitar, acoustic guitar
- Eduardo Leyva – keyboards
- Rafael Ferro – keyboards
- Eduardo Gracia – bass guitar
- Rafael Martínez – acoustic guitar
- Martyn Ford – strings
- Merche Macaria – chorus
- Ana Navarrete – chorus
- Mariví Navarrete – chorus

=== Technical credits ===
- Ramón Arcusa – producer, orchestral arrangements and direction
- Rafael Ferro – orchestral arrangements and direction (tracks 2, 5, 9)
- Fernando Adour – technical realization in Portuguese
- Juan Vinader – audio engineer
- Bob Castle – audio engineer
- Mike Ross – audio engineer
- Faustino G. Molina – musicians coordinator of Madrid
- Piatti & Wolk Design Associates, Inc. – graphic design
- Peter Cunningham – photography

== Charts ==
=== Weekly charts ===
Weekly chart performance for Momentos
| Chart (1982–93) | Peak position |
|---|---|
| Argentine Albums (CAPIF) | 2 |
| Austrian Albums (Ö3 Austria) | 12 |
| Danish Albums (Hitlisten) | 5 |
| Dutch Albums (Album Top 100) | 24 |
| German Albums (Offizielle Top 100) | 16 |
| Japanese Albums (Cassettes) (Oricon) | 1 |
| Japanese Albums (LPs) (Oricon) | 2 |
| Norwegian Albums (VG-lista) | 11 |
| Portuguese Albums (AFP) | 30 |
| Spanish Albums (AFYVE) | 1 |
| US Billboard 200 | 191 |
| US Top Latin Albums (Billboard) | 25 |
| US Latin Pop Albums (Billboard) | 11 |

=== Year-end charts ===
Year-end chart performance for Momentos
| Chart (1982) | Position |
|---|---|
| Spanish Albums (AFYVE) | 10 |

| Chart (1983) | Position |
|---|---|
| Brazilian Albums (Nopem) | 13 |
| Japanese Albums (Oricon) | 2 |
| Spanish Albums (AFYVE) | 20 |

=== Decade-end charts ===
Decade-end chart performance for Momentos
| Chart (1980–1989) | Position |
|---|---|
| Japanese Albums (Oricon) | 22 |

== Certifications ==
| Region | Certification | Certified units/sales |
|---|---|---|
| Argentina (CAPIF) | 7× Platinum | 420,000^{^} |
| Austria (IFPI Austria) | Gold | 25,000^{*} |
| Brazil (Pro-Música Brasil) | 8× Platinum | 2,000,000^{*} |
| Canada (Music Canada) | Gold | 50,000^{^} |
| Chile | Gold | |
| Colombia | Platinum | |
| Denmark (IFPI Danmark) | Platinum | 80,000^{^} |
| Finland (Musiikkituottajat) | Platinum | 60,436 |
| Japan (RIAJ) | 3× Platinum | 818,500 |
| Mexico (AMPROFON) | 2× Platinum | 500,000^{^} |
| Netherlands (NVPI) | Gold | 50,000^{^} |
| Portugal (AFP) | Gold | 20,000^{^} |
| Spain (Promusicae) | 6× Platinum | 600,000^{^} |
| South Korea (KMCA) | Gold | |
| Sweden (GLF) | Gold | 50,000^{^} |
| United States (RIAA) | 2× Platinum (Latin) | 200,000^{^} |
Summaries
| Worldwide | — | 12,000,000 |
^{*} Sales figures based on certification alone.^{^} Shipments figures based on certification alone.

== See also ==
- List of best-selling albums in Brazil
- List of best-selling albums of the 1980s (Japan)
- List of best-selling Latin albums
