= Johnny (John Farnham album) =

Studio album by Johnny Farnham
- Released: August 1971
- Recorded: January–May 1971
- Genre: Pop
- Label: His Master's Voice/EMI
- Producer: Howard Gable

Johnny Farnham chronology
Christmas Is... Johnny Farnham (1970)	Johnny (1971)	The Best of Johnny Farnham (1971)

Johnny is the fifth studio album by Australian pop singer John Farnham, (who was billed then as "Johnny" Farnham) which was released on His Master's Voice for EMI Records in August 1971. It peaked at No. 24 on the Australian Kent Music Report Albums Charts. Farnham had earlier No. 1 singles with "Sadie (The Cleaning Lady)" in 1968 and his cover of "Raindrops Keep Fallin' on My Head" in 1970; a non-album single, "Acapulco Sun" was released in May 1971 but there were no charting singles from Johnny. The album features compositions from artists as diverse as George Harrison, Elton John, Stevie Wonder, Joe South and George Gershwin and Ira Gershwin.

== Background ==
Johnny Farnham's first No. 1 single on the Go-Set National Singles Charts was the novelty song "Sadie (The Cleaning Lady)". Selling 180 000 copies in Australia, "Sadie (The Cleaning Lady)" was the highest selling single by an Australian artist of the decade. His second No. 1 was a cover of B. J. Thomas' "Raindrops Keep Fallin' on My Head", which peaked at No. 1 for seven weeks in January–March 1970. A non-album single, "Comic Conversation" was released in October 1970 and peaked at No. 10 on the Go-Set National Top 60 Singles Chart and was still charting in March 1971. His fifth album, Johnny was released in August 1971, which peaked at #24 on the Kent Music Report Albums Charts. Another non-album single, "Acapulco Sun" had been released in May and peaked at No. 21 on the Go-Set Top 60, but there were no charting singles from Johnny. Aside from Johnny, Farnham also released a compilation, The Best of Johnny Farnham, and a duet album with Allison Durbin, Together, all in 1971.

== Track listing ==
Side A

1. "For Once in My Life" (Ronald Miller, Orlando Murden) – 2:52
2. "Band of Gold" (Jack Taylor, Bob Musel) – 2:29
3. "Stick of Incense" – 3:07
4. "Knock Three Times" (Irwin Levine, L. Russell Brown) – 2:58
5. "Rag Mamma Rag" (Robbie Robertson) – 3:03
6. "Take Me to the Pilot" (Bernie Taupin, Elton John) – 3:36

Side B

1. "Your Song" (Bernie Taupin, Elton John) – 4:04
2. "Ma Cherie Amour" (Stevie Wonder, Henry Cosby, Sylvia Moy) – 2:47
3. "Something" (George Harrison) – 3:41
4. "Summertime" (George Gershwin, Ira Gershwin) – 4:15
5. "Rose Garden" (Joe South) – 3:04
6. "This Must Be The End" (Billy Green) – 3:33

== Chart positions ==
Year	Chart	Peak position
1971	Australia (Kent Music Report)	24
