= Mi Vida: Grandes Éxitos =

Greatest hits album by Julio Iglesias
- Released: 13 October 1998
- Recorded: 1969–1996
- Genre: Latin; pop; Latin pop
- Length: 147:32
- Language: Spanish; English
- Label: Columbia
- Producer: Rudy Pérez; Julio Iglesias; Roberto Livi; Albert Hammond; Tony Renis; Richard Perry

Julio Iglesias chronology
My Life: The Greatest Hits (1998)	Mi Vida: Grandes Éxitos (1998)	Minha Vida: Grandes Sucessos (1998)

Singles from Mi Vida: Grandes Éxitos
- 1. "La Gota Fría" Released: 16 November 1998

Professional ratings
Review scores
Source	Rating
AllMusic	No rating

Mi Vida: Grandes Éxitos is a double-CD greatest hits album by Spanish singer Julio Iglesias, released on 13 October 1998 through Columbia Records.

The album contained a special selection of 38 songs Julio Iglesias had recorded over four decades.

Four other versions of the album were issued simultaneously for the English, Portuguese, Italian, and French-speaking markets. These regional editions mostly included songs performed by Iglesias in the languages specific to those markets, although all versions included tracks in Spanish and English that overlapped with the track listing of the original Spanish album.

== Track listing ==
=== Disc 1 ===
No.	Title	Writer(s)	Length
1.	"La Gota Fría" (New song)	Emiliano Zuleta	3:33
2.	"Soy un Truhán, Soy un Señor" (From the album 33 Años)	Ramón Arcusa; Manuel de la Calva; Julio Iglesias	3:01
3.	"Me Olvidé de Vivir" (From the album Emociones)	Pierre Billon; Iglesias; Jacques Revaux	4:50
4.	"Quijote" (From the album Hey!)	Ramón Arcusa; de la Calva; Roger Eno; Iglesias	4:01
5.	"Momentos" (From the album Momentos)	Ramón Arcusa; Iglesias; Tony Renis	3:32
6.	"La Nave del Olvido" (From the album Hey!)	Dino Ramos	4:11
7.	"Que Nadie Sepa Mi Sufrir" (From the album De niña a mujer)	Angel Cabral; Cabral Dizeo	3:20
8.	"Nathalie" (From the album Moments)	Arcusa; Iglesias	3:53
9.	"De Niña a Mujer" (From the album De niña a mujer)	Arcusa; Iglesias; Tony Renis	3:14
10.	"Ni Te Tengo Ni Te Olvido" (From the album Libra)	Luis Gardey	4:00
11.	"Felicidades (featuring D. Pedro Vargas)" (From the album Libra)	Ray Girado	3:46
12.	"Que No Se Rompa La Noche" (From the album Un hombre solo)	Manuel Alejandro; Ana Magdalena	4:25
13.	"Lo Mejor De Tu Vida" (From the album Un hombre solo)	Manuel Alejandro; Marian Beigbeder	4:16
14.	"Milonga Medley: Milonga Sentimental/Vivo" (From the album Calor)	Arcusa; Homero Manzi; Sebastián Piana	4:02
15.	"Agua Dulce, Agua Salá" (From the album La carretera)	Hal Batt; Edgardo Donato; Estéfano	4:24
16.	"Vuela Alto" (From the album La carretera)	Beatriz Alvarez; Marian Beigbeder; Sandra Beigbeder	3:09
17.	"Baila Morena" (From the album La carretera)	Rafael Ferro; Roberto Livi	3:49
18.	"La Cumparsita" (From the album Tango)	Pascual Contursi; Enrique Pedro Maroni; Gerardo Matos Rodriguez	2:34
19.	"Bamboleo" (From the album Raíces)	Tonino Baliardo; Jahloul "Chico" Bouchikhi; S. Diaz; Nicolás Reyes	4:39

=== Disc 2 ===
No.	Title	Writer(s)	Length
1.	"Un Canto a Galicia" (New recording of the song in the album Por Una Mujer)	Iglesias	4:30
2.	"Hey" (From the album Hey!)	Arcusa; Mario Balducci; Giovanni Belfiore; Iglesias	4:58
3.	"La Vida Sigue Igual" (New recording of the song in the album Yo canto)	Iglesias	2:16
4.	"Abrázame" (New recording of the song in the album El amor)	Rafael Ferro; Iglesias	3:16
5.	"To All the Girls I've Loved Before (featuring Willie Nelson)" (From the album 1100 Bel Air Place)	Hal David; Albert Hammond	3:32
6.	"33 Años" (New recording of the song in the album A Mis 33 Años)	Iglesias	3:33
7.	"Manuela" (New recording of the song in the album A Flor De Piel)	Manuel Alejandro; Ana Magdalena	3:37
8.	"All of You (featuring Diana Ross)" (From the album "1100 Bel Air Place")	Cole Porter; Renis; Cynthia Weil	3:58
9.	"Ae, Ao" (From the album "Non-Stop")	Renis	3:17
10.	"Caruso" (From the album Crazy)	Lucio Dalla	5:49
11.	"A Media Luz" (From the album "Tango")	Edgardo Donato; Carlos Cesar Lenzi	2:41
12.	"La Carretera" (From the album La Carretera)	Ferro; Roberto Livi	5:04
13.	"Can't Help Falling in Love" (From the album Starry Night)	Luigi Creatore; Hugo Peretti; George David Weiss	3:19
14.	"Crazy" (From the album Crazy)	Willie Nelson	3:15
15.	"When You Tell Me That You Love Me (featuring Dolly Parton)" (From the album Crazy)	John Bettis; Albert Hammond	3:59
16.	"Por el Amor de Una Mujer" (New recording of the song in the album A Flor De Piel)	Danny Daniel; Sonny Marti	3:51
17.	"Smoke Gets in Your Eyes" (feat: All-4-One)	Otto Harbach; Jerome Kern	3:35
18.	"My Way [A Mi Manera]" (feat: Paul Anka)	Paul Anka; Claude François; Jacques Revaux; Gilles Thibault	4:24
19.	"Me Va, Me Va" (From the album 1100 Bel Air Place)	Ricardo Ceratto; Albert Hammond	5:59

== Charts ==
Chart (1998–1999)	Peak position
Spain (PROMUSICAE)	1
US (Billboard Latin Pop Albums)	11
US (Billboard Top Latin Albums)	21

== Certifications and sales ==
Region	Certification	Certified units/sales
Argentina (CAPIF)	2× Platinum	120,000^{^}
Central America (CFC)	Gold	
Chile	Gold	
Colombia	Gold	
Spain (PROMUSICAE)	5× Platinum	~ 600,000
Peru	Gold	
Uruguay (CUD)	Gold	3,000^{^}
^{^} Shipments figures based on certification alone.

== See also ==
- List of number-one albums of 1998 (Spain)
