= Edgardo Donato =

Argentinian composer and orchestra leader (1897–1963)

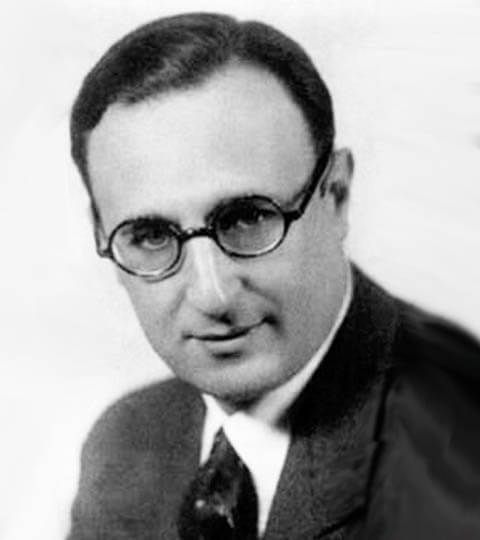
- Edgardo Donato

Background information
- Born: Edgardo Felipe Valerio Donato; April 14, 1897; Buenos Aires, Argentina
- Origin: Argentina
- Died: February 15, 1963 (aged 65) Buenos Aires, Argentina
- Genre: Tango
- Occupations: Violinist, orchestra conductor, composer
- Instrument: Violin
- Years active: 1915–1963

Edgardo Donato (Spanish pronunciation: [eðˈɣaɾðo ðoˈnato]; April 14, 1897 – February 15, 1963) was an Argentine tango composer and conductor. He composed the song "A Media Luz".

== Life ==
Born in Buenos Aires, Argentina, he was raised in Montevideo, Uruguay, where he was musically trained. Donato composed the 1924 tango "A media luz". It became a standard, which later had English lyrics and a verse melody written by Bob Musel. The latter adaptation was titled "Tell Me Marianne", and spent a week at number 1 on the British sheet music charts in June 1947.

Donato died aged 65 in 1963.

== Works ==
- A las dos de la mañana (lyrics by Gerónimo Martinelli Massa)
- A media luz (lyrics by Carlos César Lenzi)
- Abombada (lyrics by Máximo Orsi)
- Adónde vas, tan regalón (with Osvaldo Donato, lyrics by Nolo López (alias of Manuel López))
- Alas rotas (lyrics by Maruja Pacheco Huergo)
- Amores viejos (lyrics by Mario Battistella)
- Así es el tango (lyrics by Homero Manzi)
- Beba (lyrics by Celedonio Flores)
- Berretín (lyrics by Máximo Orsi)
- Bigotito (lyrics by Celedonio Flores)
- Cara negra (lyrics by José Rótulo)
- Cartón ligador (lyrics by Roberto Fontaina and Víctor Soliño)
- Catalina (with Carlos Warren)
- Che, no hay derecho (lyrics by José de Prisco)
- Chiquilinadas (lyrics by Nolo López (alias of Manuel López)l)
- Cómo me gusta (lyrics by Luis Mario (alias of María Luisa Carnelli))
- Compadrito (with Osvaldo Donato, lyrics by Luis Díaz)
- Congoja (lyrics by Luis Rubistein)
- Corazoncito de oro (lyrics by Celedonio Flores)
- Cosita linda (lyrics by Alberto Aguirre)
- Cuando se escriba tu historia (lyrics by Máximo Orsi)
- Dejala que siga (lyrics by Ray Rada)
- Derrota
- Desensillá hasta que aclare (lyrics by Manuel Romero)
- Don José (with Roberto Zerrillo, lyrics by Francisco Antonio Bastardi)
- El acomodo
- El disloque (lyrics by Nolo López (alias of Manuel López))
- El hijo de Julián (lyrics by Carlos Zamalvide)
- El huracán (with Osvaldo Donato, lyrics by Nolo López (alias of Manuel López))
- El lecherito (lyrics by Horacio Sanguinetti)
- El lengue
- El ratón Mickey
- En aquel cuartito (with Juan Baüer, lyrics by Máximo Orsi)
- En el beso de la luna (lyrics by Máximo Orsi)
- Ensalada mixta (lyrics by Máximo Orsi)
- Esquinita (lyrics by Edmundo Bianchi)
- Felicitame hermano (with Osvaldo Donato, lyrics by Héctor Gagliardi)
- Gato (lyrics by Homero Manzi)
- Hacete cartel (lyrics by Antonio Botta)
- Has llegado (lyrics by Marvil (alias of Elisardo Martínez Vilas)
- Hasta luego (lyrics by Carlos Álvarez Pintos)
- Hay que acomodarse (lyrics by Antonio Botta)
- Julián (lyrics by José Panizza)
- La caída de la estantería (lyrics by Luis Rubistein)
- La de los ojos tristes (lyrics by Héctor Marcó)
- La gran aldea (lyrics by Horacio Sanguinetti)
- La llorona (lyrics bye Julio Romero (alias of Manuel Romero))
- La milonga que faltaba (lyrics by Carlos Pesce)
- La misma calle (lyrics by Francisco García Jiménez)
- La quebrada
- Lágrimas (lyrics by Maruja Pacheco Huergo)
- Madreselva (with Osvaldo Donato)
- Malala (lyrics by Víctor Soliño)
- ¡Mamá! (lyrics by Celedonio Flores)
- Mañana (lyrics by Ivo Pelay)
- Mañanita (lyrics by Alfredo Bigeschi)
- Marcelo (with Carlos Warren, lyrics by Miguel Héctor Escuder)
- María (lyrics by Carlos Pesce)
- Mi porteñita grácil (lyrics by Juan Bautista Abad Reyes)
- Mi serenata (lyrics by Juan Carlos Thorry)
- Mi Virgencita de Luján (lyrics by Horacio Basterra)
- ¡Miau!... (lyrics by Luis Rubistein)
- Mis pesares (lyrics by Carlos Pesce)
- Muchacho (lyrics by Celedonio Flores)
- Muñequita de trapo (lyrics by Lucy Clory)
- Murió el malevo
- Ni te perdono ni te olvido (lyrics by Antonio Miguel Podestá)
- No aguanto más
- No es manca la paisana (lyrics by Francisco Brancatti)
- No es pa' tanto (lyrics by Máximo Vago (alias of Clemente Alberto Moreno)
- No te cases (lyrics by Carlos Pesce)
- ¡Oiga!.. (lyrics by Francisco Antonio Bastardi)
- ¡Para qué..! (lyrics by Maruja Pacheco Huergo)
- Para ser copero (with Osvaldo Donato, lyrics by Raúl Estades)
- Parece ayer (lyrics by José María Contursi)
- Pasos (lyrics by Enrique Cadícamo)
- Penas (lyrics by Máximo Orsi)
- Pensalo bien... (lyrics by Carlos Álvarez Pintos)
- Petronila y Candelario (lyrics by Máximo Orsi)
- Picaflor (lyrics by Máximo Orsi)
- Pobre soñador (lyrics by Julio Romero (alias of Manuel Romero))
- ¡Por eso grito! (lyrics by César Córdoba (alias of César José Fábregas))
- Por 'H' o por 'B' (lyrics by Enrique Dizeo)
- Por mi viejita (with Roberto Zerrillo, lyrics by Víctor Soliño)
- Porque sos así (lyrics by Alfredo Bigeschi)
- Porteña linda (lyrics by Horacio Sanguinetti)
- Protestona (lyrics by Máximo Orsi)
- Pura chispa (lyrics by Iván Diez)
- Puras plumas (lyrics by Víctor Soliño)
- Repique del corazón (lyrics by José Rótulo)
- Riachuelo (lyrics by Máximo Orsi)
- Risas (lyrics by Máximo Orsi)
- Rosalinda (lyrics by Máximo Orsi)
- Se va la lancha (with Héctor María Artola, lyrics by Francisco Antonio Bastardi)
- Se va la vida (with Roberto Zerrillo, lyrics by Luis Mario (alias of María Luisa Carnelli))
- Siga el baile (with con Carlos Warren)
- Siga el tango (with Carlos Warren, lyrics by Francisco Antonio Bastardi)
- Soñadora
- ¿Sos vos? ¡Qué cambiada estás! (lyrics by Celedonio Flores)
- Te busco (lyrics by Héctor Marcó)
- Te gané de mano (lyrics by Juan Bautista Abad Reyes)
- Toda mía (lyrics by Carlos Álvarez Pintos)
- Triqui-tra (lyrics by Maruja Pacheco Huergo)
- Triste y sin alpiste (lyrics by Hugo Zamora)
- Tu desprecio (lyrics by Homero Manzi)
- Un libro (lyrics by Carlos Pesce)
- Un poco tarde (lyrics by Reynaldo Yiso)
- Venite conmigo (A ella...) (lyrics by Celedonio Flores)
- Vivo sin sombra, lejos de ti (lyrics by Carlos Pesce)
- Volvé!... (lyrics by Luis Bayón Herrera)
- Volvé a casa (lyrics by Francisco Antonio Bastardi)
- Y llegó el amor (yrics by Máximo Orsi)
- Ya se ha marcao la hacienda (lyrics by Luis Díaz)
- Yo te amo (lyrics by Carlos César Lenzi)
