= En français... =

Studio album by Julio Iglesias
- Released: 2004
- Length: 66:01
- Language: French, etc.
- Label: Columbia (Sony)

Julio Iglesias chronology
Divorcio (2003)	En français... (2004)	L'Homme que je suis (2005)

Singles from En français...
- 1. "Aimer la vie" Released: 1978; 2. "Le monde est fou, le monde est beau" Released: 1978

Professional ratings
Review scores
Source	Rating
AllMusic	3/5 stars

En français... is a French-language studio album by Julio Iglesias, released in 2004 on Columbia (Sony).

== Track listing ==
No.	Title	Writer(s)	Length
1.	"Vous les femmes"	Ramón Arcusa / Manuel de la Calva / Julio Iglesias	2:59
2.	"Ce qui me manque"	Didier Barbelivien	3:28
3.	"Il faut toujours un perdant"	Ramón Arcusa / Mario Balducci / Giovanni Belfiore / Julio Iglesias	4:57
4.	"Hommage à la chanson française: Ne me quitte pas / Que c'est triste Venise / ..."	Charles Aznavour / Jacques Brel / Gilbert Bécaud / Pierre Delanoë / Françoise Dorin / Marcel Louiguy / Édith Piaf	5:24
5.	"Je n'ai pas changé"		3:30
6.	"Manuela"	Manuel Alejandro / Ana Magdalena	3:39
7.	"Viens m'embrasser"	Rafael Ferro / Julio Iglesias	3:15
8.	"Cœurs de Papier"	R. Ferro / Julio Iglesias / Roberto Livi	4:01
9.	"Où est passée ma bohême"	Michel Jourdan / Gonzalo Roig	3:54
10.	"Un chant à Galicia"	Julio Iglesias / Etienne Roda-Gil	4:31
11.	"Vers la frontière (La carretera)"	R. Ferro / Roberto Livi	4:11
12.	"Nostalgie (Nathalie)"	Ramón Arcusa / Julio Iglesias / Claude Lemesle	3:56
13.	"La vie défile en silence"	Rafael Ferro / Roberto Livi	3:43
14.	"C'est ma faute"	Jaime Espinoza	3:56
15.	"Mira"	Julio Iglesias / Rene Toledo	4:14
16.	"Moralito"	Ramón Arcusa / Emiliano Zuleta	3:34
17.	"Quizas, quizas, quizas" (feat: Arielle Dombasle)	Osvaldo Farrés	2:49
Total length:			66:01

== Charts ==
Chart (2004–2005)	Peak position
Belgian Albums (Ultratop Wallonia)	26
Chart (2016)	Peak position
French Albums (SNEP)	187
