= L'Homme que je suis =

Studio album by Julio Iglesias
- Released: 2005
- Length: 44:04
- Language: French
- Label: Columbia (Sony BMG)

Julio Iglesias chronology
En français... (2004)	L'Homme que je suis (2005)	Romantic Classics (2006)

Singles from L'Homme que je suis
- 1. "L'Homme que je suis" Released: 2005

L'Homme que je suis is a French-language studio album by Julio Iglesias, released in 2005 on Columbia Records (Sony BMG).

== Track listing ==
No.	Title	Length
1.	"L'Homme que je suis"	3:49
2.	"Le Prix d'un baiser"	3:28
3.	"Attendre"	3:42
4.	"C'est votre histoire et la mienne"	3:40
5.	"Je n'ai pas osé"	3:25
6.	"Un homme fragile"	3:23
7.	"Le Roi soleil a froid"	3:36
8.	"Elle ne me voit même pas"	4:28
9.	"Encore envie"	3:02
10.	"Tout de toi"	3:35
11.	"Ce qui me manque"	3:28
12.	"Medley (Hommage à la chanson française): Ne me quitte pas / Que c'est triste Venise / Et maintenant / La Vie en rose" (bonus track)	5:23
Total length:		44:04

== Charts ==
Chart (2005)	Peak position
Belgian Albums (Ultratop Wallonia)	5
French Albums (SNEP)	3
Spanish Albums (PROMUSICAE)	24
Swiss Albums (Schweizer Hitparade)	87

== Certifications ==
Region	Certification	Certified units/sales
France (SNEP)	Gold	100,000^{*}
^{*} Sales figures based on certification alone.
