= The USA by Day and the RAF by Night =

Song
- Published: 1944
- Songwriter(s): Hal Block & Bob Musel
- Producer(s): Paramount Music Corp.

"The USA by Day and the RAF by Night" is a World War II era song written and composed by Hal Block and Bob Musel. The song was published by Paramount Music Corp. in 1944. According to the book The Songs That Fought the War by John Bush Jones, the song

"applauds the heavy air strikes on Germany by Britain's Royal Air Force and the Army Air Force of the United States, specifically the strikes on the Ruhr that began on March 5, 1943, and the saturation bombing of Hamburg that started on July 24."
