= Tango (Julio Iglesias album) =

Studio album by Julio Iglesias
- Released: 19 November 1996
- Genre: Pop Latino; tango
- Length: 33:55
- Label: Columbia

Julio Iglesias chronology
| La carretera (1995) | Tango (1996) | My Life: The Greatest Hits (1998) |

Professional ratings
Review scores
| Source | Rating |
|---|---|
| Allmusic | 4/5 stars |

Tango is a studio album released by Spanish singer Julio Iglesias on 19 November 1996. This album became his first number-one set on the Billboard Top Latin Albums and the recipient of a nomination for a Grammy Award for Best Latin Pop Album.

Julio went on to win an American Music Award for Tango in the summer of 1998 when he was up against Luis Miguel and son Enrique Iglesias.

== Track listing ==
The information from Billboard.

| No. | Title | Writer(s) | Length |
|---|---|---|---|
| 1. | "La Cumparsita" | Enrique Pedro Maroni, Gerardo Matos Rodríguez, Pascual Contursi | 2:33 |
| 2. | "El Día Que Me Quieras" | Carlos Gardel, Alfredo Le Pera | 3:00 |
| 3. | "A Media Luz" | Carlos Cesar Lenzi, Edgardo Donato | 2:41 |
| 4. | "Volver" | Carlos Gardel, Alfredo Le Pera | 3:33 |
| 5. | "Yira, Yira" | Enrique Santos Discépolo | 2:42 |
| 6. | "Mano a Mano" | Carlos Gardel, Esteban Celedonio Flores, José Razzano | 2:48 |
| 7. | "El Choclo" | Carlos Catan, Santos, Angel Villoldo | 2:47 |
| 8. | "Adiós, Pampa Mía!" | Mariano Mores, Francisco Canaro, Ivo Pelay | 3:06 |
| 9. | "Cambalache" | Enrique Santos Discépolo | 2:49 |
| 10. | "¡Uno...!" | Mariano Mores, Enrique Santos Discépolo | 2:51 |
| 11. | "Caminito" | Juan de Dios Filiberto, Gabino Coria Peñaloza | 2:26 |
| 12. | "Mi Buenos Aires Querido" | Carlos Gardel, Alfredo Le Pera | 2:39 |

== Charts ==
=== Weekly charts ===
Weekly chart performance for Tango
| Chart (1996–1997) | Peak position |
|---|---|
| Australian Albums (ARIA) | 16 |
| Austrian Albums (Ö3 Austria) | 49 |
| Belgian Albums (Ultratop Flanders) | 10 |
| Belgian Albums (Ultratop Wallonia) | 14 |
| Dutch Albums (Album Top 100) | 16 |
| European Albums (Music & Media) | 9 |
| French Albums (SNEP) | 5 |
| German Albums (Offizielle Top 100) | 35 |
| Greek Albums (IFPI) | 1 |
| Hungarian Albums (MAHASZ) | 38 |
| Italian Albums (FIMI) | 6 |
| Norwegian Albums (VG-lista) | 37 |
| New Zealand Albums (RMNZ) | 21 |
| Portuguese Albums (AFP) | 2 |
| Spanish Albums (AFYVE) | 1 |
| Swedish Albums (Sverigetopplistan) | 13 |
| Swiss Albums (Schweizer Hitparade) | 28 |
| US Billboard 200 | 84 |
| US Top Latin Albums (Billboard) | 1 |
| US Latin Pop Albums (Billboard) | 1 |

=== Year-end charts ===
Year-end chart performance for Tango
| Chart (1996) | Position |
|---|---|
| Spanish Albums (AFYVE) | 2 |

| Chart (1997) | Position |
|---|---|
| Australian Albums (ARIA) | 98 |
| Belgian Albums (Ultratop Wallonia) | 88 |
| Dutch Albums (Album Top 100) | 45 |
| European Albums (Music & Media) | 33 |
| French Albums (SNEP) | 32 |
| Spanish Albums (AFYVE) | 11 |
| US Top Latin Albums (Billboard) | 1 |
| US Latin Pop Albums (Billboard) | 1 |

== Sales and certifications ==
| Region | Certification | Certified units/sales |
|---|---|---|
| Argentina (CAPIF) | 4× Platinum | 240,000^{^} |
| Australia (ARIA) | Platinum | 70,000^{^} |
| Belgium (BRMA) | Gold | 25,000^{*} |
| Brazil (Pro-Música Brasil) | Platinum | 250,000^{*} |
| Canada (Music Canada) | Gold | 50,000^{^} |
| Central America (CFC) | Platinum | |
| Chile | 5× Platinum | |
| Colombia | Platinum | |
| France (SNEP) | Platinum | 300,000^{*} |
| Italy (FIMI) | Platinum | 170,000 |
| Mexico (AMPROFON) | Gold | 100,000^{^} |
| Netherlands (NVPI) | Platinum | 100,000^{^} |
| Philippines (PARI) | Gold | |
| Portugal (AFP) | Platinum | 40,000^{^} |
| Spain (PROMUSICAE) | 6× Platinum | 650,000 |
| South Korea (KMCA) | Gold | |
| Sweden (GLF) | Gold | 40,000^{^} |
| Switzerland (IFPI Switzerland) | Gold | 25,000^{^} |
| Taiwan (RIT) | Gold | |
| Thailand | Platinum | |
| United Kingdom (BPI) | Silver | 60,000^{^} |
| United States (RIAA) | 6× Platinum (Latin) | 600,000^{^} |
| Venezuela | 2× Platinum | |
Summaries
| Europe (IFPI) | Platinum | 1,000,000^{*} |
| Worldwide | — | 4,000,000 |
^{*} Sales figures based on certification alone.^{^} Shipments figures based on certification alone.

== See also ==
- List of number-one Billboard Top Latin Albums from the 1990s
- List of number-one Billboard Latin Pop Albums from the 1990s
- List of best-selling Latin albums
