= La Carretera =

Studio album by Julio Iglesias
- Released: June 27, 1995
- Studio: Criteria (Miami)
- Genre: Pop Latino
- Length: 38:20
- Label: Columbia

Julio Iglesias chronology
Crazy (1994)	La Carretera (1995)	Tango (1996)

La Carretera (The Road) is a studio album by Julio Iglesias. It was released on June 27, 1995. It was nominated for Pop Album of the Year at the Lo Nuestro Awards of 1996. Portuguese edition named "A Estrada", and France edition named "Vers la frontiere", and Italian edition named "Su questa strada".

== Track listing ==
1. "La Carretera" (Roberto Livi, Rafael Ferro)
2. "Cosas De La Vida" (Livi, Ferro)
3. "Baila Morena" (Livi, Ferro)
4. "Derroche" (Manuel Jimenez)
5. "El Ultimo Verano" (Iglesias, Livi, Ferro)
6. "Agua Dulce, Agua Salá" (Donato, Estefano, Hal Batt)
7. "Sin Excusas Ni Rodeos" (Iglesias, Donato, Estefano)
8. "Mal De Amores" (Livi, Ferro)
9. "Rumbas [Medley]" (M. Monreal, G. Monreal, García de Val, P. de Lucía, Torregrosa, J.M. Cano, Murillo, Gutiérrez, Fandino, Arcusa, Iglesias)
10. "Vuela Alto" (Sandra Beigbeder, Marian Beigbeder, Beatriz Álvarez)

== Charts ==
=== Weekly charts ===
Chart (1995)	Peak position
Austrian Albums (Ö3 Austria)	38
Belgian Albums (Ultratop Flanders)	11
Belgian Albums (Ultratop Wallonia)	19
Dutch Albums (Album Top 100)	8
European Albums (Music & Media)	15
French Albums Chart (SNEP)	13
Hungarian Albums (MAHASZ)	31
Norwegian Albums (VG-lista)	33
Portuguese Albums (AFP)	7
Spanish Albums (AFYVE)	1
Swedish Albums (Sverigetopplistan)	32
UK Albums (OCC)	6
US Top Latin Albums (Billboard)	3
US Latin Pop Albums (Billboard)	2

=== Year-end charts ===
Chart (1995)	Position
Belgian Albums (Ultratop Flanders)	63
Dutch Albums (Album Top 100)	55
European Top 100 Albums (Music & Media)	78
French Albums Chart (SNEP)	58
Spanish Albums (AFYVE)	2
US Top Latin Albums (Billboard)	14
US Latin Pop Albums (Billboard)	5

Chart (1996)	Position
Spanish Albums (AFYVE)	50
US Top Latin Albums (Billboard)	11
US Latin Pop Albums (Billboard)	11

== Sales and certifications ==
Region	Certification	Certified units/sales
Argentina (CAPIF)	6× Platinum	360,000^{^}
Brazil (Pro-Música Brasil)	2× Gold	200,000^{*}
Central America (CFC)	Gold	
Chile	2× Platinum	80,000
Colombia	Gold	
France (SNEP)	Gold	100,000^{*}
Indonesia	Gold	
Mexico (AMPROFON)	Gold	100,000^{^}
Netherlands (NVPI)	Gold	50,000^{^}
Portugal (AFP)	Gold	20,000^{^}
Singapore (RIAS)	Gold	
Spain (Promusicae)	6× Platinum	600,000^{^}
Thailand	Gold	
Taiwan (RIT)	Gold	
Venezuela	Gold	
Summaries
Europe (IFPI)	Platinum	1,000,000^{*}
^{*} Sales figures based on certification alone.^{^} Shipments figures based on certification alone.
