= Ao Meu Brasil =

Studio album by Julio Iglesias
- Released: December 18, 2001
- Label: Sony

Julio Iglesias chronology
Noche de cuatro lunas (2000)	Ao Meu Brasil (2001)	Divorcio (2003)

Ao Meu Brasil (To My Brazil) is an album by Julio Iglesias released on December 18, 2001 by Sony International. Iglesias sings all the songs in Portuguese.

== Track listing ==
1. "Dizem Que Os Homens Não Devem Chorar" (Los Hombres No Deben Llorar)
2. "Mal Acostumada"
3. "História de Amor"
4. "Se Um Dia Fores Minha" (El Día Que Me Quieras)
5. "Estrada" (La Carretera)
6. "Jogue Para Mim a Culpa" (Echame a Mí la Culpa)
7. "Viver a Vida "(Gozar la Vida) — duet with Daniel
8. "Dois Amigos" — duet with Zezé Di Camargo & Luciano
9. "Água Doce, Água Do Mar" (Agua Dulce, Agua Salá)
10. "Vida"
11. "Voa Amigo, Voa Alto" (Vuela Amigo, Vuela Alto)
12. "Pelo Amor de Uma Mulher" (Por el Amor de Una Mujer)
13. "Canção Do Mar" (Canción del Mar)

== Sales and certifications ==
Region	Certification	Certified units/sales
Brazil (Pro-Música Brasil)	Platinum	125,000^{*}
^{*} Sales figures based on certification alone.
