= The Best of Johnny Farnham =

The Best Of Johnny Farnham

Greatest hits album by Johnny Farnham
- Released: 1971
- Recorded: 1967–1971
- Genre: Pop
- Label: WRC
- Producer: David Mackay

Johnny Farnham chronology
Johnny (1971)	The Best Of Johnny Farnham (1971)	Together (1971)

The Best Of Johnny Farnham is the first compilation album by Australian singer Johnny Farnham, it was released on World Record Club in 1971. "Sadie (The Cleaning Lady)" was first released in November 1967 and peaked at No. 1 on the Go-Set National Singles Charts for five weeks early in 1968. His cover of the B. J. Thomas hit "Raindrops Keep Fallin' on My Head" had been released in November 1969 and peaked at No. 1 for seven weeks in January–March 1970. The album cover was available in a variety of colours including orange, red and blue.

== Background ==
Johnny Farnham's debut solo single was a novelty song, "Sadie (The Cleaning Lady)", it was released in November 1967 and peaked at No. 1 on the Go-Set National Singles Charts for five weeks early in 1968. Selling 180,000 copies in Australia, "Sadie (The Cleaning Lady)" was the highest selling single by an Australian artist of the decade. His second single, "Friday Kind Of Monday" was released in March 1968 as a double-A side with "Underneath The Arches" (not on this compilation) which peaked at No. 6. Both singles appeared on his debut album, Sadie in April.

His next single, released in July, was the double A-sided, "Jamie"/"I Don't Want To Love You", which peaked at No. 8 on the Go-Set National Singles Charts. This was followed by "Rose Coloured Glasses" in October which reached No. 16. Farnham's second album, Everybody Oughta Sing a Song followed in November.

Farnham's covers of Harry Nilsson's "One", and B. J. Thomas' "Raindrops Keep Fallin' on My Head" were released as singles, from his third album, Looking Through a Tear. "One"/"Mr. Whippy" (non-album track) was released as a double A-side in July 1969 and peaked at No. 4. "Raindrops Keep Fallin' On My Head" was released in November and peaked at No. 1 for seven weeks in January–March 1970.

== Track listing ==
Side A

1. "I've Been Rained On" (D. Frazier) – 2:22
2. "Everybody Oughta Sing A Song"(D. Frazier) – 2:18
3. "Jamie" (H. Poulsen) – 2:28
4. "I Don't Want to Love You" (D. Everly, P. Everly) – 2:48
5. "Painting a Shadow"(R. Bainbridge, B. Pritchard) – 2:10
6. "Sadie (The Cleaning Lady)" (R. Gilmore, J. Madara, D. White) – 3:17

Side B

1. "Raindrops Keep Fallin' on My Head" (H. David, B. Bacharach) – 2:29
2. "One" (H. Nilsson) – 2:49
3. "Two" (J. Farnham) – 2:29
4. "Friday Kind of Monday" (J. Barry, E. Greenwich) – 2:44
5. "The Last Thing on My Mind" (T. Paxton) – 3:27
6. "Rose Coloured Glasses" (H. Poulsen) – 2:49
