= Ray of Light =

1998 studio album by Madonna

Studio album by Madonna
- Released: February 22, 1998
- Recorded: June–November 1997
- Studios: Larrabee North (North Hollywood); The Hit Factory (New York City)
- Genres: Electronica; trip hop; techno-pop; new-age
- Length: 66:42
- Labels: Maverick; Warner Bros.
- Producers: Madonna; William Orbit; Patrick Leonard; Marius de Vries

Madonna chronology
Evita (1996)	Ray of Light (1998)	Music (2000)

Singles from Ray of Light
- 1. "Frozen" Released: January 23, 1998; 2. "Ray of Light" Released: April 27, 1998; 3. "Drowned World/Substitute for Love" Released: August 24, 1998; 4. "The Power of Good-Bye" Released: September 1, 1998; 5. "Little Star" Released: November 23, 1998; 6. "Nothing Really Matters" Released: February 9, 1999

Ray of Light is the seventh studio album by American singer and songwriter Madonna. It was released on February 22, 1998, by Maverick Records. A major stylistic and aesthetic departure from her previous works, Ray of Light reflected Madonna's embrace of Kabbalah, study of Hinduism and Buddhism, and daily practice of Ashtanga yoga.

Madonna began developing Ray of Light with producers Babyface and Patrick Leonard following the birth of her first child, Lourdes Leon. After those sessions failed to produce the direction she wanted, Madonna adopted a new musical approach with English producer William Orbit. Its recording process was the longest of Madonna's career and was frequently delayed by problems with Orbit's hardware setup, which repeatedly broke down and required repairs. Ray of Light's electronica, trip hop, techno-pop, and new-age production features instrumentation such as dense analog synthesizers and electric guitars. Its introspective themes include fame, spirituality, motherhood, and enlightenment.

Six singles supported the album, with "Frozen" topping the charts of nine countries worldwide, "Ray of Light" becoming Madonna's highest-debuting song on the US Billboard Hot 100, and "The Power of Good-Bye" achieving top-ten chart success throughout Europe. Ray of Light topped the charts in 17 countries and received multi-platinum certifications across the Americas, Europe, and the Asia–Pacific region. Debuting at number two on the US Billboard 200, it yielded the highest first-week sales for a woman at the time. It was further promoted with the Drowned World Tour, her first tour in eight years and the highest-grossing solo tour of 2001. Ray of Light has sold over 16 million copies worldwide.

On release, Ray of Light received universal acclaim from music critics, who praised Madonna's musical reinvention, introspective songwriting, and mature vocal performances, as well as Orbit's innovative and cohesive production. The album won four of its six nominations at the 41st Annual Grammy Awards, including Best Pop Album. Retrospectively, the album has been recognized for popularizing electronica in popular music and reaffirming Madonna's relevance at 39 years old, at a time when the industry was largely dominated by major teen-focused artists. Regarded as a pop music classic, Ray of Light is often called Madonna's magnum opus and is considered one of the greatest albums of all time.

== Background ==
Madonna released her sixth studio album, Bedtime Stories, in late 1994. The album adopted a softer musical style and image in an effort to regain public favor following the overwhelmingly negative reactions to the sexually explicit Erotica (1992)—her fifth studio album. Bedtime Stories debuted at number three on the Billboard 200 and produced two top-three US singles: "Secret" and "Take a Bow". The latter spent seven weeks atop the Billboard Hot 100, becoming her longest-running number-one hit. A year after releasing Bedtime Stories, Madonna issued Something to Remember, a compilation album of ballads that sold ten million copies worldwide.

After being cast as Argentine political leader Eva Perón in the musical film Evita in 1996, Madonna began undertaking vocal training and studied Argentina's history and Perón's life. That same year, she gave birth to her first child, a daughter named Lourdes Leon. In 1997, Madonna began developing an interest in Eastern mysticism, Hinduism, and Kabbalah, introduced to her by close friend and actress Sandra Bernhard. Madonna stated that it "was a big catalyst for [her]" and that it "took [her] on a search for answers to questions [she'd] never asked herself before".

== Writing and recording ==
Madonna began recording Ray of Light in June 1997 with producer Babyface, with whom she had previously collaborated on Bedtime Stories. After writing several songs together, she concluded that the material was not aligned with the musical direction she envisioned for the album. According to Babyface, the songs were similar in style to the pop ballad "Take a Bow", and Madonna "didn't want, or need, to repeat herself". After abandoning the songs she had written with Babyface, Madonna collaborated with musician Rick Nowels, who had previously co-written songs for Stevie Nicks and Celine Dion. According to Nowels, early in the process, Madonna appeared to aim for a more commercially-oriented pop sound. She would improvise melodies and record lyrical ideas, while Nowels would compose the accompanying chords. Together, they wrote nine songs in ten days, although the material did not reflect the album's eventual electronic direction. Three of those songs—"The Power of Good-Bye", "To Have and Not to Hold", and "Little Star"—were included on the album.

Madonna next reunited with Patrick Leonard, who had co-written and produced many of her songs in the late 1980s. Unlike their previous collaborations, however, their songwriting involved little studio production, as Madonna felt Leonard's approach would give the material "more of a Peter Gabriel vibe", a sound she did not want for the album. Other people she considered for collaboration included Robert Miles, Trent Reznor, and Nellee Hooper. Maverick Records chairman Guy Oseary then contacted British electronic musician William Orbit, who had previously remixed Madonna's songs "Justify My Love" (1990) and "Erotica" (1992); Oseary asked for the producer to send some songs to Madonna. Orbit responded with a digital audio tape that contained thirteen tracks. She also praised the remixes Orbit had produced for her and was interested in combining "a kind of futuristic sound" with "lots of Indian and Moroccan influences and things like that", wanting to create a record that sounded "old and new at the same time".

Orbit met Madonna at her home in New York City, where she played him the material she had recorded with other producers. The two then booked studio time at the Hit Factory in New York, where they worked on Madonna's vocals. Orbit then returned to England to collect his production equipment. They completed the latter part of the project at Larrabee Studio in North Hollywood, where they worked in what he described as "a more conventional way". Orbit would frequently present Madonna with a tape of musical ideas he had been developing, consisting mainly of eight- or sixteen-bar phrases and stripped-down versions of tracks that would later appear on the album. Madonna listened to Orbit's musical sketches until they inspired lyrics and melodies. Once she had developed a song's direction, she returned to Orbit, and together they expanded the original compositions. The only exception was "Mer Girl", which Madonna recorded largely as presented, completing the vocal in a single take. She also reworked the songs she had written with Leonard alongside Orbit.

It took a long time to do the album, months. And it wasn't like we were slacking. We actually did have to work fast, and there were many times when we had to move on. One of Madonna's favorite phrases was: "Don't gild the lily". In other words, keep it rough, and don't perfect it too much. It's a natural urge for computer buffs to perfect everything because they can, and we were very wary of that.

— Orbit in an interview with Keyboard

The recording of Ray of Light spanned four and a half months, the longest of Madonna's career to that point. For most of it, only three other people were in the studio with her: Orbit, engineer Pat McCarthy, and his assistant engineer, Matt Silva. Orbit recalled that he and Madonna did not follow a "strict method of working", instead changing their approach throughout the sessions, which he believed contributed to the album's "quite varied" sound. The sessions were initially hindered by technical issues, as Orbit preferred using samples and synthesizer sounds instead of live musicians. Frequent computer malfunctions caused delays, with recording having to be postponed until the equipment was repaired. Orbit brought much of his own equipment to the sessions and performed nearly all of the instrumentation himself, including guitar. He later recalled playing for such extended periods in the studio that his fingers bled.

After errors were identified in her pronunciation of the Sanskrit shloka "Yoga Taravali" used in "Shanti/Ashtangi", the BBC arranged for Madonna to receive telephone lessons from Sanskrit scholar Vagish Shastri. She then re-recorded the affected vocals with the corrected pronunciation for the album. Additionally, Orbit revealed that the song "Drowned World/Substitute for Love" retained what was originally intended as a rough demo mix because he and Madonna felt following changes diminished the recording. Aside from the vocals, the songs' overall soundscapes were generated from his Akai S3200 and processed through a tube-based audio compressor. Following the album's release, Orbit mentioned that there was a "whole album's worth" of outtake tracks. He explained that listening to those songs would offer a different perspective on the album as a whole.

== Composition ==
=== Music ===
"Frozen" (1998)
"Frozen" is a slow tempo dance track featuring Madonna's vocals over layers of string arrangements and synthesizers.

"Nothing Really Matters" (1998)
"Nothing Really Matters" is an eclectic electronic dance music track. Towards the end of the sample, the bleeping sounds can be heard from the right to the left.

Ray of Light marked a departure from the contemporary R&B and pop sound of Bedtime Stories (1994). It embraced an electronica, trip hop, techno-pop, and new-age sound that incorporated elements of house, ambient, drum and bass, rock, new wave, eastern and classical music. Despite these descriptions, Madonna rejected suggestions that Ray of Light was primarily a techno or electronic album, insisting that it was fundamentally a pop record. The album's sound bears similarities to Orbit's background in ambient-oriented mood music. He and Madonna produced the album using live percussion, electric guitars, and analog synthesizers. Critics described the resulting production as "futuristic", "avant-garde", "experimental", and "innovative". (Note: Cited to multiple sources:)

Throughout Ray of Light, electronic elements complement, rather than dominate, the arrangements, as observed by Rob Sheffield of Rolling Stone. The title track, "Ray of Light", is the only song that adopts a more overt, high-tempo techno style. Electronic rhythms combined with orchestral textures characterize "Drowned World/Substitute for Love" and "Frozen"; "Skin" and "Nothing Really Matters" feature hardstep beats and an ambient production. "Swim" includes glitch-like textural effects, and "Frozen" employs fluid synthesizer arpeggios. Elements of Latin music are exhibited on "To Have and Not to Hold", while "Shanti/Ashtangi", "Sky Fits Heaven", and "Nothing Really Matters" reflect Madonna's study of Buddhism and Hinduism. Ray of Light's first three tracks—"Drowned World/Substitute for Love", "Swim" and "Ray of Light"—share a similar midtempo rhythm, with rock guitar elements reminiscent of Oasis and dense layers of synthesizers.

Compared to her previous albums, Madonna's vocals on Ray of Light display greater range, as well as a fuller timbre. Writing for PopMatters, Peter Piatkowski observed that Madonna sings in a higher register on "Frozen", incorporating subtle Eastern influences into her vocal delivery. Joe Lynch of Billboard wrote that her vocals on the album were more "nuanced and full-bodied", while Stuart Maconie stated in Q that she pitched her vocals "half an octave lower" and sang in a faintly English-inflected accent. Madonna studied with a vocal coach during the filming of Evita and discovered what she described to Spin as "a whole piece of [her] voice [she] wasn't using". She said the voice training "opened [her] up immeasurably" and allowed her to do "things with [her] voice that [she] never thought were possible". She also attributed her year-long yoga practice to helping her voice and influencing her singing.

=== Lyrics and themes ===
"The Power of Good-Bye" (1998)
In the electronica ballad "The Power of Good-Bye", Madonna sings about freedom and empowerment following the end of a relationship.

"Drowned World/Substitute for Love" (1998)
In the lyrics of the ambient pop track "Drowned World/Substitute for Love". Madonna seeks authentic love over superficial alliances.

Multiple critics identified Ray of Light as Madonna's most thoughtful and personal release since her fourth studio album, Like a Prayer (1989). The songs on Ray of Light explore themes such as the impermanence of fame, motherhood, enlightenment, and spirituality. The singer stated that the album reflected her state in life, both in terms of her musical interests and her personal beliefs. Biographer J. Randy Taraborrelli observed that, as opposed to her previous releases—which featured often sexual references—the album contained no mentions of bondage or oral sex. The themes on Ray of Light were largely shaped by the spiritual and philosophical ideas Madonna had explored in the years leading up to its release; she drew on Hinduism, Buddhism, Kabbalah, and yoga.

Maternal themes are particularly evident on songs including "Nothing Really Matters", "Little Star", and "Mer Girl"; the title track reflects her altered perspective on life following the birth of her child. Madonna credited motherhood with shaping the album's themes, stating that it would have been very different otherwise. Ray of Light also explores romantic relationships: "Frozen" and "The Power of Good-Bye" were inspired by the breakdowns of Madonna's relationships with Carlos Leon and Sean Penn, respectively, while "Drowned World/Substitute for Love" and "To Have and Not to Hold" examine romantic disillusionment and the aftermath of lost love. Spiritual themes are prominent on "Shanti/Ashtangi" and "Sky Fits Heaven", which were inspired by her interest in Eastern spirituality. Other themes addressed on Ray of Light include social consciousness in "Swim", romantic desire in "Skin", and grief in "Mer Girl".

=== Songs ===
The opening track and third single, "Drowned World/Substitute For Love", is a downtempo ballad influenced by jungle, drum and bass, and trip hop music. The title is inspired by J. G. Ballard's post-apocalyptic science fiction novel The Drowned World (1962). "Swim", the second song, has a spiritual tone. She sings: "Swim to the ocean floor/So that we can begin again/Wash away all our sins/Crash to the other shore". "Ray of Light", the third track and second single, is an uptempo electronic dance-pop song with strong techno and trance influences. A "sonically progressive" track, it also incorporates elements of rock, with a prominent electric guitar riff. Its sound effects include whistles and bleeps. "Candy Perfume Girl" has a grunge intro and continues to pair post-modern beeps and beats with old-fashioned electric guitar flare-ups. In the next song, "Skin", Madonna sings "Do I know you from somewhere?" in a yearning voice over the beats of an electronic orchestra.

The sixth track, "Nothing Really Matters", is an uptempo dance track with techno influences. "Sky Fits Heaven" focuses on Madonna's spiritual studies and her daughter Lourdes. Lyrics include: "Sky fits heaven so fly it, that's what the prophet said to me/Child fits mother so hold your baby tight, that's what my future can see". Elements of the lyric are taken from the poem What Fits? by poet Max Blagg, the poem used for a 1993 advertisement for Gap Inc. "Shanti/Ashtangi" is a Hindu prayer and up-tempo techno song sung by Madonna in Sanskrit, over a driving dance rhythm. The techno dance track features Madonna singing an adapted version of Shankaracharya entirely in Sanskrit, with lines such as "Vunde gurunam caranaravinde/Sandarsita svatma sukhavabodhe".

"Frozen", the ninth track and the album's first single, is a mid-tempo electronic ballad with a layered sound enhanced by synthesizers and strings. The song additionally contains ambient qualities, a moderate dance rhythm during the chorus and techno-influenced beats toward the end. Madonna's vocals throughout the song lack vibrato and have drawn comparisons to medieval music. Lyrically, the song is about a cold and emotionless man; nevertheless, subtexts have been noticed. According to Jarman-Ivens, lyrics such as "You're frozen, when your heart's not open" reflected an artistic palette, "encompassing diverse musical, textual and visual styles in its lyrics." "The Power of Good-Bye" is an emotional ballad that lyrically meditates on loss and longing. It was released as the album's fourth single. "To Have and Not to Hold" is about a distant lover and "Little Star" is about her daughter, Lourdes. Both are superficially vibrant, but subtlety and restrained arrangements prevail beneath the surface. "Mer Girl", the album's final track, is a surreal meditation on mortality and the death of Madonna's mother Madonna Fortin Ciccone, in which she sings, "And I smelled her burning flesh/Her rotting bones, her decay/I ran and I ran/I'm still running away." "She stepped out of the vocal booth," Orbit recalled of its recording, "and everybody was rooted to the spot. It was just one of those moments. Really spooky."

== Title and artwork ==
According to spokesperson Liz Rosenberg, Madonna considered titling the album Mantra, which she thought was a "really cool title", and also considered calling it Veronica Electronica; however, she discarded both of those ideas and called it Ray of Light, as her studio albums up to that point were always titled after one of the songs from each album's tracklist.

The artwork is taken from a November 28, 1997 photo shoot with photographer Mario Testino. For the styling, Madonna and stylist Lori Goldstein chose textures evocative of water and air, recurring themes on the album. For the album cover, Madonna wears a turquoise Dolce & Gabbana Spring/Summer 1998 vinyl raincoat. Other pictures from the same shoot were used as the artwork for the "Ray of Light" and "Frozen" singles, in which Madonna models items from Prada's Spring/Summer 1998 collection. Madonna and Testino had previously collaborated for a Versace brand collection two years earlier. Madonna was impressed with the natural look Testino had captured, so she booked him again for the album's photo shoot. He recalled, "At 2pm she said, 'OK, I'm tired. We're done'. And I said, 'But I don't have the pictures yet'. She said, 'You're working for me and I say we're done'. I said, 'No, we carry on'. The picture she used on the cover came after that".

== Release and promotion ==
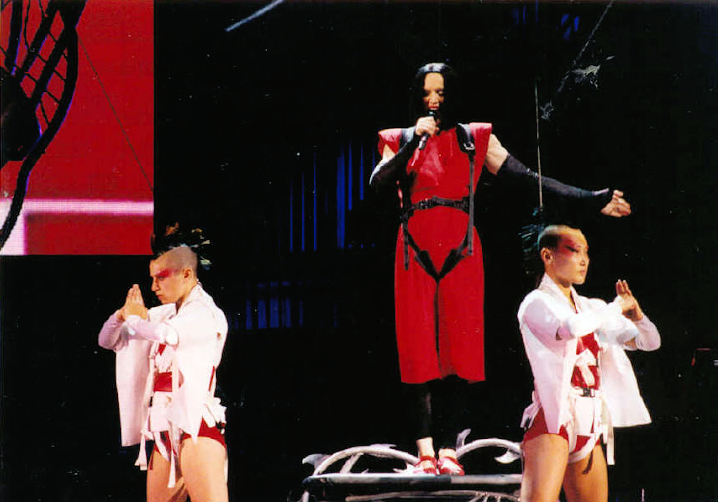
Madonna performing promotional single "Sky Fits Heaven", during the Drowned World Tour in 2001

Ray of Light was released in Japan on February 22, 1998, with an additional Japan-only bonus track "Has to Be". The album was later released in the United States on March 3, 1998. In New Zealand, a box set of Ray of Light and the 1990 compilation The Immaculate Collection was released to accompany the album. It reached number 12 on the albums chart and was certified gold by the Recording Industry Association of New Zealand (RIANZ) for shipment of 7,500 copies. A promotional in-store VHS compilation titled Rays of Light was released in the United Kingdom in 1999, compiling all the music videos to all five singles from the album. All five videos were later included in the compilation The Video Collection 93:99 (1999). "Sky Fits Heaven" was released as a promotional single in the United States. It peaked at number 41 on the Billboard Hot Dance Club Play chart.

To promote the album, Madonna made several televised appearances and gave live performances of its songs. On February 14, 1998, she debuted "Sky Fits Heaven", "Shanti/Ashtangi" and "Ray of Light" at Roxy NYC nightclub. "Frozen" was performed on The National Lottery Show in the UK (February 21), 1998 Sanremo Music Festival in Italy (February 24), Wetten, dass..? in Germany (February 28) and The Rosie O'Donnell Show in the United States (March 13). On April 27, Madonna made an unannounced appearance at the Rock for the Rainforest benefit concert at Carnegie Hall in New York City to sing "Frozen". She also joined the other stars of the concert, including Sting, Elton John, and Billy Joel to perform "With a Little Help From My Friends" and "Twist and Shout" with them. On May 29, Madonna appeared on The Oprah Winfrey Show and sang "Little Star" and "Ray of Light" there. On September 10, she opened the 1998 MTV Video Music Awards in New York City with a performance of "Shanti/Ashtangi" and "Ray of Light" featuring Lenny Kravitz on guitar. "The Power of Good-Bye" was sung at the 1998 MTV Europe Music Awards in Italy (November 12) and Top of the Pops in the UK (November 19). On February 24, 1999, Madonna performed "Nothing Really Matters" at the 41st Grammy Awards ceremony at Shrine Auditorium in Los Angeles.

Madonna performed "Drowned World/Substitute For Love", "Ray of Light", "Candy Perfume Girl", "Sky Fits Heaven", "Frozen", and "Mer Girl" on the Drowned World Tour, her fifth concert tour, which promoted Ray of Light and its follow-up, Music (2000). It started in June 2001 and was Madonna's first tour in eight years. The tour had been planned before the new millennium, but she had become pregnant with her son Rocco Ritchie, released the album Music that year, and married British filmmaker Guy Ritchie in December 2000. The show was divided into five sections: Cyber-Punk, Geisha, Cowgirl, Spanish, and Ghetto. The Drowned World Tour received positive reviews. The tour was a commercial success, grossing US$75 million, and was the top concert tour by a solo artist in 2001. The concert was broadcast live on HBO from The Palace of Auburn Hills in Auburn Hills, Michigan, on August 26, 2001. The Drowned World Tour 2001 DVD was released in all regions on November 13, 2001. Like the original airing of the show, the DVD received positive reviews. The photographs used on the DVD packaging were taken by Madonna's friend Rosie O'Donnell.

== Singles ==
"Frozen" was released as the lead single from the album on January 23, 1998. It peaked within the top five in most music markets worldwide, while topping the singles chart in Finland, Italy, Spain and on the United Kingdom Singles Chart, where it became Madonna's first single to debut at number one. It became her sixth single to peak at number two on the Billboard Hot 100, setting a record for Madonna as the artist with most number-two hits in the chart history. The song received critical acclaim, and was labeled a masterpiece with a "cinematic" sound. However, the Belgian court in 2005 ruled that the song's opening four-bar theme was plagiarized from the song "Ma vie fout le camp", composed by Salvatore Acquaviva. The ruling forbade the sale of the single and the entire Ray of Light album, as well as other compilations that included the track in Belgium. In February 2014, a Belgian court ruled that Madonna did not plagiarize Acquaviva's work for "Frozen". The court spoke of a "new capital offense" in the file: composer Edouard Scotto Di Suoccio and societies Tabata Atoll Music and Music in Paris had also filed a complaint for plagiarism. According to them, both "Ma vie fout le camp" and "Frozen" originated in the song "Blood Night" which they composed in 1983. After all three tracks in the case were compared, the final ruling found that the songs were "not sufficiently 'original' to claim" that any plagiarism had taken place. This ruling ended the eight-year ban of the song that was in place in Belgium since 2005.

The album's second single, "Ray of Light", was released on April 27, 1998. It peaked at number one in Spain and reached the top five in Canada, Finland, Italy, the United Kingdom, and the United States. It entered the Hot 100 at number five, becoming Madonna's highest debut on the chart ever. The song was also a hit on the Hot Dance Club Play chart, remaining at number one for four weeks and becoming the "Top Hot Dance Club Play Single" of 1998. Critics also responded positively, praising its club-oriented yet "sonically progressive" sound, as well as Madonna's powerful vocals.

"Drowned World/Substitute for Love" was released on August 24, 1998, as the third single outside the United States. It reached number one in Spain and the top ten in Italy and the United Kingdom. The music video, directed by Walter Stern, caused controversy due to scenes that featured Madonna being chased by paparazzi on motorcycles, a scenario similar to Princess Diana's death in 1997.

The fourth single, "The Power of Good-Bye", was released on September 1, 1998. It reached the top ten in Austria, Canada, the Netherlands, Finland, Germany, Italy, Spain, Sweden, Switzerland, and the United Kingdom. In the United States, the song peaked at number eleven on the Hot 100. Its music video was directed by Matthew Rolston. "Little Star" was released as a double A-side single with "The Power of Good-Bye" in the United Kingdom on November 23, 1998.

"Nothing Really Matters" was released as the album's sixth and final single on March 2, 1999. It became a top-ten hit in Canada, Finland, Italy, New Zealand, and the United Kingdom. In the United States, it became Madonna's lowest-charting single on the Hot 100, peaking at number 93, but reached number one on the dance chart. Its music video, directed by Johan Renck, was inspired by Arthur Golden's book Memoirs of a Geisha, and features Madonna dressed as a geisha.

== Critical reception ==
Contemporaneous reviews
Review scores
Source	Rating
Chicago Tribune	3.5/4 stars
Entertainment Weekly	A−
The Guardian	4/5 stars
NME	8/10
Now	2/5 stars
Q	4/5 stars
Rolling Stone	4/5 stars
The Sydney Morning Herald	3/5 stars
USA Today	4/4 stars

Retrospective reviews and music guides
Review scores
Source	Rating
AllMusic	5/5 stars
Encyclopedia of Popular Music	5/5 stars
MusicHound Rock	3/5 stars
Pitchfork	8.1/10
The Rolling Stone Album Guide	4.5/5 stars
Slant Magazine	4/5 stars
Tom Hull – on the Web	B+
The Virgin Encyclopedia of Nineties Music	4/5 stars

Ray of Light received universal acclaim from critics. Stephen Thomas Erlewine from AllMusic called it Madonna's "most adventurous record" and "most mature and restrained album". Paul Verna of Billboard commented: "Easily her most mature and personal work to date, Ray of Light finds Madonna weaving lyrics with the painstaking intimacy of diary entries and wrapping them in hymn-like melodies and instrumentation swathed in lush, melancholy ambience—with forays into classic house, trance, and even guitar pop. Of course, she balances the set's serious tone with chewy pop nuggets that allow her to flex her immeasurably widened vocal range to fine effect." He finished the review by calling the album "a deliciously adventurous, ultimately victorious effort from one of pop music's most compelling performers." Sal Cinquemani of Slant Magazine described the album as "one of the great pop masterpieces of the '90s" and stated that: "Its lyrics are uncomplicated but its statement is grand" and "Madonna hasn't been this emotionally candid since Like a Prayer". Rob Sheffield's review for Rolling Stone called the album "brilliant", but was critical of Orbit's production, saying that he doesn't know enough tricks to produce a whole album, and so becomes repetitive. "Until Simply Red enlist John Zorn, or Mariah Carey works with Tortoise," Stuart Maconie wrote in Q, "she remains the only pop aristocrat who's keeping her ears open."

David Browne of Entertainment Weekly wrote: "For all her grapplings with self-enlightenment, Madonna seems more relaxed and less contrived than she's been in years, from her new Italian earth-mother makeover to, especially, her music. Ray of Light is truly like a prayer, and you know she'll take you there." Roni Sarig, in City Pages, was most impressed by Madonna's vocal range, depth, and clarity and called Ray of Light "her richest, most accomplished record yet". Robert Hilburn of the Los Angeles Times wrote: "One reason why her new Ray of Light is the most satisfying album of her career is that it reflects the soul-searching of a woman who is at a point in her life where she can look at herself with surprising candor and perspective." In Melody Maker, Mark Roland drew comparisons with St Etienne and Björk's Homogenic album, highlighting Ray of Light's lack of cynicism as its most positive aspect: "It's not an album turned on the lathe of cynical pop manipulation, rather it's been squished out of a lump of clay on a foot-powered wheel. Lovingly teased into life, Ray of Light is like the ugly mug that doesn't match but is all the more special because of it." Joan Anderman from The Boston Globe said Ray of Light is a remarkable album. He described it as a deeply spiritual dance record, ecstatically textured, a serious cycle of songs that goes a long way toward liberating Madonna from a career built on scavenged images and cultivated identities. Robert Christgau was less impressed in Playboy, deeming it a "great-sounding" but average record because enlightenment themes always yield awkward results for pop entertainers. However, he praised sensual songs such as "Skin" and "Candy Perfume Girl".

== Commercial performance ==
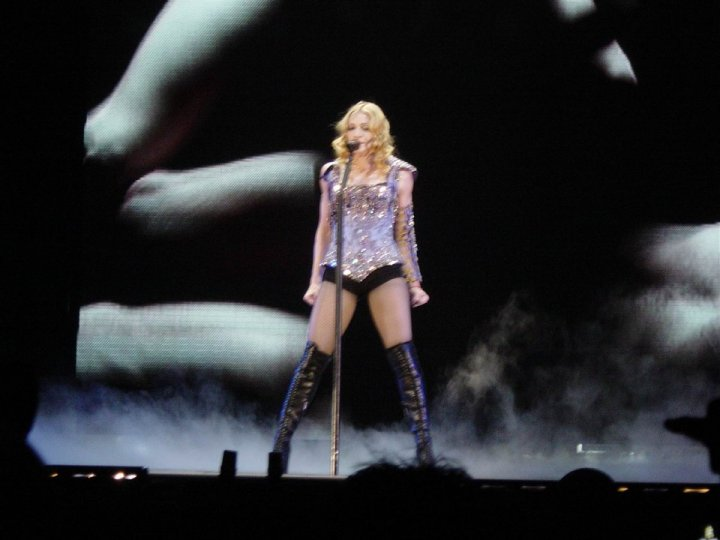
Madonna performing the album's lead single "Frozen" on the Re-Invention World Tour in 2004

Upon its release, Ray of Light topped the official charts of 17 countries. It broke the record as Warner Music Group's album with most shipments before its release at 2.5 million units worldwide, excluding the U.S. The album managed to sell 3 million copies in five days. With over 16 million copies, Ray of Light is one of the best-selling albums by women.

In the United States, Ray of Light debuted at number two on the Billboard 200 albums chart on the issue dated March 21, 1998. It set the record for biggest first-week sales by a female artist in Nielsen SoundScan era at that time with 371,000 copies sold. However, the album was not able to top the soundtrack album of the motion picture Titanic, becoming Madonna's fifth album to peak at the runner-up position. During the second week, the album sold 225,000 copies and was still kept off the top spot by the soundtrack. On March 16, 2000, the album was certified four times platinum by the Recording Industry Association of America (RIAA) for shipments of four million units of the album. Madonna became the first female artist to have seven multi-platinum studio albums by RIAA. According to Nielsen SoundScan, Ray of Light had sold 3,900,000 copies in the United States as of February 2023. This figure does not include units sold through clubs like the BMG Music, where the album sold over 459,000 copies. In Canada, the album debuted at number one on the Canadian Albums Chart with first-week sales of 59,900 copies. It was later certified seven-times platinum by the Canadian Recording Industry Association (CRIA) for shipment of 700,000 copies.

Ray of Light achieved commercial success in Latin America, being certified 3× platinum in Argentina for 180,000 copies recognized by Cámara Argentina de Productores de Fonogramas y Videogramas (CAPIF) and platinum in Brazil for shipments of over 250,000 units certified by Associação Brasileira dos Produtores de Discos (ABPD). In Mexico, initial shipments of the album were 30,000 units. The album also achieved commercial success in Oceania, debuting at number one on the albums chart in Australia and New Zealand. It was certified triple platinum by Australian Recording Industry Association (ARIA) and platinum by Recording Industry Association of New Zealand (RIANZ) for shipments of 210,000 and 15,000 copies respectively. Ray of Light became the best-selling album from Warner Music in the Asia-Pacific region during 1998, and sold over one million copies in Asia as of June 1999.

Ray of Light achieved its strongest commercial reception in European countries, where it topped the European Top 100 Albums chart and was certified seven times platinum by the International Federation of the Phonographic Industry (IFPI) for sales of seven million copies, becoming the ninth best-selling album in Europe for the 1998–2007 period. In the United Kingdom, Ray of Light debuted at number one on the UK Albums Chart with opening sales of nearly 139,000 copies and remained at the top spot for two weeks. It was certified six times platinum by the British Phonographic Industry (BPI) for shipment of 1.8 million copies. As of 2018, the album sold 1,730,000 units in the UK according to Official Charts Company. In France, Ray of Light entered the albums chart at number two, staying there for seven weeks before descending the chart. It was certified three times platinum by the Syndicat National de l'Édition Phonographique (SNEP) for shipments of 900,000 copies. In Germany, the album reached number one on the Media Control Charts and remained there for seven weeks. It remains Madonna's best-selling album in Germany, with a triple-platinum certification from Bundesverband Musikindustrie (BVMI) for shipment of 1.5 million copies. In the rest of Europe, Ray of Light topped the official charts of Belgium, Netherlands, Finland, Greece, Hungary, Italy, Norway, Spain and Switzerland.

== Accolades ==
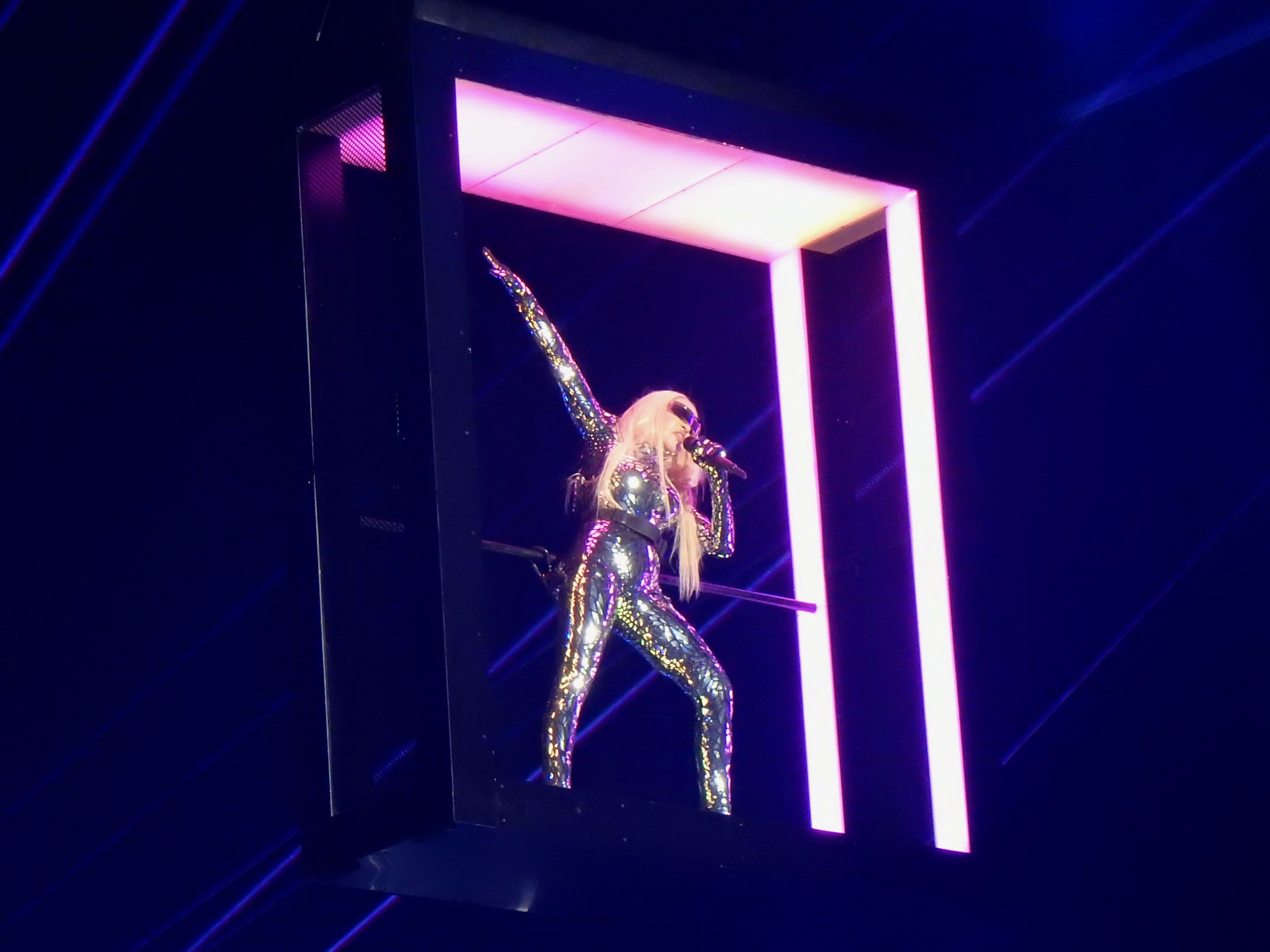
Madonna performed "Ray of Light" on the Celebration Tour (2023―2024). The song won an MTV Video Music Award for Video of the Year and a Grammy Award for Best Dance Recording.

At the 41st Annual Grammy Awards, Ray of Light won four awards from six nominations. The album won Best Pop Album and Best Recording Package, and was nominated for Album of the Year, while the title track won Best Dance Recording and Best Short Form Music Video, and was nominated for Record of the Year. The album gave Madonna the first music Grammy of her career, as she had previously won only in the video category. Madonna also became the biggest winner of the 1998 MTV Video Music Awards, winning six awards from nine nominations. "Frozen" won Best Special Effects; "Ray of Light" won Best Choreography, Best Direction, Best Editing, Best Female Video and Video of the Year, and was also nominated for Best Cinematography, Best Dance Video and Breakthrough Video. The American Society of Composers, Authors and Publishers (ASCAP) honored Madonna with two Most Performed Song awards for "Frozen" and "Ray of Light" at the 1999 ASCAP Pop Music Awards, as well as Top Dance Song for "Ray of Light" at the 1999 ASCAP Rhythm & Soul Music Awards.

Ray of Light also gave Madonna several trophies from various international award shows—including two Danish Grammy Awards for Best International Album and Best International Female Vocalist from IFPI Denmark, a Fryderyk award for Best Foreign Album from Związek Producentów Audio Video (ZPAV) in Poland, a Golden Giraffe Award for International Pop Album of the Year from Mahasz in Hungary, two Porin awards for Best International Album and Best International Video ("Frozen") in Croatia, and two Rockbjörnen awards for Best International Album and Best International Artist in Sweden.

In Canada, Madonna won Best International Video for "Ray of Light" at the 1999 MuchMusic Video Awards and was nominated for Best Selling Album (Foreign or Domestic) at the 1999 Juno Awards. She also received Best Female and Best Album trophies at the 1998 MTV Europe Music Awards. At the 14th annual International Dance Music Awards, Madonna won Best Dance Solo Artist and Best Dance Video for "Ray of Light".

== Legacy ==
Ray of Light has been credited for bringing electronica music into global pop culture. The Los Angeles Times noted that "aside from occasional breakthroughs such as Fatboy Slim, electronica wasn't totally mainstream fare when Madonna released Ray of Light." Until the album brought the genre to the top of music charts, according to author J. Randy Taraborrelli, "techno and electronica had, for years, been the music played at so-called raves, hugely popular, illegal underground parties taking place in abandoned warehouse and deserted areas on the outskirts of town all around the world." AllMusic editor Liana Jonas stated that the album's title track has "brought mainstream attention to electronica music, which ascended from its underground status to wild popularity in the early 21st century." Observer's writer Daryl Deino called Ray of Light "a risk-taking album that helped define mainstream electronic dance music."

Elliott H. Powell in an American Studies study for New York University observed that Ray of Light made South Asian culture accessible to the American public in the 1990s. Rhonda Hammer and Douglas Kellner in their book Media/Cultural Studies: Critical Approaches recalled that "the phenomenon of South Asian-inspired femininity as a Western media trend can be traced to February 1998, when pop icon Madonna released her video 'Frozen'." They explained that "although Madonna did not initiate the fashion for Indian beauty accessories [...] she did propel it into the public eye by attracting the attention of the worldwide media."

According to Taraborrelli, the album has been hailed as bold and refreshing in music of the late 1990s, which was dominated by boy bands and teenage artists such as the Backstreet Boys, NSYNC, Britney Spears and Christina Aguilera. Larry Flick from Billboard said that the album "not only provided the chameleon-like artist with her first universally applauded critical success, it has also proved that she remains a vital figure among woefully fickle young audiences." Journalists have discussed how the album affected Madonna's career and public perception. According to Billboard's Kristen S. Hé, Ray of Light remains her most critically acclaimed album, as of 2020. Music critic Lucy O'Brien commented: "1998's Ray of Light certainly rehabilitated Madonna's image. Up to that point she had still been written off as an average pop glamour girl who got lucky, but with this record she reached a whole new audience, proving that she was a good songwriter with an intensely productive talent." Mary von Aue from Stereogum stated that "Ray of Light reestablished Madonna as a groundbreaking artist", and Nick Levine of Dazed said the Ray of Light era "won Madonna the kind of critical acclaim she’d never enjoyed in the past". For PopMatters, Peter Piatkowski observed that the album effectively divided Madonna's career into two distinct eras: "those who followed her career from the beginning in 1982 ... would find themselves choosing one camp over the other: the music before Ray of Light was arguably more accessible and radio-friendly", whereas her subsequent works would contain at least some elements of the experimental electronic dance music she had embraced on Ray of Light.

Ray of Light has been featured on numerous critics' lists of greatest albums of all time. Rolling Stone magazine placed the album at number 367 on the list of 500 Greatest Albums of All Time. In September 2020, an updated edition of the Rolling Stone list was published, showing the album rising 145 spots, at number 222. In 2001, a quarter of a million music fans on VH1 voted Ray of Light as the 10th of "100 Best Albums of All Time". In 2003, Ray of Light was allocated at number 17 on Q magazine readers' list of "100 Greatest Albums Ever". The album is also included in the book 1001 Albums You Must Hear Before You Die. Mojo magazine also listed Ray of Light at number 29 on "100 Modern Classics: The Greatest Albums of Our Lifetime". In 2013, the album was also included at number 241 on NME magazine's list of "The 500 Greatest Albums of All Time". Pitchfork ranked Ray of Light as the 55th best album of the 1990s, "Madonna's trying, with all her might, to evoke the blackest depths and most euphoric joys of the human heart. The album's title track sounds like it was forged inside a meteor; the surreal, pitch-black poem 'Mer Girl' is as still as death itself."

Ray of Light has also been influential on other artists' work. Canadian singer Nelly Furtado stated that she used it as a template for her album Loose (2006). Moreover, English singer Adele named the record as "one of the chief inspirations" for her third studio album, 25 (2015). Madonna herself has considered Ray of Light the most fulfilling evolution of her career, with her referencing it as the "quintessential Madonna album" in a 2013 Reddit AMA.

In 2025, Madonna released a companion remix album titled Veronica Electronica.

== Track listing ==
Ray of Light track listing
No.	Title	Writer(s)	Producer(s)	Length
1.	"Drowned World/Substitute for Love^{[a]}"	Madonna; William Orbit; Rod McKuen; Anita Kerr; David Collins	Madonna; Orbit	5:08
2.	"Swim"	Madonna; Orbit	Madonna; Orbit	5:00
3.	"Ray of Light"	Madonna; Orbit; Clive Muldoon; Dave Curtiss; Christine Leach	Madonna; Orbit	5:20
4.	"Candy Perfume Girl"	Madonna; Orbit; Susannah Melvoin	Madonna; Orbit	4:36
5.	"Skin"	Madonna; Patrick Leonard	Madonna; Orbit; Marius de Vries	6:21
6.	"Nothing Really Matters"	Madonna; Leonard	Madonna; Orbit; Vries	4:26
7.	"Sky Fits Heaven"	Madonna; Leonard	Madonna; Orbit; Leonard	4:47
8.	"Shanti/Ashtangi^{[b]}"	Madonna; Orbit	Madonna; Orbit	4:29
9.	"Frozen"	Madonna; Leonard	Madonna; Orbit; Leonard	6:12
10.	"The Power of Good-Bye"	Madonna; Rick Nowels	Madonna; Orbit; Leonard	4:12
11.	"To Have and Not to Hold"	Madonna; Nowels	Madonna; Orbit; Leonard	5:22
12.	"Little Star"	Madonna; Nowels	Madonna; Vries	5:18
13.	"Mer Girl^{[c]}"	Madonna; Orbit	Madonna; Orbit	5:31
Total length:				66:42

Japanese bonus track
No.	Title	Writer(s)	Producer(s)	Length
14.	"Has to Be"	Madonna; Orbit; Leonard	Madonna; Orbit	5:16
Total length:				71:58

=== Notes ===
- ^{^[a]} "Drowned World/Substitute for Love" contains a sample of "Why I Follow the Tigers", as performed by the San Sebastian Strings.
- ^{^[b]} "Shanti/Ashtangi" adapted from text by Shankaracharya, taken from the Yoga Taravali. Additional text: traditional; translation by Vyass Houston and Eddie Stern.
- ^{^[c]} "Mer Girl" contains an interpolation and elements from "Space" performed by Gábor Szabó.

== Personnel ==
Information is adapted from the album's liner notes.

- Madonna – vocals (2–5, 7–13, lead on 1, 6), producer
- William Orbit – producer, guitar, programming, sound effects
- Mike Bradford – programming
- Craig Armstrong – string arrangements (9–10)
- Pablo Cook – flute (2)
- Mark Endert – engineer
- Fergus Gerrand – drums (1–2), percussion (13)
- Kerosene Halo – design
- Niki Haris – background vocals (6)
- Vyass Houston – translation
- Jon Ingoldsby – engineer
- Ted Jensen – mastering
- Suzie Katayama – conductor
- Patrick Leonard – additional music arranger (9), producer
- Donna De Lory – background vocals (6)
- Patrick McCarthy – engineer
- Marc Moreau – guitar (5)
- Kevin Reagan – art direction, design
- Dave Reitzas – engineer
- Steve Sidelnyk – additional drum machine (6, 12)
- Matt Silva – engineer
- Eddie Stern – translation
- Mario Testino – photography
- Marius de Vries – keyboard (9), music programming (9), producer

== Charts ==
=== Weekly charts ===
Weekly chart performance
Chart (1998–1999)	Peak position
Australian Albums (ARIA)	1
Austrian Albums (Ö3 Austria)	2
Belgian Albums (Ultratop Flanders)	1
Belgian Albums (Ultratop Wallonia)	2
Brazilian Albums (Nopem/ABPD)	6
Canada Top Albums/CDs (RPM)	1
Canadian Albums (Billboard)	1
Czech Albums (ČNS IFPI)	2
Danish Albums (Hitlisten)	2
Dutch Albums (Album Top 100)	1
Estonian Albums (Eesti Top 10)	1
European Top 100 Albums (Music & Media)	1
Finnish Albums (Suomen virallinen lista)	1
French Albums (SNEP)	2
German Albums (Offizielle Top 100)	1
Greek Albums (IFPI Greece)	1
Hungarian Albums (MAHASZ)	1
Icelandic Albums (Tónlist)	4
Irish Albums (IRMA)	2
Israeli Albums (IFPI)	1
Italian Albums (FIMI)	1
Japanese Albums (Oricon)	7
Malaysian Albums (RIM)	4
New Zealand Albums (RMNZ)	1
Norwegian Albums (VG-lista)	1
Portuguese Albums (AFP)	6
Scottish Albums (Official Charts)	1
Singaporean Albums (SPVA)	1
Spanish Albums (AFYVE)	1
Swedish Albums (Sverigetopplistan)	2
Swiss Albums (Schweizer Hitparade)	1
Taiwanese International Albums (IFPI)	4
UK Albums (Official Charts)	1
US Billboard 200	2

Weekly chart performance
Chart (2000–2018)	Peak position
Croatian International Albums (HDU)	1
Polish Albums (ZPAV)	37
Spanish Albums (Promusicae)	76
US Top Catalog Albums (Billboard)	50
US Indie Store Album Sales (Billboard)	19

Weekly chart performance
Chart (2026)	Peak position
Japanese Top Albums Sales (Billboard Japan)	90
UK Albums Sales (OCC)	47

=== Year-end charts ===
Year-end chart performance
Chart (1998)	Position
Australian Albums (ARIA)	10
Austrian Albums (Ö3 Austria)	7
Belgian Albums (Ultratop Flanders)	5
Belgian Albums (Ultratop Wallonia)	11
Canadian Albums (SoundScan)	10
Danish Albums (Hitlisten)	5
Dutch Albums (Album Top 100)	4
European Top 100 Albums (Music & Media)	3
French Albums (SNEP)	10
German Albums (Offizielle Top 100)	4
Italian Albums (Musica e dischi)	9
Japanese Albums (Oricon)	94
New Zealand Albums (RMNZ)	16
Norway Russetid Period (VG-lista)	2
Norway Winter Period (VG-lista)	17
Spanish Albums (AFYVE)	26
Swedish Albums & Compilations (Sverigetopplistan)	2
Swiss Albums (Schweizer Hitparade)	4
UK Albums (OCC)	7
US Billboard 200	18

Year-end chart performance
Chart (1999)	Position
Australian Albums (ARIA)	61
Austrian Albums (Ö3 Austria)	21
Belgian Albums (Ultratop Flanders)	55
Belgian Albums (Ultratop Wallonia)	72
Danish Albums (Hitlisten)	42
Dutch Albums (Album Top 100)	19
French Albums (SNEP)	58
German Albums (Offizielle Top 100)	14
Norway Winter Period (VG-lista)	16
UK Albums (OCC)	29
US Billboard 200	98

Year-end chart performance
Chart (2000)	Position
Dutch Albums (Album Top 100)	89
UK Albums (OCC)	115

Year-end chart performance
Chart (2001)	Position
UK Albums (OCC)	191

=== All-time charts ===
All-time chart performance
Chart	Position
Irish Women Albums (IRMA)	50
UK Female Albums (OCC)	30

== Certifications and sales ==
Certifications and sales
Region	Certification	Certified units/sales
Argentina (CAPIF)	3× Platinum	180,000^{^}
Australia (ARIA)	3× Platinum	210,000^{^}
Austria (IFPI Austria)	2× Platinum	100,000^{*}
Belgium (BRMA)	Platinum	100,000
Brazil (Pro-Música Brasil)	Platinum	250,000^{*}
Canada (Music Canada)	7× Platinum	700,000^{^}
Denmark (IFPI Danmark)	5× Platinum	250,000^{^}
Finland (Musiikkituottajat)	Platinum	50,604
France (SNEP)	3× Platinum	1,000,000
Germany (BVMI)	3× Platinum	1,500,000^{^}
Hong Kong (IFPI Hong Kong)	Platinum	20,000^{*}
Israel	—	55,000
Italy (FIMI)	5× Platinum	600,000
Japan (RIAJ)	2× Platinum	400,000^{^}
Netherlands (NVPI)	3× Platinum	300,000^{^}
New Zealand (RMNZ)	Platinum	15,000^{^}
Norway (IFPI Norway)	2× Platinum	115,000
Poland (ZPAV)	2× Platinum	200,000^{*}
Russia	—	150,000
Singapore (RIAS)	Platinum	15,000^{*}
South Africa	—	43,000
Spain (Promusicae)	3× Platinum	300,000^{^}
Sweden (GLF)	3× Platinum	240,000^{^}
Switzerland (IFPI Switzerland)	3× Platinum	150,000^{^}
United Kingdom (BPI)	6× Platinum	1,800,000^{^}
United States (RIAA)	4× Platinum	4,359,000
Zimbabwe	—	3,000
Summaries
Asia	—	1,000,000 (Note: Sales for Ray of Light in Asia, as of June 1999)
Europe (IFPI)	7× Platinum	7,000,000^{*}
Worldwide	—	16,000,000
^{*} Sales figures based on certification alone.^{^} Shipments figures based on certification alone.

== Release history ==
Release history and formats for Ray of Light
Region	Date	Format(s)	Edition(s)	Ref.
Japan	February 22, 1998	CD; LP	Standard	
United Kingdom	March 2, 1998	CD; LP; cassette; mini-album	Standard; limited edition	
Germany	March 2, 1998	CD; LP; cassette; mini-album	Standard; limited edition	
United States	March 3, 1998	CD	Standard; limited edition	
Canada	March 3, 1998	CD	Standard; limited edition	
Japan	September 8, 1998	CD	Double edition	

== See also ==
- List of albums which have spent the most weeks on the UK Albums Chart
- List of best-selling albums by women
- List of best-selling albums in Europe
- List of best-selling albums in Austria
- List of best-selling albums in Germany
- List of number-one albums of 1998 (Australia)
- List of Canadian number-one albums of 1998
- List of European number-one hits of 1998
- List of number-one hits of 1998 (Germany)
- List of number-one hits of 1999 (Germany)
- List of number-one albums of 1998 (Spain)
- List of UK Albums Chart number ones of the 1990s

== Bibliography ==
- Bego, Mark (2000). Madonna: Blonde Ambition. Cooper Square Press. ISBN 978-0-8154-1051-5.
- DeRogartis, Jim (2003). Turn On Your Mind : Four Decades of Great Psychedelic Rock. Hal Leonard Corporation. ISBN 978-0-634-05548-5.
- Detweiler, Craig; Taylor, Barry (2003). A Matrix of Meanings: Finding God in Pop Culture. Baker Publishing Group. ISBN 978-0-8010-2417-7.
- Fouz-Hernández, Santiago; Jarman-Ivens, Freya (2004). Madonna's Drowned Worlds. Ashgate Publishing, Ltd. ISBN 0-7546-3372-1.
- Gay, Leslie C.; Lysloff, René T. A. (2013). Music and Technoculture. Wesleyan University Press. ISBN 978-0-8195-7441-1.
- Gopinath, Gayatri (2005). Impossible Desires: Queer Diasporas and South Asian Public Cultures. Duke University Press. ISBN 978-0-8223-3513-9.
- Guilbert, Georges-Claude (2002). Madonna As Postmodern Myth: How One Star's Self-Construction Rewrites Sex, Gender, Hollywood and the American Dream. McFarland & Company. ISBN 0-7864-1408-1.
- Metz, Allen; Benson, Carol (1999). The Madonna Companion: Two Decades of Commentary. Music Sales Group. ISBN 0-8256-7194-9.
- O'Brien, Lucy (2007). Madonna: Like an Icon. HarperCollins. ISBN 978-0-593-05547-2.
- Taraborrelli, Randy J. (2002). Madonna: An Intimate Biography. Simon & Schuster. ISBN 0-7432-2880-4.
- Vorrath, Armin (2011). Eine außersinnliche Odyssee zu Madonna [An Extraordinary Odyssey to Madonna]. Books on Demand. ISBN 978-3-8423-8112-4.
