= Together (John Farnham and Allison Durbin album) =

Studio album by Johnny Farnham, Allison Durbin
- Released: September 1971
- Recorded: February–June 1971
- Genre: Pop
- Label: His Master's Voice/EMI

Johnny Farnham chronology
The Best of Johnny Farnham (1971)	Together (1971)	Johnny Farnham Sings the Shows (1972)

Together is a studio album of duets by Australian pop singers John Farnham (known then as Johnny Farnham) and Allison Durbin, which was released on His Master's Voice for EMI Records in September 1971. It peaked at No. 20 on the Australian Go-Set's Albums Chart.

Farnham had earlier No. 1 singles with "Sadie" in 1968 and his cover of "Raindrops Keep Fallin' on My Head" in 1970; he was the reigning 'King of Pop' on Go-Set's popularity polls during 1969–1971. New Zealand-born, Durbin had a hit with "I Have Loved Me a Man" in 1968 and was 'Best Female Artist' for the same Go-Set polls. A Farnham and Durbin duet single, "Baby, Without You", was released in November and reached No. 16 on the Go-Set Singles Chart.

== Background ==
As Johnny Farnham he had his first No. 1 single on the Go-Set National Singles Charts with the novelty song "Sadie (The Cleaning Lady)". Selling 180,000 copies in Australia, "Sadie" was the highest selling single by an Australian artist of the decade. His second No. 1 was a cover of B. J. Thomas' "Raindrops Keep Fallin' on My Head", which peaked at No. 1 for seven weeks in January–March 1970. A non-album single, "Comic Conversation" was released in October 1970 and peaked at No. 10 on the Go-Set National Top 60 Singles Chart and was still charting in March 1971. His fifth album, Johnny was released in August, which peaked at No. 24 on the Kent Music Report Albums Charts. Another non-album single, "Acapulco Sun" had been released in May and peaked at No. 21 on the Go-Set Top 60, but there were no charting singles from Johnny. Aside from Johnny, Farnham also released a compilation, The Best of Johnny Farnham, and a duet album with Allison Durbin, Together, all in 1971.

Together released in September peaked at No. 20 on the Go-Set Albums Chart. A Farnham and Durbin duet single, "Baby, Without You", was released in November and reached No. 16 on Go-Set Singles Chart.

== Track listing ==
Side A

1. "Baby Without You" – 2:27
2. "The Green Green Grass Is Dying" – 2:44
3. "You're Alright with Me" – 2:26
4. "Stay Awhile" – 3:29
5. "I Don't Mind the Rain" - 2;28
6. "Singing Our Song" – 2:54

Side B

1. "That's Old Fashioned" – 3:13
2. "Come on Round to My Place" – 2:16
3. "Aint Nothing Like the Real Thing" – 2:17
4. "Nobody Knows" – 2:26
5. "Better Put Your Love Away" – 2:32
6. "Get Together" – 3:22

== Chart positions ==
Year	Chart	Peak position	Catalogue #
1971	Go-Set Albums Chart	20	Axis 6000
1971	Kent Music Report Albums Chart	22	Axis 6000
