= Noche de cuatro lunas =

Noche de Cuatro Lunas

Studio album by Julio Iglesias
- Released: June 2000
- Genres: Latin pop, vocal, salsa
- Length: 56:29
- Labels: Columbia, Sony
- Producers: Tomás Muñoz (exec.), Robi Rosa

Julio Iglesias chronology
Mia Vita: I Mie Successi (1998)	Noche de Cuatro Lunas (2000)	Ao Meu Brasil (2001)

Singles from Noche de cuatro lunas
- 1. "Gozar la vida" Released: May 2000

Noche de Cuatro Lunas (Night of Four Moons) is a 2000 album by Julio Iglesias.

== Track listing ==
1. "Gozar la Vida" (3:44)
2. "Día a Día" (4:35)
3. "Me Siento de Aquí" (4:29)
4. "Te Voy a Contar Mi Vida" (4:54)
5. "No Es Amor Ni Es Amar (Gone Too Far)" (4:29)
6. "Corazón Partío" (4:48)
7. "Seremos Libres" (5:05)
8. "Dos Corazones, Dos Historias (Dos Corações e Uma Historia)" (with Alejandro Fernández) (3:55)
9. "Mal Acostumbrado (Mal Acostumada)" (4:53)
10. "Vida (4:08)
11. "Mamacita (Paparico)" (3:35)
12. "La Empalizada" (3:35)
13. "Noche de Cuatro Lunas (American Lady)" (4:04)

=== Brazilian version ===
The track "Gozar la Vida" in the Brazilian version, the original is replaced by a sung version in Portuguese called "Viver a Vida" with the participation of Daniel, a greatest Julio's fan.

== Charts ==
=== Weekly charts ===
Weekly chart performance for Noche de Cuatro Lunas
Chart (2000)	Peak
Argentine Albums (CAPIF)	5
Belgian Albums (Ultratop Flanders)	22
Belgian Albums (Ultratop Wallonia)	10
Dutch Albums (Album Top 100)	9
European Albums (European Top 100 Albums)	14
French Albums (SNEP)	13
Greek Albums (Music & Media)	9
Norwegian Albums (VG-lista)	40
Portuguese Albums (AFP)	2
Spanish Albums (AFYVE)	1
Swiss Albums (Schweizer Hitparade)	20
UK Albums (Official Charts)ERROR in "UK": Missing parameters: date or album+artist.	32
US Top Latin Albums (Billboard)	3
US Latin Pop Albums (Billboard)	1

=== Year-end charts ===
2000 year-end chart performance for Noche de Cuatro Lunas
Chart (2000)	Rank
Dutch Albums (Album Top 100)	75
European Albums (European Top 100 Albums)	82
Spanish Albums (AFYVE)	5
US Top Latin Albums (Billboard)	44

2001 year-end chart performance for Noche de Cuatro Lunas
Chart (2001)	Position
Spanish Albums (AFYVE)	39

== Certifications ==
Region	Certification	Certified units/sales
Argentina (CAPIF)	Gold	30,000^{^}
France (SNEP)	Gold	100,000^{*}
Mexico (AMPROFON)	Gold	75,000^{^}
Netherlands (NVPI)	Gold	40,000^{^}
Spain (Promusicae)	5× Platinum	500,000^{^}
United States (RIAA)	Platinum (Latin)	100,000^{^}
^{*} Sales figures based on certification alone.^{^} Shipments figures based on certification alone.
