= Tell Me Marianne =

1947 song

Song
- Published: 1947
- Genre: Pop, tango
- Songwriters: Edgardo Donato and Bob Musel
- Lyricist: Carlos César Lenzi (original Spanish text)

"Tell Me Marianne" is a 1947 English lyric adaptation of "A media luz". Originally a 1924 tango by Edgardo Donato which became a standard, the English lyrics and verse melody were written by Bob Musel. It spent a week at number 1 on the British sheet music charts in June 1947.

The melody was also adapted by Dorcas Cochran as "When I Look Into Your Eyes", a 1952 song recorded by Champ Butler.

== Background ==
For the original 1924 version of "A media luz" (translated as "In the Dimmed Light"), the Spanish lyrics were written by Carlos Lenzi; it is considered to be a representative popular tango of that decade. "Tell Me Marianne" was published in 1947, with the sheet music cover describing it as "an adaptation of the world-famous melody 'A media luz'".

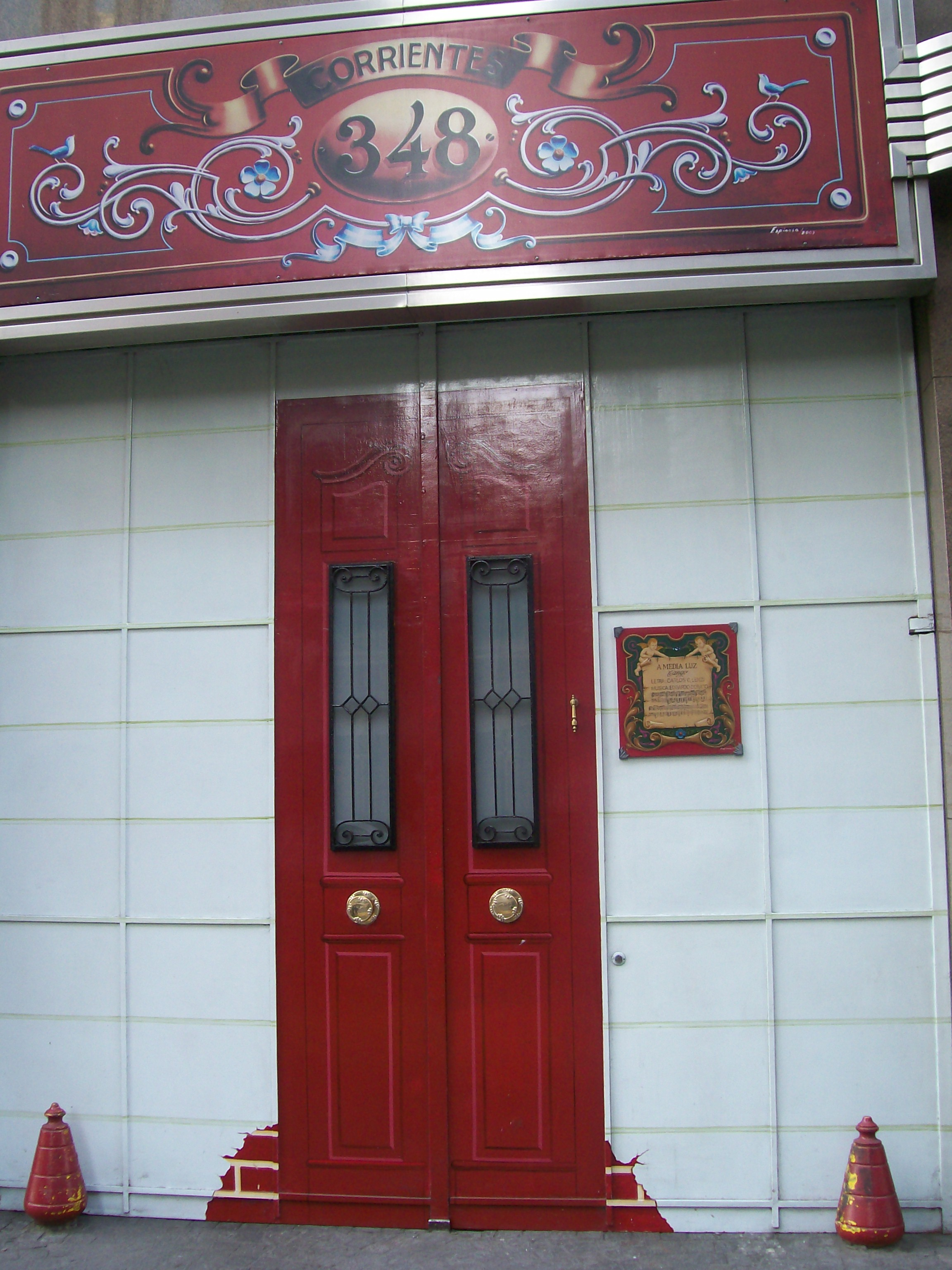
Front of Corrientes 348, in Buenos Aires, which is mentioned in the original song's first line, with a plaque commemorating the song

== Chart performance ==
"Tell Me Marianne" first entered the UK sheet music charts for the week ending 26 April 1947. It dropped out the following week, and re-entered on 10 May, before reaching number 1 for a week on 26 June. It spent a total of 17 weeks on the chart. No recordings of the song entered the US Billboard Best Sellers in Stores chart.

== Recordings ==
When "Tell Me Marianne" first entered the UK sheet music charts in April 1947, two older recordings of "A media luz" were still available, by Victor Silvester and his Ballroom Orchestra (1941) and Stanley Black and his Orchestra (1946). Upon "Tell Me Marianne" reaching the top of the chart in June, there were two versions of "Tell Me Marianne" available, both of which were issued that month. These were by vocalist Monte Rey, and Mantovani and his Orchestra (with vocals by Val Merrall). The following month saw versions released by Joe Loss and his Orchestra (vocals by Don Rivers), and Rita Williams. A non-vocal version by Loss was subsequently issued in 1950. In the early 1950s, Mantovani recorded "A media luz" as an instrumental for An Album of Favourite Tangos. It was released as a single in America in 1953.

A version of the song by Jean Sablon with Toots Camarata and his Orchestra was released in America in September 1948 by RCA Victor.
