= Divorcio =

Studio album by Julio Iglesias
- Released: November 14, 2003
- Genre: Latin pop
- Length: 45:50
- Language: Spanish
- Label: Columbia Records (Sony Music)

Julio Iglesias chronology
Ao Meu Brasil (2001)	Divorcio (2003)	En français... (2005)

Professional ratings
Review scores
Source	Rating
Billboard	Favorable

Divorcio (Divorce) is a studio album by Julio Iglesias. It was released in 2003 on Columbia Records.

== Track listing ==
No.	Title	Writer(s)	Length
1.	"Divorcio"	Julio Iglesias, Rene Toledo	4:00
2.	"Corazon de Papel"	Rafael Ferro, Julio Iglesias, Roberto Livi	3:57
3.	"Criollo Soy"	Julio Iglesias, Rene Toledo	3:56
4.	"Que Ganaste"	Rafael Ferro, Roberto Livi	3:01
5.	"Como Han Pasado los Anos"	Rafael Ferro, Roberto Livi	3:32
6.	"La Carretera II"	Roberto Livi, Rudy Pérez, Julio Iglesias	4:39
7.	"La Ciudad de Madrugada"	Roberto Livi, Rudy Pérez, Julio Iglesias	5:08
8.	"El Bacalao"	Julio Iglesias, Rene Toledo	4:31
9.	"Echame a Mi la Culpa"	Jose Espinoza	3:51
10.	"Esa Mujer"	Julio Iglesias, Roberto Livi, Rudy Pérez	3:04
11.	"Crazy in Love"	Randy McCormick, Even Stevens	3:30
12.	"Extranos Nada Mas (A Man Could Get Killed)"	Bert Kaempfert	2:41
Total length:			45:50

== Charts ==
Chart (2003)	Peak position
Russian Albums (NFPF)	8
US (Billboard Latin Pop Albums)	6
US (Billboard Top Latin Albums)	9

=== Year-end charts ===
Chart (2003)	Peak position
Spain (PROMUSICAE)	17

== Certifications ==
Region	Certification	Certified units/sales
Argentina (CAPIF)	Platinum	40,000^{^}
France (SNEP)	2× Gold	200,000^{*}
Portugal (AFP)	Gold	20,000^{^}
Spain (PROMUSICAE)	2× Platinum	200,000^{^}
^{*} Sales figures based on certification alone.^{^} Shipments figures based on certification alone.
