= Romantic Classics =

Studio album by Julio Iglesias
- Released: 6 June 2006
- Genres: Pop, rock, adult contemporary
- Length: 40:57
- Language: English
- Label: Columbia Records (Sony Music)

Julio Iglesias chronology
L'Homme que je suis (2005)	Romantic Classics (2006)	Quelque chose de France (2007)

Professional ratings
Review scores
Source	Rating
AllMusic	3.5/5 stars

Romantic Classics is a studio album by Julio Iglesias. It was released in 2006 on Columbia Records.

The album contains covers of popular romantic songs of the 1960s, '70s and '80s.

== Track listing ==
No.	Title	Length
1.	"Everybody's Talking"	2:44
2.	"How Can You Mend a Broken Heart?"	3:51
3.	"Careless Whisper"	4:16
4.	"Always on My Mind"	3:43
5.	"Waiting for a Girl Like You"	4:03
6.	"Drive"	3:54
7.	"I Want to Know What Love Is"	4:17
8.	"Right Here Waiting"	4:03
9.	"This Guy's in Love with You"	3:46
10.	"The Most Beautiful Girl"	3:09
11.	"It's Impossible"	3:11
Total length:		40:57

== Charts ==
=== Weekly charts ===
Chart (2006)	Peak position
Australian Albums (ARIA)	42
Austrian Albums (Ö3 Austria)	27
Belgian Albums (Ultratop Flanders)	12
Belgian Albums (Ultratop Wallonia)	9
Danish Albums (Hitlisten)	14
Dutch Albums (Album Top 100)	27
French Albums (SNEP)	21
German Albums (Offizielle Top 100)	75
Irish Albums (IRMA)	26
Italian Albums (FIMI)	75
Norwegian Albums (VG-lista)	9
Portuguese Albums (AFP)	7
Scottish Albums (Official Charts)	43
Spanish Albums (Promusicae)	7
Swiss Albums (Schweizer Hitparade)	57
UK Albums (Official Charts)	42
US Billboard 200	43

=== Year-end charts ===
Chart (2006)	Position
Belgian Albums (Ultratop Wallonia)	78

== Certifications ==
Region	Certification	Certified units/sales
Ireland (IRMA)	Gold	7,500^{^}
Spain (Promusicae)	Gold	40,000^{^}
United Kingdom (BPI)	Silver	60,000^{*}
^{*} Sales figures based on certification alone.^{^} Shipments figures based on certification alone.
