= My Life: The Greatest Hits =

Greatest hits album by Julio Iglesias
- Released: October 6, 1998
- Recorded: 2:25:52
- Genre: Latin pop, pop
- Language: English, Spanish
- Label: Columbia Records

Julio Iglesias chronology
Tango (1998)	My Life: The Greatest Hits (1998)	Mi Vida: Grandes Éxitos (1998)

Professional ratings
Review scores
Source	Rating
AllMusic	4.5/5 stars

My Life: The Greatest Hits is a double-CD greatest hits album by Julio Iglesias, released in 1998 on Columbia Records.

The album contains a special selection of 37 songs Julio Iglesias had recorded over four decades.

My Life is one of the five editions of the album released simultaneously in different languages for different world markets. In addition to the original version in Spanish, the album also saw Portuguese, Italian, and French releases. All editions of the album have some overlap in the track listings due to the inclusion of several tracks in Spanish and English in all the versions.

== Reception ==
Having sold 6,000 copies in the United States in its first week of release, My Life: The Greatest Hits debuted at number 4 in the Billboard Latin 50 (now Billboard Latin Albums) chart on the week of October 24, 1998.

== Track listing ==
=== Disc 1 ===
No.	Title	Writer(s)	Length
1.	"To All the Girls I've Loved Before" (feat. Willie Nelson)	Hal David; Albert Hammond	3:32
2.	"Moralito (La Gota Fría)"	Ramón Arcusa; Emiliano Zuleta	3:33
3.	"All of You" (feat. Diana Ross)	Cole Porter; Tony Renis; Cynthia Weil	4:00
4.	"Crazy"	Willie Nelson	3:15
5.	"My Love" (feat. Stevie Wonder)	Stevie Wonder	5:37
6.	"Can't Help Falling in Love"	Luigi Creatore; Hugo Peretti; George David Weiss	3:20
7.	"Vincent (Starry Starry Night)"	Don McLean	4:19
8.	"When I Need You"	Albert Hammond; Carole Bayer Sager	4:19
9.	"Crazy in Love"	Randy McCormick; Even Stevens	3:34
10.	"Fragile"	Sting	4:18
11.	"When You Tell Me That You Love Me" (feat. Dolly Parton)	John Bettis; Albert Hammond	4:00
12.	"Caruso"	Lucio Dalla	5:49
13.	"Smoke Gets in Your Eyes" (feat. All-4-One)	Otto Harbach; Jerome Kern	3:35
14.	"Summer Wind" (feat. Frank Sinatra)	Hans Bradtke; Henry Mayer; Johnny Mercer	2:31
15.	"Por el Amor de una Mujer"	Danny Daniel; Sonny Marti	3:53
16.	"Moonlight Lady"	Albert Hammond; Carole Bayer Sager	4:04
17.	"My Way (A Mi Manera)" (feat. Paul Anka)	Paul Anka; Claude François; Jacques Revaux; Gilles Thibault	4:24
18.	"Me Va, Me Va"	Ricardo Ceratto; Albert Hammond	5:59

=== Disc 2 ===
No.	Title	Writer(s)	Length
1.	"Un Canto a Galicia"	Julio Iglesias	4:32
2.	"Soy un Truhán, Soy un Señor"	Ramón Arcusa; Manuel de la Calva; Julio Iglesias	3:01
3.	"Hey"	Ramón Arcusa; Mario Balducci; Giovanni Belfiore; Julio Iglesias	4:59
4.	"Où Est Passée Ma Bohème? (Quiéreme Mucho)"	Michael Jourdan; Gonzalo Roig	3:54
5.	"Momentos"	Ramón Arcusa; Julio Iglesias; Tony Renis	3:34
6.	"Amor"	Ricardo Lopez Mendez; Gabriel Ruíz	3:20
7.	"De Niña a Mujer"	Ramón Arcusa; Julio Iglesias; Tony Renis	3:16
8.	"Que Nadie Sepa Mi Sufrir"	Angel Cabral; Cabral Dizeo	3:20
9.	"Volver a Empezar (Begin the Beguine)"	Cole Porter	4:40
10.	"Ae, Ao"	Tony Renis; Massimo Guantini; Rhett Lawrence; Debbie James-Chacon	3:18
11.	"Manuela"	Manuel Alejandro; Ana Magdalena	3:38
12.	"Abrázame"	R. Ferro	3:17
13.	"Milonga Medley: Milonga Sentimental/Vivo"	Ramón Arcusa; Homero Manzi; Sebastián Piana	4:03
14.	"A Media Luz"	Edgardo Donato; Carlos Cesar Lenzi	2:42
15.	"Ni Te Tengo Ni Te Olvido"	Luis Gardey	4:00
16.	"La Carretera"	Rafael Ferro; Roberto Livi	5:06
17.	"Bamboléo"	Tonino Baliardo; Jahloul "Chico" Bouchikhi; S. Diaz; Nicolás Reyes	4:40
18.	"La Cumparsita"	Pascual Contursi; Enrique Pedro Maroni; Gerardo Hernán Matos Rodriguez	2:35
19.	"Agua Dulce, Agua Salá"	Hal Batt; Edgardo Donato; Estéfano	4:24

== Charts ==
Chart (1998)	Peak position
UK (Official Charts Company)	18
US (Billboard Latin Pop Albums)	3
US (Billboard Top Latin Albums)	4

== Certifications ==
Region	Certification	Certified units/sales
Belgium (BRMA)	Gold	
Canada (Music Canada)	Gold	50,000^{^}
Denmark (IFPI Danmark)	Gold	25,000^{^}
Greece (IFPI Greece)	Gold	15,000^{^}
Hong Kong (IFPI Hong Kong)	Gold	10,000^{*}
Indonesia	2× Platinum	
South Africa (RISA)	Gold	25,000^{*}
Taiwan (RIT)	Gold	
United Kingdom (BPI)	Gold	100,000^{^}
United States (RIAA)	2× Platinum (Latin)	200,000^{^}
Summaries
Europe (IFPI)	Platinum	1,000,000^{*}
^{*} Sales figures based on certification alone.^{^} Shipments figures based on certification alone.
