= A Media Luz =

Song written by Edgardo Donato and Carlos César Lenzi

"A media luz"

Song by Carlos Gardel
- B-side: "Chacarerita del norte"
- Released: September 1926
- Recorded: 1926
- Genre: Tango
- Length: 2:13
- Label: Disco Nacional Odeón (18179)
- Composer: Edgardo Donato
- Lyricist: Carlos César Lenzi

Carlos Gardel singles chronology
"Mi mocosita" (1926)	"A media luz" (1926)	"Pa' qué más" (1926)

"A media luz" (transl. "In the Dim Light") is a tango song composed by Edgardo Donato with lyrics by Carlos César Lenzi. Originally produced for an Uruguayan revue, it found success after it was recorded by Carlos Gardel and released on Disco Nacional Odeón in 1926.

As Gardel's release found success, the song was also recorded by other Rioplatense artists and it was often performed in the European tango circuits. Additionally, Donato and Lenzi's composition became one of the most popular tango songs of all time in Argentina and Uruguay. "A media luz" has been recorded by several artists and performed by touring orchestras worldwide, and versions of the song have been featured in diverse films.

== Writing ==
During the 1920s, the Uruguayan and Argentine theater revues included the premiere of novel tango numbers composed specifically for the new productions. Argentine violinist and composer Edgardo Donato was commissioned in 1925 to write a melody for use in the Uruguayan revue Su majestad la revista ("Her majesty the revue"). With Donato's tune already finished, the writing of the lyrics was assigned to Uruguayan play-writer Carlos César Lenzi. "A media luz" debuted on April 3, 1926 with the performance of vedette Lucy Clory at the Albéniz theater in Montevideo, Uruguay.

Two accounts surfaced for the origin of the title. The first suggested that two days before the song premiered, as Donato and the band practiced the unnamed composition at the Mosqués music store in Montevideo, the musicians were bothered by the light of a large chandelier and Donato hinted that they should see how "it comes out with dimmed lights". The second account, by lyricist Francisco García Jiménez, mentioned that as Donato played at a soirée in the residence of the Wilson family of Montevideo, he turned off the main chandelier of the ballroom—which was then illuminated only by the streetlights—and exclaimed, "now with dimmed lights". Lenzi, who was present at the ball, was inspired by Donato's words and wrote the lyrics that night, handing them to Donato the following evening. Lenzi finished the song a month later after refining it and completing of the bri caredge.

In May 1926, Argentine musical publisher Alfredo Perrotti visited Montevideo looking for new tango numbers. Perrotti and Donato were originally introduced by Gerardo Matos Rodríguez, the writer of "La cumparsita". Donato played "A media luz" for the publisher, who believed it would become a hit. Perrotti published the sheet music and returned to Montevideo in July to announce that singer Carlos Gardel would record the song. For the first edition, Donato received 50 m$n. (Note: Then equivalent to around $75, and equivalent to $2,000 in 2025.)

== Release ==
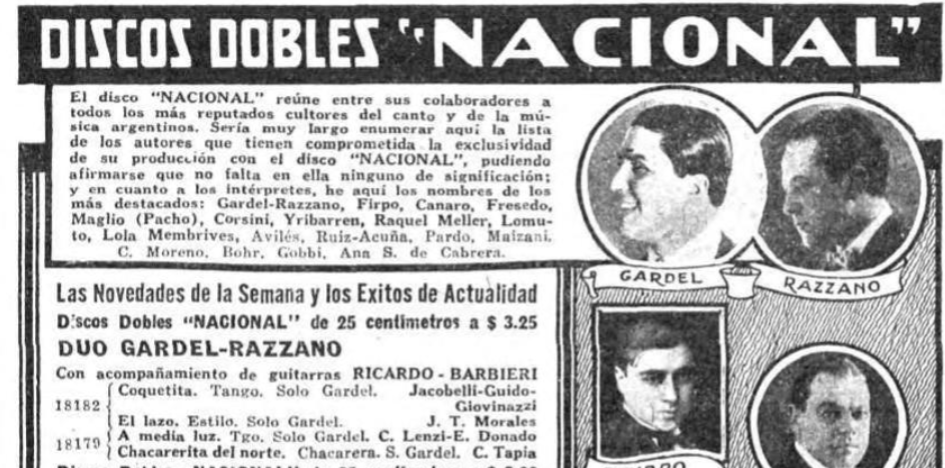
Publicity featuring the release in Caras y Caretas magazine

Gardel's "A media luz" was recorded with the guitar backings by Guillermo Barbieri and José Ricardo, and released by Disco Nacional Odeón in September 1926. The 10-inch format record was assigned the catalog number 18179, and backed with "Chacarerita del norte". The record was pressed by the Argentine Talking Machine Works Buenos Aires for Max Glücksmann with matrix number 18179 A. "A media luz" was among Gardel's acoustically recorded works. It was credited to Gardel as a soloist, who until 1925 was a part of a duo with José Razzano. By September 13, the first edition of the sheet music was sold out and Donato was paid another 50 m$n for the second printing.

In October 1926, singer Azucena Maizani added the number to her revue at the Teatro de la Comedia in Buenos Aires, Argentina. At the time, the Argentine Theater Annuary declared it to be the "most played" and "well-known" tango in Europe. Other early recordings included Francisco Canaro and Rosita Quiroga in 1927. The same year, Odeon released "A media luz" by Gardel backed with "Mi Mocosita" under catalog number 182064 in Spain. By January 1928, the song became popular in Madrid: It was being played by instrumental orchestras, player pianos, in cabaret numbers, teahouses and phonographs. "A media luz" was also soon adopted by French-based orchestras, including Bianco-Bachicha's, Manuel Pizarro's and Genaro Espósito's. The orchestras toured across Europe, reaching as far as Greece and Turkey. Bianco-Bachicha's L'Orchestre Argentin released their version of "A media luz" on Odéon Records. Upon listening to the song in Paris, the cultural attaché of the Japanese embassy in France, Baron Tsunayoshi Megata, took a number of copies to Tokyo to introduce the public to tango music. In 1934, Donato and his orchestra performed "A media luz" in a collaboration program between then-NBC Radio Network's flagship station WEAF and Buenos Aires' Radio Splendid. The program was broadcast in Argentina and syndicated nationally in the United States. Accordionist Koichi Sugii added the tune to his repertory during his time in Argentina, and, upon his return to Tokyo in 1935, performed it often with Kiyoshi Sakurai's orchestra.

=== Personnel ===
All credits are adapted from the label of the record.

- Carlos Gardel – Vocals, guitar
- Guillermo Barbieri – guitar
- José Ricardo – guitar

== Composition ==
The lyrics of the song describe an apartment located on the second floor of 348 Corrientes Avenue in Buenos Aires. Furnished by Maple & Co., it features a piano, roll-up blinds, a light fixture with a lampshade, a phonograph, a phone, chaise longues, throw pillows, and carpeting. The song's narration mentions tango dancing and the drinking of cocktails, as well as sexual encounters and the use of cocaine. Several writers considered the story of "A media luz" to be set in a high-end bordello, though other sources described it rather as a bachelor apartment. Writer José Gobello deemed the composition to be "more lupanarian than erotic".

For the discs released on Odeón Records, the label made the artists substitute the word "victrola" for the more standard "fonola" to avoid publicizing the rival Victor Talking Machine Company. "Juncal 1224" referred to the telephone number of the apartment, in which the word "Juncal" represented the exchange name. At the end of the 1920s, the phone number was in possession of the Gonzalez Bonorino family of Buenos Aires. At the time the song was written, the building at Corrientes 348 hosted a shoe-shine salon within a small shop with a decayed façade. In 1931, the address became a part of the complex of the office building Lipsia, erected by German businessman Curt Berger, owner of the Grafex company. Corrientes 348 is occupied by the underground parking lot of the building, which has the address written in a fileteado style and commemorative plaques for the composition.

== Legacy ==
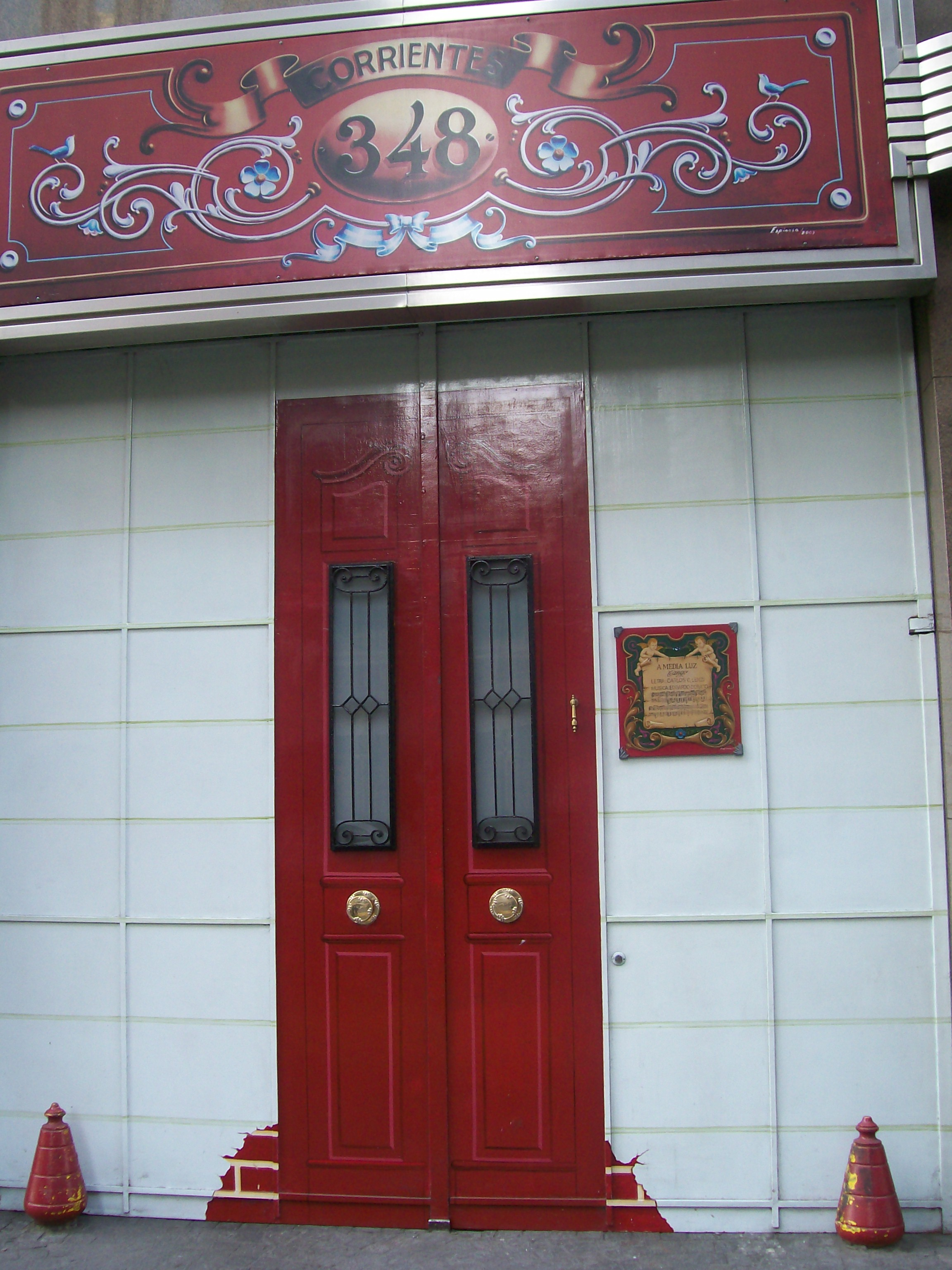
Front of Corrientes 348

As Perrotti did not register "A media luz" for copyright in the United States at the time of its release, which led to the tune being printed and recorded often without credit to the original authors; Perrotti Publishing later considered starting a lawsuit unfeasible. The lyrics were then registered in the United States under Lenzi's name in 1938. "A media luz" was part of Odeon Records' series 54000, a mid-1950s reissue of the acoustic recordings of Gardel between 1917 and 1926. It was paired with "Sueño Marchito" under the catalog number 54043. In 1964, together with "La Cumparsita" and "El Choclo", the Argentine Society of Music Authors and Composers deemed it one of the most popular tango songs. Writer Horacio Ferrer also counted "A media luz" as one of the most popular tangos in Argentina and Uruguay, as well as internationally, adding that the composition had become one of the longest lasting numbers in tango repertoires. As of 2007, the heirs of Donato and Lenzi still received royalties for the composition every four months, and their authorization is required for the use of the tango.

The song was performed by actress Aída Luz in the 1940 film Amor. "A media luz" became the title-track of a 1947 film starring Hugo del Carril, whose singing performance was featured in it. The same year, the lyrics and verse melody of the song were adapted to English as "Tell Me Marianne" by Bob Musel. The sheet music for the song, credited to the Southern Music Publishing Co., topped the Best-selling Sheet Music chart in the United Kingdom in July 1947.

In March 1952, Champ Butler released a pop song to the tune of Donato's composition entitled "When I Look Into Your Eyes". Libertad Lamarque performed "A media luz" in the 1955 film Escuela de música. In 1992, the song was featured in the Martin Brest film Scent of a Woman, starring Al Pacino and Chris O'Donnell. Julio Iglesias released a version of the song, along with a videoclip of his performance, in his 1996 album Tango. In Manuel Vázquez Montalbán's 1997 novel Quinteto de Buenos Aires, protagonist Pepe Carvalho asks to visit Corrientes 348 upon arriving in the city.
