= List of number-one albums of 1998 (Spain) =

The List of number-one albums of 1998 in Spain is derived from the Top 100 España record chart published weekly by PROMUSICAE (Productores de Música de España), a non-profit organization composed by Spain and multinational record companies. This association tracks record sales (physical and digital) in Spain.

== Albums ==
| Week | Chart Date | Album | Artist | Reference |
|---|---|---|---|---|
| 1 | January 5 | Más | Alejandro Sanz | |
| 2 | January 12 | Más | Alejandro Sanz | |
| 3 | January 19 | Más | Alejandro Sanz | |
| 4 | January 26 | Titanic (Soundtrack) | James Horner | |
| 5 | February 2 | Titanic (Soundtrack) | James Horner | |
| 6 | February 9 | Titanic (Soundtrack) | James Horner | |
| 7 | February 16 | Titanic (Soundtrack) | James Horner | |
| 8 | February 23 | Vuelve | Ricky Martin | |
| 9 | March 2 | Ray of Light | Madonna | |
| 10 | March 9 | Titanic (Soundtrack) | James Horner | |
| 11 | March 16 | Titanic (Soundtrack) | James Horner | |
| 12 | March 23 | Ana Jose Nacho | Mecano | |
| 13 | March 30 | Ana Jose Nacho | Mecano | |
| 14 | April 6 | Ana Jose Nacho | Mecano | |
| 15 | April 13 | Ana Jose Nacho | Mecano | |
| 16 | April 20 | Ana Jose Nacho | Mecano | |
| 17 | April 27 | Romances | Luis Miguel | |
| 18 | May 4 | Arena en los Bolsillos | Manolo García | |
| 19 | May 11 | Arena en los Bolsillos | Manolo García | |
| 20 | May 18 | Arena en los Bolsillos | Manolo García | |
| 21 | May 25 | Arena en los Bolsillos | Manolo García | |
| 22 | June 1 | Gloria! | Gloria Estefan | |
| 23 | June 8 | Gloria! | Gloria Estefan | |
| 24 | June 15 | Arena en los Bolsillos | Manolo García | |
| 25 | June 22 | Arena en los Bolsillos | Manolo García | |
| 26 | June 29 | Gloria! | Gloria Estefan | |
| 27 | July 6 | Gloria! | Gloria Estefan | |
| 28 | July 13 | Gloria! | Gloria Estefan | |
| 29 | July 20 | Gloria! | Gloria Estefan | |
| 30 | July 27 | Gloria! | Gloria Estefan | |
| 31 | August 3 | Gloria! | Gloria Estefan | |
| 32 | August 10 | Gloria! | Gloria Estefan | |
| 33 | August 17 | Gloria! | Gloria Estefan | |
| 34 | August 24 | Gloria! | Gloria Estefan | |
| 35 | August 31 | Tubular Bells III | Mike Oldfield | |
| 36 | September 7 | Depende | Jarabe de Palo | |
| 37 | September 14 | Depende | Jarabe de Palo | |
| 38 | September 21 | Sombras de la China | Joan Manuel Serrat | |
| 39 | September 28 | Mi Vida. Grandes Éxitos | Julio Iglesias | |
| 40 | October 5 | Mi Vida. Grandes Éxitos | Julio Iglesias | |
| 41 | October 12 | Mi Vida. Grandes Éxitos | Julio Iglesias | |
| 42 | October 19 | Mi Vida. Grandes Éxitos | Julio Iglesias | |
| 43 | October 26 | Luna nueva | Rosana | |
| 44 | November 2 | Luna nueva | Rosana | |
| 45 | November 9 | Luna nueva | Rosana | |
| 46 | November 16 | Luna nueva | Rosana | |
| 47 | November 23 | Luna nueva | Rosana | |
| 48 | November 30 | The Best of 1980–1990 | U2 | |
| 49 | December 7 | Luna nueva | Rosana | |
| 50 | December 14 | Luna nueva | Rosana | |
| 51 | December 21 | Luna nueva | Rosana | |
| 52 | December 28 | Luna nueva | Rosana | |

== See also ==
- List of number-one singles of 1998 (Spain)
