= Band of Gold (Don Cherry song) =

Single by Don Cherry
- B-side: "Rumble Boogie"
- Released: 1955
- Genre: Traditional pop
- Length: 2:32
- Label: Columbia
- Composer: Jack Taylor
- Lyricist: Bob Musel

"Band of Gold" is a traditional pop song, with music by Jack Taylor and lyrics by Bob Musel. It was published in 1955.

The biggest hit version was recorded by Don Cherry with Ray Conniff's orchestra in 1955. This version reached number 5 on the pop chart in the United States. Another recording was done in 1955 by singer Kit Carson (born Liza Morrow) that reached number 17 on the Top 100, and there was also a British cover by Petula Clark.

Cherry re-recorded the song for his album, There Goes My Everything, in 1968.

Singer Mel Carter recorded the song in two different versions, once in 1965 and again in 1966. The latter version peaked at number 32 on the Billboard Hot 100 chart and went to number one on the Easy Listening chart, where it remained for two weeks in May 1966.

== In popular culture ==
- Don Cherry's recording of "Band of Gold" was the first song played after the opening credits in the first episode of the first season of AMC's Emmy-winning television series Mad Men, and also appears in Mad Men's sixth season finale.
- Cherry's recording is also among the pop and rock hits sampled in the early break-in comedy rock hit "The Flying Saucer (Parts 1 & 2)" by Buchanan & Goodman in 1956.

== See also ==
- List of number-one adult contemporary singles of 1966 (U.S.)
