= María Luisa Carnelli =

Argentine writer, poet, and journalist

María Luisa Carnelli (31 January 1898 - Buenos Aires, 4 May 1987) was an Argentine writer, poet, and journalist. Carnelli was known for her tango lyrics.

Carnelli was born in La Plata on 31 January 1898, a half block from the Paseo del Bosque city park. She was one of ten children of Julia Serna and Enrique Carnelli. Her brothers listened to tango, but secretly as the parents opposed it. Carnelli adopted a leftist ideology. She married very young, had a son, but soon separated from her husband. She settled in Buenos Aires and earned a living as a journalist. Her articles were published in newspapers and magazines of the time: Crítica, Noticias Gráficas, Clarín, La Nación, El Hogar, Caras y Caretas, Fray Mocho, Atlántida, as well as others. She published her first book of poetry, Versos de mujer, in 1922 at the age of 24, and two years later, published a second on, Rama frágil.

== See also ==
- Lists of writers
