= Allison Durbin =

- Born: Allison Ann Durbin; 24 May 1950 (age 76); Auckland, New Zealand
- Occupation: Singer

Allison Ann Giles, who performed as Allison Durbin (born 24 May 1950), is a former New Zealand Australian singer, known for her success in the late 1960s and 1970s as a teen idol.

== Biography ==
Allison Ann Durbin was born in 1950 in Auckland to Owen Durbin (born c. 1912/1913) and Agnes Durbin, the second eldest of seven children. She attended school at Westlake High School, and performed for four years in a children's choir. She became interested in singing and was inspired by artists like Aretha Franklin, Nina Simone and Dionne Warwick, and began performing in public in her early teens.

After winning a talent contest at an Auckland ballroom, she was signed to Eldred Stebbing's Zodiac Records at the age of 14 and issued a number of singles. Her third Zodiac single, a cover of Herman's Hermits "Can't You Hear My Heartbeat", out-sold the original in New Zealand and became her first charted hit. She built up a following in New Zealand, recording and fronting the Mike Perjanik Group and travelled with them to Australia in 1966 for residencies in Sydney. After nine months in Sydney, she left the group to pursue a solo career, making numerous appearances on Australian TV pop and variety shows.

Durbin's first single for His Master's Voice, "I Have Loved Me a Man", (a cover version of the song by Morgana King) became a No. 1 hit in New Zealand and also a hit in Australia. The song won her a New Zealand music award, 1968 Loxene Golden Disc, and she was named New Zealand Entertainer of the Year in 1969. For three years running (1969, 1970 and 1971), she won Australia's King of Pop Award for "Best Female Artist", commonly called the "Queen of Pop". In 1971, she recorded a duet album, Together, with Johnny Farnham, who had been voted Australia's "King of Pop" during the same years Durbin received her awards.

== Personal life ==
In the late 1960s, Durbin began a relationship with expatriate New Zealand record producer Howard Gable, then a senior A&R manager and in-house producer for EMI Australia. They married in 1969 and started a family. During the 1970s, as her career waned, Durbin began using heroin and her marriage to Gable ended. In 1985, she publicly acknowledged her battle with drugs and sought treatment at Odyssey House, a drug rehabilitation centre, but she was struck by a car two days after leaving the centre, which left her with serious injuries, including a broken jaw. After she recovered, she worked as a country music singer in the late 1980s. In 1986, she married for a second time to Ray Giles.

On 1 June 2007, under her married name Allison Giles, she was sentenced to 12 months' jail for cannabis trafficking. One of her co-accused, Giuseppe "Joe" Barbaro, whom she allegedly supplied with marijuana was a previously convicted drug dealer.

She is a relative of Canadian-born actress and lyric soprano Deanna Durbin.

== Television ==
Year	Title	Performance	Type
1969–1970	In Melbourne Tonight	Singer	7 episodes
1969; 1970	The Mike Walsh Show	Singer	2 episodes
1970	Bandstand	Singer	1 episode
1970	1970 TV Week Logie Awards	Singer ("I Have Loved Me a Man" / "River Deep – Mountain High")	TV special
1970	Happening '70	Singer	
1971	Happening '71	Singer ("Holy Man" / "A Man and a Woman" / "Baby Without You" with John Farnham)	3 episodes
1971	Uptight	Singer	1 episode
1971	Young Talent Time	Singer	1 episode
1972	The Graham Kennedy Show	Singer ("Amerikan Music")	1 episode
1972	Happening '72	Singer ("Amerikan Music")	1 episode
1973	Australian Popular Song Festival 1973	Singer	TV special
1974–1975	The Ernie Sigley Show	Singer	9 episodes
1977	Telethon '77	Singer	TV special
1980; 1982	The Don Lane Show	Singer	2 episodes
1980; 1983	The Mike Walsh Show	Singer	2 episodes
1984	Tonight with Bert Newton	Singer ("I Love a Rainy Night")	1 episode
1992	Hey Hey It's Saturday	Singer ("Put Your Hand in the Hand" / "Can't Get Over You")	2 episodes
1994–1995	Good Morning Australia	Singer ( "Bright Eyes" / "Crazy" / "River Deep – Mountain High")	3 episodes
2003	Love is in the Air	Herself	Episode 2: "She's Leaving Home"

== Discography ==
=== Studio albums ===
List of albums, with Australian chart positions
Title	Album details	Peak chart positions
Title	Album details	AUS
I Have Loved Me a Man	Released: 1968; Format: LP; Label: His Master's Voice	-
Soft and Soulful	Released: 1969; Format: LP; Label: His Master's Voice	-
Together (with Johnny Farnham)	Released: August 1971; Format: LP; Label: His Master's Voice (OCSD 7682)	22
Amerikan Music	Released: 1972; Format: LP; Label: His Master's Voice	-
Born a Woman	Released: November 1976; Format: LP; Label: Hammard (HAM011)	75
Are You Lonesome Tonight	Released: June 1977; Format: LP; Label: Hammard (HAM017)	52
Three Times a Lady	Released: 1978; Format: LP; Label: Hammard	-
Bright Eyes	Released: 1979; Format: LP; Label: Hammard (HAM043)	34
Shining Star	Released: 1980; Format: LP; Label: Hammard (HAM055)	43
My Kind of Country	Released: November 1981; Format: LP; Label: Hammard (HAM063)	97
Nothing But the Very Best (with Diana Trask)	Released: August 1982; Format: LP; Label: Hammard (HAMD075)	88
Country Love Songs	Released: September 1983; Format: LP; Label: Hammard (HAM089)	79
Reckless Girl	Released: 1992; Format: CD; Label:	-

=== Charting singles ===
List of singles, with Australian chart positions
Year	Title	Peak chart positions
Year	Title	AUS
1968	"Don't Come Any Closer"	47
1968	"I Have Loved Me a Man"	27
1969	"Games People Play"	29
1969	"He's Bad Bad Bad"	98
1970	"Golden Days"	98
1971	"Put Your Hand in the Hand"	24
1971	"Baby, Without You" (with Johnny Farnham)	27
1972	"Amerikan Music"	33

== Awards and nominations ==
Year	Award	Category	Work	Result
1968	New Zealand Music Awards	Most Promising Female	"I Have Loved Me a Man"	Won
1969	The Go-Set Pop Poll by Go-Set	Best Female Vocal		1st
1969	TV Week The King of Pop Awards	Best Female Artist		Won
1970	The Go-Set Pop Poll by Go-Set	Best Girl		1st
1970	TV Week The King of Pop Awards	Best Female Artist		Won
1971	The Go-Set Pop Poll by Go-Set	Best Girl Vocal		1st
1971	TV Week The King of Pop Awards	Best Female Artist		Won
1972	The Go-Set Pop Poll by Go-Set	Best Female Vocal		2nd
1972	TV Week The King of Pop Awards	Best Dressed Female Performer		Won
1979	Mo Awards	Country Female Entertainer of the Year		Won
1980	Mo Awards	Country Female of the Year		Won

- Note: Durbin is often referred to as the 'Queen of Pop', but won Best Female Artist at the King of Pop Awards from 1969 to 1971. The Queen of Pop award was introduced in 1972. In 2003, Durbin reiterated this saying, "I never in fact won a queen of pop award. The award was called The King of Pop Awards.
