= Agua Dulce, Agua Salá =

1995 song by Julio Iglesias

Single by Julio Iglesias

from the album La Carretera
- Released: 1995
- Recorded: April 1995
- Genre: Rumba flamenca
- Length: 4:24
- Label: Sony Discos
- Songwriters: Estéfano; Donato Poveda; Hal Batt
- Producer: Ramón Arcusa

Julio Iglesias singles chronology
"When You Tell Me That You Love Me" (1994)	"Agua Dulce, Agua Salá" (1995)	"Baila Morena" (1995)

"Agua Dulce, Agua Salá" ("Sweet Water, Salt Water") is a song from Spanish singer Julio Iglesias's studio album La Carretera (1995). The song was written by Estéfano, Donato Poveda, and Hal Batt and produced by Ramón Arcusa. It was released as the lead single from the album in 1995. A rumba flamenca, the song deals with the theme of life. The song received positive reactions from music critics, mostly being found catchy by them. It was a recipient of the ASCAP Latin Award in 1996. Commercially, the song peaked at number three on the Hot Latin Songs chart and number one on the Latin Pop Airplay chart in the United States. A music video for the song was filmed in Spain and features Fabiola Martinez. Iglesias also recorded it in Portuguese as "Água Doce, Água do Mar" for his studio album Ao Meu Brasil (2000).

== Background and composition ==
In 1995, Iglesias released La Carretera, his first Spanish-language album since Calor (1992). To promote the album, "Agua Dulce, Agua Salá" was released as its lead single in 1995. The song was later included on Iglesias' compilation album My Life: The Greatest Hits (1998). The song was written by Estéfano, Donato Poveda, and Hal Batt while produced by Ramón Arcusa. The track was recorded in Miami during April 1995. Musically, "Agua Dulce, Agua Salá" is a rumba flamenca and describes the theme of life, to accept its bitterness and pleasure and to keep on dancing. Colombian vallenato musician Egidio Cuadrado, who is a member of Carlos Vives' band, plays the accordion for the song. The track is also accompanied by hand claps and "jubilant" background singers as well as percussions.

== Promotion and reception ==
The music video for "Agua Dulce, Agua Salá" was filmed at the Hermitage of El Rocío in Huelva, Spain and features Venezuelan model Fabiola Martinez. Iglesias performed the song live on the Mexican variety show Siempre en Domingo in 1995. A Portuguese-language version of the song was recorded by Iglesias under the title of "Água Doce, Água do Mar", which was included on his studio album Ao Meu Brasil (2000). "Agua Dulce, Agua Salá" has been covered by Dominican Republic singer Alex Bueno on his studio album Me Equivoque (1996).

The Miami Herald critic Howard Cohen called "Agua Dulce, Agua Salá" an "intoxicating samba" and felt it has "an infectious tropical flavor". Charlotte Aiken of The Oklahoman praised the song as "sassy", while the El Paso Times editor Maria Cortés Gonazlez complimented the track as one of the album's "infectiously dance tunes". A writer for Music & Media referred to it as a "percussive single". The track was recognized as one of the best-performing songs of the year at the 1996 ASCAP Latin Awards. In the United States, "Agua Dulce, Agua Salá" peaked at number three on the Billboard Hot Latin Songs chart and reached the top of the Latin Pop Airplay chart. It was also recognized at the 1997 BMI Latin Awards.It was recognized as on the best-performing songs of the year at the 1997 BMI Awards.

== Formats and track listings ==
Promotional single

1. Agua Dulce, Agua Sala – 4:24
2. Vuela Alto – 3:11
3. Guajira/Oye Como Va – 3:54

Remixes by Jellybean

A1. Agua Dulce, Agua Salá (Ay, Ay, Ay,Ay) (Underground Version #1) – 5:45
A2. Agua Dulce, Agua Salá (Ay, Ay, Ay,Ay) (Underground Version #2) – 5:45
B1. Agua Dulce, Agua Salá (Ay, Ay, Ay,Ay) (Radio Edit 12 Extended Version) – 5:50
B2 Agua Dulce, Agua Salá (Ay, Ay, Ay,Ay) (Radio Edit 12 Main Version) – 4:40

== Charts ==
=== Weekly charts ===
Chart performance for "Agua Dulce, Agua Salá"
Chart (1995)	Peak position
Netherlands (Dutch Top 40 Tipparade)	6
Netherlands (Dutch Single Tip)	9
US Hot Latin Songs (Billboard)	3
US Latin Pop Airplay (Billboard)	1

=== Year-end charts ===
1995 year-end chart performance for "Agua Dulce, Agua Salá"
Chart (1995)	Position
US Hot Latin Songs (Billboard)	33

== See also ==
- List of Billboard Latin Pop Airplay number ones of 1994 and 1995
