= Que c'est triste Venise =

Song by Charles Aznavour

from the EP Que C'est Triste Venise
- English title: How Sad Venice Is
- Released: 1964
- Length: 2:36
- Label: Barclay
- Songwriters: Charles Aznavour; Françoise Dorin

"Que c'est triste Venise" (literal English translation: "How Sad Venice Is") is a song written by Armenian-French artist Charles Aznavour and Françoise Dorin and sung by Aznavour about Venice. It was first recorded in French by Aznavour in 1964, and later in Spanish ("Venecia sin ti"), German ("Venedig im Grau"), English ("How Sad Venice Can Be" or "Venice Blue" cover of Bobby Darin), and most notably in 1971 in Italian ("Com'è triste Venezia").

In 1964–1965 it was on Top Hit charts of Billboard (France, Rio de Janeiro, Brazil, etc.) and was an international hit.

Italian poet Giulia Niccolai dedicated her Com'è triste Venezia love poem (titled after the song) to Charles Aznavour and to Adriano Spatola.

== Awards ==
In 1964 it received a Blason d'Or award as one of the top hits of the year.

== Charts ==
Chart (1964–65)	Peak position
Argentina (CAPIF)	1
Belgium (Ultratop 50 Wallonia)	4
Brazil (ABPD)	8
France (SNEP)	4
