= Robert Musel =

American journalist and lyricist (1909–1999)

Robert Saul Musel (13 August 1909 – 8 September 1999), sometimes credited as Bob Musel, was an American journalist and lyricist, who was based in London for much of his life. As well as covering European stories for the United Press news agency for several decades, becoming "celebrated in his profession for the quality of his writing and the breadth of his experience," he wrote the lyrics to several successful popular songs.

== Biography ==
Born in New York City, he joined United Press at the age of 15, and worked for the company for 58 years. In his early years he covered stories on Broadway, and in 1927, when based in Trenton, New Jersey, he covered the kidnapping and death of Charles Lindbergh's son. Musel claimed to have been the inspiration for a character in the play Hold the Front Page by Ben Hecht. Musel also worked for a while as a scriptwriter in Hollywood.

During World War II he was assigned to the US Ninth Air Force, and stayed in London after the end of the war as the office's senior editor. In 1947, "Tell Me Marianne", Musel's adaptation of the 1924 tango "A media luz", topped the UK sheet music charts. He reported on the coronation of Queen Elizabeth II, writing: "Golden trumpets stilled the tumult of modern London today, and the world's largest city rolled back the centuries to hear Elizabeth II proclaimed Queen."

In 1953, he became a consultant to Broadcast Music, Inc. (BMI) in London. Having started writing song lyrics while in his teens, he wrote the words for a number of popular songs, including "Poppa Piccolino", originally an Italian song which became a no.2 pop hit in the UK for Diana Decker in 1953, and "Band of Gold", an international chart hit for Don Cherry in 1956. Reportedly, he coined the nickname "Elvis the Pelvis" for Elvis Presley. In 1993, BMI established an annual award in his name for the year's most-performed song, and he remained a consultant to the organisation until his death.

He died in London of cancer at the age of 90, after having suffered a stroke several years previously.
