= Tempo Latino =

Festival of salsa and Latin music in Vic-Fezensac, France

Coordinates: 43.7594°N 0.3042°E

Tempo Latino is a festival of salsa music and Latin music in Vic-Fezensac, France (at the end of July).

== Artists invited ==
=== 2008 ===
- 24/7 :
  - / Ska Cubano (website: SkaCubano.com)
  - / Roy Paci & Aretuska
- 25/7:
  - Yerba Buena
  - Latin Giants of Jazz (website: LatinGiants.com) :
- 26/7 :
  - / Los Patriarcas de la Rumba(website: PatriarcasDeLaRumba.com)
  - La 33
- 27/07 :
  - Dave Valentin's Tropics Heat
  - Larry Harlow and Latin Legends of Fania

=== 2007 ===
- 26/07 :
  - Kékélé (Republic of Congo)
  - Los Van Van (~~Yerba Buena~~ canceled)
- 27/07 :
  - Maraca. Guests : Candido Fabre & Tiburon
  - Israel Lopez Cachao (Cuba/Miami)
- 28/07 :
  - Son Reinas (Japan)
  - Yomo Toro (Puerto Rico)
- 29/07 :
  - Africando (Senegal, ...)
  - Willie Colón (Spanish Harlem)
- 30/07 :
  - Manu Chao

=== 2006 ===
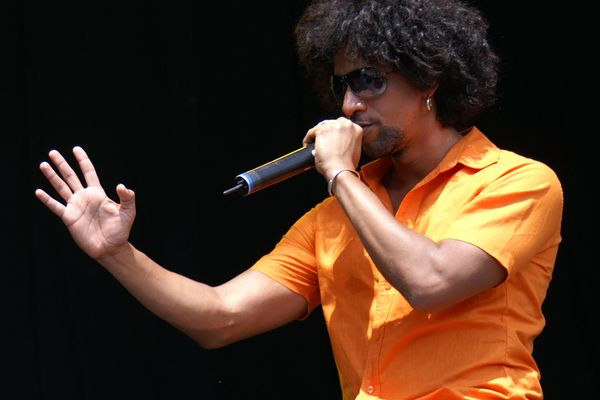
Free Hole Negro

- 27/07 : 21 h 00
  - Free Hole Negro (Cuba)
  - Sergent Garcia (France - Cuba)
- 28/07 : 21 h 30 Special Porto Rico
  - Son Boricua with Jose Mangual Jr & Jimmy Sabater (photos)
  - Cheo Feliciano y Mercadonegro (photos)
- Samedi 29 juillet : 21 h 30 Special Porto Rico
  - Son del Barrio ~~Plena Libre (annulé)~~ (photos)
  - Bobby Valentín y su Orquesta (photos)
- 30/07 : 21 h 30
  - La Charanga Contradanza (Toulouse) (photos)
  - Oscar D'León (Venezuela) (photos)(video)

=== 2005 ===
- La Banda Municipal de Santiago photos - article sur le groupe
- Raul Paz photos
- Grupo Caribe photos 1, photos 2, commentaires
- Big 3 Palladium Orchestra : Tito Puente JR(Tito Puente's son, Machito JR (fils de Machito) & Tito Rodríguez JR (Tito Rodríguez's son) photos 1, photos 2
- Mangu photos
- Johnny Pacheco with Ismaël Miranda & Hector Casanova photos 1, photos 2, commentaires
- Son Reinas (Japan) Photos 1, photos 2, Video 1
- Orchestra de la Luz (Japan) photos 1, photos 2

Photo Gallery

=== 2004 ===
- Olga Guillot "la Reina del Bolero" photos
- Israël Lopez "Cachao" "El Maestro del Mambo"
- Fruko photos
- Yuri Buenaventura photos
- Manny Oquendo
- Spanish Harlem Orchestra photos
- Los Soneros del Barrio photos
- Yerba Buena photos
- Amparanoïa photos

=== 2003 ===
- Macaco photos
- Orishas photos
- Maraca photos & Afro Cuban Jazz Master, Featuring: Tata Güines - Giovanni Hidalgo et Changuito
- Cubanismo photos
- Plena Libre
- Richie Ray & Samuel Prieto
- Jimmy Bosch photos
- Oscar D'Léon photos
- Grupo Caribe photos
- Tempo Latino 2003 photos

=== 2002 ===
- Omara Portuondo
- Orlando Lopez "Cachaito" Guest : Anga Diaz
- Maraca
- José Alberto "El Canario"
- Manolito y su Trabuco
- Africando

=== 2001 ===
- El Conjunto
- Chapottin y su Estellas
- The New Salsa All Stars, guests : Alfredo de la Fé, Jimmy Bosch, Giovanni Hidalgo, Dave Valentin & José Alberto "El Canario".
- Grupo Caribe
- El Gran Combo de Puerto Rico
- Omar Sosa

=== 2000 ===
- William Cepeda
- La Sonora Ponceña
- Yuri Buenaventura
- Jimmy Bosch
- Orishas
- Sergent Garcia

=== 1999 ===
- Eddie Palmieri Orchestra, Guest : Alfredo de la Fé
- Israel Lopez "Cachao"
- Raul Paz
- Maraca y Otra Vision
- Jimmy Bosch
- Willie Colón
- Camilo Azuquita
- Amparanoïa
- La Banda Municipal de Santiago

=== 1998 ===
- La Orquesta Aragón
- Manny Oquendo & Libre
- Ernesto Tito Puentes
- Afro Cuban All Stars
- Oscar D'León
- Celia Cruz
- Mambomania

=== 1997 ===
- Yuri Buenaventura
- Adalberto Álvarez
- A. Rodriguez
- Los Van Van
- Orlando Poleo
- Oscar D'León
- La Familia Valera Miranda
- Raul Paz

=== 1996 ===
- Yanza
- Jóvenes Clásicos del Son
- Oscar D'León
- NG La Banda
- Compay Segundo
- Orlando Poleo
- La Familia Valera Miranda
- Hidegar Maracay Salsa

=== 1995 ===
- Latin Groove
- Camilo Azuquita
- NG La Banda
- Papo Lucca y la Sonora Poncena

=== 1994 ===
- Macaco
- Orishas
- Maraca et Afro Cuban Jazz Master featuring: Tata Güines, Giovanni Hidalgo et Changuito
- Cubanismo
- Plena Libre
- Richie Ray & Samuel Prieto
- Jimmy Bosch
- Oscar D'Léon
- Yuri Buenaventura

== Official Site ==
http://www.tempo-latino.com
