= Salsa (musical structure) =

Musical structure of salsa

The musical structure of Salsa (music) is composed of several components and sections.

== Verse and chorus sections ==
Most salsa compositions follow the basic son montuno model of a verse section, followed by a coro-pregón (call-and-response) chorus section known as the montuno. The verse section can be short, or expanded to feature the lead vocalist and/or carefully crafted melodies with clever rhythmic devices. Once the montuno section begins, it usually continues until the end of the song. The tempo may gradually increase during the montuno in order to build excitement. The montuno section can be divided into various sub-sections sometimes referred to as mambo, diablo, moña, and especial.

== Clave ==
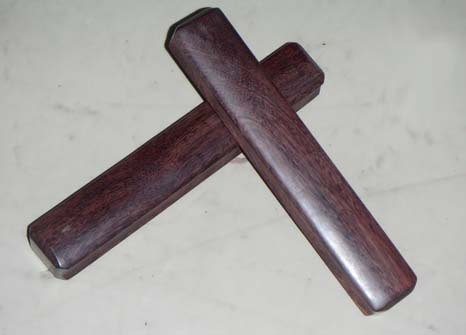
Pair of claves.

The most fundamental rhythmic element in salsa music is a pattern and concept known as clave. Clave is a Spanish word meaning 'code,' 'key,' as in key to a mystery or puzzle, or 'keystone,' the wedge-shaped stone in the center of an arch that ties the other stones together. Clave is also the name of the patterns played on claves; two hardwood sticks used in Afro-Cuban music ensembles. The five-stroke clave represents the structural core of many Afro-Cuban rhythms, both popular and folkloric. Just as a keystone holds an arch in place, the clave pattern holds the rhythm together. The clave patterns originated in sub-Saharan African music traditions, where they serve the same function as they do in salsa.

The two most common five-stroke African bell parts, which are also the two main clave patterns used in Afro-Cuban music, are known to salsa musicians as son clave and rumba clave. Son and rumba clave can be played in either a triple-pulse (12/8 or 6/8) or duple-pulse (4/4, 2/4 or 2/2) structure. Salsa uses duple-pulse son clave almost exclusively.

The contemporary Cuban practice is to write clave in a single measure of 4/4. Clave is written in this way in the following example in order to illustrate the underlying metric structure of four main beats, which is fundamental to the dynamism of the pattern.

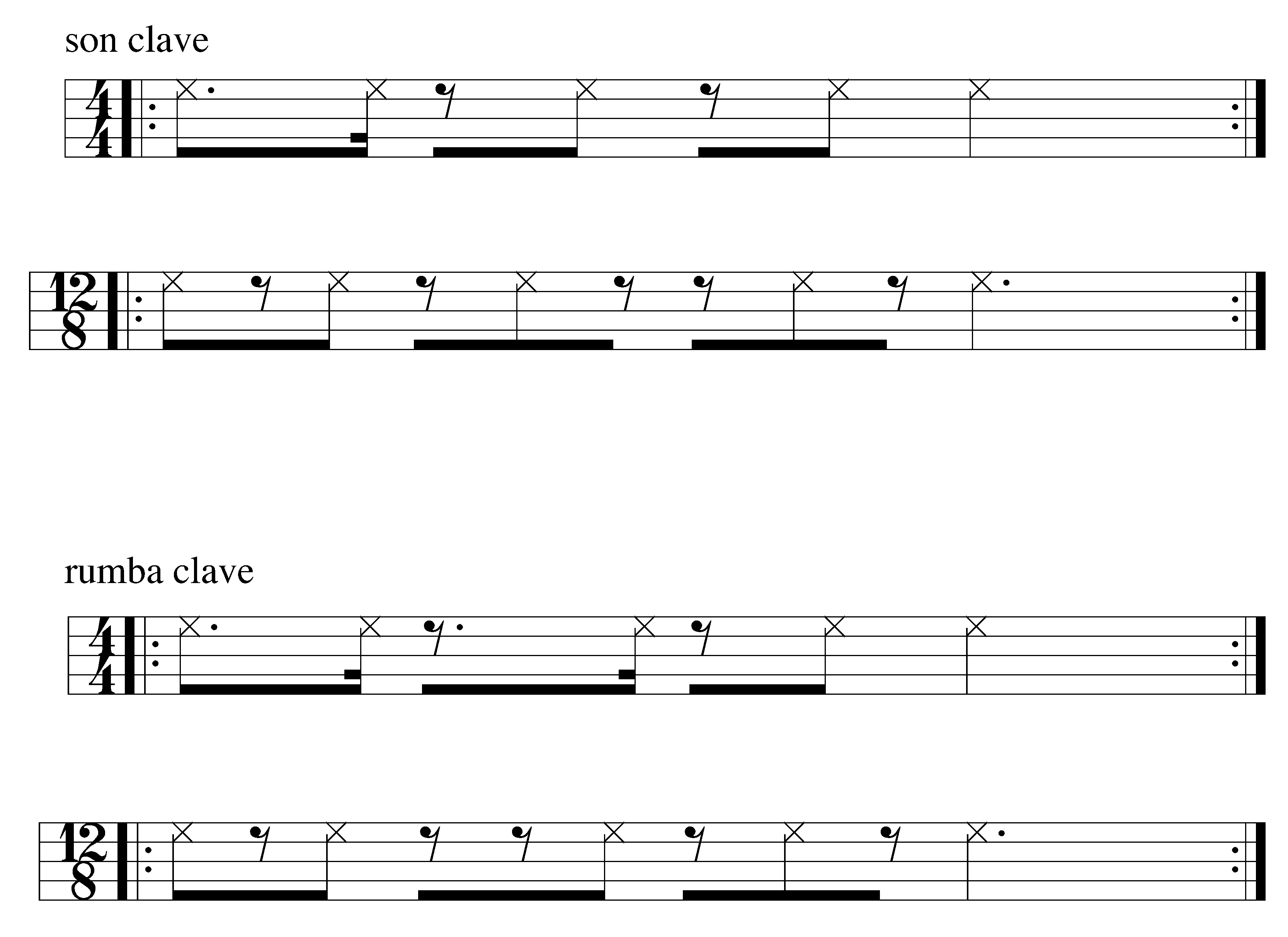
Son and rumba clave in simple meter (duple-pulse) and compound meter (triple-pulse) variants.,,,

Concerning the role of clave in salsa music, Charley Gerard states: "The clave feeling is in the music whether or not the claves are actually being played." Every ostinato part which spans a cycle of four main beats, has a specific alignment with clave, and expresses the rhythmic qualities of clave either explicitly or implicitly. Every salsa musician must know how their particular part fits with clave, and with the other parts of the ensemble.

The basic conga tumbao, or marcha sounds slaps (triangle noteheads) and open tones (regular noteheads) on the "and" offbeats. The single tone coinciding with the third stroke of clave is known as ponche, an important syncopated accent. The specific alignment between clave and the conga is critical.

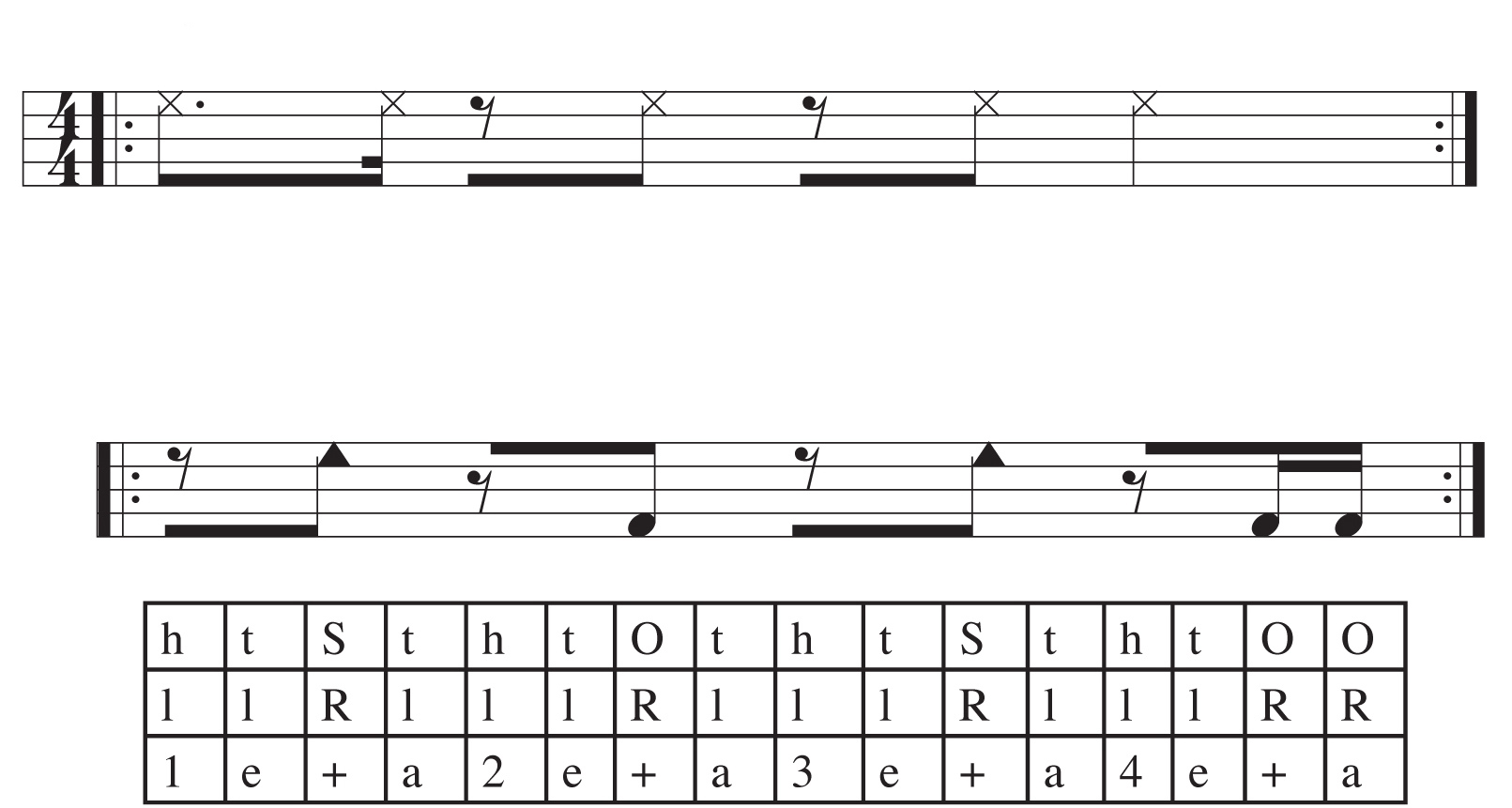
Top: clave. Bottom: basic conga tumbao on one drum. S: slap, O: open tone, h: palm heel, t: finger tips.

The concept of clave as a form of music theory with its accompanying terminology, was fully developed during the big band era of the 1940s, when dance bands in Havana and New York City were enlarged. By the time salsa emerged in the 1970s, there was already a second generation of clave savvy composers and arrangers working in New York. John Santos stresses the importance of this skill:

One of the most difficult applications of the clave is in the realm of composition and arrangement of Cuban and Cuban-based dance music. Regardless of the instrumentation, the music for all of the instruments of the ensemble must be written with a very keen and conscious rhythmic relationship to the clave ... Any 'breaks' and/or 'stops' in the arrangements must also be 'in clave'. If these procedures are not properly taken into consideration, then the music is 'out of clave' which, if not done intentionally, is considered an error. When the rhythm and music are 'in clave,' a great natural 'swing' is produced, regardless of the tempo. All musicians who write and/or interpret Cuban-based music must be 'clave conscious,' not just the percussionists.

Salsa is a potent expression of clave, and clave became a rhythmic symbol of the musical movement, as its popularity spread. Clave awareness within the salsa community has served as a cultural "boundary marker", creating an insider/outsider dichotomy, between Cuban and non-Cuban, and between Latino and non-Latino. At the same time though, clave serves its ancient function of providing a means of profound inclusion. As Washburne observes:

Clapping clave at a concert in sync with the performing musicians provides for a group participation in music-making even for a novice. However, the messages transmitted can be, and often are, imbued with more meaning than simply, 'Let's all participate!' A newcomer to salsa, whether performer, dancer, listener, or consumer, must acquire some level of clave competence before engaging in these 'clave dialogues' in a deeper, more significant way.

Before salsa pianist Eddie Palmieri takes his first solo at a live concert, he will often stand up, and start clapping clave. Once the audience is clapping clave along with him, Palmieri will sit back down at the piano and proceed to take his solo. Palmieri's solos tend to be rhythmically complex, with avant-garde elements such as harmonic dissonance. By clapping clave along with Palmieri's solo, the audience is able to both "de-code" its rather esoteric musical "message", and participate in its creation at a fundamental level.

Clave is the basic period, composed of two rhythmically opposed cells, one antecedent and the other consequent. Clave was initially written in two measures of 2/4 (below). When clave is written in two measures, each cell or clave half is represented within a single measure. The antecedent half has three strokes and is referred to as the three-side of clave in the parlance of salsa. In Cuban popular music, the first three strokes of son clave are also known collectively as tresillo, a Spanish word meaning 'triplet' (three equal beats in the same time as two main beats). However, in the Cuban vernacular, the term refers to the figure shown below in the first measure. The consequent half (second measure) of clave has two strokes and is called the two-side by salsa musicians.

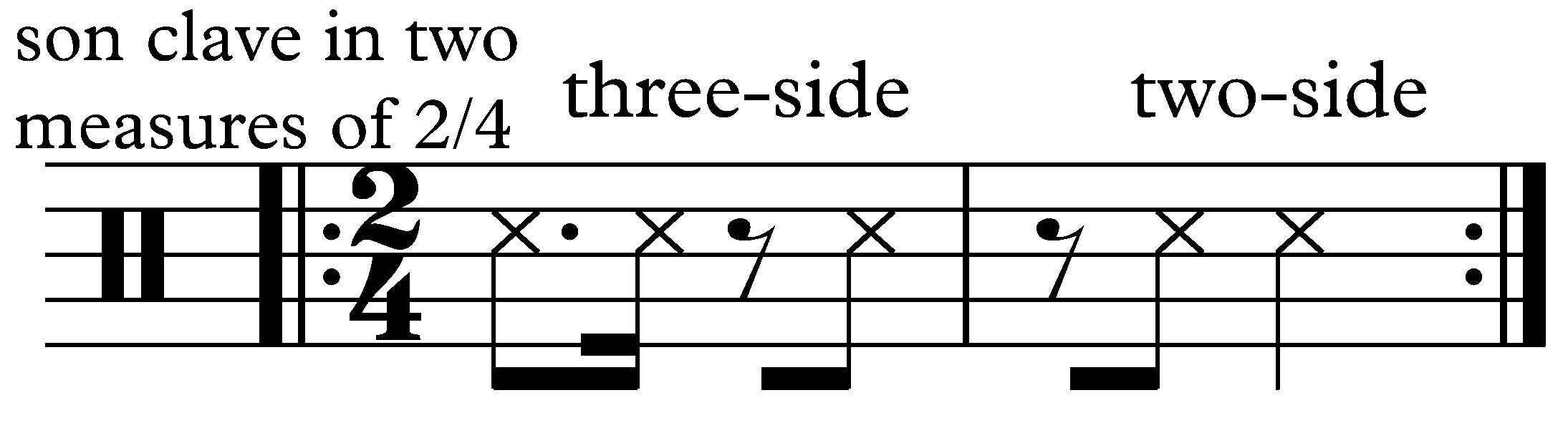
Clave has a binary structure.

The first measure of clave is considered "strong", contradicting the meter with three cross beats and generating a sense of forward momentum. The second measure is considered "weak". Clave resolves in the second measure when the last stroke coincides with the last main beat of the cycle. John Amria describes the rhythmic sequence of clave:

[With] clave ... the two measures are not at odds, but rather, they are balanced opposites like positive and negative, expansive and contractive or the poles of a magnet. As the pattern is repeated, an alternation from one polarity to the other takes place creating pulse and rhythmic drive. Were the pattern to be suddenly reversed, the rhythm would be destroyed as in a reversing of one magnet within a series ... the patterns are held in place according to both the internal relationships between the drums and their relationship with clave ... Should the [music] fall out of clave the internal momentum of the rhythm will be dissipated and perhaps even broken.

== Percussion and clave alignment ==
Since a chord progression can begin on either side of clave, percussionists have to be able to initiate their parts in either half (a single measure in 2/2 or 2/4). The following examples show clave with the bongo bell and timbale bell parts in both a 3-2 and a 2-3 sequence. The timbale bell comes from a stick pattern (cáscara) used in the Afro-Cuban folkloric rhythm guaguancó.

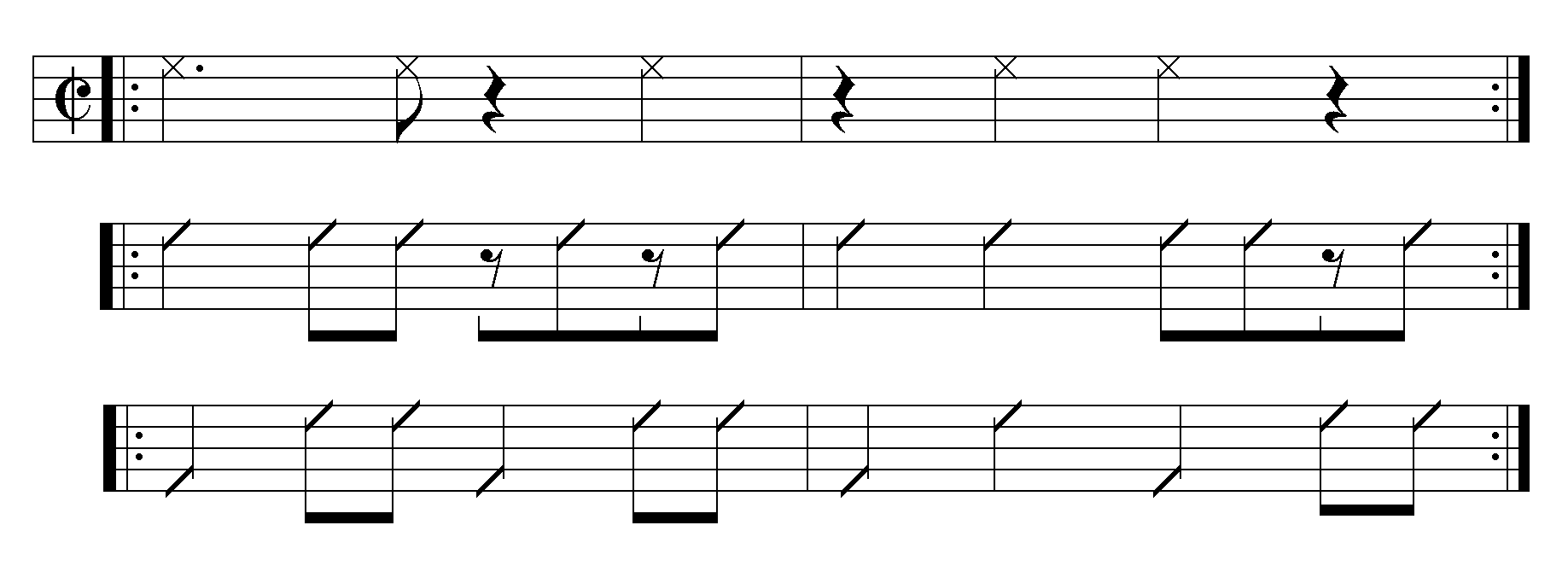
Timbale bell and bongo bell (bottom) in 3-2 clave.

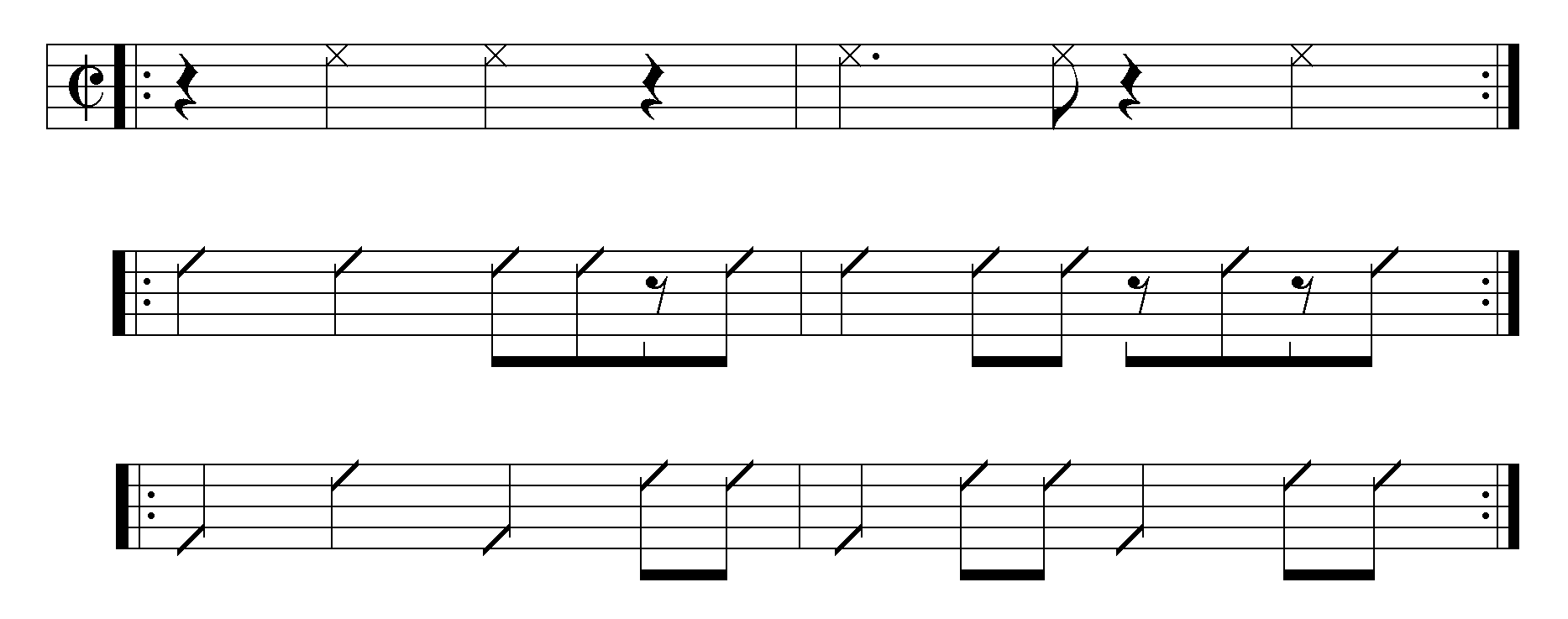
Timbale bell and bongo bell (bottom) in 2-3 clave.

The following example shows the most common conga (two drums), timbale bell, and bongo bell pattern combination used in salsa music.

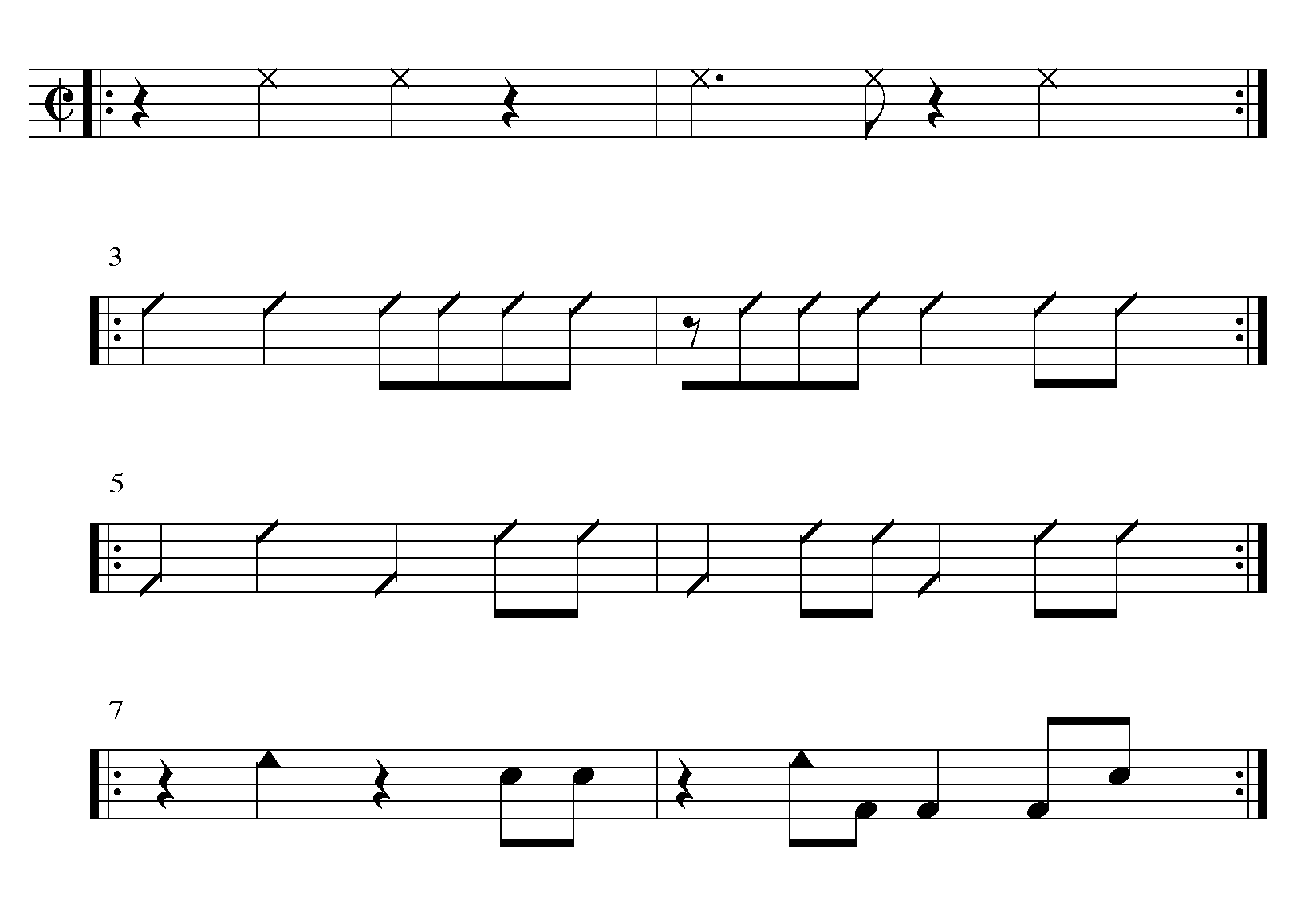
From top: 2-3 clave, timbale bell, bongo bell, two congas.

According to Bobby Sanabria, the 3–2, 2-3 concept and terminology was developed in New York City during the 1940s by Cuban-born Mario Bauzá, when he was music director of Machito's Afro-Cubans. The 3–2, 2-3 concept is a basic tenet of salsa, but it is not widely used in Cuba.

== Guajeo ==
A guajeo is a typical Cuban ostinato melody, most often consisting of arpeggiated chords in syncopated patterns. Guajeos are a seamless blend of European harmonic and African rhythmic structures. A piano guajeo may be played during the verse section of a song, but it is at the center of the montuno section. That is why some salsa musicians refer to piano guajeos as montunos. Piano guajeos are one of the most recognizable elements in salsa music. As Sonny Bravo explains: "In salsa, the piano is more of a percussion instrument than a melodic one, especially in ensemble playing. When you're backing a soloist, you play a riff over and over again. This is what we call guajeo. The pianist uses this guajeo to provide the rhythm section with its drive."

Clave and guajeos are commonly written in two measures of cut time (2/2) in salsa charts. This is most likely an influence of jazz conventions.

Most guajeos have a binary structure that expresses clave. Kevin Moore states: "There are two common ways that the three-side is expressed in Cuban popular music. The first to come into regular use, which David Peñalosa calls 'clave motif,' is based on the decorated version of the three-side of the clave rhythm." The following guajeo example is based on a clave motif. The three-side (first measure) consists of the tresillo variant known as cinquillo.

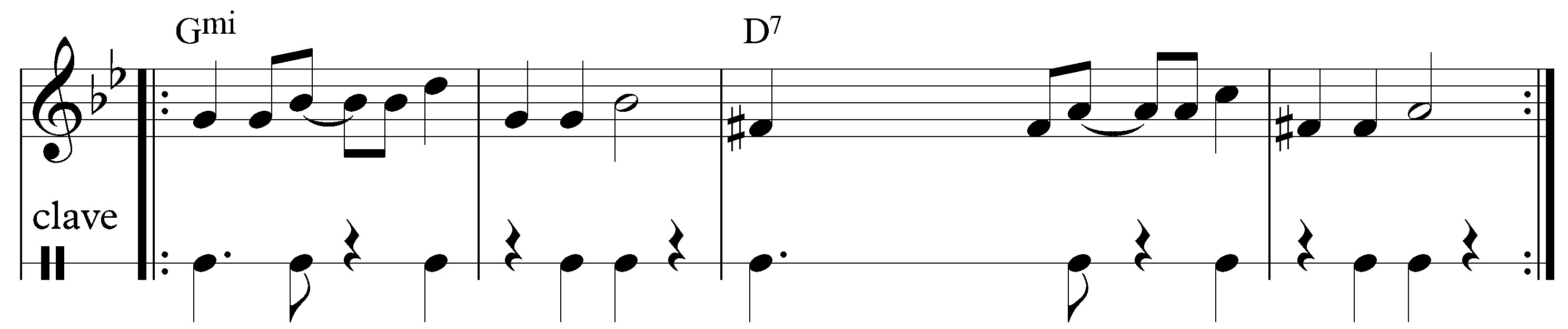
Piano guajeo: clave motif

A chord progression can begin on either side of clave. In salsa "one" can be on either side of clave, because the harmonic progression, rather than the rhythmic progression is the primary referent. When a chord progression begins on the two-side of clave, the music is said to be in two-three clave. The following guajeo is based on the clave motif in a two-three sequence. The cinquillo rhythm is now in the second measure.

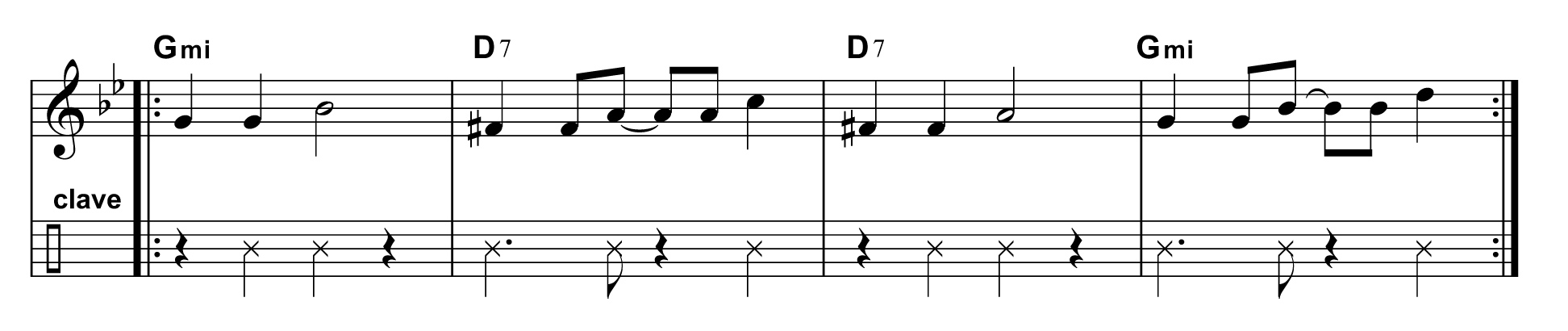
2-3 piano guajeo: clave motif

Moore: "By the 1940s [there was] a trend toward the use of what Peñalosa calls the 'offbeat/onbeat motif.' Today, the offbeat/onbeat motif method is much more common." With this type of guajeo motif, the three-side of clave is expressed with all offbeats. The following I IV V IV progression is in a three-two clave sequence. It begins with an offbeat pick-up on the pulse immediately before beat 1. With some guajeos, offbeats at the end of the two-side, or onbeats at the end of the three-side serve as pick-ups leading into the next measure (when clave is written in two measures).

3-2 guajeo: offbeat/onbeat motif.

This guajeo is in two-three clave because it begins on the downbeat, emphasizing the onbeat quality of the two-side. The figure has the same exact harmonic sequence as the previous example, but rhythmically, the attack-point sequence of the two measures is reversed. Most salsa is in two-three clave, and most salsa piano guajeos are based on the two-three onbeat/offbeat motif.

2-3 guajeo: onbeat/offbeat motif.

When salsa uses non-Cuban rhythms, such as a Puerto Rican plena, guajeos are essential to tie that genre in with the salsa format. The expression of the 2-3 onbeat/offbeat motif is more abstract in this guajeo than in others previous mentioned. The offbeat and onbeat pick ups begin at their extreme limit in the preceding measures. The third measure outlines a G7 chord. The other measures outline C.

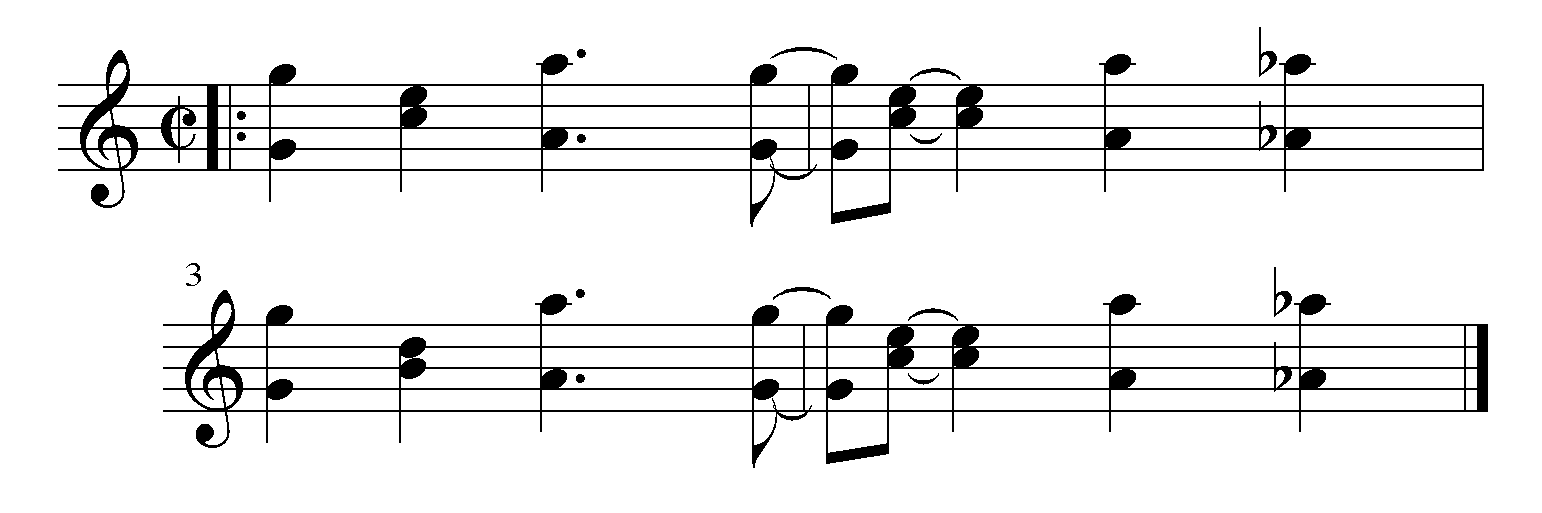
2-3 plena guajeo: onbeat/offbeat motif.

== Bass tumbao ==
Most salsa bass tumbaos are based on the tresillo pattern. Often the last note of the measure (ponche) is held over the downbeat of the next measure. In this way, only the two offbeats of tresillo are sounded. This tumbao is clave-neutral.

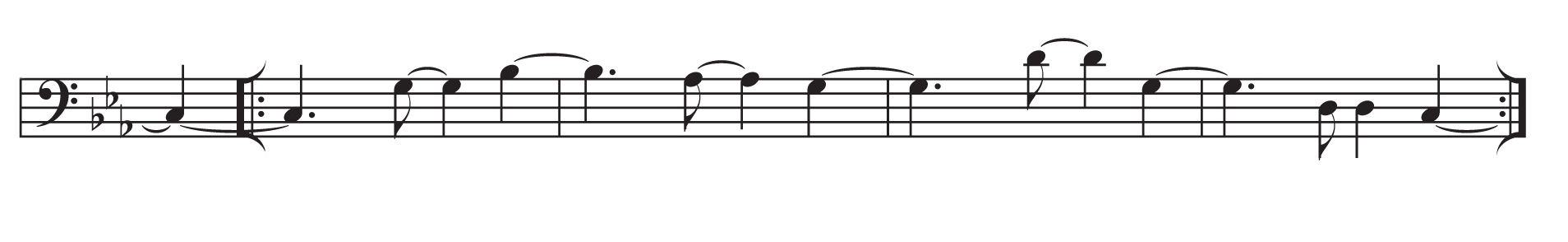
Clave-neutral tresillo-based tumbao.

Some salsa tumbaos that have a specific alignment with clave. The following 2-3 bass line coincides with three of the clave's five strokes.

== Moñas ==
A moña is a horn guajeo, which can be written or improvised. What's known as the Cuban típico style of soloing on trombone draws upon the technique of stringing together moña variations. The following example shows five different variants of a 2-3 trombone moña improvised by José Rodríguez on "Bilongo" (c. 1969), performed by Eddie Palmieri.

Moña 1 sounds every stroke of 2-3 clave except the first stroke of the three-side. Melodic variety is created by transposing the module in accordance to the harmonic sequence, as Rick Davies observes in his detailed analysis of the first moña:

The moña consists of a two-measure module and its repetition, which is altered to reflect the montuno chord progression. The module begins with four ascending eighth-notes starting on the second [quarter-note of the measure]. This configuration emphasizes the ... two-side of the clave. In both of the modules, these four notes move from G3 to Eb4. Although the first, third, and fourth notes (G3, C4, and Eb4) are identical in both modules, the second note reflects the change in harmony. In the first module, this note is the Bb3 third of the tonic harmony; in the module repetition, the A3 is the fifth of the dominant. Of the final five notes in the module, the first four are [offbeats]; the final D4 is on the [last quarter-note] in the second measure of the module. Along with the final D4, the initial D4 on the [last offbeat] in the first measure of the module and the Eb4 on the [offbeat] immediately preceding the final note of the module are identical in both modules. The [offbeats] in the second-module measure reflect the harmonic changes. The first version of the module is over the dominant chord and contains the pitches A3 (the fifth) and C4 (the seventh). A Bb3 is sounded twice on the two [offbeats] in the module's repetition and represents the third G minor tonic chord.

A section of layered, contrapuntal horn guajeos is also referred to sometimes as a moña. Moñas differ from typical rhythm section guajeos in that they often will rest for a beat or two within their cycle. Those beats within a measure not sounded by the moña are often "filled" by a chorus, or counter moña. The trumpet and trombone moñas shown below ("Bilongo") can be repeated verbatim, or altered. Improvisation is within a framework of repetition and the melodic contour of the moñas. In this way, multiple instrumentalists can improvise simultaneously while reinforcing the rhythmic/melodic momentum of the rhythm section.

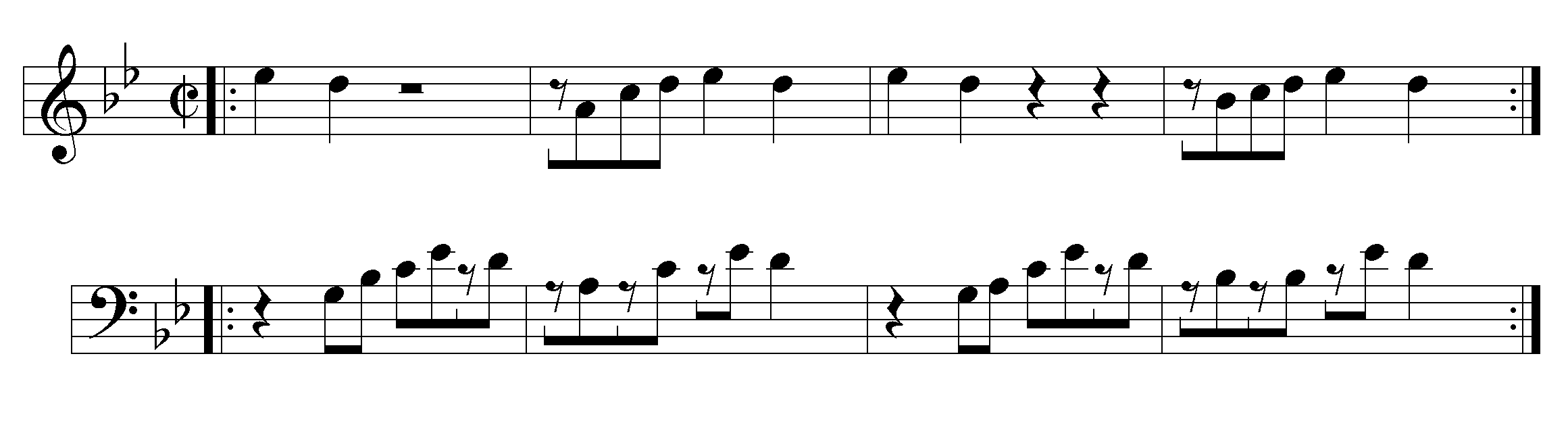
2-3 trumpet and trombone moñas, "Bilongo" (c. 1969) Top: trumpet; bottom: trombone.

The next moña layers are from the descarga "Guatacando" by the Fania All-Stars (1968). The trumpet figure is one clave in length, while the trombone figure is two claves. This is a classic example of how moñas are layered. The trombone Moña consists of two parts, a call-and-response structure. The trumpet moña begins on the last note of first half of the trombone moña. The second half of the trombone moña begins on the pulse (subdivision) immediately following the last note of the trumpet moña.

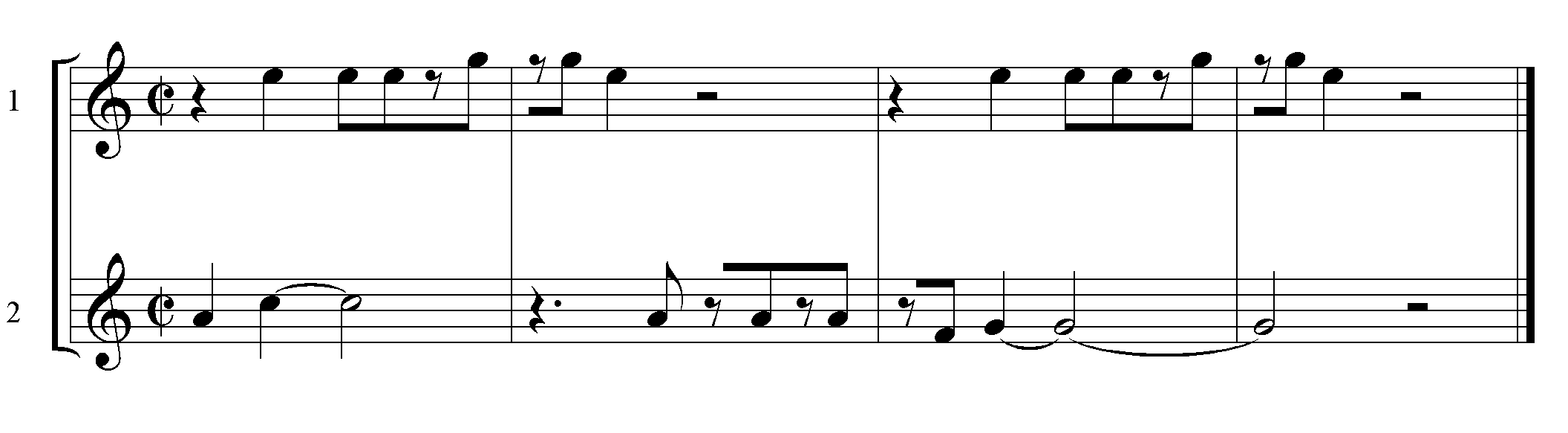
2-3 trumpet and trombone moñas, "Guatacando" (1968). 1. trumpets; 2. trombones.
