= Candela (American band) =

American salsa and Latin jazz band

Edgardo & Candela (Spanish for candle and/ or fire) is a San Francisco-based nine piece salsa music and Latin jazz band created in 1986 under the direction of Uruguayan born lead singer and conga drummer Edgardo Cambón. It consists of piano, bass, trombones, conga drums, bongo drums, timbales, and vocals.

Edgardo Cambón arrived to San-Francisco in 1986 and made records with Chucho Valdés (with Irakere, 1994), Keith Terry & Cross Pulse, Joan Baez, Claudia Gomez, Omar Sosa, Mark Levine, Jeff Narell, Andy Narell, Sovosó, Mike Spiro, Rebeca Mauleón, Jackie Rago, Richard Olsen Big Band, Los Compas, Sol y Luna Band, Eddie Montalvo, Johnny "Dandy" Rodriguez, Armando Perazza Pacific Mambo Orchestra and many others. Edgardo also taught workshops in Afro-Cuban percussion and vocals in many universities around the world. He also taught percussion for 5 years at Folsom State Prison as part of the rehabilitation program

The Bands repertoire includes various kinds of Latin music: Salsa, Son, Bolero, Mambo, Cha-cha-chá, Merengue, Timba, Bachata, Cumbia, Latin Jazz. and Uruguayan Candombe.

== Members ==
The band includes the following musicians: Marco Diaz, piano; Charlie Gurke on Saxes; Jeff Cressman, Dayron Calderón and Jamie Dubberly, trombones; Edgardo Cambón, vocals & congas; Omar Ledezma, bongó drums & background vocals; Walter Gonzalez and Mauro Camilo on Uruguayan Candombe Drums,Saúl Sierra , bass, Emilio Davalos, timbales & background vocals and Pedro Pastrana on Puerto Rican Cuatro Guitar. Many musicians play occasionally with this 40 years Bay Area band, like Doug Beavers (Spanish Harlem Orchestra and Eddie Palmieri) on Trombone, Jeff Cressman on Trombone, Sandy Cressman on Vocals, Karl Perazzo (from Santana Band), pianist Israel Tanenbaum, Calixto Oviedo, Jesus Diaz, Emilio Davalos, and Christian Pepin rotate on percussion as well.

== Recordings ==
- Ilusiones (1990), Orfeo, Uruguay
- Madre Rumba, Padre Son (2000), Pan Caliente Records, United States
- Celebrando 20 Años (English: Celebrating 20th Anniversary; 2008)
- Tatuajes Del Alma
- "For Export" Profile and CD at Latinbaum Records Latest release on Latinbaum Records.

All of Candela's records feature mainly compositions and lyrics by Edgardo Cambon with an array of great arrangers like: Rebeca Mauleón, Wayne Wallace, John Calloway, Marco Diaz, Charlie Gurke. Israel Tanenbaum among others.

The band has played at all major salsa clubs and festival around the Bay Area. as well as internationally in Habana Cuba, Upsala Sweden, Buenos Aires Argentina, and Bogotá Colombia. In 2025 Edgardo Cambón and Candela, performed for the first time at the "Monterey Jazz Festival", making Edgardo the first Uruguayan musician to ever play at this prestigious stage presenting Uruguayan Candombe music and drums from his country. MORE INFO AT www.musicandela.com
