= Johnny "Dandy" Rodríguez =

- Born: John Rodríguez Jr. September 11, 1945; New York City, New York, U.S.
- Died: August 16, 2024 (aged 78) Las Vegas, Nevada, U.S.
- Genres: Afro-Cuban jazz; salsa; son cubano; pachanga
- Occupation: Musician/Percussionist
- Instruments: Percussion; congas; bongo; cowbell; güiro
- Years active: 1962–2024

John Rodríguez Jr. (September 11, 1945 – August 16, 2024), better known as Johnny "Dandy" Rodríguez, was an American bongo player of Puerto Rican descent. He was the long-time bongosero for Tito Puente, and also played with Tito Rodríguez, Ray Barretto and Alfredo de la Fé. He belonged to several popular bands of the salsa era such as Tico All-Stars, Fania All-Stars and co-led Típica 73.

== Life and career ==
Rodríguez grew up in El Barrio (Spanish Harlem), New York, being interested in stickball (street baseball), rather than music. Nonetheless, influenced by his father, 17-year old Johnny earned a position playing bongos in the Tito Puente Orchestra. Johnny spent over 30 years with the orchestra, also working with Tito Rodríguez from 1965 to 1968 and with Ray Barretto from 1970 until the end of 1972. Johnny went on to form Típica 73, of which he remained a member until 1979. He then returned to Tito's band, playing alongside him until the time of Tito's death in May 2000.

He recorded with Ray Barretto, Willie Bobo, Cheo Feliciano, Wade Marcus, Orlando Marin, Gene Harris, Charlie Palmieri, Roberto Torres, Willie Rosario, Ralfi Pagan, Celia Cruz, Johnny Pacheco, The Cesta All-Stars, Pupi y Su Charanga, David Newman, Louie Ramirez, Ismael Quintana, The Manhattan Transfer, Vitin Aviles, Richie Ray & Bobby Cruz, David Amram, Fania All-Stars, Conjunto Clasico, Tito Nieves, Junior Gonzalez, Miguel Quintana, Henri Guédon, Charlie Rodriguez Y Su Conjunto, Henry Fiol, Tito Allen, Alfredo De La Fé, Johnny Rodriguez y Su Orquesta, Hector Ramos, Ray Martinez Y Su Sabor Criollo, Judy Kreston, David Lahm, Paquito D'Rivera, Lionel Hampton, La India, Cayuco, Angelo Vaillant, Ernest Alvarez, Frankie Morales, Orestes Vilató, Joe Cuba, Jimmy Sabater, Adalberto Santiago, and Johnny Cruz.

Percussion instrument manufacturer LP (Latin Percussion) markets a bongo set in his name called LP Johnny Rodriguez, Jr. Legend Bongos Standard as well as two cowbells entitled LP John "Dandy" Rodriguez Signature Low Pitch Hand Held Cowbell and LP John "Dandy" Rodriguez Signature High Pitch Hand Held Cowbell . Rodriguez led the Mambo Legends Orchestra along with Mitch Frohman and directed by Jose Madera up until his death.

== Personal life and death ==
He was the son of Johnny "La Vaca" Rodríguez (1930–2000), prolific conguero and bongosero of Puerto Rican ancestry who played in the bands of Noro Morales, Xavier Cugat, Machito, Tito Puente, and Tito Rodríguez (preceding his son in latter two cases) among others. He was nicknamed "La Vaca" (The Cow) by Machito's trumpeter Mario Bauzá in 1943, because of the young percussionist's large appearance.

Rodríguez suffered a stroke in May 2024. He died in Las Vegas on August 16, 2024; his last performance was with Tito Puente Jr. and His Orchestra.

== Discography ==
Dandy's Dandy– A Latin Affair... (Latin Percussion Ventures 1979)

== See also ==
- Salsa
- Charanga (Cuba)
- Afro-Cuban jazz
