= Típica 73 =

New York Cuban charanga and salsa band

- Origin: New York City
- Genres: Charanga, salsa
- Years active: 1973–1982
- Labels: Fania
- Members: José Alberto "El Canario"; Sonny Bravo; Alfredo de la Fé; Nelson González; Rene Lopez Sr.; Joseph Manozzi; Nicky Marrero; Dave Perez; Leopoldo Pineda; Johnny "Dandy" Rodriguez; Adalberto Santiago; Orestes Vilato; Camilo Azuquita
- Website: tipica73.com

Típica 73 was an American charanga and salsa band in the 1970s and early 1980s, that was formed by musicians from Ray Barretto's band. "Típica" refers to the typical configuration of a Cuban charanga while "73" refers to the year that group was founded. Tipica 73 was the first American salsa band to record in Cuba (Típica 73 En Cuba Intercambio Cultural) and included Adalberto Santiago, Alfredo de la Fé, José Alberto "El Canario" and Panamanian singer Luis Argumedes Camilo Azuquita who performed in the album of 1977.

In the New York salsa scene in the early 1970s, the group began with Johnny "Dandy" Rodriguez Jr. and four of Ray Barretto's original band including Adalberto Santiago (who all left Barretto simultaneously to start Tipica 73 in 1972), and, after combining the conjunto percussive style (congas, timbales, and bongos) with a horn section, the band became one of the biggest stars of the salsa movement in the US. However, the band's line-up ended up with an almost different cast by the start of the following decade, with several of the original members having left after differences in the late 1970s, regarding whether the band would continue to play tipica music, with Santiago and three others leaving to form Los Kimbos. Rodriguez Jr was the only constant in the band, and he and remaining members split in 1982, but not without a tribute to the charanga style, the 1980 release Charangueando con la Tipica 73, which included standout versions of Tito Puente's "A Donde Vas" and Cachao's "Chanchullo", among others. According to Greg Prato of All Music Guide Magazine, in 1995, Tipica 73 reunited for a successful concert in Puerto Rico, which led to a series of shows four years later.

== Discography ==
- Típica 73 (Inca 1031, 1972; Fania/Código Music 463 950 9058, 2011)
- Típica 73, Vol. 2 (Inca 1038, 1974; Fania/Emusica/UMG 773 130 226, 2007)
- La Candela (Inca 1043, 1975)
- Rumba Caliente (Inca 1051, 1976)
- The Two Sides of Típica 73 (Inca 1053, 1977)
- Salsa Encendida (Inca 1062, 1978)
- ...'74...'75...'76 (Inca 1063, 1978) compilation
- Típica 73 En Cuba – Intercambio Cultural (Fania 542, 1979)
- Charangueando Con La Típica 73 (Fania 560, 1980; Fania/Emusica/UMG 773 130 027, 2006)
- Into the 1980's (Fania 592, 1981; Fania/Emusica/UMG 773 130 130, 2006)
- The Best (Fania 781, 2003) compilation
