= Israel Kantor =

Musician and composer

- Israel Kantor
- Born: Wilfredo Israel Sardinas; October 16, 1949; Arcos de Canasi, Cuba
- Died: July 1, 2006 (aged 56); Miami, Florida, United States
- Other names: Wilfredo Israel Sardinas, Israel Sardinas, Wilfredo Israel Sardiñas Domínguez
- Occupations: Composer and musician
- Years active: 1970s–2006
- Known for: Los Van Van, Tropicana All-Stars
- Notable work: Recuerda a Benny Moré (2004)

Israel Kantor, also known as Israel Sardinas, Wilfredo Israel Sardinas, and Wilfredo Israel Sardiñas Domínguez, (16 October 1949 – 1 July 2006) was a Cuban-born musician and composer who later lived and worked in the United States. Born 1949 in a town called Alturas de Canasi with the name Wilfredo Israel Sardinas, he grew up in Havana, Cuba. He gained popularity in the 1970s as a sonero, a singer of the Son cubano style of music. Early influences included music by Beny More. He joined with Los Van Van in 1980 and toured globally with them, before leaving the group and moving to the United States in 1983.

Settling in Miami, Florida, he garnered support from Cuban exiles who had moved to Miami, Florida. While in New York City in 1984 he changed his name to Kantor as a reference to cantor, Spanish for singer, at the recommendation of colleague Johnny Pacheco. He recorded albums in the 1980s alongside musicians including: Sal Cuevas, Barry Rogers, Mario Rivera, and Sonny Bravo. His song "Ya Estoy Aquí" reached the number two top spot amongst popular music on Miami radio in 2002. Kantor joined the group Tropicana All-Stars in 2003, a twenty-piece orchestra band which performed tribute music hearkening back to the style of his early influence Beny More. The group's debut performance was on 18 May 2003 at the Fontainebleau Hotel in Miami Beach, Florida. While lead vocalist with the group, they received two Grammy Award nominations and two Latin Grammy Award nominations.

Kantor died of cancer in 2006 at his Miami home, survived by his wife. He was featured in the Iván Acosta directed 2005 documentary film Cómo se forma una rumba, which examined the influence of Cuban rumba on Cuban music.

== Early life and career in Cuba ==
Kantor was born with the name Wilfredo Israel Sardinas in 1949 in Alturas de Canasi, a locale in the Western region of Cuba. His birthplace is a town situated roughly equidistant from Matanzas and Havana, Cuba. He spent the majority of his early youth in Havana, the capital city of Cuba.

He first became popular in the 1970s, and rose to fame in Cuba as a sonero, a singer of the Son cubano style of music. He started out performing with pianist Meme Solís, who cultivated his singing skills. He was a fan of music by Raúl Planas and Benny Moré; listening to them helped shape his early musical style. He performed with Los Reyes '73, a tribute band to Los Van Van. His peak career in Cuba was during the years of 1979 to 1983. He served as lead vocalist of the group A.C., which stood for After Castro.

He linked up with the group Los Van Van in 1980 after they requested he become a member. At the time they were one of the more influential music groups within the genre of music of African Heritage in Cuba. He became the head of their group and became known for his unique signature singing style while performing with them. Kantor traveled with Los Van Van around the globe multiple times performing together with them. In 1983, he left Cuba for the United States, and relocated himself to Miami, Florida. He commented of his education in Cuba: "I had great schooling before coming to Los Van Van. [But] I had much restlessness to know the world, and so I decided not to return to Cuba."

== Move to United States ==
After his move to the United States, Kantor gained significant support amongst Cuban exiles who had moved to Miami, Florida. Latin music singer Dominican Johnny Pacheco recommended he change his from his birth-name to Kantor in reference to cantor meaning singer in Spanish language. He did so in 1984 while in New York City. Throughout the 1980s he recorded multiple music albums in New York; these were subsequently re-released in 2002 and showcased his vocal talents alongside musicians including: Sal Cuevas, Barry Rogers, Mario Rivera, and Sonny Bravo.

His career in the United States was not as successful as his prior results in Cuba. He traveled between New York and Miami recording nine albums, and settled permanently in South Florida in 1986. He released the album Un Señor Kantor in 1998 produced by Osvaldo Pichaco; the majority of which he composed himself. He was featured as the singer on a 2002 album by Juan Pablo Torres y su Super Son which contained new presentations of their prior songs they had made in Cuba years earlier. His song "Ya Estoy Aquí" reached the number two top spot amongst popular music on Miami radio in 2002. He served as vocalist on the 2003 Orlando Batista produced album Orquesta Sensación, which received praise from Latin Beat Magazine as "a dancer's paradise".

Kantor gained new-found recognition in 2003 with the group Tropicana All-Stars. Their group consisted of an orchestra with twenty members, and he served as their lead singer. Together they released the album Recuerda a Benny Moré in 2004, whose lyrics and style hearkened back to a more popular era of Cuban music from the 1950s under singer Beny More during his days performing at the Tropicana Club in Havana, Cuba.

The group released a DVD of their live performance 18 May 2003 at the Fontainebleau Hotel in Miami Beach, Florida. This was their debut performance, and it received a favorable reception from Latin Beat Magazine: "Lead singer Israel Kantor delivers majestically flora beginning to end". The group's song "Francisco Guayabal" reached the top 20 chart amongst highest played musical works on the radio in Los Angeles in 2004. During his time with the Tropicana All-Stars, they received recognition in the form of two Grammy Award nominations and two Latin Grammy Award nominations for their work on albums Tradicion, and Recuerda a Benny Moré.

== Death and legacy ==
He died from cancer on 1 July 2006, and left behind his wife. His death occurred at home, in his residence in the Southwest portion of Miami. Funeral services were held at Caballero Rivero funeral home in Miami, and he was interred 6 July 2006 at Woodland Park Cemetery.

Kantor was featured in the Iván Acosta directed 2005 documentary film Cómo se forma una rumba. Film during 2001, the documentary examined how differing styles of Cuban music were impacted by the Cuban rumba music and dance form.

== See also ==
- Afro-Cuban
- Grammy Award for Best Tropical Latin Album
- List of Cubans
- List of Cuban Americans
- Music of Cuba
- Music of Florida
