= Israel Tanenbaum =

American pianist, composer, and audio engineer

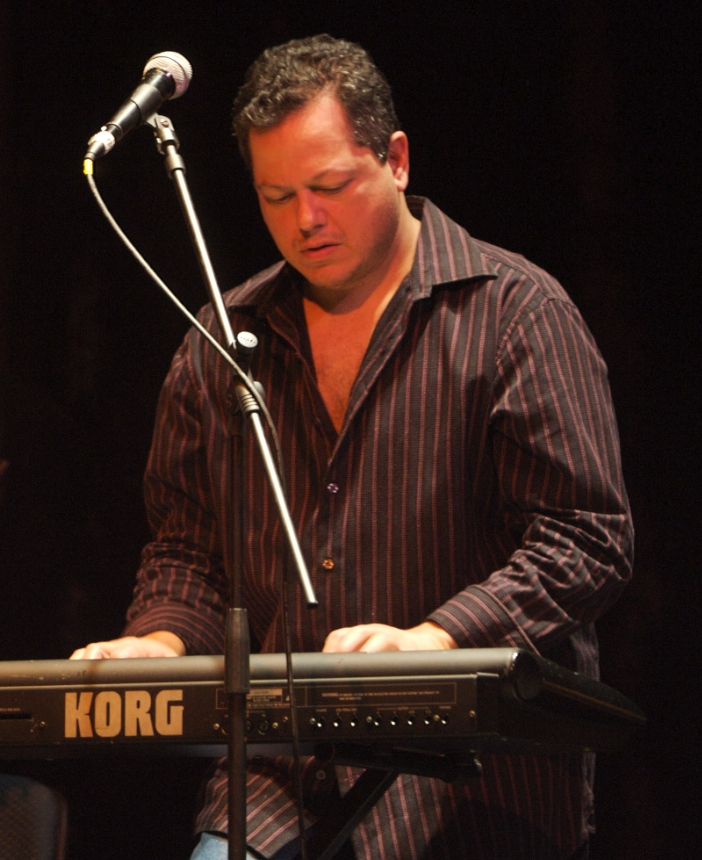

Background information
- Also known as: Izzy Tanenbaum
- Born: March 7, 1961 (age 65); The Bronx, New York City, New York, United States
- Origin: Puerto Rico
- Genres: Salsa, jazz, incidental music, film scoring, pop, rock
- Occupations: Pianist, recording artist, music producer, professor, composer, arranger
- Instruments: Piano, keyboards, percussion, trumpet
- Website: www.israeltanenbaum.com

Israel Tanenbaum-Rivera is an American pianist, music producer, composer, arranger and audio engineer who has produced more than 50 albums and participated in over 100 recordings.

== Salsa ==
Tanenbaum has performed with many of the classic salsa artists and bands such as Pete "El Conde" Rodriguez, Marvin Santiago, Daniel Santos, Tommy Olivencia, Cheo Feliciano, Santitos Colón, Lalo Rodríguez and Roberto Roena for whom he became musical director in 1986. Other major artists include Batacumbele, Orquesta Mulenze, Brenda K. Starr, Zaperoko and Ednita Nazario. In 1988, with a successful career as a pianist, Tanenbaum moved to Colombia and joined (as the producer, pianist and arranger) Guayacán Orquesta, one of Colombia's premiere salsa bands. Tanenbaum played a vital role in defining the sound that allowed Guayacán to effectively reach out to the growing U.S. and European Latino markets. This led to one Platinum and two Gold Records. In Colombia, Israel has worked with many other artists including Grupo Niche, Grupo Clase, Checo Acosta and Galy Galiano. Tanenbaum has taken special interest in all-female salsa bands -popular in Colombia- such as Caña Brava, Aché Orquesta and Santísima Charanga, and has contributed to the field as director, arranger and producer.

In 1992, Cuban violinist Alfredo De La Fé, who, at the time, lived in Medellín, Colombia, asked Tanenbaum to produce his next album "Con Toda la Salsa" for the Discos Fuentes label. The album included Israel's Latin Jazz composition Hacha y Machete which reached the jazz top 10 lists across Europe. This success opened the doors to the European markets and led to several tours during which Israel accompanied Alfredo as his pianist and musical director. In 1995, Tanenbaum produced La Salsa de los Dioses shortly before Alfredo moved to Italy. When Alfredo moved to New York in 2002, Israel -who was then living in the US- put together a band and toured the US with Alfredo. In 2018 Izzy settled in San Francisco Bay Area where he performs in a variety of venues with renown bands such as Candela (band) led by Uruguayan percussionist and singer Edgardo Cambón.

Tanenbaum has produced music for record labels like Sony, Phillips, CBS, BMG, Fania and Latinbaum Records.

== Jazz ==
Israel has played with jazz musicians such as Dave Valentin, Giovanni Hidalgo, John Benitez, David Sanchez, Juancito Torres Jazz Ensemble, and Richie Flores. In 1997 he mixed the album "Papo Lucca y La Cuban Jazz All Stars". In 2000 Israel recorded a Christmas album with trumpet player Frank Vardaros. Tanenbaum's compositions have been recorded by flutist Connie Grossman, pianist Papo Lucca: Tanenbaum a la Lucca (On Target with La Sonora Ponceña), and violinist Alfredo de la Fe: NN, Hacha y Machete. Since 2018 Izzy Tanenbaum can be heard performing in the San Francisco Bay Area with his ensemble Latinbaum and with renown musicians from the West Coast such as Pete Escovedo in classic venues like Yoshi's and Angelicas. In 2023, Israel debuted as solo artist in the Zoho Music label's album: Impressions, Israel Tanenbaum & The Latinbaum Jazz Ensemble, co-produced with John Benitez.

== Incidental music ==
Israel has composed music for documentary, theater, radio, multimedia, transmedia, television, videogames and film that has been nominated for various awards. In the 90's he created soundtracks for radio comedies and worked on the music for Amor, Mujeres y Flores, a Colombian documentary directed by Marta Rodríguez and Jorge Silva, and for the TV series Otra en Mi. For the first Iberoamerican Theater Festival in Bogota, Israel composed the music for one of the first transmedia performances in Colombia, alongside illustrator and storyteller Alekos. Tanenbaum has written music for Martin Guigui's movies: Swing, My X-Girlfriend's Wedding and Cattle Call. The music for "Swing" was awarded Best Soundtrack in a feature film at the 2003 Latin USA Film Festival and Best Impact of Music in an Independent Feature Film at the 2004 Park City Film Music Festival. In 2009 he composed the music for El Atolondrado, an adaptation for clown of Molière's classic by Argentinian director, Ricardo Behrens produced by the Colombian National Theater. In addition, he has produced jingles for many clients such as Renault, Hyundai and Eveready.

== Folklore/Traditional music ==
Israel has studied the musical roots of afro-caribbean rhythms and traditional music of places where he has lived like Korea and Colombia. He enjoys incorporating elements of folklore in his compositions and arrangements. Tanenbaum has produced artists like Puerto Ricans Felita Oyola and Celia Ayala (of the renown folklore group "La Familia Ayala") as well as Colombian Juana Francisca Alvarez (Esencia de Currulao) and Categoría Vallenata. He recorded the participants of the First Marimba Festival in Cali Colombia in 2008 where he was the Technical Director. His own experimental project Latinbaum mixes elements of folklore with rock, pop and jazz.

== Teaching ==
Tanenbaum has developed curriculum for teaching in informal and formal settings in his different areas of expertise. In the United States, he has run workshops to teach jazz, Afro-Caribbean rhythms and audio production. In 2004, he developed the Audio Recording Technician Program for the Roxbury Community College in Boston, MA. While in Boston, Israel also worked with WGBH Educational Foundation, in collaboration with the Boston Public Schools, on the production of the "Music and Words" program which integrates music and literature into curriculum based activities. In Colombia, he created and taught the first university classes on jazz history and harmony, salsa and Latin ensembles for the music program at Javeriana University in the late 80s/early 90s. On his return to Colombia in 2008, he introduced music business classes to the Javeriana Faculty of Arts where he taught and directed Latin and jazz ensembles until 2014. As the leader for ViveLab Huila in Pitalito Colombia, Israel was responsible for dozens of workshops to train thousands of people from the region under the slogan "Building the Digital Future" as well as continuing education programs in animation, youth entrepreneurship and cultural activities such as the San Agustin Film Festival and performances by youth orchestras.

== Acoustic Design ==
Israel is an expert in the design of sound insulation for rehearsal and recording studios. In the decade of the 80s, he designed the first rehearsal studio in Bogota, Colombia (in the downtown neighborhood of "La Concordia") used by bands such as Guayacan, Ivan and Lucia and Ache. In the 90s, Israel designed studios for various artists and bands including Guayacan in Cali, Yurumei Studio owned by Honduran Efrain Martinez, Char Studio for the Colombian pianist Simon Char in Boston, Massachusetts and Chekere Studio for the Cuban percussionist Jorge Najarro in Rhode Island. In 2010, Tanenbaum built the rehearsal and recording rooms of K30 Estudio in Bogotá and in 2012, he was a consultant for the design of the recording studio for the Technological and Cultural Center Somos Pacífico in Cali, Colombia.

== Festivals and venues ==
Israel has performed (among others) at:

- New Morning, Paris, France
- Festival de Música del Caribe, Cartagena, Colombia
- JVC Jazz Festival, Turin, Italy
- Nice Jazz Festival, Nice, France
- Festival de Jazz Teatro Libre, Bogotá, Colombia
- Festival Latino, Switzerland
- Open Tropen Jazz Festival, Belgium
- Feria de Cali, Cali, Colombia
- Roots Festival, Holland
- Village Gate, New York, NY
- Yoshi's, Oakland, CA
- SOB's, New York, NY
- Vermont Jazz Festival, Burlington, VT
- Festival Latino Americano, Florence, Italy
- Carnaval de Barranquilla, Barranquilla, Colombia
- Festival Iberoamericano de Teatro, Bogotá, Colombia
- Madison Square Garden, New York, NY
- Festival de Música de Barichara, Santander, Colombia
- Angelicas, Redwood City, CA

== Affiliations ==
- ASCAP
- Acinpro

== Selected discography ==
- Semilla (producer, composer, arranger, pianist)
- Israel Tanenbaum & The Latinbaum Jazz Ensemble (solo artist, producer, composer, arranger, pianist)
- Guayacán Orquesta: Qué la Sangre Alborota, La Más Bella, 5 Años Aferrados al Sabor, Sentimental de Punta a Punta, A Verso y Golpe, Marcando la Differencia, Como en un Baile, Con Sabor Tropical, De Nuevo en la Salsa (producer, arranger, pianist)
- Alfredo de la Fe: Con toda la salsa, Salsa de los dioses (producer, composer, arranger, pianist)
- Sonora Ponceña: On Target -> Tanenbaum a la Lucca (composer, arranger)
- Iván y Lucía (producer, arranger, pianist)
- Nino Caicedo (producer, arranger, pianist)
- Fania All Stars: Bravo 97 (arranger)
- Aché Orquesta: Ya es hora (producer, arranger, pianist)
- Checo Acosta (producer, arranger, pianist)
- Galy Galiano: Sin Fronteras (producer, arranger, pianist)
- Obbini Tumbao (producer)
- Leslie Mendez (producer, arranger, pianist)
- Orquesta Tiempo (producer, arranger, pianist)
- Roberto Roena: Regreso (pianist)
- Zaperoko (pianist)
- Grupo Niche (pianist)
- Connie Grossman (composer, arranger, pianist)
- Yambé (producer, arranger, pianist)
- Grupo Clase (producer, arranger)
- Carlos Vega (producer, arranger, pianist)
- La Banda de Alexis (producer, pianist)
- Categoría Vallenata (producer)
- Celia y Tito Ayala (producer)
- Algo Nuevo (producer, arranger, pianist)
- Alvaro del Castillo (producer, arranger, pianist)
- Nina (producer)
- Orquesta Matecaña (producer, pianist)
- Yenyeré (producer, arranger, pianist)
- La Trombonera (pianist)
- Delazcar Quintero (producer, arranger, pianist)
- Orquesta Solución (producer, arranger, pianist)
- Sonora Grupera (producer, arranger, pianist)
- Sandunga (producer, pianist)
- Frank Vardaros (producer, arranger, pianist)
- Salsa Night Band: La Cadena Se Rompió (producer, arranger, pianist)
- Azulito Aguamarina (producer, pianist)
- Satin (producer, arranger, pianist)
- Esencia de Currulao (producer, pianist)
- Felita Oyola (producer, arranger, pianist)
