= Vic-Fezensac =

Vic-Fezensac Vic en Fesensac
- Commune
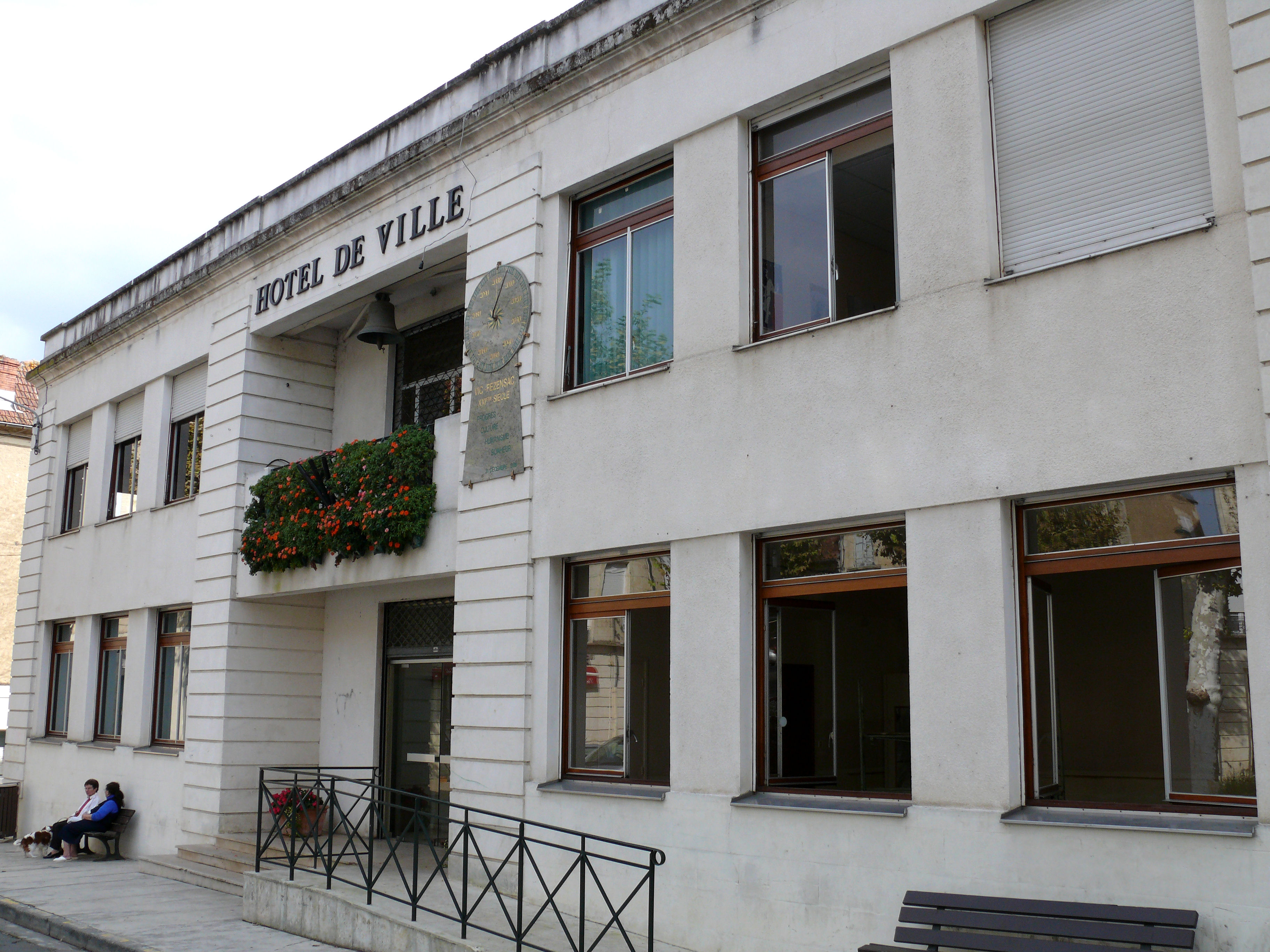
- Vic-Fezensac Town Hall

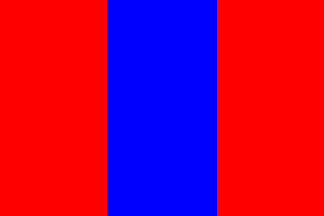
- Flag Coat of arms
- Location of Vic-Fezensac
- Location within France Location within Occitanie
- Coordinates: 43°45′34″N 0°18′15″E
- Country: France
- Region: Occitania
- Department: Gers
- Arrondissement: Auch
- Canton: Fezensac
- Intercommunality: Artagnan en Fézensac

Government
  - Mayor (2020–2026): Barbara Neto
- Area^{1}: 53.94 km^{2} (20.83 sq mi)
- Elevation: 110 m (360 ft)
- Highest elevation: 231 m (758 ft)
- Lowest elevation: 102 m (335 ft)
- Population (2023): 3,577
  - Density: 66.31/km^{2} (171.8/sq mi)
- Time zone: UTC+01:00 (CET)
  - Summer (DST): UTC+02:00 (CEST)
- INSEE/Postal code: 32462 /32190
- ^{1} French Land Register data, which excludes lakes, ponds, glaciers > 1 km^{2} (0.386 sq mi or 247 acres) and river estuaries.

Vic-Fezensac (French pronunciation: [vik fəzɑ̃sak]; Gascon: Vic en Fesensac; Occitan: Vic de Fesensac) is a commune in the Gers department in the Occitanie region of Southwestern France.

The commune is listed as a Village étape.

== Geography ==
=== Localisation ===
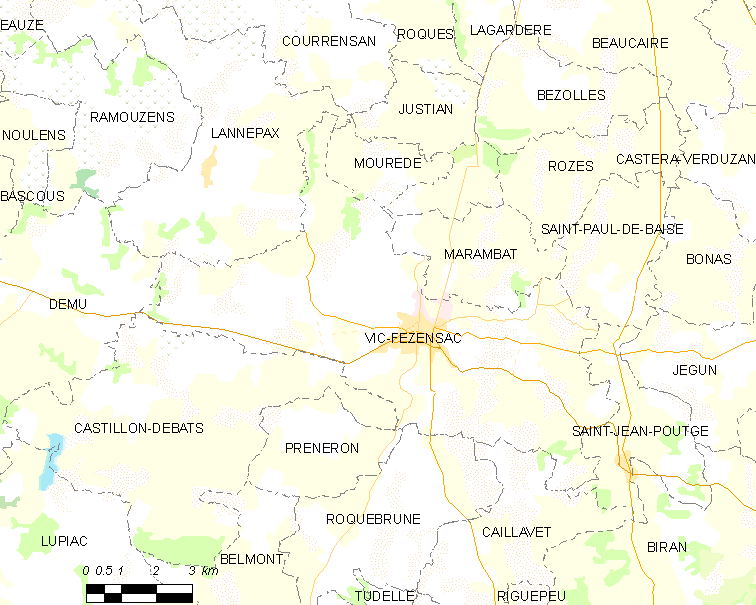
Vic-Fezensac and its surrounding communes

Vic-Fezensac is in the Côtes de Gascogne wine region.

=== Hydrography ===
The Auzoue flows north through the western part of the commune and forms most of its north-western border.

The Osse flows north through the middle of the commune and crosses the town.

== Population ==
Historical population
Year	Pop.	±% p.a.
1968	4,109	—
1975	4,111	+0.01%
1982	3,978	−0.47%
1990	3,683	−0.96%
1999	3,614	−0.21%
2007	3,651	+0.13%
2012	3,622	−0.16%
2017	3,474	−0.83%
2023	3,577	+0.49%
Source: INSEE

== Events ==
Vic-Fezensac is one of the last towns in France which still showcases bullfighting. The main feria takes place over the Pentecost weekend. On this occasion tens of thousands of people gather all night long over the weekend in the tiny streets of the city. It is the first big "feria" of the year in Southwestern France. Small bodegas crowded with people are open until the morning comes, "bandas" (bands of popular Basque or Gascon music) goes on the streets.

At the end of July the Tempo Latino salsa festival takes place. Night markets ("marchés de nuit") are also held in summer.

== Notable people ==
Jean Castex, born 25 June 1965, the former French prime minister.

Nigel Lawson, UK Chancellor of the Exchequer from 1983 to 1989, lived here in the 2000s and 2010s.

== See also ==
- Communes of the Gers department
