= Salsa Dura (album) =

Studio album by Jimmy Bosch
- Released: 1999
- Genre: Salsa
- Label: RykoLatino
- Producers: Jimmy Bosch, Aaron Levinson, Mark Bingham

Jimmy Bosch chronology
Soneando Trombon (1998)	Salsa Dura (1999)	El Avión de la Salsa (2004)

Salsa Dura is an album by the American trombonist Jimmy Bosch, released in 1999. The title translates to "hard salsa", Bosch's descriptor for his music, and the style of salsa that was less popular than the salsa romántica of the 1990s. Bosch also named his band Salsa Dura.

== Production ==
The album was produced by Bosch, Aaron Levinson, and Mark Bingham. Bosch wrote 10 of Salsa Dura's 12 tracks. "Speak No Evil" is a cover of the Wayne Shorter song. Steve Turre and Chucho Valdes played on the album. David Sánchez soloed on "Canta Mi Mozambique".

== Critical reception ==
Professional ratings
Review scores
Source	Rating
AllMusic	3.5/5 stars
The Encyclopedia of Popular Music	3/5 stars
Orlando Sentinel	5/5 stars

JazzTimes wrote that "it is Bosch's trombone that brings out the character of the music: hot, yes, but not heavy, worldly and knowing, and ultimately engaging." The Orlando Sentinel thought that "Bosch is a first-rate writer ... he and his group of monster improvisers don't traffic in trite riffs or predictable arrangements." Jazziz deemed the album an "industrial strength variant of urbanized, AfroCuban-rooted dance music."

The Toronto Star noted that "Bosch filters son, plena, conga, descarga and bolero forms through a more muscular framework." The Sun-Sentinel stated that Bosch's "brand of salsa dura—the sound he created by returning salsa to its Afro-Cuban call-and-response roots, employing instrumental solos and improvisation—makes him one of Latin America's most dynamic bandleaders."

AllMusic called the album "a collection of salsa dance tunes, sescargas, boleros, mozambiques, plenas and guajiras with detailed arrangements and energetic playing from Bosch and his band."

== Track listing ==
No.	Title	Length
1.	"La Chacharra"
2.	"Canta Mi Mozambique"
3.	"Pa' Mantener Tradición"
4.	"La Noticia"
5.	"Impacto Tendremos"
6.	"Toco el Trombón"
7.	"Viento Frío"
8.	"Speak No Evil"
9.	"Amor por Tí"
10.	"Vengo de Amor"
11.	"Sigo Cambiando"
12.	"Un Poquito Más"
