= Coro-pregón =

Coro-pregón (or coro-guía, coro-inspiración) in Afro-Cuban music and other Afro-Latin Latin music (mainly from the Puerto Rico), most of all salsa, but also in some non-Cuban genres like merengue and bachata, refers to a call and response section between the lead singer and the coro (chorus). It is found in most Cuban genres, for example son and son montuno, rumba, cha-cha-chá, timba, and many more.

== Origins ==
The practice of call and response singing probably stems from traditional African music and was brought to Cuba by slaves. It can still be found in its ancient form in Cuban religious music. Vocal improvisations are also based on market vendors' chants, called pregón.

== Pregón ==
The lead singer usually improvises both melody and lyrics (although most singers have some standard lines which they use quite frequently). This is called guía or pregón. The term pregón also refers to a vocal improvisation without coro, and a genre in which such vocal improvisation is very important. The main language for guías is Spanish, but other languages like Bantú, Dahome, Lukumí and Congolese are sometimes featured as well, either for complete guías or as single words within a Spanish guía. In timba music, English and Spanglish are sometimes used as a special effect. Many singers have a special word or phrase that they insert into their improvisation as a trademark. The most famous example is Celia Cruz's "¡Azúcar!" ("Sugar!") or another being Antony Santos' "¡El Mayimbe Otra Vez!". In timba and other more recent styles, the pregón is sometimes replaced by a rap section.

== Coro ==
The coro has fixed melody and lyrics. These can change during a piece, though, and are often made up on-the-fly, but within one section, they are repeated unchanged. Coros are usually homophonic, but not necessarily in unison. Most coros feature two or three parts, rarely more, moving in parallel lines. The parts may or may not be doubled, according to the artist's preference and possibilities. Some genres like rumba prefer a more massive coro sound and double parts whenever possible, while other genres like salsa dura prefer the clean sound of a small coro. The lyrics are generally based on the theme of the song (called the son); frequently the coro resolves the tension built up in the theme, or gives a new twist to it. The coro can also be based on the main idea of the theme, or a part of the theme's lyrics. Singing coro requires great accuracy, both rhythmically and harmonically. The coro singer's function in a band is more like an instrumentalist's than a singer's.

== Function ==
Coro-pregón forms the framework of the montuno section in most of the genres using it. It alternates with mambo (also known as moña) sections, instrumental solos, percussion breaks and, depending on genre, other sections. In traditional genres, changing the coro requires changing the mambo, and vv. A coro-pregón section traditionally starts and ends with a coro, although certain situations may require an exception. There are several ways of introducing the first coro-pregón section:

- Start directly from the theme. Often, the coro is the last line of the theme, and will introduce itself.
- Instrumental estribillo or break. The theme ends with a short instrumental break or estribillo, which introduces the coro.
- Solo-coro. Instead of the lead singer, an instrumentalist (typically a trumpetist) takes a few solos to get the montuno going. After that, the guías are enforced by adding the campana bell.

Some songs do not have a (vocal) theme but rather contain only coro-pregón. This form is often found in genres like montuno and descarga. Similarly, the danzón-chá (derived from danzón often features an instrumental theme (the danzón), followed by a montuno section (the chá or cha-cha-chá) with coro-pregón. Timba music and other related genres also employ a breakdown of the rhythm section while the Coro-pregón and the piano continue. This effect is also called timba, sometimes "presión".
