= Jimmy Bosch =

American Band Leader

- Also known as: El Trombon Criollo
- Born: Jimmy Bosch; Jersey City, New Jersey, U.S.
- Genres: Salsa
- Occupations: Band Leader; Trombonist
- Years active: 1962–present
- Labels: Rykodisc; JRGR Records

Jimmy Bosch, also known as "El Trombon Criollo", is a jazz and salsa music trombonist, composer, and bandleader of Puerto Rican descent born in Jersey City, New Jersey. He was raised in Hoboken, New Jersey, and graduated from Hoboken High School in 1975.

== Early career ==
Having performed since age eleven, by age thirteen he was playing in several local Latin music bands, "La Caliente", "Arco Iris", "La Sonica." While at Rutgers University studying classical music at age eighteen he left college in his second year when he met Manny Oquendo and joined his band.

== Later career ==
He worked with Manny Oquendo on and off for over 20 years. Jimmy worked with Ray Barretto from the early 1980s to early 1990s. In 1996 he founded his own band "La Orquesta Jimmy Bosch", and has recorded four albums as a solo artist. Jimmy began working with Israel Cachao in 1987, recorded and toured with Cachao also for over 20 years. Having recorded on over 100 recordings, Jimmy has toured with the Fania All-Stars, Eddie Palmieri, Ruben Blades, Tipica Novel, Combinacion Perfecta, Pete "El Conde" Rodríguez, and so many more on a global level. Jimmy continues to tour as a solo artist and band leader imparting his years of experience with musicians all over the world. "La Orquesta Jimmy Bosch" and Jimmy Bosch y su Sexteto de Otro Mundo" continues to tour globally.

Bosch is an artist/clinician for Michael Rath Trombones. His personal instrument is a brass/nickel silver Rath R2.

== Discography ==
- Soneando Trombon (1998, Rykodisc)
- Salsa Dura (1999, Rykodisc)
- El Avión de la Salsa (2004, JRGR Records)
- ¡A Million! (2009, JRGR Records)

== Filmography ==
- Music of the Heart (soundtrack)(1999)
- Girlfight (soundtrack)(2000)
- Pasos Latinos, a Mambo-mentary (2005)

== See also ==
- Salsa
- Charanga (Cuba)
- Afro-Cuban jazz
