= Orlando Marin =

American band leader and timbales player (born 1935)

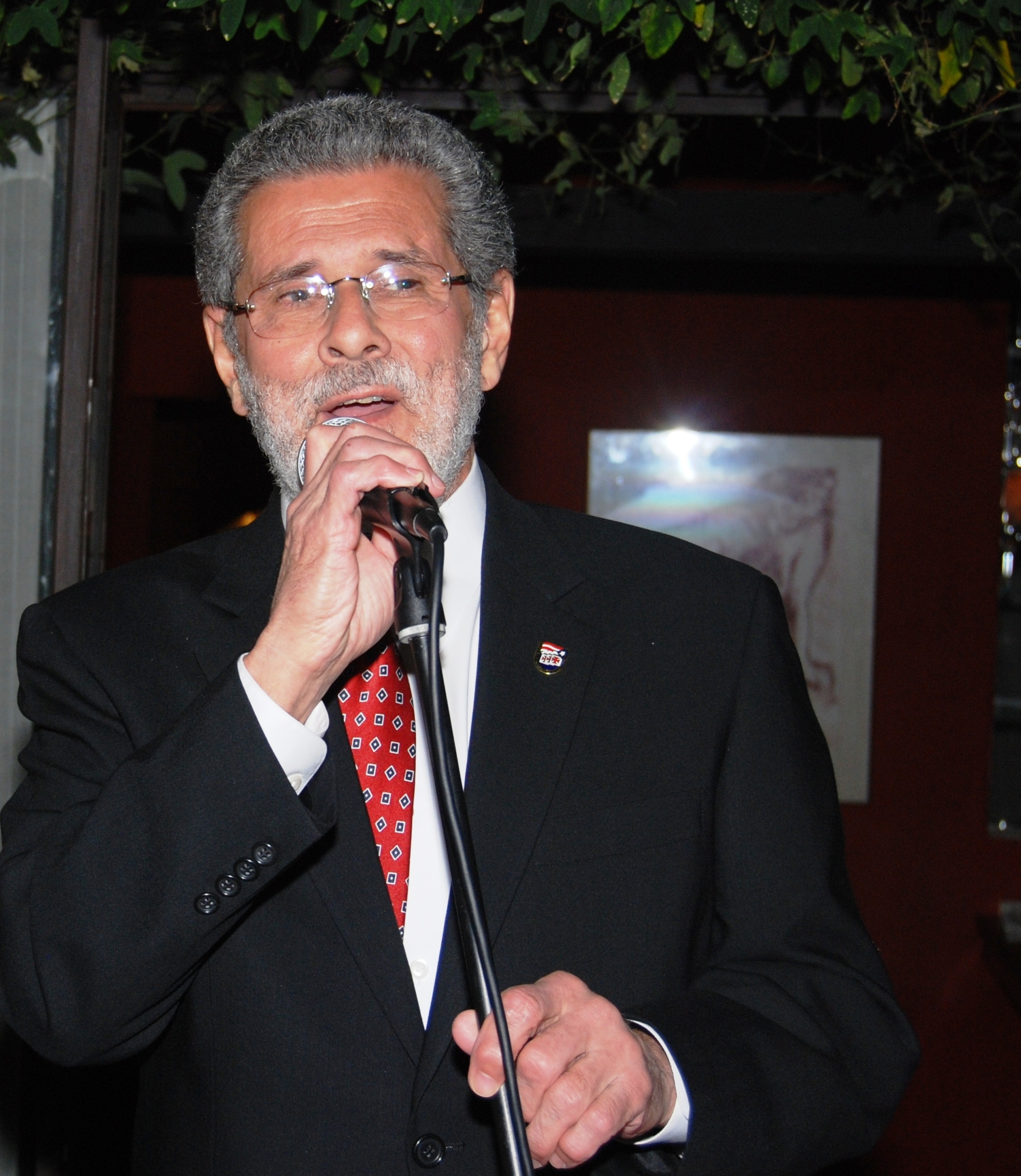

Background information
- Born: Orlando Marín; February 20, 1935; The Bronx, New York, U.S.
- Died: October 27, 2023 (aged 88) New York, U.S.
- Genres: Latin jazz, mambo
- Occupations: Musician, singer
- Instrument: Timbales
- Years active: 1951–2023
- Labels: Plus, Fiesta
- Formerly of: Orlando Marin and his Orchestra

Orlando Marin (February 20, 1935 – October 27, 2023) was an American bandleader and timbales player. He formed his first band, Eddie Palmieri and his Orchestra, in 1951–52 with himself as director and Eddie Palmieri as musical director and later on the piano. He was of Puerto Rican descent.

== Life and career ==
After his first group broke up, Marin got a contract at Sunnyside Garden for almost three years to play every Saturday. This was his first steady gig. Along with his music, he studied as a commercial artist, or comic book illustrator. He played with several different bands in the famous Palladium Ballroom.

Marin went into the army in 1958 for service in Korea. While on duty, he won first prize in the All Army Talent Competition in the Pacific Command. He then toured Korea and Japan and went to Washington DC for the final competition. This was followed by a performance on The Ed Sullivan Show. When stationed in California, Orlando sat in for Tito Puente on timbales at the Hollywood Palladium.

Marin left the army in 1960 and formed a new band with many of his previous members. He returned to New York. He again appeared at the Palladium Ballroom and other New York dance venues, including the Limbo Lounge, the Bayside Manor, the Hotel Taft, and the Bronx's Hunts Point Palace, among others.

Marin was a contemporary of such greats as Tito Puente, Machito, and Tito Rodriguez.

Marin died in New York on October 27, 2023, at the age of 88.

== Awards ==
- In 1976, Marin was invited to represent Hispanic America at the U.S. Bicentennial Celebration on Ellis Island.
- In 1993 in Colombia, Marin was honored with a lifetime musical achievement award in Calis Plaza de Toros.
- In 1997, Latin music historiographer Max Salazar presented Orlando a plaque at New York's at La Maganette in recognition of nearly five decades of uninterrupted contribution to Latin music.
- In 1999, New York's governor George E. Pataki presented Orlando with the Bobby Capó Lifetime Achievement Award in recognition of nearly a half century of dedication to Latin music.
- In January 2003, Marin was invited by Latin Jazz station, WPFW, by the Arlington County (Virginia) Cultural Arts Division, and by the Latin American Folk Institute to do a live concert in Washington at The Spectrum Theater.
- In 2006, Congressman Jose E. Serrano honored Orlando as "The Last Mambo King", for his continuing to provide Latin American music and his willingness to devote time to helping the less fortunate.

== Recording career ==
In 1954 he recorded first composition, My Mambo on 78 (rpm). His first two albums Arriba Cha-Cha-Cha, and Let's Go Latin were recorded for Fiesta Records. He recorded Mi Mambo on the Plus label. He recorded Se Te Quemó La Casa, and Que Chévere for Alegre Records. Marin then returned to Fiesta Records, for whom he recorded Está en Algo (English: He's Up To Something) which included the hit "Aprende a Querer". In 1970, he recorded Out of My Mind, for the Brunswick label. Then, he released his album Saxophobia. In 1961, Marin released his hit charanga record Se Te Quemó la Casa.

== Discography ==
- Mi Mambo (Plus, 1954)
- Arriba Cha-Cha-Cha (Fiesta, 1959)
- Let's Go Latin (Fiesta)
- Que Chévere (English: That's Great) (Alegre, 1960)
- Se Te Quemó La Casa (English: You Burn the House) (Alegre, 1961)
- Está en Algo (English: He's Up to Something) (Fiesta)
- Out of My Mind (Brunswick, 1970)
- Saxophobia (Manana, 1970)
- Orlando Marin and His Orchestra, Vol. 2 (Fania, 2000)
- Latin Cool Classics (Latin Cool, 2006)
