= Sonny Bravo =

American musician

Sonny Bravo (born October 7, 1936), born Elio Osacar, is an Afro-Cuban jazz and Latin jazz pianist. He was once a very good baseball player with many prospects born in New York, New York, though due to an injury in 1956 he sought out a career in music. It was then he started performing with Many Campo, El Casino de Miami, José Fajardo and many others. He also recorded with Tito Puente and Bobby Paunetto.

== Discography ==
With Tito Nieves

- Felicitaciones (Lo Mejor, 1980)
- Si No Bailan Con Ellos, No Bailan Con Nadie (Lo Mejor, 1981)
- Las Puertas Abiertas (Lo Mejor, 1983)

With Johnny Pacheco

- Llego Melon (Vaya, 1977)
- Los Dos Mosqueteros (Vaya, 1977)
- Pacheco y Fajardo (Fania, 1982)

With Tito Puente

- Mambo Diablo (Concord Jazz Picante, 1985)
- Sensacion (Concord Jazz Picante, 1986)
- Un Poco Loco (Concord Jazz Picante, 1987)
- Salsa Meets Jazz (Concord Picante, 1988)
- Live at Birdland Dancemania '99 (RMM, 1998)
- Goza Mi Timbal (Concord Picante, 1990)
- Out of This World (Concord Picante, 1991)
- The Mambo King: 100th LP (RMM, 1991)
- Mambo of the Times (Concord Jazz Picante, 1992)
- Royal T (Concord Picante, 1993)
- Master Timbalero (Concord Picante, 1994)
- Tito's Idea (TropiJazz, 1995)
- Special Delivery (Concord Jazz Picante, 1996)
- Mambo Birdland (RMM, 1999)
- Masterpiece/Obra Maestra (Universal, 2000)

With Típica 73

- Típica 73 (Inca, 1973)
- La Típica 73, Vol. 2 (Inca, 1974)
- La Candela (Inca, 1975)
- Rumba Caliente (Inca, 1976)
- "Pare Cochero" b/w "Gandinga" (Inca, 1976)
- "Rumba Caliente" b/w "Guaguanco De Los Violentos" (Inca, 1976)
- The Two Sides of Típica 73 (Inca, 1977)
- Salsa Encendida (Inca, 1978)
- En Cuba - Intercambio Cultural (Fania, 1979)
- Charangueando Con La Típica 73 (Fania, 1980)
- Into the 80's (Fania, 1981)

With others

- George Benson & Joe Farrell, Benson & Farrell (CTI, 1976)
- Justo Betancourt, Leguleya No (Fania, 1982)
- Ruben Blades, Metiendo Mano! (Fania, 1977)
- Bill Cosby, Where You Lay Your Head (Verve, 1990)
- Joe Cuba, Cocinando La Salsa (Fania, 2008)
- Alfredo de la Fé, Para Africa Con Amor (Sacodis, 1979)
- Alfredo de la Fé, Charanga Caliente (Envidia, 2003)
- Dimension Latina, Combinacion Latina No. 4 (Velvet, 1979)
- Dimension Latina, Tremenda Dimension! (Eco, 1981)
- Jose Fajardo, El Talento Total (Coco, 1977)
- Terry Gibbs, The Latin Connection (Contemporary, 1986)
- La Lupe, En Algo Nuevo (Tico, 1980)
- Mongo Santamaria, Ubane (Vaya, 1976)
- Orquesta Broadway, Paraiso (Coco, 1981)
- Louie Ramirez, Louie Ramirez Y Sus Amigos (Cotique, 1978)
- Louie Ramirez, Salsero (Cotique, 1980)
- Hector Ramos, Para Todo El Mundo 7th (Galaxy, 1983)
- Johnny Rodriguez, El Encuentro (Lo Mejor, 1982)
- Jimmy Sabater, Solo (Tico, 1969)
- Jimmy Sabater, Gusto (Fania, 1980)
- Daniel Santos, Daniel Santos Con El Conjunto Clasico (Velvet, 1985)
- Janis Siegel, Experiment in White (Wounded Bird, 2002)
- Los Tres, Los Tres (Polydor, 1983)
