= José Alberto "El Canario" =

Dominican salsa singer (born 1958)

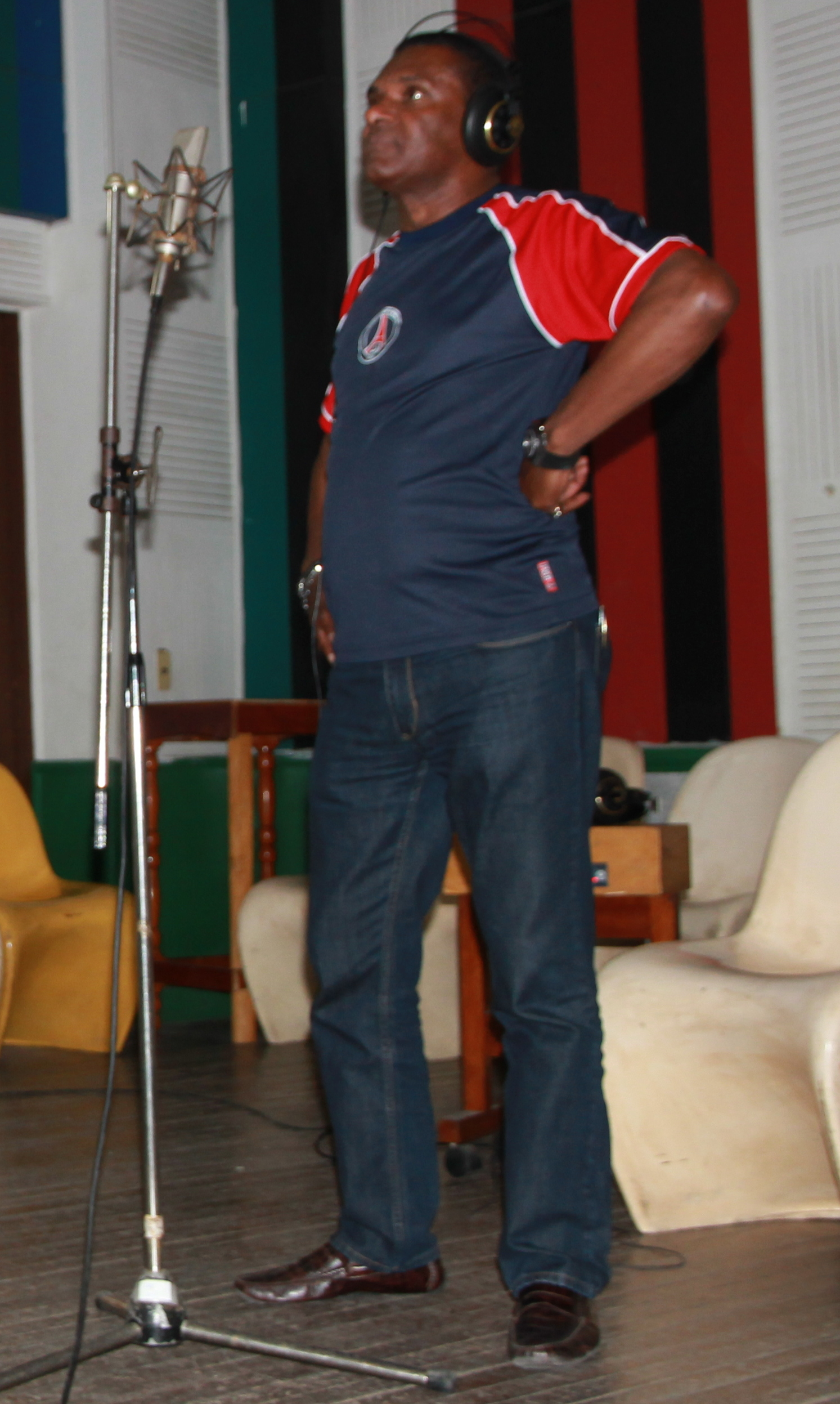
- José Alberto in 2014

Background information
- Also known as: El Canario
- Born: José Alberto Justiniano; 22 December 1958 (age 67); Villa Consuelo, Santo Domingo, Dominican Republic
- Genres: Salsa
- Occupation: Singer-songwriter
- Instruments: Singing, whistling
- Years active: 1975–present
- Label: Pina Records

José Alberto Justiniano (born 22 December 1958, in Villa Consuelo, Santo Domingo, Dominican Republic), better known by his stage name José Alberto "El Canario", is a salsa singer from the Dominican Republic. José Alberto moved to Puerto Rico with his family at the age of seven, and inspired by his rich Dominican culture went on to polish his singing at Las Antillas Military Academy. He relocated to New York in the early 1970s and sang with several orchestras. He received international attention as the singer of Típica 73 in October 1977.

== Career ==
José Alberto started his own band in 1983, and became a major Latin star after the release of his 1984 debut Noches Calientes. His 1991 album Dance With Me, which established a new style of salsa called salsa romántica. He has sung hit songs such as "Sueño Contigo" and "Disculpeme Señora". His voice was widely adored by his fans, and his exceptional whistling abilities (being able to improvise as if he was playing a traverse flute) led them to give him the nickname El Canario ("The Canary").

El Canario has enjoyed success in the United States and Europe, but especially throughout Latin America, including in his native Dominican Republic, Puerto Rico, Peru, Venezuela, Panama, and Ecuador. In 1999, he was part of the biggest Latin American festival in Australian history at The Bacardi Darling Harbor Latin American Festival in Sydney, as supporting act for salsa performer Celia Cruz with over 22,000 people in attendance.

On 24 May 2008, José Alberto celebrated 30 years in the music industry at the United Palace Theater in New York City. Among the several special guests were Oscar D'León, Ismael Miranda, Raulín Rosendo, Joe Arroyo, and Latin music mogul Ralph Mercado.

In 15 September 2022, José Alberto "El Canario", 44+ years in the music industry, was the featured guest on Norberto Vélez's YouTube channel titled "Sesiones Desde La Loma Ep. 31".
