= Alfredo de la Fé =

Cuban violinist (born 1954)

Alfredo de la Fe
- Born: Alfredo Manuel de la Fe Díaz; February 6, 1954 (age 72); Havana, Cuba
- Genres: Salsa, Latin jazz
- Occupations: violinist, producer, composer, actor
- Instrument: Violin
- Years active: 1960s–present
- Website: www.alfredodelafeviolin.com

Alfredo Manuel de la Fe Díaz (born February 6, 1954) is a Cuban-born and New York–based violinist who lived in Colombia for more than 16 years and is responsible for adapting the violin to Colombian traditional dance music creating innovative Salsa and Latin American music. The first solo violinist to perform with a Salsa orchestra, De la Fe has toured the world more than thirty times, appearing in concert and participating in over 100 albums by top Latin artists, including Eddie Palmieri, Tito Puente, Celia Cruz, José Alberto "El Canario", Cheo Feliciano, The Fania All-Stars, Santana and Larry Harlow. His second solo album entitled Alfredo released in 1979 was a Grammy nominee for "Best Latin album".

A child prodigy, Alfredo's father who was a singer (a tenor of opera) in Havana, Cuba and sang on Cuban radio with Bienvenido León and Celia Cruz in the 1940s recognized his son's skills and encouraged his musical talent.

== Early life ==
He was born in Havana, Cuba, to a family of musicians. De la Fe began studying violin at the Amadeo Roldán Conservatory in Havana in 1962. In 1964, he received a scholarship to attend the Warsaw Conservatory in Poland. In 1965, he performed compositions by Mendelssohn and Tchaikovsky with the Metropolitan Opera Orchestra in Carnegie Hall. A scholarship to Juilliard Arts enabled him to further his studies. De la Fe launched his professional career, at the age of 12, when he switched from classical music to salsa and accepted an invitation to join charanga musician José Fajardo's orchestra in 1966.

== Career ==
In 1972, he joined Eddie Palmieri's orchestra. He remained with the group for five years, moving temporarily to San Francisco where he joined Santana in 1976. Returning to New York, De La Fé joined Típica 73 in 1977. Two years later, he released his debut solo album, Alfredo, and was nominated for three Grammy Awards. His song, "Hot to Trot", appeared in the top 50 in the US.

In 1980, De La Fé signed with Sars All Stars, and produced thirty-two albums for the Latin record label. His second solo album, Charanga '80, was released the same year. In 1981, De La Fé became musical director of Tito Puente's Latin Percussion Jazz Ensemble. In 1981 he resumed his solo career, signing with Taboga, for whom he recorded the album Triunfo. Relocating to Colombia in 1983, De La Fé signed with Philips and released three albums – Made in Colombia, Dancing in the Tropics and Alfredo De La Fé Vallenato – by the end of the 1980s. In 1989, De La Fé switched to the Fuentes label. In 1991 he toured Europe playing in Geneva, Paris and Rome and met Eddie Palmieri. In 1991, he also participated in a Colombian soap opera Azucar. Although he joined the Fania All-Stars in 1995, De La Fé continued to pursue a solo career. He signed with Sony Music in 1997. Two years later, he toured with his own band, appearing at festivals in Denmark, Holland, France, Turkey and Belgium, and reunited with Eddie Palmieri's Orchestra for a European tour.

In 2002, after several years in Europe, he moved back to New York and toured the US with his New York band, led by pianist Israel Tanenbaum. Other musicians included bass player Maximo Rodriguez, percussionists Tony Escapa and Little Johnny Rivero, flute player Andrea Brachfeld.

== Discography ==
Solo albums

- 1979: "Alfredo"
- 1980: "Alfredo De La Fé y la charanga 1980"
- 1981: "Para África con amor"
- 1982: "Triunfo"
- 1984: "Made in Colombia"
- 1985: "Alfredo De La Fé Vallenato"
- 1990: "Salsa"
- 1990: "Los violines de Alfredo De La Fé"
- 1992: "Los violines de Alfredo De La Fé vol. 2: Sentir de Cuba".
- 1993: "Con toda la salsa Alfredo De La Fé"
- 1995: "La Salsa de Los Dioses"
- 1997: "De la Fé y Aché. Pa´ Rafael"
- 2000: "Latitudes"
- 2006: "Alfredo De La Fé y Fruko (La Llave de Oro)"
- 2013 : "Alfredo De La Fe y Rodry Go(Sin Límites)"
- 2017 : "Alfredo De La Fe y Poncho Zuleta, Iván Villazón, Silvio Brito, Ivo Díaz y Jorge Luís Montaño.(Homenaje al Vallenato)"
- 2017 : "Alfredo De La Fe y Rodry Go & B-Clip(Melao, Salsa electrónica)"
- 2019 : "Alfredo De La Fe y B-Clip(Jazz Eléctronico)"
- 2020 : "Alfredo De La Fe y Checo Acosta, Fausto Chatella e Iván Villazón(Barranquilla tiene Fé)"
- 2022 : "Alfredo De La Fe y Gilberto SantaRosa, Alexander Abreu, Jose Alberto"El canario", etc(Legado)"

Guest artist on other productions

- 1973: "The Sun Of Latin Music" by Eddie Palmieri & Friends Con Lalo Rodriguez
- 1976: "De Ti Depende" by Hector Lavoe
- 1977: "Selecciones Clásicas" by José Fajardo
- 1977: "El Baquine de Angelitos Negros" by Willie Colon
- 1978: "Comedia" by Hector Lavoe
- 1979: "Típica 73 en Cuba - Intercambio Cultural" by Típica 73
- 1979: "I Need You" by Sylvester
- 1980: "Charangueando con la Típica 73" by Típica 73
- 1980: "Señor Charanga" by José Fajardo
- 1982: "On Broadway" by Tito Puento
- 1997: "Bravo" by Fania All-Stars
- 2001: "Diferente" by Jose Alberto (El Canario)
- 2003: "El Gran Combo Remix"
- 2003: "Celia Cruz Telemundo Special"
- 2011: "El Ultimo Mambo, Israel Lopes Cachao"
- 2017: "Sabiduría"
- 2020: "Grupo Niche 40"

Sountracks for movies and TV series

- 1980: "The Shining" Song with Lalo Schifrin.
- 1996: "Oro". All episodes.
- 1997: "Otra en Mí". All episodes.
- 2014: "La Muerte del Gato". Vilaplana Films.
- 2015: "Celia Cruz T.V series. All episodes. FOX TELECOLOMBIA
- 2016: "Dancing with the Stars - Colombia". All episodes.
- 2017: "Paquita La Del Barrio". All episodes. Grupo Imagen Producciones.
- 2018: "Nadie me quita lo Bailao". All episodes. FOX TELECOLOMBIA.
- 2018: "Jose Jose: El Principe de la Canción". Nine episodes. TELEMUNDO
- 2018: "Ponedores". Vilaplana Films.
- 2019: "La Gloria de Lucho" All episodes. CARACOL INTERNACIONAL.
- 2021: "Queen of the South". S5|E5|Más dinero mas problemas. Song: "Asómate a la Ventana". USA Network.
- 2022: "Snowpiercer". S3|E7|Ouroboros. Song: "Hilda". NETFLIX.
- 2023: "Plantadas". Shango Productions.

== Congos de Oro ==
Otorgado en el Festival de Orquestas del Carnaval de Barranquilla:

Año	Trabajo nominado	Categoría	Resultado
1990	Alfredo de la Fe	Mejor Artista Solista	Ganador

== Congos de Oro ==
Otorgado en el Festival de Orquestas del Carnaval de Barranquilla:

Año	Trabajo nominado	Categoría	Resultado
2021	Alfredo de la Fe	Premio trayectoria Artística	Ganador
