= Camilo Azuquita =

Panamanian singer and composer (1946–2022)

- Born: Luis Argúmedez Berguido; 18 February 1946; Colón, Panama
- Died: 25 December 2022 (aged 76) Panama City, Panama
- Genres: Bolero, Guaguancó
- Occupation(s): Singer, composer
- Years active: 1961–2022

Luis Camilo Argúmedez Berguido, known by his stage name Camilo Azuquita, (18 February 1946 – 25 December 2022) was a Panamanian singer and composer. He was one of the key promoters of salsa music in Panama.

== Biography ==
Luis Camilo Argumédez Berguido was born in Colón on 18 February 1946. In the early 1960s, he began singing in the bolero and guaguancó genres. His delicate voice gave rise to his stage name, Azuquita. He twice participated in amateur song contests with RPC Radio, the second of which he was victorious in. From 1966 to 1969, he collaborated with artists such as Roberto Roena, Ismael Rivera, and Rafael Cortijo. In 1969, Azuquita joined the Cuban band Sonora Matancera before creating his own group, Azuquita y su Melao, in 1974. After a series of concerts in California, he released an album with the group Fania All-Stars. In 1979, he appeared in the Guinness Book of World Records after gaining international recognition for bringing salsa music to Europe. He was also awarded a Latin Grammy Award.

Azuquita died in Panama City on 25 December 2022, at the age of 76.

== Discography ==
- Enrique Lynch (Sono Radio Peru 12220) (1964)
- Roberto Roena y sus Megatones - Se Pone Bueno / It Gets Better (1966)
- Kako & His Orchestra - Live It Up (1967)
- Rafael Cortijo Y Su Bonche - ¡Ahí Na Má! / Put It There (1969)
- Azuquita - Aquí Esta Azuquita (1970)
- The Salsa All Stars (1972)
- Azuquita y su Melao - Salsa en Hollywood (1974)
- Azuquita y su Orquesta Melao - Pura Salsa (1975)
- Kako y Azuquita - Unión Dinámica (1976)
- Típica ’73 - The Two Sides of Típica '73 (1977)
- Típica ’73 - Salsa Encendida (1978)
- Louie Ramirez Y Sus Amigos (1978)
- Azuquita y su Melao - Llegó Y Dijo (1979)
- Azuquita y su Melao - Salsa En Vivo (1980)
- Tito Puente And His Orchestra – Ce' Magnifique (1981)
- Azuquita y su Melao – Salsa International 83 (1983)
- Orquesta Felicidad, Camilo Azuquita – 2 Campeones: Roberto Duran Vs Camilo Azuquita (1984)
- Camilo Azuquita – Azúcar A Granel (1988)
- Camilo Azuquita – Amantes Secretos (1989)
- Camilo Azuquita – El Señor De La Salsa (1992)
- Azuquita – La Foule Salsa International (1994)
- Azuquita y Papo Lucca – Los Originales (1996)
- Azuquita – Lo Bailado Nadie Me Lo Quita (Melao) CD Format (1999)
- Azuquita y su Melao – La Salsa, C´est Pas Compliqué (2000)
- Azuquita and Los Jubilados en Santiago de Cuba – Cuba Son (2001)
- Azuquita – Baila Para Mí (2005)
- Orquesta Abran Paso – Back to the 70's (2015)
