= Rumba (disambiguation) =

Rumba is the name of several music styles of Cuban origin.

Rumba may also refer to:

== Dance and music ==
=== Genres ===
- Cuban rumba, a traditional Cuban music genre
- Galician rumba, a music genre of Galicia, Spain, influenced by Cuban music
- Rhumba, also known as ballroom rumba, an American style of ballroom music
- Rumba flamenca, a style of flamenco
- Catalan rumba, a Spanish popular music style
- Rumba criolla, a genre of Colombian popular music
- Congolese rumba, a genre of music that originated in the Congo Basin during the 1940s

=== Instruments ===
- Rumba shakers, better known as maracas
- Rumba box, better known as marímbula

=== Albums ===
- The Rumba Foundation, an album by Jesse Cook, 2009

=== Songs ===
- "Rumba" (song), 2015 song by Anahí
- Rumba, composition for harp by Carlos Salzedo (1885–1961)
- Rumba, composition for guitar by Manuel María Ponce (1882–1948)
- "Rumba", a song by Ill Niño from Revolution Revolución, 2001

== Film ==
- Rumberas film, Mexican film genre
- Rumba (1935 film), 1935 musical drama film starring George Raft and Carole Lombard
- Rumba (2008 film), 2008 comedy film starring Dominique Abel and Fiona Gordon

== People ==
- Alberts Rumba (1892–1962), Latvian speed skater
- Nima Rumba (born 1974), Nepalese pop singer
- Rumba Munthali (born 1978), Canadian soccer player

== Places ==
- Rumba, Estonia, a village in Estonia
- Rumba parish, a parish in Latvia

== Other uses ==
- Rumba, an ESA satellite in the Cluster II mission
- RUMBA, software product
- One of three flavors named after dances (Rumba, Samba, Tango) of Rumba Juice energy drink distributed by Hansen Beverage Company
- Rumba (sculpture), a sculpture in Helsinki, Finland
- Rumba (magazine), a Finnish music magazine

== See also ==
- Roomba, autonomous robotic vacuum cleaner sold by iRobot
