= Alberto Zayas =

- Birth name: Alberto Zayas Govín
- Also known as: El Melodioso
- Born: February 14, 1908; Pueblo Nuevo, Matanzas, Cuba
- Died: 1983 (aged 74–75); Guanabacoa, Havana, Cuba
- Genres: Guaguancó (Cuban rumba), conga, Santería music, Abakuá music, son cubano
- Occupation(s): Musician, songwriter
- Instrument(s): Vocals, Afro-Cuban percussion
- Years active: 1922–1983
- Labels: Panart, Impresora Cubana de Discos
- Formerly of: Grupo Afrocubano Lulú Yonkori

Alberto Zayas Govín (Note: He is mistakenly referred to as Alfredo or Alfredito Zayas in some accounts and releases.) (February 14, 1908 – 1983) was a Cuban rumba singer and songwriter who founded one of the first recorded rumba ensembles, Grupo Afrocubano Lulú Yonkori. He is considered one of the most important guaguancó vocalists/composers in the history of rumba.

== Life and career ==
Alberto Zayas Govín was born in the Pueblo Nuevo neighborhood of Matanzas on February 14, 1908. When he was one year old, his family moved to Havana. At age 14, he lived in El Cerro district of Havana and sang in coros de clave, the precursor ensembles of the guaguancó. There, he earned the nickname "El Melodioso" (The Melodious One). In 1925, he moved to Guanabacoa, another district of Havana. According to several accounts, Zayas played with several son ensembles such as Sexteto Habanero and Sexteto Boloña, before focusing on rumba and other Afro-Cuban genres.

Zayas became a collaborator of ethnomusicologist Fernando Ortiz, and in 1941, he invited anthropologist Harold Courlander to an Abakuá ceremony in Guanabacoa. This meeting yielded part of the 10 hours of recorded material that are kept at the Archives of Traditional Music (Indiana University), some of which were released by Folkways Records in 1951 under the title Cult Music of Cuba.

The first folkloric guaguancó to get popular through jukebox recordings was "El vive bien" by the conjunto of Alberto Zayas, based in Guanabacoa. This recording and the consumer interest that it generated led to the national promotion of the Grupo Guaguancó Matancero, later known as the Muñequitos de Matanzas.

— Robin Moore, University of Texas

During the 1950s, his ensemble, Grupo Afrocubano Lulú Yonkori, featured lead singers Roberto Maza and Carlos Embale, backing vocalists Adriano Rodríguez, Bienvenido León, Mercedes Romay and Juanita Romay, and percussionists Giraldo Rodríguez and Gerardo Valdés among others. They recorded four LPs for Panart, which have been called "some of the first authentic rumba recordings in Cuban history" by ethnomusicologist Ivor Miller (University of Calabar). The first one was Guaguancó afro-cubano (1956), which featured the hit "El vive bien", penned by Zayas. It was followed by El guaguansón (1957), credited to "Alfredito Zayas y su Grupo Folklórico". The next record was Afro-frenetic. Tambores de Cuba (1958), and in July 1959 the band released a conga album Congas y comparsas del carnaval habanero (Side-B included recordings by Carlos Barbería). In 1961, Impresora Cubana de Discos released two tracks by Zayas' ensemble with Pacho Alonso on lead vocals.

Zayas would continue his career in theatre shows and radio broadcasts, and he toured abroad as director of the Grupo Folklórico Cubano. Zayas died in 1983 in Guanabacoa.

== Discography ==
=== Albums ===
- 1956: Guaguancó afro-cubano (Panart)
- 1957: El guaguansón (Panart)
- 1958: Afro-frenetic. Tambores de Cuba (Panart)
  - 1959: Hi-Fi Cuban Drums (reissue, Capitol)
- 1959: Congas y comparsas del carnaval habanero (Panart)
- 2001: El yambú de los barrios (compilation, Tumbao Cuban Classics)

=== Singles ===
- 1955: El vive bien / Congo mulenze (Panart)
- 1956: La chapalera / Que me critiquen (Panart)
- 1956: Se corrió la cocinera / Tata Perico (Panart)
- 1956: Una rumba en la bodega / El yambú de los barrios (Panart)
- 1956: Ya no tengo amigos / A mi no me tocan campana (Panart)
