= Abakwa =

Abakwa may refer to:

- Bamenda, a city in Cameroon
- Abakuá, a secret society with roots in eastern Nigeria, and the style of music played by its members
