= Gregorio Hernández =

Gregorio Hernández may refer to:

- José Gregorio Hernández (1864–1919), Venezuelan physician
- Gregorio Hernández de Alba (1904–1973), Colombian archeologist (es)
- Gregorio Hernández Ríos "El Goyo" (1936–2012), Cuban rumba musician
- Gregorio Hernández de Velasco (1525–1586), Spanist humanist (es)
- Gregorio Cárdenas Hernández "Goyo" (1915–1999), Mexican serial killer
- Gregorio Hernández (athlete), Cuban triple jumper at the 1990 Goodwill Games
- Gregorio Hernández Jr., Secretary of Education (Philippines) (1954–1957)

== See also ==
- Gregorio Fernández, Spanish Baroque sculptor
