= Erikundi =

Percussion instrument

Percussion instrument
- Classification: idiophone

Related instruments
- caxixi in Brazil

The erikundi is a percussive instrument that is shaken much like a maraca. Unlike the maraca, however, it is made from other materials, causing a different sound to be heard. The Erikundi is also related to the Abakua cult, an Afro-Cuban Secret Society, and the playing of it may indicate an individual’s solidarity to this society. Additionally the diversity of this instrument and its use is illustrated by its use in popular music ensembles such as Vieja Trova.

== Description ==
They are typically made of woven reed or grass with a leather or gourd shell bottom. The erikundi are shaken by the handle, allowing whatever hard objects inside to hit the walls of the container. They are usually seen used in pairs.

== Use ==
The erikundi is used as percussion in music as well as for spiritual/religious purposes. It is an object that is commonly associated with worship rituals having to do with power. They are used in the ceremony Ekoria Itia Abakuá, meaning a new birth or consecration of power. This tradition is normally seen in the cities Havana, Matanzas and Cárdenas in Cuba. The erikundi is also a common instrument used in the Cuban Rumba.

== Images (external links) ==
- Photo of an Erikundi
- Photo 2 of an Erikundi

== See also ==
- Cuban Rumba
