= Yambu (disambiguation) =

Yambu may refer to:

- Yanbu, a city and governorate in Saudi Arabia
- Sycee, Chinese silver ingots, also known as yambu
- Yambú, a form of Cuban rumba
