= Malanga (dancer) =

Cuban rumba dancer (1885–1927)

- Born: José Rosario Oviedo; October 5, 1885; Alacranes, Unión de Reyes, Matanzas, Cuba
- Died: 1927 (aged 41–42); Morón, Cuba
- Occupation: Cuban rumba dancer

José Rosario Oviedo (October 5, 1885 – 1927), better known as Malanga, was a Cuban rumba dancer. He is considered one of the most famous columbia dancers and his mysterious death has been the subject of numerous essays, poems and songs, most notably "Malanga murió", written by Faustino Drake and performed by Arsenio Rodríguez amongst others.

== Life and career ==
=== Early life ===
José Rosario Oviedo was born on October 5, 1885, in "La Esperanza", an ingenio near the village of Alacranes in the Unión de Reyes municipality, Matanzas Province, Cuba. (Note: In the past, some researchers believed he had been born in Sabanilla del Encomendador, a nearby village now known as Juan Gualberto Gómez. However, this has been shown to be false.) He was baptisted on November 29 as the son of an "unknown father". His mother, Funciana Oviedo, was an ex-slave and raised him in the town of Unión de Reyes after living in several ingenios such as "Majagua" and "San Gonzalo". His godmother Saturnina Oviedo and his grandfather (also his godfather) José Quintero played an important role in his upbringing. Despite being christened in the Catholic faith, Malanga became a Santería practitioner; his orisha was Ochosí. He soon became a talented rumba dancer, performing with a group which featured Ángel Timbo, Ángel Calazán, Faustino Drake and Donato Torres. The percussionists played cajones, wooden boxes that preceded the conga drum.

=== Style and professional career ===
Malanga's style of dancing was unlike that of his contemporaries. He danced on his tiptoes, like ballet dancers, and often danced "on top of a dining room table with a glass of water on his head, making all the movements of the dance or picking up a handkerchief off the floor without spilling the water". According to famous tres player Isaac Oviedo, "he moved blindfolded with a glass of water on his head (...) without ever losing his step or the rhythm".

Apart from being a dancer, Malanga worked as a representative for the Partido Liberal in Unión de Reyes, and as a sugar cane cutter, especially in the 1910s and 1920s, when work opportunities decreased in the region. During the zafra season he had to migrate to the "sugar triangle" towns of Florida, Morón and Ciego de Ávila.

=== Death ===
In the summer of 1927, when returning alone from Morón, Malanga died in unexplained circumstances. (Note: He is often incorrectly said to have died in 1923, a year cited from Helio Orovio's 1994 work Música por el Caribe.) The most popular account of Malanga's death has been given by Crescencio Hernández "Chencho", according to whom Malanga was murdered with broken glass hidden in his food at a dance contest in Ceballos, near Morón. However, this modus operandi has generally been debunked. No death certificate had been found, and the location of his grave remains unknown.

== In popular culture ==
Together with others such as Mulense, Chenche and Tanganica, Malanga is one of Cuba's "legendary rumberos", being remembered as one of the most notable rumba dancers, especially in the columbia style. As a result, his life and especially his death have been the subject of many works, from essays to poems and songs. Cuban poet Fernando García González wrote a poem in 1985 dedicated to Malanga entitled "Canto al Rumbero Mayor".

Cajón de quinto drummer Faustino Drake, one of Malanga's dearest friends, composed the song "Malanga murió", also known as "A Malanga" in 1927 as an elegy. It is one of the most popular guaguancós and its tone is remarkably solemn, as summarized by its well-known chorus: "Unión de Reyes llora / porque Malanga murió" (Unión de Reyes cries / because Malanga died). The song was originally sung by Roncona and later recorded by Arsenio Rodríguez as "Llora timbero" in 1941.

== See also ==
- List of unsolved deaths
