= Gregorio Hernández Ríos =

El Goyo
- Birth name: Gregorio Hernández Ríos
- Born: 17 November 1936; Pinar del Río, Cuba
- Died: 8 January 2012 (aged 75); Havana, Cuba
- Genres: Rumba, Santería, Abakuá, Palo
- Occupation(s): Musician, dancer, educator
- Instrument(s): Vocals, claves, conga
- Years active: c. 1960–2012
- Labels: EGREM, Bis, Soul Jazz

Gregorio Hernández Ríos (17 November 1936 – 8 January 2012), known as El Goyo, was a Cuban rumba singer, dancer and percussionist. A founding member of the Conjunto Folklórico Nacional, he was also the leader of a Santería music ensemble, Grupo Oba-Ilú. He toured Europe and Latin America with various ensembles and recorded with Tata Güines, Alfredo Rodríguez and Jane Bunnett, among others. For the collaborative album La rumba soy yo he received the Latin Grammy Award in 2001. His album La rumba es cubana was nominated to the 2003 Premio Cubadisco in the Best Folk Album and Best Design categories, winning the latter. He has been described as one of the most important rumberos of contemporary Havana.

El Goyo was also a teacher at the Instituto Superior de Arte, where he taught Afro-Cuban music. He was the director of the Cuban Society of Percussionists (PERCUBA) for fifteen years. Despite his academic commitments, he still performed as a street musician in the solares of Havana until his death.

== Biography ==
Born in the Pinar del Río Province, but registered in the Havana census, on 17 November 1936, El Goyo—as he was always known—began his career as a singer and dancer from a very young age. He accompanied his father as pregonero and later joined various dance ensembles. His big break came in 1962, when he was accepted into the Conjunto Folklórico Nacional, a new ensemble organised by the government to preserve Cuba's cultural traditions and to present them abroad. He also became an educator at the Instituto Superior de Arte in Havana.

By the 1990s, el Goyo was one of Havana's most prominent rumberos and he began to collaborate on numerous recordings with artists such as Tata Güines, Alfredo Rodríguez (in Paris) and Jane Bunnett. In 2000, he recorded an album dedicated to the history of rumba entitled La rumba es cubana, which was nominated to the Cubadisco awards two years later. Also in 2000, he organised the recording La rumba soy yo, a similarly themed album featuring a different lineup on each song. The success of the album, which won the 2001 Latin Grammy Award for Best Folk Album, spurred the recording of a sequel. El Goyo continued to work as an educator at the Instituto Superior de Arte until his death in 2012.

== Discography ==
Solo albums

- 2000: La rumba es cubana (Unicornio)

Collaborative albums

- 1995: Rapsodia rumbera (EGREM)
- 2000: La rumba soy yo (Bis)
- 2004: La rumba soy yo II (Bis)

With Grupo Obá-Ilú

- 1998: Santería (Soul Jazz)

As guest vocalist

- 1995: Tata Güines – Aniversario (EGREM)
- 1996: Jane Bunnett – Chamalongo (Blue Note)
- 1997: Alfredo Rodríguez – Cuba linda (Rykodisc)
- 1998: Pedro Luis Martínez – Havana Jam (PM)
- 2006: Conjunto Biankomeko – Antología de la música afrocubana Vol. X: Abakuá (EGREM)
