= Galician rumba =

Music genre from Galicia, Spain

Galician rumba (rumba gallega) belongs to those songs and dances called cantes de ida y vuelta, "of departure and return", like the Habanera, that travelled back from Cuba to the Spanish motherland to establish themselves as musical genres cultivated and cherished by the Spanish population.

Like the rumba flamenca, the Galician rumba originated from a fusion of certain Cuban and Spanish elements of style. The characteristics of that new genre are similar to those of the new song-dances that appeared in the Caribbean Basin area during the 19th century, which were the result of a combination of Iberian and African elements. This new musical style has been called by Armando Rodríguez Ruidíaz the Rumba prototype and defined as follows: “That original product, which we can call the Rumba prototype, was the result of a process of cultural fusion, in which certain European components, such as the lyrics, the tonal relationships (Major-Minor), the melodic and harmonic structures and the “quatrain-refrain” (copla-estribillo) form, were combined with syncopated rhythmic patterns and micro-metric fluctuations (micro time) of African origin.”

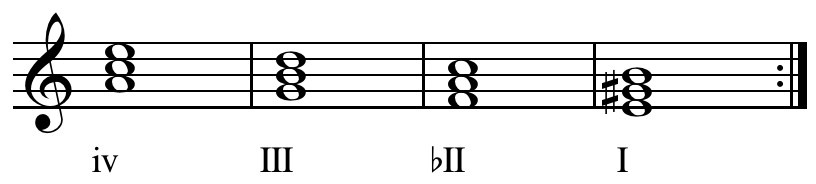
Andalusian cadence in E Phrygian.

Also like in the rumba flamenca, the melody in the rumba gallega is frequently based on the Spanish Andalusian cadence, while in the background it generally utilizes one or several rhythms which are characteristic of some Cuban music genres such as the guaracha, the rumba and the habanera.

== Origin ==
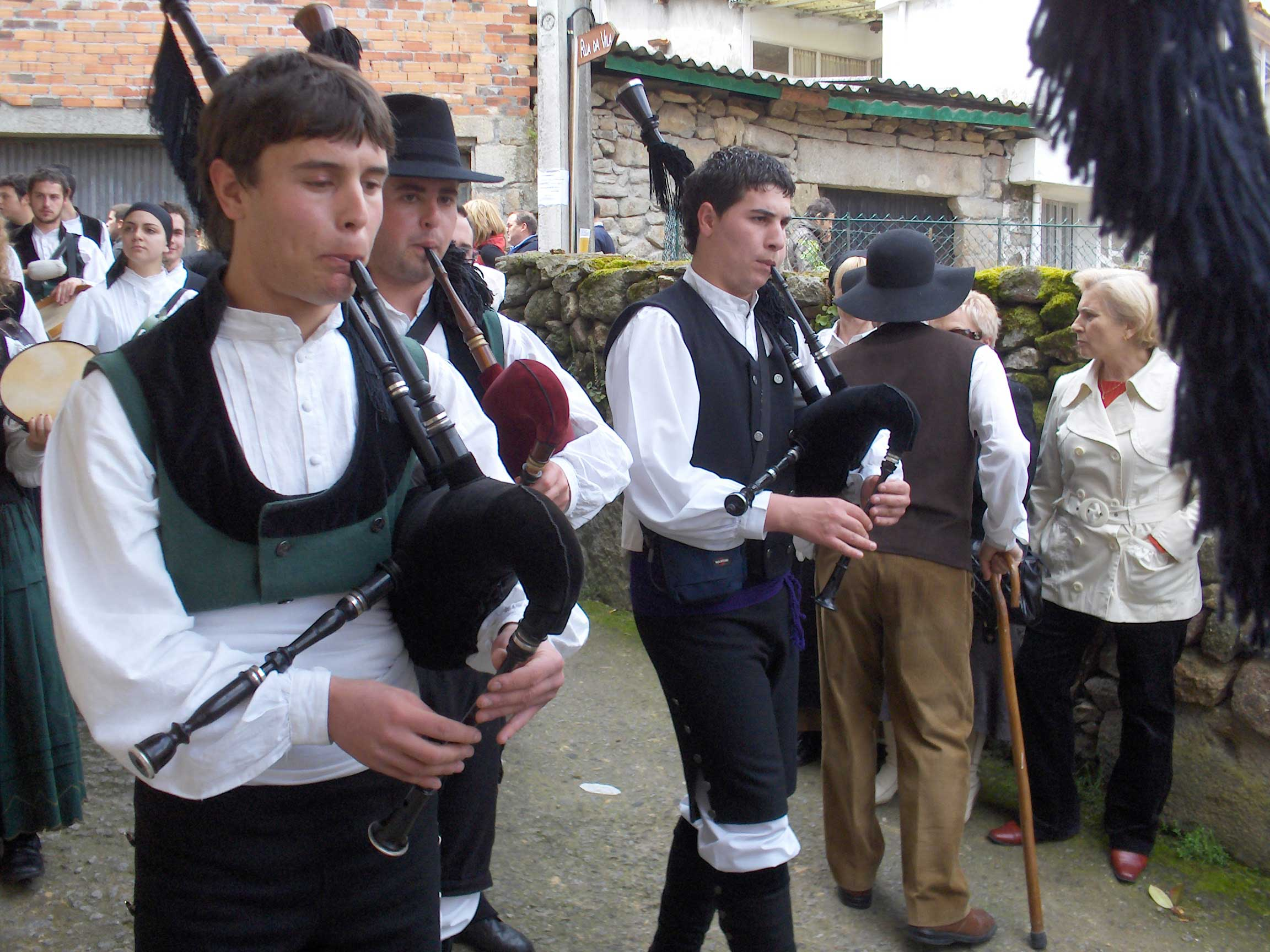
Galician bagpipers gaiteiros in a romería.

According to Miguel Pérez Lorenzo, there are testimonies about the inclusion of the “Rumba” in the Galician bagpipe’s (gaita) repertoire since the 19th century. He also says in reference to the bagpiper from Ourense, Xoán Ferreiro: “He played, we imagine, those pieces that he heard from his father, other bagpipers, and the band… Jerónimo (father of this bagpiper, who passed away in 1940) emigrated to Cuba, where he lived until five years before his death… those years in Cuba served him to include “rumbas and “boleros” in his repertoire… which now Don Xoán plays. With the exception of the processional pieces that Don Xoán used to play; sometime in the mass and other times walking behind the “Saint” in the procession, the rest was mainly for the people to dance in the fests and romerías.

== Diversification and popularization ==
Due to its popular origin the “Galician Rumbas” are frequently attributed to unknown authors; and in a similar way as the Muiñeira and other traditional genres, they are named after the town or region where they were collected, like: Rumba de Eo, Rumba de Mallou, Rumba de Cerqueira, Rumba de Anxeriz or Rumba de Vergara. They are also titled after the name of the author, if it happens to be known, or after the person to whom they have been dedicated, as for example: Rumba de Juanito do Carballal, Rumba de Pucho, or Rumba Sabeliña.

The introduction of the rumba in Galicia is closely related to the creation, during the first half of the 20th century, of musical groups called “charangas” o “murgas”. Those groups, differently from traditional Galician ensembles such as those comprised by tambourines or by bagpipes and percussion, included other instruments like the clarinet, the saxophone, the accordion, and the guitar, as well as an ample selection of percussion instruments.

Most recently, some recordings of Rumbas gallegas in which the Cuban rhythmic component is highlighted have been produced in Galicia. We can point out, among others, a version of the “Rumba dos cinco marinheiros” by the renowned group Muxicas., where we can perceive the well known “clave cubana” rhythm in the instrumental background. We should also mention a recording of the same piece by the bagpiper Carlos Núñez Muñoz and the legendary Irish group “The Chieftains,” accompanied by an autochthonous Cuban musical ensemble.
