= Cuban rumba =

Music genre originating from Cuba

Rumba
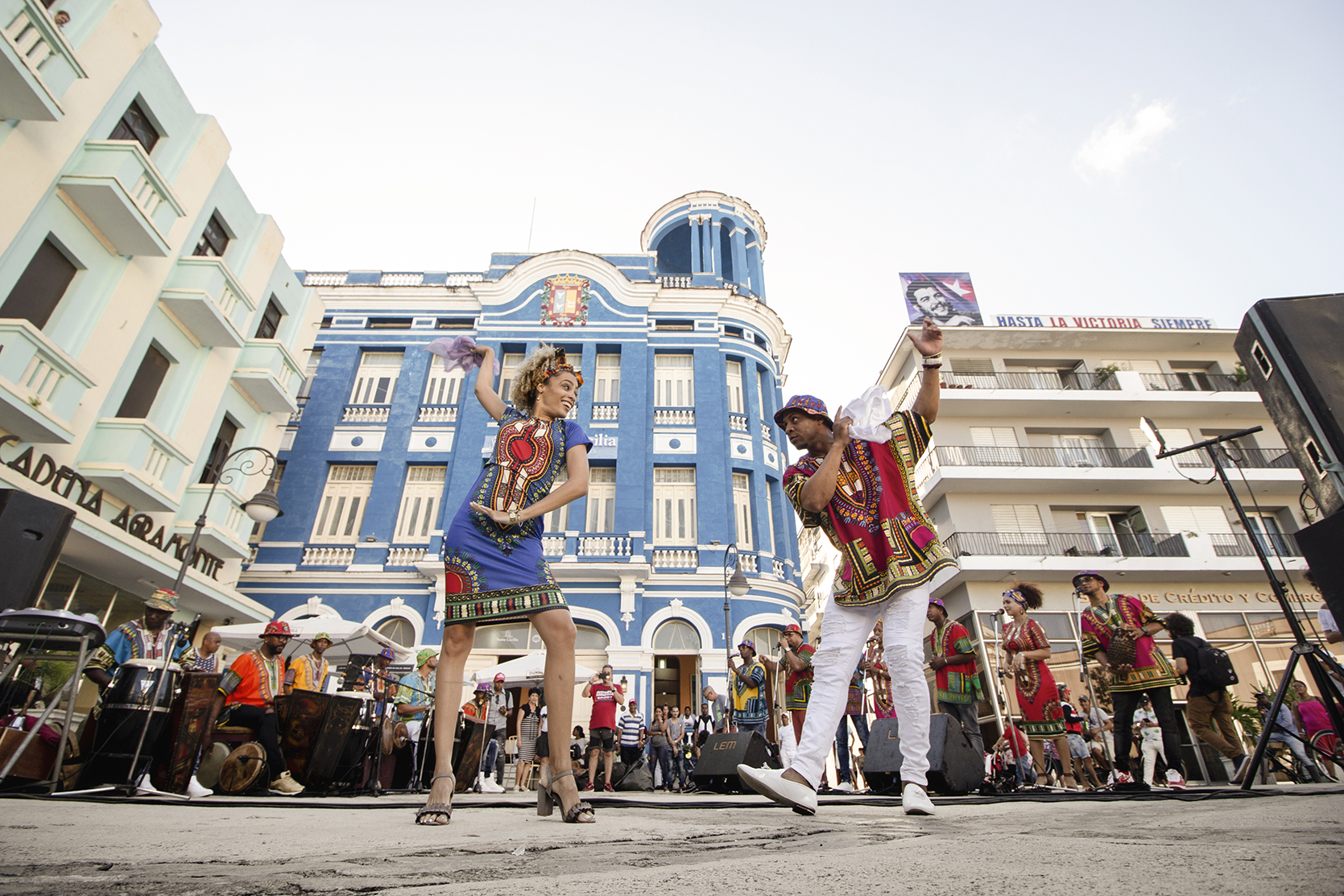
- Stylistic origins: Abakuá and yuka dance and drumming, Spanish-based coros de clave
- Cultural origins: Late 19th century in northern Cuba
- Typical instruments: Tumbadoras, quinto, claves, guagua, palitos, chekeré, cajones
- Derivative forms: Rumba flamenca

Subgenres
- yambú; columbia; guaguancó; guarapachangueo; batá-rumba

Regional scenes
- Matanzas, Havana

Rumba is a secular genre of Cuban music involving dance, percussion, and song. It originated in the northern regions of Cuba, mainly in urban Havana and Matanzas, during the late 19th century. It is based on African music and dance traditions, namely Abakuá and yuka, as well as the Spanish-based coros de clave. According to Argeliers León, rumba is one of the major "genre complexes" of Cuban music, and the term rumba complex is now commonly used by musicologists. This complex encompasses the three traditional forms of rumba (yambú, guaguancó and columbia), as well as their contemporary derivatives and other minor styles.

Traditionally performed by poor workers of African descent in streets and solares (courtyards), rumba remains one of Cuba's most characteristic forms of music and dance. Vocal improvisation, elaborate dancing and polyrhythmic drumming are the key components of all rumba styles. Cajones (wooden boxes) were used as drums until the early 20th century, when they were replaced by tumbadoras (conga drums). During the genre's recorded history, which began in the 1940s, there have been numerous successful rumba bands such as Los Papines, Los Muñequitos de Matanzas, Clave y Guaguancó, AfroCuba de Matanzas and Yoruba Andabo.

Since its early days, the genre's popularity has been largely confined to Cuba, although its legacy has reached well beyond the island. In the United States, it gave its name to the so-called "ballroom rumba", or rhumba, and in Africa, soukous is commonly referred to as "Congolese rumba" (despite being actually based on son cubano). Its influence in Spain is testified by rumba flamenca and derivatives such as Catalan rumba.

== Etymology ==
According to Joan Corominas, the word derives from "rumbo", meaning "uproar" (and previously "pomp") and also "the course of a ship", which itself may derive from the word "rombo" ("rhombus"), a symbol used in compasses. In the 1978 documentary La rumba, directed by Óscar Valdés, it is stated that the term rumba originated in Spain to denote "all that is held as frivolous", deriving from the term "mujeres de rumbo".

Alternatively, in Cuba the term might have originated from a West African or Bantu language, due to its similarity to other Afro-Caribbean words such as tumba, macumba, mambo and tambó. During the 19th century in Cuba, specifically in urban Havana and Matanzas, people of African descent originally used the word rumba as a synonym for party. According to Olavo Alén, in these areas "[over time] rumba ceased to be simply another word for party and took on the meaning both of a defined Cuban musical genre and also of a very specific form of dance." The terms rumbón and rumbantela (the latter of Galician or Portuguese origin) are frequently used to denote rumba performances in the streets.

According to non-etymological sources, rumba could be related to "nkumba" meaning "navel" in Kikongo, which refers to a dance characterized by the joining and rubbing of navels. This dance was integral to the celebrations of the Kingdom of Kongo, a historical region that spanned present-day Republic of the Congo, the Democratic Republic of the Congo and Angola.

Due to its broad etymology, the term rumba historically retained a certain degree of polysemy. By the end of the 19th century, Cuban peasants (guajiros) began to perform rumbitas during their parties (guateques, changüís, parrandas and fiestas patronales). These songs were actually in the form of urban guarachas (not proper rumbas), which had a binary meter in contrast to the ternary meter of traditional rural genres such as tonada and zapateo. Similarly, in Cuban bufo theatre at the beginning of the 20th century, the guarachas that were sung at the end of the show were referred to as rumba final despite not sharing any musical similarities with actual rumba.

== Characteristics ==
=== Instrumentation ===
Rumba instrumentation has varied historically depending on the style and the availability of the instruments. The core instruments of any rumba ensemble are the claves, two hard wooden sticks that are struck against each other, and the conga drums: quinto (lead drum, highest-pitched), tres dos (middle-pitched), and tumba or salidor (lowest-pitched). Other common instruments include the catá or guagua, a wooden cylinder; the palitos, wooden sticks to strike the catá; shakers such as the chekeré and the maracas; scraper percussion instruments such as the güiro; bells, and cajones, wooden boxes that preceded the congas. During the 1940s, the genre experienced a mutual influence with son cubano, especially by Ignacio Piñeiro's Septeto Nacional and Arsenio Rodríguez's conjunto, which led to the incorporation of instruments such as the tres, the double bass, the trumpet and the piano, and the removal of idiophone instruments. At the same time, Cuban big bands, in collaboration with musical artists such as Chano Pozo, began to include authentic rumbas among their dance pieces. The group AfroCuba de Matanzas, founded in 1957, added batá drums to the traditional rumba ensemble in their style, known as batá-rumba. More recently, a cappella (vocals-only, without instruments) rumba has been performed by the Cuban ensemble Vocal Sampling, as heard in their song "Conga Yambumba".

=== Rhythm ===
Rumba clave in duple-pulse and triple-pulse structures

Although rumba is played predominantly in binary meter (duple pulse: 2/4, 4/4), triple meter (triple pulse: 9/8, 3/4) is also present. In most rumba styles, such as yambú and guaguancó, duple pulse is primary and triple-pulse is secondary. In contrast, in the rural style columbia, triple pulse is the primary structure and duple pulse is secondary. This can be explained due to the "binarization" of African-based ternary rhythms. Both the claves and the quinto (lead drum) are responsible for establishing the rhythm. Subsequently, the other instruments play their parts supporting the lead drum. Rhythmically, rumba is based on the five-stroke guide pattern called clave and the inherent structure it conveys.

=== Song structure ===
Yambú and guaguancó songs often begin with the soloist singing a melody with meaningless syllables, rather than with word-based lyrics. This introductory part is called the diana. According to Larry Crook, the diana is important because it "also contains the first choral refrain". The lead singer provides a melodic phrase or musical motive/theme for the choral sections, or they may present new but related material. Parallel harmonies are usually built above or below a melodic line, with "thirds, sixths, and octaves most common." Therefore, the singer who is singing the diana initiates the beginning of the rumba experience for the audience. The singer then improvises lyrics stating the reason for holding and performing the present rumba. This kind of improvisation is called decimar, since it is done in décimas, ten-line stanzas. Alternatively, the singer might sing an established song. Some of the most common and recognizable rumba standards are "Ave Maria Morena" (yambú), "Llora como lloré" (guaguancó), "Cuba linda, Cuba hermosa" (guaguancó), "China de oro (Laye Laye)" (columbia), and "A Malanga" (columbia).

Rumba songs consist of two main sections. The first, the canto, features the lead vocalist, performing an extended text of verses that are sometimes partially improvised. The lead singer usually plays claves. The first section may last a few minutes, until the lead vocalist signals for the other singers to repeat the short refrain of the chorus, in call and response. This second section of the song is sometimes referred to as the montuno.

== History ==
=== Syncretic origins ===
It should be mentioned at the outset that the history of rumba is filled with so many unknowns, contradictions, conjectures and myths which have, over time been taken as fact, that any definitive history of the genre is probably impossible to reconstruct. Even elders who were present at historic junctures in rumba’s development will often disagree over the critical details of its history.

— David Peñalosa

Enslaved Africans were first brought to Cuba in the 16th century by the early Spanish settlers. Due to the significance of sugar as an export during the late 18th and early 19th century, even greater numbers of people from Africa were enslaved, brought to Cuba, and forced to work on the sugar plantations. Where large populations of enslaved Africans lived, African religion, dance, and drumming were clandestinely preserved through the generations. Cultural retention among the Bantu, Yoruba, Fon (Arará), and Efik (Abakuá) had the most significant impact in western Cuba, where rumba was born. The consistent interaction of Africans and Europeans on the island brought about what today is known as Afro-Cuban culture. This is a process known as transculturation, an idea that Cuban scholar Fernando Ortiz brought to the forefront in cultural studies like Cuban Counterpoint: Tobacco and Sugar. Cuban transculturation melds Spanish culture with African cultures, as with the seamless merging found in rumba. Ortiz saw transculturation as a positive social force: "consecrating the need for mutual understanding on an objective grounding of truth to move toward achieving the definitive integrity of the nation."

Most ethnomusicologists agree that the roots of rumba can be found in the solares of Havana and Matanzas during the 1880s. The solares, also known as cuarterías, were large houses in the poor dock neighborhoods of Havana and Matanzas. Many of the important figures in the history of rumba, from Malanga to Mongo Santamaría were raised in solares. Slavery was abolished in 1886 in Cuba and first-generation of free black citizens were often called negros de nación, a term commonly found in the lyrics of rumba songs.

The earliest progenitors of the urban styles of rumba (yambú and guaguancó) might have developed during the early 19th century in slave barracks (barracones) long before the use of the term rumba as a genre became established. Such proto-rumba styles were probably instrumented with household items such as boxes and drawers instead of the congas, and frying pans, spoons and sticks instead of guaguas, palitos and claves. While these early precursors of rumba have been barely documented, the direct precursors towards the mid- and late-19th century have been widely studied. Urban rumba styles are rooted in the so-called coros de clave and coros de guaguancó, street choirs that derived from the Spanish orfeones. In addition, the widespread yuka dance and music of Congolese origin became integrated into such choirs, lending its percussion instruments and dance moves. In addition, the secret Abakuá traditions rooted in the Calabar region of West Africa that prevailed in both Havana and Matanzas also influenced the development of rumba as a syncretic genre.

=== Coros de clave ===
Coros de clave were introduced by Catalan composer Josep Anselm Clavé and became popular between the 1880s and the 1910s. They comprised as many as 150 men and women who sang in 6/8 time with European harmonies and instruments. Songs began with a female solo singer followed by call-and-response choral singing. As many as 60 coros de clave might have existed by 1902, some of which denied any African influence on their music. Examples of popular coros de clave include El Arpa de Oro and La Juventud.

From the coros the clave evolved the coros de guaguancó, which comprised mostly men, had a 2/4 time, and incorporated drums. Famous coros de guaguancó include El Timbre de Oro, Los Roncos (both featuring Ignacio Piñeiro, the latter as director), and Paso Franco. These ensembles gave rise to the first authentic rumba groups, and with them several types of rumba emerged, including the now popular guaguancó and yambú. However, others have been lost to time or are extremely rare today, such as the tahona, papalote, tonada, and the jiribilla and resedá.

=== Early recognition and recordings ===
Rumba served as an expression to those who were oppressed, thus beginning a social and racial identity with rumba. The synthesis of cultures can be seen in rumba because it "exhibits both continuity with older traditions and development of new ones. The rumba itself is a combination of music, dance, and poetry." During slavery, and after it was abolished, rumba served as a social outlet for oppressed slaves and the underclass which was typically danced in the streets or backyards in urban areas. Rumba is believed to have grown out of the social circumstances of Havana because it "was the center for large numbers of enslaved Africans by the end of the eighteenth century. Rebellion was difficult and dangerous, but protest in a disguised form was often expressed in recreational music and dance."

Even after slavery was abolished in Cuba, there still remained social and racial inequality, which Afro-Cubans dealt with by using rumba's music and dancing as an outlet of frustration. Because Afro-Cubans had fewer economic opportunities and the majority lived in poverty, the style of dance and music did not gain national popularity and recognition until the 1950s, and especially after the effects of the 1959 Cuban Revolution, which institutionalized it. The first commercial studio recordings of Cuban rumba were made in 1947 in New York by Carlos Vidal Bolado and Chano Pozo for SMC Pro-Arte, and in 1948 in Havana by Filiberto Sánchez for Panart. The first commercial ensemble recordings of rumba were made in the mid 1950s by Alberto Zayas and his Conjunto Afrocubano Lulú Yonkori, yielding the 1956 hit "El vive bien". The success of this song prompted the promotion of another rumba group, Los Muñequitos de Matanzas, which became extremely popular. Together with Los Muñequitos, Los Papines were the first band to popularize rumba in Cuba and abroad. Their very stylized version of the genre has been considered a "unique" and "innovative" approach.

=== Post-revolutionary institutionalization ===
After the Cuban Revolution of 1959, there were many efforts by the government to institutionalize rumba, which has resulted in two different types of performances. The first was the more traditional rumba performed in a backyard with a group of friends and family without any type of governmental involvement. The second was a style dedicated to tourists while performed in a theater setting.

Two institutions that promoted rumba as part of Cuban culture –thus creating the tourist performance– are the Ministry of Culture and the Conjunto Folklórico Nacional de Cuba ('Cuban Nacional Folkloric Company'). As Folklórico Nacional became more prevalent in the promotion of rumba, the dance "shifted from its original locus, street corners, where it often shared attention with parallel activities of traffic, business, and socializing, to its secondary quarters, the professional stage, to another home, the theatrical patio." Although Folklórico Nacional aided in the tourist promotion of rumba, the Ministry of Culture helped successfully and safely organize rumba in the streets.

In early post-revolutionary times, spontaneous rumba might have been considered problematic due to its attraction of large groups at unpredictable and spontaneous times, which caused traffic congestion in certain areas and was linked with fights and drinking. The post-revolutionary government aimed to control this "by organizing where rumba could take place agreeable and successfully, the government, through the Ministry of Culture, moved to structurally safeguard one of its major dance/music complexes and incorporate it and Cuban artists nearer the core of official Cuban culture." This change in administering rumba not only helped organize the dances but also helped it move away from the negative connotation of being a disruptive past time event.

Although this organization helped the style of rumba develop as an aspect of national culture, it also had some negative effects. For example, one of the main differences between pre- and post-revolutionary is that after the revolution rumba became more structured and less spontaneous. For instance, musicians dancers and singers gathered together to become inspired through rumba. In other words, rumba was a form of the moment where spontaneity was essentially the sole objective. However, post-revolutionary Cuba "led to manipulation of rumba form. It condensed the time of a rumba event to fit theater time and audience concentration tie. It also crystallized specific visual images through... [a] framed and packaged... dance form on stages and special performance patios." Yvonne Daniel states: “Folklórico Nacional dancers . . . must execute each dance as a separate historical entity in order to guard and protect the established representations of Cuban folkloric traditions . . . by virtue of their membership in the national company, the license to elaborate or create stylization . . . is not available to them.” As official caretakers of the national folkloric treasure, the Conjunto Folklórico Nacional has successfully preserved the sound of the mid-twentieth century Havana-style rumba.

True traditional or folkloric rumba is not as stylized as the theatrical presentations performed by professional rumba groups; rather, "[i]t is more of an atmosphere than a genre. It goes without saying that in Cuba there is not one rumba, but many rumbas." Despite the structure enforced in rumba through the Folklórico Nacional and the Ministry of Culture, traditional forms of rumba danced at informal social gatherings remain pervasive.

=== Modernization ===
In the 1980s, Los Muñequitos de Matanzas greatly expanded the melodic parameters of the drums, inspiring a wave of creativity that ultimately led to the modernization of rumba drumming. Freed from the confines of the traditional drum melodies, rumba became more an aesthetic, rather than a specific combination of individual parts. The most significant innovation of the late 1980s was the rumba known as guarapachangueo, created by Los Chinitos of Havana, and batá-rumba, created by AfroCuba de Matanzas. Batá-rumba initially was just a matter of combining guaguancó and chachalokuafún, but it has since expanded to include a variety of batá rhythms.

A review of the 2008 CD by Pedro Martínez and Román Díaz, The Routes of Rumba, describes guarapachangueo as follows:

Guarapachangueo, invented by the group Los Chinitos in Havana in the 1970s, is based on "the interplay of beats and rests", and is highly conversational (Jottar, 2008). Far from the standardized regularity of the drum rhythms of recordings such as Alberto Zayas's "El vive bien", guarapachangueo often sounds slightly random or unorganized to the untrained ear, yet presents a plethora of percussive synchronicities for those who understand the clave. Using both cajones (wooden boxes) and tumbadoras (congas), Martinez and Diaz reflect the tendencies of their generation of rumberos in combining these instruments, which widens the sonic plane to include more bass and treble sounds.

In their video about the history of guarapachangueo, Los Chinitos say that initially the word "guarapachangueo" was used by their colleague musician in a disparaging way: "What kind of guarapachangueo are you playing?". Pancho Quinto and his group Yoruba Andabo also played a vital role in the development of the genre. The word derives from "guarapachanga", itself a portmanteau of "guarapo" and "pachanga" coined by composer Juan Rivera Prevot in 1961. (Note: Guarapachanga is an unrelated style of music popularized by Félix Chappottín in the early 1960s.)

=== Legacy and influence ===
Rumba is considered "the quintessential genre of Cuban secular music and dance". In 1985 the Cuban Minister of Culture stated that "rumba without Cuba is not rumba, and Cuba without rumba is not Cuba." For many Cubans, rumba represents "a whole way of life", and professional rumberos have called it "a national sport, as important as baseball". The genre has permeated not only the culture of Cuba but also that of the whole of Latin America, including the United States, through its influence on genres such as ballroom rumba ("rhumba"), Afro-Cuban jazz and salsa.

Even though rumba is technically complicated and usually performed by a certain social class and one "racial group", Cubans consider it one of the most important facets of their cultural identity. In fact, it is acknowledged as intimately and fundamentally "Cuban" by most Cubans because it rose from Cuban social dance. After its institutionalization following the Revolution, rumba has adopted a position as a symbol of what Cuba stands for and of how Cubans want the international community to envision their country and its culture and society: vibrant, full of joy and authentic.

==== Influence on other Afro-Cuban traditions ====
Rumba has influenced both the transplanted African drumming traditions and the popular dance music created on the island. In 1950, Fernando Ortíz observed the influence of rumba upon ceremonial batá drumming: "“The drummers are alarmed at the disorder that is spreading in the temples regarding the liturgical toques ['batá rhythms']. The people wish to have fun and ask for arrumbados, which are toques similar to rumbas and are not orthodox according to rites; the drummers who do not gratify the faithful, who are the ones that pay, are not called to play and if they do not play, they do not collect.”

The batá rhythms chachalokuafun and ñongo in particular have absorbed rumba aesthetics. Michael Spiro states: “When I hear ñongo played by young drummers today, I hear rumba." In chachalokuafun the high-pitched okónkolo drum, usually the most basic and repetitive batá, improvises independently of the conversations carried on between the other two drums (iyá and itótele), in a manner suggestive of rumba.

The contemporary style of lead drum accompaniment for the chekeré ensemble known as agbe or guiro, is played on the high-pitched quinto, instead of the lower-pitched tumba as was done in earlier times. The part has evolved away from the bembé caja (lead drum) vocabulary towards quinto-like phrases.

Rumba has had a notable influence on cajón pa’ los muertos ceremonies. In a rare turn of events, the secular yambú was adopted into this Afro-Cuban religion.

==== Influence on contemporary music ====
Many of the rhythmic innovations in Cuban popular music, from the early twentieth century, until present, have been a matter of incorporating rumba elements into the son-based template. For example, bongos incorporating quinto phrases are heard on 1920s recordings of son. Several of the timbales cowbell parts introduced during the mambo era of the 1940s are Havana-style guaguancó guagua patterns:

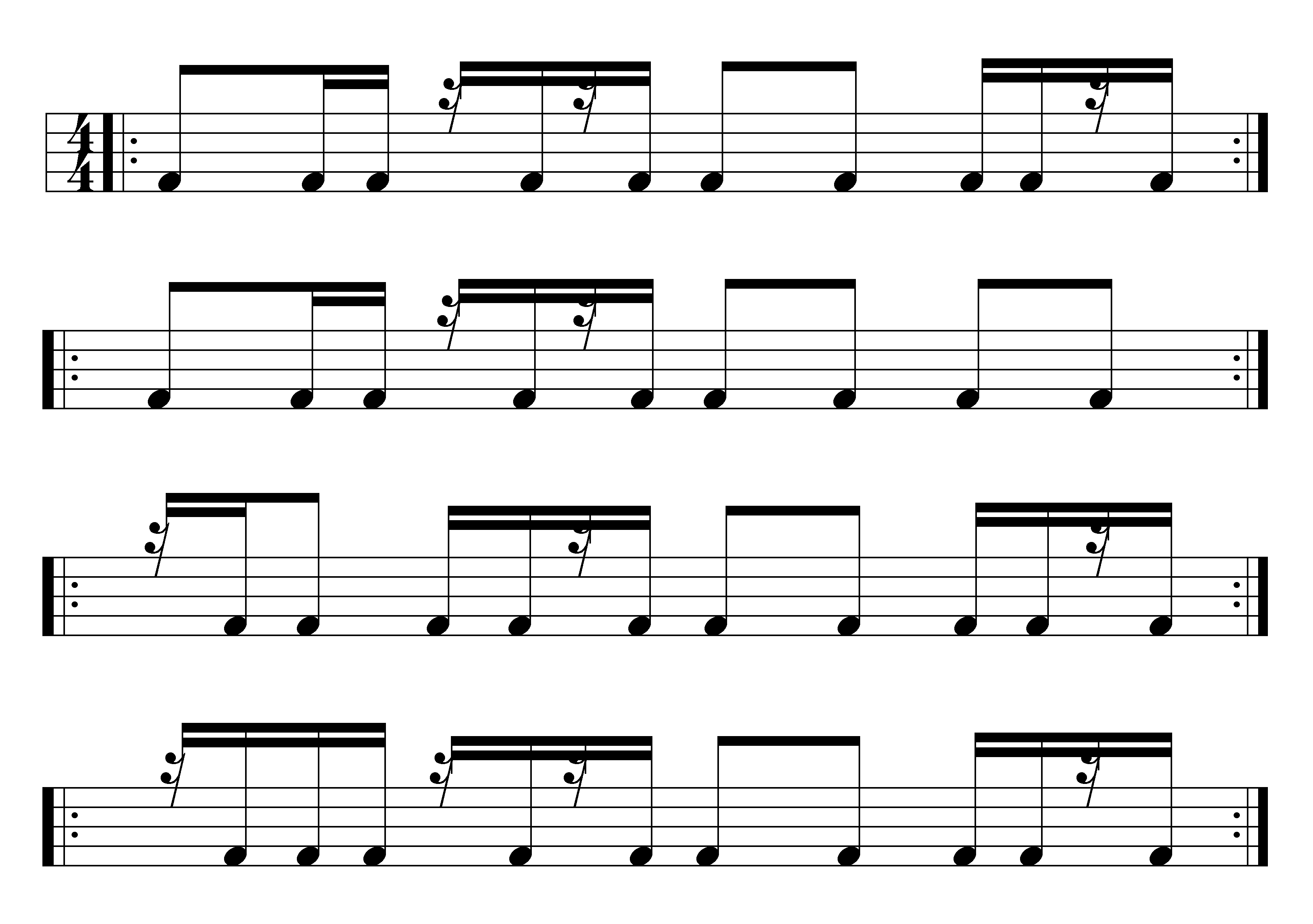
Four different timbales bell parts adapted from guaguancó guagua patterns., 2, 3, 4

Descargas (mostly instrumental jams sessions) where jazz-influenced improvisation was developed, were first known as rumbitas in the early 1940s. The musicians improvised with a rumba sensibility. By the 1950s the rhythmic vocabulary of the rumba quinto was the source of a great deal of rhythmically dynamic phrases and passages heard in Cuban popular music and Latin jazz. Even with today’s flashy percussion solos, where snare rudiments and other highly developed techniques are used, analysis of the prevailing accents will often reveal an underlying quinto structure.

In the late 1970s guaguancó was incorporated into Cuban popular music in the style known as songo. Songo congas play a hybrid of the salidor and quinto, while the timbales or drum kit play an embellishment of the Matanzas-style guagua.

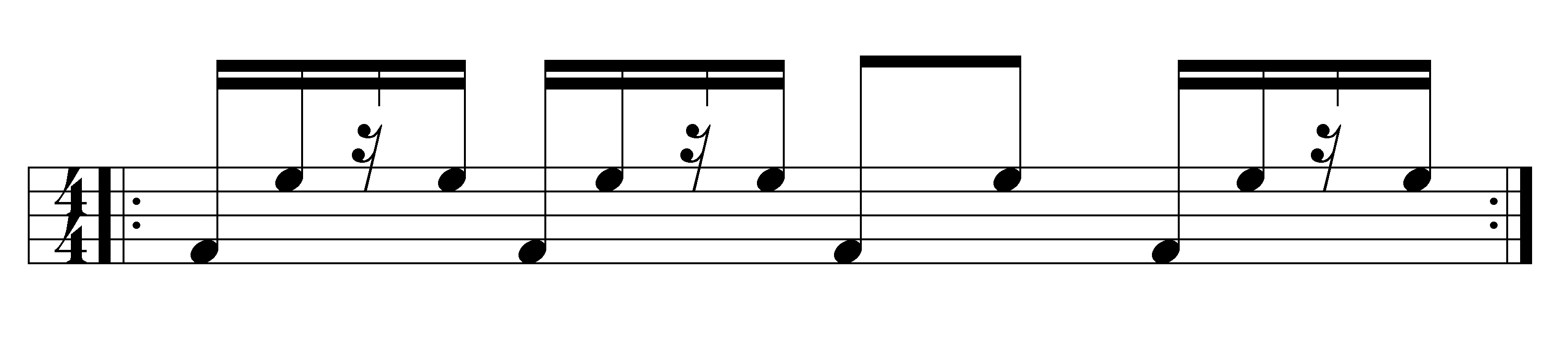
Matanzas-style guaguancó guagua

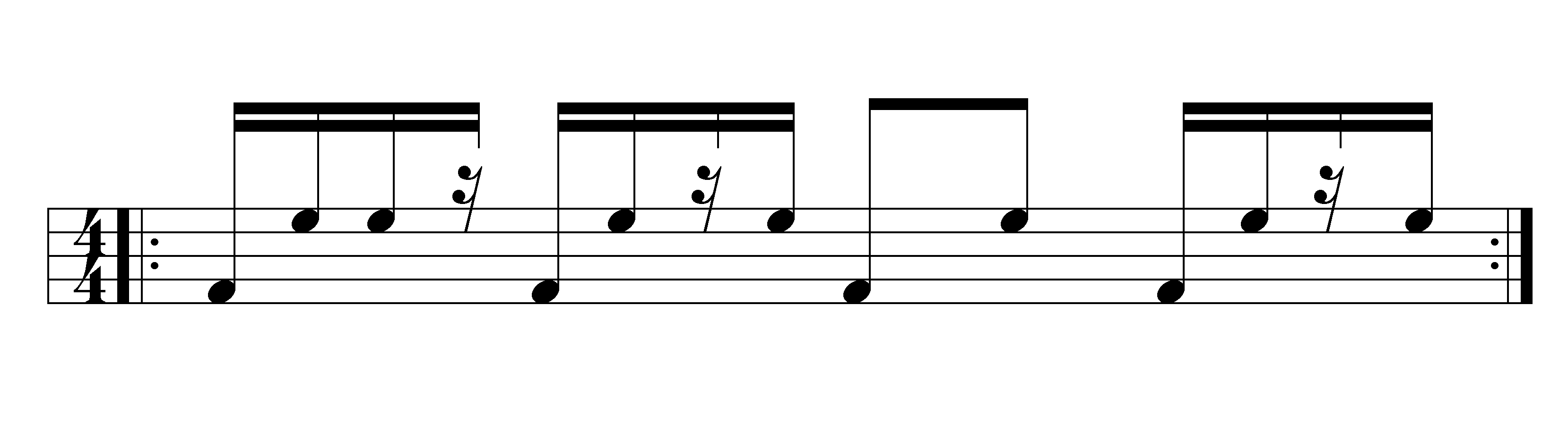
Basic songo stick pattern

Contemporary timba musicians cite rumba as a primary source of inspiration in composing and arranging. Timba composer Alain Pérez states: "In order to get this spontaneous and natural feel, you should know la rumba . . . all the percussion, quinto improvising."

== Styles ==
Traditionally rumba has been classified into three main subgenres: yambú, guaguancó and columbia. Both yambú and guaguancó originated in the solares, large houses in the poorest districts of Havana and Matanzas mostly inhabited by the descendants of enslaved Africans. Both styles are thus predominantly urban, danced by men and women alike, and exhibit a historical "binarization" of their meter, as described by Cuban musicologist Rolando Antonio Pérez Fernández. In contrast, columbia has a primarily rural origin, also in the central regions of Cuba, being almost exclusively danced by men, and remaining much more grounded in West African (specifically Abakuá) traditions, which is exemplified by its triple meter. During the 20th century, these styles have evolved, and other subgenres have appeared such as guarapachangueo and batá-rumba. In all rumba styles, there is a gradual heightening of tension and dynamics, not simply between dancers but also between dancers and musicians and dancers and spectator/participants.”

=== Yambú ===
Yambú is considered the oldest style of rumba, originating in colonial times. Hence, it is often called "yambú de tiempo España" (yambú of Spanish times). It has the slowest tempo of all rumba styles and its dance incorporates movements feigning frailty. It can be danced alone (usually by women) or by men and women together. Although male dancers may flirt with female dancers during the dance, they do not use the vacunao of guaguancó. In Matanzas the basic quinto part for yambú and guaguancó alternates the tone-slap melody. The following example shows the sparsest form of the basic Matanzas-style quinto for yambú and guaguancó. The first measure is tone-slap-tone, and the second measure is the opposite: slap-tone-slap. Regular note-heads indicate open tones and triangle note-heads indicate slaps.

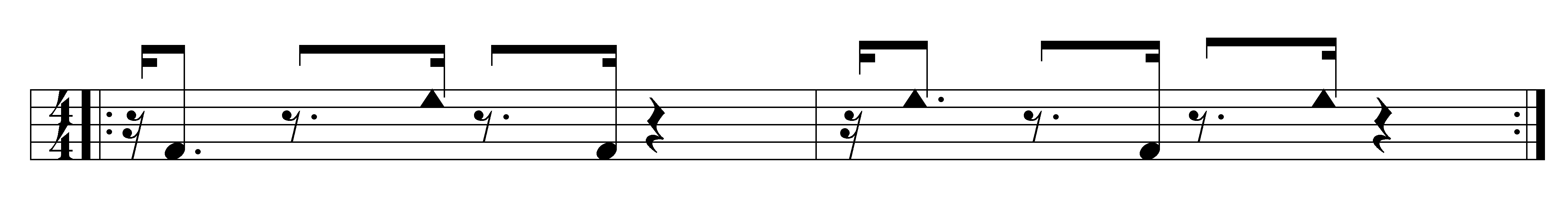
Basic Matanzas-style quinto part for yambú and guaguancó

=== Guaguancó ===
Guaguancó is the most popular and influential rumba style. It is similar to yambú in most aspects, having derived from it, but it has a faster tempo. The term "guaguancó" originally referred to a narrative song style (coros de guaguancó) which emerged from the coros de clave of the late nineteenth and early twentieth centuries. Rogelio Martínez Furé states: “[The] old folks contend that strictly speaking, the guaguancó is the narrative." The term guaguancó itself may derive etimologically from the guagua instrument.

Guaguancó is a couple dance of sexual competition between the male and female. The male periodically attempts to “catch” his partner with a single thrust of his pelvis. This erotic movement is called the vacunao (‘vaccination’ or more specifically ‘injection’), a gesture derived from yuka and makuta, symbolizing sexual penetration. The vacunao can also be expressed with a sudden gesture made by the hand or foot. The quinto often accents the vacunao, usually as the resolution to a phrase spanning more than one cycle of clave. Holding onto the ends of her skirt while seductively moving her upper and lower body in contrary motion, the female “opens” and “closes” her skirt in rhythmic cadence with the music. The male attempts to distract the female with fancy (often counter-metric) steps, accented by the quinto, until he is in position to “inject” her. The female reacts by quickly turning away, bringing the ends of her skirts together, or covering her groin area with her hand (botao), symbolically blocking the “injection.” Most of the time the male dancer does not succeed in “catching” his partner. The dance is performed with good-natured humor.

Vernon Boggs states that the woman's "dancing expertise resides in her ability to entice the male while skillfully avoiding being touched by his vacunao."

=== Columbia ===
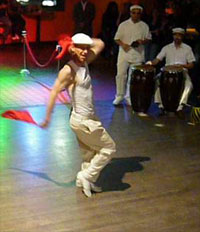
Rumba columbia performance in Washington, DC (2008)

Columbia is a fast and energetic rumba, in a triple-pulse (6/8, 12/8) structure, and often accompanied the standard bell pattern struck on a guataca ('hoe blade') or a metal bell. Columbia originated in the hamlets, plantations, and docks where men of African descent worked together. Unlike other rumba styles, columbia is traditionally meant to be a solo male dance.

According to Cuban rumba master and historian Gregorio "El Goyo" Hernández, columbia originated from the drum patterns and chants of religious Cuban Abakuá traditions. The drum patterns of the lowest conga drum is essentially the same in both columbia and Abakuá. The rhythmic phrasing of the Abakuá lead drum bonkó enchemiyá is similar, and in some instances, identical to columbia quinto phrases.

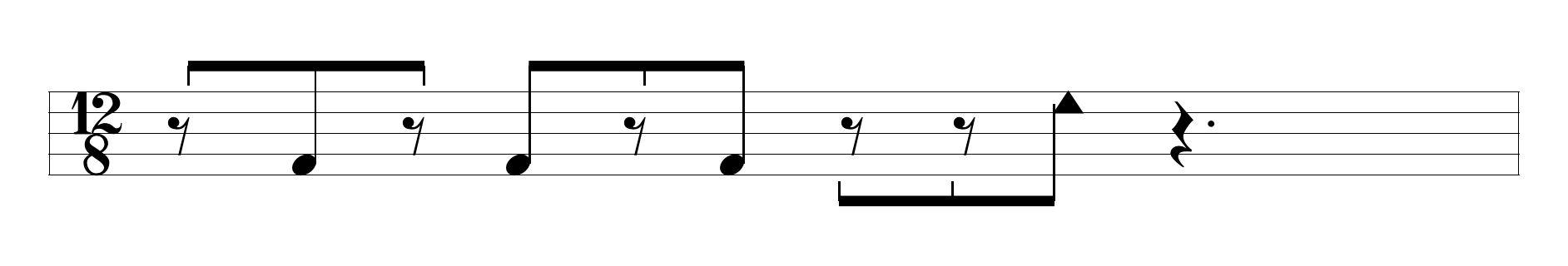
Abakuá bonkó phrase which is also played by the quinto in Columbia

In Matanzas, the melody of the basic columbia quinto part alternates with every clave. As seen in the example below, the first measure is tone-slap-tone, while the second measure is the inverse: slap-tone-slap.

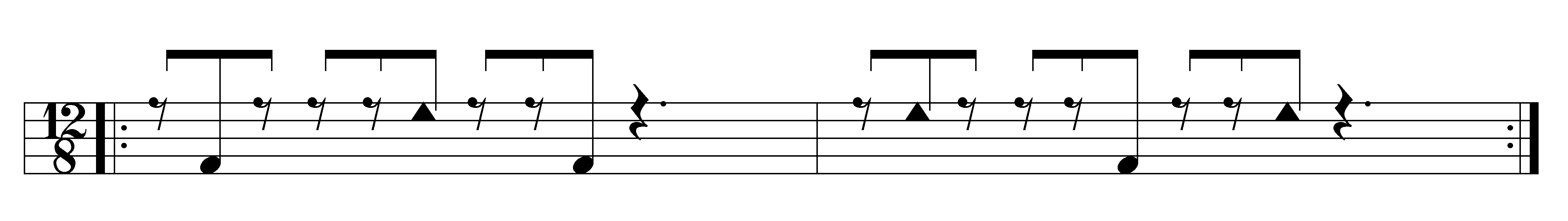
Basic Matanzas-style columbia quinto part

The guagua (cáscara or palito) rhythm of columbia, beaten either with two sticks on a guagua (hollowed piece of bamboo) or on the rim of the congas, is the same as the pattern used in abakuá music, played by two small plaited rattles (erikundi) filled with beans or similar objects. One hand plays the triple-pulse rumba clave pattern, while the other plays the four main beats.

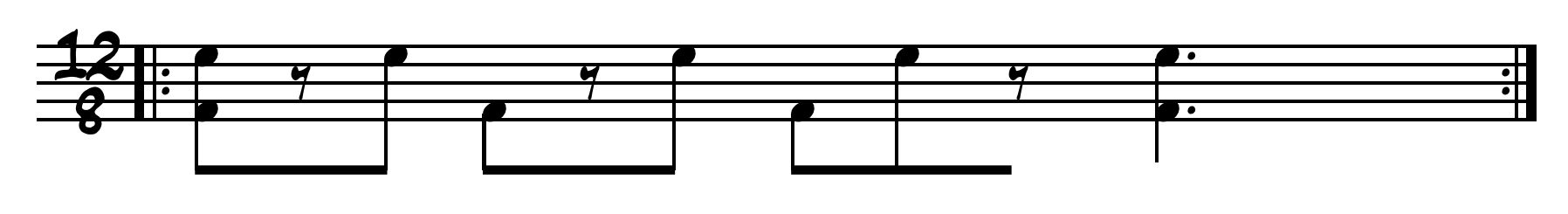
Abakuá erikundi and Columbia guagua pattern

The fundamental salidor and segundo drum melody of the Havana-style columbia, is an embellishment of six cross-beats. The combined open tones of these drums generate the melodic foundation. Each cross-beat is "doubled", that is, the very next pulse is also sounded.

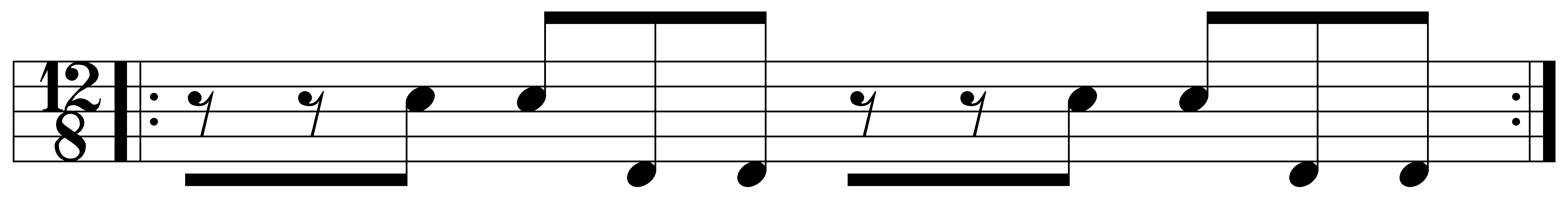
Havana-style Columbia salidor and segundo composite melody

Columbia quinto phrases correspond directly to accompanying dance steps. The pattern of quinto strokes and the pattern of dance steps are at times identical, and at other times, imaginatively matched. The quinto player must be able to switch phrases immediately in response to the dancer's ever-changing steps. The quinto vocabulary is used to accompany, inspire and in some ways, compete with the dancers' spontaneous choreography. According to Yvonne Daniel, "the columbia dancer kinesthetically relates to the drums, especially the quinto (...) and tries to initiate rhythms or answer the riffs as if he were dancing with the drum as a partner."

Men may also compete with other men to display their agility, strength, confidence and even sense of humor. Some of these aforementioned aspects of rumba columbia are derived from a colonial Cuban martial art/dance called juego de maní which shares similarities to Brazilian capoeira. Columbia incorporates many movements derived from Abakuá and yuka dances, as well as Spanish flamenco, and contemporary expressions of the dance often incorporate breakdancing and hip hop moves. In recent decades, women are also beginning to dance columbia.

== See also ==
- Clave (rhythm)
- Rumba (disambiguation)
- Rumberas film
