= Martti Aiha =

Finnish sculptor (1952–2023)

- Born: 23 December 1952; Pudasjärvi, Finland
- Died: 5 May 2023 (aged 70)
- Occupation: Sculptor
- Awards: Pro Finlandia Medal of the Order of the Lion of Finland (1992); Prince Eugen Medal (2013)

Martti Aiha (23 December 1952 – 5 May 2023) was a Finnish sculptor. He was born in Pudasjärvi and worked in Fiskars.

== Career ==
Aiha made abstract sculptured wall reliefs and free-standing sculptures. His reliefs made of transparent acrylic sheet give an impression of immateriality, incorporeality and weightlessness. The ornamental, flame-like living shapes have become his trademark. In addition to acrylic and plywood, he worked with metal, wood and plastic.

Many of Aiha's works are related to his curiosity of our use of public space.

Aiha's 15-metre (49 ft) high sculpture Rumba in black-painted aluminium was donated to the City of Helsinki by Alko, the government-owned alcohol company, in the context of Alko's 60th anniversary. The sculpture is located in Salmisaari, near Alko's then headquarters.

Aiha received the Swedish Prince Eugen Medal in 2013.

== Death ==
Aiha died on 5 May 2023, at the age of 70.
