= Rumba (sculpture) =

Sculpture by Martti Aiha in Helsinki, Finland

Coordinates: 60°9′47.52″N 24°54′17.64″E

Rumba is a sculpture by sculptor Martti Aiha, located on the Porkkalankatu street in the district of Salmisaari in Helsinki, Finland. Aiha thinks the sculpture is one of his best. Rumba is made of black-painted aluminium and is 15 metres tall. The sculpture belongs to the collection of the Helsinki Art Museum.

In 1994 Rumba was awarded as the environmental artwork of the year. The prize was awarded for a collection the sculpture forms in connection with a residential building designed by Veli-Pekka Tuominen.

== Background ==
In 1990, in preparation for its 60th anniversary the state alcohol monopoly company Alko decided to host an artwork competition. The winning artwork would be donated to the city of Helsinki and located near the Alko head office in Salmisaari. The contest was won by Martti Aiha and his sculpture Rumba was revealed on 5 April 1992.

Martti Aiha thought of many things when designing the sculpture. He knew that the sculpture would be passed by much traffic, so he wanted a sculpture that could be seen in its entirety even when quickly passing by it on a bus. He chose black as the colour for the sculpture as he thought it was the only colour that fits in the surroundings. The name Rumba is based on the rumba music style and the traffic that "dances the rumba" past the sculpture.

== Movement to temporary storage in 2020 ==
Rumba was moved to temporary storage in August 2020. The movement was based on the construction of the office building We Land by the construction company NCC.

"In order to safely transport the sculpture it will first have to be dismantled. Crane machinery will be used in the dismantling, and the sculpture will be fenced off to ensure safe working conditions", said NCC project manager Timo Henno. The sculpture will be later returned to its place.
