= Mario Sanchez (artist) =

American painter (1908–2005)

Mario Sanchez (7 October 1908 – 28 April 2005) was a Cuban-American folk artist from the Key West cigar-making neighborhood known as "Gato Village". Self-taught, Sanchez began working artistically in 1930 on media like paper bags and cedar wood boards. He would come to specialize in bas relief wood carvings that he would then paint over in vibrant colors, usually depicting scenes of everyday Key West life. Some of his carvings have been valued at more than $50,000.

Described as a "memory artist" like Grandma Moses or Clementine Hunter, after earning a business degree in stenography in 1925, Sanchez went to Ybor City in Tampa to work as a clerk. In 1930, he was hired at the Monroe County Courthouse as a translator and stenographer, and so returned home to Key West. He explored his creative streak by writing comedic Spanish-language skits for the San Carlos playhouse and by whittling small fish native to the Florida Keys. This carving would carry over into his more lasting works of art, where he would carve scenes into wooden panels, then illustrate them with highly detailed paint work.

He has been called the most important Cuban-American folk artist of the 20th century.
