= Josep Anselm Clavé =

Spanish businessperson, composer and writer (1824–1874)

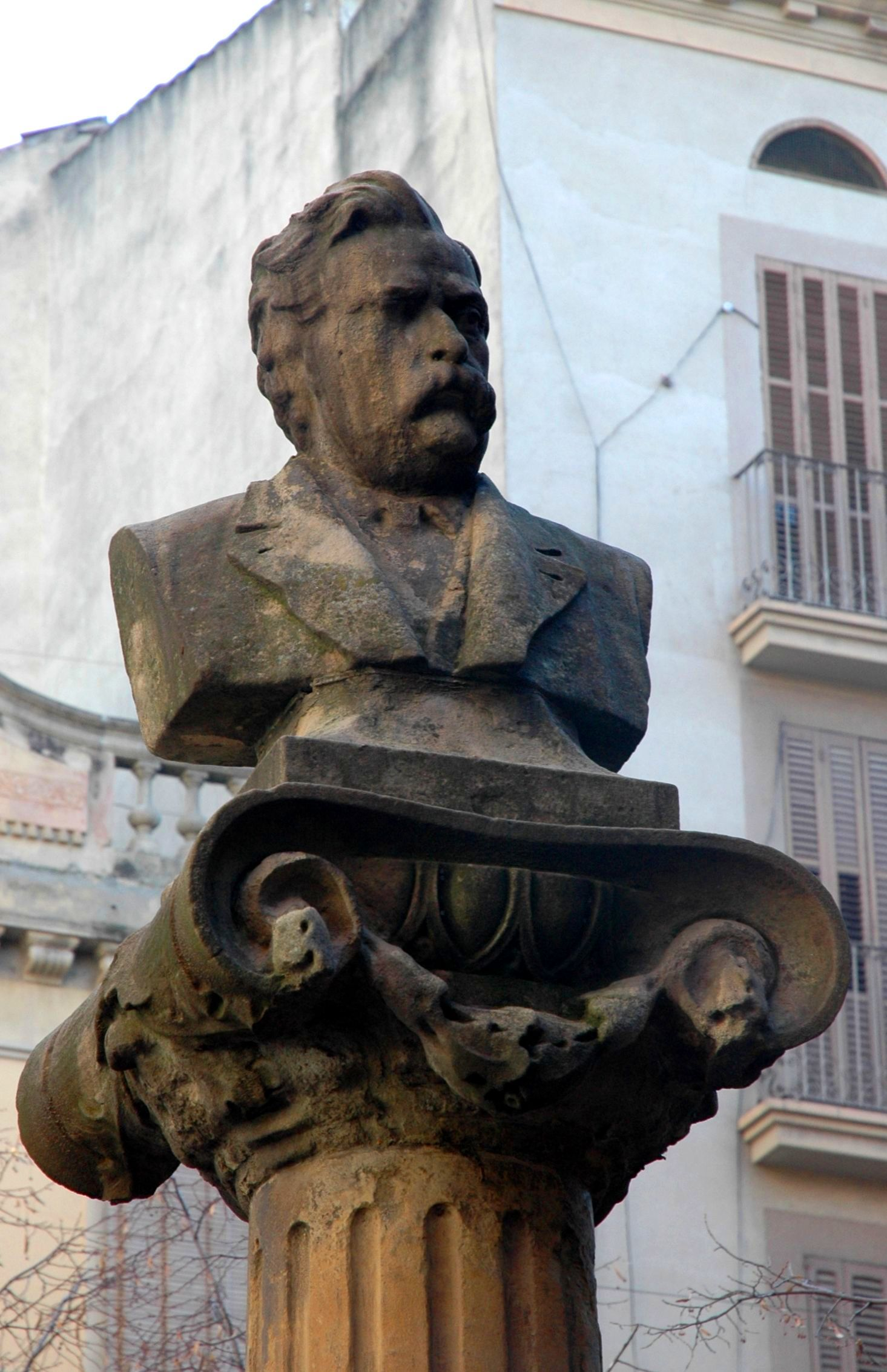
- Born: Josep Anselm Clavé i Camps; 21 April 1824; Barcelona, Catalonia, Spain
- Died: 24 February 1874 (aged 49); Barcelona, Catalonia, Spain
- Other name: José Anselmo Clavé
- Occupations: politician and composer

Josep Anselm Clavé i Camps (21 April 1824 – 24 February 1874) also known as José Anselmo Clavé, was a Catalan politician, composer and writer, founder of the choral movement in Catalonia and a promoter of the associative movement.

He was the initiator of choral singing in Catalonia. His first experiences in the musical field were marked by the plight of his family. Clavé was forced to earn a living by singing for coffee in taverns accompanied by a guitar, when he was 17 years old. The contact with the workers, gathering in those places, led him to take them out from the taverns and meet them in choral societies. He acquired notions of violin, flute and music theory, which allowed him to compose lyrics and music for songs. In 1845 he organized Aurora, a choral society that would later become La Fraternitat (The Fraternity), a society of mutual help and the first Iberian chorale. In 1857, Clavé renamed it Euterpe. The Euterpenses societies, spread throughout Catalonia and the Valencian Country were the origin of the Cors de Clavé.

As a politician, he was an early supporter of Abdó Terrades and Narcís Monturiol. In 1843 he took part in a revolt against General Espartero and in 1845 was detained in the Citadel of Barcelona. During the Progressive biennium (1854–1856) he was involved in politics, but the repression of 1856 confined him to prison in Mahón and Palma. He was elected President of the Provincial Council of Barcelona during the reign of Amadeu I in 1873. In the same year he became a Member of the Cortes Constituentes and civil governor of Castelló de la Plana and Tarragona. He retired from public life after the coup of General Pavía.

== Early years ==
The son of Francesc Clavé, a carpenter by profession and of Agnès Camps, he was born in the Barcelona neighborhood of La Ribera, in a modest family, although with a certain economic well-being, caused not by abundance but by stability. This situation did not last long, as the family business suffered a severe economic setback which brought the Clavé family serious difficulties. At the age of six, he lost his sight in one eye due to an infection, which ultimately led to him leaving school. He started working as a lathe turner, but soon had to quit because with only one eye, he had to sit in a position which led to a malformation in the shoulder. From that moment –and influenced by the sensitivity and taste for the arts of his mother– he devoted himself, in a self-didactic way, to studying music and poetry. In this way, with solid human and musical education, he introduced himself to the practice of music, in French literature and social thought, so important for his political education. Shortly afterwards, he began to turn his hobby of playing the guitar into a professional alternative, and decided to rent himself out in different cafes in Barcelona, as a guitarist. It is here where his real musical activity would begin in the context of popular music, typical of taverns and leisure venues.

From an early age he showed a political affiliation with the left and the Spanish republican movement, and linked with such characters as Narcís Monturiol and Abdó Terrades. All of them collaborated on the creation of the first communist newspaper in Spain. Between 1840 and 1843 he took an active part in the urban uprisings in Barcelona, so he was arrested and imprisoned in the military fortress of Ciutadella.

When it returned to its activity like musician in the cafés of Barcelona, at the same time as it made contact with the music of the time, it noticed of the acceptance and success between the popular public of his compositions and interpretations. He proposed a genre of songs more refined than those that were fashionable in these settings and presented them as an alternative.

== Clavé and choral singing ==
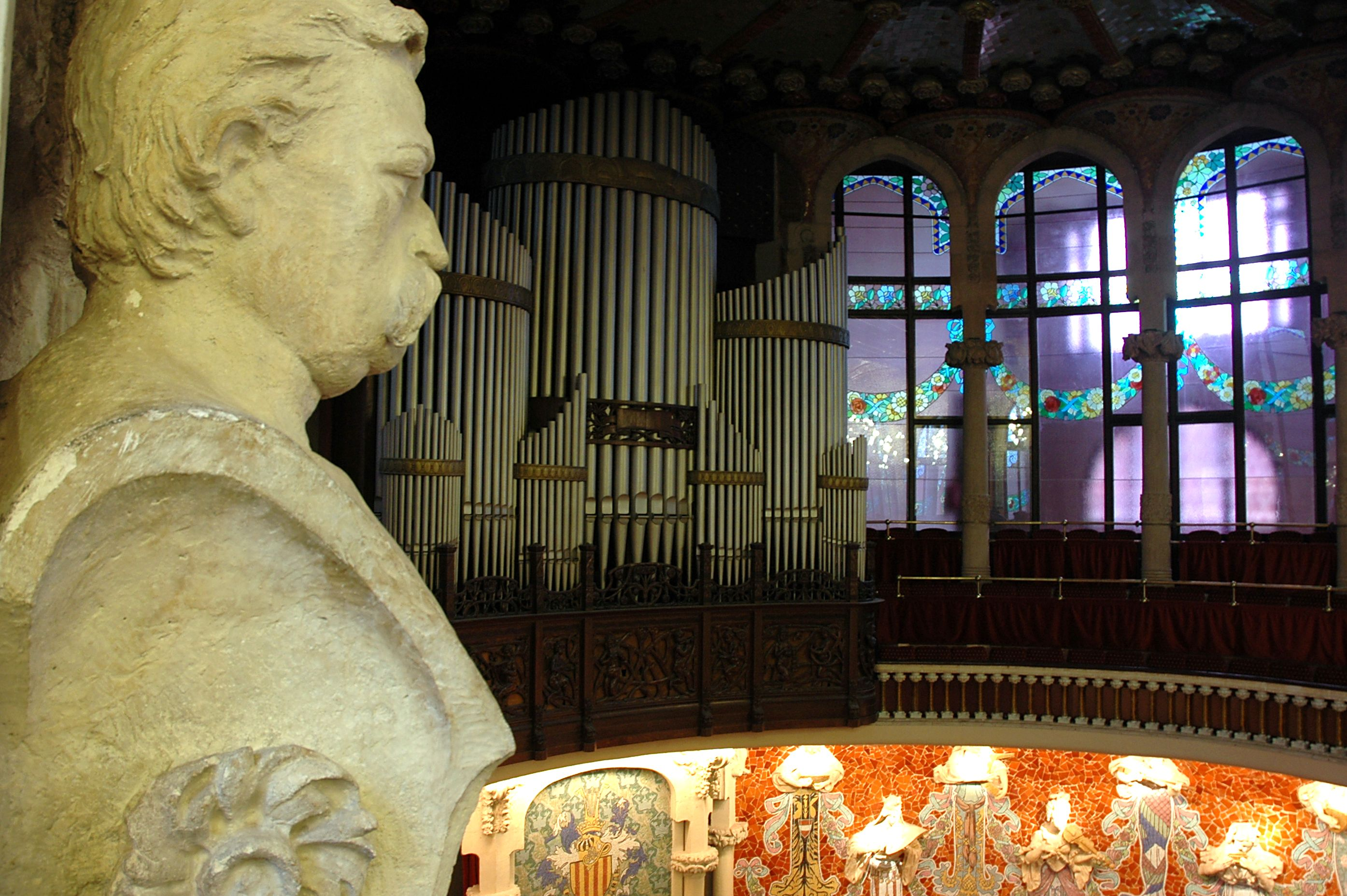
Bust of Clavé at the Palau de la Música Catalana in Barcelona

It gained popularity and in 1845 it was called by some friends to form and lead a modest orchestral society that would be called La Aurora, composed of about twenty men who played very diverse popular instruments (guitars, bandurrias, triangles, tambourines, etc.). These kinds of formations, such as the fables or the tannins, proliferated between 1845 and 1849 in Barcelona, and facilitated, and largely served as, the basis for the development and expansion of choral societies from 1850.

Due to the difficulty of creating a suitable repertoire for a group of musicians as heterogeneous as La Aurora, Clavé chose to have them all sing, but the polyphonic texture needed to be preserved. Hence the idea of creating a choral society, La Fraternitat, which would be the first in Spain (2 February 1850).

Through La Fraternitat, Clavé managed to bring music and culture closer to a working class, which was denied access at the time to a life that reduced to many hours of work. in harsh conditions and without the opportunity to enjoy extra-work activities of any kind, neither leisure, nor health or education. Therefore, what Clavé was introducing was a social revolution.

Following the example of La Fraternitat, choral groups that imitated La Fraternitat soon began to form in Barcelona and in the neighboring towns. The trend would spread throughout Catalonia in a few years. Chanting choral music became an activity of the working class, their escape from a hard life of work and sacrifice.

In 1853 Clavé decided to rent the Jardins de la Nimfa, located on Passeig de Gràcia, to perform regularly. These concerts, started by La Fraternitat, found the opposition of the upper classes, who prevented this activity, as well as dance sessions. But its success continued, and the activity was moved to the Camps Elisis (also Passeig de Gràcia).

Until 1856 this activity lasted and was highly successful, but the socio-political tensions and crisis of 1855 caused the Clave to be detained and deported to the Balearic Islands.

When he was released again, Clavé recovered what had been interrupted. He [1857] organized shows in the Lutheran Gardens, this time without relying on any outside companies to close. The Fraternity would be renamed Societat Coreal Euterpe.

The popular shows and dances at the Lutheran Gardens enjoyed great success, and concerts were held in different sessions throughout the day. Clavé decided to publish an activity program called Euterpe Echo, a newsletter containing all related events, as well as literary excerpts and news, which would increase the impact of the Euterpe Gardens.

Due to the numerous choral entities that sought to follow the Claverian example, the 1860 l'Euterpense Association, a kind of federation that grouped choral organizations, provided them with advice and repertoire, was founded. It was also a way of avoiding parallel choral societies that were a competition for Claverian choruses and their activities, as well as isolating them, as well as controlling who had access to the Claverian repertoire and who did not.

Between the years 1860 and 1864 the artistic activities of this federation had a great impact, bringing together thousands of singers and hundreds of musicians in common concerts. In that context, Clavé performed choral and instrumental fragments from Tannhäuser , which was the first time that Wagner had been heard in Spain. At this time there were already eighty-four choral societies in Spain and also in Cuba. The Associació Euterprense published the newspaper El Metrónomo, which appeared in 1863–64 and which published Catalan choral activity.

The 1867, Clavé was detained and deported to Madrid, but despite this the activities of the Euterpe Gardens, of the Societat Coral Euterpe, dances, concerts, performances in the city streets and in different theaters, etc. they went on as normal.

From 1868, and as a result of the September Revolution, La Gloriosa, Clavé Choirs were no longer the essential tool for channeling Republican concerns, now directed first through the Democratic Party and then of the Republican Party. Clavé, who had never left political activity, held various public posts. The same 1868 was a member of the Revolutionary Board; the following year he was the Vice President of the Tortosa Pact; in 1871 he was elected deputy and named President of the Barcelona Provincial Council; and in 1873, with the First Spanish Republic, civil governor of Castellón and Government Delegate in Tarragona. The coup of General Manuel Pavía on 3 January 1874, put an end to the Republic and all the democratic hopes deposited in it. Clavé returned to Barcelona where he died weeks later, February 24.

== Bibliography ==
- ARTÍS, Pere. El cant coral a Catalunya (1891–1879). Barcelona: Ed. Barcino, 1980
- ARTÍS, Pere. Clavé. Barcelona: Edicions Nou Art Thor, 1988. (Col.«Gent Nostra»)
- AVIÑOA, Xosé. Música i cultura popular al segle XIX. Barcelona:1984. («Ponència presentada al Col·loqui Internacional sobre la Renaixença, Barcelona»)
- CANADELL i RUSIÑOL, Roger. Josep Anselm Clavé i l'escriptura: obra poètica i periodisme cultural. Ed. Universitat de Barcelona, 2012
- CARBONELL i GUBERNA, Jaume. Josep Anselm Clavé i el naixement del cant Coral a Catalunya (1850–1874). Cabrera de Mar: Galerada, 2000
- CARBONELL i GUBERNA, Jaume. La societat coral Euterpe. Barcelona. Rúbrica editorial, 2008
- CARBONELL i GUBERNA, Jaume. «Notes per a l'estudi de la promoció musical a la Barcelona contemporània», Revista Musical Catalana, núm.75 (gener 1991), 34–36
- MESTRES, Apeles. Clavé sa vida y sas obras. Barcelona: Germans Salvat, 1876
- POBLET, Josep M. Josep Anselm Clavé i la seva època (1824–1874). Barcelona: Dopesa, 1973.
- RISQUES, Manuel. Clavé, demòcrata i federalista: La Primera República. Barcelona: El Graó, 1987. (Col.«Biblioteca de la Classe», núm.26.)
- ROCA i ROCA, Josep. «José Anselmo Clavé», Boletín del Ateneo Barcelonés, núm.9 (julio 1888), 25–47
- RODOREDA, Josep. Clavé y su obra. Barcelona: Imp.Cunill, 1897
- SUBIRÁ, José. El músico-poeta Clavé. Imp. Alrededor del mundo, Madrid, 1924
- VALLS, Manuel. La música catalana contemporània. Barcelona: Selecta, 1960
- VIALETTE, Aurélie. Intellectual Philanthropy: the Seduction of the Masses. Purdue UP, 2018.
- VIDAL i VALENCIANO, Eduard, i Josep ROCA i ROCA. «José Anselmo Clavé», Eco de Euterpe, núms. 408 i ss. (1874)
- VINYES, Ricard. «Música, ball i cant en els moviments socials: El cas Clavé», Revista de Catalunya, núm.37 (gener 1900), 81–96
- VIRELLA i CASAÑES, Francesc. Estudios de crítica musical. Barcelona: La Publicidad, 1893
