= Yuka (music) =

Afro-Cuban musical tradition

- Stylistic origins: Kongo music
- Cultural origins: c. 1800, western Cuba
- Derivative forms: Yambú; rumba

Other topics
- Palo (Regla de Congo)

Yuka is a secular Afro-Cuban musical tradition which involves drumming, singing and dancing. It was developed in western Cuba by Kongo slaves during colonial times. Yuka predates other Afro-Cuban genres of dance music like rumba and has survived in Kongo communities of Pinar del Río, specifically in El Guayabo and Barbacoa, San Luis. Since the 1940s, yuka performances have been recorded by researchers such as Harold Courlander and María Teresa Linares.

== Music ==
=== Drumming ===
The Bantu word yuka means "to beat" and is also used to refer to the drums used in yuka performances. According to Fernando Ortiz, yuka drums were known in the Kongo language as ngóma bobóla mámbu, where ngóma means "drum", bobóla "deep sound" and mámbu "collective business". These drums are made from hollowed-out trunks of the avocado tree. Leather is nailed to one of the open ends, and the player hits the skin with both hands, the drum being slanted between his legs. The drums come in three sizes:

- caja, the largest and lowest-pitched yuka drum;
- mula, medium sized;
- cachimbo, the smallest and highest-pitched drum, it is also known as tumba, tumbador, llamador or tahona.

Modern conga drums, also known as tumbadoras, may descend from the yuka drums.

Rhythms may also be played on the drum body, the drummer using a small mallet or a stave in one hand, the other hand slapping the leather. The drummer wears two small rattles (nkembí), made of metal or gourds, on his wrists. The drums may be accompanied by staves on a guagua (hollow wooden slit drum) or the drum body, and by percussion on a piece of iron, the muela or a guataca (a hoe pick used for plowing). The yuka accompanied by this guataca bell plays a variation of the commonly used tresillo pattern.

=== Singing ===
Like most Afro-Cuban music, yuka singing is based on call and response. Songs have a simple structure and sung phrases are generally short. There is a main motif over which singers are allowed to improvise.

== Dance ==
The secular dance is performed by a couple as a stylised contest: the man chases, the woman avoids. The origin of the yuka lies in western Cuba, particularly Matanzas and Pinar del Río, where it gave rise to the yambú style of rumba. There are several dance moves in yuka that are not found in rumba, such as ronquido (side steps) and campanero (figure eight).

== See also ==
- Makuta (drum)
