= Abakuá =

Afro-Cuban fraternity or secret society

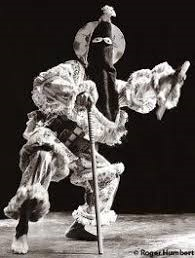
Photograph of an Ireme dancer

Abakuá, also sometimes known as Ñañiguismo, is a Cuban initiatory religious fraternity founded in 1836. The society is open only to men and those initiated take oaths to not reveal the secret teachings and practices of the order. Members are typically known as Abanékues and are divided amongst lodges or chapters called juegos. Abakuá derives largely from the Ékpè society of West Africa but shows adaptations like the inclusion of Roman Catholic symbolism.

The society teaches the existence of a supreme divinity named Abasí who supplied humanity with a form of supernatural power. This power holds a central place in Abakuá's origin myth. Rituals are called plantes and typically take place in a secluded room, the fambá. Many of the details of these ceremonies are kept secret although they usually involve drumming. Some of the Abakuá society's ceremonies take place in public. Most notable are the public parades on the Day of the Three Kings, when members dress as íremes, or spirits of the dead.

Abakuá derives much from the Ékpè society, which was established by Ejagham people living around West Africa's Cross River basin during the 18th century. Ékpè was involved in international trade, including in slaves, as a result of which various Efik people, including Ékpè members, were enslaved and transported to Cuba. It was there, in 1836, that Abakuá was formed in Regla. The society soon spread to other areas and split into two branches, the Efó and the Efí. Although membership was initially restricted to Afro-Cubans, by the 1860s it also had members from other ethnic backgrounds. Becoming increasingly influential in the stevedore, transportation, and manufacturing industries of Cuba's ports, Abakuá also developed a reputation for criminal activity. After the Cuban Revolution, Abakuá continued to face persecution but benefitted from the liberalising reforms of the 1990s, when it became increasingly important in Cuba's tourist industry.

== Definition ==
Abakuá represents a confraternity. It is a religious group, often seen as a religion by its practitioners, and it seeks to provide spiritual protection for its members. It also operates as a mutual aid society, offering economic assistance to its members. Only men are permitted entry—although gay men are typically excluded—with these members regarding each other as brothers. These members are referred to as Abanékues, or as ecobios. A once common term for members was Ñáñigos, a term potentially deriving from the nyanya raffia chest piece worn on many Ekpe and Abakuá ritual costumes. Abakuá has been described as "an Afro-Cuban version of Freemasonry".

The term Abakuá likely comes from Àbàkpà (Qua-Éjághám), one of the peoples from Calabar. Abakuá is one of three major Afro-Cuban religions present on the island, the other two being Santería, which derives largely from the Yoruba religion of West Africa, and Palo, which has its origins among the Kongo religion of Central Africa. Another Afro-Cuban religion is Arará, which derives from practices among the Ewe and Fon. In Cuba, practitioners of these traditions often see these different religions as offering complementary skills and mechanisms to solve problems. Thus, some Abakuá members also practice Palo, or Santería, or alternatively are babalawos, initiates in the divinatory system of Ifá.

=== Organisation and membership ===
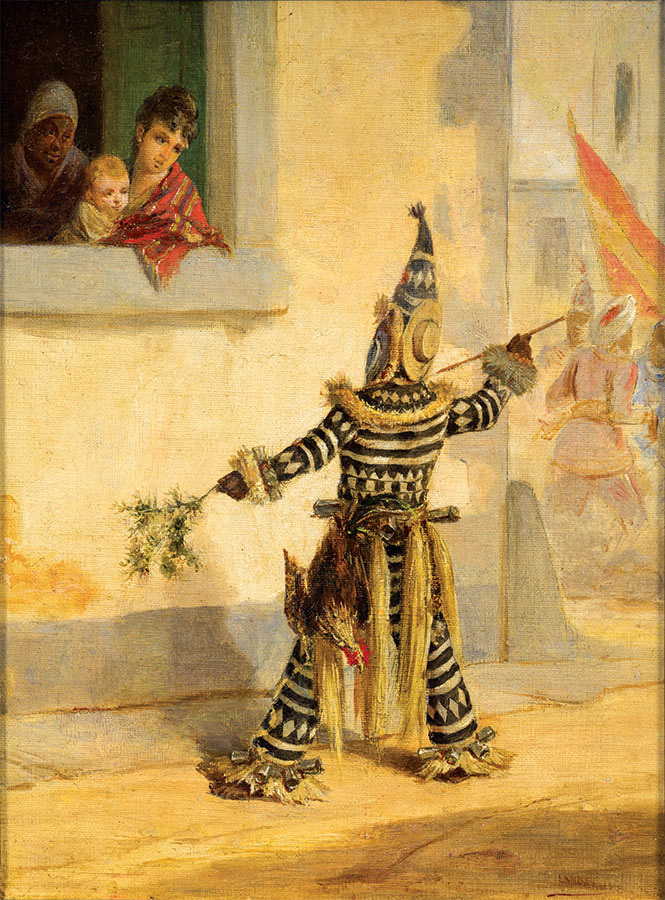
Painting of a "diablito" Ireme dancer in Cuba

Operating along a highly organised structure, the Abakuá society displays a complex hierarchy. Different members play different functions in the society. Members pay fees to join the society and subsequent dues, money which finances the operation of the society. Members are bound to oaths of secrecy not to reveal details of the group's beliefs and practices.

Chapters are referred to as juegos, potencias, tierras, and partidos. The creation of a new chapter requires the permission of the society's elders as well as a collective consensus in favor of its establishment. The formation of a new lodge requires consecrated drums. Each juego has between 13 and 25 dignitaries, or plazas, who govern it. Each dignitary has a different title that indicate which ritual tasks are their responsibility. If there is a disagreement within a juego, members can branch off to form their own group. In 2014, the scholar Ivor Miller noted that there were then approximately 150 lodges active in Cuba.

Initiation may only take place in Cuba itself. The oaths of loyalty to the Abakuá society's sacred objects, members, and secret knowledge taken by initiates are a lifelong pact that creates a sacred kinship among the members. The duties of an Abakuá member to his ritual brothers at times surpass even the responsibilities of friendship. The phrase "Friendship is one thing, and the Abakuá another" is often heard. A member's loyalty is primarily owed to their lodge and its lineage. Members identify each other through coded handshakes, phrases, or, in certain circumstances, specific whistles.

== Beliefs and practices ==
Abakuá draws heavily on the West African Ekpe society but also reflects innovations and developments that have taken place in Cuba. The supreme deity in Abakuá is called Abasí. Members look back to Calabar as a holy place.

=== Origin story ===
There are various versions of the group's origin story, some of which contradict the others. It revolves principally around how the god Abasi delivered a source of power, which was in the form of the fish Tanze, to two rival groups, the Efor and the Efik. In one version, an Efor woman, Sikán, found the fish in the river and revealed it to the Efik; another variant has her betray the Efor after she married an Efik man. Some versions of the story maintain that men killed Sikán and seized the power; they then banned women from involvement in their society so that they would never again obtain the power. In the story, the Efik then pressured the Efor to share the power with them, with seven members of each group meeting to sign an agreement; one individual refused, and this resulted in the thirteen major plazas within the society.

This origin myth explains the exclusion of women from the society. The myth is also re-enacted through a number of the society's rituals.

=== Practices ===
The society's rituals are called plantes. These include initiations, funerals, the naming of dignitaries, and the annual homage to Ekué. The details of these rites are kept secret from non-members.

Rituals often take place in a special room, the "room of mysteries", known as the fambá, irongo, or fambayín. This room is prepared for rituals by the drawing of images, called anaforuanas or firmas, on the space and objects within it.

Brown noted that altar objects are "permanent living repositories of ancestral presences". These altar objects may be renevado (renovated) during which they are redecorated, and this may also entail then being "recharged" with spiritually powerful substances. Aesthetic innovations developed in one lodge may get adopted by others.

These are full of theatricality and drama, and consist of drumming, dancing, and chanting in the secret Abakuá language. Knowledge of the chants is restricted to Abakuá members. Cuban scholars have long thought that the ceremonies express Abakuá cultural history.

When a lodge member dies, all of the lodge's other activities stop until the correct rites have been conducted.

==== Music ====
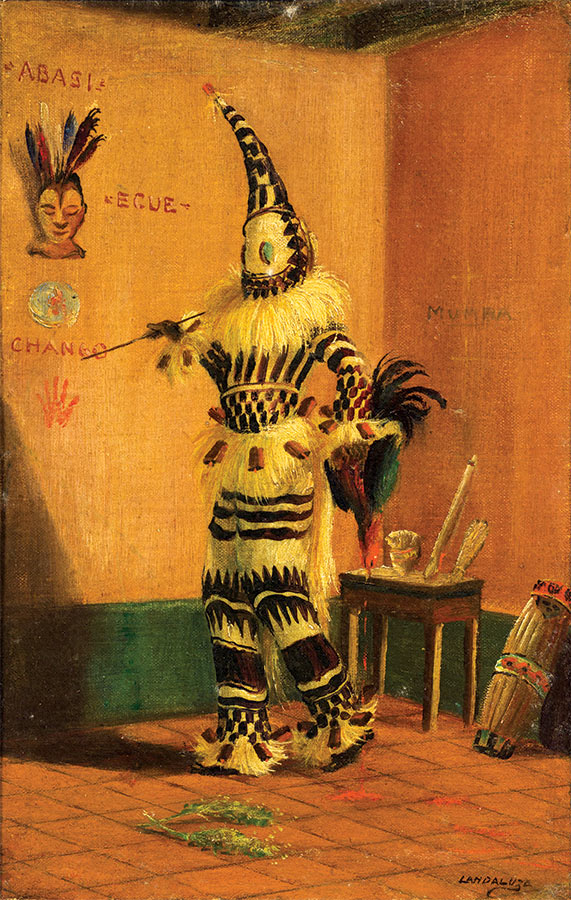
Painting of an Ireme dancer in a ceremony in Cuba

Music is central to Abakuá rituals. Drumming plays an important role in Abakuá rituals, as it does in other Afro-Cuban traditions. Abakuá chapters will often have two separate sets of drums, one used in public events and the other in private ceremonies. These drums will be consecrated prior to ritual use and then fed with the blood of sacrificed animals.

Public drumming ceremonies rely on the use of four drums, each typically cut from a single log and left undecorated except for an anaforuana marked onto the skin. The largest of these drums is called the bonkó enchemiyá; it is approximately 1 metre tall and placed at a slight tilt when being played. The other three drums, which are typically around 9 to 10 inches in height, are called enkomó. The three are tuned to produce different types of sound; that which reaches the highest pitch is the binkomé, the middle is the kuchí yeremá, and the lowest is the obiapá or salidor. The three enkomó are each placed under one arm and hit with the other, using fingers rather than the whole hand. As well as these four drums, the public rituals are typically accompanied with two rattles, the erikundí, and a bell made from two triangular pieces of iron, the ekón.

Private rituals involve four drums, the enkríkamo, ekueñón, empegó, and eribó or seseribó. These four drums are decorated with at least one feathered staff, attached at the end with the skin. They may also have a "skirt" of shredded fibers. The eribó, which has four of the feathered staffs rather than just one, is constructed differently, having the skin attached to a hoop of flexible material. Sacrificial offerings are placed over this drum, which represents the dignitary Isué. The enkríkamo is used to convene the spirits of the dead, while the ekueñón is employed by the dignitary tasked with dispending justice and performing sacrifices, which the drum is expected to witness. The empegó is played by the dignitary of the same name and is used to open and close ceremonies.

Also important in rites is a drum called the ekve, which is kept concealed behind a curtain in the fambá. The ekve is a single-headed wooden friction drum with three openings at the base, giving the impression of three legs. It is played by rubbing a stick over the skin, with the resulting sound symbolising the voice of Tanze the fish.

Although hermetic and little known even within Cuba, an analysis of Cuban popular music recorded from the 1920s until the present reveals Abakuá influence in nearly every genre of Cuban popular music. Cuban musicians who are members of the Abakuá have continually documented key aspects of their society's history in commercial recordings, usually in their secret Abakuá language. The Abakuá have commercially recorded actual chants of the society, believing that outsiders cannot interpret them. Because Abakuá represented a rebellious, even anti-colonial, aspect of Cuban culture, these secret recordings have been very popular.

=== Day of the Three Kings ===
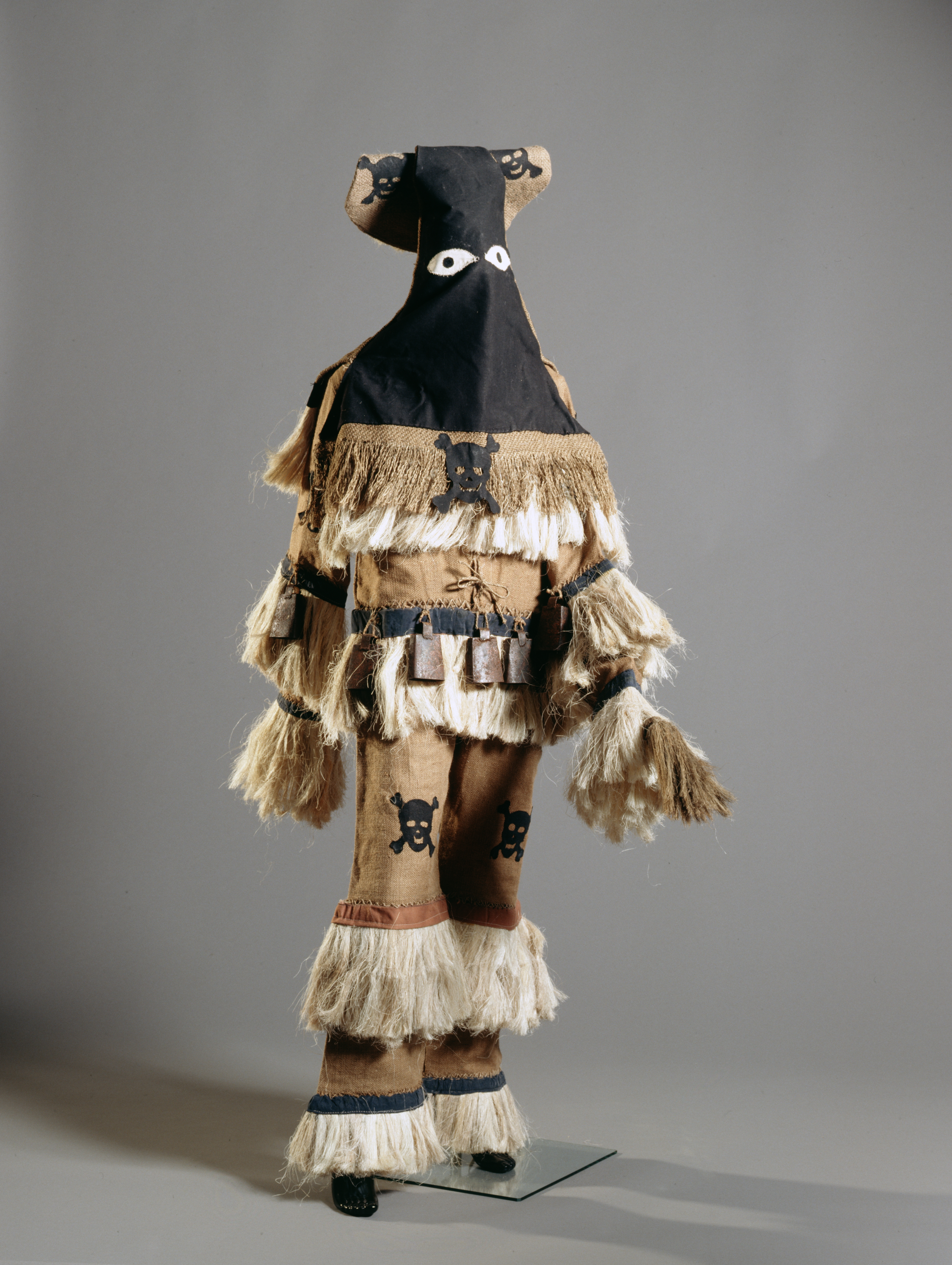
Ireme costume (National Museum of World Cultures)

Members take part in the public carnival held on January 6, the Day of the Three Kings. For this they wear elaborate outfits consisting of checkerboard cloth, a design perhaps influenced by a leopard skin pattern. They also wear a conical headpiece that is topped by tassels, which is based on those of the Ejagham. Dressing as íremes signifies the return of the dead to Earth.

Permission to conduct an Abakuá procession must come from the lodge leaders and also requires access to their ritual objects.

=== Language ===
The ritual language used in Abakuá is commonly called Brícamo. The Abakua language was proposed by Nunez Cedeno (1985) to be a Spanish-based pidgin, with the main African lexical influence originating from the Ibibio language.

== History ==
=== Ékpè and the Atlantic slave trade ===
Abakuá was heavily influenced by the Ékpè society, which existed among the settlements of the Cross River basin in what is now Nigeria and Cameroon during the 18th and 19th centuries. Ékpè lodges have commonly also been called leopard societies. Ékpè emerged among 18th-century Efik people as a means of transcending ethnic and family barriers and thus facilitating business relations for the trade in palm oil and slaves to European merchants. Dominated by wealthy merchants, it was an all-male society, and members were expected to keep its rites a secret – those who revealed secrets to outsiders could be punished with death. Some Europeans, especially British traders, were also initiated into the group, as it helped to build trust and credit.

The Efik of this period engaged in slavery; they enslaved members of their own people who were deemed guilty of theft or adultery, purchased slaves from other groups like the Igbo-Aro, and launched war expeditions to capture slaves from other communities. The Ékpè society helped to organise and spread the Efik slave trade, playing a role in the establishment of the old town slave centre at Old Calabar. Efik traders often sold enslaved people to British merchants, with the British slave trade from the Bight of Biafra being most intense between 1700 and 1807, at which point the British Empire banned the trade in slaves.

In Cuba, African slaves were divided into groups termed naciones (nations), often based on their port of embarkation rather than their own ethno-cultural background. Those slaves originally sold at Old Calabar became known as the Carabalí nation. Those included in this category came from a range of ethnic backgrounds, including Ibo, Bibí (Ibibio), Iyó, and Ekoi. In Cuba, traditional African deities perhaps continued to be venerated within clubs and fraternal organizations made up of African migrants and their descendants. The most important of these were the cabildos de nación, associations that the establishment regarded as a means of controlling the Afro-Cuban population. These operated as mutual aid societies and organized communal feasts, dances, and carnivals. It was within the Carabalí cabildos of Havana and Matanzas that knowledge of the Ékpè secrets and rituals were preserved. Although Efik people were transported to various parts of the Americas through the Atlantic slave trade, it was only in Cuba that there is evidence for the Ékpè society being reconstituted in any form.

=== Formation and early history ===
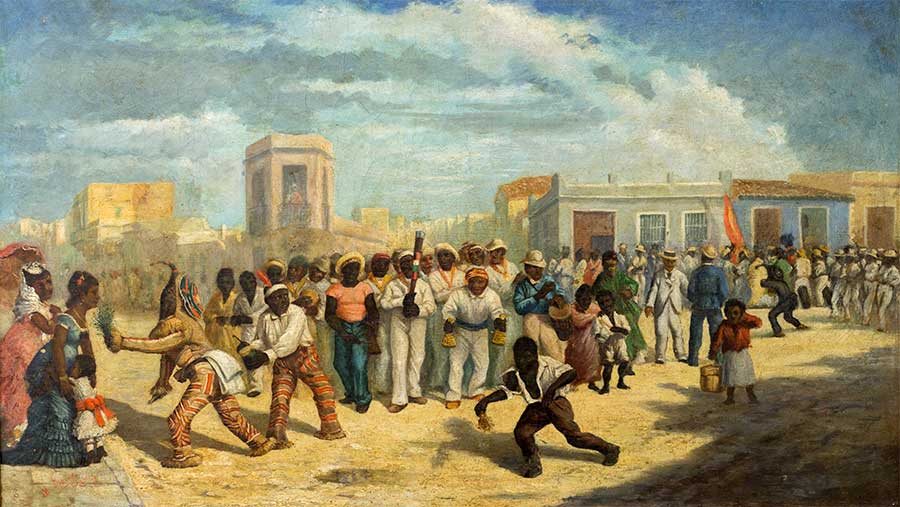
Painting of Nañigo celebration in Cuba, 1878

The first Abakuá group was formed in Regla in 1836. This group was commonly known as Efik Buton, although other names used were Acabatón and Acuabutón; its members were called the Belenistas. The term Efik Buton probably derived from Obutong, the Efik settlement in Old Calabar that English speakers had called "Old Town." The group's formation was supported by the Regla's Cabildo de Nación Carabalí Brícamo Appapá Efí. According to an account from the 1880s, members of that Regla Cabildo pushed for Abakuá's creation as a means of passing their secrets to black creoles without actually admitting them into the Cabildo itself.

From there, the society spread to Havana, Matanzas, and Cárdenas. By 1881, there were 77 juegos in Havana's nine districts and six in nearby Regla and Guanabacoa municipalities. Two distinct branches emerged, the Efí and the Efó.

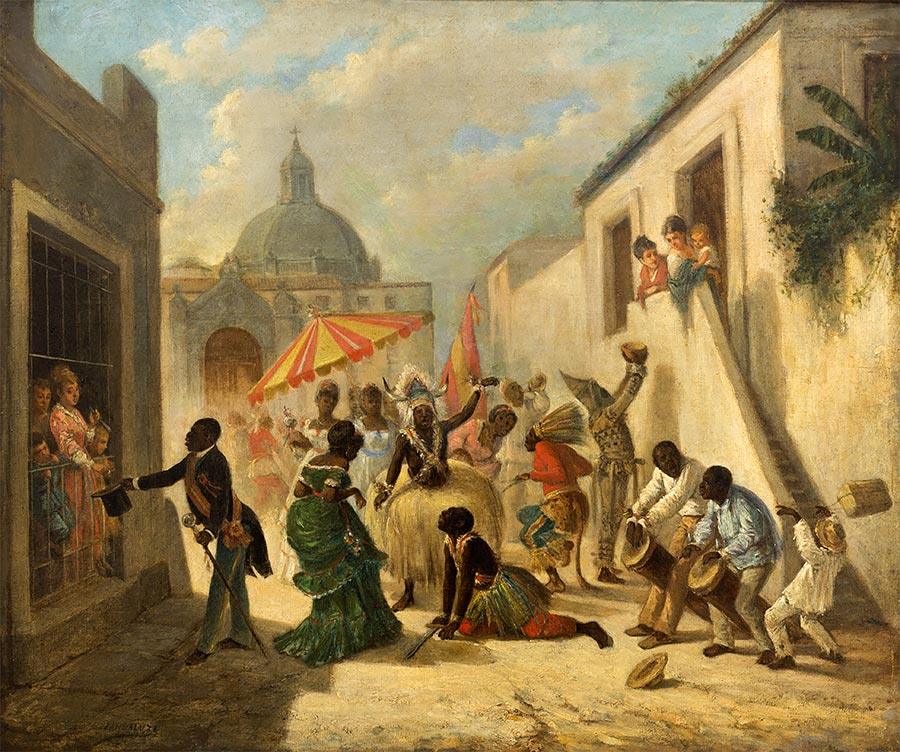
Painting including an Ireme dancer (right) at a Three Kings Day celebration in Havana

For over twenty years, Efik Buton and those in its lineage prohibited white and mulatto membership, seeking only those deemed to be of pure African blood. By 1863, the Havana Efó branch was reported as having many white members. This demographic change reflected the social and economic changes in the cities of west Cuba in this period; the ruling elites had encouraged the mass migration of white Europeans to Cuba in the mid-19th century to offset the numerical dominance of an Afro-Cuban population. Although established among Afro-Cubans, it came to let in mulattos and whites. As Ivor Miller noted, the requirements for admission became not race, but "a demonstration of a moral character as well as discretion." The whites who joined were predominantly working class but also included high-ranking military figures, aristocrats, and politicians. The Efó branch, and also some Efí lodges, also admitted mulattos and those from additional migrant communities, including Canary Islanders, Chinese, and Filipinos.

In the 1860s, the society began to adopt the public display of Roman Catholic symbols.

Abakuá came to control the stevedore, transportation, and local manufacturing labor in Cuban port cities between the 1870s and 1942.

The society faced persecution in the 19th and early 20th centuries. Throughout the mid-19th century, the group was commonly rumoured to be involved in criminal activity. In Cuban society, the term Ñáñigos gained negative connotations, equivalent of English terms like "sorcerer" and "delinquent". Rivalries between different lodges sometimes escalated into violence, contributing to the society's negative reputation in Cuban society. For many in the Cuban establishment, Abakuá was regarded as being "linked to a culture of poverty and marginalization". At the same time, some politicians in the republic courted the society's support, even printing electoral material in Efik.

Abakuá members were among the Cubans who migrated to Florida in the late 19th century, many of them fleeing the Spanish government's crack down against perceived rebels. There were many society members among the Cuban tobacco rollers who settled in Ybor City by the 1880s, for instance. Although they gathered for communal celebrations, these U.S.-based members could not establish lodges nor perform initiations in Florida. The tradition's Cuban leaders have never sanctioned the establishment of a lodge outside Cuba itself, concerned that such American lodges may operate autonomously of the mother lodges from which they have been spawned. Cuban carnival activities in Florida nevertheless sometimes generated false claims that Abakuá was active in the U.S.

Substantial research into Abakuá was conducted by the Cuban anthropologist Lydia Cabrera, who worked in Havana and Matanzas between the 1930s and 1950s. In the 1960s she moved to Miami, where she published several books on the society. The 20th-century work of Cabrera and Harold Courlander reflected a growing scholarly usage of the term "Abakuá", replacing the previously common term ñañiguismo. Many group members embraced this term over Ñáñigos because of the latter word's associations with criminality in Cuban society.

=== After the Cuban Revolution ===
The Cuban Revolution of 1959 resulted in the island becoming a Marxist–Leninist state governed by Fidel Castro's Communist Party of Cuba. Committed to state atheism, Castro's government took a negative view of Afro-Cuban religions; it viewed Abakuá as a criminal and counter-revolutionary organisation, with state persecution of Abakuá continuing through the 1960s and into the 1970s. Following the Soviet Union's collapse in the 1990s, Castro's government declared that Cuba was entering a "Special Period" in which new economic measures would be necessary. As part of this, it selectively supported Afro-Cuban traditions, partly out of a desire to boost tourism. Abakuá's relationship with the tourist industry helped to improve the society's reputation in Cuba.

Abakuá ritual objects first began to be publicly displayed in anthropological and criminological museums. By the mid-1960s, they could also be found in institutions like Cuba's National Museum of Fine Arts. The 1960s also saw the increasing use of Abakua music and dances in secular performances, something that angered some society members.

In 1998, a group of Abakuá initiates in Miami formed a lodge they named the Efí Kebúton Ekuente Mesoro, a reference to the first Cuban lodge. Abakuá leaders in Cuba refused to recognise the legitimacy of this group, both because it did not have a sponsor and because several of its leaders had previously been suspended from their Cuban lodges for disobedience. Subsequently, in the early 21st century, Abakuá members in the United States met with Nigerian and Cameroonian Ékpè members based in the same country and helped establish growing links between the related societies. In 2001, an Abakuá performance troupe appeared at a meeting of the Efik National Association of USA in Brooklyn, New York. For the 2003 Efik National Association meeting, two Abakuá leaders traveled to Michigan to meet with the Obong of Calabar. In 2004 two Abakuá musicians traveled to Calabar, Nigeria to perform at the International Ékpè Festival. In 2007, an Abakuá group and an Ékpè troupe from Calabar performed onstage together in Paris, France.

== Reception and influence ==
Abakuá has been demonised by colonial and state authorities throughout its history. The ethnomusicologist María Teresa Vélez suggested that Abakuá had been "discriminated against and persecuted more than other Afro-Cuban religious practices". Prejudice against the group has been widespread both before and after the Cuban Revolution, and successive Cuban governments have seen the society's juegos as potential centres for resistance to the government and establishment.

Fernández Olmos and Paravisini-Gebert noted that the society had exerted a "profound and pervasive creative influence" on Cuban music, art, and language. From at least the late 19th century, there has also been an artistic tradition of using Abakuá imagery as a symbol of the Cuban nation as a whole. This can be seen not only in Cuba itself but also among artists in Florida, where it is evident in the work of Cuban diasporic artists like Mario Sánchez, José Orbein, and Leandro Soto. Soto for instance used an Abakuá mask as a symbol for Cuba in a video-installation performance piece created in the early 21st century.
