= Cabasa =

Percussion instrument

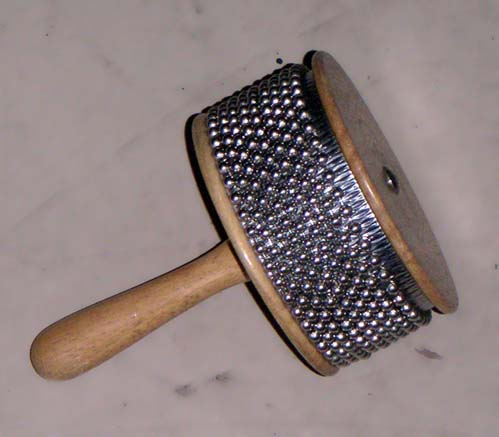
- A metal afuche-cabasa

Percussion instrument
- Classification: Percussion
- Hornbostel–Sachs classification: 112.1 (Shaken idiophones or rattles – The player executes a shaking motion)
- Inventor: Martin Cohen
- Developed: Modern version 1960s, based on a traditional instrument of the same name

Builders
- Latin Percussion, Meinl Percussion, many others

The cabasa, similar to the shekere, is a percussion instrument that is constructed with loops of steel ball chain wrapped around a wooden cylinder. The cylinder is fixed to a long, wooden or plastic handle.

The metal cabasa was created by Martin Cohen, founder of Latin Percussion. This company has built a more durable cabasa that they call an afuche-cabasa (pictured). It provides a metallic, rattling sound when shaken or twisted, similar to the sound of a rattlesnake. It is often used in Latin jazz, especially in bossa nova pieces. Precise rhythmic effects can be gained by the advanced player. The player places their non-dominant hand on the metal chain, to provide pressure, while holding the wooden handle with the other hand and twisting the instrument back and forth depending on the rhythmic pattern desired. In addition to Latin music, many band and orchestra pieces call for the cabasa.

The African original version of the cabasa is called agbe, and is constructed from dried oval or pear-shaped gourds with beads strung on the outer surface. There are many versions of this instrument, particularly in Latin music. Cabaça is used in Latin American dance. The cabaça is a natural or synthetic round or pear-shaped gourd covered with a network of beads and finishing in a single handle. This is compared to the metal version used in Latin jazz.

The instrument is frequently used in music therapy, particularly with individuals who have physical/neurological disabilities as it requires minimal hand movement to produce a sound. The sound produced by the individual can then be reinforced by the music therapist, which builds neurological connections between hand movement and hearing the sound, in turn encouraging more fluent hand movements. Modern adaptations of this instrument include Meinl Percussion foot pedal.
