= José Mangual Jr. =

Puerto Rican salsa percussionist (born 1948)

- Also known as: "El Campanero Mayor"
- Born: January 11, 1948; Manhattan, New York City, U.S.
- Genres: Afro-caribeña; Latin jazz; salsa; son cubano; pachanga
- Occupations: Musician; composer; producer
- Instruments: Percussion; vocals
- Years active: 1963–present
- Labels: True Ventures Inc.; Velvet; Fania
- Formerly of: Héctor Lavoe; Willie Colón; Rubén Blades; Mongo Santamaría; Tony Pabón; Milton Cardona
- Relatives: José Mangual Sr. (father); Luis Mangual (brother)

José Mangual Jr. (born January 11, 1948) is an American salsa percussionist, singer, and composer, best known for his recordings with Willie Colón and Héctor Lavoe during the 1960s and 1970s salsa boom in New York. Afro caribena

== Early career ==
Jóse Mangual Jr. was born on January 11, 1948, in Manhattan, New York City. He is the son of Puerto Rican bongosero José Mangual Sr. (1924–1998), also known as "Buyú", and is brother to Luis Mangual, who is a well-known salsa percussionist as well. Both he and his brother were born and raised in East Harlem. At age 15, Jóse Jr. began performing.

In 1968, Willie Colón hired Mangual to play bongos and sing background vocals for Héctor Lavoe in Colón's orchestra, and in 1969, he played bongo and cowbell on Colón and Lavoe's album Cosa Nuestra, which was the first album of Colón's to go gold. In 1973, Mangual co-authored the song "San Miguel".

In 1974, he produced and recorded José Mangual* & Carlos "Patato" Valdez* – Understanding Latin Rhythms Vol. 1, which was an instructional album on the New Jersey–based label Latin Percussion, owned by Martin Cohen, also a percussion instrument manufacturer. Conceived as an instructional album for aspiring musicians, it featured his father, José Sr., on the bongos; Patato Valdéz on the conga; Bobby Rodríguez on bass; and Manny Oquendo on the timbales.

In 1975, Mangual played bongo on Hector Lavoe's album La Voz. When Lavoe set off on his solo career, Mangual became his musical director. In 1977, Mangual started the record label True Ventures Inc. His first album on the label was titled A Tribute to Chano Pozo (inspired by Cuban percussionist Chano Pozo), and it included "Campanero" and "Cuero 'Na Ma", songs which have been covered by numerous artists. This was also the first album in which Mangual sang lead vocals. In 1977, he played bongos and maracas and was in the chorus ensemble on Rubén Blades and Willie Colón's album Metiendo Mano, and the next year, on their album Siembra.

== Later career ==
In the early 1980s, he signed with Velvet Records and increased in popularity in Latin American, European, and Asian markets. Mangual's talent as a percussionist, singer, composer, and musical director led him to record with artists including Ray Barretto, Rubén Blades, Herb Alpert, Dizzy Gillespie, David Byrne, Celia Cruz, Juan Luis Guerra, Ramón Orlando, Mario Bauzá, the Fania All-Stars, Junior González, Ismael Miranda, Louie Ramirez, Mongo Santamaría, among others.

In 1995, he would be called upon again as percussionist for Rubén Blades and Willie Colon's fifth and final album Tras La Tormenta.

From 1998 to 2012, Mangual formed and recorded with a group he founded called Son Boricua with Jimmy Sabater. In 1998, he won the ACE Award for best new Latin release for Son Boricua along with Jimmy Sabater who sang lead vocals on the album.

In 2007, he recorded vocals and coro for the soundtrack of the movie El Cantante, starring Marc Anthony and Jennifer Lopez.

== Discography ==
- José Mangual* & Carlos "Patato" Valdez* – Understanding Latin Rhythms Vol. 1 (Latin Percussion, 1974)
- Tribute to Chano Pozo (True Ventures Inc., 1977)
- Buyú (Turnstile, 1977)
- Pa' Bailar y Gozar (Velvet, 1979)
- Mangual (a.k.a. Ritmo y Sabor) (1980)
- José Mangual Jr., Lita Branda, Melcochita: Con Sabor (1980)
- "Time Will Tell" "Que Lo Diga El Tiempo..." (Campanero, 1981)
- Que Chévere (1982)
- Soneros Con Clase (1982)
- Lo Que Traigo es Salsa (1983)
- Latin Rhythm & Moods (Tropical Budda, 1984)
- Al Fin, y Al Cabo (Combo, 1984)
- Dandole Color (Vedisco, 1984)
- Son Boricua (1998)
- Dancing with the Gods (Bailando con los Santos) (2003)
- José Mangual Jr. – Dancing with the Gods (Bailando Con Los Santos) (Chola Musical Productions, 2012)

== Filmography ==
- El Cantante (soundtrack, 2007)

== See also ==
- Salsa music
- Charanga (Cuba)
- Afro-Cuban jazz
