= El Pito (I'll Never Go Back to Georgia) =

Single by Joe Cuba Sextet

from the album "Estamos Haciendo Algo Bien!" (We Must Be Doing Something Right!)
- Released: 1966
- Recorded: 1965
- Genre: Boogaloo
- Label: Tico Records
- Songwriters: Jimmy Sabater, Joe Cuba
- Producer: Pancho Cristal

"El Pito (I'll Never Go Back to Georgia)" is a 1965 Latin and soul fusion or Latin boogaloo song, co-written by Jimmy Sabater and Joe Cuba. It was popularized by the Joe Cuba Sextet, featuring Cheo Feliciano on vocals. In many instances, the song is referred to as being exclusively Joe Cuba's.

The song is characterized for its bilingual lyrics and urban sound, all part of the Latin boogaloo music style of the 1960s in New York City.

== Writing and composition ==
The "I'll Never Go Back to Georgia" chant was taken from Dizzy Gillespie's intro to the Afro-Cuban jazz standard "Manteca". The piece refers to racial tensions in the United States.

Jimmy Sabater Sr., has said however: "None of us had ever been to Georgia." David Gonzalez from the New York Times writes: ″'Oye, y ese pito!' Hey, that whistle! That was the first line to "El Pito," which was always followed by five quick toots. In the mid-'60s those five notes heralded an emerging musical movement. From El Barrio to the South Bronx, hipsters in knit shirts and Caesar haircuts went around whistling, clapping and singing, "I'll never go back to Georgia! I'll never go back!" Of course, the farthest south most of these guys had ever been was Delancey Street to buy their Playboy loafers.″

Nevertheless, Jimmy Sabater was "struck both by the sentiment and the way the cadence of the line perfectly fit a clave rhythm. And in 1965, when the song came out, the political timing was just right to make "El Pito" a rare crossover hit for Latin and black audiences".

== Madison Square Garden performance ==
According to a story published by record label Fania, to celebrate the success of the song, five thousand whistles were handed out during a concert at New York's Madison Square Garden in 1967. At the time, the Sextet was touring with the James Brown show. During the performance, the group ″hurled thousands of whistles from the stage, causing a mild uprising with people running down the aisles trying to get their hands on a Joe Cuba "El Pito" whistle.″ After the incident, James Brown reportedly decided never to tour with Joe Cuba again.
