= Tock-tock =

Tock-tock or tock tock can refer to

- Claves - a percussion instrument consisting of a pair of short, thick dowels.
- Steelpan - a pitched percussion instrument, also known as a steel drum
- Any of several types of beetle of the family Tenebrionidae
