= José Mangual Sr. =

Puerto Rican Latin jazz & salsa percussionist (1924–1998)

Jose Mangual Sr.
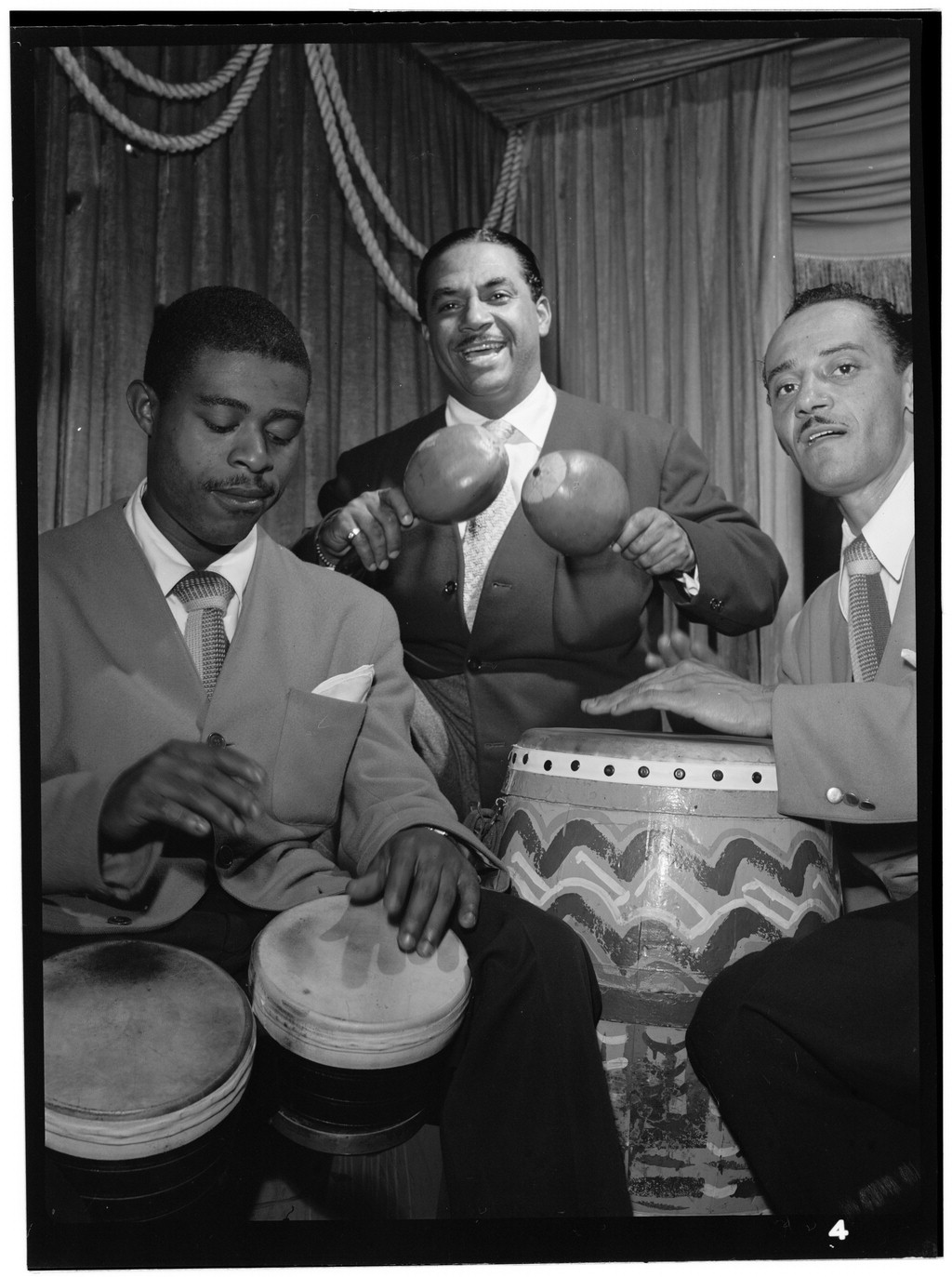
- José Mangual Sr. on bongos (left), alongside Machito on maracas and Carlos Vidal on conga, at the Glen Island Casino, New York, 1947

Background information
- Also known as: "Buyú"
- Born: March 18, 1924; Juana Díaz, Puerto Rico, Puerto Rico, U.S.
- Died: September 4, 1998 New York City, U.S.
- Genres: Afro-Cuban jazz; salsa; Son montuno; guaguancó; guaracha; bolero
- Occupation: Musician
- Instrument: Bongos
- Years active: 1938–1997
- Labels: Turnstyle; Latin Percussion; Caiman
- Children: José Mangual Jr.; Luis Mangual

Jose Mangual Sr. (March 18, 1924 – September 4, 1998) was a Puerto Rican percussionist world-renowned for his bongo drum performances and recordings during the 1940s and 1950s with artists such as the Machito Orchestra, Charlie Parker, Buddy Rich, Flip Philips, Abbie Lane, and Nancy Ames. All About Jazz wrote, "He set a standard in bongo playing and was considered by many to have the greatest sound on the instrument." He is the father of José Mangual Jr. and Luis Mangual who are both well-known salsa singers and percussionists. Both were born and raised in East Harlem.

== Early career ==
Mangual began playing percussion at the age of 10, and in 1938, he moved to New York at the age of 14. In 1952, he began playing timbales and percussion for Machito's Orchestra.

== Later career ==
In the 1950s, Mangual played with the "godfather of modern-day salsa", Arsenio Rodríguez, and with Latin jazz pioneer Cal Tjader. Thereafter, Mangual joined Erroll Garner's band with whom he traveled the world, playing jazz for international audiences. During this time, he also performed and recorded with Cannonball Adderley, Sarah Vaughan, and Herbie Mann. During the mid-1950s and 60s, Mangual appeared on numerous albums, including Count Basie's April in Paris (1957); Miles Davis's Sketches of Spain (1960), in which he played castanets; Dizzy Gillespie's Talkin' Verve (1957); Tito Puente's Babarabatiri (1951); Willie Bobo's Spanish Grease (1965); Gato Barbieri's Viva Emiliano Zapata (1974); as well as on multiple Charlie Parker compilations.

He also performed with Dexter Gordon, Carmen McRae, Jorge Dalto, Stan Getz, Louis Jordan, Ray Charles, Tito Rodríguez, Xavier Cugat, and Chano Pozo.

In the 1970s, Mangual recorded two instructional albums, Buyú and José Mangual* & Carlos "Patato" Valdez* – Understanding Latin Rhythms Vol. 1, with Carlos "Patato" Valdez, for the drum maker Latin Percussion (LP).

In 1986, he co-wrote and recorded Los Mangual – Una Dinastia with his sons, José Jr. and Luis. In 2001, he was posthumously inducted into the International Latin Music Hall of Fame.

== Discography ==
- Buyú (Turnstyle, 1977)
- José Mangual* & Carlos "Patato" Valdez* – Understanding Latin Rhythms Vol. 1 (Latin Percussion, 1977)
- Los Mangual – Una Dinastia (Caiman, 1986)

== Filmography ==
- The Thrill of Music (1946)

== See also ==
- Afro-Cuban jazz
- Salsa music
