= Catá =

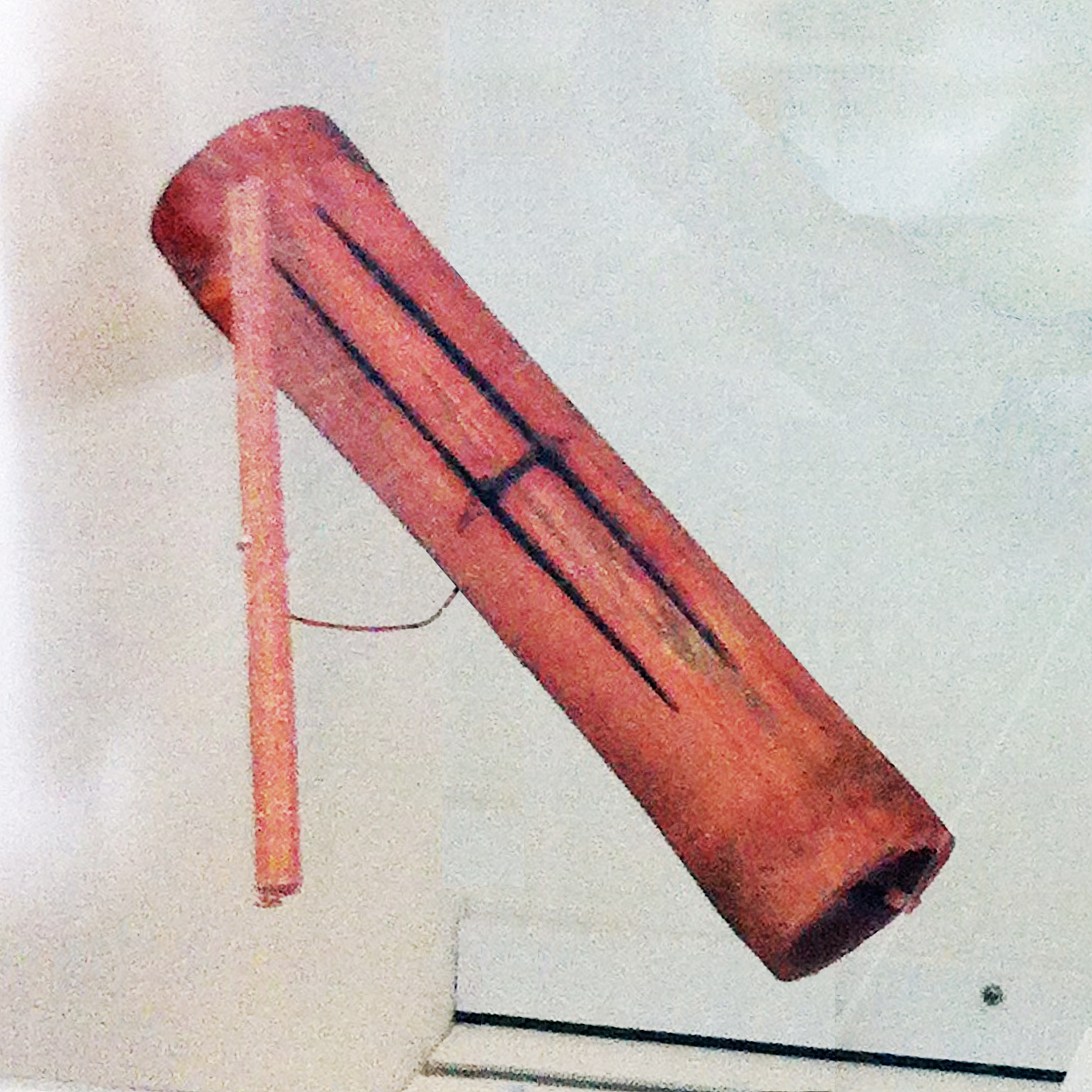
- Catá (1980s-90s) used by Ramón “Mongo” Santamaría (Smithsonian Museum)

Percussion instrument
- Other names: Guagua
- Classification: Idiophone
- Hornbostel–Sachs classification: 111.231 (Directly struck idiophone, individual percussion tube)

Related instruments
- Claves, wood block, jam block

The catá or guagua is a Cuban percussion instrument which originated in the eastern region of the island. It is classified as a directly struck idiophone, traditionally made out of a hollowed tree trunk, which the player hits with wooden sticks or mallets. The resulting sound is dry and penetrating, similar to that of the claves, although with a different pitch. Of Congolese origin, it is an essential instrument in tumba francesa, yuka and some rumba ensembles.

== Use ==
The catá is primarily used in the tumba francesa tradition from eastern Cuba, which originated in the early 19th century. Its role in tumba francesa is to provide the main rhythm in the form of a cinquillo pattern. In fact, in Saint Domingue (current Haiti), from where the tumba francesa was imported, the word catá (of Bantu origin), denoted this rhythm. The catá is considered a reconstruction of idiophones from the Congo region, brought by slaves to the Caribbean.

The catá has been incorporated into Cuban rumba, where it "locks" with the claves, establishing the clave rhythm. In the context of rumba, the term guagua is more common, as in guaguancó, or palitos, which refers to the sticks. Nonetheless, these have been replaced by the caja china (wood block) or the more durable jam block, made of plastic. The guagua is also used in yuka, one of the oldest genres of Afro-Cuban percussion.

Musicologists from Guantánamo, such as Ramón Gómez Blanco, hypothesize that the catá pattern was adapted by the marímbula players in changüí, highlighting the common Bantu roots of tumba francesa and changüí.

== See also ==
- List of Caribbean idiophones
