= Mike Freeman (jazz musician) =

American jazz vibraphonist and composer (born 1959)

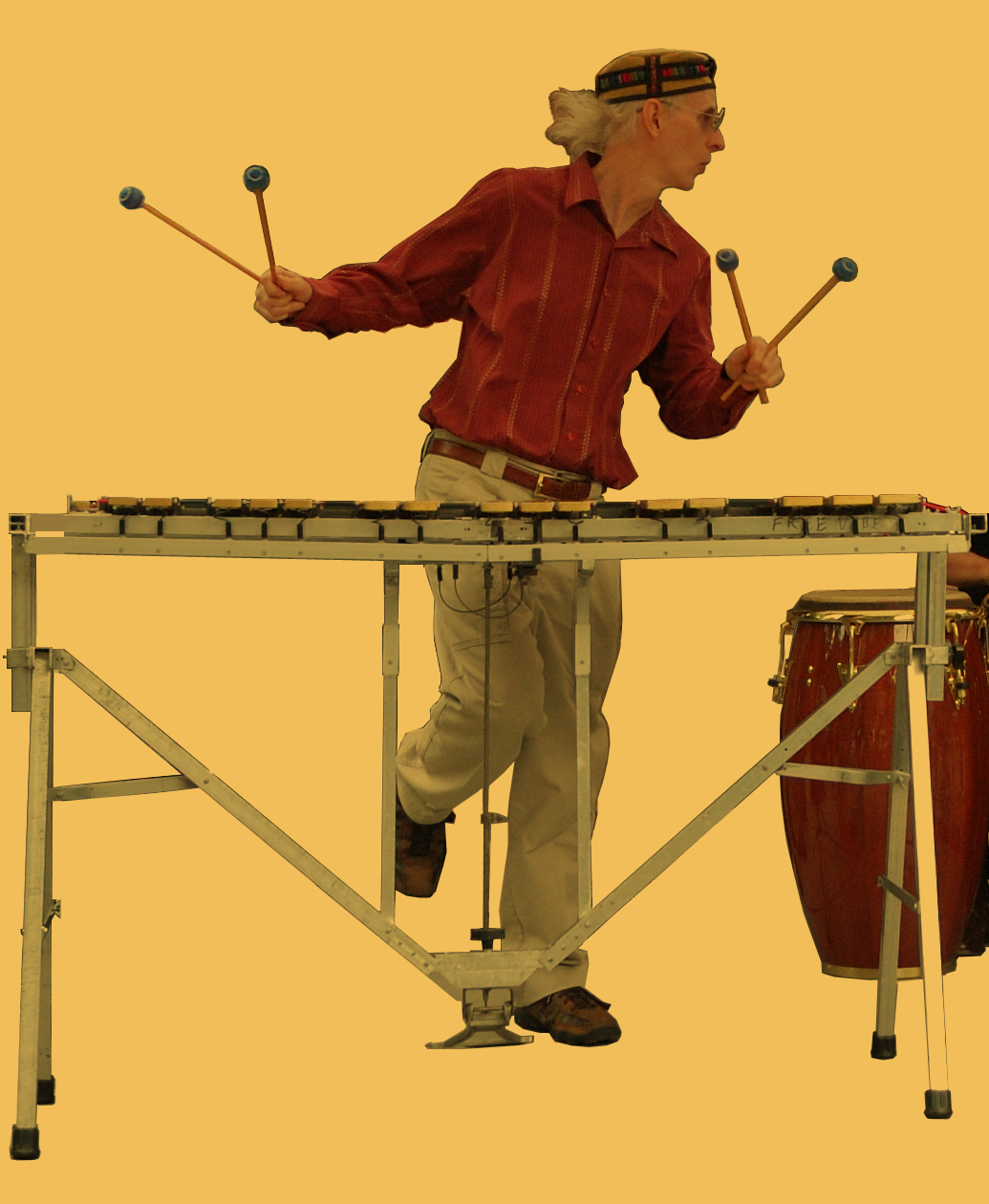
- Mike Freeman performing with ZonaVibe in New York City, 2013

Background information
- Born: 1959 (age 66–67); Omaha, Nebraska, U.S.
- Genres: Jazz, Latin jazz, salsa
- Occupation: Musician
- Instruments: Vibraphone, marimba
- Website: jazzvibe.com

Mike Freeman is an American jazz vibraphonist and composer from Omaha, Nebraska based in New York City's Hell's Kitchen neighborhood of Manhattan since 1981.

== Early life and education ==
Freeman started learning drums at age six and began playing professionally at age thirteen. At twelve, he began playing the vibraphone, and by fifteen, he was a percussionist for the Omaha Symphony Orchestra under conductor Thomas Briccetti. During his last year of high school, he began traveling to Chicago to study with renowned percussionist and veteran studio musician Bobby Christian. He graduated from DePaul University with a Bachelor of Music composition in 1981. In New York, he studied with composer and arranger Hale Rood.

== Career ==
Freeman has performed in North America, Europe, the Azores, Caribbean, and South America. In 1985, he did an extensive tour of Portugal, sponsored by the American Embassy and the Fulbright Foundation. The tour was arranged by Rui Martins, director of the Hot Club of Portugal, and USIA Cultural Affairs Officer Wally Keiderling. In addition to Lisbon, he performed in areas of the country rarely visited by American musicians and not previously visited by a vibraphone player. In Guarda, Portugal, he received the medal of the city.

His eight recordings of original music gained national and international attention and extensive radio airplay, charting on jazz, contemporary jazz, and world music radio as well as airing on syndicated radio programs.

A four time Lower Manhattan Cultural Council Creative Engagement grant recipient, Freeman produced Hell's Kitchen Vibe-Centric, 2025; Boricua Blues, 2022; Hell's Kitchen Soul Sauce, 2021; and Latin Music in Hell's Kitchen, A History, 2019. At Manhattan Plaza he produced and organized two benefit concerts for musicians affected by devastating hurricanes. One following Hurricane Katrina in 2005 benefitting Tipitina's Foundation and the other after Hurricane Maria in 2017 benefitting the Jazz Foundation of America. He wrote a series, spanning more than a decade, of commissioned compositions and arrangements for the Chicago Symphony Orchestra's Percussion Scholarship Program and in 2014 was commissioned by drummer and educator Ed Uribe to write arrangements for China's national percussion curriculum that were performed by members of the Shanghai Symphony Orchestra at the Shanghai Symphony Hall.

Freeman is also known for performing and recording with several acclaimed Latin groups including percussionist Ray Mantilla from 2002 until Mantilla's passing in 2020. Good Vibrations on Savant Records was Jazzweek's top Latinjazz recording on radio in 2006. He performed and recorded with Jose Mangual Jr's Son Boricua featuring Jimmy Sabater (an architect of Boogaloo) from 2003 to 2023, with Julio Salgado from 2000 to 2020 and with Lucho Cueto's all-star group Black Sugar. He also performed with the Spanish Harlem Orchestra (directed by Oscar Hernandez) at Madison Square Garden and with Willie Villegas's Joe Cuba Sextet both with legendary sonero Cheo Feliciano.

== Discography ==
=== As leader ===
- Mike Freeman ZonaVibe Circles In A Yellow Room, VOF, 2025
- Mike Freeman ZonaVibe Venetian Blinds, VOF, 2018
- Mike Freeman ZonaVibe Blue Tjade, VOF, (Dec.) 2015
- Mike Freeman ZonaVibe The Vibesman, VOF, 2012
- Mike Freeman ZonaVibe In The Zone, VOF, 2007
- Mike Freeman Wiggle Stomp, VOF, 2000
- Mike Freeman & Spellbound Street Shuffle, Best Recordings, 1991
- Mike Freeman & Spellbound, 1985

=== As featured side musician ===
- Metropolitan Jazz Octet The Bowie Project, 2023, Origin Records
- Julio Salgado Mis Pasos, Tropique Recordings, 2021
- Ray Mantilla Rebirth, Savant Records, 2020
- Ray Mantilla High Voltage, Savant Records, 2017
- Luis Blasini All Natural, 2014
- William Mendoza Latin Heartbeat Orchestra El Regreso, 2014
- Los Hermanos Mangual Sabor y Swing, 2012
- Manny Padilla & Baya Allstars Para Mi Madre, 2011
- Mark Holen Zambomba Three Gold Coins, 2009
- Lucho Cueto's, Black Sugar Estamos Azucar, Latin Sound Records, 2007
- Ray Mantilla Good Vibrations, Savant Records, 2006
- Son Boricua Fabuloso 70's, Cobo Music, 2004
- Mark Holen Zambomba Stretching The Truth, 1997
- Damon Short Worry Later The Music of Monk, 1981

=== As session musician ===
- Kirsten Thien, Delicious, Screen Door Records, 2010
- Capathia Jenkins & Lou Rosen, South Side Stories, Rosecap Productions, 2006
- Stephanie Pope, Now's the Time to Fall in Love, Jerome Records, 2001
- The Manhattan Transfer, Swing, Atlantic records, 1997
- Don Sebesky, Foxwoods TV commercial, The Wonder of it All, featuring John Pizzarelli Jr., 1999
- As You Like It, Shakespeare Theater, Washington D.C., 1997
- Peer Gynt, Shakespeare Theater, Washington D.C., 1998
- Northeast Local, Lincoln Center Mitzi Newhouse Theater, NYC, 1996
- Titus Andronicus, Shakespeare-in-the-Park, NYC, 1989
