= Jim Gailloreto =

American composer and saxophonist (born 1960)

- Born: 1960 (age 65–66); Chicago, Illinois
- Genres: Jazz, Classical, Contemporary
- Occupations: Saxophonist, Composer, Bandleader
- Instruments: Tenor Saxophone, Soprano Saxophone
- Website: http://www.jazzstringquintet.com

Jim Gailloreto (born 1960) is an American saxophonist, composer, and group leader from Chicago whose string arrangements were heard on Kurt Elling's Grammy Award–winning CD Dedicated To You.

== Biography ==
Rooted in modern post-bop, Jim Gailloreto has been active on the Chicago jazz and creative music scene since the 1980s. A prolific composer and arranger he has eight recordings as a leader to his credit with three instrumentally diverse groups, and has recorded as a sideman with several notable artists and record labels. Chicagojazz.com describes Gailloreto's compositions as "genre bending".

On his Jazzformation and The Insider recordings, Gailloreto's tenor saxophone is heard with a more conventional small jazz ensemble of guitar, piano, bass, and drums while his Jazz String Quintet recordings feature his soprano sax improvisations backed by a string quintet. Each of these string quintet recordings features standout compositions by Gailloreto along with guest singers Kurt Elling, Patricia Barber, and Cheryl Wilson. Gailloreto's tenor sax also leads the Metropolitan Jazz Octet having taken the reins from Tom Hilliard, his former professor at DePaul University, 57 years after the group was founded. Hilliard left Gailloreto the group's music library when his health began to fail. The music sat in Gailloreto's basement for years before he resurrected the MJO in 2014. The octet format of the MJO features a small big band, a standard jazz rhythm section of piano, bass, and drums with alto, tenor, and baritone saxophones, trumpet, and trombone. Gailloreto along with saxophonist John Kornegay added charts to the library, which was largely written by Hilliard from the 1950s through the 1980s, and recorded the first new MJO recording The Road to Your Place in 2018.

Chameleon-like as a player, Gailloreto is equally at home performing jazz, blues, fusion, funk, classical, and Latin. He's performed and recorded for singers Patricia Barber and Kurt Elling on Blue Note Records, performed the Chicago premier of Marc Anthony Turnage's Scorched with the Chicago Symphony Orchestra and John Scofield, recorded with New York Latinjazz vibraphonist Mike Freeman, guitarist John McLean, pianists Jeremy Kahn and Fred Simon, and vocalist Grazyna Auguscik. Gailloreto has performed five times at the Chicago Jazz Festival with various ensembles.

Gailloreto graduated DePaul University in 1981 with a bachelor's degree in music composition having studied with George Flynn, and received a master's degree in music composition from Northwestern University in 1983 having studied with Alan Stout. He's a recipient of the New Works: Creation & Presentation Program Grant from Chamber Music America and was recognized in Jazziz Magazine's Woodwinds on Fire jazz select disc.

Gailloreto is an associate professor of music at Roosevelt University's Chicago College of Performing Arts.

== Discography ==
=== As leader ===
- Metropolitan Jazz Octet The Bowie Project featuring Paul Marinaro, 2023, Origin Records
- Metropolitan Jazz Octet It's Too Hot For Words featuring Dee Alexander, 2019, Delmark Records
- Metropolitan Jazz Octet The Road to Your Place, 2018
- Jim Gailloreto's Jazz String Quintet Pythiad featuring Cheryl Wilson, 2017
- Jim Gailloreto, Jazzformation, self-produced, 2012
- Jim Gailloreto Jazz String Quintet American Complex featuring Patricia Barber, Origin Classical, 2010
- Jim Gailloreto's Jazz String Quintet featuring Kurt Elling, Naim label, 2006
- Jim Gailloreto, The Insider, Wide Sound, 2003

=== As featured side musician ===
- Kurt Elling, The Beautiful Day, OKeh/Sony, 2016
- Mike Freeman ZonaVibe, Blue Tjade, VOF, 2015
- Mike Freeman ZonaVibe, The Vibesman, VOF, 2012
- Alison Ruble, Ashland, Origin, 2010
- John McLean, Better Angels, Origin, 2007
- Patricia Barber, Mythologies, Blue Note Records, 2006
- John Moulder, Trinity, Origin, 2005
- Jeremy Kahn, Most of a Nickel, 2005
- Grazyna Auguscik, Lulajze, 2005
- Kurt Elling, Man in the Air, Blue Note Records, 2003
- Fred Simon, Open Book, Columbia, 1991
- Kelly Brand, A Dream in a Stone, KOCH Jazz, 1995

=== Arranger ===
- Kurt Elling, Dedicated To You, 2009 - *Grammy Award Winner

== Compositions ==
They Fall, 2014, String Quartet, Soprano Saxophone, Bass & Voice

The Pythiad, 2014, String Quartet, Soprano Saxophone, Bass & Voice

Improvisational Suite (18 min.), 2013

- "No. 2"
- "No. 3"
- "No. 4"

"As of Yet" (6.0 min.), 2013, Cello, Soprano Saxophone & Voice

Sea Songs (40 min.) William Ferris Choral, 2011, String Quartet, Soprano Saxophone & Choir

- "Sea Shells No.1"
- "Languid Fingers"
- "Sea Shells No.2"
- "Wild Nights"
- "Sea Shells No.3"
- "Water's Music"
- "Sea Shells No. 4"
- "Ebb and Flow"

American Complex (25 min.) Origin Classical, 2009

- "Soliloquy"
- "Lullaby"
- "Incantation"
- "Sermon"

Origin Classical

- "Bad Clowns" (9 min.), 2009

Naim Label,

- "Justina with Strings" (20 min.), 2006
- "Shadow Puppets" (3.5 min.), 2006
- "Spare Change" (17 min.), 2006
- "Universal Soul" (5 min.), 2006
- "Admit One" (3 min.), 2006

=== Arrangements ===
Paulinho Garcia (string quartet and rhythm)
Bossa Nova 50 Anniversary, 2010

- "A Ra", Joao Donato
- "Bahia", Ari Barroso
- "Chega de Saudade", Antonio Carlos Jobim
- "Manhe Carnaval", Antonio Carlos Jobim
- "Ronco da Culca", Joao Bosco

Kurt Elling's Grammy Award-winning CD “Dedicated to You”

- "My One And Only Love", Robert Mellin/Guy Wood (6 min.), 2009 string quartet, bass and vocal
- "Nancy With The Laughing Face", Jimmy Van Heusen/Phil Silvers (6 min.), 2009, string quartet, vocalist and rhythm section

Origin Classical

- "Honeysuckle Rose", Fats Waller (4 min.), 2009, cello and soprano saxophone
- "Round Midnight", Thelonious Monk (6 min.), 2009, violin and soprano saxophone
- "Well You Needn't", Thelonious Monk (5 min.), 2009, string quartet & soprano saxophone and guitar
- "Wind Song" (5.5 min.) 2009

Symphony Center

- "Say it (Over And Over Again)", Frank Loesser/Jimmy McHugh (5 min.), 2009, string quartet, vocalist and rhythm section
- "Because of You", Arthur Hammerstein/Dudley Wilkinson (2.5 min.), 2008, cello and soprano saxophone
- "Bye Bye Black Bird", Ray Henderson (6.5 min.), 2008, string quartet, bass, soprano saxophone & vocal
- "My Funny Valentine", Richard Rogers/Lorenz (5 min.), 2008, string quartet, bass, tabla and vocal

Naim Label

- "Infant Eyes", Wayne Shorter (6.5 min.), 2007, string quartet and soprano saxophone
- "Fair Weather", Kenny Dorham (5 min.), 2006, string quartet, bass, soprano saxophone & vocalist
- "Giant Steps", John Coltrane (5 min.), 2006, string quartet and soprano saxophone, Patricia Barber
- "Witch Hunt", Wayne Shorter (9 min.), 2006, string quartet, soprano saxophone and vocalist

Hartstring

- "You Are Too Beautiful", Richard Rogers/Lorenz (3.5 min.), 2006 string quartet vocalist and rhythm section

Chicago Jazz Festival

- "You Don't Know What Love Is", Gene de Paul/Don Raye (7 min.), 2006, string quartet, vocalist and rhythm section

Rob Parton's Ensemble 9

- "Beatrice" (6 min.), 2006
- "Foot Prints" (6 min.), 2006, alto, tenor, br, 2 trumpets, bn & rhythm

Bill Russo's Chicago Jazz Ensemble

- "Street Magic" (7 min.), 2005

Escola de Samba, 2005

- "Corcovado", Antonio - Carlos Jobim, string quartet and rhythm section

Ingrid Graudins and Kurt Elling, 2005

- "Something Good", Oscar Hamerstein, string quartet & vibes
