= Bongo drum =

Afro-Cuban drum

Bongo
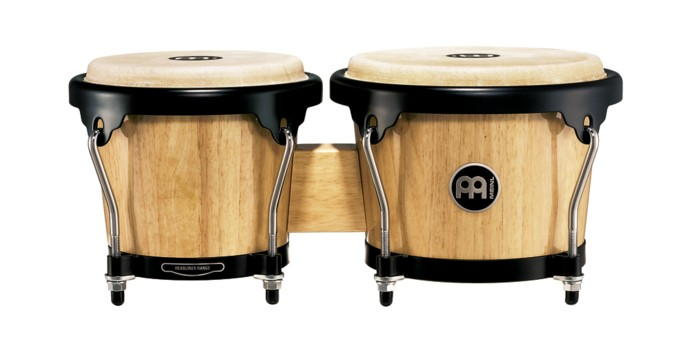

Percussion instrument
- Other names: Bongos; bongo drum
- Classification: Percussion
- Hornbostel–Sachs classification: 211.251.2 (Sets of single-skin conical drums)
- Developed: Late 19th century in Cuba

Related instruments
- Bokú; ekué; conga; timbales

Bongos playing a cumbia beat

Bongos (Spanish: bongó) are an Afro-Cuban percussion instrument consisting of a pair of small open bottomed hand drums of different sizes. The pair consists of the larger hembra (lit. 'female') and the smaller macho (lit. 'male'), which are joined by a wooden bridge. They are played with both hands and usually held between the legs, although in some cases, as in classical music, they may be played with sticks or mounted on stands.

Bongos are mainly employed in the rhythm section of son cubano and salsa ensembles, often alongside other drums such as the larger congas and the stick-struck timbales. In these groups, the bongo player is known as bongosero (or bongocero) and often plays a continuous eight-stroke pattern called martillo (lit. 'hammer') as well as more rhythmically free parts, providing improvisatory flourishes and rhythmic counterpoint.

Bongos originated in eastern Cuba at the end of the 19th century, possibly from a pair of larger drums such as the bokú. These older, larger bongos are known as bongó del monte and played in changüí. The smaller bongos used in son cubano were popular across Cuba by the 1910s and reached the concert halls of the eastern United States in the 1930s. By the 1940s, bongos and congas were sharing the stage as son ensembles grew in size and Latin music began to cross-pollinate with jazz and other genres. During the second half of the 20th century, bongos began to be played in a wide variety of genres, from bachata to Latin rock.

== Construction ==
Bongo drums are about 20 centimetres (8 in) high and have diameters of approximately 20 centimetres (8 in) and 25 centimetres (10 in). The shells of the drums and the bridge (the small block that joins them) are usually made of wood, although fiberglass is also common. The heads are typically made of calfskin and attached to the shells via steel hardware that enables their tuning (lug tuning). Originally, metal tacks were used, so the skins had to be tightened by heating the skins with a flame and loosened with water or by striking them vigorously. This method of tuning is still used for the traditional bongos used in changüí. Therefore, Fernando Ortiz places the original bongó in the category of tambores de candela (flame-tuned drums), along with bokú, yuka, conga, bembé and smaller drums, since these were all tuned with the flame of an oil lamp.

== Technique ==
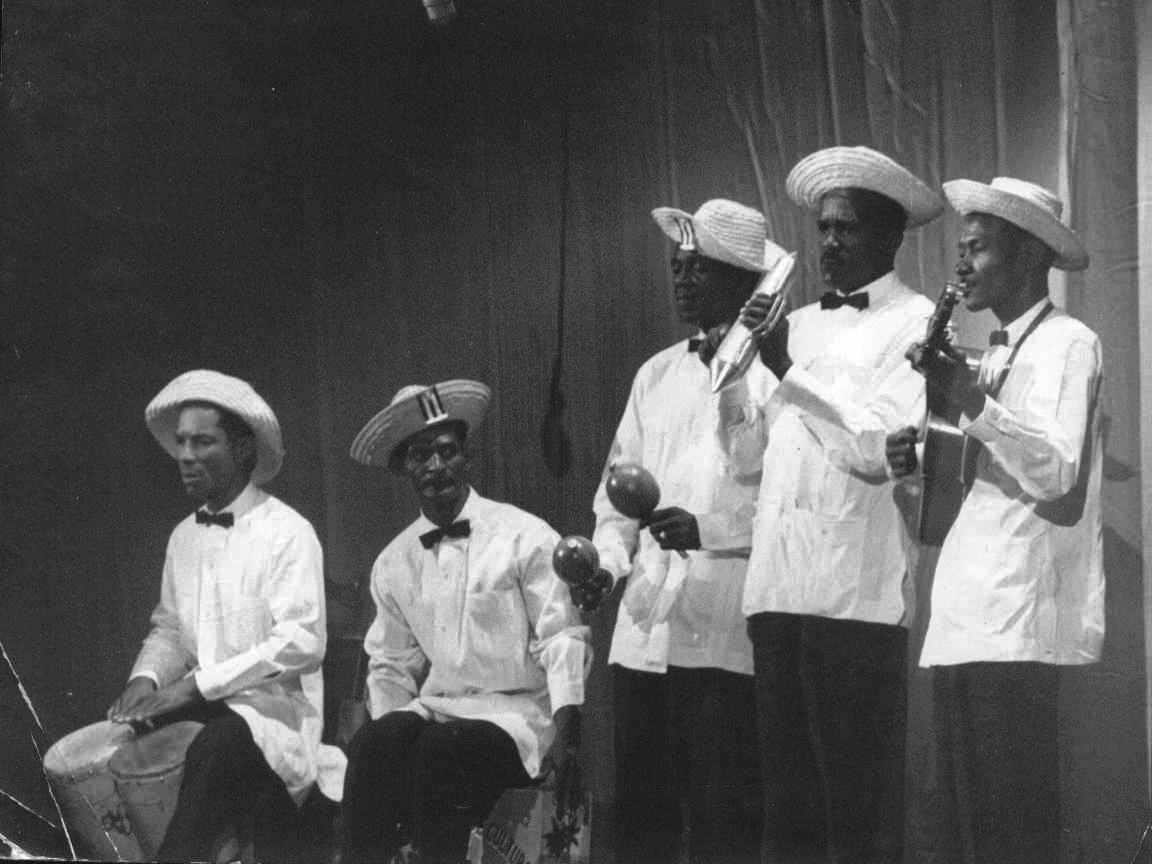
Grupo Changüí de Guantánamo in 1962. The bongosero (left) is playing bongó de monte, which is much taller than the standard bongó

Bongo drums produce relatively high-pitched sounds compared to conga drums, and should be held behind the knees with the larger drum on the right when right-handed. It is most often played by hand and is especially associated in Cuban music with a steady pattern or ostinato of eighth-notes known as the martillo (hammer). They are traditionally played by striking the edge of the drumheads with the fingers and palms. The glissando used with bongó de monte, called bramido (howl), is done by rubbing the third finger, supported by the thumb, across the head of the drum. Usually, this is done during the climax of a changüí performance. The finger is sometimes moistened with saliva or sweat before rubbing it across the head, but many players use beeswax instead.

When playing son cubano and other popular genres, the macho is on the left and the hembra on the right. In changüí, the bongó de monte is positioned the opposite way. Playing patterns are also different in changüí, where the bongó does not follow a steady beat. Instead, it usually marks offbeats and beat four while improvising. Thus, the playing technique in changüí resembles that of the congas (moreover, their pitch is often lower than both bongos and congas). This reflects it origin, since the bongó del monte evolved from pairs of bokús, a larger drum from eastern Cuba similar to the conga.

Bongos can also be played on a stand, as is the case with concert orchestras and bands. In classical music performances, bongos are usually struck with mallets or drumsticks. Examples of pieces featuring bongos include Ionisation by Varèse (1931), Le Marteau sans maître by Boulez (1955) and In seinem Garten liebt Don Perlimplin Belisa by Fortner (1962). Steve Reich's 1971 piece Drumming features four pairs of carefully tuned bongos played with drumsticks.

== History ==
=== Origin and etymology ===
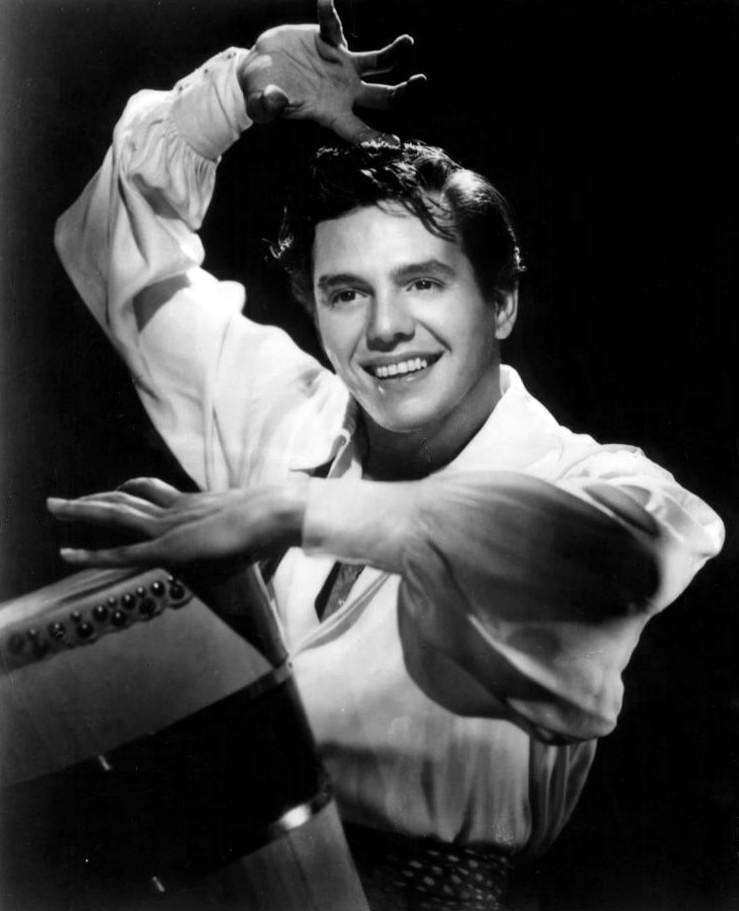
Desi Arnaz playing a bokú circa 1940. His father had banned the bongos 15 years earlier. The bokú is the most likely ancestor of the bongos

The origin of the bongo is largely unclear. Its use was first documented in the eastern region of Cuba, the Oriente Province, during the late 19th century, where it was employed in music styles such as nengón, changüí, and their descendant, the son cubano. According to Fernando Ortiz, the word bongó derived from the Bantu words mgombo or ngoma, meaning drum. He hypothesizes that the word evolved through metathesis and by similarity with another Bantu word, mbongo. According to Ortiz's early 20th century informants, the large bongó del monte (mountain bongo) used in changüí was the ancestor of the smaller bongó used in son cubano and salsa.

As explained by eastern Cuban informants to Benjamin Lapidus, the oral tradition among changüí musicians in Oriente is that the bongó originated as a replacement for pairs of bokús that were slung over the player's knee. Bokús are tall drums popular in the eastern provinces, particularly during carnival processions, and featured in early changüí groups. Eventually, these drums were cut in half into bongos. This may explain why the bongó del monte used in changüí is larger than the bongos used in son. In Holguín, similar drums which are considered possible ancestors of the bongó are known as tahona, which might have a been a generic word for drum in Cuba and also refers to an unrelated music genre. Other generic terms that have been used to refer to bongos across eastern Cuba include tahonitas, tambora, atambora and tumba.

The bokú/tahona origin of the bongos agrees with the generally agreed notion held by Afro-Cuban cultural historians that the bongo derives from Bantu drum models from Central Africa, noticeable in the open bottoms. The strong historical presence of Africans from the Congo/Angola region in eastern Cuba (where the bongo first appeared) makes such an influence possible, as does the widespread use of the term bongó/bonkó among Bantu speakers. Moreover, Central African/Congo influences are also documented in both son cubano and changüí, and initially the development of the bongo drum was in parallel with these genres. From such conceptual African drum models, the bongo developed further in Cuba itself, and some historians state that the attaching of the two drums was a later invention that took place in Cuba. Therefore, the instrument has been described as "African in concept but Cuban in invention". Ortiz's hypothesis for the origin of the bokú is that their tall unusual shape was the result of a purposeful avoidance of "African-looking" drums by Afro-Cuban musicians at a time when most drums of that sort were banned.

Less supported hypotheses for the origin of the bongos, largely based on their superficial similarity to other twin drums, include the Cuban pailas and timbales (descended from European tympani), the Arab nakers, the North African tbilat (called "African clay bongos"), the Indian tabla, etc.

=== Evolution and popularization ===
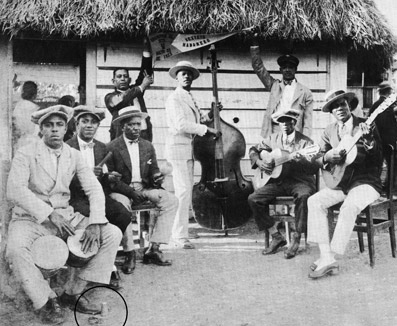
Sexteto Habanero in 1925. First on the left is Agustín Gutiérrez, the bongosero. His tuning lamp is on the ground (circled)

The bongo entered Cuban popular music as a key instrument of early son ensembles, quickly becoming—due to the increasing popularity of the son—"the first instrument with an undeniable African past to be accepted in Cuban "society" circles". This is attested, for example, in poems by Nicolás Guillén. As son evolved and distanced itself from its precursor, the changüí, so did the bongos. The bongos used in changüí, known as bongó de monte, are larger and tuned lower than their modern counterparts, have tack-heads instead of tunable hardware, and play in a manner similar to the lead conga drum (quinto) and other folkloric lead drum parts. Unlike modern son, changüí never extended its popularity beyond eastern Cuba, and hence its bongos remain a rare sight. It is commonly accepted that the son reached Havana partly as a result of the arrival of musicians members of Cuba's ejército permanente (permanent army), which brought music from eastern Cuba with them. Among the first known bongoseros to enlist in the ejército permanente in Santiago de Cuba was Mariano Mena.

During the sexteto era, son groups began performing and touring more than ever before, and for the first time, recordings were being made. It was in this context that the first great innovators of the bongo made their mark, and unlike their predecessors, their names were not lost in time. Of particular note were Óscar Sotolongo of the Sexteto Habanero and José Manuel Carriera Incharte "El Chino" of the Sexteto Nacional, the two leading groups of the 1920s and '30s. Sotolongo himself would later leave the Habanero and direct his own group, the Conjunto Típico Cubano. His replacement was Agustín Gutiérrez "Manana", who is widely considered one of the most influential bongoseros, partly due to his condition as an Abakuá member, which allowed him to develop techniques based on the ekué (secret drum) drumming of such society. In 1930, Sotolongo's son, Andrés Sotolongo replaced Gutiérrez in the Habanero. Decades later, at 82 years of age, Andrés Sotolongo was recorded for the Routes of Rhythm documentary playing alongside Isaac Oviedo.

"The Cuban government has prohibited the beating of the African bongo drum. The restriction carries heavy penalties on the ground that the monotonous reverberations induce a state of savagery in ignorant listeners and a state of irritation in others."

— Life magazine, 1929

In 1929, bongos and other drums were banned by the Cuban government. This prohibition extended that of 1925, which outlawed congas in the context of street carnivals, but not the comparsas themselves. Ironically, this original ban was enacted by the mayor of Santiago de Cuba, Desiderio Arnaz II, father of Desi Arnaz, who later popularized congas, bongos and bokús across America and the world. This repression of Afro-Cuban culture was denounced by poets in the Afrocubanismo such as Guillén, whose "Canción del bongó" (Song of the bongo) was published in 1931.

The 1930s saw an increase in the technical skill of bongoseros, as evidenced by Clemente "Chicho" Piquero, whose virtuosic performances inspired a young Mongo Santamaría to take up the instrument. (Note: Some musicians were able to effectively translate their technical skill into pure showmanship, as was the case with Lázaro Pla, known as Manteca, who toured with the Lecuona Cuban Boys in the 1940s and became an attraction in Havana in the 1950s. He later moved to Miami and released two albums as a leader in the 1970s.) By the early 1940s, Santamaría had become a master of the instrument, performing with the Lecuona Cuban Boys, Sonora Matancera, Conjunto Matamoros and Arsenio Rodríguez's "Conjunto Segundo" among others. Arsenio had pioneered the conjunto format by incorporating a tumbadora (conga drum) into the rhythm section and having the bongosero double on cowbell. Arsenio's long-time bongosero was Antolín "Papa Kila" Suárez, who is often cited as one of the greatest of his time along with Pedro Mena of the Conjunto Matamoros. Arsenio's group also helped break the barriers of race, which particularly affected bongoseros. For example, the Orquesta Casino de la Playa did not allow their black bongosero Ramón Castro to perform on stage, nor was Arsenio allowed on the tres. The Casino de la Playa would also feature bongosero Cándido Requena, who later joined the Conjunto Kubavana and Conjunto Niágara, and became one of Cuba's foremost makers of bongos and tumbadoras. Requena, as well as the Vergara brothers, were instrumental in the technological improvement of bongos and congas. Before the advent of mechanically tunable bongos and congas in the 1940s, both instruments used to be tuned with oil or kerosene lamps. The heat of the flame was used to contract the drumhead to achieve the desired sound.

Following the popularization of the tumbadora, Santamaría switched to the instrument, while remaining a close friend of bongosero Armando Peraza. Both moved to New York by 1950, bringing their music abilities with them. Among the bongoseros who stayed in Cuba were the aforementioned Chicho Piquero, who had become a close friend of Benny Moré in Mexico and became his Banda Gigante's bongosero back in Cuba. Also important during the 1950s were Papa Gofio of the Conjunto Rumbavana and Rogelio "Yeyo" Iglesias, the main bongo player in Havana's descarga scene. Over the course of the 20th century, the bongo spread throughout Latin America. In the Dominican Republic, the bongo became integral to bachata, a genre related to bolero that emerged in the 1960s.

=== In the United States ===
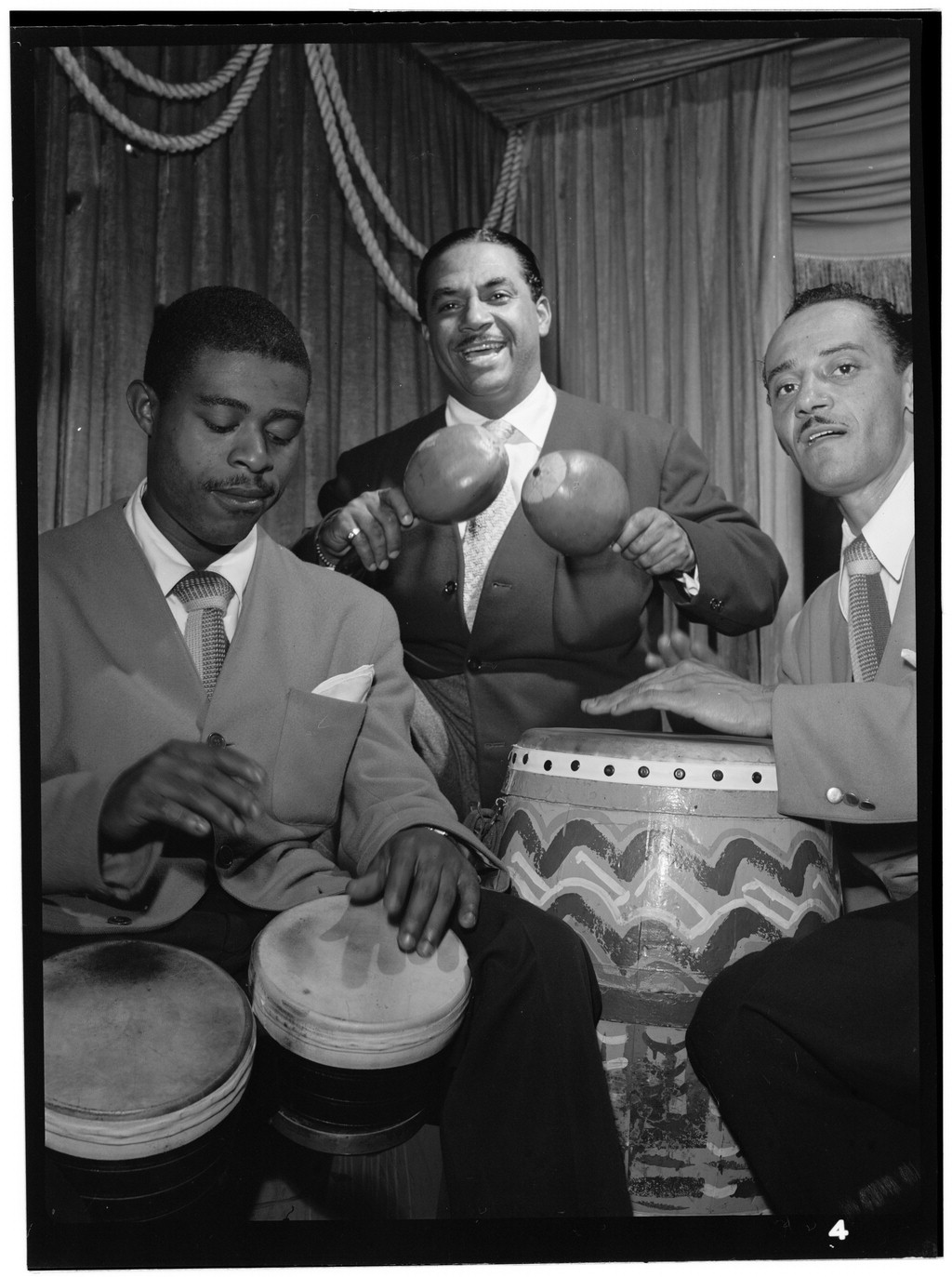
Jose Mangual, Sr. on bongos (left) alongside Machito on maracas and Carlos Vidal on conga at the Glen Island Casino, New York, 1947

In the 1920s, bongos were first played in the United States during the recording sessions of Cuban son ensembles such as Sexteto Nacional, which recorded in New York City for Columbia Records. Among the tracks recorded in their 1927 sessions was "Viva el bongó", a song about the instrument itself which—unlike the stylized Cuban son popular at the time—brought percussion to the foreground. Since these recordings were mainly sold in Cuba, they did not have any cultural impact in the US.

Things changed one Saturday afternoon in April 1930, when the Havana Casino Orchestra directed by Don Azpiazú debuted their live show at the Palace Theatre in New York. Featuring José "Chiquito" Socarrás on bongos, Don Azpiazú's successful performances and recordings of "El manisero" gave rise to a dance craze known as "rhumba" (in reality based on Cuban son) which led to the widespread use of the bongo among Latin bands in New York. In the early 1930s, Cuban orchestras proliferated in New York, featuring the bongo as key percussion instrument, including those directed by Antonio Machín, Alberto Socarrás, Pedro Vía, Antobal, Enrique Bryon, etc. However, apart from Chiquito Socarrás, who was also a singer, there were no bongoseros of renown and the instrument did not yet permeate American music styles.

Spearheaded by the iconic conguero Chano Pozo, the late 1940s saw an exodus of Afro-Cuban percussionists from Cuba to the United States. Among the leading bongoseros of Cuban origin in the United States were Armando Peraza, Chino Pozo (unrelated to Chano) and Rogelio Darias, who had a long career in Las Vegas and was known as the King of the Bongo. Many others, however, would become primarily conga players, such as Mongo Santamaría, Sabú Martínez and Cándido Camero.

The Latin music scene of New York, and the US in general, was primarily constituted by Puerto Ricans, and many influential bongoseros were Puerto Ricans who learned from Cubans. An early example is Rafael "Congo" Castro, who arrived in New York in 1924 and had a long career as a bongosero in Chicago until the 1980s. In New York, many Puerto Rican bongoseros would go on to join the pioneering Afro-Cuban jazz ensembles of the time such as Machito and his Afro-Cubans, whose singles "Tangá" and "Mango mangüé"—considered the first examples of the genre—featured José Mangual Sr. "Buyú" on bongos. Mangual's prolific career was continued by his sons José Mangual Jr. and Luis Mangual, who played in a variety of salsa groups in the 1970s. The two biggest Latin orchestras of the 1950s in New York, led by Tito Puente and Tito Rodríguez, were home to two generations of bongoseros represented by Johnny "La Vaca" Rodríguez and his son Johnny "Dandy" Rodríguez, of Puerto Rican ancestry.

Other Puerto Rican musicians who made a name for themselves on the bongos were Richie Bastar of El Gran Combo de Puerto Rico, Ralph Marzán of Johnny Pacheco's charanga, "Little" Ray Romero, Frank Colón and Roberto Roena. On the other hand, American master bongoseros include Jack Costanzo and Willie Bobo (of Puerto Rican origin), the latter more active on timbales. Other bongoseros who had more impact as timbaleros were Manny Oquendo, Orestes Vilató and Nicky Marrero. American novelty rock acts such as Preston Epps and Michael Viner's Incredible Bongo Band capitalized on the popularity of the instrument as well as its exotic and rhythmic qualities.
