= Son Boricua =

Latin dance music orchestra based in New York City

Son Boricua is a Latin dance music orchestra based in New York City, founded by Jose Mangual Junior. Lead singer was Jimmy Sabater until his death in 2012.

Their debut album was released in 1998. Their music is mostly salsa (Puerto-Rican style) and mambo, both original songs and covers. The meaning of the name - "Son" is a Latin genre (originally from Cuba), and "Boricua" means Puerto-Rican in Spanish.

AllMusic rated the band's self-titled debut album two and a half stars.

== Discography ==
- Son Boricua (Caiman Records, 1998)
- Musical A Cortijo-Rivera (Cobo, 2000)
- Mo-Jimmy Sabater Con Son Boricua (Cobo, 2001)
- Clasicos 60s (Cobo, 2002)
- Fabulosos 70s (Cobo, 2004)

== Orchestra members ==
- Founder, musical director and bongos: Jose Mangual Jr.
- Timbales and vocals: Jimmy Sabater
- Vocals: Frankie Morales
- Piano: Hiram de Jesus
- Congas: Papo Pepin
- Coros: Willie Amadeo (coros)
- Vibes: Sonny Rivera (vibes)
- Vibes: AJ Mantas
- Vibes: Mike Freeman
- Bass: Ray Martinez
- Bass: Ruben Rodriguez
- Bongos, congas: Ray Colon
