= Manteca (song) =

1947 Afro-Cuban jazz song by Dizzy Gillespie

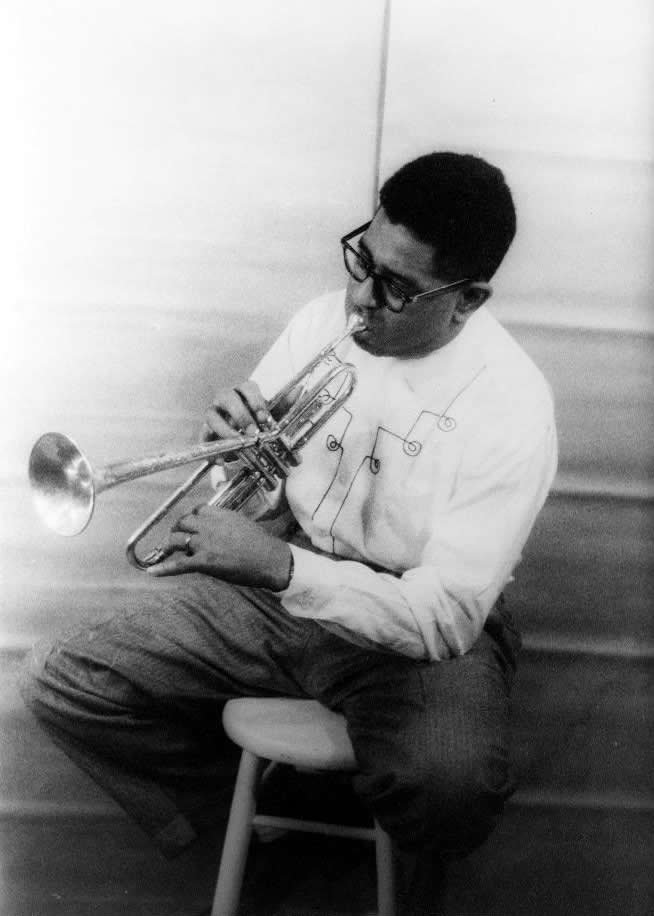
Dizzy Gillespie 1955

"Manteca" is one of the earliest foundational tunes of Afro-Cuban jazz. Co-written by Dizzy Gillespie, Chano Pozo and Gil Fuller in 1947, it is among the most famous of Gillespie's recordings (along with the earlier "A Night in Tunisia") and is "one of the most important records ever made in the United States", according to Gary Giddins of The Village Voice. "Manteca" is the first tune rhythmically based on the clave to become a jazz standard. In 2004, the song was selected for preservation in the National Recording Registry by the Library of Congress as being "culturally, historically or aesthetically significant".

== History ==
In 1947, Gillespie asked Mario Bauzá to recommend a Cuban percussionist for his big band. Bauzá suggested Pozo, a rough-living percussionist already famous in Cuba, and Gillespie hired him. They began to work Pozo's Cuban-style percussion into the band's arrangements.

The band was touring in California when Pozo presented Gillespie with the idea for the tune. It featured a bridge of two eight-bar trumpet statements by Gillespie, percussion patterns played by Pozo, and horn lines from Gillespie's big band arranger Walter "Gil" Fuller. According to Gillespie, Pozo composed the layered, contrapuntal guajeos (Afro-Cuban ostinatos) of the A section and the introduction, while Gillespie wrote the bridge. Gillespie recounted: "If I'd let it go like [Pozo] wanted it, it would have been strictly Afro-Cuban all the way. There wouldn't have been a bridge. I thought I was writing an eight-bar bridge, but after eight bars I hadn't resolved back to B-flat, so I had to keep going and ended up writing a sixteen-bar bridge."

The rhythm of the 'A' section melody is identical to a common mambo bell pattern:

Early performances of "Manteca" reveal that despite their enthusiasm for collaborating, Gillespie and Pozo were not very familiar with each other's music. The members of Gillespie's band were unaccustomed to guajeos, overly swinging and accenting them in an atypical fashion. Thomas Owens observes: "Once the theme ends and the improvisation begins... Gillespie and the full band continue the bebop mood, using swing eighths in spite of Pozo's continuing even eighths, until the final A section of the theme returns. Complete assimilation of Afro-Cuban rhythms and improvisations on a harmonic ostinato was still a few years away for the beboppers in 1947."

"Manteca" was first performed by the big band at Carnegie Hall on September 29, 1947; it was very well received. The big band recorded the tune on December 22, 1947, and in early 1948 they toured Europe for a few months, without including the piece in their set list. Instead, they featured the two-part tune "Cubana-Be/Cubana-Bop", recorded eight days before "Manteca", as their nod to Afro-Cuban jazz. Resuming touring in the Spring 1948, the band replaced "Cubana-Be/Cubana-Bop" with "Manteca" in their set list, augmented with Pozo's abakuá chants; audiences and critics responded strongly. The New Yorker and Life both printed pictorials and reviews of the band. Life wrote that Pozo was a "frenzied drummer", "shouting incoherently" in apparent "bop transport". DownBeat said in September 1948 that "Manteca" was performed "almost as a tribal rite", making a primitive statement. On October 9, 1948, the song was recorded as part of a show at the Royal Roost in New York. Gillespie responded to the crowd's amusement at Pozo's chanting by mimicking Pozo's chants himself, evoking laughter from the audience. This type of clowning was common to Gillespie's stage presence but it was in contrast to his serious effort to incorporate Afro-Cuban elements into jazz. On this recording, someone is heard playing the 3–2 son clave pattern on claves throughout a good portion of this 2–3 song. This recording is the last one Pozo made of "Manteca"; he was shot and killed in a Harlem bar two months later.

The Spanish word manteca (lard) is an Afro-Cuban slang term for heroin. Because mainstream jazz audiences are generally not aware of the innovations of Machito's band, "Manteca" is often erroneously cited as the first authentic Latin jazz (or Afro-Cuban jazz) tune. Although "Tanga" preceded "Manteca" by several years, the former is a modal descarga (Cuban jam), lacking a typical jazz bridge, or B section, and is not well known enough to be considered a jazz standard. When Gillespie first began experimenting with Afro-Cuban rhythms, the bebop pioneer called the subgenre cu-bop.

In some versions of the song, Gillespie is heard singing, "I'll never go back to Georgia", which the Joe Cuba Sextet would interpolate in their 1965 song "El Pito (I'll Never Go Back to Georgia)".

== Influence ==
In 1961, blues guitarist Bobby Parker had a Billboard Hot 100 hit with the song "Watch Your Step", which he wrote based on "Manteca". Parker said "I started playing the riff on my guitar and decided to make a blues out of it." Parker's song was performed on stage by the Beatles in 1961 and 1962, and, according to John Lennon, provided a musical basis for both "I Feel Fine" and "Day Tripper".

Nikolai Kapustin, a Russian jazz-classical composer, wrote a piano duet called "Paraphrase on Dizzy Gillespie's 'Manteca' " featuring the two main themes and a middle section with blues-style improvisations.

== Notable recordings ==
- Dizzy Gillespie – The Complete RCA Victor Recordings - recorded 1947-1949 (1995)
- Dizzy Gillespie – Afro (1954)
- Dizzy Gillespie – Dizzy Gillespie at Newport (1957)
- Red Garland – Manteca (1958)
- Phineas Newborn Jr. – A World of Piano! (1962)
- Oscar Peterson – Bursting Out with the All-Star Big Band! (1962), arranged by Ernie Wilkins
- Clare Fischer – Manteca! (1966)
- Cal Tjader – Soul Burst (1966)
- Ella Fitzgerald – Things Ain't What They Used to Be (And You Better Believe It) (1970)
- Dizzy Gillespie with the Kenny Clarke/Francy Boland Big Band – Live In '58 & '70 (1970 [2006])
- Cal Tjader – Cal Tjader Live at the Funky Quarters (1972)
- Quincy Jones – You've Got It Bad, Girl (1973)
- Art Pepper – Tokyo Debut (1977)
- Phish – A Picture of Nectar (1992)
- Maynard Ferguson – One More Trip to Birdland (1996)
- Bobby Sanabria Big Band – Afro-Cuban Dream: Live & In Clave!!! (2000)
