= Tahona =

- Stylistic origins: 18th century Afro-Haitian music and early tumbas francesas
- Cultural origins: Early 19th century in Oriente, Cuba
- Typical instruments: Tahona drums, tumbadoras, tambora, bimba, tragaleguas, hierros, chachá or maruga, claves, marímbula

Regional scenes
- Santiago de Cuba

Tahona, also spelled tajona due to its pronunciation or taona, is a secular style of Afro-Cuban music developed in the 19th century in Santiago de Cuba after the arrival of Haitian slaves following the Haitian Revolution. The name comes from the musical groups that performed it and from the drums they used. It is considered one of the oldest styles within the rumba complex, and its performance became rare by the 20th century.

== History ==
The word "tahona" initially described a type of single-headed hand drum with a body made of a wooden barrel and a goatskin head, larger than the tumbadora (conga drum). The ensembles, and ultimately the music itself, also adopted the term tahona. As a genre, tahona is considered a style of Cuban rumba, and together with yambú it is one of the oldest. However, it differs from the canonical rumba styles in the fact that it developed in the eastern part of Cuba, the Oriente Province, due to the immigration of Haitian slaves following the Haitian Revolution of the 1790s. Thus, tahona exhibits similarities to tumba francesa (another Afro-Cuban style imported by Haitians) and conga (a style of street music developed in Santiago de Cuba).

Initially, tahonas were holiday dances performed by the slaves and their descendants, later turning into "rural congas" (Afro-Cuban parades) performed during carnival celebrations. The instrumentation of these parades in the 1860s revolved around two tahonas often called huecos ("hollow"), which are tuned in high and low registers, and two tamboras (a bass drum also found in tumba francesa). The different tahona drums are called repique (drumroll) and fondo (background). When the tahona ensembles participated in carnival parades they added one or two tumbadoras, hierros (iron idiophones), trumpet and saxophone. According to Harold Courlander, in Matanzas, tahonas were performed on two tumbadoras, claves and marímbula. According to Fernando Ortiz, tahona ensembles emerged as a way of making tumbas francesas "portable", since the drums in tumba francesas were to large to be carried in street parades. He described tahona ensembles as containing three tahonas (one repique and two fondos), one tambora, one tragaleguas (another drum), a hierro, and a guamo (an aerophone made of a sea snail). Chachás (rattles) were also added as in tumba francesa. An additional bass drum called bimba, which is smaller but deeper than the tambora, was also played by tahona ensembles.

Tahona spread across Oriente to Alto Songo, La Maya and Ti Arriba. It was brought to Havana by a percussion ensemble of ñáñigos (Efik descendants in Abakuá societies) named "La Tajona". In the Havana neighborhood of Carraguao, the tahona became commonly performed on many festivities. Its popularity among bakers led many to believe that it was named after the Spanish tahona, i.e. bakery.

== Style ==
Like tumba francesa and rumba, tahona performances are percussion-driven and feature call and response singing between a solo singer and a chorus. Lyrics are typically about everyday life. There are different toques or types of tahona performances with distinct dances. Two toques (called pasos, steps) have survived:

- Paso de camino ("walking step"), which is slow.
- Paso de tahona ("tahona step"), which is faster. It is associated with three choreographies: hechacorral, bastones and cinta. The latter is also a toque found in tumba francesa. In fact, it was common for tahonas to sometimes dance el baile francés, i.e. the tumba francesa dance.
