= Bobby Parker (guitarist) =

American musician and songwriter (1937–2013)

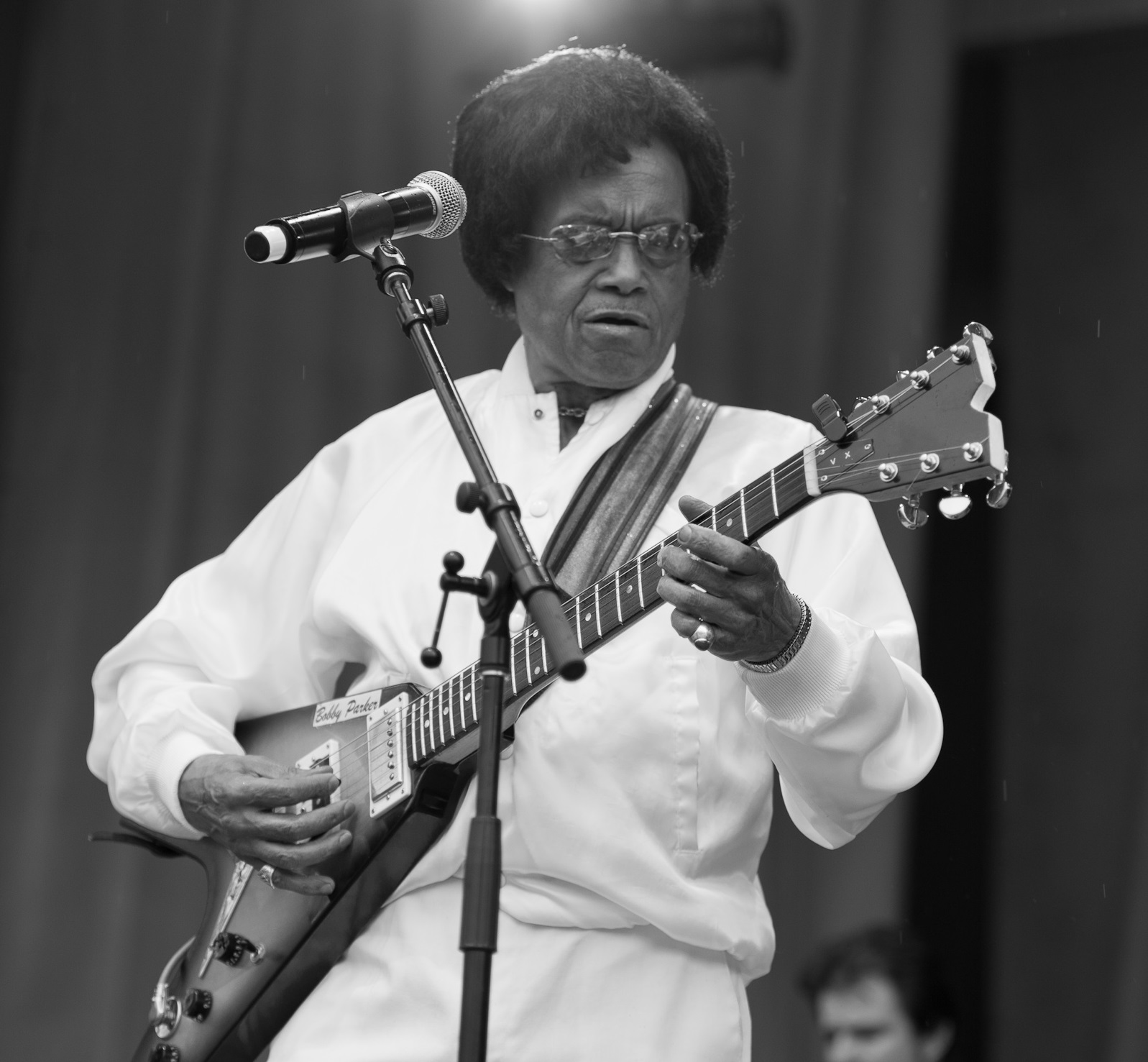

Background information
- Also known as: Bobby Parks
- Born: Robert Lee Parker; August 31, 1937; Lafayette, Louisiana, U.S.
- Died: October 31, 2013 (aged 76) Bowie, Maryland, U.S.
- Genres: Blues, blues rock
- Occupations: Guitarist, singer, songwriter
- Instruments: Guitar, vocals
- Years active: 1950s–2013
- Labels: Vee-Jay, Amanda, V-Tone, Sabu, Blue Horizon, Black Top

Robert Lee Parker (August 31, 1937 – October 31, 2013) was an American blues-rock guitarist, singer, and songwriter. He is best known for his 1961 song "Watch Your Step", a single for the V-Tone record label which reached the Billboard Hot 100; the song was performed by, and influenced, the Beatles among others.

== Biography ==
Born in Lafayette, Louisiana, but raised in Los Angeles, California, Parker first aspired to a career in entertainment at a young age. By the 1950s, Parker had started working on electric guitar with several blues and R&B bands of the time, with his first stint being with Otis Williams and the Charms. Over the next few years, he also played lead guitar with Bo Diddley (including an appearance on The Ed Sullivan Show) and toured with Paul Williams, Sam Cooke, Jackie Wilson, LaVern Baker, Clyde McPhatter, and the Everly Brothers. He first recorded, as Bobby Parks, with the Paul Williams band in 1956.

His first solo single, "Blues Get Off My Shoulder", was recorded in 1958, while he was still working primarily with Williams' band. The B-side, "You Got What It Takes", also written by Parker, was later recorded for Motown by Marv Johnson, but with the songwriting credited to Berry Gordy, Gwen Fuqua, and Roquel Davis. Parker told the Forgotten Hits newsletter in 2008:

I wrote 'You've Got What It Takes,' that was MY song. Even had the Paul Hucklebuck Williams band playing on it behind me... And then Berry Gordy just stole it out from under me, just put his name on it. And what could I do? I was just trying to make a living, playing guitar and singing, how was I going to go on and fight Berry Gordy, big as he was, and Motown Records? There wasn't really nothing I could do about it - it was just too big and I didn't have any way to fight them...

Parker also performed frequently at the Apollo Theater in Harlem, and in the late 1950s toured with Chuck Berry, Buddy Holly, and Little Richard. By the early 1960s, he had settled into living in the Washington, D.C., area and played at blues clubs there after having left Williams' band.

He recorded the single "Watch Your Step" for the V-Tone label in 1961. The song was written by Parker, inspired by Dizzy Gillespie's "Manteca" and Ray Charles' "What'd I Say". It reached no.51 on the Billboard Hot 100 in 1961, although it did not make the national R&B chart. It was later covered by several British acts including the Spencer Davis Group, Manfred Mann, Dr. Feelgood, Steve Marriott, Adam Faith, and also by Carlos Santana, and was performed by the Beatles in concerts during 1961 and 1962. The song's guitar riff inspired the introduction to the Beatles' 1964 hit single "I Feel Fine", and, according to John Lennon, also provided the basis for "Day Tripper". In relation to the Beatles' use of the riff, Parker said: "I was flattered, I thought it was a cool idea. But I still had, (in the) back of my mind, (the idea) that I should have gotten a little more recognition for that." Led Zeppelin also used the riff as the basis for their instrumental "Moby Dick".

With the success of the song, both in the United States and overseas, he toured the UK in 1968 and recorded his next single, "It's Hard But It's Fair" produced by Mike Vernon and released on Blue Horizon. Jimmy Page was a fan of the obscure bluesman and several years later, in the mid-1970s, wanted to sign Parker to Swan Song Records. Page offered an advance of US$2000 to fund the recording of a demo tape, but Parker never completed the recording, and an opportunity for Parker to be exposed to an international audience was lost. On January 1, 2012, Parker's "Watch Your Step" sound recording became Public Domain in Europe, due to the 50 year copyright law limit in the EU.

For the next two decades, Parker played almost exclusively in the D.C. area. By the 1990s, he started to record again for a broader audience. He recorded his first official album, Bent Out of Shape, for the Black Top Records label in 1993, with a follow-up in 1995, Shine Me Up. In 1993, he also was the headliner for the Jersey Shore Jazz and Blues Festival. Parker continued to perform as a regular act at Madam's Organ Blues Bar in Washington.

On July 12, 2004, Parker appeared and performed at the Montreux Jazz Festival, for a special night where Carlos Santana served as the musical director and was given the opportunity to present and perform with three of his favorite blues guitarists, which included Parker, Clarence “Gatemouth” Brown, and Buddy Guy, each performing their own full length set. All three concerts, including Parker's, were professionally recorded and filmed, released on a special edition 3DVD set entitled Carlos Santana: Presents Blues at Montreux 2004.

Parker died of a heart attack on October 31, 2013, at the age of 76.

== Discography ==
=== Singles ===
- "Suggie, Duggie, Boogie Baby" / "Once Upon a Time, Long Ago, Last Night" – (Josie, 1956) as Bobby Parks, with the Paul Williams Orchestra
- "Blues Get Off My Shoulder" / "You Got What It Takes" – (Vee Jay, 1958)
- "Stop By My House" / "Foolish Love" – (Amanda, 1959)
- "Watch Your Step" / "Steal Your Heart Away" – (V-Tone, 1961)
- "It's Too Late Darling" / "Get Right" – (Sabu, 1963)
- "Do The Monkey" / "Gimmie a Little Lovin'" – (Southern Sound, 1964)
- "Don't Drive Me Away" / "Keep Away from My Heart" – (Frisky, 196?)
- "It's Hard But It's Fair" / "I Couldn't Quit My Baby" – (Blue Horizon [UK], 1968)

=== Albums ===
- Bent Out of Shape (Black Top, 1993)
- Shine Me Up (Black Top, 1995)
- Soul of the Blues (Rhythm and Blues Records [UK], 2020) 2-CD overview of Parker's career
