= Martin Cohen (entrepreneur) =

American inventor and entrepreneur (born 1939)

- Born: January 28, 1939 (age 87); New York, United States
- Citizenship: American
- Education: City College of New York. Graduated 1961 Bachelor of Mechanical Engineering
- Engineering career
- Discipline: Entrepreneur, Mechanical engineer, Photographer
- Projects: Founder Latin Percussion, Founder congahead.com, Photographer capturing Salsa World musicians (1950s–present)
- Significant design: Percussion instrument inventions and improvements
- Significant advance: 8 Patents for Vibra-Slap, Cabasa/Afuche and other musical instrument designs
- Website: www.congahead.com

Martin Cohen (born January 28, 1939) is an American inventor, entrepreneur, mechanical engineer, and photographer, best known as the founder of the Latin Percussion company. He invented many percussion instruments used in the Salsa World, for which he was awarded 8 patents. Cohen has captured and documented thousands of Latin and jazz musicians and performances through photography, videos, and audio recordings.

== Latin Percussion Corp ==
Cohen was influenced by Cal Tjader, Candido, Herbie Mann, Jose Mangual, Chano Pozo and others at the Birdland Jazz Club in New York. He was unable to find authentic bongos to learn on due to the U.S./Cuba embargo of 1960. As a mechanical engineer by trade, he decided to construct them himself in the machine shop of Bendix, NJ with assistance from a local wood turner. He made bongos in his garage, and sold them through consignment stores. After the reputation of his business began to grow, he was approached by CBS house musician Specs Powell. At Powell's insistence, Cohen designed and sold him a stand for a pair of bongos, something which was not widely used or available at that time.

In August 1964, Cohen decided to quit his engineering job. At first, he found work making traps (some at least of his own design) for percussionist and Foley artist Carroll Bratman's firm Carroll Sound while also founding the company named Latin Percussion to sell his Latin percussion instruments. He made instruments in his basement until he opened a small factory in Palisades Park NJ in 1969, and then a larger facility in Garfield NJ . In order to meet demand and remain competitive, instrument production moved mostly to Thailand in the 1980s. Cohen became known for his high degree of personal involvement in his business, especially in actively managing and promoting endorsements and interactions with the users of his instruments. In 1979, Cohen assembled a "super group" of musicians featuring Tito Puente, Carlos "Patato" Valdez and Johnny "Dandy" Rodriguez called the Latin Percussion Jazz Ensemble, for the purpose of expanding the LP instrument market beyond the US by touring Europe, Japan, and the Montreaux Jazz Festival.

In 2002, Latin Percussion was sold to Kaman Music, who sold it to Fender in 2008, who then sold it to Drum Workshop in 2014.

== Photography ==
Cohen has photographically documented the Latin music scene through thousands of photos of musical stars such as Tito Puente, Celia Cruz, Patato, Carlos Santana, Samuel Torres, Issac Delgado, Jeremy Bosch, Porfi Baloa y Los Adolescentes, Los Van Van, Giovanni Hidalgo, and countless others.

A photo Cohen took of Tito Puente was issued as a United States Postage Stamp in 2011.

== Music recordings ==
As producer:

- Understanding Latin Rhythms, Vol 1, and Vol II Down To Basics feat. José Mangual Jr., José Mangual Sr., Carlos "Patato" Valdez, Ofelio Fernández, Manny Oquendo, and Milton Cardona (1974)
- Masacote Guaguanco feat. Jose Mangual Jr. (1975)
- Authority feat. Carlos "Patato" Valdez (1976)
- Buyú feat. Jose Mangual, Sr. (1977)
- Ready For Freddy feat. Carlos "Patato" Valdez (1977)
- My Own Image feat. Luis "Perico" Ortiz (1977)
- Drum Solos Vols. 1, 2, 3 feat. Eddie Montalvo and Charlie Santiago (1978)
- El Clavo feat. Ray Reyes, La Orquesta Refrain (1979)
- Alfredo - Alfredo de la Fé (1979)
- Dandy's Dandy, A Latin Affair - Johnny "Dandy" Rodriguez (1979)
- Just Like Magic - The Latin Percussion Jazz Ensemble feat. Tito Puente, Carlos "Patato" Valdez and Johnny "Dandy" Rodriguez (1979)
- Por Primera Vez - Conjunto Cache (1979)
- Bata y Rumba feat. Carlos "Patato" Valdez (1980)
- Live at Montreaux feat. Tito Puente, Carlos "Patato" Valdez and Johnny "Dandy" Rodriguez (1980)
- Montvale Rumba feat. Pedrito Martínez and "Little" Johnny Rivero (2002)
