= Affranchi (dance) =

Traditional folk dance from Saint-Domingue

The Affranchi is a traditional folk dance that originated in Saint-Domingue, the modern day Haiti.

== Etymology and history ==
During the colonial era, the word affranchi (meaning "manumitted") referred to free people of color, many of whom were of mixed French-African parentage. After the Haitian Revolution, when all slaves were freed, the term instead came to be used to describe the emerging light-skinned elite (the "Mulatto ascendancy").

Europeans in Saint-Domingue delighted in the affranchi entertainment. Both Europeans and Affranchis performed the varied line and square configurations and often made slaves dance to entertain colonial guests. Affranchi practices spread throughout Haiti and was accompanied by African-descended Kings and Queens. This highly regarded performance style and regal association was also taken to Cuba, Puerto Rico, the United States and to the rest of the diaspora in the late eighteenth century.

In the 1950s, Affranchi was revived by the National Troupe of Haiti, incorporating some hip-hop-esque movements and rhythms. Today in Haiti, one can still experience this art form at occasional country festivals, Vodou services, and as a tourist attraction.

== Description ==
The dance involved a series of straight-backed, held-torso, French style figures and then African-styled improvisation on the final set much like the tumba francesa that later emerged in Cuba by Haitian refugees escaping the Haitian Revolution, but was performed to the string and woodwind instruments, instead of the drums.

== See also ==
- Affranchi
- Gens de couleur libres
- Redoutes des filles de couleur
- Tumba francesa
