= Metropolitan Jazz Octet =

Tom Hilliard
- Born: January 20, 1930; Chicago, Illinois
- Died: March 28, 2006 (aged 76)
- Genres: Jazz
- Occupation(s): Saxophonist, Composer, Bandleader, Educator
- Instrument: Tenor Saxophone
- Website: https://www.metropolitanjazzoctet.com

Jim Gailloreto
- Born: 1960 (age 64–65); Chicago, Illinois
- Genres: Jazz, Classical, Contemporary
- Occupation(s): Saxophonist, Composer, Bandleader
- Instrument(s): Tenor Saxophone, Soprano Saxophone
- Website: http://www.jazzstringquintet.com

The Metropolitan Jazz Octet (MJO) was a group created in the 1950s by Chicago saxophonist and arranger Tom Hilliard that was revived in 2014 under the direction of Hilliard's student Jim Gailloreto.

== Early history ==
From the late 1950s to the 1980s Hilliard wrote many of the group's 150-plus charts. He also worked with Chicago’s top arrangers to expand the library. In 1959, the group recorded a single album on the Argo label called The Legend of Bix, a tribute to 1920s cornetist and composer Bix Beiderbecke. On the recording was Tom Hilliard - tenor sax, Ed Haley - trumpet, Ed Avis - valve trombone, Dave Edwards (musician) - alto sax, Ben Baileys - baritone sax, Angelo Principali - piano, Gerry Lofstrum - bass, Jim Gianas - drums.

A professor at DePaul University School of Music in the 1970s, Hilliard left the MJO library to his former student tenor saxophonist Jim Gailloreto when his health began to fail.

== Current History ==
The charts remained in Gailloreto’s basement for many years until 2014 (57 years after the group was formed) when Jim organized a group of musicians to read through some of the arrangements. Rehearsals took place at Andy's Music on Chicago's Northwest side. Realizing the treasure trove of music in this library, the group began performing and the Metropolitan Jazz Octet was brought back to life. In 2015 the group played a concert at Roosevelt University School of Music featuring the music from Tom Hilliard’s album The Legend of Bix.

From 2014 to the present while exploring and performing the original MJO music, current members of the group began adding new arrangements of their own. In 2018 the MJO recorded The Road to Your Place a compilation of original compositions and upended arrangements of classics by Gailloreto, and alto saxophonist John Kornegay. In addition to Gailloreto and Kornegay, the group includes Peter Brusen - Baritone Sax, Doug Scharf - trumpet, Russ Phillips - trombone, Bob Sutter - piano, Doug Bistrow - bass, Bob Rummage - drums.

It's Too Hot For Words, an MJO recording with singer Dee Alexander, celebrates Billie Holiday and was released on Delmark Records in 2019. It's Too Hot For Words received major jazz publication reviews including Jazztimes and Downbeat magazine, and was a Chicago Tribune pick for best jazz album in 2019.

The Bowie Project, with singer Paul Marinaro, reimagines the music of David Bowie and was released on Origin Records in 2023. This recording includes Ben Lewis on piano and adds vibraphonist Mike Freeman, who was also a student of Tom Hilliard at DePaul in the late 1970s, and percussionist Joe Sonnefeldt to the MJO octet instrumentation.

== Discography ==
- Metropolitan Jazz Octet The Bowie Project, 2023, Origin Records
- Metropolitan Jazz Octet It's Too Hot For Words, 2019, Delmark Records
- Metropolitan Jazz Octet The Road To Your Place, 2018
- Metropolitan Jazz Octet The Bix, 1959, Argo Records
