= Watch Your Step (Bobby Parker song) =

Single by Bobby Parker
- B-side: "Steal Your Heart Away"
- Released: July 1961
- Recorded: 1961
- Studio: Edgewood Studio, Washington D.C.
- Genre: Rhythm and blues
- Length: 2:44
- Label: V-Tone
- Songwriter: Robert Lee Parker

Bobby Parker singles chronology
"Foolish Love" (1959)	"Watch Your Step" (1961)	"It's Too Late Darling" (1963)

"Watch Your Step" is a song by American musician Bobby Parker, released in 1961. The song spent several weeks on the US Billboard Hot 100 chart, peaking at number 51 during the week of July 15, 1961. The song is Parker's signature.

== Original release ==
The song was written by Parker, inspired by Dizzy Gillespie's "Manteca" and Ray Charles' "What'd I Say". Parker said "I started playing [Gillespie's] riff on my guitar and decided to make a blues out of it." It was recorded at the Edgewood Recording Studio in Washington DC in 1961, with Thomas "TNT" Tribble on drums. The record was released on the V-Tone record label, a small enterprise that had been started in Philadelphia, Pennsylvania by Venton "Buddy" Caldwell.

== Influence ==
The single was released in the UK, and had influence far beyond its modest commercial success. It was covered by various artists including Adam Faith, Manfred Mann, the Spencer Davis Group and Carlos Santana. In particular, its main riff served as the inspiration for several songs by the Beatles, most notably "I Feel Fine" and "Day Tripper". In The Beatles Anthology, John Lennon says, "'Watch Your Step' is one of my favourite records. The Beatles have used the lick in various forms. The Allman Brothers used the lick straight as it was." The Allman Brothers song he refers to is "One Way Out", originally written and recorded by Elmore James.

Led Zeppelin also used the riff as the basis for their instrumental, "Moby Dick". Others, including the Yardbirds ("I’m Not Talking", 1965), Deep Purple ("Rat Bat Blue", 1973), Gamma Ray ("New World Order", 2001), and Mahjongg ("Tell the Police the Truth", 2008) were inspired by the riff.
