= Guaguancó =

Subgenre of Cuban rumba

Guaguancó (Spanish pronunciation: [ɡwaɣwaŋˈko]) is a subgenre of Cuban rumba, combining percussion, voices, and dance. There are two main styles: Havana and Matanzas.

== Percussion ==
- battery of three conga drummers: the tumbao "salidor" (lowest), tres dos (middle, playing a counter-clave), and quinto (highest, and lead drum). These parts may also be played on cajones, wooden boxes.
- claves usually played by a singer
- guagua (a.k.a. catá) (hollowed piece of bamboo)
- maraca and/or a chekeré playing the main beats

Other instruments may be used on occasion, for example spoons, palitos (wooden sticks striking the side of the drum), and tables and walls played like drums.

=== Clave ===
Rumba clave in duple-pulse and triple-pulse structures

Rumba clave is the key pattern (guide pattern) used in guaguancó. There is some debate as to how the 4/4 rumba clave should be notated for guaguancó. In actual practice, the third and fourth stroke often fall in rhythmic positions that do not fit neatly into music notation. Triple-pulse strokes can be substituted for duple-pulse strokes. Also, the clave strokes are sometimes displaced in such a way that they don't fall within either a triple-pulse or duple-pulse "grid". Therefore, many variations are possible.

=== Guagua ===
The guagua pattern (also known as palitos, or cáscara) contains all of the strokes of clave.

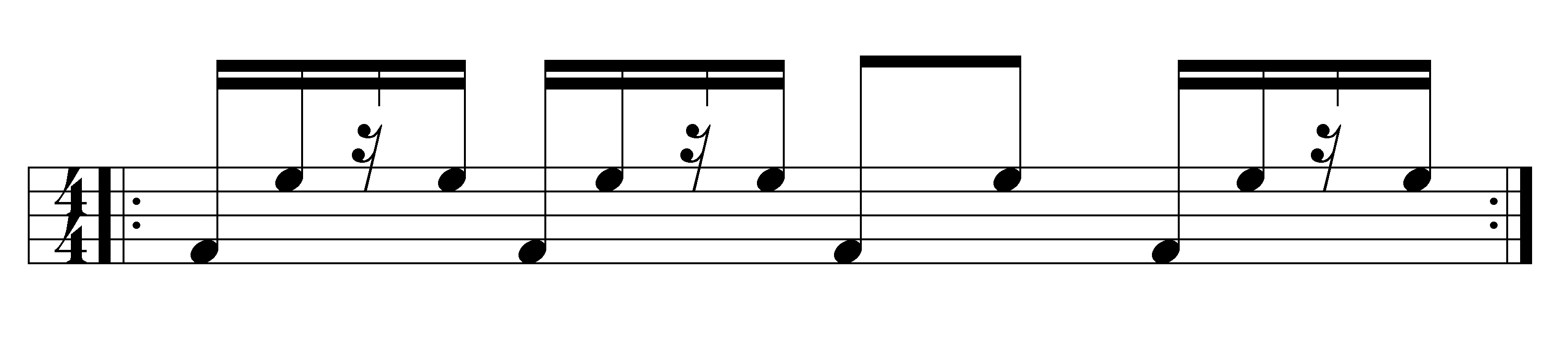
Matanzas-style guaguancó guagua pattern

=== Quinto ===
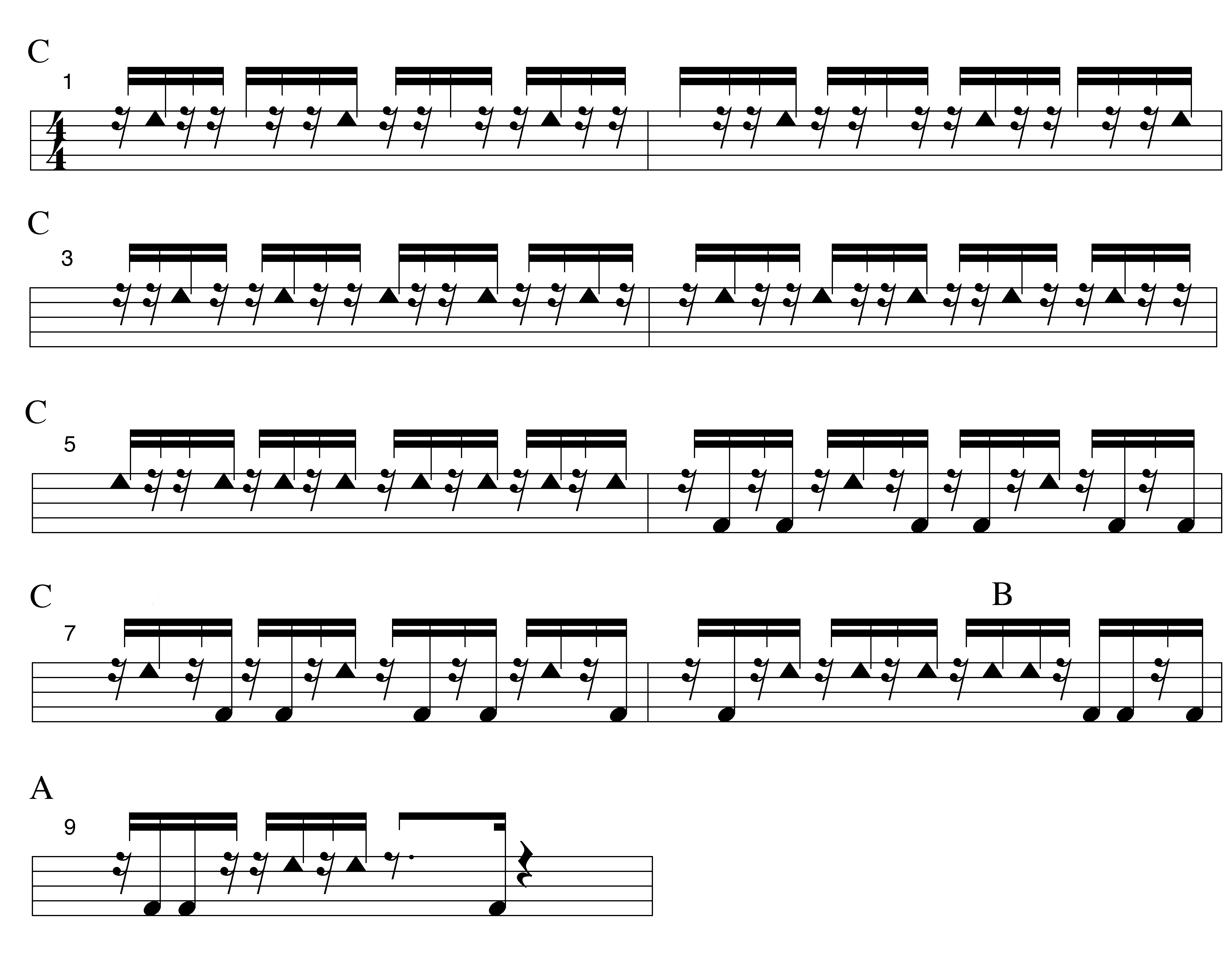
All modes of quinto in context. Quinto excerpt from "La polémica" by Los Muñequitos de Matanzas (1988).

The following nine-measure excerpt is from the guaguancó "La polémica" by Los Muñequitos de Matanzas (1988). This passage moves between the main modes of playing (A, B, C). The A section is the basic lock or ride, as it is known in North America. It spans one clave (measure). An alternate phrase (B) is also one measure in length. Cross-beats, the basis of the third section (C), contradict the meter. By alternating between the lock and the cross, the quinto creates larger rhythmic phrases that expand and contract over several clave cycles. The great Los Muñequintos quintero Jesús Alfonso (1949–2009) described this phenomenon as a man getting "drunk at a party, going outside for a while, and then coming back inside."

== Song ==
The term guaguancó originally referred to a narrative song style (coros de guaguancó) which emerged from the coros de claves of the late nineteenth and early twentieth centuries. Rogelio Martínez Furé states: "[The] old folks contend that strictly speaking, the guaguancó is the narrative." The guaguancó song often begins with the soloist singing meaningless syllables, which is called the diana. According to Larry Crook, the diana is important because it "... also contains the first choral refrain. The lead singer provides a phrase or motive for the choral sections, or they may present new, but related material. Parallel harmonies are usually built above or below a melodic line, with thirds, sixths, and octaves most common." Therefore, the singer who is presented with singing the diana initiates the beginning of the guaguancó. He then may proceed to improvise lyrics stating the reason for holding the present rumba ('decimar'; span.: to make ten-line stanzas), During the verses of the song the quinto is capable of sublime creativity, while musically subordinate to the lead vocalist. There are natural pauses in the cadence of the verses, typically one or two measures in length, where the quinto can play succinct phrases in the "holes" left by the singer. Once the chorus (or montuno section) of the song begins, the phrases of the quinto interact with the dancers more than the lead singer.

== Dance ==
Guaguancó is an Afro Cuban couple dance of sexual competition between the male and female. The male periodically attempts to "catch" his partner with a single thrust of his pelvis. This erotic movement is called the vacunao (‘vaccination’ or more specifically ‘injection’), a gesture derived from yuka and makuta [dances], symbolizing sexual penetration. The vacunao can also be expressed with a sudden gesture made by the hand or foot. The quinto often accents the vacunao, usually as the resolution to a phrase spanning more than one cycle of clave. Holding onto the ends of her skirt while seductively moving her upper and lower body in contrary motion, the female "opens" and "closes" her skirt in rhythmic cadence with the music. The male attempts to distract the female with fancy (often counter-metric) steps, accented by the quinto, until he is in position to "inject" her. The female reacts by quickly turning away, bringing the ends of her skirts together, or covering her groin area with her hand (botao), symbolically blocking the "injection." Most of the time the male dancer does not succeed in "catching" his partner. The dance is performed with good-natured humor—David Peñalosa.

Vernon Boggs states that the woman's "dancing expertise resides in her ability to entice the male while skillfully avoiding being touched by his vacunao." The pattern of quinto strokes and the pattern of the man's dance steps are at times identical, and at other times, imaginatively matched. The quinto player must be able to switch phrases immediately in response to the dancer’s ever-changing steps.

== Selected discography ==
- Songs and Dances (Conjunto Clave y Guaguancó) Xenophile CD 4023 (1990).
- Déjala en la puntica (Conjunto Clave y Guaguancó) Egrem CD0211 (1996).
- Rapsodia rumbera (El Goyo) Egrem CD 0121 (1995).
- Aniversario (Tata Güines) Egrem CD 0156 (1996).
- Guaguancó, v. 1 (Los Muñequitos [Grupo Guaguancó Matancero], Papin) Antilla CD 565 (1956, 1958).
- Guaguancó, v. 2 (Los Muñequitos [Grupo Guaguancó Matancero], Papin) Antilla CD 595 (1958).
- Rumba caliente (Los Muñequitos) Qbadisc CD 9005 (1977, 1988).
- Vacunao (Los Muñequitos) Qbadisc CD 9017 (1995).
- Ito iban echu (Los Muñequitos) Qbadisc CD 9022 (1996).
- Rumberos de corazón (Los Muñequitos) Pimienta CD 566-2 (2003).
- Tambor de fuego (Los Muñequitos) BIS CD 296 (2007).
- D’palo pa rumba (Los Muñequitos) BIS CD 745 (2009).
- Oye men listen . . . guaguancó (Los Papines) Bravo CD 105 [n.d.].
- Homenaje a mis colegas (Los Papines) Vitral CD 4105 (1989).
- Tambores cubanos (Los Papines) Bárbaro CD 239 (1995).
- Papines en descarga (Los Papines) Orfeón CD 16181 (2001).
- Siguen OK (Los Papines) Egrem CD (2004).
- El tambor de Cuba (Chano Pozo) Tumbao CD box set 305 (1947).
- Drums and Chants [Changó] (Mongo Santamaría) Vaya CD 56 (1954).
- Afro Roots [Yambú, Mongo] (Mongo Santamaría) Prestige CD 24018-2 (1958, 1959 ).
- Festival in Havana (Ignacio Piñeiro) Milestone CD 9337-2 (1955).
- Patato y Totico (Patato Valdés) Verve CD 5037 (1968).
- Authority (Patato Valdés) LPV CD 103 (1976).
- Ready for Freddy (Patato Valdés) LPV CD 104 (1976).
- Ritmo afro-cubano (Carlos Vidal Bolado) sides 7, 8 SMC 2520 78 rpm phonorecord (ca. 1949).
- El callejón de los rumberos (Yoruba Andabo) PM CD DM203 (1993).
- Guaguancó afro-cubano (Alberto Zayas) Panart 2055 (1955, 1956).
