= Joe Cuba =

American conga drummer (1931–2009)

- Also known as: Sonny, Joe
- Born: Gilberto Miguel Calderón; April 22, 1931; Harlem, New York, U.S.
- Died: February 15, 2009 (aged 77) New York, New York, U.S.
- Genres: Boogaloo, salsa
- Occupations: Musician, bandleader
- Instrument: Conga
- Years active: 1950–2009
- Labels: Tico, Fania

Gilberto Miguel Calderón (April 22, 1931 – February 15, 2009), known professionally as Joe Cuba, was an American conga drummer of Puerto Rican descent who was widely regarded as the "Father of Latin Boogaloo".

== Early years ==
Gilberto Miguel Calderón was born in Harlem, New York, United States. Calderón's parents moved from Puerto Rico to New York City in the late 1920s, and settled in Spanish Harlem, a Latino community located in Manhattan. Calderón was raised in an apartment building, where his father had become the owner of a candy store, located on the ground floor (street level floor). His father had organized a stickball club called the Young Devils. Stickball was the main sport activity of the neighborhood. After Calderón broke a leg he took up playing the conga and continued to practice with the conga between school and his free time. Eventually, he graduated from high school and joined a band.

== Musical career ==
In 1950, when he was 19 years old, he played for Joe Panama and also for a group called La Alfarona X. The group soon disbanded and Calderón enrolled in college to study law. While at college he attended a concert in which Tito Puente performed "Abaniquito". He went up to Puente and introduced himself as a student and fan, and soon they developed what was to become a lifetime friendship. This event motivated Calderón to organize his own band. In 1954, his agent recommended that he change the band's name from the José Calderón Sextet to the Joe Cuba Sextet, and the newly named Joe Cuba Sextet made their debut at the Stardust Ballroom.

In 1962, after recording three albums for Mardi-Gras Records, Cuba recorded his first album with the Sextet called Steppin' Out including the hit "To Be With You", featuring the vocals of Cheo Feliciano and Jimmy Sabater The band became popular in the New York Latin community. The lyrics to Cuba's music used a mixture of Spanish and English, becoming an important part of the Nuyorican Movement.

In 1965, the Sextet got their first crossover hit with the Latin and soul music fusion of "El Pito (I'll Never Go Back to Georgia)". The "I'll Never Go Back to Georgia" chant was taken from Dizzy Gillespie's intro to the seminal Afro-Cuban tune "Manteca." Sabater later revealed that "None of us had ever been to Georgia."

Along with fellow Nuyorican artists such as Ray Barretto and Richie Ray, Cuba was at the forefront of the developing Latin soul sound in New York, merging American R&B styles with Afro-Cuban instrumentation. Cuba was one of the key architects behind the emerging Latin boogaloo sound, which became a popular and influential Latin style in the latter half of the 1960s. In 1966, his band scored a hit on the United States Billboard Hot 100 with the song "Bang! Bang!". The record peaked at No. 63 on the Hot 100, and No. 21 on the R&B chart. The follow-up, "Oh Yeah", peaked at No. 62 on the Hot 100.

== Later years and death ==
In April 1999, Joe Cuba was inducted into the International Latin Music Hall of Fame. In 2004, he was named Grand Marshal of the Puerto Rican Day Parade celebrated in Yonkers, New York. He was also the director of the Museum of La Salsa, located in Spanish Harlem, Manhattan, New York.

Joe Cuba died on February 15, 2009, in New York City, after being removed from life support. He had been hospitalized for a persistent bacterial infection. Cuba's remains were cremated at Woodhaven Cemetery. He is survived by his two adult children (Mitchell & Lisa) from his first wife (Nina, married in 1960)

== Discography ==
=== As leader ===
- Out of This World Cha Cha with Sonny Rossi (Mardi-Gras LP-5013, 1956)
- Mardi Gras Music For Dancing, Vol. 7 (Mardi-Gras LP-5013, 1959) reissue
- I Tried To Dance All Night (Mardi-Gras LP-5017, 1958)
- Mardi Gras Music For Dancing, Vol. 1 (Mardi-Gras LP-5017, 1959) reissue
- Cha-Cha-Cha's To Soothe The Savage Beast (Mardi-Gras LP-5021, 1959)
- Mardi Gras Music For Dancing, Vol. 2 (Mardi-Gras LP-5021, 1959) reissue
- Red, Hot and Cha Cha Cha (Mardi-Gras LP-5023, 1959)
- Mardi Gras Music For Dancing, Vol. 3 (Mardi-Gras LP-5023, 1959) reissue
- Pachanga Brava! (Discos Fuentes 337028, 1959)
- Merengue Loco with Sonny Rossi (Discos Embajador ES-6002, 1961)
- Joe Cuba (Discos Embajador ES-6003, 1961)
- Steppin' Out (Seeco LP-9248, 1963)
- Diggin' The Most (Seeco LP-9259, 1963)
- Comin' At You (Seeco LP-9268, 1964)
- Vagabundeando! (Hangin' Out) (Tico LP-1112, 1964)
- El Alma del Barrio (The Soul of Spanish Harlem) (Tico LP-1119,1964)
- Bailadores (Tico LP-1124, 1965)
- Estamos Haciendo Algo Bien! (We Must Be Doing Something Right!) (Tico LP-1133, 1966; CD reissue: Fania/Código Music 463 950 9001, 2010) (No. 119 US)
- Wanted Dead or Alive (Bang! Bang! Push, Push, Push) (Tico LP-1146, 1966; CD reissue: Fania/Código Music 463 950 9010, 2010) (No. 131 US)
- Presents 'The Velvet Voice of Jimmy Sabater' (Tico LP-1152, 1967)
- Breakin' Out (Seeco LP-9292, 1967)
- My Man Speedy! (Tico LP-1161, 1968)
- Recuerdos de mi Querido Barrio (Memories of My Beloved Neighborhood) (Tico LP-1226, 1970)
- Bustin' Out (Tico LP-1300, 1972; CD reissue: Vampi Soul [Spain] 019, 2002)
- Hecho y Derecho (Doin' It Right) (Tico LP-1312, 1973)
- Cocinando la Salsa (Cookin' The Sauce) (Tico LP-1405, 1976)
- El Pirata del Caribe (The Caribbean Pirate) (Tico LP-1434, 1979)
- Steppin' Out... Again! (Tiffany TCT-0069, 1995)

=== Compilations ===
- The Best of Joe Cuba (Lo Mejor de Joe Cuba) (Tico LP-1197, 1969)
- Salsa y Bembé (Charly CDHOT-606, 1996)
- The Best of Joe Cuba Sextet (Charly SNAD-528CD, 2001) 2-CD
- Greatest Hits (Fania/Código Music 463 950 8002, 2010)
- El Alcalde del Barrio (Fania/Código Music 463 950 7000, 2010) 2-CD
- Anthology (Fania/Código Music 463 950 7141, 2012) reissue of El Alcalde del Barrio

== See also ==
- Jimmy Sabater
- Boogaloo
