= Jimmy Sabater =

American Latin music singer

- Born: Jaime Sabater; April 11, 1936; New York City, New York
- Died: February 8, 2012 (aged 75)
- Genres: Boogaloo, salsa
- Occupations: Musician, composer, arranger
- Instruments: Timbales, vocals
- Labels: Tico, Fania

Jimmy Sabater (April 11, 1936 – February 8, 2012) was an American musician of Puerto Rican ancestry. A three-time winner of the ACE Awards, he was a singer and timbales player. He gained international fame thanks to his work with the Joe Cuba Sextet in the 1960s and '70s, and later became the lead singer of various groups including Charlie Palmieri's Combo Gigante. His son, Jimmy Sabater Jr., is a trumpeter and bandleader.

== Life and career ==
=== Early life ===
Sabater was the son of Néstor Sabater and Teresa González of Ponce, Puerto Rico. Born Jaime Sabater in Harlem Hospital, New York City, he grew up in East Harlem, the Spanish Quarter of New York City known as "El Barrio". Like most teenagers in the neighborhood, he played stickball, flew kites, and harmonized the tunes of the popular R&B groups and vocalists of the day such as Nat King Cole.

He was inspired by percussionists such as Willie Bobo, Uba Nieto, Papi Pagani, Monchito Muñoz, and Willie Rodríguez. With encouragement from many of these same drummers who were from "El Barrio", Sabater practiced playing the timbales, the standing drum kit made famous by the "Rey del Timbal", Tito Puente. It was during a 1951 stickball game between the Devils and the 112th Street Viceroys that Sabater's life would make a historic turn. A young man named Gilberto Calderón of the Devils met Sabater and invited him to a party. The two became fast friends. They had a lot in common. Both wanted to be musicians after being influenced by the music of Machito, Marcelino Guerra, Noro Morales, Tito Puente and Tito Rodríguez.

=== Joe Cuba Sextet ===
1954 saw the Joe Panama Sextet as one of Spanish Harlem's most popular music groups. When Panama's conguero, or conga drummer, left the group, Sabater recommended his friend Gilberto for the job. Soon after, bandleader Joe Panama fired his sidemen and replaced them with others. The now unemployed musicians, which included vocalist Willie Torres and pianist Nick Jiménez, formed a group which included bassist Roy Rosa, vibraphonist Tommy Berríos, Sabater, and conguero Gilberto Calderón (who had been selected by the musicians to direct the band).

One evening, the group appeared at La Bamba Club in midtown Manhattan under the name of "The Joe Panama Sextet". When Panama's mother threatened to sue Gilberto if he continued using the name, promoter Catalino Rolón recommended that the group change its name to "The Joe Cuba Sextet". They played gigs in the clubs of "El Barrio", as well as upstate New York venues such as The Pines Resort.

The popularity of Cuba's sextet began to rise when José "Cheo" Feliciano joined the group. This occurred when José Curbelo's vocalist Santitos Colón replaced Gilberto Monroig in Tito Puente's band. Willie Torres then left Joe Cuba's Sextet, and replaced Santitos in Curbelo's orchestra. This opened the door for Cheo with Joe Cuba. This worked out perfectly for Cuba. Feliciano was selected to sing songs with Spanish lyrics, while Sabater was selected to sing songs with English lyrics.

From the late 1950s and into the early 1960s the Sextet recorded on the Mardi Gras label, constantly increasing their popularity. In 1962, Seeco Records recorded Joe Cuba's album "Steppin' Out". This album would become a "monster hit", and Sabater would become part of history, as on the album he sang "To Be With You", by Willie Torres, and also wrote and sang the song "Salsa y Bembe", which may be the first known reference to "Salsa" as a music genre. Nick Jimenez composed the melody, but Cuba's decision to have Sabater sing the lyrics thrust him into almost immediate international recognition.

Cuba's sextet signed with Tico Records in 1964. By showcasing the smooth vocal style of Sabater, the group had achieved tremendous fame, both in the United States and around the world. In 1966, they recorded two albums, We Must Be Doing Something Right, and Wanted Dead or Alive. …Something Right scored big because of the hit composition "El Pito (I'll Never Go Back to Georgia)". Wanted… was a landmark recording because it was the first "boogaloo" style album to sell one million records. This happened largely because of another smash composition of Sabater and Jiménez called "Bang Bang". Throughout the 1970s and 1980s, Sabater also had a flourishing career as a soloist, releasing the albums The Velvet Voice of Jimmy Sabater, El Hijo de Teresa, and Solo.

=== New projects and solo work ===
In 1977, Sabater left the Joe Cuba Sextet. From 1977 to 1981, he was the lead vocalist for Al Levy. In 1980 Sabater recorded Gusto on the Fania Records label. In 1982, he co-led "El Combo Gigante" with Charlie Palmieri until the latter's death in 1988. On November 12, 1997, Sabater became the recipient of an award from the City of New York for his contributions to the quality of life in the city, and in appreciation of his work since 1956. He was also the recipient of the "Outstanding Musician of the Year" award from the Comptroller of the City of New York, Alan G. Hevesi.

In 1998, Sabater became the lead vocalist of the Latin Septet "Son Boricua", led by Maestro José Mangual Jr. Their first album, called Son Boricua, was the winner of the ACE Award as best new Latin release of that year. A second, and recently, a third ACE Award were awarded for the albums Homenaje a Cortijo y Rivera and Mo!. Later albums were Clasicos 60s, released in 2002, and Fabulosos 70s, released in 2004, which included renewals of salsa classics songs, originally by José Mangual Jr., Eddie Palmieri and others. Actually, in 2002 Sabater recorded two versions of the classics "Mama Guela" – one with his band Son Boricua, and one as a guest singer with Spanish Harlem Orchestra.

=== Death ===
Sabater died in February 2012, aged 75. The cause was complications of heart disease, according to his son, Jimmy Sabater Jr.

== Discography ==
- The Velvet Voice of Jimmy Sabater (Tico, 1967), with Joe Cuba
- Solo (Tico, 1969), with Ray Barretto
- El Hijo de Teresa (Teresa's Son) (Tico, 1970)
- Mano a Mano Melódico (Tico, 1971), with Bobby Cruz
- To Be With You (Mucho Love & Lotsa Boogie) (Salsa Records, 1976)
- Gusto (Fania Records, 1980)
- Mo! (Cobo, 2001) with José Mangual Jr.
