= Latin Percussion =

Brand of percussion instruments

- Type: Subsidiary
- Founded: 1964; 62 years ago, New York, New York
- Founder: Martin Cohen
- Headquarters: Garfield, New Jersey, U.S
- Area served: Worldwide
- Products: Percussion instruments
- Parent: Drum Workshop
- Website: lpmusic.com

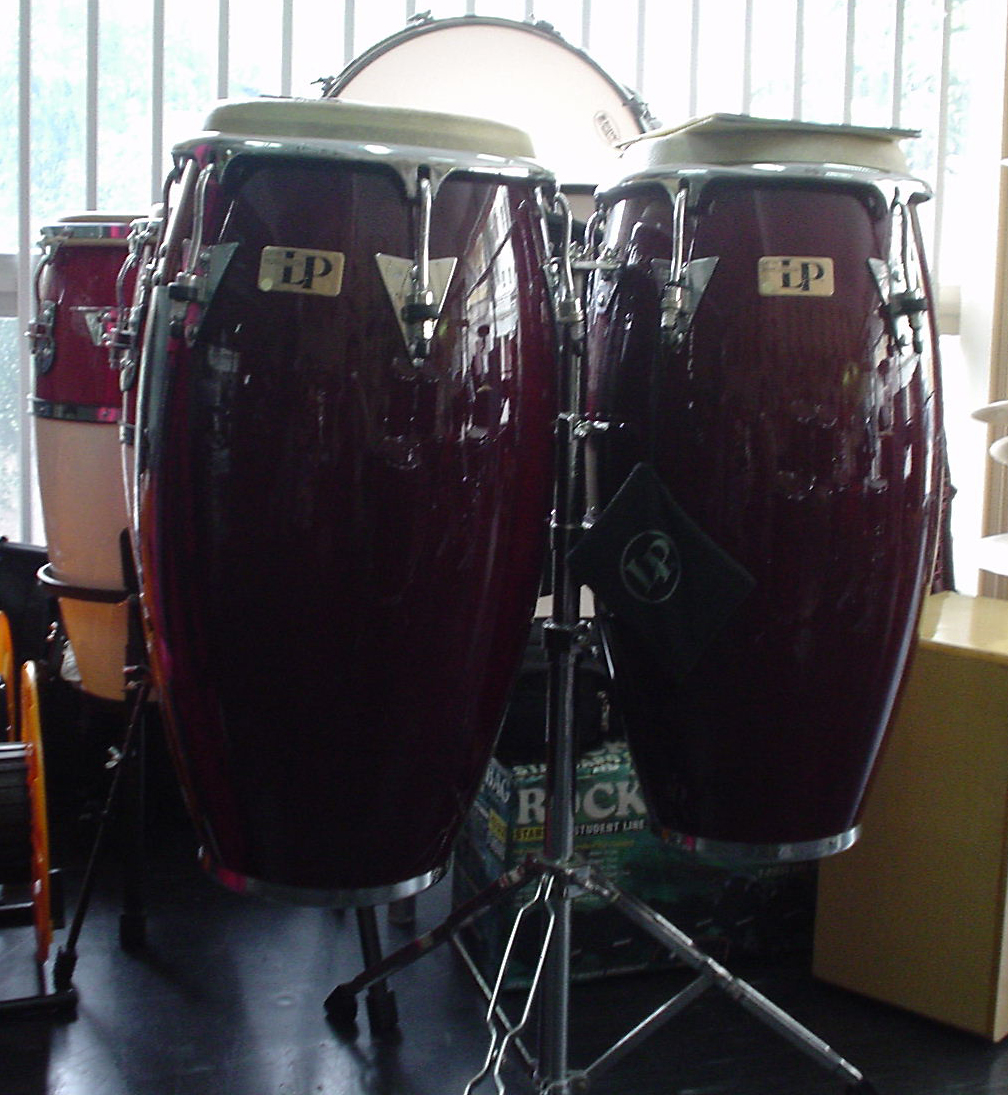
A pair of Latin Percussion conga drums

Latin Percussion, also known as LP, is a brand of percussion instruments, specializing in ethnic instruments and Latin percussion.

== History ==
LP was founded in New York City in 1964 by Martin Cohen. As the company expanded, they added imported lines to their catalog, and also became an exporter.

LP invented several instruments that have become commonplace such as the vibraslap, the jam block, and granite blocks.

== Company information ==
In 2002, LP was purchased by Kaman Music Corporation and operated as its independent subsidiary within Kaman's music distribution segment.

Fender Musical Instruments Corporation purchased LP in 2008. In 2014, LP was purchased by Drum Workshop.

=== Awards ===
In 2001, Martin Cohen received a Special Recognition Award from the International Latin Music Hall of Fame for his contributions during nearly 40 years in the music industry.
