= List of number-one Billboard Top Latin Albums of 2007 =

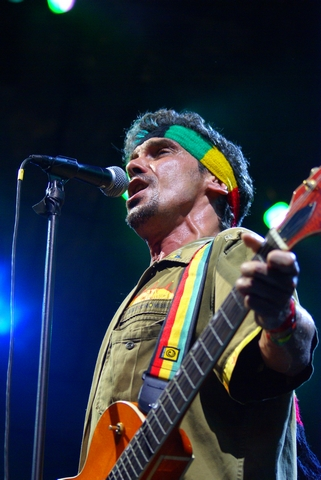
In 2007, Manu Chao peaked at number one for the first time on this chart.

The Billboard Top Latin albums chart, published in Billboard magazine, is a record chart that features Latin music sales information. This data are compiled by Nielsen SoundScan from a sample that includes music stores, music departments at electronics and department stores, internet sales (both physical and digital) and verifiable sales from concert venues in the United States.

There were twenty-two number-one albums in 2007, including two releases by Mexican band RBD: Celestial and Empezar Desde Cero. Celestial, the last number-one album of 2006, spent five weeks at number one and sold 498,000 units; this album became the best-selling Latin album of 2007. Empezar Desde Cero debuted at the top of the chart and sold 102,000 units. Vencedor, the last recording by Mexican performer Valentín Elizalde, who was killed at the age of 27 on November 25, 2006, in the city of Reynosa, Tamaulipas, spent three non-consecutive weeks at the top of the chart. La Llave de Mi Corazón by Dominican singer-songwriter Juan Luis Guerra spent one week at number one and won five Latin Grammy Awards, including Album of the Year and the Grammy Award for Best Tropical Latin Album. The greatest hits collection Historia de un Idolo by Vicente Fernández became the first album to peak at number one in 2001 and 2007.

The first Spanish-language release by Jennifer Lopez, Como Ama una Mujer, debuted at number 10 in the Billboard 200 and also peaked at number one on the chart for four consecutive weeks. La Radiolina by Manu Chao debuted within the Top 10 in the album charts from Austria, Belgium, France, Italy, México, The Netherlands, Norway, Spain, Sweden and Switzerland; it also spent one week at number one in the chart during the week of September 22, 2007. The soundtrack for the movie El Cantante, mainly performed by Marc Anthony, was the second soundtrack to peak at number one, ten years after the compilation album for the movie Dance with Me did so in 1997 (see: Top Latin Albums of 1997). Reggaeton performer Daddy Yankee had his first top 10 album on the Billboard 200, as El Cartel: The Big Boss debuted at number nine with 82,000 units sold, enough to be the number-one album on the chart during the week of June 23, 2007.

== Albums ==
| Chart date | Album | Artist | Reference |
|---|---|---|---|
| January 6 | Celestial | RBD | |
| January 13 | Celestial | RBD | |
| January 20 | Celestial | RBD | |
| January 27 | Celestial | RBD | |
| February 3 | Celestial | RBD | |
| February 10 | Vencedor (Victorious) | Valentín Elizalde | |
| February 17 | Recio, Recio Mis Creadorez (Hurry, Hurry My Creatorz) | Los Creadorez del Pasito Duranguense de Alfredo Ramírez | |
| February 24 | Recio, Recio Mis Creadorez (Hurry, Hurry My Creatorz) | Los Creadorez del Pasito Duranguense de Alfredo Ramírez | |
| March 3 | Vencedor | Valentín Elizalde | |
| March 10 | Vencedor | Valentín Elizalde | |
| March 17 | La Historia Continúa... Parte III (The History Continues, Volume III) | Marco Antonio Solís | |
| March 24 | La Historia Continúa... Parte III (The History Continues, Volume III) | Marco Antonio Solís | |
| March 31 | La Historia Continúa... Parte III (The History Continues, Volume III) | Marco Antonio Solís | |
| April 7 | La Llave de Mi Corazón (The Key to My Heart) | Juan Luis Guerra | |
| April 14 | Como Ama una Mujer (How a Woman Loves) | Jennifer Lopez | |
| April 21 | Como Ama una Mujer (How a Woman Loves) | Jennifer Lopez | |
| April 28 | Como Ama una Mujer (How a Woman Loves) | Jennifer Lopez | |
| May 5 | Como Ama una Mujer (How a Woman Loves) | Jennifer Lopez | |
| May 12 | Residente o Visitante (Resident or Visitor) | Calle 13 | |
| May 19 | Historia de un Idolo, Vol. 1 (History of an Idol) | Vicente Fernández | |
| May 26 | Historia de un Idolo, Vol. 1 (History of an Idol) | Vicente Fernández | |
| June 2 | Mas Flow: Los Benjamins (More Flow: The Benjamins) | Luny Tunes & Tainy | |
| June 9 | Ahora y Siempre (Now and Forever) | Alacranes Musical | |
| June 16 | Ahora y Siempre (Now and Forever) | Alacranes Musical | |
| June 23 | El Cartel: The Big Boss | Daddy Yankee | |
| June 30 | El Cartel: The Big Boss | Daddy Yankee | |
| July 7 | El Cartel: The Big Boss | Daddy Yankee | |
| July 14 | El Cartel: The Big Boss | Daddy Yankee | |
| July 21 | Agárrese (Hang On) | Grupo Montéz de Durango | |
| July 28 | Agárrese (Hang On) | Grupo Montéz de Durango | |
| August 4 | Agárrese (Hang On) | Grupo Montéz de Durango | |
| August 11 | El Cantante - Soundtrack | Marc Anthony | |
| August 18 | El Cantante - Soundtrack | Marc Anthony | |
| August 25 | El Cantante - Soundtrack | Marc Anthony | |
| September 1 | El Cantante - Soundtrack | Marc Anthony | |
| September 8 | El Cantante - Soundtrack | Marc Anthony | |
| September 15 | El Cantante - Soundtrack | Marc Anthony | |
| September 22 | La Radiolina (The Small Radio) | Manu Chao | |
| September 29 | Todo Cambió (Everything Changed) | Camila | |
| October 6 | 90 Millas (90 Miles) | Gloria Estefan | |
| October 13 | 90 Millas (90 Miles) | Gloria Estefan | |
| October 20 | Recuerdos del Alma (Memories of the Soul) | Los Temerarios | |
| October 27 | 90 Millas | Gloria Estefan | |
| November 3 | Recuerdos del Alma | Los Temerarios | |
| November 10 | La Vida... Es Un Ratico (Life... Is a Moment) | Juanes | |
| November 17 | La Vida... Es Un Ratico (Life... Is a Moment) | Juanes | |
| November 24 | Wisin vs. Yandel: Los Extraterrestres (Wisin vs. Yandel: The Extraterrestrials) | Wisin & Yandel | |
| December 1 | Wisin vs. Yandel: Los Extraterrestres (Wisin vs. Yandel: The Extraterrestrials) | Wisin & Yandel | |
| December 8 | Empezar Desde Cero (Starting from Zero) | RBD | |
| December 15 | Wisin vs. Yandel: Los Extraterrestres | Wisin & Yandel | |
| December 22 | Capaz de Todo Por Tí (Capable of Doing Anything for You) | K-Paz de la Sierra | |
| December 29 | Real | Ednita Nazario | |
