= El Cantante (Marc Anthony album) =

2007 soundtrack album by Marc Anthony

Soundtrack album by Marc Anthony
- Released: July 24, 2007
- Recorded: December 2006 – April 2007
- Studio: Alfa Recording Studios (San Juan, Puerto Rico); Jox Studios (Bogotá, Colombia); Eareye Media Group Studios ((Miami, FL); Clinton Recording Studio; Legancy Recording Studios; Sony Recording Studios (New York City, NY)
- Length: 46:53
- Language: Spanish
- Label: Sony BMG Norte
- Producer: Sergio George; Julio Reyes Copello; Birgram Zayas; Marc Anthony

Marc Anthony chronology
Sigo Siendo Yo: Grandes Éxitos (2006)	El Cantante (2007)	Iconos (2010)

Singles from El Cantante
- 1. "Mi Gente" Released: May 28, 2007; 2. "Aguanilé" Released: October 15, 2007; 3. "El Día de Mi Suerte" Released: January 7, 2008; 4. "Escándalo" Released: July 7, 2008

El Cantante (English: The Singer) is the soundtrack album to the film of the same name, the seventh Spanish-language album and ninth studio album by Puerto Rican–American singer-songwriter Marc Anthony. Sony BMG Norte released it on July 24, 2007 (see 2007 in music).

== Background ==
Marc Anthony plays the role of Héctor Lavoe in El Cantante, a film he had been wanting and waiting to make for many years. Lavoe was known, and is still considered a hero to salsa fans, famed for the artistry of his vocals and the intensity of his rhythm, as well as his involvement with famous salsa musician Willie Colón during the early '70s were high points for salsa, and they paved the way for many vocalists to come (including one Marc Anthony). The album is not only a soundtrack, but a tribute album to the famous salsa singer. Anthony's cover versions of "Aguanile", "Che Che Colé", "Mi Gente" and "El Cantante", have become chart topping hits on the United States Latin Billboard. Anthony also worked with Rubén Blades during the production of the film, as well as the soundtrack. The tenth track finds Jennifer Lopez, Anthony's wife in the film, performing a pop ballad titled "Toma de Mí," composed by Canadian singer-songwriter Nelly Furtado. The album was awarded Best Salsa Album at the Latin Grammy Awards of 2008 and Tropical Album of the Year at the 2008 Latin Billboard Music Awards.

== Commercial performance ==
The soundtrack debuted at number 1 on the Billboard Top Latin Albums chart and number 31 on the Billboard 200. In its second week it still peaked at number 1 on the Top Latin Albums but felt back 2 places to end at number 33 on the Billboard 200. It still peaked the Top Latin Albums in the third, fourth and fifth week and went on number 32, number 44 and number 55 on the Billboard 200.

== Track listing ==
1. "El Cantante" (Rubén Blades) – 6:47
2. "Mi Gente" (Johnny Pacheco) – 3:52
3. "Escándalo" (Rafael Cárdenas Crespo; Rubén Fuentes) – 3:58
4. "Aguanilé" (Willie Colón; Héctor Lavoe) – 5:15
5. "Che Che Colé" (Willie Colón) – 3:26
6. "El Día de Mi Suerte" (Willie Colón; Héctor Lavoe) – 5:19
7. "Qué Lío" (Willie Colón; Joe Cuba; Héctor Lavoe) – 4:24
8. "Quítate Tú" (Johnny Pacheco; Bobby Valentín) – 4:24
9. "Todo Tiene Su Final" (Willie Colón) – 4:56
10. "Toma de Mí" (Performed by Jennifer Lopez) (Nelly Furtado; Julio Reyes Copello) — 4:2

== Credits and personnel ==
=== Performers ===
- Yomo Toro – Cuatro
- Milton Cardona – Vocals, coro
- Tito Allen – Vocals, Coro
- Bobby Allende – Congas
- Reynaldo Jorge – Trombone
- Myung Hi Kim – Violin
- Ozzie Melendez – Trombone
- Suzanne Ornstein – Violin
- Ricardo Tiki Pasillas – Percussion
- Marc Quiñones – Timbales
- Laura Seaton – Violin
- Gene Moye – Cello
- Sergio George – Piano
- Ray Colon – Bongos, bells
- Raul Agraz – Trumpet
- Luis Quintero – Percussion, timbales
- William Castro – Arpa
- William Duval – Vocals
- Sarah Seiver – Cello
- José Tabares – Bass
- Peter Winograd – Violin
- Ramon B. Sanchez – Conductor
- Robert Rinehart – Viola
- Daniel Panner – Viola
- Elizabeth Dyson – Cello
- Jenny Strenger – Violin
- Wilson Cifuentes – Flute, gaita
- Katherine Fong – Violin
- Duoming Ba – Violin
- Minyoung Chang – Violin
- Sarah OBoyle – Violin
- Wen Qian – Violin
- Sein Ryu – Violin
- Mario Guini – Electric guitar
- Julio Reyes Copello – Piano
- Jose Mangual – Vocals, Coro
- Daniel Caro – Bandola
- Oriol Caro – Tiple
- Angélica Gámez – Violin
- Laura Ospina – Cello
- Urian Sarmiento – Percussion

=== Technical ===
- Marc Anthony – Producer, executive producer
- Sergio George – Producer
- Héctor Ivan Rosa – Engineer
- Jim Caruana – Engineer
- Luisito Quintero – Percussion overdubs
- David Kutch – Mastering
- Vlado Meller – Mastering
- Peter Wade Keusch – Engineer
- Bigram Zayas – Producer
- Alysia Oakley – Assistant music supervisor
- Maria Paula Marulanda – Art direction
- Matt Havron – Assistant Music supervisor
- Julio Reyes Copello – Arranger, programming, producer

== Charts ==
=== Weekly charts ===
Chart (2007)	Peak position
Spanish Albums (Promusicae)	11
Swiss Albums (Schweizer Hitparade)	100
US Billboard 200	31
US Top Latin Albums (Billboard)	1
US Soundtrack Albums (Billboard)	4
US Tropical Albums (Billboard)	1

=== Year-end charts ===
Chart (2007)	Position
US Top Latin Albums (Billboard)	11
US Tropical Albums (Billboard)	2

Chart (2008)	Position
US Top Latin Albums (Billboard)	27
US Tropical Albums (Billboard)	3

== See also ==
- List of number-one Billboard Top Latin Albums of 2007
- List of number-one Billboard Tropical Albums from the 2000s
