= Mi Gente (Héctor Lavoe song) =

Salsa single by Héctor Lavoe and covered by Marc Anthony

Single by Hector Lavoe

from the album La Voz
- A-side: "El Todopoderoso"
- B-side: "Mi Gente"
- Released: 1975
- Genre: Salsa
- Length: 5:27
- Label: Fania Records
- Songwriter: Johnny Pacheco
- Producer: Willie Colón

"Mi Gente" (English: "My People") is a song by Latin salsa musician Héctor Lavoe from the album, La Voz. It is considered by many Latinos to be his signature song. The most popular version of the song was recorded in 1974 in Africa with the Fania All Stars. The song was composed by Johnny Pacheco.

== Live performances ==
The song's legacy was established through notable live performances alongside the Fania All Stars. It was performed for the first time in 1973 at the inauguration of the Coliseo Roberto Clemente in San Juan, Puerto Rico. In September 1974, Lavoe performed the track before an audience of 80,000 at the Zaire '74 music festival in Kinshasa, which served as a promotional event for the "Rumble in the Jungle" heavyweight boxing match.

== Marc Anthony version ==
"Mi Gente"

Single by Marc Anthony

from the album El Cantante
- Released: July 3, 2007
- Recorded: 2006
- Genre: Salsa
- Length: 3:56
- Songwriter: Johnny Pacheco

Marc Anthony singles chronology
| "¿Qué Precio Tiene el Cielo?" (2006) | "Mi Gente" (2007) | "Aguanilé" (2007) |

"Mi Gente" is a cover of Héctor Lavoe's song by Marc Anthony for the movie El Cantante as he plays Lavoe himself. The song was featured on Gloria Estefan's Mexican promo single of "No Llores". The song received a nomination at the 2008 Latin Billboard Music Awards for "Tropical Airplay Song Of The Year".

=== Chart position ===
| Chart (2007) | Peak position |
|---|---|
| Billboard Hot Latin Tracks | 23 |
| Billboard Latin Tropical/Salsa Airplay | 1 |

== Cover versions ==
- Domingo Quiñones covered the song on his tribute album, ¿Quién Mató a Héctor Lavoe?.
- Angel & Khriz covered "Mi Gente" while using Hector Lavoe's recorded voice. It was included as part of the Urban Tribute to Hector Lavoe.
