= List of Billboard Regional Mexican Albums number ones of 2007 =

The Regional Mexican Albums, published in Billboard magazine, is a record chart that features Latin music sales information for regional styles of Mexican music. This data are compiled by Nielsen SoundScan from a sample that includes music stores, music departments at department stores and verifiable sales from concert venues in the United States.

== Albums ==
Issue date	Album	Artist(s)	Reference(s)
January 6	La Reina Canta a México	Ana Gabriel	
January 13	La Reina Canta a México	Ana Gabriel	
January 20	La Reina Canta a México	Ana Gabriel	
January 27	El Papa De Los Pollitos	Los Tucanes de Tijuana	
February 3	El Papa De Los Pollitos	Los Tucanes de Tijuana	
February 10	Vencedor	Valentín Elizalde	
February 17	Recio, Recio Mis Creadorez	Los Creadorez del Pasito Duranguense de Alfredo Ramirez	
February 24	Recio, Recio Mis Creadorez	Los Creadorez del Pasito Duranguense de Alfredo Ramirez	
March 3	Vencedor †	Valentín Elizalde	
March 10	Vencedor †	Valentín Elizalde	
March 17	Lobo Domesticado	Valentín Elizalde	
March 24	La Historia... Lo Mas Chulo, Chulo, Chulo	Los Caminantes	
March 31	La Historia... Lo Mas Chulo, Chulo, Chulo	Los Caminantes	
April 7	Vencedor †	Valentín Elizalde	
April 14	Detalles Y Emociones	Los Tigres del Norte	
April 21	Mi Vida Loca	Jenni Rivera	
April 28	Historia De Un Idolo	Vicente Fernández	
May 5	Historia De Un Idolo	Vicente Fernández	
May 12	Historia De Un Idolo	Vicente Fernández	
May 19	Historia De Un Idolo	Vicente Fernández	
May 26	Historia De Un Idolo	Vicente Fernández	
June 2	Historia De Un Idolo	Vicente Fernández	
June 9	Ahora Y Siempre	Alacranes Musical	
June 16	Ahora Y Siempre	Alacranes Musical	
June 23	Historia De Un Idolo †	Vicente Fernández	
June 30	Historia De Un Idolo †	Vicente Fernández	
July 7	Historia De Un Idolo †	Vicente Fernández	
July 14	Te Va A Gustar	El Chapo de Sinaloa	
July 21	Agárrese!	Grupo Montez de Durango	
July 28	Agárrese!	Grupo Montez de Durango	
August 4	Agárrese!	Grupo Montez de Durango	
August 11	Agárrese!	Grupo Montez de Durango	
August 18	Agárrese!	Grupo Montez de Durango	
August 25	Agárrese!	Grupo Montez de Durango	
September 1	El Regrso De Los Reyes	Martinez Cruz Presenta Los Super Reyes	
September 8	El Regrso De Los Reyes	Martinez Cruz Presenta Los Super Reyes	
September 15	El Indomable	Cristian Castro	
September 22	Herencia Musical: 20 Corridos Prohibidos	Los Tigres del Norte	
September 29	Historia De Un Idolo †	Vicente Fernández	
October 6	Historia De Un Idolo †	Vicente Fernández	
October 13	Para Siempre †	Vicente Fernández	
October 20	Recuerdos del Alma	Los Temerarios	
October 27	Recuerdos del Alma	Los Temerarios	
November 3	Recuerdos del Alma	Los Temerarios	
November 10	Recuerdos del Alma	Los Temerarios	
November 17	Para Siempre †	Vicente Fernández	
November 24	Para Siempre †	Vicente Fernández	
December 1	Para Siempre †	Vicente Fernández	
December 8	Capaz de Todo Por Ti	K-Paz de la Sierra	
December 15	Para Siempre †	Vicente Fernández	
December 22	Capaz De Todo Por Ti †	K-Paz De La Sierra	
December 29	Capaz De Todo Por Ti †	K-Paz De La Sierra	
