= Aguanilé =

Single by Willie Colón and Héctor Lavoe

from the album El Juicio
- Language: Spanish
- Released: 15 May 1972
- Recorded: February – April 1972
- Studio: Broadway Recordings, NY
- Genre: Afro-Caribbean music; salsa
- Length: 6:16
- Label: Fania
- Songwriters: William Anthony Colón; Héctor Pérez
- Producers: Jerry Masucci; Willie Colón

Willie Colón and Héctor Lavoe singles chronology
"Esta Navidad" (1971)	"Aguanilé" (1972)	"La Murga" (1972)

"Aguanilé" (Watered Down) is a salsa song written and performed by trombonist Willie Colón and singer Héctor Lavoe. It was released as the first single from their seventh studio album El Juicio released in 1972. The title comes from the Yoruba culture in Nigeria and means "spiritual cleansing for your house" perhaps referring to Lavoe's struggles with drug addiction that had intensified by this point.

"Aguanilé" references a syncretic religion that originated in Cuba and spread to Puerto Rico, which combined West African religious beliefs and practices with the Catholicism of Spain. Over the course of its involvement in Atlantic slavery, Spain abducted and brought to the Caribbean millions of Africans, many of them from the Yoruba and Benin empires. Enslaved people created their own religious practices and cultures to maintain a sense of communal connection and resist the power of their enslavers. Lavoe and Colón pay homage to the African heritage of Puerto Ricans, even as they bring that history to the wider Spanish-speaking world.

The song begins with an invocation to Yemaya, the goddess of the sea (a reference to Yemaya's healing powers as well as the Middle Passage, in which enslaved Africans were brought across the Atlantic from Africa to the New World). The refrain "Aguanilé mai mai" is a cry to the orishas. The rest of the song calls for healing, both personal and global. The lyrics pray for an end to war and cite the example of Jesus who died on the cross to bring peace to the world.

Musically, "Aguanilé" draws upon the drumming traditions enslaved people brought from Africa. It uses not just western instruments like trombones, trumpet, piano, bass guitar, but leans heavily on a percussion section featuring congas (masterfully played by Milton Cardona), timbales, bongo, cowbell, maracas, and clave, all of which play an important role in traditional Puerto Rican music like bomba and plena. Although all salsa music combines instruments from jazz and Afro-Caribbean musical traditions, "Aguanilé" is unusual in that it makes explicit the centrality of West African religion, culture, and music to the genre.

The song has a small verse that is interpreted by Lavoe in Greek: "Kyrie eleison", which means: "Lord have mercy", belonging to the ordinary of the mass. The song was produced by Colón himself along with Fania Records co-founder Jerry Masucci.

== Background ==
After several gold albums, beginning with Cosa Nuestra in 1970, Colón and Lavoe became the most prominent performers on the salsa scene in both Puerto Rico and New York. As Lavoe's personal and professional lives became increasingly chaotic due to his drug use, he and Colón wrote "Aguanilé" to indirectly reference Lavoe's addiction and desire for healing, as well as both musicians' commitment to the religious and musical traditions of Puerto Rico.

== Music and lyrics ==
"Aguanilé" was written and produced by Colón and Lavoe. The song invokes the Yoruba orishas.

== Marc Anthony version ==
"Aguanilé"

Single by Marc Anthony

from the album El Cantante
- Released: 31 October 2007
- Genre: Salsa
- Length: 5:15
- Label: Sony Norte
- Songwriters: William Anthony Colón; Héctor Pérez
- Producer: Sergio George

Marc Anthony singles chronology
"Mi Gente" (2007)	"Aguanilé" (2007)	"El Día de Mi Suerte" (2008)

American singer-songwriter Marc Anthony recorded a cover version of the song for his soundtrack album El Cantante in 2007. Anthony bought six hundred records to listen and select the songs that would be included on the album, the first of other cover albums that he will be releasing under this concept. Anthony recorded "Mi Gente", "El Día de Mi Suerte" and "Qué Lío", written by Colón, Lavoe and Joe Cuba, since the songs were "related to his taste in music and who he was".

=== Charts ===
Chart (2007)	Peak position
US Hot Latin Songs (Billboard)	31
US Tropical Airplay (Billboard)	2

== See also ==
- 2007 in Latin music
