= Fantasmas (Willie Colón album) =

1981 studio album by Willie Colón

Studio album by Willie Colón
- Released: 1981
- Recorded: New York City
- Genre: Salsa
- Length: 43:40
- Labels: Fania Records JM 590; WAC Production NYC
- Producer: Willie Colón

Willie Colón chronology
Doble Energía (1980)	Fantasmas (1981)	Corazón Guerrero (1982)

Fantasmas (Ghosts) is the second studio album by Willie Colón, released in 1981 by Fania Records. The album was very experimental, introducing sounds and rhythms like Zamba, Plena, Bomba and Disco Music. The album was released in 1981 during the Romantic Salsa period and gave him a musical vehicle to explore his new interests. The album was named one of the 50 greatest salsa albums of all time by Rolling Stone Magazine in October 2024.

== Tracklisting ==
The song list have been adapted from AllMusic.

All tracks are written by Willie Colón, except where noted.

No.	Title	Writer(s)	Length
1.	"Oh, Qué Será?"	Chico Buarque	6:10
2.	"Sueño de Papelote"	Eladia Blázquez	4:14
3.	"Mi Sueño"	Willie Colón, Martinho da Vila	6:36
4.	"Celo"	José Ruiz	4:01
5.	"Amor Verdadero"	Eddy Grant	7:26
6.	"Volar a Puerto Rico"	Willie Colón	5:02
7.	"Al Dormir"	Willie Colón	3:42
8.	"Toma Mis Manos"	Willie Colón	6:03
Total length:			43:40

== Personnel ==
- Willie Colón: Synthesizer, Chorus Ensemble, Top Producer, Mixing, Lead Vocals
- Jon Fausty: Engineer, Mixing
- Jerry Masucci: Executive Producer
- Fabian Ross: Associate Producer
- Leopoldo Pineda: Assistant Producer, Trombone
- Jorge Calandrelli: Piano, Arranger (Al Dormir & Sueño de Papelote)
- Lewis Kahn: Trombone
- Sam Burtis: Trombone
- Yomo Toro: Cuatro
- Salvador Cuevas: Bass
- Paul Kimbarrow: Drums
- Hector Garrido: Vocal Arrangements, Arranger (Amor Verdadero, Oh Que Sera & Mi Sueño)
- Marty Sheller: Arranger (Volar a Puerto Rico & Celo)
- Ruben Blades: Chorus Ensemble
- Jose Torres: Piano
- Jose Mangual: Bongo, Maracas, Guiro, Guira, Chorus Ensemble
- Milton Cardona: Tumba, Quinto, Chequere, Surdo, Claves, Chorus Ensemble
- Johnny Almendra: Timbal
- Harold Kohon: Strings
- Luis Cruz: Arranger (Toma Mis Manos)
- Damaris Cortez: Chorus Ensemble (Toma Mis Manos, Amor Verdadero, Oh Que Sera, Volar A Puerto Rico)
- Doris Eugenio: Chorus Ensemble (Mi Sueño, Toma Mis Manos, Amor Verdadero, Oh Que Sera, Volar A Puerto Rico)
- Yvonne: Chorus Ensemble (Amor Verdadero, Oh Que Sera, Volar A Puerto Rico)
- Encarnacion Perez: Chorus Ensemble (Mi Sueño)
- Sandy Mangual: Chorus Ensemble (Mi Sueño)
- Nancy O'Neil: Chorus Ensemble (Mi Sueño)
- Frank Kolleogy: Photography
- Terry Borges: Art Direction
- Ron Levine: Album Design

Recorded at La Tierra Studios / Mixed at Latin Sound Studios.

== See also ==
- Willie Colón discography
