= Crime Pays =

Crime Pays may refer to:

- Crime Pays (Willie Colón album), 1973
- Crime Pays (Cam'ron album), 2009
- "Crime Pays" (Bear Hands song), 2010
- "Crime Pays", a song by Freddie Gibbs and Madlib off their collaborative album Bandana, 2019

== See also ==
- Crime Does Not Pay (disambiguation)
