= El Baquiné de Angelitos Negros =

1977 studio album by Willie Colón

Studio album by Willie Colón
- Released: 1977
- Genre: Boogaloo; Avant-Garde; Soul music
- Label: Fania Records
- Producer: Willie Colón

Professional ratings
Review scores
Source	Rating
The Encyclopedia of Popular Music	3/5 stars
MusicHound World	3.5/5 stars

El Baquiné de Angelitos Negros is a dark eclectic (in the tradition of' Filles de Kilimanjaro) concept album by Willie Colón. It's the soundtrack for a tv special of the same name produced by Latino Broadcasting Service that aired on New York PBS affiliate WNET.

== Track listing ==
1. "Angustia Maternal" - 4:00
2. "Camino al Barrio" - 3:34
3. "Son Guajira del Encuentro" - 4:00
4. "Angelitos Negros Part I" - 0:59
5. "Cuatro por Tres (El Sueño de Juana)" - 1:11
6. "Acuérdate" - 1:50
7. "Angelitos Negros Part II" - 0:41
8. "Para Los Viejitos" - 7:21
9. "Apartamento 21" - 2:44
10. "8th Avenue (In the Park)" - 2:49
11. "El Baquine" - 2:45
12. "8th Avenue (El Fin)" - 1:21

written, arranged and produced by Willie Colón

== Personnel ==
- Ernie Agosto: bongos
- Sanford Allen: violin
- Andres Eloy Blanco: Spanish vocals
- Milton Cardona: congas, soloist
- Jose Cigno: drums
- Selwart Clarke: cello
- Willie Colón: trombone, arranger, director, producer
- Alfredo de la Fe: violin
- Gene Golden: percussion, congas, soloist
- Andy González: bass
- Rodgers Grant: piano
- Lewis Kahn: trombone
- Kathryn Kienke: violin
- Gloria Lanzarone: cello
- Tom "Bones" Malone: synthesizer
- Jose Mangual Jr.: bongos, soloist
- Eddy Martinez: piano
- Yoko Matsuo: violin
- Kermit Moore: violin
- Alphonse Mouzon: drums
- Thomas Muriel: liner notes
- Raymond Orchart: percussion
- Victor Paz: trumpet, soloist
- Bobby Porcelli: flute, sax (alto), soloist
- Edward Rivera: bass (electric)
- Mario Rivera: sax (baritone)
- Barry Rogers: trombone, soloist
- Louis Romero: timbales, soloist
- Marty Sheller: conductor
- Mauricio Smith: flute, piccolo, soloist
- Yomo Toro: guitar, cuatro
