= Tiempo Pa' Matar =

Studio album by Willie Colón
- Released: 1983
- Studio: La Tierra Sound Studios, A&R Studios (Nueva York)
- Genre: Salsa; latin
- Length: 45:31
- Language: Spanish
- Label: Fania
- Producer: Willie Colón; Milton Cardona

Willie Colón chronology
Corazón Guerrero (1982)	Tiempo Pa' Matar (1983)	Criollo (1984)

Singles from Tiempo Pa' Matar
- 1. "Gitana" Released: May 16, 1984; 2. "Tiempo Pa' Matar" Released: July 8, 1984; 3. "Falta de Consideración" Released: September 28, 1984

Tiempo Pa' Matar (transl. Time To Kill) is the fourth studio album by American singer and trombonist Willie Colón. It was released on May 23, 1983 by Fania Records. The album has 8 tracks and was the most successful album Colón made for Fania Records, surpassing his previous albums Solo and Fantasmas. The lead single "Tiempo Pa' Matar" was a protest song by Colón against the Vietnam War.

== Context ==
Tiempo Pa' Matar moved away from the rhythmic sound of Colón's previous albums Fantasmas and Corazón Guerrero. Stylistically Tiempo Pa' Matar fuses the genres of salsa and plena with a flute sound.

== Track listing ==
Tiempo Pa' Matar track listing
No.	Title	Writer(s)	Producer(s)	Length
1.	"Voló"	Rafael Hernández; Willie Colón	Willie Colón	5:29
2.	"Falta de Consideración"	Bill Seidman; Colón	Colón	5:21
3.	"Gitana"	José Ortega	Colón; Milton Cardona	6:55
4.	"Serenata"	Colón	Colón	4:46
5.	"El Diablo"	Colón	Colón	6:38
6.	"Tiempo Pa' Matar"	Colón	Colón	5:00
7.	"Noche de Los Enmascarados"	Chico Buarque	Colón	4:03
8.	"Callejón Sin Salida"	Colón	Graciela Carriquí; Colón; Cardona	7:26
Total length:				45:31
