= Lo Mato =

Studio album by Willie Colón
- Released: 1973
- Genre: Salsa
- Label: Fania

Willie Colón chronology
Crime Pays (1972)	Lo Mato (1973)	Willie (1974)

Professional ratings
Review scores
Source	Rating
AllMusic	4/5 stars
The Encyclopedia of Popular Music	3/5 stars
MusicHound World	3.5/5 stars

Lo Mato (Si No Compra Este LP) (transl. I'll Kill Him (If You Don't Buy this LP) is the eighth studio album by Willie Colón and Héctor Lavoe, released during 1973 by Fania Records. It was the fourth of Colón and Lavoe's records to go gold, after Cosa Nuestra (1970), La Gran Fuga (1971), and El Juicio (1972).

The cover shows a variant of the National Lampoon, January 1973 cover If you don't buy this magazine, we'll kill this dog. The man being held up on the cover, while reversing the roles with Willie on the floor on the reverse, was José R. Padrón.

In 2022, the album was completely remastered and recut for vinyl from the original master tapes by engineer Kevin Gray, which was released by Craft Latino, the reissue label of Concord Music, the owner of the Fania catalog.

== Track listing ==
1. "Señora Lola"
2. "Todo Tiene Su Final"
3. "La María"
4. "Junio 73"
5. "Calle Luna, Calle Sol"
6. "Voso"
7. "El Día De Suerte"
8. "Guajira Ven"

== Personnel ==
- Trombone, Backing Vocals, Primary Artist - Willie Colón
- Vocals - Héctor Lavoe
- Trombone - Eric Matos
- Piano - Joe Torres
- Bongos - Jose Mangual Jr.
- Timbales - Louis Romero
- Congas - Milton Cardona
- Bass - Santi González
- Backing Vocals - Johnny Pacheco, Justo Betancourt
- Composers - Willie Colón, Héctor Lavoe, C. Alonso Curet, E. "Chino" de Padrón
- Producers - Willie Colón, Jerry Masucci
- Recording Director - Johnny Pacheco
- Engineer - Jon Fausty
- Design - Ron Levine
- Liner Notes - Ernesto Lechner
- Model - José R. Padrón
