= El Juicio =

1972 studio album by Willie Colón

Studio album by Willie Colón
- Released: 1972
- Genres: post-Boogaloo, salsa
- Label: Fania

Willie Colón chronology
| La Gran Fuga (1971) | El Juicio (1972) | Asalto Navideño Vol. 2 (1973) |

El Juicio (The Judgment) is an album by Willie Colón & Héctor Lavoe issued in 1972 by Fania Records. It was the third of Colón and Lavoe's records to go gold, after Cosa Nuestra (1970), La Gran Fuga (1971), and before Lo Mato (1973).

== Track listing ==
1. Ah-Ah/O-No
2. Pirana
3. Seguire Sin Ti
4. Timbalero
5. Aguanile
6. Sonando Despierto
7. Si La Ves
8. Pan Y Agua (Bread & Water)

== Personnel ==
- Design - Aggie Whelan
- Composer - C. Alonso Curet
- Trombone - Eric Matos
- Percussion - Gene Golden
- Composer, Vocals - Héctor Lavoe
- Engineer - Irving Greenbaum
- Art Direction - Izzy Sanabria
- Producer - Jerry Masucci
- Piano - Joe Torres
- Choir/Chorus, Recording Director - Johnny Pacheco
- Bongos - Jose Mangual Jr.
- Composer - Juan José Quiros Rosado
- Choir/Chorus - Justo Betancourt
- Timbales - Louis Romero
- Congas - Milton Cardona
- Composer - Rafaél Angel Ramos
- Bass - Santi González
- Arranger, Composer, Flute, Primary Artist, Producer, Trombone - Willie Colón
