= Asalto Navideño =

Studio album by Willie Colón & Héctor Lavoe
- Released: 1970
- Length: 32:18
- Label: Fania
- Producer: Jerry Masucci

Willie Colón & Héctor Lavoe chronology
Cosa Nuestra (1969)	Asalto Navideño (1970)	La Gran Fuga (1971)

Asalto Navideño (Spanish for "Christmas Assault") is a Christmas album by American musicians Willie Colón and Héctor Lavoe. It was released by Fania Records in 1970.

== Background and release ==
Colón hired Puerto Rican musician Yomo Toro to play cuatro on the album, which gave a boost to his career. John Bush of AllMusic noted that Toro's presence on the album gave it a jíbaro feel, which "any Puerto Rican native or person with heritage would recognize and appreciate during the Christmas season".

Colón and Lavoe released a second Christmas album in 1973, entitled Asalto Navideño Vol. II. The album again featured Toro playing the cuatro, and he also appeared on the cover dressed as Santa Claus. Both albums were later re-released together.

The track "La Murga" was a particular hit, and was later covered by Víctor Piñero with Los Melódicos.

== Critical reception ==
Professional ratings
Review scores
Source	Rating
AllMusic	3/5 stars
AllMusic (reissue with vol. 2)	4/5 stars
The Encyclopedia of Popular Music	3/5 stars
MusicHound World	3.5/5 stars

The album was named one of the 50 greatest salsa albums of all time by Rolling Stone Magazine in October 2024.

== Track listing ==
Side One
No.	Title	Writer(s)	Length
1.	"Introducción"		2:58
2.	"Canto A Borínquen"	Flor Morales Ramos	4:29
3.	"Popurrí Navideño / Estrella De Oriente (De Tierras Lejanas) / Noche De Paz / La Virgen María / La Tierra Mía"	Traditional	3:36
4.	"Traigo La Salsa"	Héctor Lavoe, Willie Colón	3:55
Total length:			15:01

Side Two
No.	Title	Writer(s)	Length
1.	"Aires De Navidad"	Roberto García	3:43
2.	"La Murga"	Lavoe, Colón	5:34
3.	"Esta Navidad"	Lavoe, Colón	5:17
4.	"Vive Tu Vida Contento"	Morales Ramos	2:43
Total length:			17:17

== Personnel ==
- Willie Colón – leader, trombone, chorus vocals
- Héctor Lavoe – lead vocals
- William "Sweet" Campbell – trombone
- Milton Cardona – congas, percussion
- José Mangual Jr. – bongos, percussion
- Johnny Pacheco – percussion, chorus vocals
- Prof. Joe Torres – piano
- Louie "Timbalito" Romero – timbales
- Santi "Choflomo" González – bass
- Yomo Toro – cuatro
- Roberto García – cuatro
- Miguel "El Túnel" Matos – "band boy", minor percussion
- Justo Betancourt – chorus vocals

Technical

- Jerry Masucci – production
- Johnny Pacheco – recording
- Irv Greenbaum – engineering

Artistic

- Elliot Sachs – cover location
- Izzy Sanabria – design
- Len Bauman – photography
