= Crime Does Not Pay =

Crime Does Not Pay may refer to:

- Crime Does Not Pay (comics), a popular American series of comic books published between 1942 and 1955
- Crime Does Not Pay (film and radio series), a short film and anthology radio crime drama series 1935-1952
- "Crime Doesn't Pay", the 103rd episode of the ABC television series Desperate Housewives

== See also ==
- Crime Pays (disambiguation)
