= Corazón Guerrero =

Studio album by Willie Colón
- Released: May 9, 1982 and August, 1982
- Studio: La Tierra Sound Studios
- Genre: Salsa, Latín, Latín pop
- Length: 37:17
- Language: Spanish
- Label: Fania Récords
- Producer: Willie Colón, Leo Pineda, Milton Cardona
- Compiler: Fania Récords

Willie Colón chronology
Fantasmas (1981)	Corazón Guerrero (1982)	Tiempo Pa' Matar (1983)

Corazón Guerrero (Warrior Heart) is the third studio album by Willie Colón, originally released on May 9, 1982, later released in August 1982, by Fania Records. It is often considered the first Latin pop album due to the mix of harmonic rhythms that Colón used in the recordings with the violins and the saxophones. The song that most highlights this is "Casanova" which contains characteristics of modern Latin pop. On this album, Willie Colón does not skimp on excellent musicians, especially on trombone, percussion and voice.

The result is a neo-solo musical extravaganza that truly captures the musical energy of the innovator of the time. One of the best songs on the album is the ballad "El Hijo y el Papá".

== Album synopsis ==
The album was made in full musical creativity of Colón where his single "Corazón Guerrero", which is a Spanish version of the song "Sultans of Swing" by Dire Straits, was fundamental, and "Casanova". There is also the ballad "El Hijo y el Papá" which was dedicated to his son Diego.

== Tracklisting ==
The track listing has been adapted from AllMusic releases of the Corazón Guerrero album.

No.	Title	Writer(s)	Length
1.	"Corazón Guerrero"	Mark Knopfler	7:53
2.	"¿Qué Pasará Mañana?"	Gerald Goffin, Carole King	4:39
3.	"Suéltale el Rabo al Dragón"	Willie Colón	6:02
4.	"Amor Barato"	Francis Hime, Francisco Buarque De Hollanda	5:14
5.	"El Hijo y el Papá"	Jean-Lup Dabadie, Sylvain Krief	4:28
6.	"Casanova"	Sylvian Krief	3:23
7.	"Dormido, No"	Jacques Brel	5:40
Total length:			37:17

== Musicians and Staff ==
Recording Musicians.

- Jack Adelman: Editing
- John Andrews: Drums
- Gabriela Arnon: Choir, Chorus, Vocals (Background)
- Sam Burtis: Trombone (Bass)
- Jorge Calandrelli: Piano
- Milton Cardona: Conga
- Graciela Carriqui: Assistant Producer, Audio Production, Choir, Chorus, Vocals (Background)
- Diego Colón: Children's Voices, Vocals, Vocals (Background)
- Willie Colón: Adaptation, Audio Production, Concept, Director, Musical Direction, Producer, Translation, Trombone, Vocals
- Sal Cuevas: Assistant Producer, Audio Production, Bass, Guitar (Bass)
- Cecilia Engelhart: Vocals (Background)
- Doris Eugenio: Choir, Chorus, Vocals (Background)
- Jon Fausty: Audio Engineer, Engineer, Technical Director
- Blanca Goodfriend: Vocals (Background)
- Louise Hilton: Graphic Design
- Lewis Kahn: Trombone
- Harold Kohon: Strings
- Leo Pineda: Audio Production
- Jose Mangual: Bongos
- Leopoldo Pineda: Assistant Producer, Trombone
- John Purcell: Flute, Saxophone
- Dan Reagan: Trombone
- Deborah Resto: Choir, Chorus, Vocals (Background)
- Elliot Sachs: Art Direction
- Ulf Skogsbergh: Photography
- Mauricio Smith: Flute, Saxophone
- Jose Torres: Piano
- Buddy Williams: Drums
- Kevin Zambrana: Assistant Engineer
- Héctor "Bomberito" Zarzuela: Flugelhorn.
