= Funky Jibaro =

Studio album by Yomo Toro
- Released: 1988
- Label: Antilles/Island
- Producer: Robert Musso

Yomo Toro chronology
Funky Jibaro (1988)	Gracias (1990)

Funky Jibaro is an album by the Puerto Rican musician Yomo Toro. Released in 1988, it was his first widely distributed album.

== Production ==
Funky Jibaro was produced by Robert Musso. Toro used a 10-string cuatro on the album, which he played left-handed and upside down. Daniel Ponce played congas. Funky Jibaro combined elements of salsa, folk, and charanga with Toro's expert cuatro playing.

== Critical reception ==
Professional ratings
Review scores
Source	Rating
AllMusic	3.5/5 stars
Robert Christgau	B+
MusicHound World: The Essential Album Guide	4/5 stars

Robert Christgau deemed the album a "sweet mountain record," contrasting it favorably to then recent "city" and "ethnomusicological" salsa albums. The New York Times noted that, "with his electrified cuatro, which sounds like a mandolin that's been pumping iron, and his speed-demon technique, [Toro] makes the cuatro a lead instrument for salsa and hybrids of other pop styles from all around the Americas."

The Chicago Tribune determined that, "though the few ballads are an acquired taste, the rest of the numbers, nearly all lively, Latin-inflected Toro originals, are a jaw-dropping display of facility, funk and feeling." The Edmonton Journal stated that Funky Jibaro "balances out the flamenco flavor of his remarkable cuatro playing with a spicy mix of percussion and warm melodic backing from the violin."

AllMusic wrote that Toro uses "the cuatro for catchy riffs, for backing the vocalists, for extended solo displays of virtuosity, and for laying out grooves when he isn't busy with other duties on the instrument."

== Track listing ==
No.	Title	Length
1.	"Funky Jibaro"
2.	"El Sapo"
3.	"Cuatro Pachanga"
4.	"Tributo a Los Angelitos Negros"
5.	"Recuerdame"
6.	"Mambo Oriental"
7.	"A la Verde Gue"
8.	"Minerva"
9.	"Raging Toro"
10.	"Cuatro Feeling"
