= Yomo Toro =

Puerto Rican musician (1933–2012)

Background information
- Also known as: Yomo Toro
- Born: Víctor Guillermo Toro; 26 July 1933
- Origin: Guánica, Puerto Rico
- Died: 30 June 2012 (aged 78) Bronx, New York
- Genres: Bomba; aguinaldos; bolero; salsa; Latin pop; acoustic; son; guaguanco; plena
- Occupations: Cuatro player; guitarist; composer; musician; arranger
- Instrument: Cuatro
- Years active: 1951–2012
- Labels: Fania; Island; SEECO

Víctor Guillermo "Yomo" Toro (26 July 1933 – 30 June 2012) was a Puerto Rican left-handed guitarist and cuatro player. Known internationally as "The King of the Cuatro," Toro recorded over 150 albums throughout a 60-year career and worked extensively with Cuban legends Arsenio Rodríguez and Alfonso "El Panameño" Joseph; salsa artists Willie Colón, Héctor Lavoe and Rubén Blades; and artists from other music genres including Frankie Cutlass, Harry Belafonte, Paul Simon, Linda Ronstadt and David Byrne.

== Early years ==
Victor Guillermo Toro was born in Ensenada, within the municipality of Guánica, near the southwestern corner of Puerto Rico. His father, Alberto, drove a truck for the sugarcane mills of the South Porto Rican Sugar Company and played cuatro in a band along with Yomo Toro's uncles.

Nicknamed "Yomo" by his father, Toro began to play music at age 6.

At age 15, Toro formed the string trio La Bandita de la Escuela ("The Little School Band"). He continued his musical career by performing at events with La Bandita and other trios, all over the island of Puerto Rico, as well as on the radio program La Montaña Canta (The Mountain Sings).

== The cuatro ==
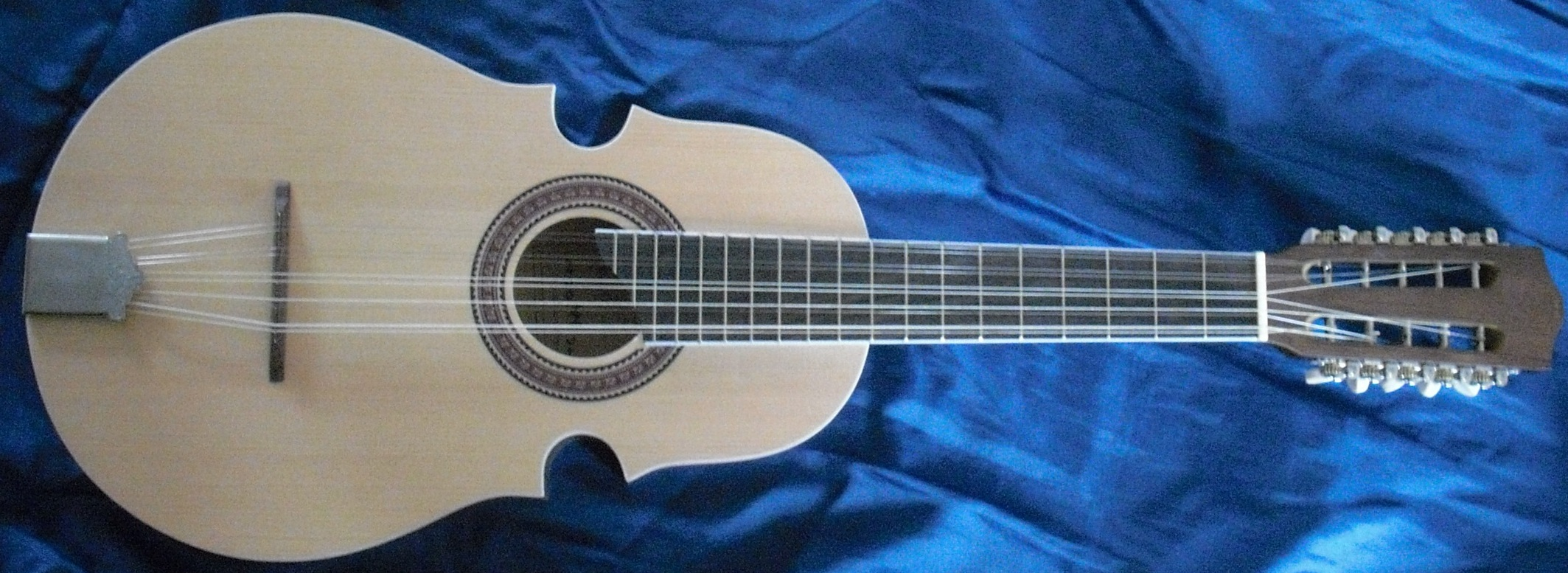
A Puerto Rican cuatro

The cuatro is the national instrument of Puerto Rico. Larger than a mandolin, it contains ten strings which generate complex tones and multiple harmonic series.

The Puerto Rican cuatro spans five courses, tuned in fourths from low to high B-e-a-d'-g',54321, with B and E in octaves and A, D and G in unisons.

Yomo Toro and his cuatro music became internationally known, when he performed the opening theme song to the 1971 Woody Allen film Bananas.

In the U.S., Toro's reputation as a cuatro player had already grown steadily throughout the 1950s and 60's. In the 1970s and 80's, his concert tours with the Fania All Stars and studio recordings on numerous Willie Colón and Héctor Lavoe albums, made him a musical sensation in Latin America.

His Christmas albums Asalto Navideño and Feliz Navidad became instant classics, and are now rare collector's items.

== Folkloric style ==
Yomo Toro preserved the traditional Puerto Rican form known as Jibaro music – folk music from the Puerto Rican hill country that is buoyant, romantic, humorous, and extremely life-affirming. Many of Toro's lyrics were arranged 10-line verses called decimas, a poetic Spanish form that was popular as early as the 17th century. African rhythms also influenced both Jibaro music, and Yomo Toro's own evolving style.

For orchestration and song structure, Yomo Toro often used the bomba format. For rhythm and instrumentation, he made heavy use of the traditional Barril de bomba – a Puerto Rican drum with African origins – and Toro improvised spiraling cuatro solos over the bomba rhythms.

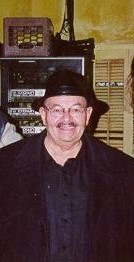
Yomo Toro at a jazz club in New York City in 2000

Though firmly grounded in Puerto Rican musical tradition, Yomo Toro's style was extremely textured and eclectic. As a studio musician for hundreds of album releases, he also played Latin jazz, classical guitar, bluegrass, and even R&B. As noted by The New York Times, "Mr. Toro absorbed all these influences, plus the African, Spanish and Creole folk traditions of his native Puerto Rico. The richness and variety of these sources is at least partly responsible for the depth, range and vitality of Mr. Toro's playing."

== International career ==
Toro played traditional Puerto Rican and Mexican music on guitar and cuatro in New York through the 1950s and '60s – with the singers Odilio González and Victor Rolón Santiago and with the Trio Los Panchos, the internationally famous Mexican bolero trio, Los Rivereños, Yomo Toro covered two famous compositions titled "Fuikiti" and "Una Pena En La Navidad" by Miguel Poventud copyrighted by Peer and covered on Fania recordings of Yomo Toro performances in Albums "Celebremos Navidad" and "Herencia"

External videos
- You can watch a video of Yomo Toro, in a live studio recording session on YouTube

He was hired to play on a Christmas-themed salsa record by Willie Colón called Asalto Navideño ("Christmas Assault") which included several of Toro's aguinaldos and songs from the Puerto Rican parranda, or caroling, tradition. Asalto Navideño became one of the most successful releases for Fania Records, and its fame solidified the cuatro's role in the salsa scene.

The success of Asalto Navideño led to a sequel in 1973, as well as a third holiday record in 1979 with Hector Lavoe and the singer Daniel Santos. On the covers of those two albums, Yomo Toro is dressed as Santa Claus. Short, round and joyous, Toro was well-suited to the role, and went on to reprise it in many holiday concerts.

Toro toured the world with the Fania All-Stars in the 1970s and recorded two solo albums for Fania, Romantico and Musica Para El Mundo Entero. During the height of the salsa era he also played on more albums with Willie Colón, Ismael Rivera, Larry Harlow, Cheo Feliciano, Típica 73, and many others.

== Musical legacy ==
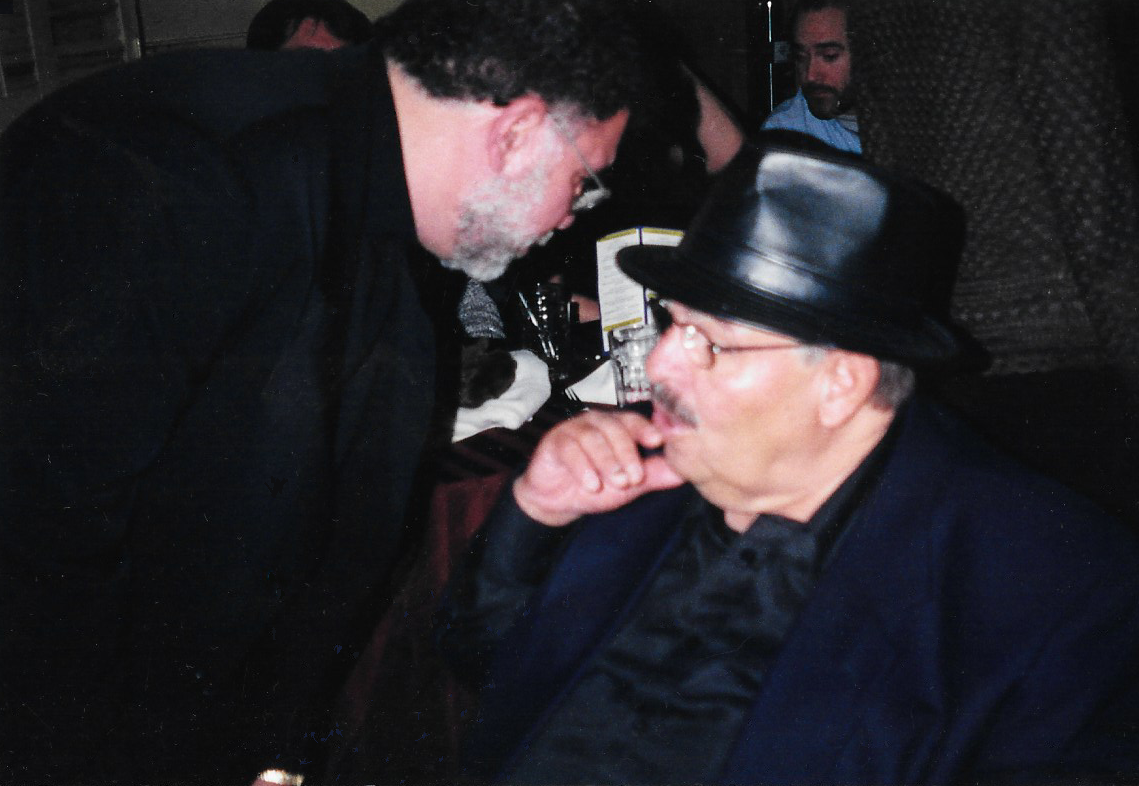
Yomo Toro at a jazz club in New York City in 2000

Yomo Toro's artistry with the cuatro was celebrated throughout the world. He recorded with major artists such as Cuban legend Arsenio Rodríguez and Arsenio's bassist Alfonso "El Panameño" Joseph.

Toro appeared in over 150 albums and over 20 solo albums on various record labels such as Island Records, Fania Records, Rounder, and Green Linnet Records. He also recorded four albums with Trio Los Panchos, including one featuring Eydie Gormé.

Toro crossed over to many other genres and recorded songs with Harry Belafonte, Paul Simon, Linda Ronstadt and David Byrne. He also worked on several film tracks such as Bananas by director Woody Allen and Crossover Dreams with Ruben Blades.

According to The New York Times, Yomo Toro "electrified his cuatro, performed as a soloist with salsa's flashy Fania All-Stars, and appeared on several hundred albums, ranging from straight jibaro to mainstream Latin-pop."

Despite his fame and musical virtuosity, Yomo Toro was a modest and unassuming man. He composed only one song about himself. It appeared on the Fania label as El Lechon de Cachete.

In 2000 he was inducted into the International Latin Music Hall of Fame.

== Television career ==
During the late 60s and early 70s, Toro hosted the "Yomo Toro Show." It aired on Channel 41 in New York (later known as Univision) and featured Yomo Toro's music, plus entertainment news and interviews of Latin celebrities.

Toro also played many bombas and aguinaldos on the children's television show Dora the Explorer.

== Later years ==
Yomo Toro was a member of the Toro family of Ensenada, Guanica. He died of kidney failure in Calvary Hospital in the Bronx, New York, on 30 June 2012. He was buried at Saint Michaels Cemetery in East Elmhurst, Queens

Yomo Toro was survived by his wife Minerva, his daughter Denise, his sisters Mirza, Iris, Gloria, Lydia and Milagros Toro; his brothers, Juan, Angel and Arcangel Toro; five grandchildren, and three great-grandchildren.

== Recorded works ==
Yomo Toro performed on hundreds of albums throughout his 60-year career. He also released over 20 solo albums on major record labels including Island Records, Fania Records, and Polygram. The following are some of his better-known recordings.

1. Asalto Navideño (Fania, 1972)
2. Los Rivereños Cuando Mexico Canta con Yomo Toro y su Conjunto (SEECO – Gold series – SCLP-9255) (SEECO 27.342 | Discophon)
3. Funky Jibaro (Island, 1988)
4. Gracias (Mango, 1990)
5. Las Manos de Oro (Xenophile Records, 1995)
6. Celebremos Navidad (Protel, 1996)
7. Celebrando Navidad (Ashe Records, 1999)
8. Romantico (1999)
9. Musica Para El Mundo Entero (Fania Records Barbaro Vinyl Lp 99.598 (1982) Cd Reissued (2000)
10. Alma de Ramito (Fania, 2000)
11. El Espíritu Jíbaro (The Jibaro Spirit), with Roswell Rudd (Sunnyside Records, 2007)
12. 24 Canciones Inolvidables de R. Hernandez (Combo, 2008)
13. La Herencia (Fania, 2008)

== See also ==
- List of Puerto Ricans
- Edwin Colón Zayas
- Andrés Jiménez, "el Jíbaro"
- El Cuatro (Spanish Wikipedia)
- Music of Puerto Rico
