= Crime Pays (Willie Colón and Héctor Lavoe album) =

1972 compilation album by Willie Colón

Compilation album by Willie Colón
- Released: 1972
- Genre: post-Boogaloo; Salsa music
- Label: Fania Records
- Producer: Jerry Masucci

Willie Colón chronology
Asalto Navideño Vol.2 (1972)	Crime Pays (1972)	Lo Mato (1973)

Professional ratings
Review scores
Source	Rating
AllMusic	4/5 stars
The Encyclopedia of Popular Music	3/5 stars

Crime Pays is a vintage collection of Willie Colón's early lounge recordings from the late 1960s and early 1970s mainly with Héctor Lavoe, including Guajirón, El Titán, Que Lío and Eso Se Baila Así.

== Track listing ==
1. "Che Che Colé" Colón - 3:30
2. "El Malo" Colón - 3:55
3. "Guisando" Colón, Lavoe - 4:00
4. "Jazzy" Colón - 4:00
5. "Juana Peña" Colón, Lavoe - 5:37
6. "Guajirón" Dimond - 5:59
7. "El Titán" Colón, Lavoe - 5:21
8. "Que Lío" Colón, Joe Cuba, Lavoe - 4:35
9. "Eso Se Baila Así" Colón - 5:15

== Personnel ==
- Len Bauman: photography
- Jon Child: liner notes
- Willie Colón: trombone, vocals
- Héctor Lavoe: vocals
- Jerry Masucci: producer
- Johnny Pacheco: recording director
- Izzy Sanabria: design
