= Cosa Nuestra (Willie Colón album) =

1969 studio album by Willie Colón

Studio album by Willie Colón
- Released: 1969
- Recorded: 1969
- Genre: Salsa
- Length: 33:58
- Label: Fania
- Producer: Jerry Masucci

Willie Colón chronology
| Guisando (1969) | Cosa Nuestra (1969) | Asalto Navideño (1970) |

Professional ratings
Review scores
| Source | Rating |
|---|---|
| AllMusic | 5/5 stars |
| The Encyclopedia of Popular Music | 3/5 stars |

Cosa Nuestra (Our Thing) is an album by Willie Colón featuring Héctor Lavoe. The album was the first by the duo to become a gold record, followed by La Gran Fuga (1971), El Juicio (1972) and Lo Mato (1973). The album was named one of the 50 greatest salsa albums of all time by Rolling Stone Magazine in October 2024.

== Track listing ==
| No. | Title | Writer(s) | Length |
|---|---|---|---|
| 1. | "Che Che Colé" | Willie Colón | 3:30 |
| 2. | "No Me Llores Más" | Willie Colón / Héctor Lavoe / Kent Gómez | 5:35 |
| 3. | "Ausencia" | Willie Colón / Héctor Lavoe | 5:10 |
| 4. | "Te Conozco" | Héctor Lavoe | 4:55 |
| 5. | "Juana Peña" | Willie Colón / Héctor Lavoe | 5:37 |
| 6. | "Sonero Mayor" | Willie Colón | 4:57 |
| 7. | "Sangrigorda" | D.R. | 4:14 |
| 8. | "Tú No Puedes Conmigo" | Willie Colón / Héctor Lavoe | 3:30 |

== Personnel ==
- Trombone - Eric Matos
- Composer - Hector Perez
- Cover Photo - Henri Wolfe
- Original Photography - Henri Wolfe
- Composer - Héctor Lavoe
- Engineer - Irv Greenbaum
- Design - Izzy Sanabria
- Producer - Jerry Masucci
- Recording Director - Johnny Pacheco
- Bongos, Cowbell - Jose Mangual Jr.
- Piano - José Torres "Professor"
- Composer - Kent Gomes
- Timbales - Little "Louie" Romero
- Congas - Milton Cardona
- Bass - Santi González
- Composer, Primary Artist - Willie Colón

== See also ==
- Willie Colón discography
