= La Gran Fuga =

1970 studio album by Willie Colón

Studio album by Willie Colón
- Released: 1970
- Genres: post-Boogaloo, salsa
- Label: Fania

Willie Colón chronology
Asalto Navideño (1970)	La Gran Fuga (1970)	El Juicio (1972)

Professional ratings
Review scores
Source	Rating
AllMusic	4.5/5 stars
The Encyclopedia of Popular Music	3/5 stars
MusicHound World	3.5/5 stars

La Gran Fuga (The Great Escape) is an album of Willie Colón & Héctor Lavoe issued in 1970 by Fania Records. It was the second of Colón and Lavoe's records to go gold, after Cosa Nuestra (1970) and before El Juicio (1972).

== Track listing ==
1. "Ghana' E" (Willie Colón & Héctor Lavoe) – 4:01
2. "Pa' Colombia" (C. Curet Alonso) – 5:47
3. "No Cambiare" (Willie Colón & Héctor Lavoe) – 3:37
4. "Sigue Feliz" (Carlos Román) – 4:12
5. "Barrunto" (C. Curet Alonso) – 5:52
6. "Abuelita" (Willie Colón & Héctor Lavoe) – 4:21
7. "Panameña" (Willie Colón & Héctor Lavoe) – 6:36
8. "Canción Para Mi Suegra" – 0:55

== Personnel ==
- Composer - C. Alonso Curet
- Composer - Carlos Román
- Linear Notes - Ernesto Lechner
- Composer, Vocals - Héctor Lavoe
- Design, Writer - Izzy Sanabria
- Producer - Jerry Masucci
- Recording Director - Johnny Pacheco
- Bongos - Jose Mangual
- Piano - José Torres "Professor"
- Timbales - Louie "Timbalito" Romero
- Congas - Milton Cardona
- Bass - Santi González
- Writer - Vinnie Alonso
- Trombone - Willie Campbell
- Composer, Leader, Primary Artist, Trombone - Willie Colón
