= El gran varón =

Salsa song by Omar Alfanno and sung by Willie Colón

Song by Willie Colón

from the album Top Secrets
- Language: Spanish
- Released: 1989
- Recorded: 1986–1989
- Genre: Salsa
- Length: 6:53
- Label: Fania Records
- Songwriter: Omar Alfanno
- Producer: Willie Colón

Willie Colón singles chronology
"Primera noche de amor" (1989)	"El gran varón" (1989)	"Cuando fuiste mujer" (1989)

"El gran varón", (English: The Great Man) also known as «Simón, el gran varón», or Simón is a salsa song written in 1986 by Omar Alfanno and sung by Willie Colón. The song narrates the story of Simón, a trans woman who is rejected by her father for her identity and dies presumably of AIDS, alone in a hospital in New York.

Despite not being released as a single, the song remains as one of the most listened from Willie Colón, as well as being one of his most recognized across Hispanic America, Spain and globally.

== Release and success ==
The song was written in 1986 by the Panamanian composer Omar Alfanno and was sung by Willie Colón with his group Legal Alien. It was included in the album Top Secrets in 1989, the last album produced by Fania. The record went gold and platinum and received a Grammy nomination for Best Tropical Latin Performance. "El gran varón" peaked at number 13 on the Hot Latin Songs chart in the United States. The song was at the top of musical lists in ten countries and ranks # 23 Billboard's list of 50 best Latin songs of all time.

== Historical value ==
"El gran varón" tells the story of Simón, a father's pride and joy. Simón's father is sure his son will follow in his footsteps and be "a great man." Simón leaves her country to study abroad. Simón's father pays her a visit one day and meets someone unfamiliar in women's clothing - Simón's father is shocked when Simón reveals herself. Simón's father flatly rejects her while the chorus argues with itself, nature cannot be changed—a Masculist sentiment held by Simon's dad, Andrés. The lyrical contrast immediately follows in the chorus: a bent tree can never be straightened—the Spanish idiom for "a leopard cannot change its spots". Simón is, indeed, comfortable in her identity. As the years pass, the father makes up with the idea of his daughter's identity. He realizes his daughter Simón has not called in a while, until finally Andrés learns that his daughter died alone in a hospital, presumably of AIDS. According to Alfanno, "El gran varón" is a song about a friend of his.

"El gran varón" was the first Spanish-language song to broach the subject of AIDS; however, it did not mention the disease by name, saying Simón died "of a strange disease." The song is a symbol for LGBT rights, as it talks about transphobia.

== Versions ==
There are two versions made by Willie Colón; the original is 6:54 minutes long. In this version Simón is born in 1956 and dies in 1986 ("Willie Colón, Super éxitos"). In the second version, the song is 6:03 minutes long, Simón is born in 1963 and dies in 1993 ("Willie Colón, Sólo éxitos" or "Willie Colón y Rubén Blades, Frente a frente").

The song has been covered by other groups and artists. Sonora Kaliente covered it, selling six million copies. In 2007, Danny Frank, a Colombian singer, did a version of the song. A reggae version was done by Eclipse Reggae. A rap version was made by Jako. Cumbia versions were made by Damas Gratis and La Sonora Tropicana.

== In popular media ==
Simón, el gran varón is also the name of a Mexican movie filmed in 2002 and inspired by the topic of the song. It was directed by Miguel Barreda Delgado and features artists Alberto Estrella, Victor Carpinteiro, and Alicia Encinas.

== See also ==
- Pedro Navaja
