= Recio, Recio Mis Creadorez =

Studio album by Los Creadorez del Pasito Duranguense de Alfredo Ramírez
- Released: January 30, 2007
- Recorded: 2006
- Genres: Norteño, Ranchero, Polka, Cumbia
- Label: Disa
- Producer: Alfredo Ramírez Corral

Los Creadorez del Pasito Duranguense de Alfredo Ramírez chronology
Recio, Recio Mis Creadorez (2007)	Las Favoritas Los Creadores del Pasito de Durango: Corridos Rancheras y Más (2007)

Alternative cover

Recio, Recio Mis Creadorez (Eng.: Hurry, Hurry My Creators) is the title of a studio album released by Chicago-based ensemble Los Creadorez del Pasito Duranguense de Alfredo Ramírez. This album became their first number-one set on the Billboard Top Latin Albums, and was released in a standard CD presentation and as a CD/DVD combo.

== Track listing ==
The track listing from Billboard and Allmusic.

No.	Title	Writer(s)	Length
1.	"Cada Vez Que Pienso en Tí "Amor Perdóname""	Eduardo Rodarte	2:27
2.	"Quiero Ver Tus Ojos"	Héctor Montemayor	2:05
3.	"Jesusita en Chihuahua"	Quirino Cortés	2:14
4.	"Visité a Mi Padre"	Montemayor	3:29
5.	"Homenaje Duranguense"	Alfredo Ramírez Corral	2:44
6.	"El Preso Mijarez"	Ismael Mijarez, Corral	2:53
7.	"Paloma Palomita"	Corral	1:55
8.	"La Santísima Muerte"	Raymundo Padilla	2:58
9.	"El Circo"	Lian Czenstochusky	2:14
10.	"Extrañando Mi Terre"	Corral	3:17
11.	"Te Pido Que Te Quedes"	Corral	2:36
12.	"El Abandonado"	Severiano Briseño	2:50
13.	"Que Levante la Mano"	Almos Valle	2:36
14.	"Cada Vez Que Pienso en Tí "Amor Perdónmame" (Norteña)"	Rodarte	3:06

=== Collector's Edition ===
No.	Title	Writer(s)	Length
15.	"Para Mi Madre"	Mijarez, Corral	3:44
16.	"Cada Vez Que Pienso en Tí "Amor Perdóname" (DVD)"	Rodarte	3:06
17.	"La Santísima Muerte (DVD)"	Padilla	2:58
18.	"Que Lástima (DVD)"	Roque González	2:05
19.	"Quisiera Ser Una Lágrima (DVD)"	Teodoro Bello	2:14
20.	"Bonus Material (DVD)"

== Personnel ==
This information from Allmusic.

- Alfredo Ramírez Corral — Clarinet, guitar, arranger, keyboards, engineer, executive producer, digital mastering, mixing
- Jesús Ortiz — Engineer, mixing
- Armando Aguirre Ramírez — Percussion, tambora

== Chart performance ==
Chart (2007)	Peak position
USA Billboard Top Latin Albums	1
US Billboard Regional Mexican Albums	1
US Billboard 200	31

Year-End Charts

Chart (2007)	Peak position
US Billboard Top Latin Albums Year-End Chart	17
US Billboard Top Regional Mexican Albums Year-End Chart	3

== Sales and certifications ==
Region	Certification	Certified units/sales
United States (RIAA)	2× Platinum (Latin)	200,000^{^}
^{^} Shipments figures based on certification alone.
