= Bomba (Puerto Rico) =

Traditional musical style of Puerto Rico

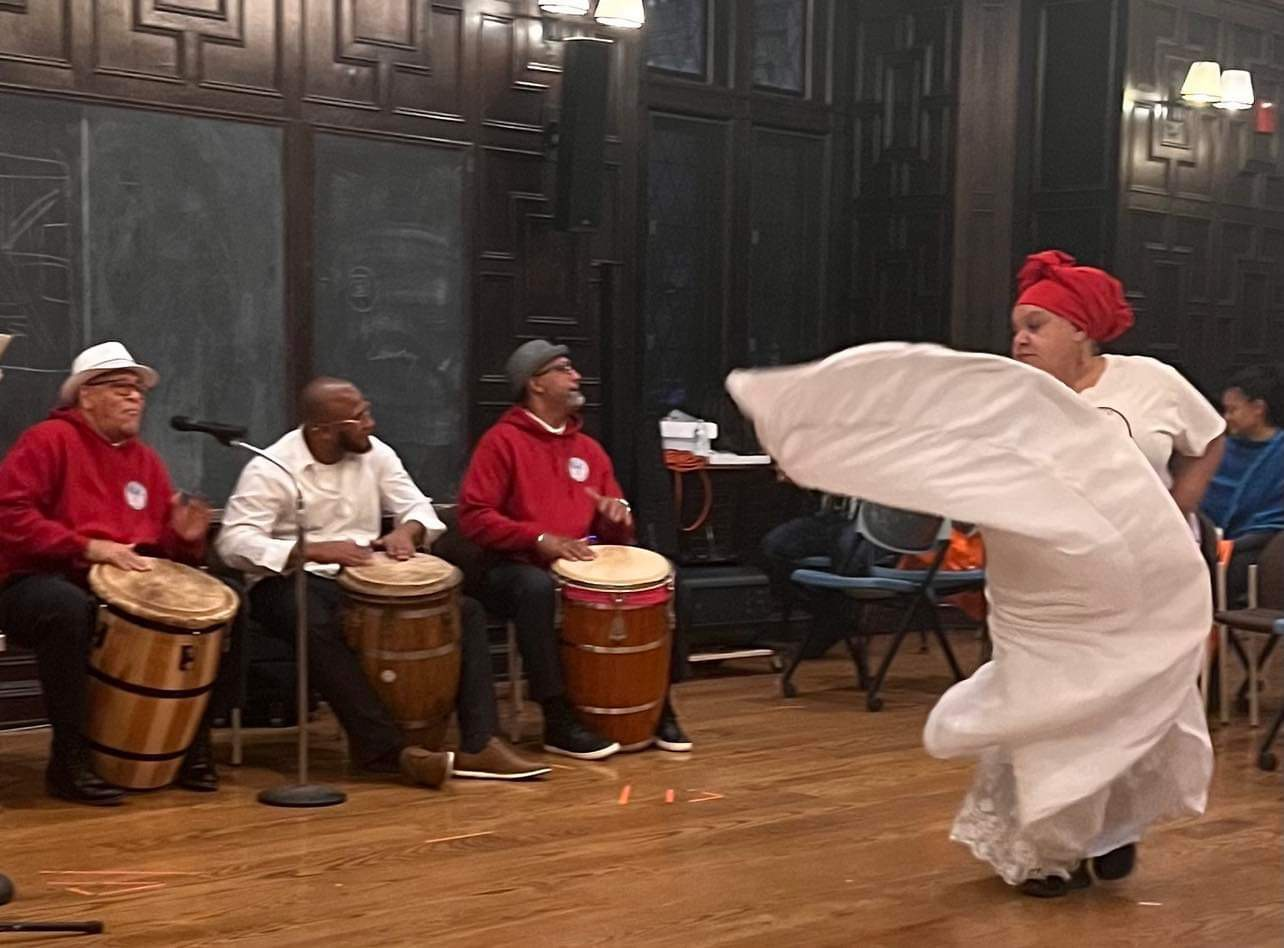
- Bomba dancer and drummers
- Stylistic origins: African music
- Cultural origins: 17th century, Puerto Rico
- Typical instruments: Barril de bomba; subidor; cuá; maracas

Other topics
- Music of Puerto Rico

Bomba is an umbrella term that refers to a variety of musical styles and associated dances originating in Puerto Rico. It was developed during the 17th century by enslaved Africans and their descendants on sugar plantations along coastal towns, most notably Loiza, Mayagüez, Ponce, and San Juan. It is the island's oldest musical tradition.

Bomba reflects a syncretism of Puerto Rico’s many cultural groups. It incorporates Taíno instruments such as maracas; characteristics from traditional European dances like rigadoons, quadrilles and mazurkas; and drum ensembles and drummer–dancer interactions that bear close resemblance to a number of African musical styles. The music also evolved through contact between enslaved populations from different Caribbean colonies and regions, including the Dutch colonies, Cuba, Santo Domingo (Dominican Republic), and Saint-Domingue (Haiti), and it has notable roots in Congolose and Afro-French cultural expressions.

After slavery was abolished, bomba was commercialized in the mid-20th century and incorporated into the island’s folklore. In the 1990s, the bomba and plena group Hermanos Emmanueli Náter brought the genre to the streets for public consumption in the form of "Bombazos" that were designed for communal participation.

== History ==
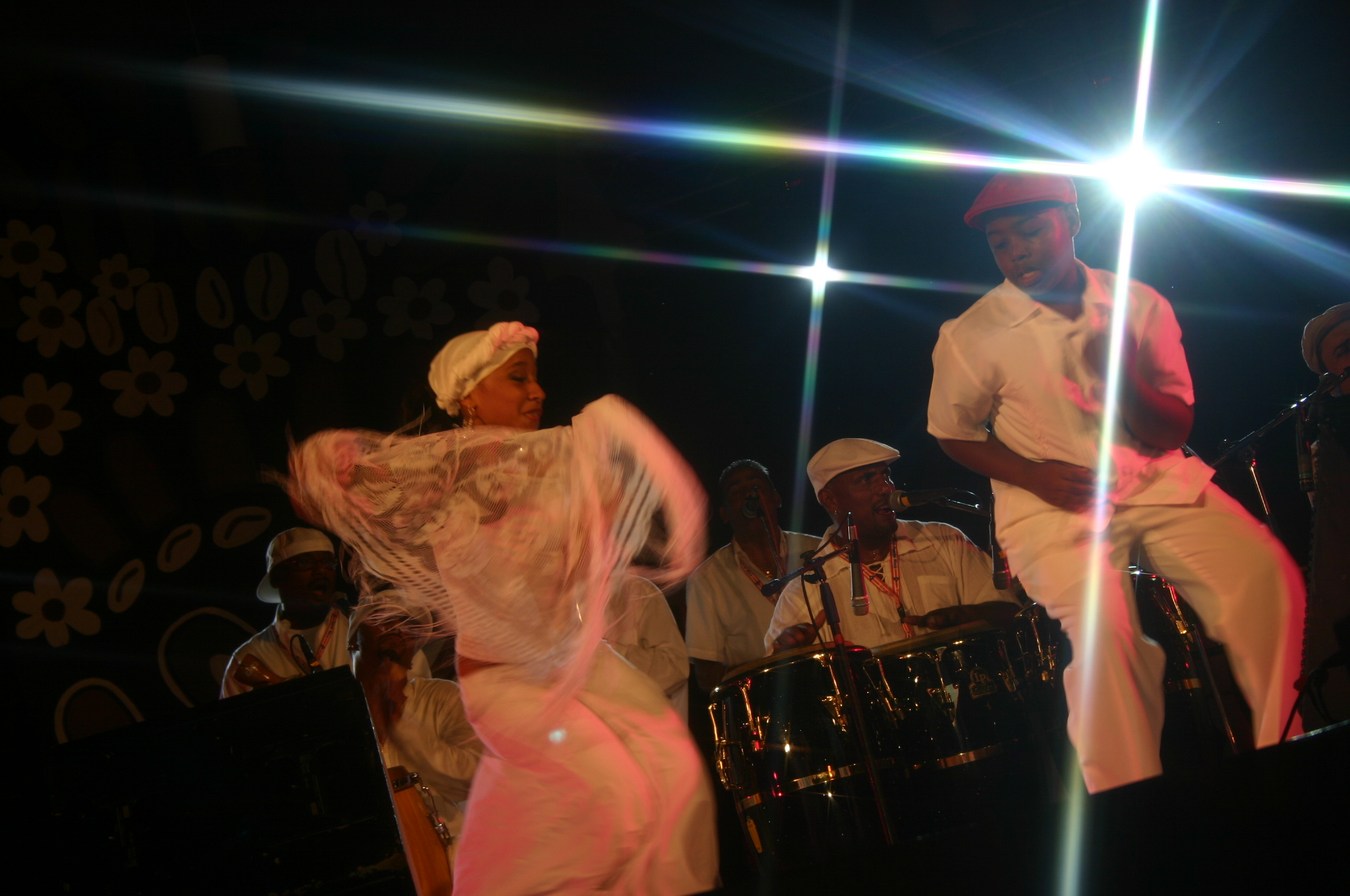
Bomba dance in Guaynabo, Puerto Rico

The roots of the bomba tradition can be traced to the Asante people of Ghana. The word bomba is derived from the Akan and Bantu languages of Africa.

Bomba was developed by West African slaves and their descendants on sugar plantations in Puerto Rico during the early European colonial period. Despite lacking a shared language due to their varied origins, they found common ground in music. Cane workers used music and dance to release feelings of sadness, anger, and resistance; they were also used to communicate and plan rebellions and were integrated into baptism and marriage celebrations. The first documentation of bomba dates to 1797, when botanist André Pierre Ledru described his impressions of inhabitants dancing and singing popular bombas in Voyage aux îles de Ténériffe, la Trinité, Saint-Thomas, Sainte-Croix et Porto Ricco.

Distinct regional styles of bomba developed across Puerto Rico, each possessing its own characteristics. For example, the style performed in Ponce is distinguished by the use of large drums which are mounted vertically.

Bomba was also significantly shaped by Haitian influences. The music of Haitian slaves, many of whom were brought to Puerto Rico during the Haitian Revolution, contributed to the yubá rhythm typical to bomba in Mayagüez.

=== 20th century ===
For much of its history, bomba was marginalized due to heavy racialization and its perception as a primitive style, and it remained largely confined to the areas of Puerto Rico with substantial Afro-Boricua populations such as the municipalities of Loíza, Ponce, Mayagüez, and Guayama. A major shift occurred in the 1940s and 1950s, when artists such as Rafael Cortijo and Ismael Rivera popularized bomba internationally by introducing it to other parts of the Americas and beyond. In these new settings, it was fused with various national and regional musical styles to create hybrid genres. Within Puerto Rico, however, bomba was insulated from these developments and thus retained its traditional character.

== Characteristics of bomba ==
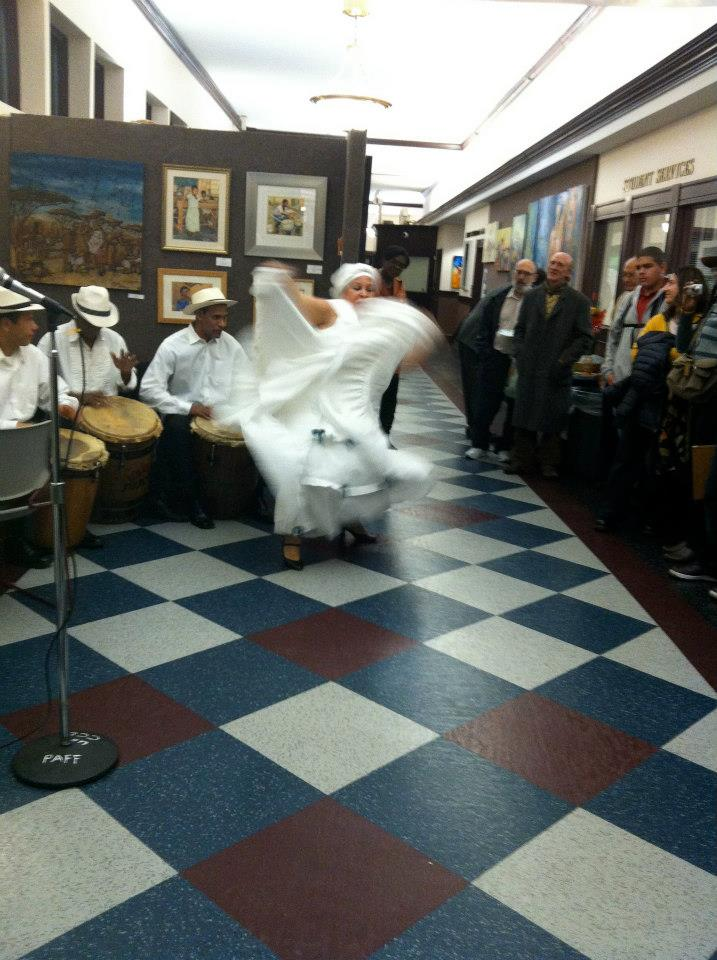
Bomba drummers and dancer

Bomba is a secular, recreational style of music, characterized by a dynamic dialog between the primo (lead drummer)—who plays the subidor (high drum)—and lead dancer. The lead dancer performs a series of spontaneous movements which the primo interprets to deliver a rhythmic accompaniment, while one or more buleador (low drum) players maintain the basic rhythm. Therefore, it is the drummer who follows the lead set by the dancer, as opposed to the more common practice of the dancer following the drummer. When there are no dancers, the primo improvises.

Most bomba songs are sung in Spanish. Vocals are provided by a lead singer who either performs solo or with an ensemble of three or more singers. When there are multiple vocalists, bomba features a dynamic comparable to Cuban son, wherein the lead singer performs the melody while the others harmonize. The lead singer improvises the verses.

The lyrics of bomba songs typically concern topics of immediate community and everyday life. For example, the song "Palo e bandera" tells the story of a love triangle between a female singer; her husband, the primo; and a female dancer. The wife realizes her husband is cheating on her with the dancer and proceeds to exact revenge on the dance floor. Older bombas often incorporated words and expressions from former colonial African languages and older Caribbean dialects.

=== Regional distinctions ===
In the northern part of the island, the melody can be interpreted by both men and women. In the south, only women sing. To reinforce regional distinctions, bomba is divided into two main rhythms: sones (south) and seises (north). Sub variations are characterized by hand position on the drum and what part of the drum is played.

Bomba dancers and musicians typically appropriate small spaces in popular areas "to make culture” (“hacer cultura”). This phrase is repeated by musicians when they’re asked about their motivation to play bomba.

=== Dance ===
In the Batey (sugar workers' town) or a Sobera'o (circle or dance area), the Subidor will score sounds for the steps that the dancer makes, and the Buleador or Follower, follows the rhythm that is constantly played until the “Cantador/a” (singer) says so. The dancer enters the Batey to stroll around, showing off, marking their territory. The dancer greets the Primo Barrel and starts doing “Piquetes” (improvised bomba steps).

=== Rhythmic dialogue ===
The dancer challenges the Primo Barrel Player (“Tocador/a”), engaging in a rhythmic dialogue and making it difficult to follow them. When the dancer finishes providing the “Piquetes”, they bow again to the Primo Barrel and the next dancer repeats the process. The “Piquetes” must have "elegance, firmness and shape." Depending on the rhythm, the dancer then has to raise the intensity of the music by increasingly complicating their steps to gradually escalate the challenge directed to the lead drummer. Experienced dancers finish the challenge at the highest peak of intensity they can achieve before getting tired or losing rhythm.

During the dance, sometimes the audience shouts "Speak!" This is because the dancer is having a musical conversation with the bomba drum (Primo) through their “Piquetes” (bomba steps). In this conversation, any dance must be markable by the Primo, and anything the Primo plays must be danceable.

=== Dancer attire ===
Traditionally, “Bailadores” (male dancers) perform their “Piquetes” with their body and the “Bailadoras” (female dancers) perform with the body and / or skirt with the petticoat. The bomba traditional dress for men is white hat, white shirt and black or white pants. The women wear turbans, white shirt and skirts with petticoats. Petticoats are handmade to show them off in a flirtatious way for men and to create envy among other female dancers. The way skirts are used and held in bomba dancing is unique.

== Instruments ==
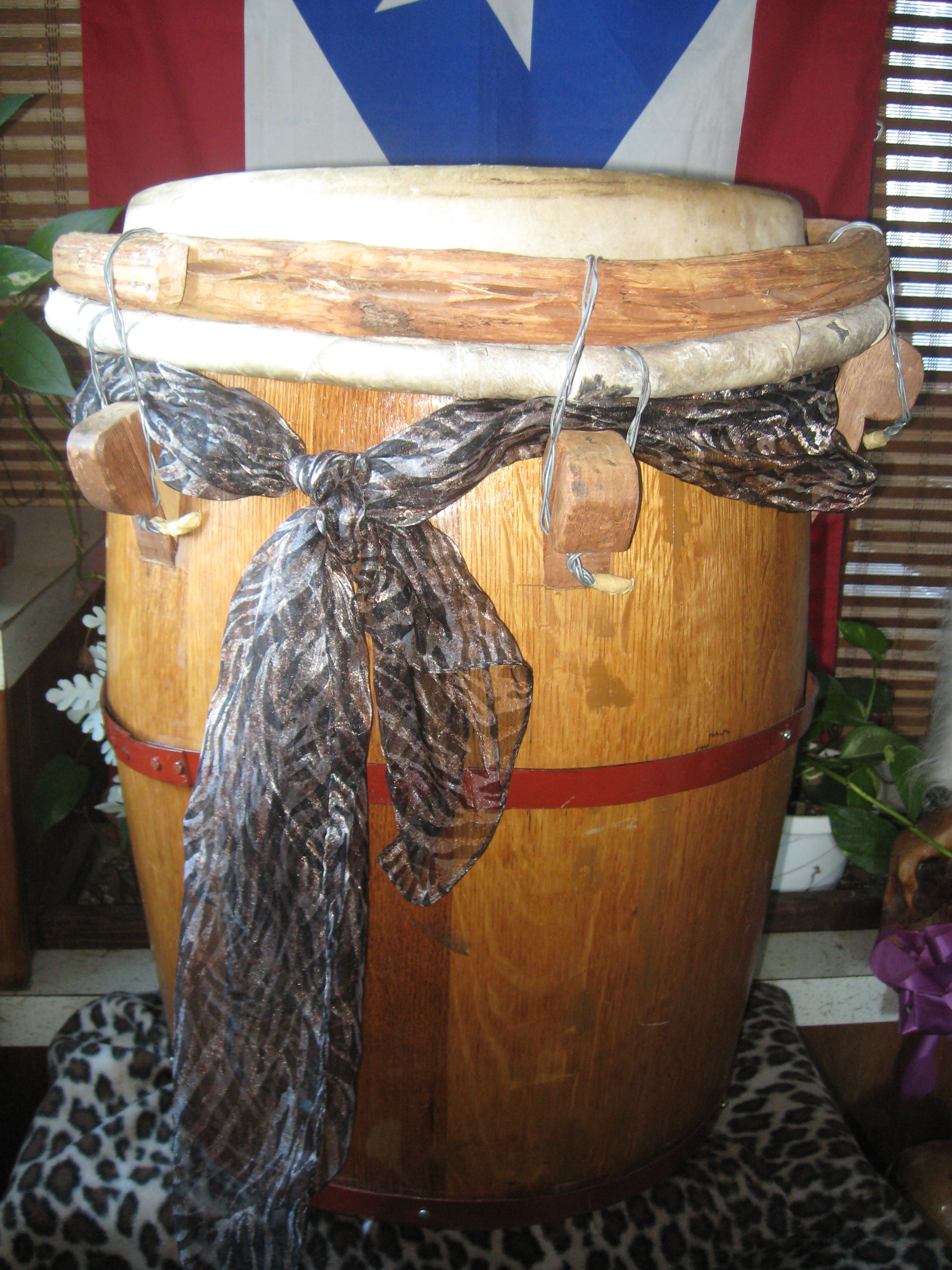
Barril de Cuña

The main instruments of bomba are barriles de bombas (drums), maracas (shaken, single body gourds with handles), and cuás (solid idiophones made of bamboo). Maracas contain internal strikers rather than seeds or small stones. The güiro was, at one time, used in Loiza in place of maracas, but that is no longer common.

The traditional barriles de bombas are built from rum barrels and goatskin. Bomba ensembles must have at least two barriles of slightly different diameters. The smaller, higher, drum will typically be a solo drum, playing the subidor/primo part. The larger, lower, drum(s) will typically support the basic rhythm by playing the accompanying buleador/segundo part.

The drum called "Primo" replicates every single move of the dancer. This is called "Repique."

== Rhythmic Styles ==
There are 10 rhythmic styles of bomba, some with their own sub-styles.

- Sicá: the most common and widespread style; based on 3-3-2 rhythm pattern found throughout Latin American music. Its sub-style, Danué, is believed to be the transliteration of the French term ‘Danois’ or Danish, possibly relating to Denmark’s control over the French Caribbean Island colony of St. Croix from 1733-1917.
- Cunyá: played in a moderately slow tempo, this rhythm’s name is similar to the name of the wooden peg used to fasten drumheads (cunya).
- Belén: this southern style is the slowest and sparsest of all bomba styles. Its name may be a transformation of the French Caribbean term “belé”.
- Calindá: The name of this style is connected to rhythmic patterns found in the Spanish, English, and French Caribbean. Its sub-style, Hoyo Mula, is associated with Santurce performer and teacher, Jesús Cepeda. Hoyo Mula was an old neighborhood east of Santurce that was later incorporated into the municipality of Carolina. This sub-style is characterized by a high/low pulsation similar to Brazilian Samba.
- Cuembé/Güembé: The most common style after Sicá. This rhythm has two sub-styles: Balancé and Gracimá. Balancé is a moderate tempo sub-style that closely resembles the cuembé, but its first low stroke is played closer to the center of the drum. Gracimá is played in a moderate to fast tempo, and its name is allegedly a colloquial derivative of the French word “gracieusment”.
- Seis Corrido: The rapid-fire style of the Loíza tradition. Corrido signifies fast-paced playing. Drummers often vary the first pattern of this style by adding subtle “ghost” notes that are played more quietly, giving the impression that the pattern has continuous sixteenth notes. Its sub-style, Bambulé, commonly spelled bamboula or bamboulaé, was found in New Orleans, Haiti, Cuba, and other Caribbean French and Spanish colonies. Bambulé was one of the main sub-styles adapted by Rafael Cortijo.
- Yubá: the most common 6/8 rhythm of bomba, played at a moderately fast tempo. Its compound meter makes it more challenging for musicians and dancers. It has three main sub-styles: Yubá corrido, which is played at a faster tempo, Yubá cuembé, a variant of Yubá Corrido, and Leró del sur, a slow style common in Ponce and surrounding areas. The word ‘Leró’ in the name is believed to be a contraction of the French “le rose”, a circle dance formation. In Santurce, there is a variant known as Leró Cangrejero, referring to the town’s former name, San Mateo de Cangrejos. In Loíza, the yubá is called corvé and its played consistently at a fast tempo. Also associated with Loíza is the Roulé, a variant that gets its name from the popular song “Roulé Sondá”.
- Holandés: The name Holandés means “from Holland”, suggesting a connection to Dutch slave cultures in the southern sugar cane plantations. This sole 4/4 style is characterized by syncopation and persistent off-beat accents. There is an holandés rhythm in 6/8 that barely resembles the original style and is more akin to a yubá sub-style.
- Clave Tres: Devised by percussionist Raúl Berríos Sánchez, this is the most recent rhythm to be adopted into the bomba repertoire. Berríos Sánchez has adapted the main concept of this rhythm for other forms of music such as salsa and Latin jazz.
- Mariandá: A 6/8 pattern associated with an inland mountain style known as “jíbaro” music. It is argued that this style is related to the seemingly distant Aguinaldo, a style of Christmas jíbaro music.

== Performers ==
Today there are many groups playing bomba both as a traditional style and as a fusion with some other style. The most well-known traditional players are the Cepeda Family who have been playing bomba for generations and the Ayala family, who are a family with a tradition of arts and crafts as well as bomba music. In the 1940s, patriarch Rafael Cepeda formed an ensemble to perform bomba on the radio. He later developed a stage version of bomba and presented it in San Juan’s major hotels.

Los Pleneros de la 21 are bomba and plena musicians who travelled to Hawaii to perform for the Puerto Rican diaspora in Hawaii. Founded in South Bronx, this group of musicians and dancers have produced five albums, and they are also known to provide workshops for all ages in the community of El Barrio in Manhattan.

Willie Colón adds occasional bomba breaks to his songs, most particularly in sections of his biggest solo hit, "El gran varón". Ricky Martin also mixes a bit of authentic bomba rhythm with other Latino influences in his aptly named song La Bomba. In California, it has been popularized by Maestros de Bomba en la Bahía at La Peña Cultural Center.

In 1998, Son del Batey was founded in San Juan, Puerto Rico, by a group of college students at the University of Puerto Rico in Mayagüez. 1998 marked the 100-year anniversary of the United States invasion of Puerto Rico, and a time when popular discourse focused around national identity and colonialism throughout the island.

In Puerto Rico, knowledge about bomba is present in the oral cultures of protected family spaces, mainly the Cepedas (Santurce) and the Ayalas (Loiza). These families are largely responsible for bomba's institutional recognition on a national and international level. Other families include the Alduén (Mayagüez), Negrón and Pizarro (Cataño), Mangual and Nadal (Mayagüez), Archeval (Ponce), and Brothers Emmanuelli Náter (José, Jorge and Victor, students and friends of the Cepeda). They created the center for Cultural Research of Eternal Roots (Centro de Investigación Cultural Raíces Eternas) (CICRE in Spanish) in Puerto Rico during the 1990s so-called "Bombazos". They were devoted to "get down" the bomba from the high stage, so that the Puerto Ricans and everybody else had more participation and learning in this folklore music. Thanks to this, today there are “Bombazos” in many parts of Puerto Rico and the United States.

== See also ==
- List of Puerto Ricans
- Music of Puerto Rico
