= Los Creadorez =

Regional Mexican band

Los Creadorez is a regional Mexican band based in Chicago, Illinois, United States, and led by Alfredo Ramírez Corral.

== History ==
In 2006, alongside co-founder Ismael Mijares, Corral put together one of the first stateside duranguense bands, and achieved great success. Los Creadorez del Pasito Duranguense was created when Corral and Mijares left Montéz de Durango, taking most of its members and only leaving the Terrazas family in the band. DISA Latin Music released two singles, "Que Levante La Mano" and "Cada Vez Que Pienso En Ti", both of which made appearances on the Billboard Regional Mexican charts. Los Creadorez interpreted their decade of success and fans' acceptance of their new package as a sign of duranguense’s staying power. As the genre rounded its first ten years, sales increased and interest arose far outside the city of Chicago, and duranguense artists looked to the veterans for direction. Corral and Mijarez – having been around as long as anyone – found themselves in the position of being trend-setters. Los Creadorez's first album, Recio, Recio Mis Creadorez, was released in late January 2007.

On February 23, 2007, they won the Best New Artist award at Premios Lo Nuestro and also performed at the Billboard Music Awards of 2007. They were nominees for Regional Mexican Airplay Track of the Year for "Que Lastima". They performed in several sell-out arenas and stadiums in United States. On a signing meeting, they congregated eight thousand people. In November 2008, they were nominated for a Latin Grammy for their album, "Listos, Montados, Y Armados".

In 2013, as a result of duranguense waning in popularity, the band shortened their name to Los Creadorez and changed to the norteño-banda style. Shortly thereafter, they changed their style to norteño-sax.

== Band members ==
- Alfredo Ramírez Corral – lead vocals and keyboards
- Ismael Mijares – bass guitar and co-ordination
- Armando Aguirre – tambora and percussion
- Agustín Fregoso Delgado – backing vocal
- Domingo César Ruelas Llamas – trombone and saxophone
- Francisco Paco López (Tecladista Mexicano)
- Miguel Ángel Lara Gómez – drums
- José Saúl Lara Gómez – trombone and saxophone

== Discography ==
- 2006: Libres
- 2007: Recio, Recio Mis Creadorez
- 2007: Corridos, Rancheras y Más...
- 2008: Listos, Montados y Armados
- 2009: En Vivo Desde Durango
- 2009: Avanzando en la Vida
- 2010: Puras de Jose Alfredo
- 2013: Tercia de Ases
- 2013: En Vivo Homenaje a José Alfredo Jimenez
- 2013: A Todisima Banda
- 2014: Norteño Rancho
- 2016: Seguimos de Pie
- 2018: Sólo Dejé Yo a Mi Padre
- 2020: No Quiero Limosna
