= El Cantante =

2007 biographical film directed by Leon Ichaso

- Theatrical release poster
- Directed by: Leon Ichaso
- Screenplay by: Leon Ichaso; David Darmstaedter; Todd Anthony Bello
- Story by: David Darmstaedter; Todd Anthony Bello
- Produced by: Julio Caro; Jennifer Lopez; Simon Fields; David Maldonado
- Starring: Jennifer Lopez; Marc Anthony
- Cinematography: Claudio Chea
- Edited by: David Tedeschi
- Music by: Andres Levin
- Production companies: Nuyorican Productions; R-Caro Productions
- Distributed by: Picturehouse
- Release dates: September 12, 2006 (TIFF); August 3, 2007 (United States)
- Running time: 106 minutes
- Country: United States
- Languages: English; Spanish
- Box office: $24.5 million (including DVD sales)

El Cantante (The Singer) is a 2006 American biographical drama film directed by Leon Ichaso and starring singers Jennifer Lopez and Marc Anthony. The film is based on the life of the late salsa singer Héctor Lavoe, portrayed by Anthony. The film is told from the viewpoint of Puchi, Hector's wife, portrayed by Lopez. The film premiered at the 2006 Toronto International Film Festival, and was released in the United States on August 3, 2007, by Picturehouse.

According to Box Office Mojo, El Cantante is the twenty-eighth highest-grossing musical biopic of all time.

== Plot ==
Puchi talks about her late husband, salsa legend Héctor Lavoe "El Cantante De Los Cantantes" ("The singer of all the singers"), during a 2002 interview. Héctor Pérez leaves Puerto Rico, even though his father tries to persuade him not to go because if he does he'll lose a father. Héctor decides to go anyway against his father's will in an attempt to pursue his dreams. On his first night in the city he meets Eddie and discovers the new sound of salsa flowing through the streets. He eventually becomes the lead singer in a salsa group performing in a bar. One night he is approached by salsa musicians Willie Colón and Johnny Pacheco. Johnny offers them a deal with Fania Records Company and Hector accepts. The company also suggests that he change his name to Héctor Lavoe. "Lavoe" meaning "the voice" in French.

Héctor is falling for Puchi, a girl he saw dancing at the club where he was allowed entry and also to perform by her brother Papo, the club manager. Papo invites Héctor to the sweet 16 party he is throwing at his apartment for his sister Puchi and there they get to speak further since noticing each other at the club and begin to further fall in love. He confesses to her that his mother died when he was young, his brother was killed the night he came to New York and that he didn't have many people in his life. She tells him that they'll take care of each other. It is revealed that Héctor was cheating on Puchi with another girl named Carmen. Puchi reveals that Carmen and she were pregnant with a baby of his at the same time. But she is the only woman of his life because he chose her. They eventually get married and have a son named Tito. On a night of hard partying, Héctor catches Eddie doing drugs and does so too. This will be the start of his drug addiction.

Through the years, after Héctor's consistent tardiness to gigs, Willie grows tired of Héctor's irresponsibility and decides to go solo. Héctor's drug and alcohol addiction continues to grow stronger and becomes very noticeable. Puchi is infuriated when she finds Tito eating alone and Héctor shooting up while the gas was on. She begs Héctor to quit the drugs and to turn his life around for their son and because he is always high and is missing out and she loves him.

One night, Puchi wakes up to Héctor sitting with a gun staring into space, suicidally depressed. In fear she sends him to rehab. Puchi can't help feeling extremely guilty when Héctor's sister Priscilla blames all of Héctor's problems on her. She later takes him out and he is put on medication. A jealous Héctor calls Puchi a whore and frequently accuses her of having affairs with many different men. Héctor maintains sobriety and takes his family to Puerto Rico for vacation. When Héctor tries to reconcile with his father after leaving against his will, he rejects Héctor. This causes him more pain. He is diagnosed with HIV and advises Puchi to get tested as well. He maintains sobriety for a while but soon has a relapse and goes back to his old ways. Puchi and Héctor fight often and it usually ends with him leaving the house and then coming back and apologizing to her.

Tito is killed when his friend accidentally shoots him while playing with the gun Héctor kept in the house. This scars Héctor for the rest of his life. In the interview, Puchi admits that Héctor was never the same after that, and he died along with their son. She says everyone expected too much from him. Héctor confesses to Willie that he loves Puchi and that he wishes he would've done things differently, but it's too late and nothing is the same anymore. Willie encourages him to perform at a gig in Puerto Rico. At the concert, there is less than half of the audience due to bad managing and advertising. Still, he decides to perform for the few people who still showed up while it starts raining. He just couldn't hold in all the pain anymore. The depression and guilt are too much for Héctor to handle and it drives him to attempt suicide by jumping out a window. He survives the fall and lives another 5 years.

Puchi is seen in her new apartment, listening to a voice mail from Hector, wishing her a happy birthday and that he'll always be there and love her. She smiles and begins to dance while looking at a picture of her and Héctor on the wall. The movie ends with Héctor performing and the credits revealing that he died at the age of 46 of AIDS from sharing needles. It is also revealed that Puchi died shortly after this interview in 2002.

== Cast ==
- Marc Anthony as Héctor Lavoe
- Jennifer Lopez as Nilda Georgina "Puchi" Román
- Federico Castelluccio as Jerry Masucci
- Nelson Diaz as Johnny Pacheco
- Vincent Laresca as Ralph Mercado
- Víctor Manuelle as Rubén Blades
- John Ortiz as Willie Colón
- Antone Pagán as Puchi's Brother "Papo"
- Kaly Cordova as Families member

== Release ==
El Cantante, which has an MPAA rating of R, was first premiered at the 2006 Toronto International Film Festival in September 2006. It was then released to over 542 cinemas on August 3, 2007. The film opened at No. 12 at the U.S. Box Office, grossing $3,202,035 during its opening weekend. It averaged around $6,000 per theater. The following week, it grossed $1,401,148 and fell to No. 16. It left the chart at No. 115 on the week of September 28, 2007, after grossing $1,465. El cantante grossed $7,556,712 domestically and $354,820 overseas, totaling $7.9 million.

Charlotte O'Sullivan of the Evening Standard said the "film did not go down well" at the box office, crediting its lack of commercial success to Lopez and Anthony "know[ing] nothing about salsa" and its "negative view of the Latino community by focusing on Lavoe's drug use and death from Aids", which had sparked controversy. The film's DVD was released on October 30, 2007. It became a hit, ranking at No. 8 on the DVD/Home Rentals chart at Box Office Mojo, and had grossed $16.61 million in DVD sales as of December 23, 2007.

=== Critical reception ===
Following its Toronto premiere, El Cantante earned mostly negative reviews from critics and currently holds a 25% rating on Rotten Tomatoes based on 107 reviews.

Robert Koehler of Variety felt that the biopic, which contained "many standard-issue biopic montage sequences", was only "geared for the bigscreen, but the fairly bland visual design will make pic more than suitable to be seen on the tube". Koehler was critical of both performances, feeling that while Lopez brought "plenty of ferocity" to her character, there wasn't "shape" or "power" to her "wrath", and labeled Anthony "the dullest of movie drug addicts".

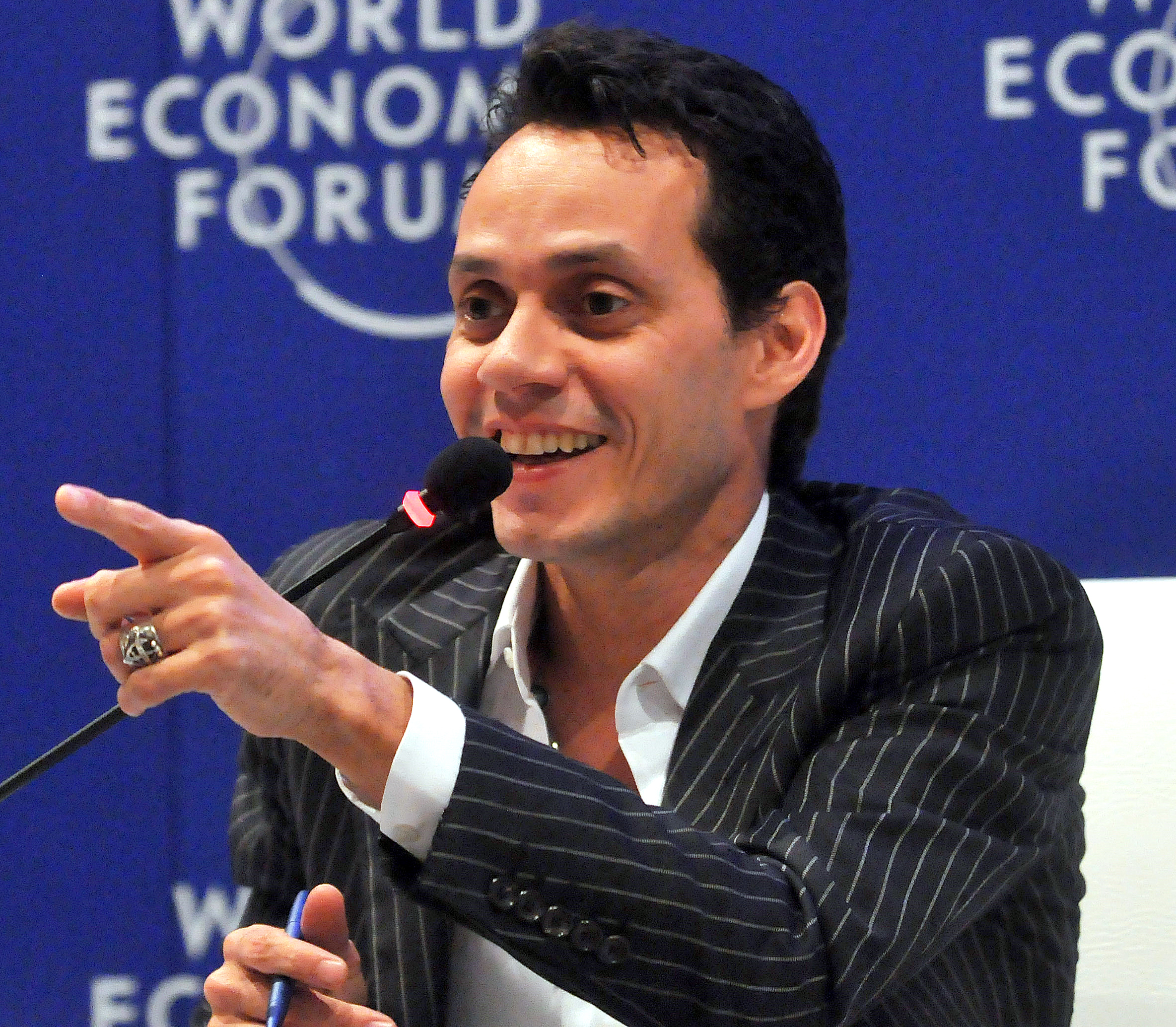
Marc Anthony's portrayal of Lavoe was met with a mixed reaction from film critics.

A. O. Scott of The New York Times felt that Anthony as Lavoe was hidden behind "his high, delicate cheekbones and tinted glasses" but "Whenever Héctor takes the stage, however, Mr. Anthony unleashes his charisma, and shows that, whatever his limitations as an actor, he is a brilliant performer". Scott praised Lopez's performance, noting that it had "a lot of fight" with "a hard, skeptical edge" that made Puchi "a more interesting and plausible character than her husband". Ed Gonzalez of Slant Magazine gave the film and Anthony's performance a positive review, but was critical of Lopez, calling her performance "predictably self-conscious" but said her sequences "complements Puchi's own". Renee Schonfield of Common Sense Media gave El Cantante a negative review, "brings the magic of salsa music to the screen; unfortunately, it also brings the audience another bleak story of a flameout singer bent on self-destruction".

Kevin Maher of The Times was negative, stating that the "soft-pedalled account of Lavoe's rise to fame and his drug-related downfall that has more in common with the biopic parody Walk Hard than anything as muddy as real life". Claudia Puig of USA Today said Anthony "gives a fine and impassioned performance" in a story that "relies on formula and clichés of the genre" which meant "we don't learn enough about what caused the Puerto Rican-born Lavoe's downward spiral into drug use, promiscuity and suicide attempts after he gained fame in New York City". Additionally, Puig criticized Lopez's airtime by stating "the film has far too much of her and not enough of Anthony".

Peter Bradshaw of The Guardian, in a review based primarily on Lopez, panned her performance and said "There is something entirely dead about Lopez's performance. No matter how superficially lively she makes it, she is always simply mouthing the lines". On the other hand, Charlotte O'Sullivan of the Evening Standard praised Lopez and her character, "Lopez deserves praise for pushing this project. The recently deceased Puchi (who helped generate the script and pushed for Lopez to play her) is not the kind of character you see on screen every day. She has not been whitewashed and neither, thank goodness, has her husband".

=== Criticism ===
The film was criticized, and accused of "usurping barrio culture and exploiting Lavoe's memory", with salsa singer Ismael Miranda condemning it for "focusing too much on the tragic artist's drug abuse, which eventually led to his death from AIDS complications". Other celebrities who criticized the film included singer Domingo Quiñones, and vocalist Cheo Feliciano. Willie Colón, Lavoe's long time friend and musical partner, was critical of the film. Although he had been hired as a consultant for El cantante, he was not pleased with the end result, stating:

"The creators of El Cantante missed an opportunity to do something of relevance for our community. The real story was about Hector fighting the obstacles of a nonsupportive industry that took advantage of entertainers with his charisma and talent. Instead they did another movie about two Puerto Rican junkies".

Additionally, Colón blamed Lopez and Anthony:

"It's difficult to comprehend how two individuals who are in the music business like Marc and Jennifer are not aware of the damage and the consequences of promoting only the negative side of our Latin music culture".

In addition, although the film was predominantly a love story, Colón also noted that in real life, he believed Puchi caused Lavoe's drug problems, but was canonized "so that Jennifer can play her". David L. Coddon of U-T San Diego said following the film's release, "Latino pop culture's highest-profile couple is taking heat from salsa purists who complain that the film, about salsa legend Hector Lavoe, is a distortion, even an exploitation", while also stating Lopez is "one of the most famous women in the world, and there's nothing her critics can do to change that".

NPR's Felix Contreras weighed in on the criticism, pointing out that "any time you have a portrayal of an artist where they reflect a history of drug abuse or alcohol abuse" there would always be criticism, and "in this case, some folks are arguing that the film was focusing on that drug abuse, and not necessarily on what he generated or what he contributed to the music". When commenting on the film, Lopez felt her performance should have earned an Oscar nomination, stating that the Academy of Motion Picture Arts and Sciences overlooked both the film and her performance.

=== Accolades ===
Award	Work	Result
Outstanding Performance of a Lead Latino / a Cast in a Motion Picture	El cantante	Nominated
Premios Juventud for Best Movie	El cantante	Nominated
Premios Juventud for Best Actress	Jennifer Lopez	Nominated
Latin Grammy Award for Best Salsa Album	Marc Anthony	Won
