= Willie Colón =

American musician (1950–2026)

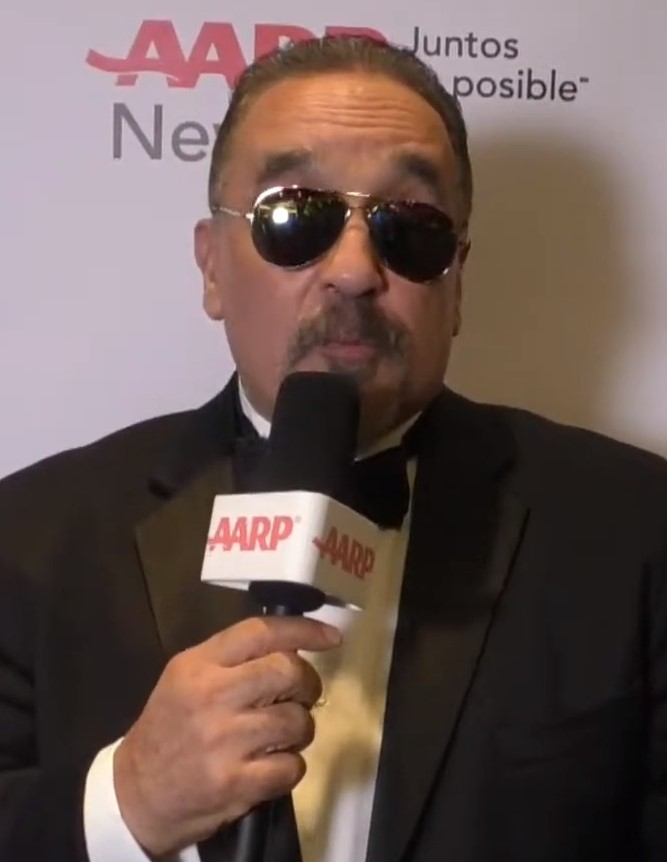
- Colón in 2017

Background information
- Also known as: el Malo del Bronx ("The Bad Boy from the Bronx") el Varón de la Salsa ("The Baron of Salsa")
- Born: William Anthony Colón Román; April 28, 1950; New York City, New York, U.S.
- Died: February 21, 2026 (aged 75) Bronxville, New York, U.S.
- Genres: Salsa; bolero; bomba; plena; boogaloo; merengue; zamba
- Occupations: Musician; producer; activist; arranger; musical director; composer; singer; actor
- Instruments: Vocals; trombone; bass trumpet
- Years active: 1967–2026
- Labels: Sonográfica; Fania
- Website: www.williecolon.com (in Spanish and English)

William Anthony Colón Román (April 28, 1950 – February 21, 2026) was an American salsa musician and social activist. He began his career as a trombonist but also sang, wrote, produced and acted. Colón was a pioneer of salsa music and a best-selling artist in the genre, having been a key figure in the beginnings of the New York City scene associated with Fania Records. He was also noteworthy for having assumed the gangster image in his album covers before it was culturally popular. From the 1980s on, he was at times deeply involved in the politics of New York City. His hit songs include "Aguanilé" with Hector Lavoe, "Tiburón", and "El gran varón".

== Early years ==
Colón was born on 139th street in Mott Haven, Bronx in New York City to Puerto Rican parents and grew up in same neighborhood. He picked up the trumpet from a young age, and later switched to trombone, inspired by the all-trombone sound of Mon Rivera and Barry Rogers. He spent some summers at his maternal grandmother's sister's farm in the outskirts of Manatí, Puerto Rico, on the road to neighboring Ciales, Puerto Rico.

At the age of 15, he was signed to Fania Records, and at 17, he recorded his first album, which ultimately sold more than 300,000 copies. The main record producer at Fania at the time, Johnny Pacheco, recommended Héctor Lavoe to him.

== Music career ==
Beyond the trombone, he also worked as a composer, arranger, and singer, and eventually as a producer and director. Combining elements of jazz, rock, and salsa, his work incorporates the rhythms of traditional music from African descendants in Cuba, the Dominican Republic, Puerto Rico, and Brazil, representing mostly a one-way flow from Puerto Rico to the New York-based diaspora. "His life and music commute back and forth between his home turf in the Bronx and his ancestral Puerto Rico, with more than casual stop-offs in other musical zones of the Caribbean." Colón "makes the relation between diaspora and Caribbean homeland the central theme of his work", particularly in his 1971 Christmas album, Asalto Navideño. The lyrics and music of the songs on this album "enact the diaspora addressing the island culture in a complex, loving but at the same time mildly challenging way".

He went on to have many successful collaborations with other salsa musicians and singers, such as Ismael Miranda, Celia Cruz, Soledad Bravo, and singer-songwriter Rubén Blades. On his website, it is claimed that Colón holds the "all time record for sales in the Salsa genre, [having] created 40 productions that have sold more than thirty million records worldwide".

One significant overarching theme in Colón's music, which draws from many cultures and several different styles, is an exploration of the competing associations that Puerto Ricans have with their home and with the United States. He used his songs to depict and investigate the problems of living in the United States mainland as a Puerto Rican, and also to imply the cultural contributions that Puerto Ricans have to offer.

In May 2007, Colón sued Rubén Blades for breach of contract. This led to a series of suits and countersuits that lasted over five years, resulting in decisions in Blades's favor.

Colón released two singles, "Amor de Internet" and "Corazón Partido", to promote for his album El Malo Vol II: Prisioneros del Mambo. In 2016, Colón began his 50th Anniversary Tour. In 2017, Colón announced his upcoming book titled Barrio de Guapos (The Secret Life of Willie Colón) and the launching of his record label Willie Colón Presenta. For 2018 Colón kicked off his "Rumba Del Siglo" (Jam of the Century) World Tour performing in U.S., Latin America and Europe to mostly sold-out venues. Because of the great success of his last tour, Colón will continue "Rumba Del Siglo 2019" (Jam of the Century 2019).

== Politics ==
Colón campaigned, and later became a special assistant and spokesperson for, New York City Mayor David Dinkins from 1989 to 1993.

In 1994, in his first political run, Colón challenged Representative Eliot Engel for the Democratic party primary for New York's 17th congressional district. He was defeated, 62% to 38%.

In 2001, Colón ran for New York City Public Advocate, receiving 101,393 votes.

Colón served for 12 years as Mayor Michael Bloomberg's representative advisor and liaison to the Latin Media Entertainment Commission.

On April 16, 2008, Colón announced his endorsement of U.S. Senator Hillary Clinton in her 2008 presidential campaign.

On April 25, 2010, Colón appeared at The National Mall for The Earth Day Climate Rally, along with Sting, John Legend, The Roots, Jimmy Cliff, Passion Pit, Bob Weir, Joss Stone, Robert Randolph, Patrick Stump, Mavis Staples, Booker T, Honor Society and Tao Rodríguez-Seeger.

In 2012 and 2013, Colón campaigned against Venezuelan president Hugo Chávez and the left-wing Bolivarian Revolution. Chávez responded scathingly to Colón via Twitter. After Chávez's death, Willie Colón endorsed opposition candidate Henrique Capriles Radonski, vigorously using social media and composing a campaign theme, "Mentira Fresca" (or "fresh lies", which became the nickname of regime's candidate, Nicolás Maduro); the song went viral throughout Latin America, garnering millions of plays and downloads. Colón continued to be active in Venezuelan politics, having pressed for the release of journalist Leocenis García, and the release of political prisoner General Antonio Rivero.

In the 2010s, Colón became increasingly right-wing in his politics, a marked contrast to the music he wrote during his musical career. He became very active on Twitter, frequently sharing right-wing memes and graphics.

== Other activities ==
Colón was a civil rights, community, and political activist from the age of 16. He served as a member of the Latino Commission on AIDS, president of the Arthur Schomburg Coalition for a Better New York, and member of the board of directors of the Congressional Hispanic Caucus Institute. In 1995, Colón became the first person of color to serve on the American Society of Composers, Authors and Publishers (ASCAP) national board, replacing Stephen Sondheim, and was also a member of the ASCAP Foundation.

He also acted in films, including roles in Vigilante (1983), The Last Fight (1983), Miami Vice (in the season 3 episode "Cuba Libre") (1987), and It Could Happen to You (1994).

== Personal life and death ==
On May 26, 2014, after graduating from Westchester County Police Academy, Colón was sworn in as a Deputy Sheriff for the Department of Public Safety. On December 13, 2017, Colón became a Deputy Lieutenant.

On April 20, 2021, Colón and his wife, Julia Colón, were involved in a serious vehicle collision while driving a recreational vehicle through the Outer Banks of North Carolina. Colón suffered lacerations and a head injury and was evacuated to a hospital in Virginia.

On Saturday, February 21, 2026, Colón died at New York-Presbyterian Westchester Hospital, in Bronxville, New York, at the age of 75, after emergency hospitalization for breathing problems due to interstitial lung disease.

== Awards and honors ==
In addition to serving as a visiting professor and receiving honorary degrees for music and humane letters at various universities, in 1991, Colón received Yale University's Chubb Fellowship. In 1999, Colón was a member of the Jubilee 2000 delegation to the Vatican, along with Randall Robinson of Trans Africa, Harvard economist Jeffrey Sachs, Bono from U2 and Quincy Jones. This initiative received Pope John Paul II's endorsement and later prompted President Clinton to forgive the US portion of the debt owed by some developing countries. Jubilee 2000 resulted in the forgiveness of a total of $100 billion to debt-ridden countries.

In September 2004, Colón received the Lifetime Achievement Award from The Latin Recording Academy. Over the course of his career, he collaborated with notable musicians such as the Fania All-Stars, Héctor Lavoe, Rubén Blades, David Byrne, and Celia Cruz. Siembra, his record with Rubén Blades, was the best selling album for its genre. Colón was inducted into the International Latin Music Hall of Fame in 2000 and the Latin Songwriters Hall of Fame in 2019.

In 2006, Colón was portrayed by actor John Ortiz, along with Marc Anthony's Héctor Lavoe in the biopic El Cantante, also starring Jennifer Lopez. The movie is about the life of Héctor Lavoe and it covers his achievements with Colón as the top salsa duo from the 1960s through the mid-1970s.

In 2010, The "International Trombone Association" bestowed their Lifetime Achievement Award upon Colón. In their journal they went on to say, "Willie Colón has probably done more than anyone since Tommy Dorsey to keep the trombone before the public. Stylistically they are poles apart, Dorsey representing an ultra-smooth approach, Colón a Hard-edged roughness reportedly inspired by Barry Rogers. Unfortunately, Colón's public is largely Latino, so his music and contribution have gone unnoticed or ignored by the general press"- Gerald Sloan, professor of music University of Arkansas. On October 7, 2011, Westchester Hispanic Law Enforcement Association recognized Colón for his social and community activism and support.

In 2015 Billboard magazine named Willie Colón one of the 30 most influential Latin Artists of All Time.

On May 12, 2018, The Ellis Island Honor Society awarded Willie Colón the Ellis Island Medal of Honor which is presented annually to a select group of individuals whose accomplishments in their field and inspired service to the nation are cause for celebration. The Medal has been officially recognized by both Houses of Congress as one of our nation's most prestigious awards and is annually memorialized in the Congressional Record.

On October 31, 2018, Willie Colón was awarded the "Lunas Del Auditorio Award" by El Auditorio Nacional. A recognition granted by the National Auditorium to the best live shows in Mexico, the award is a replica of the sculpture of La Luna by sculptor Juan Soriano that is outside that enclosure. This award is transmitted by Televisa, TV Azteca, Channel 22 of the Ministry of Culture and Channel Eleven of the National Polytechnic Institute.

Colón served as the chair of the Association of Hispanic Arts.

== Discography ==
Title	Producer	Label	Released
El Malo	Jerry Masucci; Johnny Pacheco	Fania	1967
The Hustler	Jerry Masucci; Johnny Pacheco	Fania	1968
Guisando	Willie Colón	Fania	1969
Cosa Nuestra	Willie Colón	Fania	1970
Asalto Navideño	Willie Colón	Fania	1971
La Gran Fuga	Willie Colón	Fania	1971
El Juicio	Willie Colón	Fania	1972
Asalto Navideño Vol. ll	Willie Colón	Fania	1972
Crime Pays	Willie Colón	Fania	1972
Lo Mato	Willie Colón	Fania	1973
Willie	Willie Colón	Fania	1974
Se Chavó el Vecindario (with Mon Rivera)	Willie Colón	Vaya	1975
The Good, The Bad, The Ugly	Willie Colón	Fania	1975
Metiendo Mano!	Willie Colón	Fania	1977
El Baquiné de Angelitos Negros	Willie Colón	Fania	1977
Sólo Ellos Pudieron Hacer Este Álbum	Willie Colón	Fania	1977
49 Minutes	Willie Colón	Fania	1978
Deja Vu	Willie Colón	Fania	1978
Siembra	Willie Colón; Ruben Blades	Fania	1978
Solo	Willie Colón	Fania	1979
Doble Energía	Willie Colón	Fania	1980
Canciones del Solar de los Aburridos	Willie Colón	Fania	1981
Celia & Willie	Willie Colón	Fania	1981
Fantasmas	Willie Colón	Fania	1981
Corazón Guerrero	Willie Colón	Fania	1982
The Last Fight	Willie Colón	Fania	1982
Su Vida Musical: 14 Éxitos Originales		Fania	1982
Vigilante	Willie Colón	Fania	1983
Criollo	Willie Colón	RCA	1984
Tiempo Pa' Matar	Willie Colón	Fania	1984
Contrabando Especial N°5	Willie Colón	Sonográfica	1986
Quién Eres	Willie Colón		1986
Grandes Éxitos			1986
The Winners	Willie Colón	Fania	1987
Top Secrets	Willie Colón	Fania	1989
Color Americano	Willie Colón	Sony	1990
Grandes Éxitos Vol. 2		Sony	1991
Honra y Cultura	Willie Colón	Sony	1991
Super Éxitos		Fania	1992
The Best		Fania	1992
Willie Colón & Tito Puente		Fania	1993
Hecho en Puerto Rico	Willie Colón, Cuco Peña	Sony	1993
The Best II		Sony	1994
Americano Latino	Willie Colón	Sony	1995
Tras La Tormenta	Willie Colón, Rubén Blades	Sony	1995
Y Vuelve Otra Vez!!!	Willie Colón	Fonovisa	1996
Demasiado Corazón	Willie Colón	Azteca	1998
El Rey del Trombón			1998
Mi Gran Amor		Sony	1999
Guerrero de Corazón			2000
Idilio		Sony	2002
La Experiencia		Fania	2004
Colección de Oro			2005
OG: Original Gangster		Emusica	2006
The Player		Sony	2007
La Historia: The Hit List			2007
El Malo Vol II: Prisioneros del Mambo	Willie Colón	Lone Wolf	2008
Asalto Navideño Live/En Vivo		Lone Wolf	2008
La Esencia de la Fania			2008
Historia de la Salsa			2010
Selecciones Fania		Vene Music	2011
Serie Premium: Sólo Éxitos			2013

== See also ==
- Guaguancó
- Son cubano
- Salsa
- Afro-Cuban jazz
- List of Puerto Ricans
- Nuyorican
- Music of New York
