= List of unsolved historical mysteries and proposed explanations =

List of unresolved historical questions

This list of unsolved historical mysteries covers disputed identities, disappearances, unexplained deaths and events, undeciphered writing, and questions about the whereabouts or purpose of historical objects and places. Entries are limited to documented people, events, texts and objects for which reliable secondary sources identify an unresolved historical question. Each entry specifies the unresolved aspect and summarises proposed explanations and the evidence cited for them. Dates refer to the relevant events or the period in which a text, object or group is attested.

== Undeciphered scripts and texts ==
Case	Period and location	Unresolved question	Proposed explanations and evidence
Indus script	c. 2600–1900 BCE (mature phase); South Asia	Interpretation of the inscriptions and their relationship to spoken language.	Asko Parpola and Iravatham Mahadevan have supported a Dravidian interpretation. Parpola uses the rebus principle to relate signs to words with similar sounds. Steve Farmer, Richard Sproat and Michael Witzel have instead argued that the signs were nonlinguistic symbols. No generally accepted decipherment has emerged.
Cretan hieroglyphs	18th–17th centuries BCE; Crete and the Aegean	The language and phonetic values of a writing system found on seals and administrative documents.	The script combines signs for syllables and words. Maurizio Del Freo considers it probably a local Cretan development. Similarities with Linear A suggest exchanges in accounting practices, but the relationship between the scripts and the language of the inscriptions remain unresolved.
Linear A	c. 1800–1450 BCE; Crete and the Aegean	The language and reading of a script used principally for administrative records.	Proposals have linked the language to Anatolian languages, Semitic languages and Etruscan. In a review of these approaches, Ester Salgarella argues that vocabulary comparisons alone are insufficient without grammatical evidence, and that no proposed affiliation has established a decisive advantage.
Phaistos Disc	Second millennium BCE; Crete	The meaning and linguistic affiliation of the stamped inscription.	The number of distinct signs suggests a syllabic script. Proposed readings include religious texts and calendars. Maurizio Del Freo notes that the absence of comparable inscriptions prevents verification of the proposed decipherments; similarities with other Cretan scripts have not established a definite relationship.
Voynich manuscript	15th century; held at Yale University	The meaning of an illustrated manuscript written in an unidentified script.	Claire Bowern and Luke Lindemann argue that its statistical properties support an underlying natural language rather than a medieval hoax. Their analysis identifies structural patterns but does not provide a translation. The text remains undeciphered.
Rongorongo	Recorded in the 19th century; Rapa Nui	The meaning and origin of signs carved on wooden objects.	Interpretations include language-based writing and mnemonic notation. Research led by Silvia Ferrara dated the wood of one tablet to before European contact, supporting the possibility of independent invention. Because older wood could have been carved later, the result does not directly date the inscription. No generally accepted decipherment exists.

== Unidentified peoples and individuals ==
Case	Period and location	Unresolved question	Proposed explanations and evidence
Sea Peoples	13th–12th centuries BCE; Eastern Mediterranean	The origins and identities of several groups named in Egyptian records.	Christoph Bachhuber reviews proposed connections with the Aegean and Anatolia, based on names and archaeological evidence. He also notes difficulties in reconstructing their movements from politically shaped Egyptian accounts. The groups appear individually and in different combinations; the collective designation does not identify a single people.
Princes in the Tower	1483; England	The fate of Edward V and Richard of Shrewsbury, Duke of York, who disappeared while held in the Tower of London.	Historic Royal Palaces describes murder in 1483 as a widely held interpretation and Richard III as the longstanding principal suspect. Other proposals implicate figures such as Henry Stafford. The circumstances of the princes' deaths and responsibility for them remain disputed.
Man in the Iron Mask	Imprisonment from 1669; France and Pinerolo	The prisoner's identity and the reason for the secrecy surrounding his detention.	Earlier identifications included Ercole Antonio Mattioli and Nicolas Fouquet. Many modern interpretations identify the prisoner as Eustache Daughter, although his background remains uncertain. Paul Sonnino links Daughter's detention to knowledge of Cardinal Mazarin's financial affairs; David Parrott regards the reconstruction as plausible but notes that an important proposed employment relationship is inferred rather than directly documented.
Kaspar Hauser	1828–1833; Germany	His parentage and early life before his appearance in Nuremberg.	A longstanding proposal identified Hauser as a kidnapped prince of the House of Baden. A 2024 study found that mitochondrial DNA from samples attributed to him did not match the relevant Baden maternal lineage, excluding that identification. The findings did not establish his actual ancestry.
Jack the Ripper	1888; London	The identity of the murderer associated with the Whitechapel killings, and which murders should be attributed to the same person.	The killer's identity remains unknown. Contemporary police inquiries investigated several suspects but resulted in no charges. Later writers have proposed numerous identifications, none of which has conclusively established the murderer.
Hinterkaifeck murders	1922; Bavaria, Germany	The identity and motive of the killer or killers of six people at a farm.	Investigators considered robbery, while later interpretations have proposed personal or family motives. Author Peter Leuschner argues against robbery because money and jewellery were left behind. Neither a motive nor the identity of the perpetrator has been established.
Zodiac Killer	1968–1969 (confirmed attacks); northern California	The killer's identity.	Numerous suspects have been proposed, but no identification has been established by the authorities. No one has been charged with the murders.

== Disappearances ==
Case	Period and location	Unresolved question	Proposed explanations and evidence
Fate of the Ninth Legion	2nd century CE; Roman Empire	When, where and how the Roman legion ceased to exist.	Proposals include destruction in Britain or transfer elsewhere before its loss in a later conflict. Evidence from Nijmegen and the careers of officers has been used to argue for survival beyond its last British attestations. The date and circumstances of the legion's end remain disputed.
Roanoke Colony	1587–1590; present-day North Carolina	The fate of the English colonists whose settlement was found abandoned by John White.	The National Park Service describes relocation to Croatoan, now Hatteras Island, as a compelling explanation. Other proposals place settlers inland along Albemarle Sound or near Chesapeake Bay. English artefacts at proposed sites could reflect trade, and have not established the fate of the entire group.
Franklin's lost expedition	From 1845; Canadian Arctic	The expedition's final movements and the factors that caused the deaths of its members.	Starvation and disease have been proposed as contributing factors. A 2018 analysis of skeletal remains did not support lead poisoning as a pivotal cause of the disaster. The wrecks of HMS Erebus and HMS Terror were found in 2014 and 2016; uncertainty concerns the final course of events, rather than the ships' locations.
Mary Celeste	1872; Atlantic Ocean	Why the ship was abandoned and what happened to its ten occupants.	Anne MacGregor and oceanographer Phil Richardson suggested that rough weather and difficulty assessing water in the hold caused Captain Benjamin Briggs to fear that the vessel was sinking. Another hypothesis concerns danger from alcohol vapour in the cargo. The ship remained seaworthy when recovered, and the occupants' fate is unknown.
Flannan Isles lighthouse keepers	December 1900; Outer Hebrides, Scotland	The circumstances in which James Ducat, Thomas Marshall and Donald McArthur disappeared.	The official inquiry concluded that an unexpectedly large wave probably swept the men into the sea while they were near the western landing, possibly securing equipment. Damage around the landing supported this interpretation, but the precise sequence of events was not established.
Waratah	July 1909; off South Africa	The cause and location of the passenger steamer's loss.	Explanations have focused on stability concerns and severe weather. A 2025 study by D. J. Pons reconstructed the ship's route and proposed that it encountered a rogue wave near the continental shelf off Algoa Bay. The reconstruction identifies possible search areas; the wreck has not been located.
Disappearance of Ambrose Bierce	From 1913; United States and Mexico	The writer's fate after his departure on a journey towards Mexico.	Proposals include death during the Mexican Revolution, suicide, and illness while returning towards the United States. Accounts of his final movements and supposed burial places have not established where or how he died.
USS Cyclops	March 1918; western Atlantic	The cause and location of the naval collier's disappearance.	Naval historian Samuel J. Cox considers catastrophic structural failure the most likely explanation. The ship's heavy ore cargo and the later losses of two sister ships carrying ore support concern about structural vulnerability. No wreck has been identified to confirm the mechanism of loss.
Percy Fawcett expedition	1925; Brazil	The fate of Percy Fawcett, his son Jack and Raleigh Rimell.	Proposals include violence, illness and travel hazards. David Grann recorded a Kalapalo oral history in which the party continued despite warnings and was subsequently believed to have been killed. The account describes an inference from the men's failure to return, rather than an eyewitness account of their deaths.
Amelia Earhart and Fred Noonan	2 July 1937; central Pacific	The location and circumstances of their disappearance during a flight to Howland Island.	The National Air and Space Museum considers failure to locate Howland, followed by fuel exhaustion and ditching in the Pacific, the explanation most consistent with the known circumstances. This interpretation has not established the aircraft's precise location or the details of the occupants' deaths.
Disappearance of Raoul Wallenberg	From January 1945; Hungary and the Soviet Union	The date and circumstances of the Swedish diplomat's death after his arrest by Soviet forces.	Soviet authorities reported that Wallenberg died in Lubyanka prison in 1947. Reports that he survived beyond that date have complicated the account. The Swedish government states that the circumstances of his imprisonment and death have never been fully established.
D. B. Cooper	24 November 1971; northwestern United States	The identity and fate of the hijacker who parachuted from Northwest Orient Airlines Flight 305.	The Federal Bureau of Investigation considers death during the jump a possible explanation, citing unsuitable equipment and clothing, darkness and difficult terrain. Some ransom money was recovered in 1980, but neither the hijacker's identity nor his fate has been confirmed.

== Deaths and unexplained events ==
Case	Period and location	Unresolved question	Proposed explanations and evidence
Death of Alexander the Great	323 BCE; Babylon	The cause of Alexander's fatal illness.	Medical reviews have considered malaria, typhoid fever and poisoning. Burke A. Cunha favours typhoid fever on the basis of the reported symptoms. Leo J. Schep and colleagues identify white hellebore as a plausible agent if poisoning occurred, without establishing that Alexander was poisoned. The competing diagnoses depend on divergent ancient accounts.
Dancing plague of 1518	1518; Strasbourg	The cause of an outbreak of prolonged, apparently involuntary dancing.	Historian John C. Waller interprets the outbreak as a mass psychogenic illness associated with hardship and contemporary religious beliefs. He argues that ergot poisoning does not adequately explain the sustained dancing described in historical accounts.
Death of Edgar Allan Poe	1849; Baltimore	The cause of the writer's death and the circumstances of his final days.	Proposals include illness, alcohol-related complications and cooping, in which victims were coerced into voting repeatedly. Poe Museum curator Chris Semtner considers a combination of factors possible and cautions that no single explanation accounts for all the circumstances.
Death of Ludwig II of Bavaria	13 June 1886; Lake Starnberg, Bavaria	How Ludwig and his physician Bernhard von Gudden died during an evening walk.	Proposals include suicide following a struggle with Gudden, a fatal collapse during an attempted escape, and homicide. The Haus der Bayerischen Geschichte describes conflicting testimony and inconclusive evidence as obstacles to establishing the sequence of events.

== Sites and objects ==
Case	Period and location	Unresolved question	Proposed explanations and evidence
Land of Punt	c. 2500–1170 BCE (Egyptian trade); Red Sea region	The location and geographical extent of the trading region described in Egyptian sources.	Proposed locations include parts of northeastern Africa and southern Arabia. A 2020 study of mummified baboons identified origins in a region encompassing parts of Ethiopia, Eritrea, Djibouti, Somalia and Yemen. The results support a southern Red Sea connection but do not identify a single settlement or precise territorial boundaries.
Tomb of Alexander the Great	After 323 BCE; Egypt	The location and later fate of Alexander's tomb in Alexandria.	Egyptologist Robert S. Bianchi locates the search within the ancient city's central area using literary accounts. He suggests that damage or looting during disturbances in the late third century CE may explain the tomb's disappearance from the historical record. No surviving tomb has been conclusively identified.
Tomb of Antony and Cleopatra	After 30 BCE; Egypt	The location of the burial place of Cleopatra and Mark Antony.	Historian Jane Draycott and underwater archaeologist Franck Goddio favour a location in ancient Alexandria, consistent with literary accounts. Kathleen Martínez has investigated Taposiris Magna as an alternative. Discoveries there have not established a connection with the royal burial, and the tomb remains unidentified.
Roman dodecahedra	Roman imperial period; Europe	The function of hollow, twelve-sided metal objects with openings in their faces.	Proposed functions include measuring devices, candleholders and objects used in divination. Variation in their dimensions has been cited against measuring functions. The excavation group responsible for the Norton Disney example favours a ritual interpretation, but its precise function remains unknown.
Tomb of Genghis Khan	After 1227; Mongolia	The location of Genghis Khan's burial.	Burkhan Khaldun, in the Khentii Mountains, is traditionally associated with the burial and is described by UNESCO as his reputed burial site. This association has not established the location of an identifiable grave.
Amber Room	1941–1945; Königsberg	The fate of decorative panels removed from the Catherine Palace by German forces.	In a 2018 historical survey, Russell Shor reports that most historians favour destruction during bombing or fighting at Königsberg. Searches based on evacuation or concealment have not produced a substantiated recovery. The room displayed in the Catherine Palace is a reconstruction completed in 2003.

== See also ==
- Undeciphered writing systems
- List of missing treasures
- List of unsolved deaths
