= Melliangee Pérez =

Puerto Rican soprano

- Born: Melliangee Pérez-Maldonado; 21 June 1976 (age 50); Ponce, Puerto Rico
- Origin: Puerto Rican
- Genres: Opera, zarzuela, operetta, musical theater, art song, popular music
- Occupations: Singer, actress, musician
- Instrument: Voice

Melliangee Pérez-Maldonado (born ca. 21 June 1976) is a Puerto Rican lyric soprano singer of classical music and opera as well as other music genres.

== Early years ==
Pérez was born in Ponce, Puerto Rico. She graduated from Dr. Pila High School in Ponce in 1994. She studied at the Conservatory of Music of Puerto Rico as well as studying voice under Zoraida Lopez and Justino Díaz.

== Career ==
Pérez has represented Puerto Rico at various festivals in Europe. She has performed with all the opera companies in the Island as well as performing in Europe, the United States, Central America, and the Caribbean. In August 2010, she was soprano soloist at the performance of Beethoven's Ninth Symphony with the Orquesta Sinfónica Nacional in Santo Domingo, Dominican Republic and made her debut at the Teatro Nacional Eduardo Brito under the musical direction José Antonio Molina.

== Repertoire ==
Pérez's opera roles include Donna Anna (Don Giovanni), Mimi (La bohème), Contessa Almaviva (Le nozze di Figaro), Micaela (Carmen), Elvira (Macías), Lauretta and Nella (Gianni Schicchi), Suzel (L'amico Fritz), Princess Patricia (El espejo de la reina), Isabelle / Madeline (The Face on the Barroom Floor), Little Red Riding Hood (La caperucita roja), Euridice (Orfeo ed Euridice), among others. In the zarzuela genre, her roles include Cecilia Valdés (Cecilia Valdés), Santa (Alma Llanera), Constance (El huésped del sevillano), and Aurora (Las leandras). She has also participated in several zarzuela anthologies: Entre claveles y faroles, Antología de Zarzuela en el Chotis, Viva Madrid and Zarzuelada. She made her debut as a soloist with the Orquesta Sinfónica de Puerto Rico in a concert entitled Music of Broadway, conducted by Roselin Pabón, who is also the general manager of the Arturo Somohano Philharmonic Orchestra of Puerto Rico.

== Humanitarian works and initiatives ==
In 2009 Pérez collaborated with Cuarzo Blanco and others in a special project named "Leamos todos juntos" (Let's Read All Together), to encourage children to read in Puerto Rico as part of UNESCO's World Book Day.

== Awards ==
1994

Resolution in the Puerto Rico Senate (1994) highlighting her accomplishments and talent in opera.

1999

- Metropolitan Opera National Council Auditions (District of Puerto Rico)

2003

- Metropolitan Opera National Council Auditions (District of Puerto Rico)
- Resolution in the Puerto Rico House of Representatives (2003) highlighting her accomplishments and talent in opera.

2004

- Metropolitan Opera National Council Auditions (District of Puerto Rico)

2005

- Semi-finalist at the International Francisco Viñas Competition in Barcelona

2008

- Semi-finalist at the International Francisco Viñas Competition in Barcelona
- Soprano of the Year award by UNESCO

2009

- "Honorary Member" of the Banda Municipal de Ponce Juan Morel Campos with which she has recorded a DVD celebrating the 125th anniversary of its founding.

== See also ==
- List of Puerto Ricans
- History of women in Puerto Rico
- List of People from Ponce, Puerto Rico
