= Manuel Rueda (writer) =

Dominican pianist, author and music educator (1921–1999)

- Born: August 27, 1921; Monte Cristi, Dominican Republic
- Died: December 20, 1999 (aged 78); Santo Domingo, Dominican Republic
- Occupations: Writer and poet

Manuel Antonio Rueda González (27 August 1921 – 20 December 1999) was a Dominican writer and pianist. He served as Director of the National Conservatory of Music for 20 years. Rueda was a recipient of the Order of Merit of Duarte, Sánchez and Mella.

== Early life and education ==
Rueda was born in Monte Cristi Province in the Dominican Republic on 27 August 1921.

Rueda studied at the Liceo Musical at María Luisa Nanita and Oliva Pichardo De Marchena and was later a student of Manuela Jiménez. He continued his education at Rosita Renard's Conservatory in Santiago de Chile after having obtained a scholarship. Together with Armando Palacios Bate, undertook a concert tour through South America, after which he finished with the Premio Orrego Carvallo excellent.

== Career ==
When he returned to the Dominican Republic after fourteen years, he became director of the Liceo Musical Pablo Claudio in San Cristóbal and later became a piano professor at the Conservatorio de Santo Domingo.

In May 1952, Rueda and Aida Bonnelly played a two-piano performance at the National Symphony Orchestra, one of Bach and the other of Mozart. In 1955, he represented the Dominican Republic at Miami's inaugural Spring Festival. At the Inter-American Music Festival (Interamericano de Música Festival) in 1972, he played George Gershwin Piano Concerto in F with the National Symphony Orchestra. In 1989, Rueda's adaptation of Shakespeare's Midsummer's Night Dream set in Santa Domingo was performed at New York City's Latin Festival.

In 1959, Rueda was named Director of the National Conservatory of Music, a role in which he would serve for over 20 years. He had previously been in charge of the conservatory's Curso Superior de Piano. In 1970, he became a member of the Dominican Academy of Letters.

Rueda was also a member of the Instituto de Investigaciones folklóricas of the Universidad Nacional Pedro Henríquez Ureña. In 1974, he founded the avant-garde literary movement of pluralism (philosophy) alongside Miguel Vila Luna, who expanded it in architectonics. He was a member of the Faculty of Musical Sciences and Arts (Facultad de Ciencias y Artes Musicales) of the University of Chile, and was a recipient of the Order of Merit of Duarte, Sánchez and Mella. Rueda won the annual National Literature Awards (Premio Annual de Literatura) six times and, in 1995, he won the Premio Teatral Tirso de Molina.

Rueda's pupils included Margarita Luna de Espaillat.

== Death ==
Rueda died on 20 December 1999 in Santo Domingo. He was 78.

== Works ==
- Las noches, poems, 1949, 1953
- Tríptico, poems, 1949
- La trinitaria blanca, Drama, 1957
- La criatura terrestre, poems, 1963
- Teatro, Drama, 1968
- Adivinanzas dominicanas, eds, 1968
- Conocimiento y poesía en el folklore, Essays, 1971
- Antología panorámica de la poesía dominicana 1912-1962, edited by Lupo Hernández Rueda, 1972
- Por los mares de la dama, poems, 1976
- Las edades del viento, poems, 1979
- El Rey Clinejas, Drama, 1979
- Papeles de Sara y otros relatos, narrations, 1985
- De Tierra morena vengo (with Ramón Francisco, the photographer Wilfredo García and the painter Ramón Oviedo)
- Congregación del cuerpo único, poems, 1989
- Retablo de la pasión y muerte de Juana la Loca, Drama, 1996
- Bienvenida y la noche, novel, 1995
- Dos siglos de literatura dominicana (see XIX y XX). Poesía y prosa, edited by José Alcántara Almánzar, 1996
- Las metamorfosis de Makandal, 1998

== Bibliography ==
- El Tren de Yaguaramas - Manuel Rueda (dead link)
- Isla Ternura - Manuel Rueda
- Poetas Dominicanos: Manuel Rueda (1921-1999)
- Escritores Dominicanos: Manuel Rueda
