= Abusir (Lake Mariout) =

Abusir أبو صير
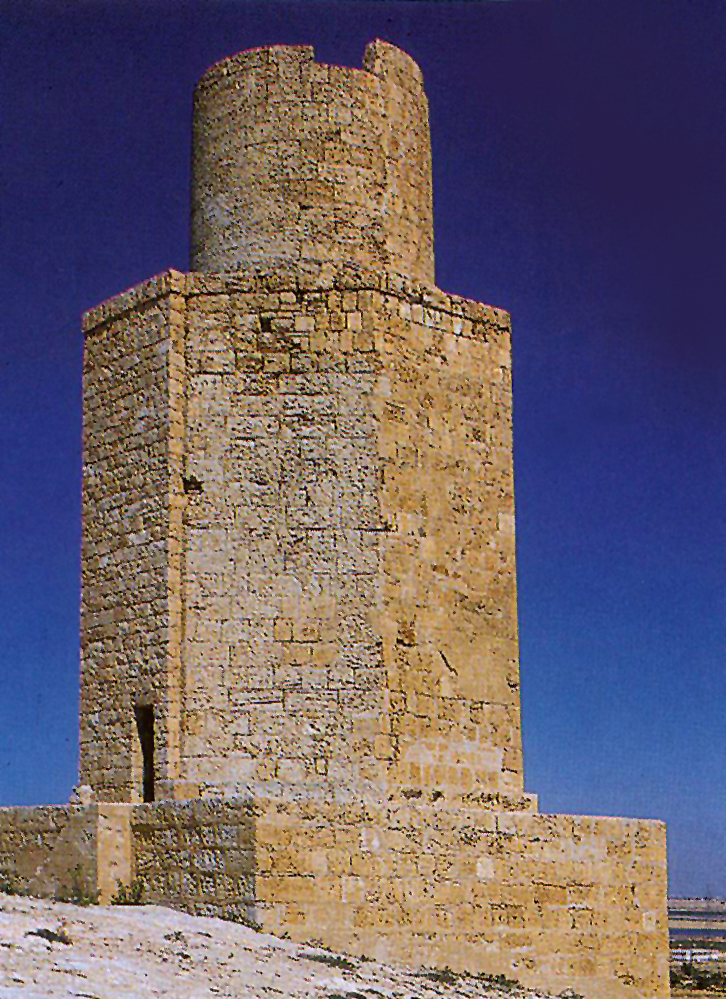
- The Pharos of Abusir, a likely copy of the famed lighthouse of Alexandria, adorns an ancient tomb.

- Location in Egypt
- Coordinates: 30°56′N 29°30′E
- Country: Egypt
- Governorate: Alexandria Governorate
- Named after: Osiris

Abusir (Arabic: أبو صير, Coptic: ⲡⲟⲩⲥⲓⲣⲓ) (also spelled Abousir and Abu Seer, known in ancient times as Taposiris Magna, Greek: Ταπόσιρις Μαγνὰ) is a seaside town on the shore of Lake Mariout on the western extremity of Egypt's Nile Delta. It is situated about 48 kilometres (30 mi) southwest of Alexandria. Ruins of an ancient temple and an ancient replica of the Lighthouse of Alexandria are to be seen here. As of 2009, it was also suspected to be the burial place of Cleopatra VII and Mark Antony.

== Ancient relics ==
A series of tombs and the remains of a temple are found on a stony kurkar ridge, wedged between the lake and the sea.

=== Ancient tomb ===
A well-preserved ancient tomb is thought to be a scaled-down model of the Alexandria Pharos. Known colloquially under various names — the Pharos of Abusir, the Abusir funerary monument and Burg al-Arab (Arab's Tower) — it consists of a 3-storey tower, approximately 20 metres (66 ft) in height, with a square base, a hexagonal midsection and cylindrical upper section, like the building upon which it was apparently modelled. It dates to the reign of Ptolemy II (285–246 BC), and is therefore likely to have been built at about the same time as the Alexandria Pharos. 30°56′53″N 29°31′24″E

== 21st-century excavations ==
Zahi Hawass and Kathleen Martinez have excavated the vicinity of the Temple of Isis since 2006. They found a carved male head and a partial mask, showing cleft chin reminiscent of Mark Antony, besides a stash of coins bearing the image of Cleopatra VII. Relying on these and the account of Plutarch, they believed that Cleopatra and Mark Antony were both buried in the vicinity, most likely below the Temple of Isis.

== See also ==
- Abu Qir (ancient Canopus), similarly named, but east of Alexandria
- Busiris of the central delta, likewise dedicated to Isis
