= El Ultimo Adios (The Last Goodbye) =

2001 charity single by various artists

"El último adiós (The Last Goodbye)"

Single by various artists
- Released: September 20, 2001
- Recorded: 2001
- Studio: The Hit Factory, Miami, Florida
- Genre: Latin pop
- Label: Epic; Sony Music
- Songwriters: Gian Marco; Emilio Estefan
- Producers: Gian Marco; Emilio Estefan; José Antonio Molina

"El último adiós" (English: "The Last Goodbye") is a song written by Peruvian singer Gian Marco and Cuban American musician and producer Emílio Estefan to commemorate the September 11 attacks and support the families of the victims. Proceeds of the recording went to the American Red Cross and the United Way. This version of the song was released both as a stand-alone single, and as part of a four-song special EP by the same name. Gian Marco also recorded a solo version of the song, which was considered one of his standout pieces during his international debut.

In the four minutes of the song, a variety of musical genres can be heard, and over 120 different artists were involved in the project, including Ricky Martin, Christina Aguilera, Jennifer Lopez, Shakira, Paulina Rubio, Thalía, Chayanne, Alejandro Sanz, José José, Ivete Sangalo, Luis Fonsi, Ana Bárbara, Juan Luis Guerra and Gloria Estefan.

== Personnel ==
Composers/producers

- Gian Marco
- Emilio Estefan

Soloists (in order of appearance)

- Ricky Martin
- Alejandro Sanz
- Thalía
- Juan Luis Guerra & Gloria Estefan
- Celia Cruz
- Juan Luis Guerra, Gloria Estefan & Olga Tañón
- Ricardo Montaner
- Ana Gabriel
- Jorge Hernández/Los Tigres del Norte & Alicia Villarreal / Grupo Límite
- Alejandro Fernández
- Carlos Vives
- Jaci Velasquez
- José Luis Rodríguez "El Puma"
- Marco Antonio Solís
- José José & Lucía Méndez
- Jennifer Lopez
- Emmanuel
- Chayanne
- Elvis Crespo, Gisselle Ortíz Cáceres & Gilberto Santa Rosa
- Paulina Rubio
- Beto Cuevas / La Ley
- Ana Bárbara
- Carlos Ponce
- Jon Secada
- Shakira
- Gian Marco
- Luis Fonsi
- Yuri & Miguel Bosé
- Wilkins, Gisselle Ortíz Cáceres Melina León & Ramiro / Limi-T 21
- Todos Unidos, Christina Aguilera Ad Libs
- José Feliciano & Alejandro Sanz
- José Feliciano

Chorus

Conducted by Timothy Sharp

- A.B. Quintanilla
- Alberto "Beto" Zapata
- Álvaro Torres
- Charlie Zaa
- Ednita Nazario
- Elvis Crespo
- Emilio Regueira
- Franco De Vita
- Ivete Sangalo
- Kumbia Kings
- Luis Conte
- Luis Enrique
- MDO
- Marcos Llunas
- Mauricio Claveria
- Nestor Torres
- Nicolas Tovar
- OV7
- Patricia Manterola
- Pilar Montenegro
- Rey Ruiz
- Ricky Muñoz
- Shalim
- Soraya
- Tito Puente
- Tommy Torres

Instrumentalists

Arranged and Conducted by José Antonio Molina

- Concertmaster – Alfredo Oliva
- Violin – Bogumila Zgraja, Bruce Wethey, Carole Cole, Carole Simmons, Dale Sandvold, Denise Stillwell, Gennady Aronin, Gustavo Correa*, Huifang Chen, John DiPuccio, Mariana Carreras, Mei Mei Luo, Rafael Elvira, Rochelle Skolnick, Sania Derevianko, Scott Flavin, Tony Huang
- Viola – David Chappell, Debra Spring, Karen Hebermehl, Richard Fleischman, Scott O'Donell, Tim Barnes, Xi Yang
- Cello – Chris Glansdorp, Claudio Jaffe, David Cole, Philip Lakofsky, Ross T. Harbaugh
- Double Bass – Geoffrey Bowater
- Harp – Deborah Fleisher
- Guitar – Dan Warner
- Bass Guitar – Julio Hernandez
- Trumpet – Arturo Sandoval, Jason Carder, Teddy Mulet
- Trombone – Dana Teboe, John Kricker
- French Horn – Dwayne Dixon, Jeffrey Meyer, John David Smith
- Flute – Jeanne Tarrant, Nestor Torres
- Clarinet – David Pharris
- Oboe – Robert Weiner
- Bassoon – Luciano Magnanini, Michael Degregorio
- Piano – Michael Levine
- Keyboards – Doug Emery
- Timpani – Mark Schubert
- Percussion – Andy Garcia, Archie Peña

Production Team

- Production Coordinators – Frank Amadeo, Mauricio Abaroa, Jorge A. Plasencia
- Talent Coordinators - Maria Luisa Calderon, Maria Elena Fermin, Mauricio Montenegro
- Studio Coordinator – Kevin Dillon
- Production Directors - Carlos Pulido, César Pulido
- Copyist – Eugenio Vanderhorst
- Engineers – Alfred Figueroa, Andre Rafael, Boris Milan, Eric Schilling, Franco Jordanni, Gustavo Celis, Hector I. Rosa, Isaias García Asbun, Javier Garza, Jim Monti, Joe Leal Sr., Marcelo Sabóia, Robb Williams, Roberto Ruiz
- Assistant Engineers - Jorge Gonzalez, José Rey, Juan Rosario, Javier Valverde, Charlie Vela, Ed Williams
- Mixer – Freddy Piñero, Jr

== Track listing ==
- Single
1. El Ultimo Adiós (Varios Artistas Version) 3:58
- EP
1. El Ultimo Adiós (Varios Artistas Version) 3:58
2. The Last Goodbye (Jon Secada English Language Version) 3:58
3. El Ultimo Adiós (Arturo Sandoval Instrumental Version) 3:58
4. El Ultimo Adiós (Gian Marco Version) 3:58

== Charts ==
The song failed to enter the charts, but the EP peaked at No. 197 on the Billboard 200.

Chart (2001)	Peak position
U.S. Billboard 200	197
U.S Billboard Latin Albums	3
U.S Billboard Latin Pop Albums	2

== Live performances ==
The song mainly circulated as a single to be purchased, but a few notable performances and presentations of the song include:

- The national radio simulcast of the White House's Hispanic Heritage Month Event hosted by President George W. Bush on October 14, 2001
- The video of the song was aired on Univision's variety show Sábado Gigante. The show's host, Don Francisco, came up with the idea to assemble an all-star group to record a tribute album on September 13, and was instrumental in supporting the project.
- Gian Marco recorded a solo acoustic version of the song which he has also performed in his concerts, prefacing the performance with "This song...was born with a guitar. And with that guitar, I will play it to you." He also stated that Don Francisco originally asked him for the song so he could include it in a program he was going to do for the September 11 attack but other artists such as Juan Luis Guerra came into the picture and the song became a collaboration between many artists.
