= Gloria Reyes =

Dominican politician (born 1986)

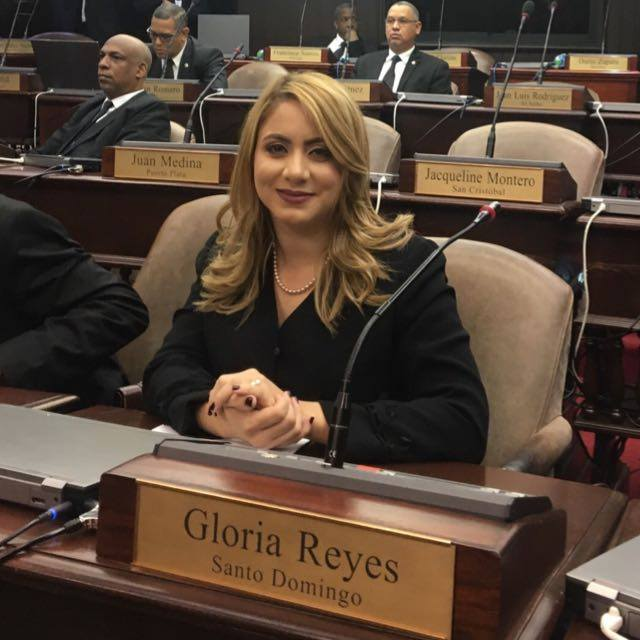
- Gloria Reyes in 2018

Minister of Women
- Incumbent
- Assumed office 7 January 2026
- President: Luis Abinader
- Preceded by: Mayra Jiménez

Member of the Chamber of Deputies of the Dominican Republic
- In office 16 August 2016 – 16 August 2020

Personal details
- Born: Gloria Roely Reyes Gómez; 19 October 1986 (age 39) Santo Domingo, Dominican Republic
- Party: Dominican Revolutionary Party (until 2014); Modern Revolutionary Party
- Education: Pontificia Universidad Católica Madre y Maestra; Complutense University of Madrid; University of Alcalá; Universidad Católica Santo Domingo
- Occupation: Politician

Gloria Roely Reyes Gómez (born 19 October 1986) is a Dominican politician who is serving as Minister of Women of the Dominican Republic since 2026. She previously served as member of the Chamber of Deputies between 2016 and 2020 and headed the Progresando con Solidaridad (Supérate) program between 2020 and 2026.

== Early life ==
Reyes was born on 19 October 1986 in Santo Domingo, Dominican Republic. Her father was a leader of the Dominican Revolutionary Party in the 1980s; he ran for the Chamber of Deputies of the Dominican Republic but was not elected in the party primaries.

She holds a degree in law from Pontificia Universidad Católica Madre y Maestra and a graduate degree in political science from Universidad Católica Santo Domingo, as well as master’s degrees in international law from Complutense University of Madrid and in microfinance and social development from University of Alcalá. Her other studies include specializations in political communication and election campaigns, as well as participation in leadership and political management programs through USAID, a program on women’s political empowerment in Israel, the FES New York Academy in 2018, and other training sessions on China and regional Latin American forums on equality and children’s rights.

== Career ==
Her political involvement began at a young age, when she led the Dominican Revolutionary Party’s youth campaign during the 2012 presidential elections; she served as national vice president of the PRD's Dominican Revolutionary Youth and joined the Modern Revolutionary Party’s political committee in 2014. In 2016, Reyes received the Esquina Joven Award from the newspaper Hoy, and in 2018 she won the National Youth Award, both in the political leadership category.

Reyes got elected member of the Chamber of Deputies in the 2016 general election representing Santo Domingo Province, becoming the youngest elected ever deputy of the Congress. She was sworn in on 16 August 2016. Between 2016 and 2017, she served as deputy spokesperson for the Modern Revolutionary Party's parliamentary group. In March 2017, Reyes initiated a discussion on reforming the Civil Code to eliminate child marriage, a measure that was approved by the Chamber of Deputies but not by the Senate.

Other measures he promoted as a Member of Parliament include initiatives to encourage young people’s political participation, the establishment of gender parity in the Political Parties Act and the Electoral System Act, the debate on legislation against gender-based violence, as well as abortion and other local advocacy projects. Her term ended on 16 August 2020 after she was not elected in the 2020 general election. She has been vicepresident of the Modern Revlutionary Party.

Newly elected President Luis Abinader named Reyes chairwoman of the Progresando con Solidaridad (Supérate) program on 16 August 2020.

On 7 January 2026 she was sworn in Minister of Women by Vice President Raquel Peña at the National Palace. In her inaugural address, Reyes stated that she will continue the work of her predecessor to strengthen the development and protection of Dominican women.

== Personal life ==
As a teenager, she took part in various sports, as well as modelling and theatre. She is married to Eduardo Peña, whom she met through the party.
