= Aida Bonnelly de Diaz =

Pianist, writer and artistic director from the Dominican Republic

Aída Bonnelly de Díaz (2 May 1926 – October 2013) was a pianist, writer and artistic director from the Dominican Republic. She served three times as artistic director of her country's national theatre. In 1983, she was made a Knight of the Venuezualen Order of Andrés Bello for her contributions to the arts.

== Early life and education ==
Bonnelly was born on 2 May 1926 in Santiago de los Caballeros. She grew up in Santo Domingo before attending Juilliard where she obtained a bachelor of piano in 1949. She next studied in Paris before returning to the Dominican Republic.

In the 1960s, she also obtained a postgraduate degree from the Catholic University, Washington.

== Career ==
=== Pianist ===
Bonnelly was a student of Manuela Jimenez. She showed promise at an early age. In November 1940, when she was only 14, Bonnelly took part in a concert organised by Enrique Casal Chapi, the director of the National Symphony Orchestra, on Haydn. Of her performance, Alfredo Matilla writing in La Opinión said "she played Haydn as it should be played. Despite her young age".

In December 1940, Bonnelly took part in another concert organised by Casal Chapi, this time of the music of Beethoven. Of her performance, Matilla, writing again in La Opinión, said was said "Aida Bonnelly gave a remarkable performance of the Sonata alla tedesca.... In Aida Bonnelly, it's hard to know what to admire more: the composure or precision.... she already knows... where the secret of music lies: first in feeling it, then in understanding it, and finally, in perfecting the technique. At [her] age, this... is rarely achieved, but she has accomplished it beyond measure."

In June 1941, she took part in a concert featuring the music of Bach of which Matilla said "Bonnelly... gave a remarkable performance... demonstrating her abilities as a performer through her grasp of the strength and character of [Bach's] music." This was followed in August 1941, by a group concert of Schubert's music.

In July 1945, she played a final solo concert before leaving the Dominican Republic to study in the US. After studying at Juilliard, Bonnelly played in Puerto Rico in 1949. Back in the Dominican Republic, she gave a solo recital in December 1949 at the Rialto Theatre. Her performance was the subject of two reviews in La Nación, one by Jose Jiménez Belén and another by Manolo Pérez. In 1950, she had a joint concert with Mary Siragusa at the French Legion.

In May 1952, Bonnelly and Manuel Rueda played a two-piano performance at the National Symphony Orchestra, one of Bach and the other of Mozart.

Bonnelly, Rueda and Carlos Piantini received special mention for their "excellent performances" from the critic at La Nación following a concert at Club de Musica in November 1953.

=== Artistic director ===
From 1955 to 1961, Bonnelly de Díaz was the director of the piano department at the National Conservatory of Music. Bonnelly's pupils included Frieda Marion Landais.

From 1973 to 1978, she was one of two artistic directors at the National Theatre of Santo Domingo.

In 1979, she served as the director of music of the National Library. From 1980 to 1983 and again from 1987 to 1990, she served as artistic director of the National Theater.

Bonnelly wrote the books Testimonios del Canto y las palabras, Variaciones, En Torno a la Música, and Los Ninos y Las Artes. Bonnelly also wrote at times for the daily newspaper, Listín Diario.

In 2015, the writer and critic, Marianne de Tolentino, posthumously collected some of Bonnelly's works in a book entitled Voces de Aída.

== Awards and honours ==
In 1978, Bonnelly won a national prize for her book En Torno a la Música.

In 1983, she was made a knight of the Venuezuelan Order of Andrés Bello for her contributions to the arts.

== Death and legacy ==
Bonnelly died on 27 October 2013 and was buried the same day in the Christ the Redeemer Cemetery in Santo Domingo. She was survived by one son and one daughter.

The National Theatre renamed its Hall of Culture, which Bonnelly had established during her second turn as artistic director, the Aída Bonnelly de Díaz Hall in her honour. In 2024, the country's President, Luis Abinader, announced plans for a Aída Bonnelly de Díaz High School in the Pantoja neighbourhood of Santo Domingo.

== Works ==
- Bonnelly de Díaz, Aida (2015). de Tolentino, Marianne (ed.). Voces de Aída. Santo Domingo: Central Bank of the Domincan Republic (Banco Central de la República Dominicana). ISBN 9789945443622.
- Bonnelly de Diaz, Aida (1992). Los niños y las artes. Santo Domingo: Alfa y Omega.
- Bonnelly de Díaz, Aida. (1991) Retablo de costumbres dominicanas. Santiago: Pucamayma.
- Bonnelly de Diaz, Aida (1990). En Torno a la Música: Guía para la apreciación musical. Santo Domingo: Taller. ISBN 9993430226.
- Bonnelly de Díaz, Aida (1986). Variaciones. Taller.
- Bonnelly de Díaz, Aída (1981). Testimonios del Canto y las palabras. Santo Domingo: Alfa y Omega.
