= Orquesta Sinfónica Nacional =

Orquesta Sinfónica Nacional may refer to:

- National Symphony Orchestra of Colombia, the re-establishment in 2004 of an orchestra founded in 1952
- National Symphony Orchestra (Dominican Republic), founded 1941
- National Symphony Orchestra (Peru), founded 1938
- National Symphony Orchestra (Mexico) founded 1949
