= Antonio Puesan =

Dominican baseball analyst and writer

Antonio Puesán
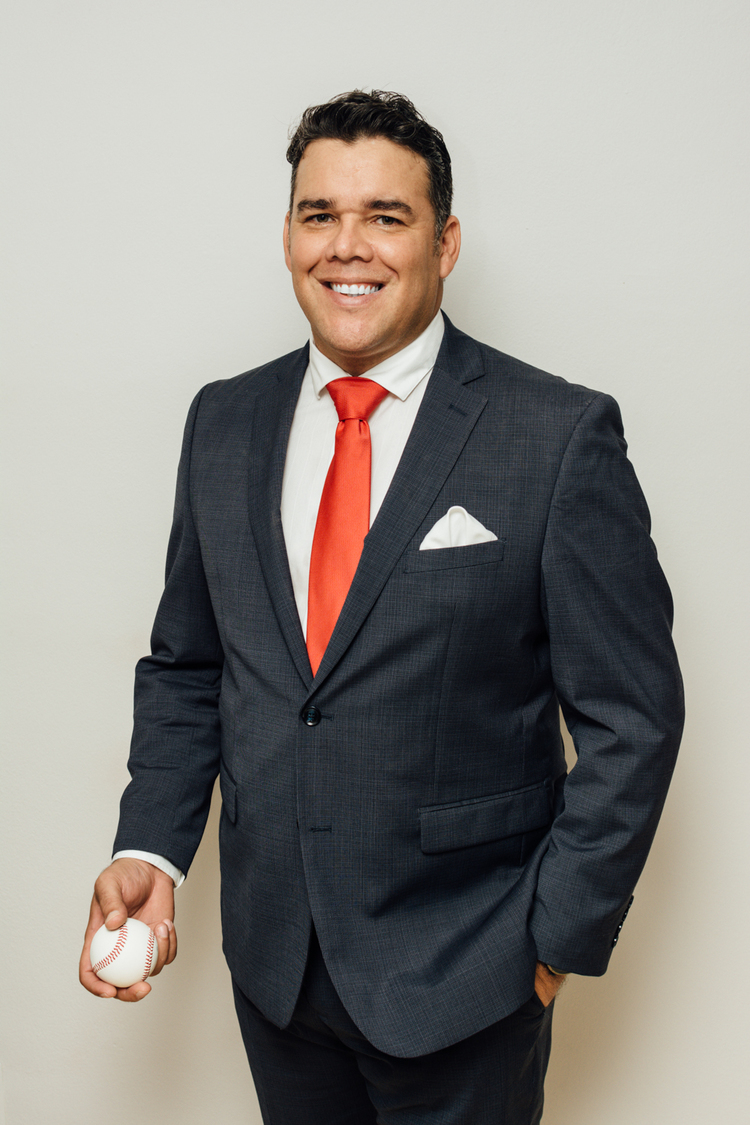
- Antonio Puesán
- Born: March 19, 1974 (age 52); Caracas, Venezuela
- Occupation: Baseball analyst

Antonio José Silva Puesán (born 19 March 1974 in Caracas, Venezuela), professionally known as Antonio Puesán, is a baseball analyst, writer, television and radio personality based in Miami, Florida and a native of the Dominican Republic. He is a baseball analyst for "El Locker Room 1050" on ESPN Deportes Radio's WEPN 1050 AM. He also works as a digital creative strategist in marketing, focused on sports brands and events in social media.

Earlier in his career, Puesán was a creative art director. He was a Kansas City Royals minor league pitcher from 1993 to 1995.

== Early life and education ==
Puesán was born in Caracas, Venezuela, three years after which he was raised in the Dominican Republic by his grandparents Rafael Puesán Ramirez and Ana Méndez de Puesán in February 1977, he became a Dominican citizen in 1992 by a Dominican Republic resolution made by former President Joaquín Balaguer as a requirement to be available to sign as a free agent with the Kansas City Royals in 1993, Puesán started to play baseball in March 1983, and at age 10 developed a heart condition caused by rheumatic fever.

Puesán finished high school at 17 at Centro de Educación Integral CEDI where he spent the last two years, after that he served with José Antonio Mena as a commentator at the 1991 Little League World Series Latinamerica qualifier in Dominican Republic. In 1992, he began studying advertising at the Universidad Católica Santo Domingo.

== Baseball career ==
Puesán was signed as an amateur free agent by the Kansas City Royals in May 1993 by Diómedes Castellanos and regional scout Luis Silverio. He pitched in the Dominican Summer League at the rookie level in Salcedo. After dealing with many injuries he was granted an unconditional release in 1995.

== Creative art director ==
In 1997, Puesán went to La Escuela de Diseño (the school of design), an affiliate of the Parsons School of Design in Altos de Chavón at La Romana, Dominican Republic.

== Television journalism ==
In 2005, Puesán began as a sports analyst with Alberto Rodríguez for "Antesala Capitaleña" on Telecentro Canal 13. In 2010, he joined the "Out 37 TV" crew at CDN 37, a nationwide Dominican TV station. After that he became a commentator with Radhamés González for the Tigres del Licey international broadcasts. He participated in several TV sports shows as a baseball analyst for the winter league baseball draft in 2014. He served as commentator with Hansel Coste at the Dominican Summer League All Star Game in 2014. In 2018 created a Podcast named El Clubhouse.

== Radio journalism ==
Puesán's first opportunity in radio was in 2006 while working on an interactive sports talk show. In 2011, he joined the "Out 37 Radio" team on 92.5 FM at CDN La Radio on weekdays. He joined ESPN Deportes Radio Dominican Republic 104.5 FM as a sports analyst at "Desayuno Deportivo" (breakfast sports), an early sports talk show with Melvin Bejarán, Orlando Méndez and José Luis Mendoza.

In 2012, Puesán produced "Sobre el Diamante Radio" (on the diamond radio) with Carmen Sarah Mota at digital online radio station UniK Radio in 2012, but it failed to attract sponsors and stopped after six months. With Yohanna Nuñez and Alexander Gómez, he is a current member of "Ligas Menores en Acción" (minor league in action) Saturdays on Licey TV. In 2015, Puesán became a baseball analyst for "El Locker Room 1050" with Rafael Bello on ESPN Deportes Radio 1050 AM New York.

== Online career ==
Puesán has very active social media accounts, writing about sports (particularly baseball) and digital marketing. In 2012, he was nominated as a Deportista Tuitero (sports tweeter) in the Dominican Republic TwitAwards. In 2013, he was nominated for Cronista Tuitero (chronicler-tweeter).

Puesan is currently a social media coordinator for Toros del Este, a professional winter league baseball team in the Dominican Republic. Started in 2017 as Operations and Digital Marketing associate at Magnus Media working first 6 months in the Sports Division and then stated to work with famous salsa singer and grammy awarded artist Marc Anthony handling all his social media platform, ending his contract in December 2019. In 2018 worked as Social Media Coordinator for Baseball Hall of Famer Vladimir Guerrero and contributed with his social media presence obtaining 92.9% in the 2nd ballot, he received 71.1% in his first opportunity. He finished his contract after Hall of Fame induction. In 2020 during the Pandemic created Nación Marketing with Shantal Disla to develop opportunities to train people interested in learning about Digital Marketing in the sports area, creating online seminars on various topics.

In 2021 Puesan was promoted to Digital Marketing Director for Toros del Este after the growth success of a communication style setting trends in Dominican baseball League LIDOM and also in the professional baseball sports circuit in the Caribbean. From creating #ToroLona during the transmission of a game on television in Mexico the previous season, to the effect of # Torolío to conquer the 20th crown of the Dominican Republic in the Caribbean Series in Puerto Rico, are examples of the transcendence achieved for Antonio Puesán with Toros.
