= Kathleen Martínez =

Dominican archaeologist (born 1966)

- Martínez in 2026
- Born: Kathleen Teresa Martínez Berry; September 1, 1966 (age 60); Santo Domingo, Dominican Republic
- Education: Universidad Nacional Pedro Henríquez Ureña; Brown University
- Occupations: Archaeologist, diplomat
- Known for: Searching for the tomb of Cleopatra
- Spouse: José Nazar

Kathleen Teresa Martínez Berry (born September 1, 1966) is a Dominican archaeologist, lawyer, and diplomat, best known for her work in search of the tomb of Cleopatra in Egypt. She heads the Egyptian-Dominican mission in Alexandria and is currently minister counselor in charge of cultural affairs at the Dominican embassy in Egypt.

== Early life ==
Kathleen Martínez was born in Santo Domingo in 1966. Her father, professor and legal scholar Fausto Martínez, owned an extensive private library, which she drew on to research the subject that would become her great passion: Egypt and the last days of Cleopatra. Her mother is of Franco-English descent.

Despite her childhood passion for Egypt, Martínez focused her early studies on a legal career. "My parents had convinced me that it was not worthwhile for me to be an archaeologist because I would never have a serious job and could not make a living from that profession," she explained in some of her interviews. Like her father, she studied law, attending the Universidad Nacional Pedro Henríquez Ureña, as well as going to study English at Brown University in the United States. She graduated at 19, and began working as a lawyer. She also holds master's degrees in finance and archaeology.

Her interest in Cleopatra originated from an argument with her father in 1990 and a group of friends who deemed her biography as insignificant. Martínez asserts that delving into Cleopatra's history, despite the influence of Roman propaganda and enduring biases against women over the centuries, revealed a figure ahead of her time. "She knew medicine, laws; she was a philosopher, a poet," Martínez explains. After advancing in her research, she discovered the difference between oriental texts and ones written by the Romans. She had studied the canonical texts in detail, in particular Plutarch's account of Mark Antony's alliance with Cleopatra. She also found that modern researchers had possibly missed important clues about where she was buried.

== Search for Cleopatra's tomb ==
Her initial hypothesis was that, since Cleopatra was considered the representation of Isis, if she had to search for a place to be buried in her last days, she would have chosen a temple dedicated to the goddess.

Martínez argues that Cleopatra's death was:

a ritual act of deep religious significance carried out in a very strict, spiritualized ceremony. ... Cleopatra negotiated with Octavian to allow her to bury Mark Antony in Egypt. She wanted to be buried with him because she wanted to reenact the legend of Isis and Osiris. The true meaning of the cult of Osiris is that it grants immortality. After their deaths, the gods would allow Cleopatra to live with Antony in another form of existence, so they would have eternal life together.

From Strabo's descriptions of ancient Egypt, Martínez sketched a map of potential burial sites and identified 21 localities associated with the legend of Isis and Osiris. After ruling out some temples, she located one on the outskirts of Alexandria that met all her criteria to be the one that sheltered the tomb: the temple of Taposiris Magna.

This was at odds with another hypothesis, developed by French explorer Franck Goddio and the European Institute of Underwater Archaeology, seeking the tomb in a palace of Alexandria that had been buried underwater by an earthquake, whose excavations were resumed in 1992.

Martínez acknowledges that Cleopatra was likely indeed buried in Alexandria by Octavian as suggested by ancient accounts, however she believes that "after the mummification process was complete, the priests at Taposiris Magna buried the bodies of Cleopatra and Mark Antony in a different place without the approval of the Romans" in order to protect the bodies had Romans decided to desecrate them.

=== First trip to Egypt ===
Martínez made her first trip to Egypt in 2002. She managed to contact Zahi Hawass, the archaeologist and director of the Supreme Council of Antiquities, and visit some temples. When she arrived at Taposiris Magna, she understood that it was the place she was looking for. She returned to her country and prepared a project with the support of the Universidad Católica Santo Domingo to begin excavating. Kathleen Martínez herself financed the first expedition and many others. Work began in 2004. In 2005, she decided to leave her law practice to move to Egypt and dedicate herself to archaeology.

Martínez returned to the Dominican Republic, met with the Dominican Republic Minister of Foreign Affairs, was appointed as the first Minister of Culture to Egypt, and was issued a diplomatic passport.

=== Excavations at Taposiris Magna ===
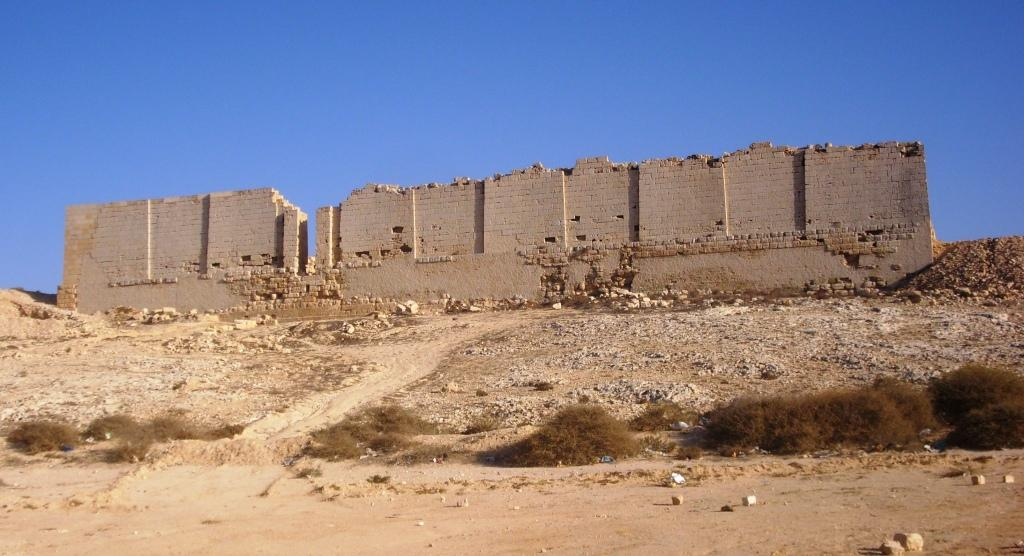
Osiris Temple at Taposiris Magna

Taposiris Magna is a semi-destroyed temple located on the edge of Lake Mariout in Borg El Arab, about 50 kilometers west of Alexandria. It was not the first time the site had been excavated; the first expedition had been sent by Napoleon. The Egyptian authorities considered it an insignificant, incomplete temple. However, Martínez contends that it had been ravaged, abandoned, and buried in the sand.

In 2008, ground-penetrating radar (GPR) was used to facilitate the search. It detected a network of tunnels and underground corridors at depths of 20.7 m, and three structures that could be burial chambers. The archaeological evidence includes two subterranean chambers within the temple's walls. A hieroglyphic and Demotic stele has also been located, indicating that the temple was considered holy ground. In July 2011 the magazine National Geographic dedicated its cover story and a report to the project. In 2016, this was supplemented by a GPR surveyor using more powerful radar to detect new chambers and follow the extent of the tunnels already discovered, potentially speeding up excavation work.

In 2018, it was announced that more than 800 artifacts had been located, as well as a large cemetery with fifteen catacombs, 800 bodies, and 14 mummies all from the same period.

In January 2019, controversy arose over the possibility that the discovery of the tombs was imminent, attributed to remarks by Zahi Hawass at a conference at the University of Palermo. Hawass denied the news in an article in the newspaper Al-Ahram, affirming that the thesis that the tombs were in Taposiris Magna was not his but that of Kathleen Martínez, and that he did not believe Martínez's hypothesis because "the Egyptians never buried inside a temple", given that "the temples were for worshipping, and this was for the goddess Isis. It is therefore unlikely that Cleopatra was buried there."

Egyptian-Dominican researchers led by Kathleen Martinez announced the discovery of 2,000-year-old ancient tombs with golden tongues dating to the Greek and Roman periods at Taposiris Magna in 2021. The team also unearthed gold leaf amulets in the form of tongues placed for speaking with the god Osiris in the afterlife. The mummies were depicted in different forms: one of them was wearing a crown, decorated with horns, and the cobra snake at the forehead and the other was depicted with gilded decorations representing the wide necklace.

A documentary about her work titled Cleopatra's Final Secret premiered on the National Geographic channel in 2025.

== Exhibition at the Cairo Museum ==
On April 18, 2018, the Cairo Museum inaugurated the exhibition "10 Years of Dominican Archaeology in Egypt", where the advances, achievements, and more than 350 artifacts discovered by Martínez from the Ptolemaic dynasty were displayed. The artifacts are a record of daily life, administrative and religious activities, and royal and social roles that emerged at the end of the Ptolemaic period. The exhibition highlighted the first contribution of Latin America to the science of Egyptology.

The most significant piece is the so-called "Taposiris Magna Stele", with a decree from Ptolemy V revealing the date of the temple's construction to be between 221 and 203 BCE, and demonstrating, according to Martínez, the importance of said religious construction dedicated to the goddess Isis.

== Personal life ==
She is married to José Nazar, a Chilean American investor who owns the Houdini estate in Los Angeles.

== Awards and honors ==
- National Youth Award (2010)
- Cultural Personality of the Year Award (2011)
- Recognition of the Foreign Ministry of the Dominican Republic "for her substantial contributions to universal culture and for placing the Dominican Republic on the world map of the intellectual community" (2018)
- Forbes 50 Over 50 Global List (2025)
