= Miguel Vila Luna =

- Born: Miguel Eduardo Vila–Luna; July 7, 1943; Santiago de los Caballeros, Dominican Republic
- Died: April 1, 2005 (aged 61); Santo Domingo, Dominican Republic
- Education: American University; Catholic University; Palais de Fontainebleau; Universidad de Puerto Rico
- Occupation: Architect
- Awards: Patrimonio Cultural de la República Dominicana; Sociedad de Arquitectos de la Republica Dominicana; Premio Diseño de Interiores; Gran Premio Bienal; VIII Bienal Nacional; XI Bienal Nacional; Premio Banco Nacional de la Vivienda 1983 de Diseño Arquitectónico
- Buildings: Plaza de la Cultura, Oficinas Ejecutivas Industrias Nigua, Museo de la Historia Natural
- Projects: Saint Michel's, Hotel Capella Beach Resort, Le Grand Café, Misión ILAC
- Design: Residencial Lunas Ferrari, Residencial(es) Casa de Campo, Amber Cove Monuments, Punta Cana Resort Hotel Lobby (remodel)

Miguel Eduardo "Micky" Vila Luna (July 7, 1943 – April 1, 2005) was an architect and painter from the Dominican Republic.

== Early life and education ==
Miguel Vila Luna was born in Santiago de los Caballeros, Dominican Republic on July 7, 1943. His parents were Ramón Vila Piola (who led a revolt against dictator Rafael Leónidas Trujillo Molina alongside Juan Isidro Jimenes Grullón in 1934), and Ana Gregoria Luna. Vila was an individual linked to design, to aspects of decorative comfort, to pictorial work, but from the training of architecture and above all, in cultivated sensitivity that formed in the roots of his family life. After his early training in painting with Rafael Arzeno, he took up an artistic career at an art course at the University of Puerto Rico and graduated as an architect at the Catholic University of America in Washington, D.C. He also attended the American University and the École Américaine des Beaux-Arts in the Palais de Fontainebleau in France. He died on April 1, 2005, in Santo Domingo, Dominican Republic.

== Architectural development ==
Miguel Vila Luna was officially introduced during the so-called "twelve years of Balaguer", from 1966 to 1978, which mark the Dominican territory an unavoidable stage in the development of national architecture and urbanism. Joaquín Balaguer, former president of the country, was able to choose well, at this stage, his architects. The list of outstanding projects designated for several specific architects is long and plentiful. Miguel Vila led a new style among Dominican professionals, in which he dedicated himself to the discipline of including landscaping in buildings. After Balaguer's two reelections, his control over the architecture was reduced. In addition, the interactional architectural scene changes drastically. A new generation of postmodernity arises including architects such as Miguel Vila, Plácido Piña, Teófilo Carbonell, Angel Giudicelli, Oscar Imbert, Gustavo Luis "Cuquito" Moré, Tácito Cordero, among others.

In those years, Miguel Vila, with his unequaled leadership among the youngest architects, produced a series of private works that imposed part of the aesthetic guidelines of postmodernism. Vila, whose work began in the early 1970s under the laws of modern architecture, gradually penetrated the study of regional architecture to his enthusiastic attachment of historicist architecture, from where he developed multiple proposals that produced a whole environment of innovations in the national scenario. Convinced of the aesthetic strength of architecture as a key element for a better quality of life, Miguel Vila developed particular work for space and formal capacities, which was advanced for his era. This became references for the architects of the period which reproduced his criteria of integrating architecture with the exterior. The sequence, spatial categorization, and wealth of decorative resources were set by Vila as motivators for the coexistence. His treatment of the walls in which he rejected the edges and framed the gaps were part of his language, which was used for a whole generation. His followers became, later, protagonists of architecture committed to tropical solutions.

Since its inauguration, Casa de Campo, Dominican Republic has undergone significant changes in its original concept of architecture. The designs of Miguel Vila, Roberto Copa, William Cox, Rafael Eduardo Selman, Jose Horacio Marranzini and his son Alejandro have been important in its development.

== Artistic style ==
In 1963, his pictorial works appeared in the XI National Biennial. In 1979, Micky recorded his first exhibition which was held in Paris, in the Ives Brun gallery. He headed a movement with the poet Manuel Antonio Rueda González that offered the following traits: a plurality of readings of the work, active participation in the spectator's interpretation, inseparability of color and form, integration of universal and local elements, and motivations to the plastic and psycho-philosophies. His artistic movement of futurism was rich in followers. His works resemble futurism and are bountiful in brilliant compositions of color and movement.
