= Taposiris Magna =

Ancient Egyptian site

- Abousir
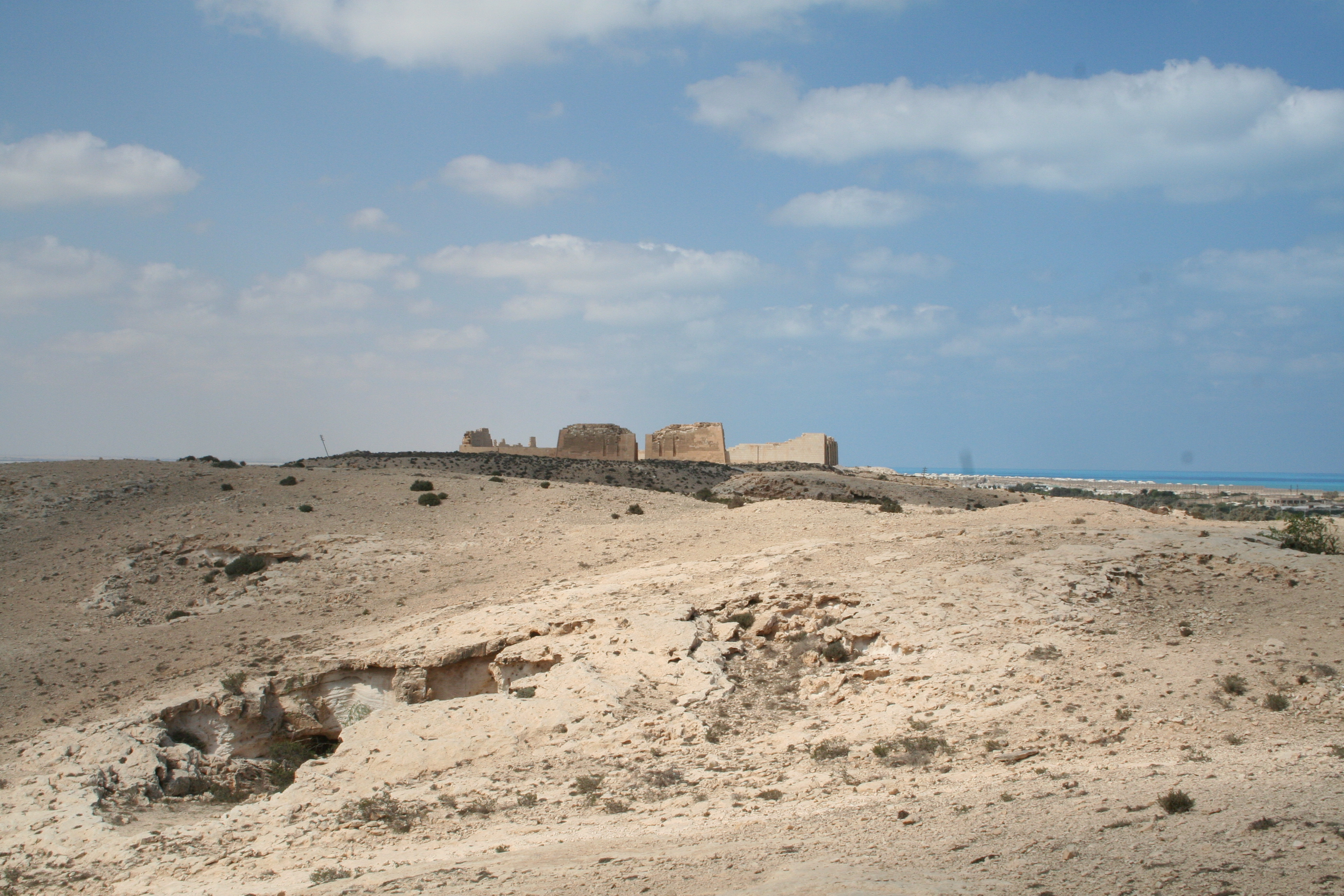
- The Osiris temple at Taposiris Magna, Ptolemaic period, as seen in 2006

- Location within Egypt
- 30°56′46.2″N 29°31′7.3″E
- Type: Settlement, Temple
- Periods: Ptolemaic Egypt
- Location: Alexandria Governorate, Egypt
- Region: Alexandria

History
- Built: 280 – 270 BC
- Built by: Ptolemy II, Ptolemy IV

Taposiris Magna, also known as Tapusir Magna, is a city established by Pharaoh Ptolemy II Philadelphus between 280 and 270 BC. The name means "great tomb of Osiris", which Plutarch identifies with an Egyptian temple in the city. Taposiris Magna lies about 30 miles west of Alexandria in the Egyptian coastal town of Borg El Arab.

During the Ptolemaic period, Taposiris Magna became a center for the religious festival of Khoiak. Napoleon arrived in Egypt during 1798 and French scientists subsequently conducted a survey of the architecture of the city published in the Description de l'Égypte. Procopius recorded that it was said to be the burial site of Osiris.

In the twentieth century, excavations of the site were started under the Italian Evaristo Breccia. The ancient Greek historian Callisthenes states that Alexander the Great visited the city on his way to Siwa Oasis, which gives credence to the theory that there must have been a town there in the Hellenistic period.

== Role in trade ==
The city stood on the navigable arm of the now dried-out bed of the ancient Lake Mariout. The size of the lake raises the possibility that the harbor played a role in the trade between Egypt and Libya. Traders from the west could use water transportation to the harbor and then take a caravan route. Similarly, trade from Libya could be shipped aboard boats to Taposiris and transported to interior cities of Egypt, however this theory has its critics. The wine produced in this part of Egypt was famous during this ancient time.

== The temple and the tower ==
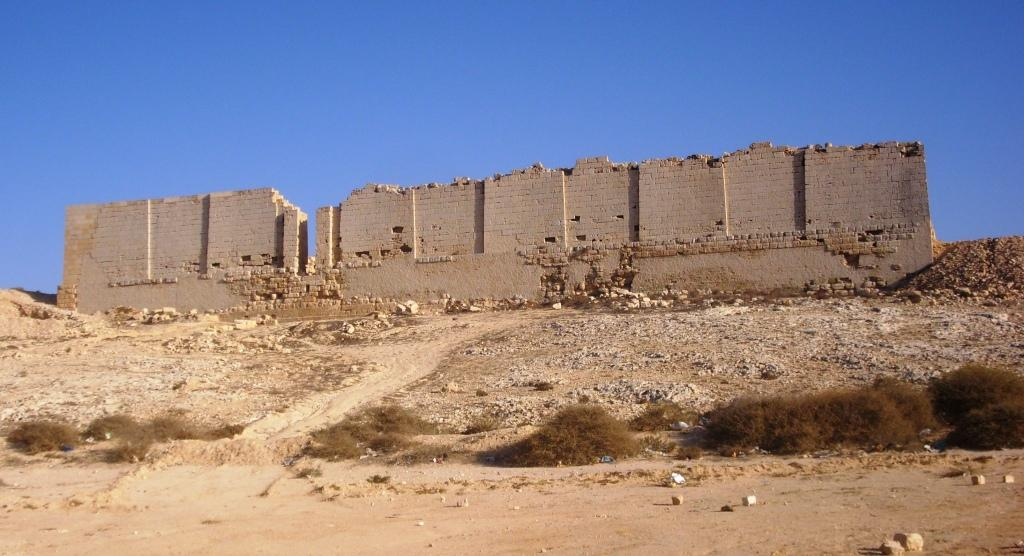
Southern wall of the acropolis of Taposiris Magna, as seen in 2013

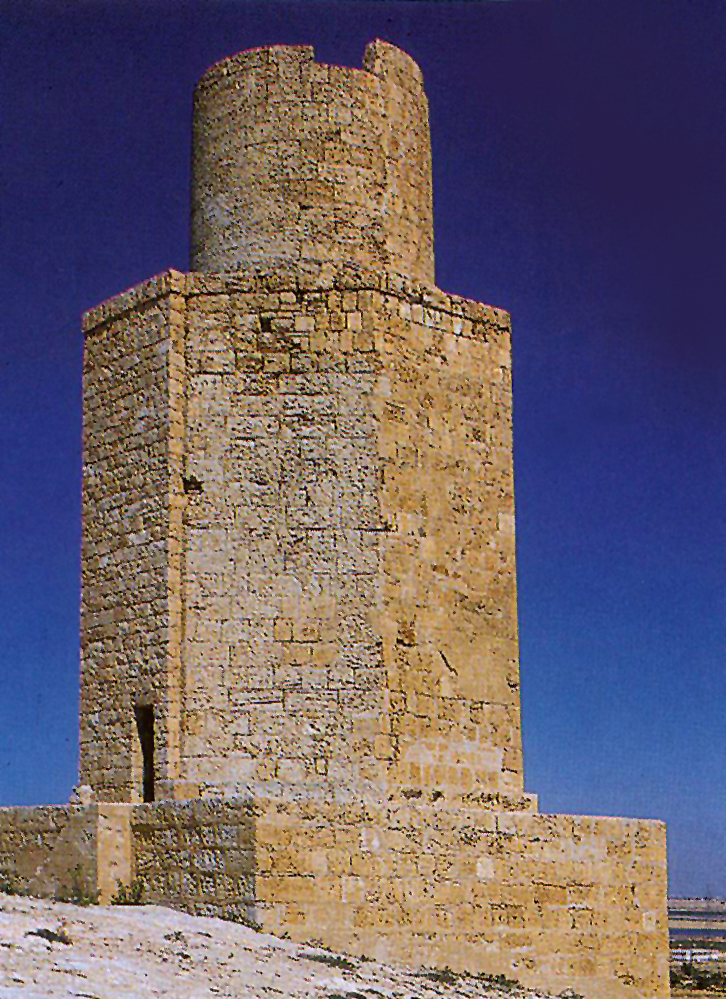
Ruins of the tower

Atop the Taenia ridge, an outcropping of limestone that separates the sea from Lake Maerotis, stand two ancient monuments that were partly restored in the 1930s. One is a tower that has been used as a guide in the reconstruction of the lighthouse of Alexandria and the other is the remains of a temple of Osiris that is believed to be the last resting place of Cleopatra.

In the most scholarly study of the tower conducted by 1974, it was concluded that "the Tower of Abusir" was definitely not a lighthouse nor even a watchtower. It probably was constructed during the Ptolemaic reign after the Pharos lighthouse was built and was a funerary monument.

== Other nearby structures ==
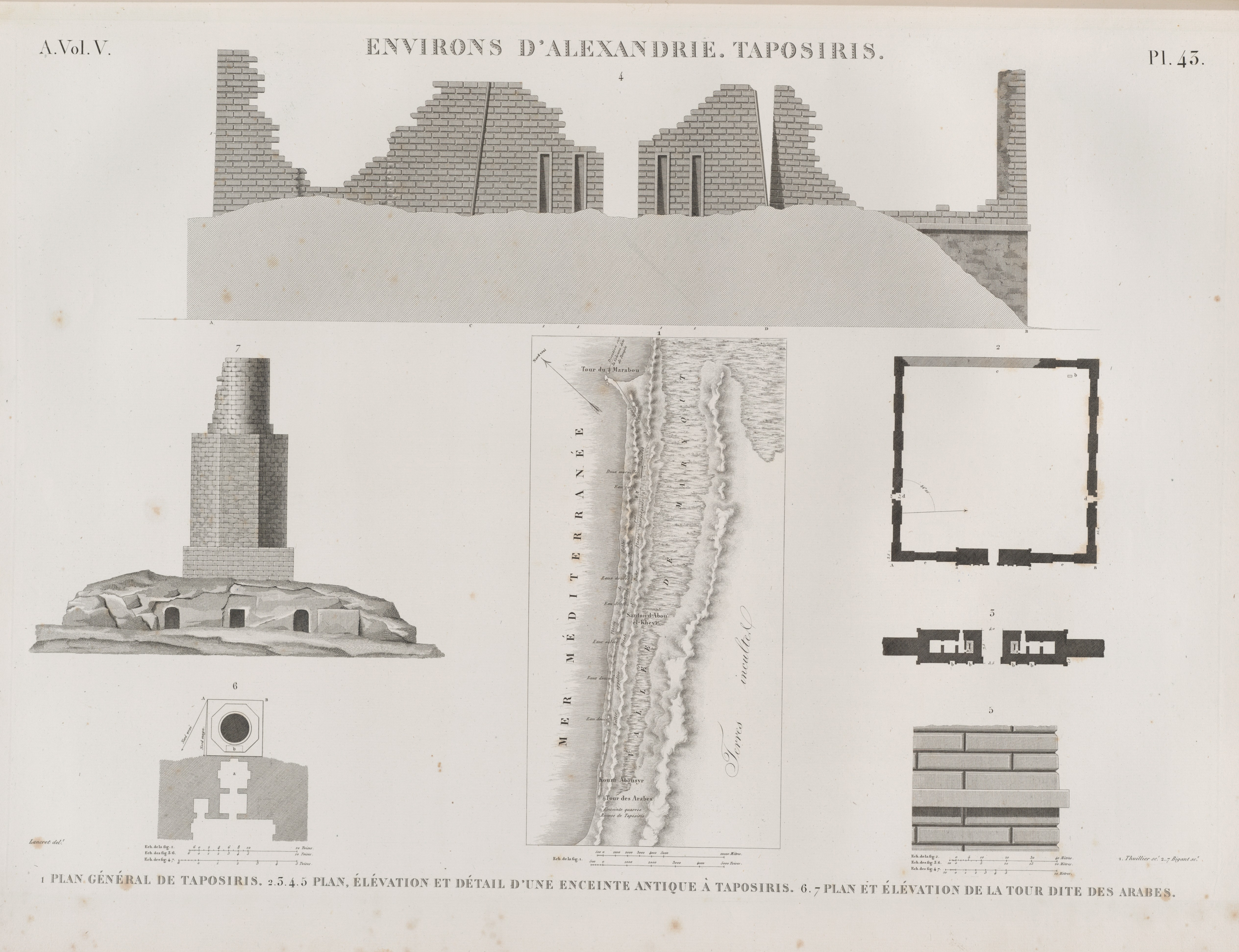
The site in the Description de l'Égypte, 1809

Both private and public buildings have been found in the neighborhood along with cisterns and churches. The necropolis shows a variety of burial styles from sarcophagi or pyramids to columns or pilasters. This ancient settlement was occupied from the second century BC to the seventh century AD.

In 2022, a tunnel beneath this ancient Egyptian temple was discovered at a depth of 20 metres. The tunnel is 2 metres high and 1,305 metres long and it transported water to thousands of people. It is identical to the Tunnel of Eupalinos in Greece that also transported water.

== Recent excavations ==
Various archaeologists have been working on the site since 1998. In 2010, archaeologists discovered a huge granite statue of a Ptolemaic king that was headless and the original gate to a temple dedicated to the god Osiris. The statue is crafted following the traditional ancient representation of an Egyptian king wearing a collar and a kilt. According to Dr. Zahi Hawass the monumental sculpture could represent the Hellenistic-era pharaoh Ptolemy IV, who constructed the Taposiris Magna temple. The team also found limestone foundation stones that would have lined the entrance to the temple. One of these stones bears evidence indicating that the entrance was lined with a series of Sphinx statues similar to those of the pharaonic era.

A necropolis containing many Greco-Roman style mummies was discovered behind the temple. Hawass said that early investigations revealed that these mummies were buried with their faces turned toward the temple and he noted that this suggested that the temple likely contained the burial of a significant royal personality, possibly Cleopatra VII herself.

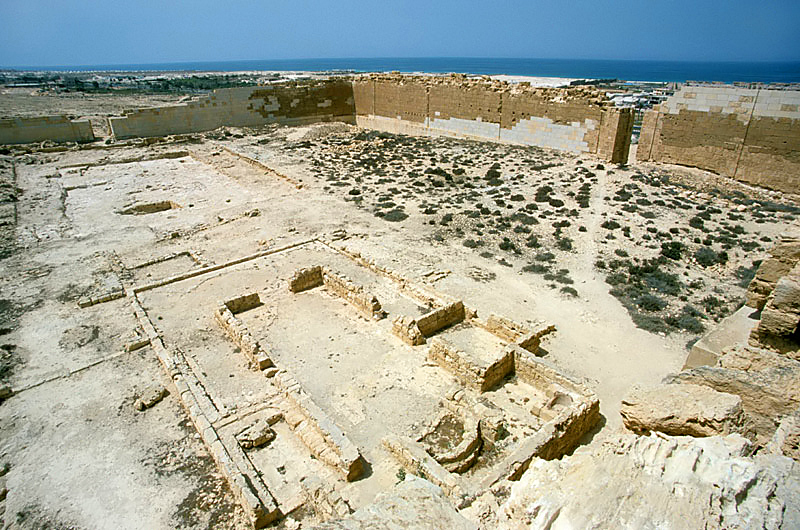
Courtyard in the Temple of Osiris, Abu Sir (Taposiris magna), Egypt, 2003

The expedition started in 2002 as a self-funded expedition led by a Dominican lawyer, Kathleen Martínez, who came up with theory that - after being buried by Octavian Augustus in Alexandria - Cleopatra VII was secretly exhumated by Egyptian priests and reburied in Taposiris Magna. She cites as her reasoning the place association with cult of Osiris and her own interpretation of Cleopatra's actions in August 30 BC:

What brought me to the conclusion that Taposiris Magna was a possible place for Cleopatra's hidden tomb was the idea that her death was a ritual act of deep religious significance carried out in a very strict, spiritualized ceremony. ... Cleopatra negotiated with Octavian to allow her to bury Mark Antony in Egypt. She wanted to be buried with him because she wanted to reenact the legend of Isis and Osiris. The true meaning of the cult of Osiris is that it grants immortality. After their deaths, the gods would allow Cleopatra to live with Antony in another form of existence, so they would have eternal life together.

— Kathleen Martinez

She has found 27 tombs, 20 of which are shaped like vaulted sarcophagi, partly underground and partly above ground. The remaining seven consist of staircases leading to simple burial chambers. Inside these tombs, her team found a total of 10 mummies, 2 of them gilded. The discovery of this cemetery indicates that an important person, likely of royal status, could be buried inside the temple. The style of the newly discovered tombs indicates that they were constructed during the Greco-Roman period. Martinez states that the expedition has excavated a temple at Taposiris Magna dedicated to the goddess Isis and has discovered coins depicting the face of Alexander the Great. They have found a number of deep shafts inside the temple, three of which seem to have been used for burials. It is possible that these shafts were the tombs of important people. The team leaders believe that Cleopatra and Mark Antony could have been buried in a deep shaft similar to those already discovered inside the temple.

Martinez said that the expedition found a beautiful sculpture of the head of Cleopatra, along with 22 coins bearing her image. The statue and coins show her as a beauty, contradicting a suggestion by an English museum curator that she was unattractive. These finds from Taposiris demonstrate a distinct attractiveness. Contradicting another advanced theory, the features of the sculpted head show no characteristics that would suggest sub-Saharan ancestry. The team also found many amulets, along with a beautiful headless statue dating to the Ptolemaic Period. Among the most interesting finds is a unique bust of a man with a cleft chin, which bears some similarity to known depictions of Mark Antony.

A radar survey of the temple of Taposiris Magna, west of Alexandria, Egypt, had been completed earlier in 2002 as part of the search for the tomb of Cleopatra and Mark Antony. The Supreme Council of Antiquities (SCA) expedition excavating the temple and its surrounding area was headed by Zahi Hawass, then secretary general of the SCA, and Kathleen Martinez, the scholar from the Dominican Republic.

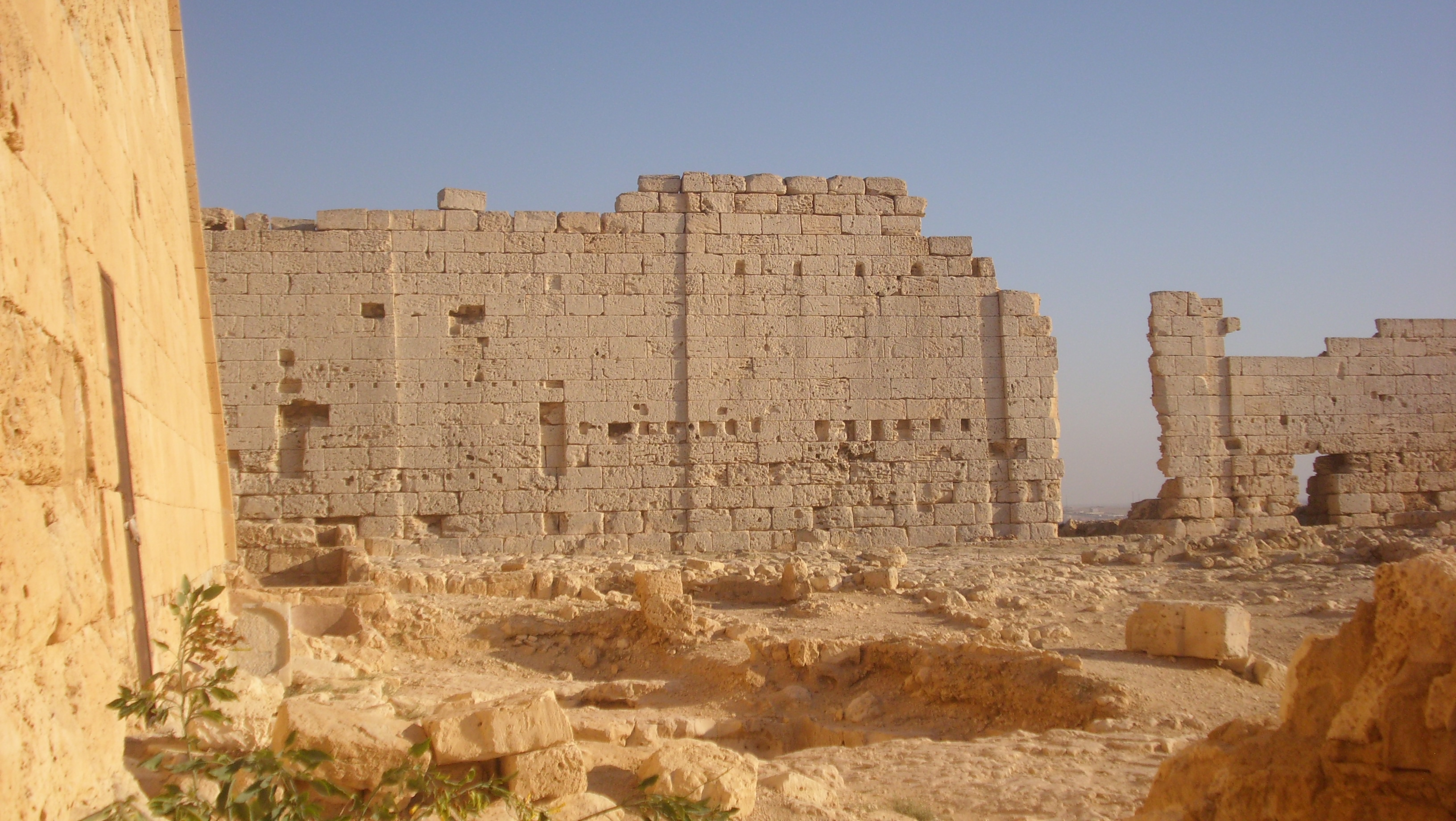
Internal view towards South of the Osiris Temple in Taposiris Magna as of 2013

In 2012, it was discovered that the ruins had been affected by the Second Battle of El Alamein. The team had found several unexploded bombs as well as charred remains of Italian and New Zealand soldiers within its tunnels. As of 2013, the excavation had been halted, but Martinez was later given permission to continue her work on the site.

In a 2015 television documentary called "Cleopatra's Lost Tomb" (shown October, Channel 4 in the UK), Martinez said that she was sure that they were close to finding the tomb there, possibly in a corner of the site where two likely tombs deep underground had been discovered. It was hoped that work to investigate the likely tombs would commence when the official digging season opened in 2016.

On 21 June 2020, Science Channel released a two-hour documentary entitled "Cleopatra: Sex, Lies, and Secrets" to reveal recent discoveries.

In January 2021, Egyptian-Dominican researchers led by Kathleen Martínez announced the discovery of 2,000-year-old ancient tombs with golden tongues dating to the Greek and Roman periods. Her team also unearthed gold leaf amulets in the form of tongues placed for speaking with the deity Osiris in the afterlife. The mummies were decorated in different ways: one was wearing a crown, which had the horns of the deity Hathor and a sculpted cobra snake representing the deity Wadjet at the forehead; the other mummy was wearing gilded decorations representing a wide necklace.

In 2022, it was reported that a 1,305-meter water-transport tunnel dating to the Ptolemaic period was found 20 meters below ground.

Excavations carried out in 2024 and 2025 by Martinez's team, in collaboration with Universidad Nacional Pedro Henríquez Ureña from Santo Domingo from the Dominican Republic, at the temple of Taposiris Magna:

"discovered hundreds of human remains, including mummies that were once covered in gold leaf, as well as pottery, and more than 300 coins, some bearing the image of Cleopatra. The ceramics date to around the time of Cleopatra's rule, 51 to 30 B.C., the Egyptian Ministry of Tourism and Antiquities announced last December [2024]."

Martinez's team also discovered "a foundation plate at the temple site, with an inscription in Greek and hieroglyphics that indicated the temple had been dedicated to the goddess Isis" which is significant since Cleopatra considered herself a living embodiment of this Egyptian goddess and frequently associated herself with this deity in her surviving monuments.

In 2025, a sunken port in the Mediterranean Sea off the coast of Taposiris Magna was discovered after excavation of the tunnel discovered in 2022. Many artifacts were discovered including ship anchors and pottery.
