= Marsha K. Caddle =

Barbadian politician and economist

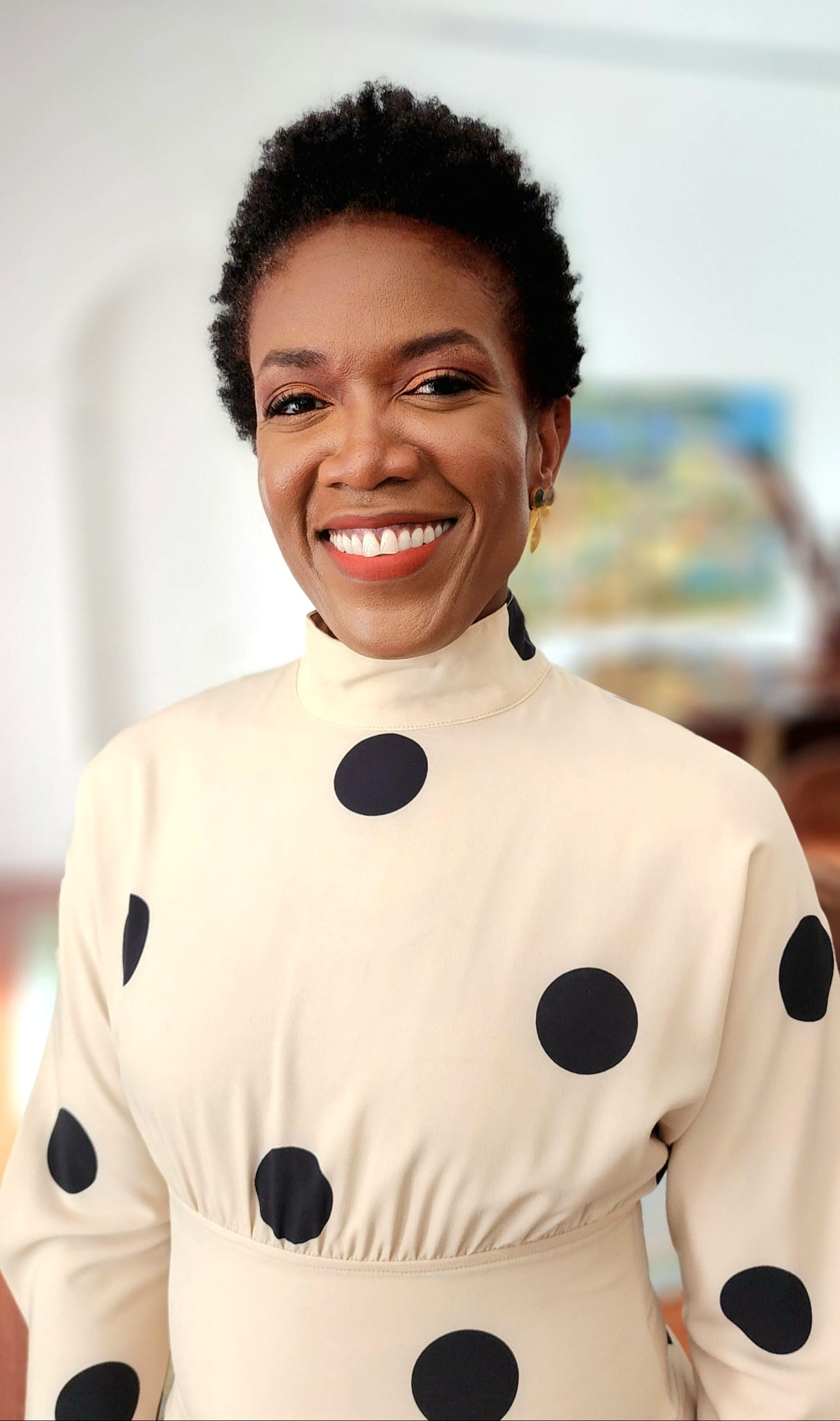
- Caddle at her Jan 2024 swearing in at Barbados State House

Minister of Industry, Innovation, Science and Technology
- Incumbent
- Assumed office 26 May 2018
- Constituency: Saint Michael South Central

Member of the House of Assembly of Barbados

Personal details
- Education: Universidad Católica Santo Domingo; University of Utah

Marsha K. Caddle is a politician and economist from Barbados, who is a Member of Parliament and the former Minister of Industry, Innovation, Science and Technology. She was also formerly Minister of Economic Affairs and Investment.

== Biography ==
Caddle grew up in Sinckler Road, Haggatt Hall in St. Michael, Barbados. She attended Belmont Primary School and for secondary education, Harrison College. She studied Economics at the Universidad Católica Santo Domingo, and subsequently moved to postgraduate study at the University of Utah. She has also worked in Poverty Analysis and Measurement with the Oxford Poverty and Human Development Initiative. In 2006 she became a member of the International Association for Feminist Economics and the International Working Group on Gender, Macroeconomics and International Economics.

Prior to her work in Parliament, Caddle held several roles in development, including as manager of the Economic Security and Rights programme of the United Nations Development Fund for Women Caribbean Office. She subsequently worked as Programme Manager, Poverty and Economic Security with the United Nations Development Programme (UNDP) and as governance strategy manager for the Caribbean Development Bank.

A member of the Barbados Labour Party, Caddle is the Member of Parliament for the St Michael South Central constituency. She was first elected to parliament on 26 May 2018 Barbados general election, unseating the then Tourism Minister Richard Sealy. She defeated Sealy a second time in 2022, returning to Parliament for a second term.

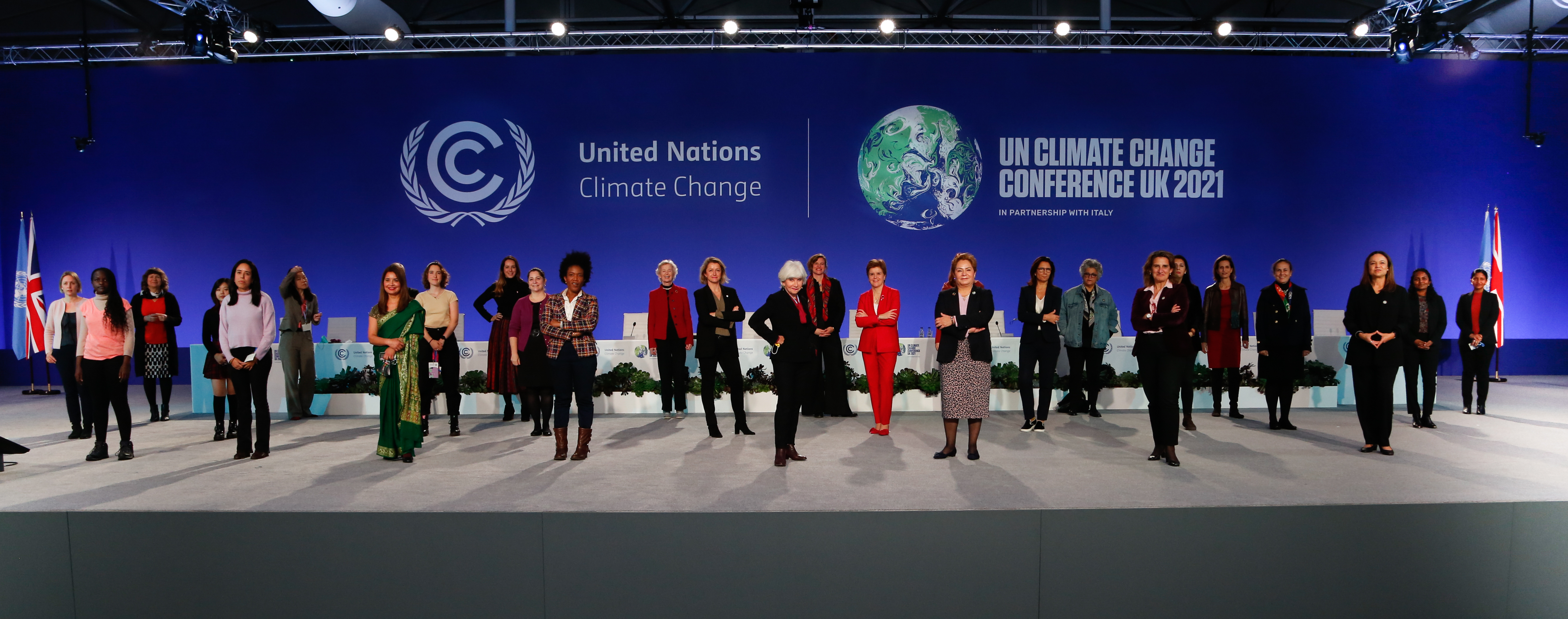
Women World Leaders at COP26

In 2021 Caddle led the delegation from Barbados to the COP 26 conference, since her then ministerial role led on climate crisis and climate finance. For Barbados, rising temperatures means increasingly severe weather, including hurricanes and drought. She has been outspoken about how the main driver of debt for Caribbean countries is the effect of the climate crisis.

On February 25 2025, Caddle handed in her resignation from the Barbados Labour Party Cabinet, citing differences in principles.

She contested the February 2026 election, winning her seat for a third time, and was then reappointed to the Barbados Labour Party Cabinet as Minister for Economic Affairs and Planning.

== Personal life ==
Caddle married Dr. Abdul Mohamed in June 2021.
