= Margarita Luna de Espaillat =

Dominican Republic composer, pianist, and organist

Margarita Luna de Espaillat (July 31, 1921 – 2016) was a composer, pianist, and organist from the Dominican Republic.

Born in Santiago de los Caballeros, Luna de Espaillat began her studies under Juan Francisco García; later instructors included Manuel Antonio Rueda González, with whom she studied piano; Juan Urteaga, with whom she studied organ; and Manuel Simó, with whom she studied harmony, counterpoint, and fugue. From 1964 until 1967 she was a pupil of Hall Overton at the Juilliard School. For many years she was director of the National Conservatory of Music in the Dominican Republic. During her career Luna de Espaillat composed an oratorio, Vigilia eterna, and Elegie for choir, narrator, and orchestra, as well as chamber music and piano works. She also taught music history and theory. Her Cambiantes, which dates to 1969, is held to be the first dodecaphonic composition written by a Dominican composer.

Luna de Espaillat was married to businessman Víctor Espaillat Mera (a first cousin of First Lady Asela Mera and 3x-great-grandson of Francisco Espaillat), with whom she had three children, Víctor Manuel, Carmen, and Pilar Espaillat Luna. She died in Canada, where she had lived for over twenty years.
