= National Youth Awards (Dominican Republic) =

Dominican civilian award

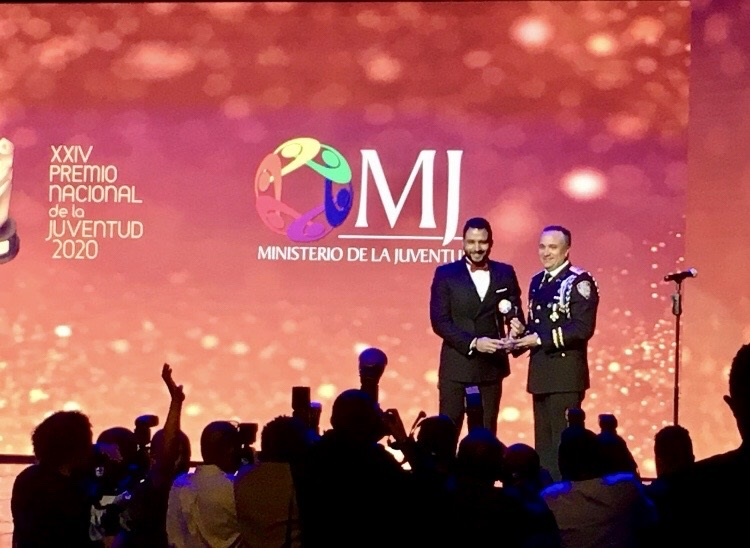
The National Youth Award being handed to Geovanny Vicente.

The National Youth Award (Spanish: Premio Nacional de la Juventud or PNJ) is conferred annually by the Youth Ministry of the Government of the Dominican Republic. Awards are presented annually at a gala that is held on January 31st, which is National Youth Day in the Dominican Republic.

Award recipients can be between the ages of 15 and 35 years old.

== Previous recipients ==
- Amelia Vega (2003), Miss Universe 2003
- Joan Guzmán (2007), boxer
- Al Horford (2010), basketball player
- Dr. Kathleen Martínez (2010), archaeologist
- Aisha Syed Castro, violinist (2015)
- Gloria Reyes, politician (2018)
- Geovanny Vicente (2020)
