= Rafael Bello =

Dominican television and radio personality based in New York City

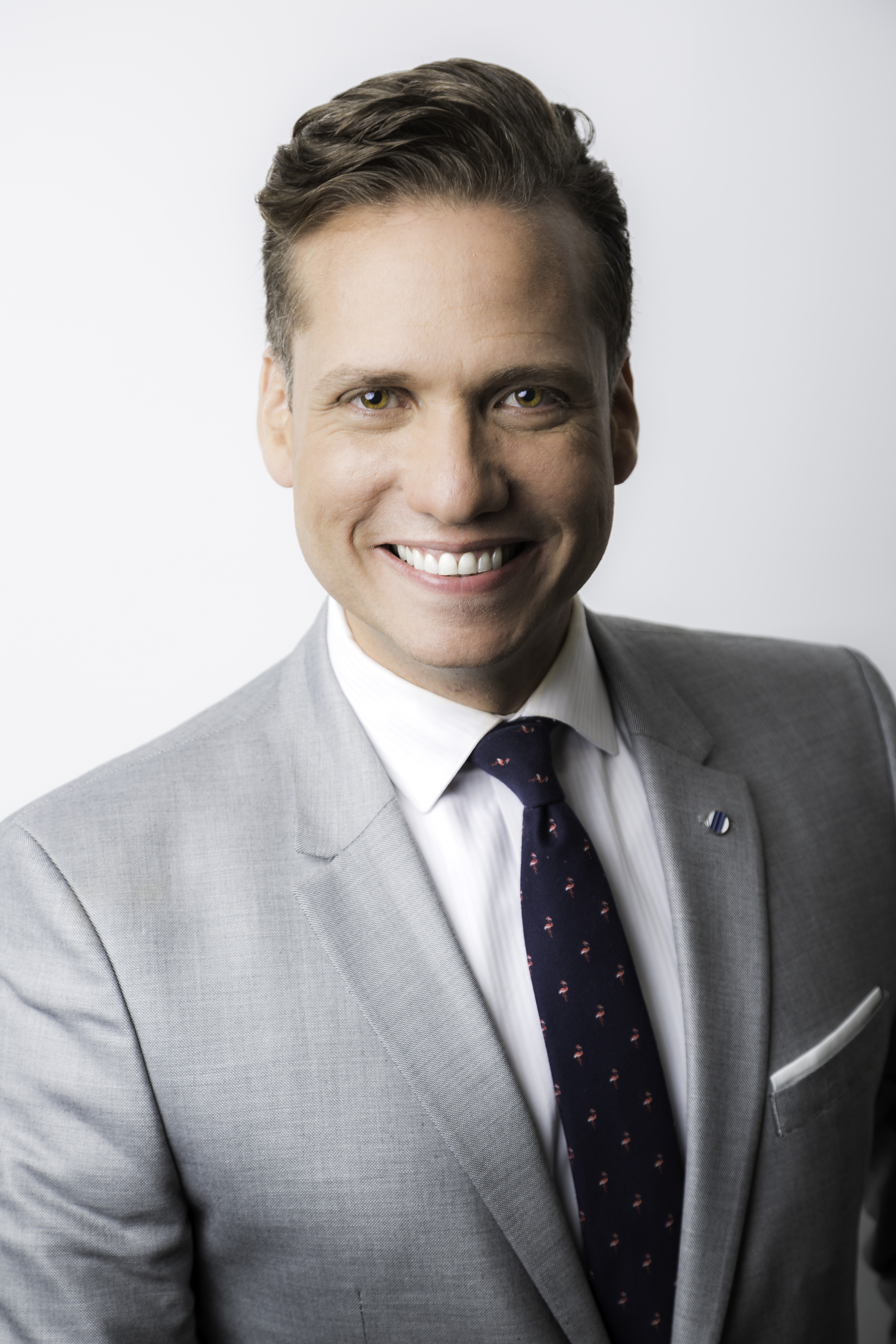
Rafael Bello, TV Anchor

Rafael Bello (pronounced Rafael BE-YO), is a Dominican television and radio personality based in New York City. Bello, a five-time Emmy award winner, who served as the News Anchor for Noticias Univisión 41 "Al Despertar", WXTV-DT, Univision 41 New York, now hosts his own The Rafael Bello Show on YouTube. Bello was the former early morning and midday anchor. Bello was also the host and Executive Producer of his sports radio show "El Locker Room 1050 con Rafael Bello" on 1050 AM ESPN Deportes Radio New York; but after ESPN closed all Spanish stations across the cUS, bello turned his show into "Desde las Gradas Podcast" on YouTube. Bello formerly served as the traffic and entertainment anchor on WNJU Telemundo 47 in "Noticiero 47 Primera Edicion" and also hosted feature and entertainment segments including his Emmy Award winner for best entertainment segment under the name "Pa la Calle con Rafa".

For almost three years, Bello was weekend sports anchor for "Noticiero 47 Fin de Semana", for which he was nominated as Best Sports Anchor in the 57th edition of the New York Emmy Awards.

== Early life ==
Bello was born and raised in Santo Domingo, Dominican Republic. In 2011 he immigrated to the United States, the same year he started his journey with the Telemundo 47 news team.

== Professional background ==
=== Radio journalism ===
Bello started his journalism career in 2003 producing and hosting the sports segment called "Carril Deportivo" in "Carril del Medio" radio show, produced and anchored by journalists Deidamia Galan and Rosa Amarela, which was broadcast nationwide in the Dominican Republic.

After several years Bello decided to develop his own project and started "Desde las Gradas" in 2006, an interactive sports talk show, produced and hosted by Bello, joined by several journalists such as late Ivan Brea, a 30+ years of experience sports journalist and the first basketball specialized analyst in the Dominican Republic. Bello lead a team completed by Jorge de Leon, Jose Anibal Duran, Carlos Sanchez, Roxy Bonilla, Javier Guerrero, Joan Berrido, Jorge Allen Bauger, Fernando Gomez, Milton Diaz, Aquiles Ramirez, Jordan Olivo, Antonio Silva Puesán, Dorian Diaz and more.

In 2010, Bello joined the official MLB broadcasts in the Dominican Republic, rights hold by Cadena de Noticias (CDN), and was a commentator for the MLB season games, a nationwide broadcast on CDN La Radio.

After moving to the United States, Bello re-joined the Licey Tigers International Broadcast as the commentator for the 2011–2012 season.

In 2015, Bello joined 1050 AM ESPN Deportes Radio as the first talent in New York and currently produces and hosts his weekend show called "El Locker Room 1050 con Rafael Bello", along with urban music producer Berardo Mendez and Philanthropist and Entrepreneur, Roberto Clemente Jr.

Bello also produces segments for WADO 1280, a radio station property of Univision Communications.

=== Television journalism ===
In 2006, Bello started as a commentator for the Licey TV broadcasts of the Dominican Summer League games, the minor league circuit of the Major League Baseball in the Dominican Republic. He also served as a commentator for the "Circuito Internacional" of the Licey Tigers, international broadcast of Licey, a professional team of the Dominican Professional Baseball League (LIDOM), until 2010.

In 2009, Bello joined "Noticias SIN" with Emmy award winners Alicia Ortega and Fernando Hasbun; one of the top two newscasts in the country. Bello was the prime-time newscast (11 pm) sports anchor and anchored sports also for the newly born "Noticias SIN y Algo Más", a news and variety show aired at 7:00 pm, now at 9:00 in the evening.

Early in 2010, Bello was named the host of the National Basketball League (LNB, previously known as LIDOBA) television broadcasts, in the first season of the new brand and TV crew. Bello was the anchor for all the games and also served as a commentator and commercial voice, also joined by Romeo Gonzalez, Ricardo Rodriguez and Roxy Bonilla.

During the same year, Bello was co-anchor and co-producer of "La Hora Roja", a pre-game show of the Leones del Escogido, a professional team of the Dominican Baseball League.

In September 2011, Bello joined WNJU Telemundo 47 as the sports anchor of the weekend newscast and feature segment reporter. Later in 2014 he became Traffic & Entertainment reporter for Noticiero Primera Edicion and hosted Acceso Total along with Victoria Sosa.

In 2016, Bello joined Univision 41 New York, as Weather and Entertainment Anchor.

In December 2021, Rafael Bello became the Early Morning and Midday News Anchor at Univision 41 after 5 years of weather experience. Lucrecia Borchardt replaced Rafael Bello as the meteorologist for the "Al Despertar" y "Edicion Digital Nueva York" newscasts and El Tiempo in New York City became Los Guardianes del Tiempo alongside Jesus Lopez, another related meteorologist, and Lucrecia herself.

=== Print and online journalism ===
From 2008 Bello started writing his column called "Como Lo Veo Desde las Gradas" (How I See It From The Stands), for the online version of El Caribe Newspaper, in which he wrote on a selected sports topic.
He wrote the front page of the Sports section featuring Super Bowl XLII between the New York Giants and the New England Patriots with pre-game analysis of both teams.
Bello also covered the 2009 Fiba Americas Qualifier Tournament in San Juan Puerto Rico, posting multiple articles every day about the games, interviews and analysis.

== Honors and awards ==
- 2023 New York Emmy Awards winner as Best News Anchor - Talent, along with 5 nominations
- 2019 New York Emmy Awards winner as Weather Anchor of the Best Newscast - Larger Markets, along with 5 nominations
- 2018 New York Emmy Awards winner as Weather Anchor of the Breaking News covering Hurricane Maria, along with 4 nominations
- 2013 New York Emmy Awards winner for Best Program Feature/Segment for "Pa' la Calle con Rafa".
- 2013 New York Emmy Awards winner for Best Newscast. (News Reporter)
- 2013 New York Emmy Awards nomination for Best Sports Anchor.
- 2012 New York Emmy Awards nomination for Best Newscast.
- 2013 Received a Special Citation from New York City Council Member Julissa Ferreras for "exemplary service to his community". The citation referred to him as "an outstanding citizen, one who is worthy of the esteem of both community and the great City of New York".
- 2015 New York Emmy Awards Bello received two nomination for Best Newscast as Entertainment & Traffic Anchor.
