= Álvaro Manzano =

Ecuadorian conductor (1955–2022)

- Born: Álvaro Manzano Montero; 1955; Ambato, Ecuador
- Died: 19 February 2022 (aged 66)
- Education: Moscow Conservatory
- Occupation: Conductor
- Awards: Premio Eugenio Espejo (2020)

Álvaro Manzano Montero (1955 – 19 February 2022) was an Ecuadorian opera and symphony orchestra conductor.

== Biography ==
Manzano was born in 1955 in Ambato where he began his musical studies. In 1975, he went to Moscow, where in 1979 he obtained his Choral Conductor degree from the Tchaikovsky School. In 1985, he graduated cum laude from the P.I. Tchaikovsky Moscow State Conservatory, in the class of conductor Gennady Rozhdestvensky.

From 1985 to 2001 and from 2006 until 2020, he was Principal Conductor of the National Symphony Orchestra of Ecuador. From 2001 to 2004 and from 2007 to 2009, he was music director and Principal of the National Symphony Orchestra of the Dominican Republic. Manzano conducted symphony orchestras in Argentina, Bolivia, Brazil, Chile, Colombia, Costa Rica, Cuba, El Salvador, United States, Estonia, Guatemala, Honduras, Iceland, Mexico, Paraguay, Peru, Russia and Venezuela. He was the Musical and artistic director of the Sucre National Theater in Quito and a teacher at important conservatories in Ecuador and the Dominican Republic.

He died on 19 February 2022, at the age of 66.

== Awards ==
- Honorary Citizen, Louisville, Kentucky, United States, 1987.
- Outstanding Young Man of the World, Helsinki, Finland, 1991.
- Order of Rio Branco, Presidency of Brazil, 1994.
- Premio Eugenio Espejo, in the category Creations, Achievements or Activities in area of Culture and the Arts, conferred by the president of Ecuador, September 2020.
