= Richard Sealy =

Barbadian politician

Minister of Tourism and International Transport

Member of the House of Assembly of Barbados
- Constituency: St Michael South Central

Personal details
- Education: University of Florida; University of the West Indies

Richard L. Sealy is a Barbadian politician who was Deputy Prime Minister and Minister of Tourism and International Transport in the Cabinet of Barbados from 23 October 2010 to 25 May 2018 He was replaced by Marsha K. Caddle. He is also the Chairperson of the Democratic Labour Party Member of the House of Assembly of Barbados for the St Michael South Central constituency.

He graduated with a BSc in civil engineering from the University of Florida at completed an MBA at the University of the West Indies (Cave Hill Campus).
