= Eduardo Brito National Theater =

Theatre in Santo Domingo, Dominican Republic

Teatro Nacional Eduardo Brito
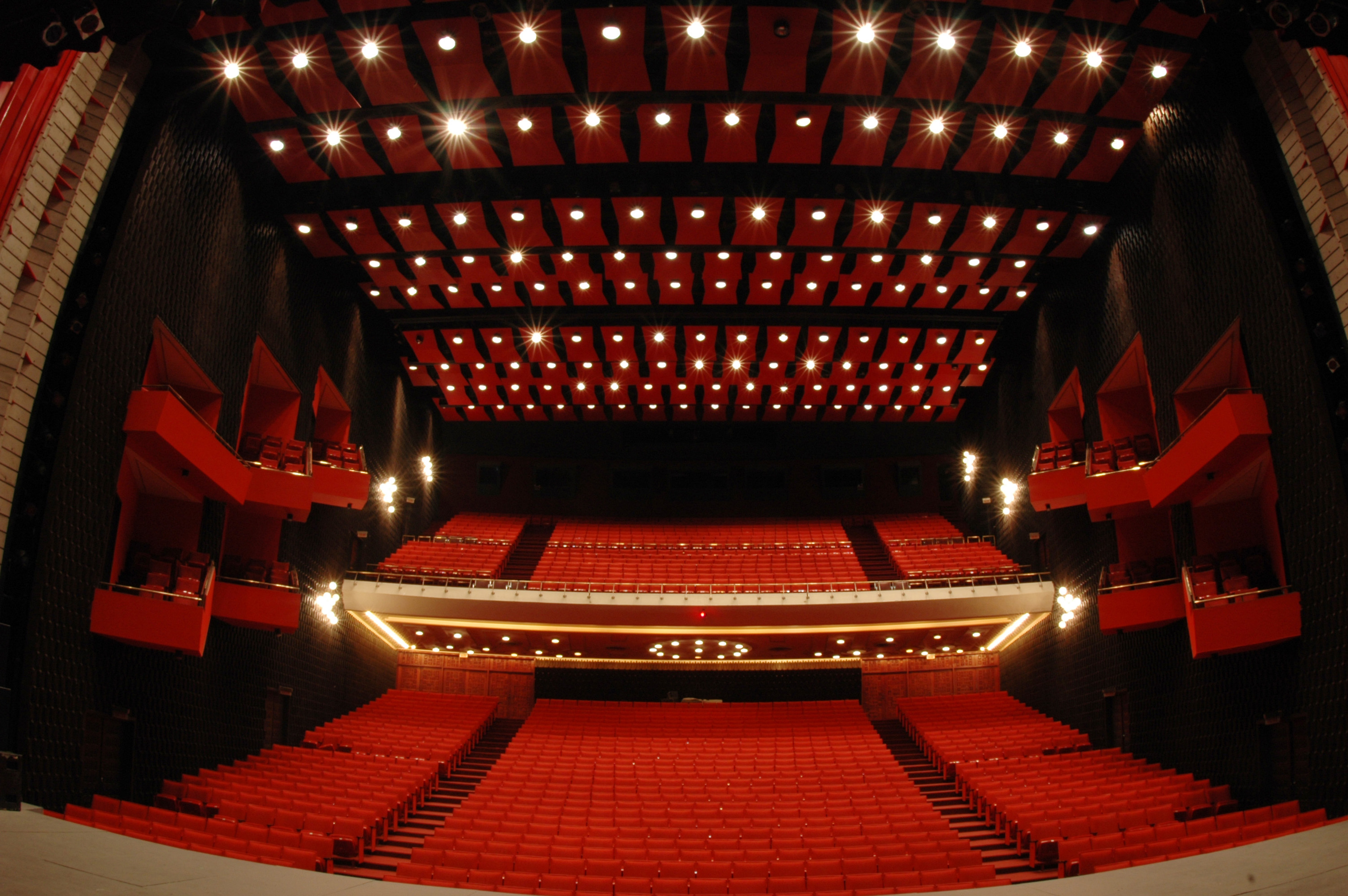
- Sala Carlos Piantini
- Interactive map of Teatro Nacional Eduardo Brito
- Address: Santo Domingo; Dominican Republic
- Coordinates: 18°28′14″N 69°54′39″W
- Capacity: 1600

Construction
- Opened: August 16, 1973; 53 years ago

Website
- teatronacional.gob.do

Eduardo Brito National Theater (Spanish: Teatro Nacional Eduardo Brito) is a venue in Santo Domingo, Dominican Republic. The centerpiece of the Plaza de la Cultura (Culture Plaza) complex, it regularly hosts opera, ballet, classical music performances, and Latin pop concerts. The national theatre opened on August 16, 1973, and was originally known as the National Theater of Santo Domingo. In 2006, it was renamed after the Dominican baritone Eduardo Brito by presidential decree. It has a capacity of 1,700 seats.

== History ==
In 1970, then-president Joaquín Balaguer selected architect Teófilo Carbonell to design a world-class theater. Carbonell traveled across Europe and the Americas before developing his design, which evokes the Metropolitan Opera House in New York while using Dominican materials including marble, mahogany, and onyx.

After conducting the National Symphony at the National Theater in 1995, French pianist and conductor Philippe Entremont proposed holding a recurring music festival there. First held in 1997 featuring pianists such as André Watts and José Feghali, the Santo Domingo Music Festival is hosted biennially at the National Theater.

In 2011, the National Theatre's Hall of Culture was named the Aída Bonnelly de Díaz Hall (Sala Aída Bonnelly de Díaz). The hall had been established by Aida Bonnelly de Diaz during her second turn as artistic director of the theater.

On 16 August 2024, the Eduardo Brito National Theater was the venue of the swearing-in ceremony for President Luis Abinader, attended by 17 heads of state and other international delegations. It was the first time that the presidential inauguration ceremony was held at a location other than the Assembly Hall of the National Congress.

In 2025, the theater hosted a memorial service for merengue singer Rubby Pérez, who died in the Jet Set nightclub roof collapse on 8 April.

== See also ==
- List of concert halls

Preceded by Lee Theatre; British Hong Kong	Miss Universe venue 1977	Succeeded by Acapulco Convension Center (Mexico) Acapulco
