= Tomb of Antony and Cleopatra =

Undiscovered burial crypt of Mark Antony and Cleopatra VII

The former Roman triumvir Mark Antony and Egyptian queen Cleopatra VII were buried together after their deaths in 30 BC; their tomb has not been discovered, and is assumed to be located in Alexandria, Egypt.

According to historians Suetonius and Plutarch, the Roman leader Octavian permitted their burial together after he had defeated them. Their surviving children were taken to Rome, to be raised as Roman citizens. The Egyptian Ministry of Tourism and Antiquities theorizes that it is within or near a temple of Taposiris Magna, southwest of Alexandria.

== Historical sources ==
Throughout history many references to the tomb of Antony and Cleopatra have been made.

=== Primary source location ===
Plutarch places the tomb near a Temple of Isis. Plutarch and Cassius Dio describe Cleopatra VII moving between her palace and the tomb in her last days. Strabo and John of Nikiû place her palace on the island of Antirhodos. Plutarch and Suetonius say that Augustus completed the unfinished tomb and buried Cleopatra VII and Marc Antony together in regal fashion. Cassius Dio mentions about the mausoleum that "the upper part of it next to the roof was not yet fully completed" at the time of Cleopatra's death and that Cleopatra and Anthony "were both embalmed in the same fashion and buried in the same tomb".

Archaeologist Franck Goddio has spent 25 years performing a geophysical survey of the bay of Alexandria, revealing many Ptolemaic structures which reside under at least 16 feet of water, some under another 16 feet or more of sediment. He has identified the submerged island of Antirhodos along with remains of a palace that contains artifacts from the reign of Cleopatra VII and an Isis temple. Currently, only this temple of Isis has been located in Alexandria.

Goddio assumes Cleopatra VII's mausoleum to be located on the submerged Antirhodos Island between the palace and the Isis temple.

== In fiction ==
=== Shakespeare's Antony and Cleopatra ===
William Shakespeare, inspired by Plutarch, briefly alludes to this common entombment in the voice of his character Caesar (Octavian), in the last verses of his play Antony and Cleopatra (Act V, scene II):

She shall be buried by her Antony
No grave upon the earth shall clip in it
A pair so famous.

== Exploration and discovery efforts ==
Many searches for the tomb of Antony and Cleopatra have taken place.

=== Taposiris Magna excavation ===
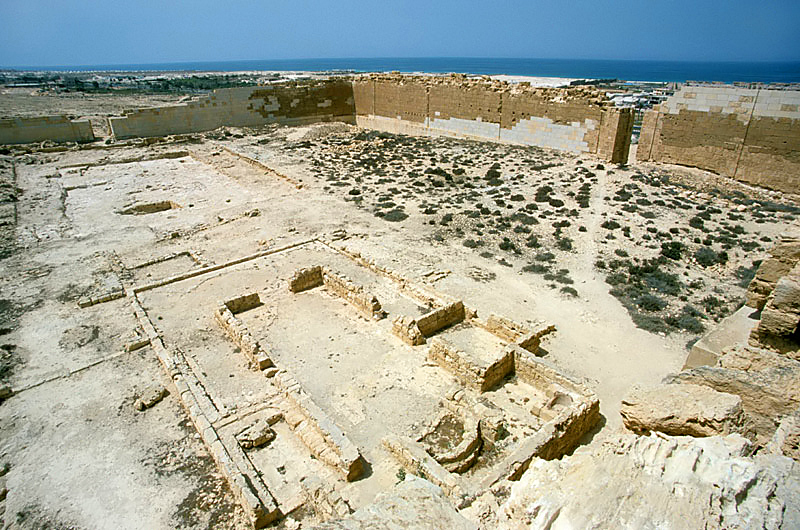
Courtyard in the Temple of Osiris, Abu Sir (Taposiris magna), Egypt in 2003

Excavations aimed at finding Cleopatra's tomb has been carried out by Kathleen Martínez in Taposiris Magna, a temple to Osiris, located west of Alexandria, Egypt. Martinez believes that Cleopatra was originally buried by Octavian in Alexandria, as historical records suggest, but "after the mummification process was complete, the priests at Taposiris Magna buried the bodies of Cleopatra and Mark Antony in a different place without the approval of the Romans". For her reasoning that the resting place lays in Taposiris Magna, Martinez cites its dedication to Osiris:

What brought me to the conclusion that Taposiris Magna was a possible place for Cleopatra's hidden tomb was the idea that her death was a ritual act of deep religious significance carried out in a very strict, spiritualized ceremony. ... Cleopatra negotiated with Octavian to allow her to bury Mark Antony in Egypt. She wanted to be buried with him because she wanted to reenact the legend of Isis and Osiris. The true meaning of the cult of Osiris is that it grants immortality. After their deaths, the gods would allow Cleopatra to live with Antony in another form of existence, so they would have eternal life together.

— Kathleen Martinez

The finding from late 2000s include ten mummies in 27 tombs of Egyptian nobles, as well as coins bearing images of Cleopatra and carvings showing the two people in an embrace. So far, the tomb itself remains elusive, but the temple excavations continue, with additional sites below the surface identified using ground-penetrating radar in 2011.

In January 2019, controversy arose over the possibility that the discovery of the tombs was imminent, attributed to remarks by Zahi Hawass at a conference at the University of Palermo. The Egyptologist denied the news in an article in the newspaper Al-Ahram, affirming that the thesis that the tombs were in Taposiris Magna was not his but that of Kathleen Martínez, and that "the temples were for worshiping, and this was for the goddess Isis. It is therefore unlikely that Cleopatra was buried there"; he also claimed that he did not believe Martínez's hypothesis because "the Egyptians never buried inside a temple". The last statement is contradicted by the fact that burials of some pharaohs - for example rulers of 21st and 22nd Dynasty buried in Tanis, and of ephemeral king Harsiese - were indeed located inside a temple's enclosure or in its close vicinity.

In early November 2022 the team of archaeologists led by Martínez identified a 1,300 m (4,300 ft) long tunnel in the area of the temple of Taposiris Magna, west of Alexandria, that could lead to Cleopatra's tomb.

The search seeks to find Antony's mummy as well, despite Plutarch's observation that Antony was cremated: "After Cleopatra had heard this, in the first place, she begged Octavian that she might be permitted to pour libations for Antony; and when the request was granted, she had herself carried to the tomb, and embracing the urn which held his ashes."

== Tomb contents ==
It is likely that the tomb contains nothing besides human remains.

When Octavian approached Alexandria, Cleopatra VII retreated to her tomb:

...she had a tomb and monument built surpassingly lofty and beautiful, which she had erected near the temple of Isis, collected there the most valuable of the royal treasures, gold, silver, emeralds, pearls, ebony, ivory, and cinnamon; and besides all this she put there great quantities of torch-wood and tow, so that Caesar [Octavian] was anxious about the reason, and fearing lest the woman might become desperate and burn up and destroy this wealth...

— Plutarch, The Life of Antony

Octavian had no intention of leaving it there:

Now Caesar was anxious not only to get possession of her treasures but also to seize her alive and to carry her back for his triumph...

— Cassius Dio, Roman History

Romans eventually gained access to the tomb (Plutarch, Cassius Dio), and Octavian obtained the treasure:

So much for these events. In the palace quantities of treasure were found. For Cleopatra had taken practically all the offerings from even the holiest shrines and so helped the Romans swell their spoils without incurring any defilement on their own part. Large sums were also obtained from every man against whom any charge of misdemeanour were brought. And apart from these, all the rest, even though no particular complaint could be lodged against them, had two-thirds of their property demanded of them. Out of this wealth all the troops received what was owing them, and those who were with Caesar [Octavian] at the time got in addition a thousand sesterces on condition of not plundering the city. Repayment was made in full to those who had previously advanced loans, and to both the senators and the knights who had taken part in the war large sums were given. In fine, the Roman empire was enriched and its temples adorned.

— Cassius Dio, Roman History

== See also ==
- Early life of Cleopatra
- Reign of Cleopatra
- Death of Cleopatra
