= Steve Farmer =

Steve Farmer may refer to:

- Steve Farmer (darts player) (born 1965), English darts player
- Steve Farmer (musician) (1948–2020), American guitarist and composer
