= José Antonio Molina =

Dominican conductor, pianist and composer

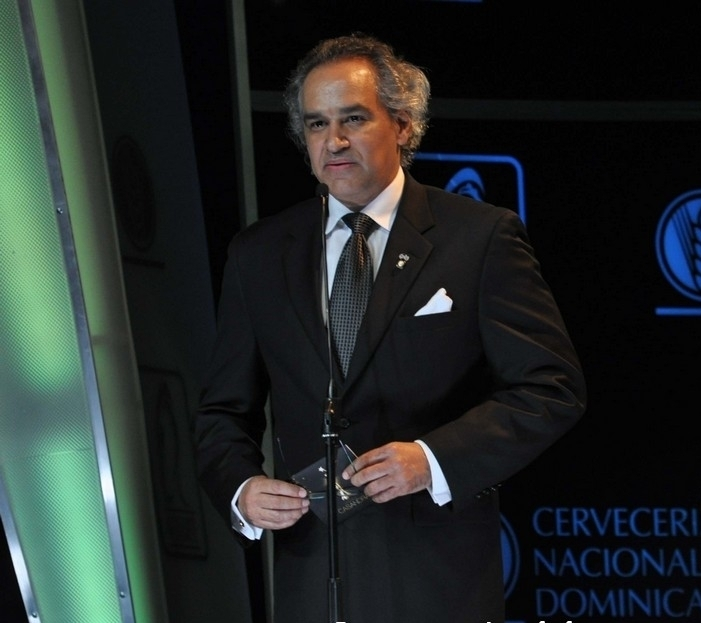
- José Antonio Molina, 2010.
- Born: José Antonio Molina Miniño; April 5, 1960 (age 66); Santo Domingo, Dominican Republic
- Occupations: Musician; composer; conductor
- Years active: 1980–present

José Antonio Molina Miniño (born June 4, 1960 in Santo Domingo) is a Dominican conductor, pianist and composer.

== Early life and education ==
Molina studied piano at the Conservatorio Nacional de Música with Vicente Grisolía. In 1980, he moved to New York and earned a Bachelor's and Master's degree from the Manhattan School of Music (1984 and 1985). At the same time, he studied composition and conducting at the Juilliard School of Music.

== Musical career ==
In 1984 he made his debut as a pianist with the Orquesta Sinfónica Nacional de la República Dominicana conducted by Julio de Windt with Edvard Grieg's Piano Concerto. In the same year he led the New York Lab Orchestra at the premiere of his Etudes For Orchestra. In 1986 he conducted the Venezuelan Orquesta Sinfónica de Maracaibo in a Gershwin program. For the 16th anniversary of the establishment of the Teatro Nacional de la República Dominicana, he conducted the world premiere of his merengue fantasía for orchestra. This was used for the Festival of Modern Dance in 1990 as music for a ballet performance conducted by Eduardo Villanueva.

During a trip to Cuba in 1991, Molina directed the Orquesta Sinfónica de Matanzas and the Orquesta Sinfónica Nacional de Cuba and conducted a performance of the opera Cavalleria rusticana in Havana at the end of the year. For the 50th anniversary of Pope John Paul II's ordination in 1995, Molina ran a program with Gloria Estefan. From 1996 he was conductor and arranger of the programs Pavarotti and friends.

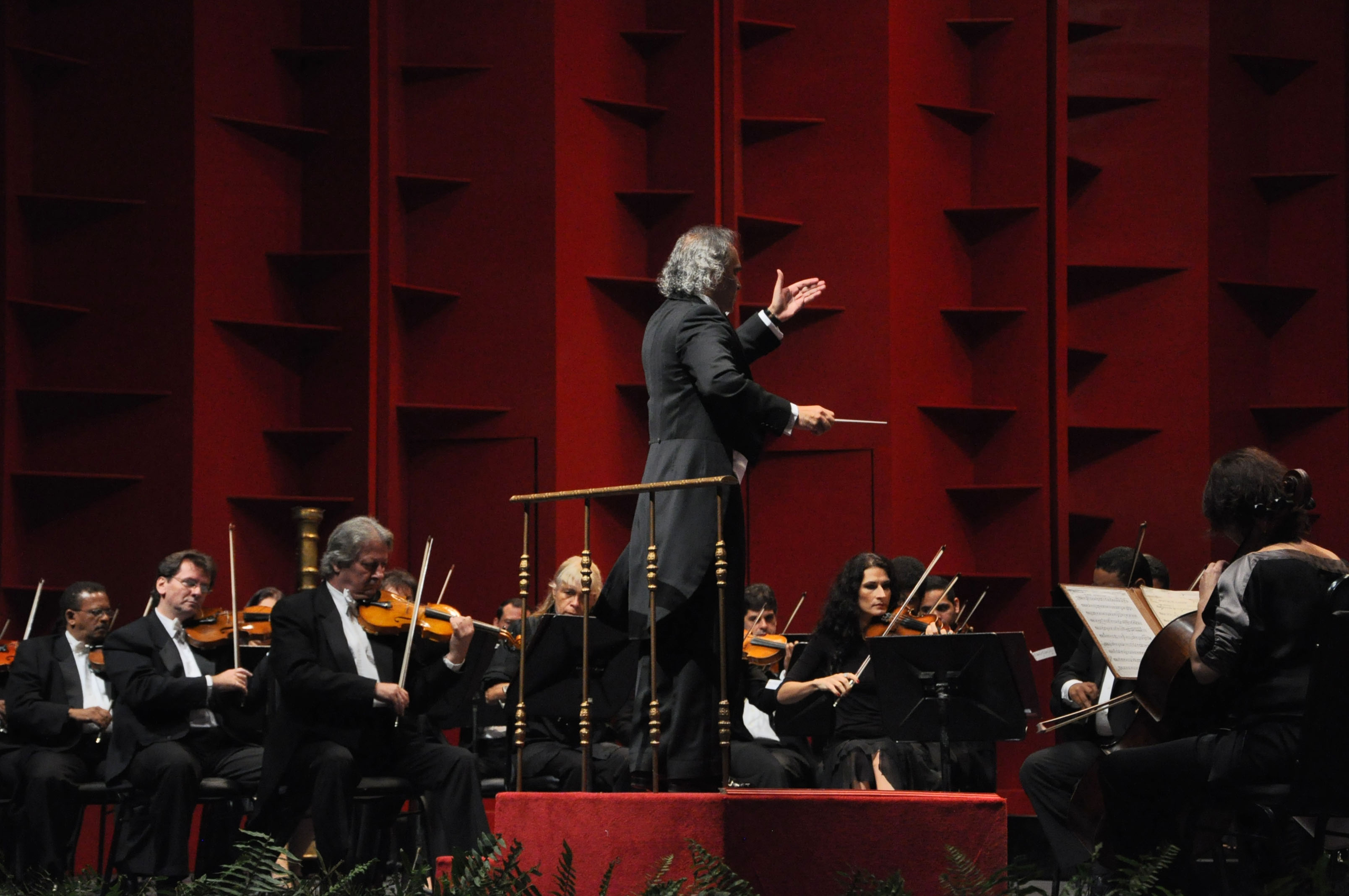

In 1996, Molina became Principal Conductor of the Greater Palm Beach Symphony, with whom he participated in the Blowing Rock and Sun Fest Florida Music Festivals. In 1997 he accompanied the singer Marilyn Horne with the orchestra at a concert. In the same year he became honorary professor of the Universidad Autónoma de Santo Domingo and cultural ambassador of the Dominican Republic. In 2001, he was awarded the Order of Mérito de Duarte, Sanchez and Mella, and in 2008 Pedro Henriquez Urena National University awarded him an honorary doctorate.

At the first Latin Caribbean Festival Leonard Slatkin conducted the world premiere of his Yaya Overture at the Kennedy Center. In 2006, Molina was invited as conductor and arranger for the program to open the Carnival Performing Arts Center in Miami. The following year, the Concert Association of Florida appointed him musical director and chief conductor of the Florida Symphony and Miami Pops Orchestra. In 2008 he became first guest conductor and in 2009 musical director of the National Symphony Orchestra of the Dominican Republic.

== See also ==
- Dominican National Symphony Orchestra
- Music of the Dominican Republic
