= Universidad Católica Santo Domingo =

University located in Santo Domingo, Dominican Republic

Coordinates: 18°27′46″N 69°55′21″W

Universidad Católica Santo Domingo (UCSD)
- Motto: Himno de la UCSD
- Type: Private
- Established: 1982; 44 years ago
- Affiliations: SEESCYT
- President: Rev. José Luis de la Cruz Sosa
- Students: 5,000
- Location: Santo Domingo, Dominican Republic
- Campus: Urban
- Nickname: UCSD " La Catolica"
- Website: ucsd.edu.do

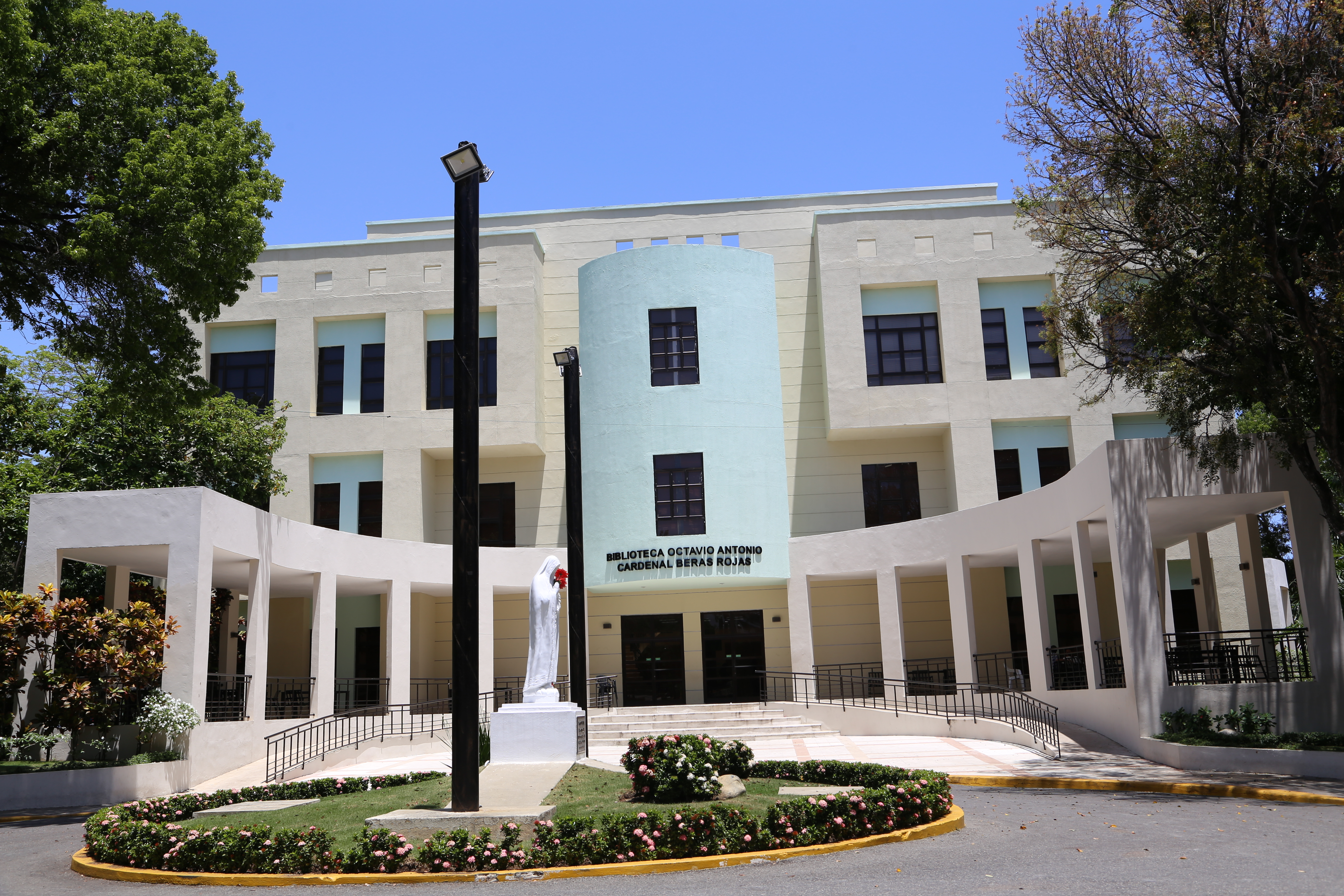
Library

Universidad Católica Santo Domingo ("Santo Domingo Catholic University"; acronym, UCSD; also known as La Católica) is a private Catholic university located in the archdiocese of Santo Domingo, in the Dominican Republic. The university was established in 1982, with 65 students entering the school in the following year.

The university has a student body of 5,000 students with 250 faculty members. It is commonly known as "La Católica", and its population is mostly middle-class students, who work and study full-time, and pay their own tuition.

Faculties:

- Diplomacy and International Relations;
- Odontology or Dentistry;
- Engineering system;
- Architecture;
- Economics;
- Psychology;
- Faculty of Law;
- Tourism;
- Social communication;
- Administration;
- Physiotherapy,
- Marketing.

The university sports department has a soccer team with Prof. Jaime Paez as head coach, Lendz Heriveaux as coach assistant and Serge Junior Fecu as captain. There are basketball and volleyball teams. Both Futsal and regular soccer are played.

== History ==
In February 2025, the university signed an inter-institutional collaboration agreement with the government Ministry of Public Health.

== Notable alumni ==
- Marsha K. Caddle, Politician and economist
- Jonathan Delgado, Diplomat and lawyer
