= National Symphony Orchestra (Dominican Republic) =

National Symphony Orchestra (Orquesta Sinfónica Nacional)
- Orchestra
- Founded: 1941
- Location: Santo Domingo, Dominican Republic
- Principal conductor: José Antonio Molina
- Website: www.sinfonia.org.do

The National Symphony Orchestra of the Dominican Republic (Orquesta Sinfónica Nacional) is the leading classical orchestra of the Dominican Republic; it was founded in 1941.

== Background ==
The National Symphony Orchestra was officially created on August 5, 1941. Nevertheless, its history can be traced to the beginning of the 20th century, when under the initiative of Juan Bautista Alfonseca, the Octet of the Youth Casino was founded in Santo Domingo.

Since its beginning in 1904 the Octet turned into an active group, conducted by Maestro José de Jesús Ravelo, which diffused classical music. The support offered to the public was so enthusiastic that before its first year the Octet had been established as a small chamber orchestra (although it always maintained its original name) with a regular program of concerts.

After the disappearance of the Youth Casino in 1922, the Octet turned into the Concert Society Orchestra with headquarters in the Dominican Athenaeum. At the same time, in 1932, the Santo Domingo Symphony Orchestra was formed, conducted by Maestros Enrique Mejia Arredondo and Julio Alberto Hernández.

Emigration, as a consequence of the Spanish Civil War that so decisively influenced culture and arts in both sides of the Atlantic, and specially the arrival in Santo Domingo of the noteworthy Spanish musician Enrique Casal Chapí were determining factors for the transformation of the Santo Domingo Symphony Orchestra into the National Symphony Orchestra. The recently formed group was composed of musicians from the Concert Society Orchestra, the Army Music Band and the Municipal Band.

== History of the National Symphony Orchestra ==
The first conductor of the National Symphony Orchestra was Enrique Casal Chapí (1941–1945) y Enrique Mejía Arredondo, its first assistant conductor.

The following have been Principal conductors:

- Mexican Abel Eisenberg (1946–1951);
- Italian Roberto Caggiano (1951–1959);
- Dominicans Manuel Simó (1959–1980), Jacinto Gimbernard (1980–1984), Carlos Piantini (1984–1994), Rafael Villanueva (1994–1995), Julio De Windt (1995–2000);
- Alvaro Manzano from Ecuador (2001–2004), who occupied the position under the title of Musical Conductor;
- Carlos Piantini, Principal Laureate Conductor (2001 al 2006);
- Alvaro Manzano, Music Director (2007–2009).
- a Presidential Decree 245-09 dated March 20, 2009 designates maestro José Antonio Molina as Principal Conductor of the National Symphony Orchestra.

After sixty six years and more than 1,700 concerts, the National Symphony Orchestra has been the most representative Dominican musical institution. Its repertoire covers from the most important Baroque and Classic works to pieces from contemporary composers. Symphony music of Dominican composers has occupied a place of exception in its repertoire and the premiering of new works form part of its contribution to the development of Dominican music. In addition, the National Symphony Orchestra plays opera, ballet and zarzuela, in a great part of the annual productions of such genders.

Since its beginning, the National Symphony Orchestra has been integrated by Dominican musicians, as well as musicians of various nationalities, many of which have made Santo Domingo their home. The most recent history of the Orchestra is intimately linked to the Fundación Orquesta Sinfónica Nacional (Sinfonía). This private non-profit organization was founded in 1986 by Pedro Rodriguez Villacañas, who together with his wife Doña Margarita Copello de Rodriguez, actual President, gathered a distinguished group of music lovers with the purpose of helping in the consolidation and increase of the prestige of the National Symphony Orchestra. For more than two decades, “Sinfonía” has done an extraordinary work, always with the support and collaboration of the Dominican Government, together modelling the present and the future of the musical life of the Dominican Republic.

== Location ==
The orchestra performs at the Teatro Nacional Eduardo Brito in Santo Domingo.

== Music Directors ==
- Enrique Casal Chapí (1941–45)
- Abel Eisenberg (1946–51)
- Roberto Caggiano (1951–59)
- Manuel Simó (1959–80)
- Jacinto Gimbernard (1980–84)
- Carlos Piantini (1985–94)
- Rafael Villanueva (1994–95)
- Julio de Windt (1996–2000)
- Carlos Piantini (2000–06)
- Philippe Entremont (2007)
- Alvaro Manzano (2007–09)
- Jose Antonio Molina (2009– )
