= Universidad Nacional Pedro Henríquez Ureña =

Private university in the Santo Domingo, Dominican Republic

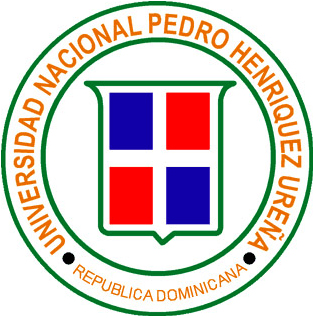
- Universidad Nacional Pedro Henríquez Ureña
- Type: Public
- Established: April 21, 1966; 60 years ago
- President: Miguel Ramón Fiallo Calderón
- Location: Campuses are located in Santo Domingo and La Vega, Dominican Republic; 18.486°N 69.949°W
- Campus: Urban
- Website: http://www.unphu.edu.do

The Universidad Nacional Pedro Henríquez Ureña (also called UNPHU) is a Private, coeducational, university in Santo Domingo, Dominican Republic.

== History ==
The University was established as a private, non profit institution on April 21, 1966, under the provisions of Law No. 273 of July 27. It was granted legal status by Government decree No.1090 of March 21, 1967. Article 2 of that decree states that the university is authorized to issue academic degrees fully accredited and recognized by the Ministry of Education.

The University regulates its academic and administrative activities under the provisions of the statutes and bylaws approved by the Board of Trustees, on December 14, 1970.

The founders of the university were luminaries with varied professional and academic backgrounds who pooled their expertise to create an organization called "Fundación Universitaria Dominicana, Inc”, which became the Board of Trustees of the University.

“Pedro Henríquez Ureña,” was chosen as the name of the university to honor the great Dominican philosopher and humanist known and respected throughout the Americas and worldwide, as a brilliant figure in the humanities.

On November 19, 1966 the University began offering classes in a State-donated building which was the former site of the Geriatric Hospital. This building, located on John F. Kennedy Avenue, was donated to the Board of Trustees by the Dominican Government. Also donated by the Dominican Government was a large parcel of land near the former Geriatric Hospital. These sites evolved into Campus I and Campus II. As Academic programs were added, the student body enrollment increased.

In the 2000s Campus I was demolished and it was sold to different companies, while Campus II became the entire university.
