= Radhames Aracena =

Radio host, music producer, businessman

- Born: Radhames Aracena; 13 May 1930; Santiago, Dominican Republic
- Died: 11 December 1999 (aged 69); Santo Domingo, Dominican Republic
- Occupations: radio host, music producer, businessman

Radhames Aracena (13 May 1930 – 11 December 1999), was a Dominican radio host, music producer and businessman who helped change the musical landscape of the Caribbean island during and after Rafael Trujillo’s dictatorship. Aracena was able to bring the traditional Dominican bachata from the brothels and saloons to every radio set in the country. Aracena created Radio Guarachita, one of the first radio stations to cater to bachata music (alongside pioneers Cuco Valoy and Jose Tabar Asilis), and subsequently began recording, producing and promoting bachata artists nationwide.

== Early life ==
When he was in his early 20s, Radhames Aracena was already making a name for himself as a popular radio personality. By 1955, while still working as a radio host, Radhames opened a record store called Discos La Guarachita (diminutive of guaracha, a popular type of Cuban music) near one of the most popular streets of Santo Domingo. He had been able to get local distribution rights for Pedro Infante’s Mexican record company, Peerless, as well as some other Latin American record labels such as Panamerica de Discos, which controlled the catalog of the famous bolero singer Lucho Gatica. A few years later, he got distribution rights for RCA and CBS.

== Radio Guarachita ==
After Trujillo’s assassination in 1961, Radhames purchased recording equipment and licenses to launch a new radio station, and in 1964 he created Radio Guarachita. Radhames, along with DJs Cuco Valoy (who later became an internationally famous salsa and merengue singer) on Radio Tropical, and Jose Tabar Asilis (popularly known as Charlie-Charlie) on La Voz del Tropico, was amongst the first to give bachata any air time.

== Producer ==
Striving to create the same sound quality for bachata as the records he was importing from overseas, Radhames began recording local musicians, and soon became one of the most important names in the bachata business. Radio Guarachita gave many legendary Dominican artists their first break. Jose Manuel Calderon, Leonardo Paniagua, Blas Duran, Ramón Cordero and Edilio Paredes, are some among the host of traditional bachateros whose careers were launched by Radhames. Many popular merengue tipico musicians, including Tatico Henriquez, Dionisia ‘Guandulito’ Mejia, and Fefita La Grande, also recorded important works with Guarachita.

== Controversy ==
The nature of the contracts that Radhames made with his artists has been subject to controversy. Their honorariums were meager; many believe that they deserved more, and there are still disagreements over royalties not being paid to family members of artists. Session musicians Edilio Paredes and Joan Soriano recall being forced to remove their shoes in the Guarachita studio (which occupied a floor of the Aracena household), and to work 12 hour shifts barefoot without being fed. Nonetheless, many artists credit their success to Guarachita, and Radhames' contribution to the Bachata scene in the Dominican Republic has made its mark on the nation's musical history.

== Death ==
Radhames Aracena died on December 11, 1999, at the age of 69, and his Radio Guarachita was closed after its heirs sold it to Dominican businessman Juan Lopez. As of 2014, 690 AM, the former frequency of Radio Guarachita in the DR, is used by ESPN radio.

== Bibliography ==
- Deborah Pacini Hernandez, Bachata: A Social History of Dominican Popular Music, Temple University Press, USA, 1995.
