= Latin percussion =

Family of musical instruments

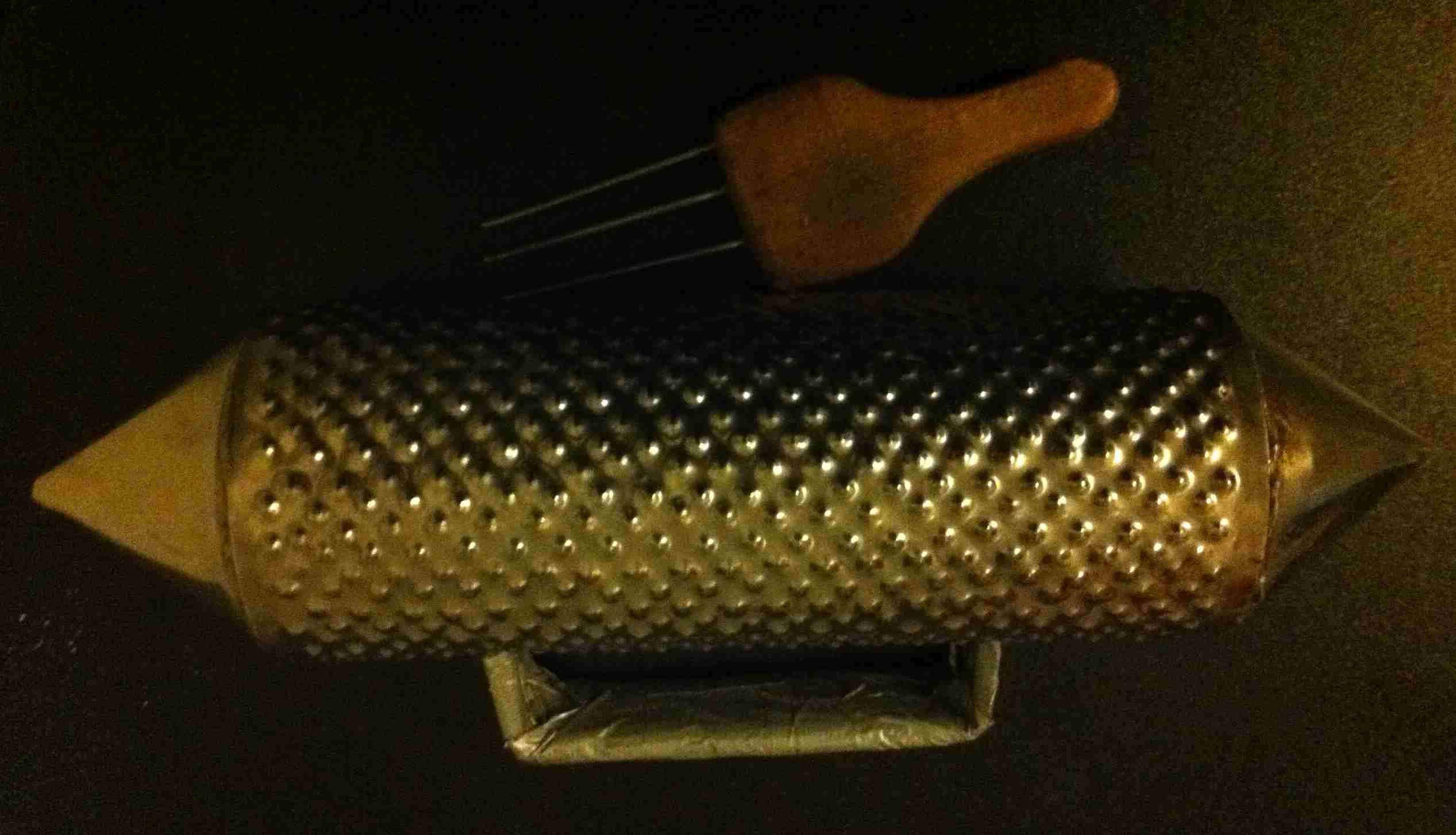
A guayo, a metal scraper used in traditional Cuban music.

Latin percussion is a family of percussion, membranophone, lamellophone and idiophone instruments used in Latin music.

== Instruments ==
=== Afro-Cuban, Puerto Rican and Dominican styles ===
==== Folkloric and Santeria ====
- Trap drums
- Abakua and Arará drums
- Chekere/Shekere
- Erikundi
- Bata
- Cowbell
- Shaker
- Conga
- Cajon
- Guiro
- Barril de bomba
- Pandereta plenera
- Cuá
- Mouth sounds

==== 20-21st century music (Salsa, Son Montuno, Bolero, etc.) ====
- Bongo
- Conga
- Clave/Wood block
- Cowbell (cencerro)
- Timbales
- Shaker/Maraca
- Güiro
- Cajón

=== South America ===
- Timbales, a similar Afro-Cuban instrument
- Surdo
- Cuíca
- Caixa
- Reco-reco
- Cabasa/Afuche
- Repinique
- Agogô
- Tan-tan
- Pandeiro
- Tamborim
- Apito
- Berimbau

==== Neo Samba and Neo-Bossa Nova additions ====
- Conga
- Timbales
- Bongo
- Clave/Wood block
- Cowbell

==== Andean styles (Peru, Bolivia, South Ecuador, Argentina, Chile) ====
- Rain Stick
- Reco-reco
- Sheep hooves, or chapchas
- Chipaya box
- Bombo
- Huancara
- Maraca

==== Coastal Peruvian and Afro-Peruvian ====
- Cajon
- Spoons
- Cajita

=== Afro-Dominican ===
==== Folkloric ====
- Various African drums
- Shaker
- Tambora
- Palo drums
- Marimbula

==== Merengue and Bacha-rengue ====
- Tambora
- Güira
- Timbales
- Conga
- Bass drum (played by Güirero)

==== Bachata ====
- Güira
- Bongo
- Conga

=== Other Caribbean & Central America ===
==== Honduran music ====
- Maracas
- Shaker
- Garawon (Drum)
- Turtle Shells
- Marimba (Afro-Central American Instrument)
- Primera Drum (Afro-Honduran Hand Drum, which creates a rattling sound when struck)
- Segunda Drum (Afro-Honduran Hand drum that creates a bass sound when struck)
- Conga
- etc.

==== Guatemalan & Salvadoran folklore ====
- Marimba
- Shaker
- Rattle
- Guiro
- Bass drum

==== Cumbia (Colombia, Mexico, etc.) ====
- Conga
- Güira and Guiro
- Maracas
- Timbales
- Wood block
- Tambora
- Cowbell
- Bongos

==== Haitian ====
- Tanbou rada
- Tanbou Petwo

==== Trinidad ====
- Dholak
- Steel drum
- Conga

==== Go-Go ====
- Conga
- Timbales
- Cowbell
- Wood block
- Bongo drum
