= Edilio Paredes =

Edilio Paredes is a Dominican guitarist and influential figure in the development of the Dominican music tradition of bachata. In a career spanning over 40 years, Paredes has arranged and recorded lead guitar on over a thousand tracks.

In the 1970s, Paredes recorded for Radhames Aracena, the owner of Radio Guarachita, the only radio station in the Dominican Republic featuring guitar music, all of which was recorded by Aracena's own labels. Being the principal arranger and guitarist of bachata during this time, Paredes's influence was significant. He was a member of the groups Super Uba and Puerto Plata. He was a part of the Bachata Roja tour with the likes of musicians Leonardo Paniagua and Joan Soriano.

In 2023, Paredes was named the 244th greatest guitarist of all time by Rolling Stone in 2023.
