= Adam Taub =

American film director

Adam Taub is a documentary film director from Greeley, Colorado, whose films include La Quinceañera, Don Angelo, and El Duque de la Bachata. His film La Quinceañera won the 2007 award for Best Documentary at the Angelus Student Film Festival in Hollywood, California, and Best Documentary at the San Diego Latino Film Festival. In 2009, he released a film project entitled El Duque de la Bachata with Joan Soriano, a bachata and merengue musician from the Dominican Republic.

== Film career ==
Don Angelo (2006) - The story of Angelo Chavez, a retired US naval officer who spends his retirement years driving to Tijuana, Mexico to help those in need.

La Quinceañera (2007) - Exploring issues of family, faith, and coming of age, La Quinceañera is a portrait of a Mexican family's love and devotion to each other.

El Duque de la Bachata (2009) - This documentary follows Dominican bachata and merengue musician Joan Soriano as he works to accomplish his dream of a hit song and fame as an artist.

== Articles and reviews ==
- Criticas Review
- Reeltalk Review
- Greeley Tribune Article
