= Radio Guarachita =

Dominican radio station

Radio Guarachita was a radio station based in Santo Domingo, Dominican Republic.

== History ==
Radio Guarachita was founded in 1964 in the Dominican Republic by bachata producer and impresario Radhames Aracena. After a year of test runs, Radio Guarachita was launched on the 690 AM frequency in 1965.

Along with DJs Cuco Valoy on Radio Tropical and Charlie-Charlie on La Voz del Tropico, Aracena and Radio Guarachita were among the first DJs to play bachata on the Dominican airwaves.

Since Radio Guarachita was on the AM frequency, it had national reach, and appealed to the rural audience of the Dominican Republic. It had interactive programs where the DJ would read listeners’ mail, and the audience also could phone in and make personal announcements at any time of day. These 24/7 public announcements encouraged listeners to tune in all day, on lookout for important news. Usually, whenever people migrated from the rural countryside to Santo Domingo in search of a family member, they would go directly to Radio Guarachita as they didn’t know their address. An announcement would be made and the family members would pick them up at the station. Guarachita became a fixture of life for a large segment of the Dominican population.

After a few years, thanks to Radio Guarachita’s success, Radhames Aracena was able to expand his business and create a recording studio in his home, open a pressing plant, and two record labels, ‘Discos Guarachita’ and ‘Zuni’ (named after his wife Zunilda.) Empresas Guarachita was a staple of the bachata industry in the Dominican Republic.

Many of the great bachata artists got their first break thanks to Radio Guarachita. These include Jose Manuel Calderon, Leonardo Paniagua, Blas Duran, Eladio Romero Santos, Edilio Paredes and Ramon Cordero. Merengue tipico artists who have collaborated with Radio Guarachita include Tatico Henriquez, Fefita La Grande, and Guandulito.

Radhames Aracena died on December 11, 1999, from an open-heart surgery complication and Radio Guarachita was sold soon after. It now lives in the memory of the Dominican people, and its influence is heard in today’s bachata.

== Bibliography ==
- Deborah Pacini Hernandez, Bachata: A Social History of Dominican Popular Music, Temple University Press, USA, 1995.
