= Vakero =

Dominican singer (born 1979)

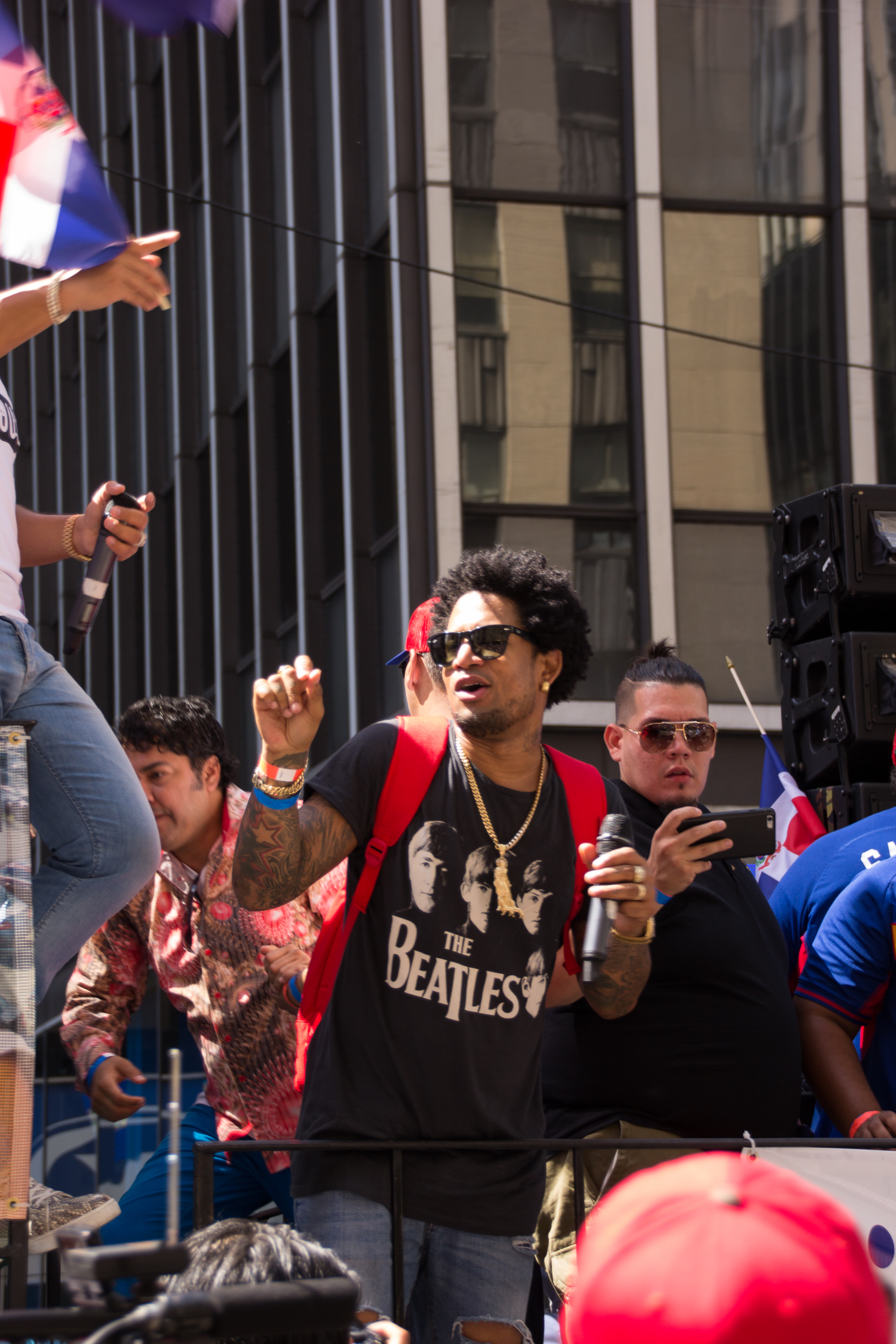
- Vakero at the Dominican Day Parade in 2015
- Born: Manuel Varet Marte; July 21, 1979 (age 47); San Pedro de Macoris, Dominican Republic
- Occupations: Singer; rapper
- Years active: 1995–present
- Children: 10
- Musical career
- Genres: Reggae; Dominican Hip Hop; Dominican Dembow; Latin Urban Music

Manuel Varet Marte (born July 21, 1979), known as Vakero, is a Dominican singer and rapper, believed to be one of the most important acts of the Dominican urban music movement and one of the first to gain international exposure. Known for blending elements of punta, cumbia and merengue with Dominican urban and dembow music, he is heavily influenced by reggae and afro-pop with his characteristic style influenced by the rastafari movement.

Marte began his musical career in 1995 as a solo act, before finding underground success as part of Dominican hip hop duo Perfecto Clan. From 2006 to 2008, Vakero was involved in a publicized feud with fellow Dominican rapper Lapiz Conciente, highlighted in the diss track, "Se Partio El Lapiz", along with his debut album "Pa ke te Mate", which gained international attention. By 2008, he was listed on Billboard's Top 5 Rising Latin Urban Act, with the track "Se Partio El Lapiz" being used as part of CSI: Miami's soundtrack.

In 2010, he gained international attention for his track "Que Mujer Tan Chula", and in 2011, he received the "Urban Artist of the Year" award from the Soberano Awards. In 2014, along with Mozart La Para and Don Miguelo, he became the first Dominican urban artist to headline at the Festival Presidente De La Musica Latina. In 2015, he released his third studio album "Yo", and in 2017, his album "Mutuacion" was released to positive reception.

== Early life ==
Manuel Varet Marte was born on July 21, 1979, in San Pedro de Macoris. His father was a tailor, and from an early age, he was interested in music, later highlighting the music of the Puerto Rican singer Hector Lavoe as particularly influential. His father's love of music inspired him as a child, with his favorite artists, and inspirations, being Héctor Lavoe, Bob Marley, Fernando Villalona, Ismael Rivera and Marino Pérez.

== Career ==
=== 1994–2006: Career beginnings ===
When Manuel was 16, he joined the group "One Play". He worked alongside Wilking for two years, before joining "Perfecto Clan, "La Rap Sonora", an urban band with more emphasis on rap. In 2005, he released his first solo project titled "Alante y Pico" and had his first local hit "Mujer Mala".

=== 2006–2009: Feud with Lapiz and Pa ke te mate ===
By 2006, Vakero was a well known name in the Dominican Hip Hop Movement, and from 2006 to 2008, he was involved in a public feud with fellow rapper, Lapiz Conciente. In 2007, he released the diss track "Se Partio El Lapiz", gaining national attention. Following that, he released the remix of the track with Arcángel, which reached international audiences. On October 25, 2007, he released his first studio album "Pa Ke Te Mate" through Jeremy Records. By early 2008, the music videos of "Se Partio El Lapiz" and "Hasta Mañana Negra Linda" were being broadcast on mun2 and mtv3.

On February 28, 2008, Vakero signed a distribution deal with Sunflower Entertainment and in September 2008, Billboard ranked him as one of the Top 5 Rising Latin Urban Acts. In the same year, the track "Se Partio El Lapiz" appeared in the soundtrack of CSI: Miami, and later on the soundtrack of Chosen Few III: The Movie. On November 18, 2008, he released his second studio album "Manuel: El Cantante de los Raperos" once again through Jeremy Records and distributed by New York-based Sunflower Entertainment.

=== 2010–2012: Que Mujer Tan Chula, marriage and Soberano Awards ===
In 2010, Vakero released the single "Que Mujer Tan Chula", which became one of the most-played tracks radio stations and nightclubs in the Dominican Republic following its release. The music video was the first Dominican urban track to gain regular rotation on HTV. He also released the EP "Ponte a Trabajar", with the titular track being featured on the Saints Row: The Third soundtrack. The same year, he married the American Latin Idol winner Martha Heredia, whilst touring New York, Europe and Venezuela.

In 2011, he received the first "Urban Artist/Band of the Year" award at the 27th Annual Soberano Awards. The same year, he released "Ay Mami" and the EP "Tu pai", with the titular song being featured in the Pro Evolution Soccer 2013 soundtrack. He then debuted as an actor with a role in the movie Lotoman, the best-selling movie of in the Dominican Republic in 2011. In 2012, he was nominated for Urban Artist of the Year at the Casandra Awards.

=== 2013–2022: Arrest, continued success, Yo and Mutuacion ===
On January 17, 2013, Vakero was arrested on domestic violence charges against his then-wife Martha Heredia, who on February 21, 2013, was arrested at the airport trying to transport heroin to New York. He was acquitted of the charges later that year. In 2014, Vakero won the "Urban Artist of the Year" award at the Soberano Awards. In the same year, he found success with the tracks "Hoy se va a Beber", "Los Zapatos" and "Demasiado" once again gaining national attention. He performed as a headline act in the 2014 Festival Presidente De La Musica Latina at the Felix Sanchez Olympic Stadium in Santo Domingo, along with Mozart La Para and Don Miguelo, becoming the first urban acts to perform at the festival. The presentation received positive reviews from local media and had an attendance of over 40,000 people.

In 2015, Vakero released his third studio album titled Yo, performing 16 shows along the east coast of the United States following the release, with the shows being sold out. In 2017, Vakero Performed at the 2017 South by Southwest Festival in Austin, Texas in front of 50,000 people.

In 2018, he released his fourth studio album, Mutuacion, which has a strong influences of reggae and afropop. The album received positive reviews from such as Vibe and Billboard, with music video for "Guateque" being ranked inside of the HTV Top 21 Hot Ranking. In the same year, his track "El Hombre Gris" was ranked in Top 11 Songs of Protest & Resistance by Latino Artists. In May 2018, he was chosen to honor Black History Month as an Afro-Latino artist.

On 27 September 2019 Vakero released his fifth album El Chulo del 23, again with influences of reggae and afropop, and with his 2013 track, "Echale Agua" and a remix of "Demasiado". In 2020, he released his sixth studio album Cosa Notra with strong hip-hop themes. In the same year, he released his first dembow song "Tu Cojea", receiving positive reviews. In 2021, his music video "Varon" was nominated for Best Music Video, however, he rejected the nomination. In 2022, he was ranked 17th by Kulture Vulutrez in the Top 25 Best Dominican Rappers.

== Discography ==
- Pa Ke Te Mate (2007)
- El Cantante de los Raperos (2008)
- Yo (2015)
- Mutuacion (2018)
- El Chulo del 23 (2019)
- Cosa Notra (2020)
- Mamá Ika (2022)
