= Louis Loizides =

Cuban musician

Louis "El Maravilloso" Loizides is one of the founders of the bachata movement in the Dominican Republic. Several of the island's most popular bachata musicians, such as Luis Vargas and Antony Santos, have labeled Louis the father of Bachata music.

Loizides has been a strong proponent of the "Power Bachata" movement, which uses a combination of the electric guitar and harpsichord. This movement never caught on, and as a result Loizides slipped from notoriety and has since retired. But many think he will make a comeback and he has started to tour several venues in the United States.

== Beginnings ==
Unlike most bachata singers, Loizides was born in Cuba. He built a raft to escape Castro's regime in the early 1960s. Originally he intended to travel towards Miami, but he had a passion for Dominican culture and set sail for the Dominican Republic. There is some dispute about this. Several sources believe that Loizides did not sail in the right direction and went towards the Dominican Republic by mistake. He settled in Puerto Plata in 1965. He worked in a local bar/brothel and learned to play the guitar for its customers in order to earn tips. While the earliest bachata recording is usually attributed to José Manuel Calderón in 1961, Loizides is considered by many to be the influential founder of the bachata movement.

== Legacy ==
Loizides is credited with the invention of several new bachata dancing patterns including the turn-style dip and cross-front return. These patterns are traditionally used on his birthday, March 11, by many notable bachateros.

In 2013 several rumors of Loizides' death circulated throughout the Bachata community in the Dominican Republic, but none of these rumors have had much credibility.

== Discography ==
=== 1975: Grande y Beautiful ===
Track list:

1. Parte Trasera
2. Cerveza
3. Spandex y Zapatos
4. La Escalera a La Cabina del DJ
5. Pasiones
6. Los Cubanos y El Dominicano
7. Mi Pequeña Balsa

=== 1985: Bragas Gato (unreleased concept album) ===
Bragas Gato
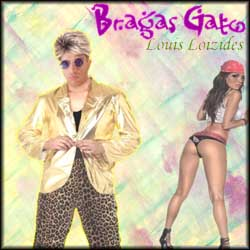

Studio album by Louis Loizides
- Released: N/A
- Recorded: 1985
- Genre: Bachata

Track list:

1. Melón Dulce
2. Guitarras y Claves

=== 1986: Cintas Rojas ===
Track list:

1. Tomates
2. Me Encanta el Accordeón
3. Gigantes de la Biblia
4. Letras no Tienen Ningún Significado
5. El Amor Físico
6. La Vena en Su Teta
7. El Muñeco
8. Tu madre
9. De Ti Me Separo
10. Much Love
