= Condena =

Condena may refer to:

- "Condena", song by José Manuel Calderón (musician) 1962
- "Condena", song by Maluma from F.A.M.E. (Maluma album) 2018
