= Quinceañera (disambiguation) =

A quinceañera is a young Latina woman's celebration of her fifteenth birthday.

Quinceañera may also refer to:

== Film ==
- Quinceañera (film), a 2006 drama
- La Quinceañera (film), a 2007 documentary

== Music ==
- "Quinceañera", a song by Timbiriche written for the 1987 telenovela

== Television ==
- Quinceañera: Mama Quiero Ser Artista (singing competition), a reality TV show broadcast by Telemundo
- Quinceañera (1987 TV series), a Mexican telenovela
- Quinceañera (upcoming TV series), an upcoming Mexican telenovela

=== Episodes ===
- "Quinceañera", an episode of the TV series Wizards of Waverly Place
- "Quinceañera", an episode of the TV series The Fosters
- "Quinceañera" (Superstore), an episode of the TV series Superstore
