= Juan Soriano =

Juan Soriano may refer to:

- Juan Soriano (artist) (1920–2006), Mexican artist
- Juan Manuel Soriano (1920–1995), Spanish voice actor
- Juan Soriano (footballer) (born 1997), Spanish footballer

== See also ==
- Joan Soriano (born 1972), Dominican musician
