= Domenic Marte =

American Bachata-pop singer-songwriter

Domenic Marte (also known as Domenic M or D. Marte) is an American singer, songwriter, and producer best known for pioneering the Bachata Pop genre. He rose to prominence in 2004 with his debut single Ven Tú, which peaked at number 7 on Billboard’s Tropical Airplay chart April 30, 2005 and remained on the chart for 34 weeks. With a career spanning over two decades, Marte has released multiple bilingual albums, blending traditional Bachata with Latin Pop and R&B influences. He has charted over 15 times on Billboard’s Tropical charts, released the first fully English Bachata album, and earned nominations from Premio Lo Nuestro and the Billboard Latin Music Awards. As of 2025, his music has streamed in over 162 countries, with more than 22 million Spotify streams for his hit Ven Tú and 27 million for his debut album Intimamente. As of 2025, Domenic Marte’s music has accumulated over 330 million streams on Spotify across all albums, including 283 million for For The World, 28 million for Intimamente, and 9.4 million for Deseos De Amarte, making him one of the most streamed independent Bachata artists in the digital era.

== Early life ==
Domenic Marte was born and raised in Lawrence, Massachusetts. His father is from the Dominican Republic, while his mother is from Puerto Rico. In 2024, Marte was honored with a key to the city and had a street named after him in Lawrence, Massachusetts, in recognition of his contributions to music and culture. Domenic Marte's professional music career began in 2004 with the release of his debut single Ven Tú, a modern Bachata track infused with romanticism and Caribbean rhythm. The song first entered the Billboard Tropical Airplay chart at number 9 in November 2004, and eventually peaked at number 7 on the April 30, 2005 chart, remaining on the chart for a total of 34 weeks. Written by Wáscar Brazobán and produced by Gio Williams, Ven Tú helped introduce Marte's bilingual Bachata-Pop sound to a global audience.Intimamente included additional singles such as “Ella Se Llevó Mi Vida,” “La Quiero,” and “Ya Que Te Vas a Ir,” receiving strong airplay across Latin Tropical, Spanish Contemporary, and Regional Mexican formats. “Ella Se Llevó Mi Vida” peaked at number 15 on the Billboard Tropical chart.

In 2007, Marte released his second studio album, Deseos De Amarte, which featured hits like “Con Los Ojos Cerrados,” “Yo Me Equivoco,” and “Ese Soy Yo.” The single “Eres Así” earned Marte a nomination for Song of the Year at the 2010 Premio Lo Nuestro awards, along with additional nominations for Best Male Artist and Traditional Tropical Artist of the Year.

In 2013, Marte released his third album, The Voice, which expanded his musical scope and featured the hit “Muero De Celos,” a duet with Luz Ríos. The track reached number 4 on Billboard’s Tropical Airplay chart and became one of the highest-charting singles of his career.

In 2015, Marte became the first Bachata artist to release a full album in English, titled For the World. The album included Bachata covers of “Pretty Woman” by Roy Orbison, “If Loving You Is Wrong” by Luther Ingram, and “Hard to Say I’m Sorry” by Chicago. The album marked a new chapter in Bachata-Pop, bridging language and genre for global reach.

In 2016, Marte continued his success independently with the 2016 album "Al Fin Libre" with the single “Como Quisiera,” which became his first No. 1 on Billboard’s Tropical Songs Airplay chart. The song also received widespread radio support, including WLZL-FM in Washington, D.C., with over 70 spins per week.The same album also had the Duet "No Ves Que Te Amo" with Brenda K Starr that peaked on the same chart at Num #10.

In 2019, Marte released the compilation album For You Vol 1, which featured the hit “Te Casarías Conmigo,” a Top 3 singles In 2019, Marte released the compilation album For You Vol 1, which featured the hit "Te Casarías Conmigo," a Top 3 single on the U.S. BDS Tropical and Spanish Contemporary charts. Another standout track, "Contaré Los Días," reached number 18 on Billboard’s Tropical Airplay chart and peaked at number 4 on BDS Tropical and number 25 on Latin Pop BDS charts.

The single “In My Eyes,” a collaboration with Stevie B, received radio support across multiple U.S. Latin radio formats and was listed among BIG MOVERS with six weeks of airplay on BDS Tropical, Latin Pop, Regional Mexican, and Latin Rhythm panels in September 2020. The song later reached #1 on MonitorLatino’s USA Tropical “Hot Song” chart, based on 356 spins from U.S. radio stations for the week of October 18–24, 2020. the U.S. BDS Tropical and Spanish Contemporary charts. Another standout track, “Contaré Los Días,” reached number 18 on Billboard’s Tropical Airplay chart and peaked at number 4 on BDS Tropical and number 25 on Latin Pop BDS charts.

Between 2020 and 2025, several of Domenic Marte’s singles also reached the number 1 position on Music Choice’s Tropicales channel, including “Por Primera Vez,” “Luchare Por Tu Amor,” “Dame De Tu Amor,” “Esposa Mia,” “Emociones,” “Tu Final,” and “Recuérdame.” These placements reflected his continued popularity on U.S. Latin radio platforms and his growing footprint in national tropical music programming.

By 2023, Marte had charted seven singles from For You Vol 1 and surpassed a milestone of over 1.1 million Spotify streams for the album. His music streamed in over 162 countries, and several tracks hit number 1 on Music Choice’s Tropical and Pop formats.

In 2023, he made history as the first U.S.-based Bachata-Pop artist to perform at Cuba’s iconic Casa de la Música in Havana, sharing the stage with Alexander Abreu y Havana D’ Primera.

As of 2025, Domenic Marte’s music has surpassed 450 million lifetime cross-platforms music interactions, reflecting sustained weekly audience engagement across Spotify, Apple Music, Pandora, Youtube, and Amazon Music across all albums. Notable totals include “For the World” 322 million, “Intimamente” with 29 million, “Deseos De Amarte” with 9.4 million, “Al Fin Libre” with 2.5 million, and “For You Vol 1” with 2.2 million streams.

== Awards and recognition ==
- Premio Lo Nuestro — Best New Tropical Solo Artist (2005)...
- Latin Pride Awards – Artist of the Year (2008)
- Multiple #1 National Tropical Songs on Music Choice’s Tropicales channel, including “Por Primera Vez,” “Luchare Por Tu Amor,” “Dame De Tu Amor,” “Esposa Mia,” “Emociones,” “Tu Final,” and “Recuérdame” (2020–2025) (2020–2025)
- Traditional Tropical Artist of the Year (2010)
- Billboard Latin Music Awards – Artist of the Year (2005)
- Latin Pride Awards – Artist of the Year (2008)
- City Proclamation Award – Mayor of Lawrence, Massachusetts (2024)
- Key to the City - Presented by the Mayor of Lawrence Mass (2024)
- Street Naming – "Domenic Marte" established at the intersection of Chestnut St and Broadway, honoring his musical legacy and community impact (2024). He became the first U.S.-based Bachata singer to receive an official street dedication, as confirmed by the City Council and Mayor Brian DePeña.
- Guinness World Record Participant – Largest serving of Mangú (1,000 lbs)
- Additional honors from Premios Estrella, Premios Charolos, and Premios Círculo Dorado

In 2024, El Mundo Boston recognized Domenic Marte as a symbol of Latino pride in Massachusetts, highlighting his Dominican-American roots and his contributions to Bachata music over two decades. The article also emphasized his independent success and continued relevance in Latin music, citing his crossover appeal and recognition in both the U.S. and Latin American markets.

== Public Appearances and Cultural Recognition ==
Domenic Marte has been invited to perform the National Anthem at New England Revolution (2017), Major League Baseball (MLB) games, including appearances at Fenway Park (2015, 2021, 2025) and Tampa Rays Stadium (2021), as part of Latin Heritage celebrations. His performances have honored Dominican-American contributions to music and culture, "placing him among the few Bachata artists to be featured in high-profile national sporting events" and receive such mainstream sports recognition.

== Discography ==
=== Studio albums ===
- Intimamente (2004)
- Deseos De Amarte (2007)
- The Voice (2013)
- For the World (2015)
- Al Fin Libre (2018)
- For You Vol 1 (2022)
- For You Vol 2 (2026)

=== Selected singles ===
- "Ven Tú" (2004)
- "Deseos De Amarte" (2005)
- "Eres Así" (2009)
- "Como Quisiera" (2016)
- "Te Casarías Conmigo" (2019)
- "Tu Final" (2021)
- "Recuerdame" (2024)

=== Compilation albums ===
- For You Vol 1 (2022)
- Multiple songs – #1 on Music Choice Tropicales (2020–2025)

=== Notable charting songs ===
- "Muero De Celos" – #4 Billboard Tropical (2013)
- "Eres Así" – Premio Lo Nuestro nominated (2010)
- "In My Eyes" – #1 Monitor Latino USA Tropical (2020)

=== International chart appearances and playlist milestones ===
Between 2024 and 2025, several of Domenic Marte’s songs charted internationally across iTunes and Apple Music:

- Cirugía De Amor reached #12 on the iTunes Turkey Latino Chart (March 29, 2024).
- La Quiero reached #10 on the Apple Music Nepal Latino Chart (March 15, 2024) and #37 on the iTunes Russia Latino Chart (February 13, 2025).
- Con Los Ojos Cerrados reached #23 on the iTunes Sweden Latino Chart (February 7, 2025).
- Ya Que Te Vas A Ir reached #24 on the iTunes Sweden Latino Chart (February 7, 2025).

Additionally, Ella Se Llevó Mi Vida was featured at #20 on Spotify’s Ven Báilalo – Angel y Khriz playlist (3.8K followers), and Lucharé por Tu Amor reached a Spotify popularity index of 20 in March 2024.
