= Puerto Plata (disambiguation) =

Puerto Plata is a city in the Dominican Republic.

Puerto Plata may also refer to:

- Gregorio Luperón International Airport, the airport in Puerto Plata
- Puerto Plata province, a province of the Dominican Republic
- Puerto Plata (musician) (1923–2020), a Dominican musician
