= Traditional bachata =

Musical subgenre of the Dominican Republic

Traditional bachata is a subgenre of bachata music genre.

It refers to the acoustic style of bachata that was popular in the Dominican Republic from the 1960s until about 1990. For most of that period, bachata was performed with two nylon-string guitars (often with fishing line for string), an acoustic upright bass or marimbula, maracas, and bongo drum. Towards the end of the 1980s, Blas Duran and other bachata artists began to perform with electric guitar, and replaced the maracas with the güira. The new style that took root is referred to as modern bachata.

Traditional bachata bands played son, merengue, and waltz in addition to bolero-based songs. Over time, the influence of merengue began to be felt more in the style of bolero-based bachata. The introduction of the güira, a merengue instrument, and merengue-adapted guitar riffs and rhythmic sections marked the evolution of modern bachata.
