= Jawbone (instrument) =

Musical instrument made from the jawbone of an equine or cow

Quijada
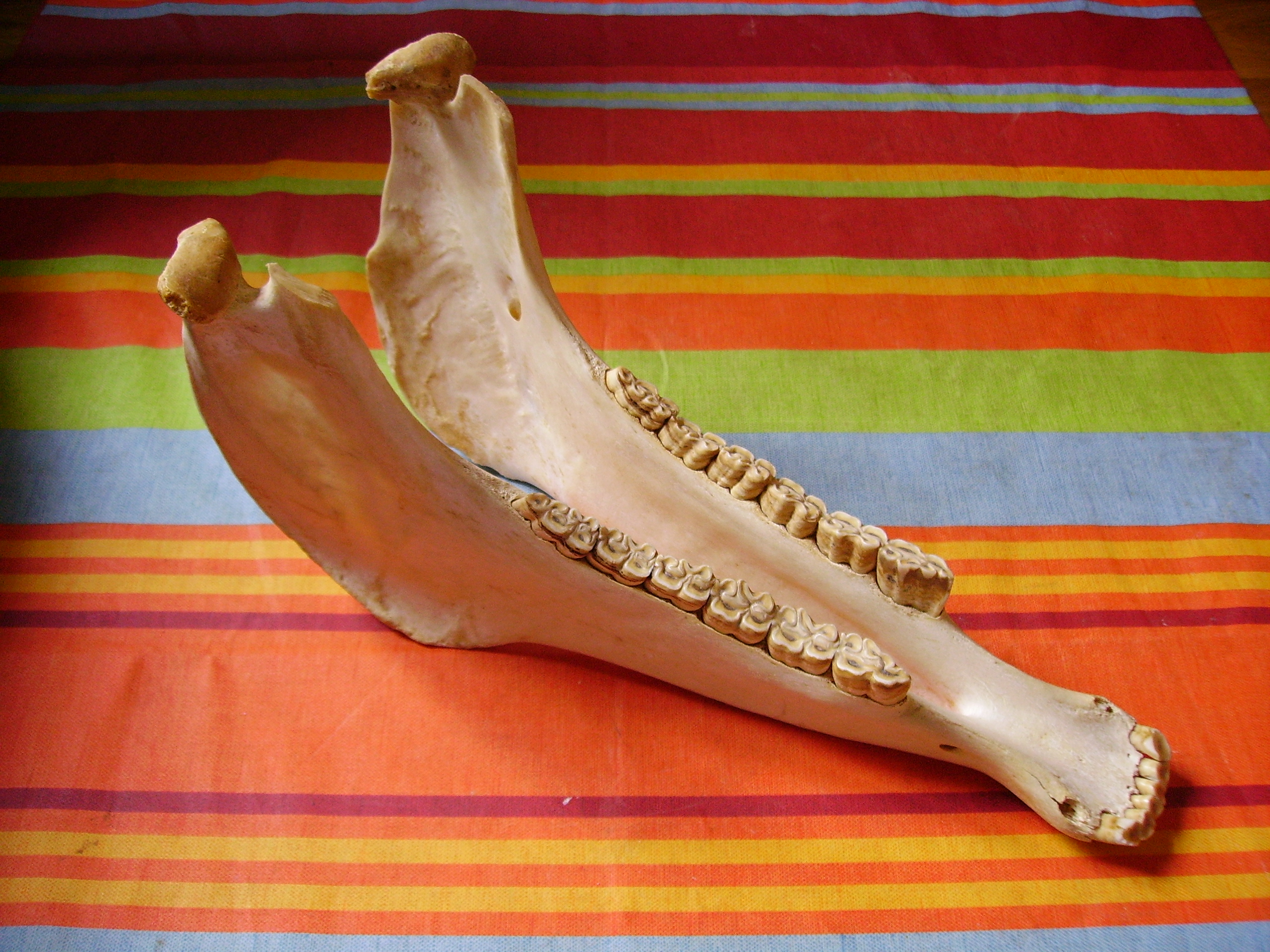
- Quijada: a jawbone used as a musical instrument

Percussion instrument
- Other names: quijada de burro, charrasca, jawbone
- Classification: idiophone
- Hornbostel–Sachs classification: 112.211 (indirectly struck idiophone; scraped sticks without a resonator)

Related instruments
- Güiro, güira, reco-reco

The quijada, charrasca, or jawbone (in English) is an idiophone percussion instrument made from the jawbone of a donkey, horse, mule, or cattle, producing a powerful buzzing sound. The jawbone is cleaned of tissue and dried to make the teeth loose and act as a rattle. It is used in music in most of Latin America, including Mexico, Peru, El Salvador, Ecuador, and Cuba. It was also historically used in the early American minstrel show.

== Technique ==
Veracruzan jaranera woman playing the jawbone.

To play it, a musician holds one end in one hand and strikes the other with either a stick or their hand; this causes the teeth to rattle against the bone creating a loud, untuned sound, specific to this instrument. The stick can also be pulled along the teeth which act as a rasp. These ingredients provide the basis for a wide variety of combinations and rhythms.

== Historical and cultural content ==
Peruvian musician playing Afro-Peruvian music with the quijada de burro.

While it is used in most of Latin America, the quijada originated from the Africans that were brought to the Americas during the colonial era. It is believed that it was first introduced in Peru, making it an Afro-Peruvian instrument. It is a mix of African and indigenous cultures that created an instrument that gained value from the people of Latin America. It is one of the main instruments used by Afro-Peruvian musical ensembles and is used in many other Latin American cultures, like the candombe of Argentina (in Uruguay it is not used), Costa Rica, the Dominican Republic, Haiti, as well as Belizean brukdown, Mexican music by son jarocho, and "Costa Chica" ensembles. An example is a song played in Oaxaca, Mexico in which the quijada keeps the beat. The quijada de burro (quijada made of donkey jaw) is most often used at carnivals and religious festivals. In popular culture the use of a quijada was shown in a conga dance scene in a 1939 film ("Midnight" starring Claudette Colbert and Don Ameche) beginning at 54:35.

== See also ==
- Latin American music
- Vibraslap
- Bones (instrument)
