= Scratcher (instrument) =

Percussion instrument from Trinidad and Tobago

In the musical traditions of Trinidad and Tobago, a twin island republic in the Lesser Antilles, a scratcher is a percussion instrument. It is a descendant of the guiro, and is played in a similar fashion. It is most commonly found in the rhythm section of a steelband.

== Construction ==
Scratchers are generally made by punching hundreds of nail holes in a sheet of aluminum, creating a texture. The sheet is then rolled into a cylinder shape with the textured side facing out. A handle is then added to the side. Scratchers vary in length in diameter but a common size consists of a length of 30 inches and a diameter of 4 inches. The pattern and density of nail holes can also vary, which can have an effect on the sound of the instrument.

== Use ==
A comb with teeth (sometimes a fan-style afro pick) is scraped along the texture in a set, syncopated rhythm. This pattern is meant to interlock with those of the other instruments of the rhythm section. it is also used in the engine room section in a steel band.in addition, it is used in Parang.
