= Puerto Plata (musician) =

Dominican musician (1923–2020)

José Cobles (August 4, 1923 – January 4, 2020), better known by his nickname of Puerto Plata, was a Dominican musician. He sang in a style reminiscent of the Dominican guitar tradition of the 1930s and 1940s, when bolero, merengue, and son were all variations of the same Afro-Iberian fusion.

== Biography ==
Plata was born in the resort town of Puerto Plata in August 1923.

Under the dictatorship of Rafael Leónidas Trujillo, few recordings were made of guitar music in the Dominican republic. Trujillo favored merengue tipico, a rural style of merengue played with the accordion. While guitar music was still immensely popular among the poor, it was looked down on by the nation's elite, and few opportunities were given for guitar based groups to record or perform in classy venues. After Trujillo's assassination in 1961, guitar music continued to be stigmatized, but an industry began to coalesce around popular guitar acts who by then were evolving a style which has come to be known as bachata.

Puerto Plata gives one of the few surviving examples of the style of music played in the Trujillo period - before Dominican guitar music evolved into bachata. Compared to modern bachateros, Puerto Plata's style, while strongly Dominican, is closer to that of contemporary Cuban masters like Trio Matamoros and Antonio Machin.

Puerto Plata's band is made up of some of the Dominican Republic's finest musicians, including virtuoso guitar legends Edilio Paredes and Frank Mendez.

Mujer de Cabaret, Puerto Plata first internationally distributed album, was released by iASO Records in September 2007 to much critical acclaim including glowing reviews in the New York Times and France's Liberation. Puerto Plata's followup, "Casita de Campo", was selected by National Geographic as one of the ten best albums of 2009.

Puerto Plata performed at festivals and performing arts centers throughout the United States and Canada, including Montreal Jazz Festival, Seattle's Meany Hall, World Music Festival Chicago, and Madison World Music Festival, Globalquerque in Albuquerque, NM.

He died in January 2020 at the age of 96.
