= Guayo =

Metal scraper used as a percussion instrument

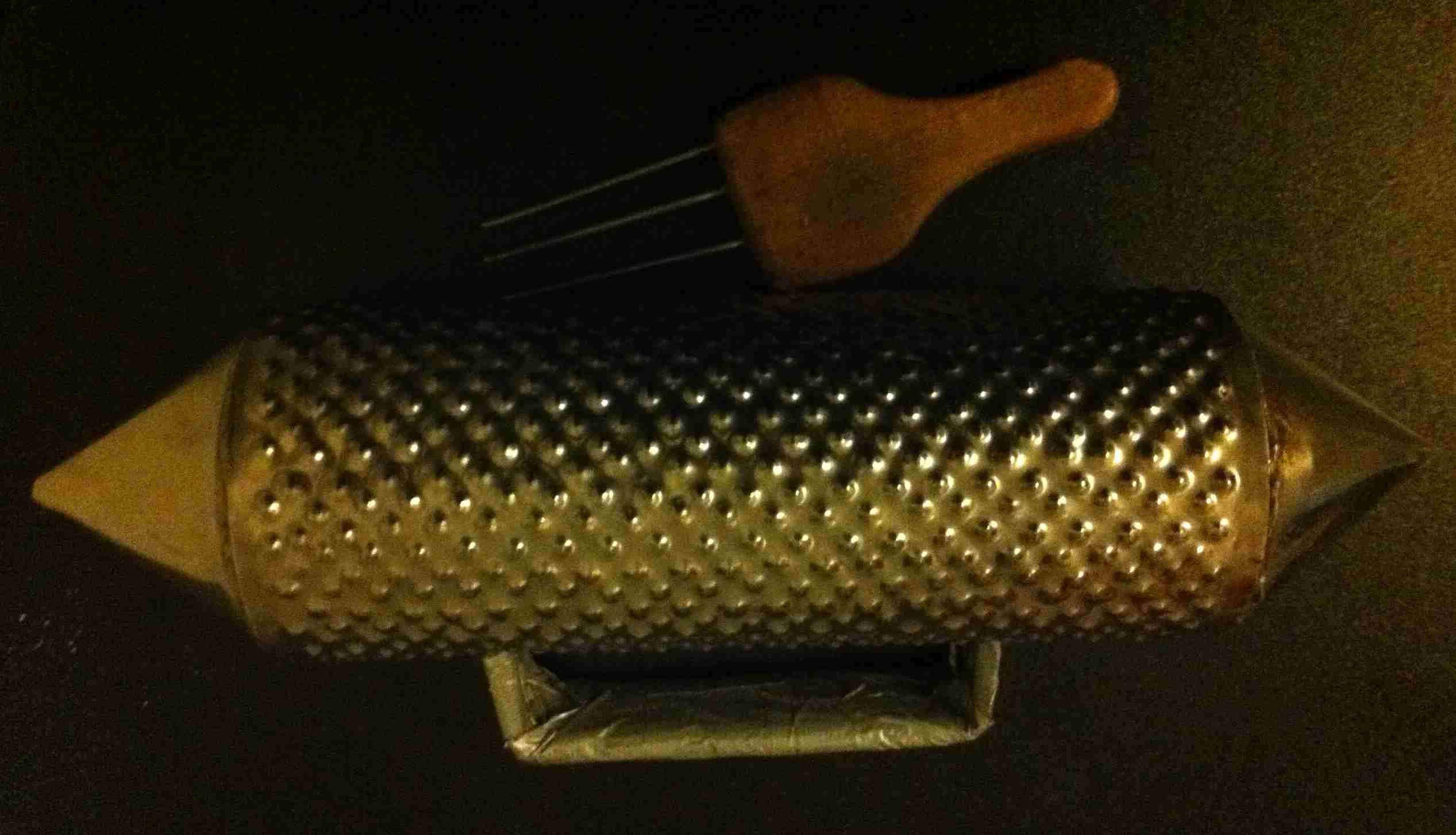

Percussion instrument
- Other names: Ralladera
- Classification: Metal idiophone
- Hornbostel–Sachs classification: 112.23 (Scraped idiophone, vessel)

Playing range
- Speed of scrape produces some variation

Related instruments
- Güiro, güira, guacharaca, reco-reco, quijada, washboard

The guayo or ralladera is a metal scraper used as a percussion instrument in traditional styles of Cuban music such as changüí, predecessor of son cubano. Largely replaced by the güiro (gourd scraper) during the 20th century, the guayo is now rare. In the Dominican Republic, the güira, a similar metal scraper used in merengue, is sometimes called guayo. In contrast to Cuba, güiras replaced güiros in the early 20th century.

== In changüí ==
The guayo survives in Cuba almost exclusively as part of changüí performances in the eastern regions of the country (formerly known as the Oriente Province). It is one of the five instruments played in the genre together with the maracas, botija or marímbula, bongo, and tres. Guayos consist of a cylindrical metal sheet with a cheese grater surface which is scraped with a metal rod or bone.

Notable guayo players include Santiago Reyes "Chago Guayo", Carlos Borromeo Planche "Cambrón" and José Andrés Rodríguez Ramírez, all of which were also singers and members of Grupo Changüí de Guantánamo.

== See also ==
- Güiro - gourd scraper from Cuba
- Güira - metal scraper from the Dominican Republic
- Quijada - scraped jawbone from Cuba
- Maracas - gourd shaker from Cuba
