= Eddie Blazquez =

American musician

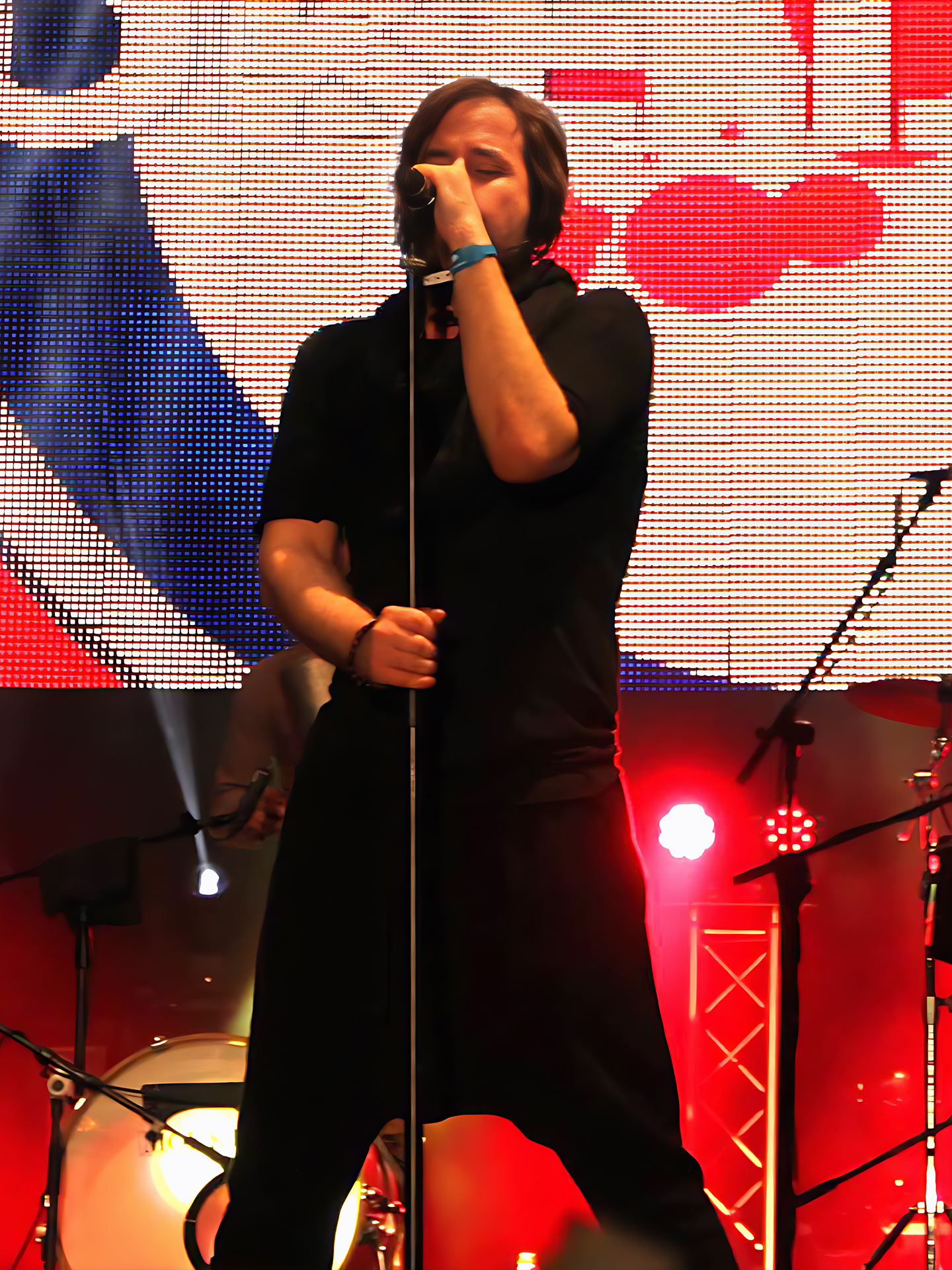
- Born: Puerto Rico
- Occupations: Singer, songwriter, author, director
- Years active: 1996–present
- Notable work: I'm Not Supposed To Be Here (docuseries, 2025)

Eddie Blazquez is an American musician, author, and director. He is known as the frontman of the Latin group Toke D Keda, for starring and directing in Mega TV's series El Show Mas Estupido De La Television, and for creating and directing the docuseries I'm Not Supposed To Be Here, which premiered on The Roku Channel.

As of 2025, his music has streamed in over 162 countries, with more than 68 million streams across all albums. Blazquez is a voting member of The Latin Grammys and The Latin Recording Academy.

== Early life ==
Blazquez was born and raised in Puerto Rico and later based in Miami, Florida. His father is from Spain, while his mother is from Puerto Rico. In 1998 he won an international recording contract with Sony Music as part of the TV series Suenos De Fama, which aired nationally on Telemundo Networks.

== Early recordings ==
Blazquez released a ten-track, self-titled solo album, Eddie Blazquez, in 1996. It includes tracks such as "Cuántas Veces," "Vete Ya," and "Amor Amargo".

== Toke D Keda ==
By the mid-2000s, Blazquez became the lead singer of Toke D Keda. Their debut album, Picando Alante, was released in 2005. The band later released compilations and singles, including "Debo Pensar". In 2009 they released Lo Siento and continued to release further albums.

== Touring ==
Blazquez has performed over 550 concerts across more than 60 countries on six continents, including Russia, Japan, China, Australia, Egypt, Spain, Italy, Singapore, the United Kingdom, Greece, Thailand, Sweden, Turkey, Hungary, the Netherlands, and Norway.

== Film and television ==
Blazquez directed and starred in the four-part docuseries I'm Not Supposed to Be Here (2025), which premiered on The Roku Channel. In 2005 he starred in Mega TV's series El Show Mas Estupido De La Television, which he also directed.

== Studio albums ==
Year	Title	Artist	Label
1996	Eddie Blazquez	Eddie Blazquez	DIN/DiscoLandia
2005	Picando Alante	Toke D Keda	Universal Music
2009	Lo Siento	Toke D Keda	Revolver Music
2014	Ilogico Amor	Toke D Keda	Revolver Music
2019	La Coleccion	Toke D Keda	Revolver Music
2020	Juntos	Toke D Keda	Revolver Music
2022	Legado	Toke D Keda	Revolver Music
2024	I'm Not Supposed To Be Here	Toke D Keda	Revolver Music

== Filmography ==
Year	Title	Role	Notes
2006	El Show Mas Estupido De La Television	Director / Host	TV Series
2025	I'm Not Supposed To Be Here	Director	Docuseries

== Memoir and podcast companion ==
Blazquez published a memoir titled I'm Not Supposed To Be Here, available in book and audiobook formats on Audible A companion podcast is accessible via iHeart Radio.
