= Toke D Keda =

Latin band led by Eddie Blazquez

- Origin: Miami, Florida, United States
- Genres: Latin pop
- Years active: 2000–present
- Label: Revolver Music
- Members: Eddie Blazquez
- Website: https://tokedkeda.com/

Toke D Keda is an American band formed in Miami, Florida, in 2000 by singer-songwriter Eddie Blazquez. The group incorporates elements of Latin music, pop, and fusion.

Since its formation, Toke D Keda has released studio albums and compilations. The band has been streamed in more than 160 countries. Over the last 2 decades, the band has toured across six continents, including North America, South America, Europe, Asia, and Oceania. The group's history has been documented in the 2025 Roku docuseries I’m Not Supposed To Be Here, as well as in a memoir and companion podcast authored by Blazquez.

The original lineup included Elvis Pérez (Cuba), Eddie Blazquez (Puerto Rico), Jalen James Acosta, and Ariel Marmolejos (both Dominican Republic). Early songs included "Fuiste tú" and "Debo Pensar," written by Blazquez.

The group recorded its first album, Picando Alante, with producer Roy Tavare, who had previously worked with Shakira and Ricky Martin. Guitarist Fernando "Toby" Tobón, known for his collaborations with Santana, Karol G, and Juanes, contributed guitar, bass, and sexto recordings. Programming was handled by Ahmed Barroso, who had worked with Enrique Iglesias and Marc Anthony. Marcos Hernández, a member of the Dominican band 4-40 founded by Juan Luis Guerra, provided chorus vocals. The album was released in 2005 through Universal Music Latino, under license from Perfect Image Records.

Toke D Keda gave its first public performance at Miami's Calle Ocho Festival, marking the beginning of the group's live appearances.

During its early years, the band contributed to several Latin music compilations, including Reggaetón en la Parada Puertorriqueña, Vol 2, Latino 8, Latino 14, and Caribe Mix, which helped position them within the Latin pop and reggaetón markets of the mid-2000s.

In 2009, Toke D Keda, or sometimes spelled Toque D Keda depending on the country, recorded the album Lo Siento in Miami with producer Jean Rodriguez, whose production credits include work with Rosalia, Christina Aguilera, and Anitta.

== Discography ==
Year	Title	Artist	Label
2005	Picando Alante	Toke D Keda	PerfImg/Universal
2005	Reggaeton en la Parada Puertorriqueña, Vol2	Various	PerfImg/Universal
2005	Latino 8	Various	Planet Records
2006	Latino 14	Various	Planet Records
2007	Caribe Mix	Various	Blanco y Negro
2009	Lo Siento	Toke D Keda	Revolver Music
2009	I Love Bachata	Various	Planet/Sony
2014	Ilogico Amor	Toke D Keda	Revolver Music
2019	La Coleccion	Toke D Keda	Revolver Music
2020	Juntos	Toke D Keda	Revolver Music
2022	Legado	Toke D Keda	Revolver Music
2024	I'm Not Supposed To Be Here	Toke D Keda	Revolver Music

== Touring ==
Toke D Keda has performed in a wide range of countries across Europe, Asia, Africa, Oceania, and the Americas.

Europe: Belgium, Finland, France, Germany, Hungary, Italy, Latvia, Denmark, Netherlands, Norway, Bulgaria, Romania, Greece, San Marino, Monaco, Poland, Slovakia, Spain, Sweden, Switzerland, United Kingdom, Croatia

Africa/Middle East: Egypt, Dubai

Oceania: Australia

Eurasia: Russia, Turkey

Asia: China, Japan, Singapore, Thailand

North America: United States, Canada

Central America: Mexico, Panama

South America: Colombia, Peru

== Documentary: "I'm Not Supposed To Be Here" ==
A four-part, five-hour docuseries titled I'm Not Supposed To Be Here, created by Eddie Blazquez, premiered on The Roku Channel on August 12, 2025. The program covers the history of Toke D Keda, including accounts of the band's career, industry challenges, and performances.

== Memoir and podcast companion ==
Blazquez also authored a memoir titled I'm Not Supposed To Be Here, released in print and audiobook formats, with a companion podcast distributed through iHeart Radio.

In 2024, Blazquez became a voting member of the Latin Recording Academy, the organization responsible for the Latin Grammy Awards.
