= La quinceañera (film) =

- Directed by: Adam Taub
- Release date: May 4, 2007
- Running time: 42 minutes
- Country: United States
- Language: Spanish

La quinceañera is a documentary film produced and directed by Adam Taub released in 2007. It was shot in Tijuana, Mexico and follows Ana Maria and her family as they prepare for and celebrate her quinceañera. The quinceañera or quince años (sometimes represented XV Años, meaning "fifteen years") is, in some Spanish-speaking regions of the Americas, a young woman's celebration of her fifteenth birthday, which is celebrated in a unique and different way from her other birthdays. The word is also used to refer to the young woman whose 15th birthday is being celebrated (analogous to the word cumpleañera for "birthday girl").

== Reception ==
La quinceañera won the "Outstanding Documentary Award" at the 2007 Angelus Student Film Festival and the San Diego Latino Film Festival Award for Best Student Documentary.

A reviewer for Críticas magazine called the film a "fine introduction" to the quinceañera rite. A reviewer for Reel Talk called the film sensitive and revealing.

== Awards ==
- 2007 Angelus Student Film Festival Award for Best Documentary
- 2008 San Diego Latino Film Festival Award for Best Student Documentary
