= Marino Perez =

- Born: Marino Perez; December 26, 1946; Guayabo Dulce, Hato Mayor del Rey, Dominican Republic
- Died: April 26, 1991 (aged 44) San Pedro de Macorís, Dominican Republic
- Genres: Latin; Bachata
- Occupations: Musician; singer
- Instruments: Vocals; guitar
- Years active: 1970–1991
- Label: RM Records

Marino Perez (December 26, 1946 - July 26, 1991), also known as Esteban Perez, is considered one of the greatest bachateros of all time. Known as "The Father of Bitter Bachata", Perez wrote music that often dealt with the hardships of prison life, prostitution, and his struggles with alcoholism. His career peaked in the 70s and 80s with a long list of hits, including Ay Mami, La Historia De Marino, and No La Quiero Ver Con Otro.

== Biography ==
Perez was born to Carmen Perez and Arcadio Astacio on December 26, 1946, in Guayabo Dulce, a province of Hato Mayor del Rey, Dominican Republic. As a young boy, Perez would fish and swim in a local river, later inspiring him to write songs about his experience of nature. Perez began to work at the age of fourteen as a sugar cane cutter, earning only 35 cents per trip. It was at this time that his sister Leonidas "Morena" Rondon Perez moved to Placer Bonito at No. 34 Maria Quirino St. in neighboring province San Pedro de Macorís. Nine years later, Perez decided to move to San Pedro de Macorís, where he made contact with local musicians Negro Sánchez, Suri Domínguez, Julito Reyes, and Ramón Marrero. Perez would meet them at Sánchez's home in Loma del Cochero, where they would play and compose songs under a limoncillo tree. During these years, Perez recorded his first and second albums, "Sin Rumbo" and "Entre Copa y Copa", which did not succeed.

In the 70's, Christopher Acosta formed the group "Los Dominicanos del Ritmo", later known as "Los Cibernéticos", which Perez joined. The group would meet at "El 28", an entertainment center located on the street 30 de marzo next to the sports complex. There Perez met Cristóbal Acosta, Ángel Guerrero, Sijo Osoria, José Ventura, Juan Bautista, Tony Santos, Pepillo the owner of "El 28", and others.

After Perez's first hit, "Aclamando El Licor", his songs were widely broadcast. He was supported by broadcasters Gregorio Justiniano in Radio Mar, Michel and Domingo de los Santos in Radio Dial, and Edwin Emmanuel (el bravo) in Radio Oriente. Perez and Los Cibernéticos hosted well-attended events in the Apollo Disco Club. Marino popularized many songs, including "El Trago de Olvidar", "De Taberna en Taberna", and "La Espero Bebiendo". Marino was loved and acclaimed by many, but his enjoyment of parties, women, and liquor led to a poor reputation. He was not received well in some parts of society and drew inspiration from this criticism to write "Que Sigan Criticando que Yo Sigo Gozando". Due to his talent, Perez could find inspiration in sayings, holidays, stories, and even tragic events. A musician who was at the height of his career, Wilfrido Vargas, found some of Perez's hits and adapted them, resulting in a resounding international success. However, despite the success of his albums, Perez lived his life in poverty as bachateros were underpaid.

In 1991, Marino was admitted to San Pedro Medical Center for liver cirrhosis, staying there briefly before returning to his family. He died two days later at his home on Romana Gonzales St. in the neighborhood of Mejico No. 145 in San Pedro de Macoris, where he lived with his mother, sister, and two daughters Raysa Perez and Johanna Veronica.

Perez was known as one of the most authentic representatives of bachata. Just minutes after the Radio Dial news broadcast of his death, the city of San Pedro de Macoris became a sea of tears and grief for such a huge loss. His funeral is remembered for being one of the most emotional and well attended events in the history of the city. When the funeral motorcade arrived at the cemetery next to Santa Fe, the tail was still in the park Duarte. Marino Perez's songs still live in all stations across the country even with the passage of years after his death. The public continues to buy his records, and he is remembered as a musical icon for his career in folk art.

== Discography ==
- La Tragedia de un Veneno (1970)
1. La Tragedia de un Veneno
2. Acabaré con el Licor
3. Pero No Me Olvides
4. Regresa Mi Amor
5. Puedes Andar con Quien Quieras
6. A Esa No lo Pruebas Tú
7. De Eso Me Río Yo
8. ¿Por Qué Me Abandonaste?
9. Tus Lindos Ojos Mi Amor
10. No la Olvidaré
- Boleros (1979)
1. ¿Detrás de Quién Volviste?
2. La Madre Fue Culpable
3. Desde Que Te Fuiste
4. Quiero Beber
5. No Vuelvas a Molestarme
6. Sólo Así Eres un Hombre
7. Huérfano de Amor
8. El Último Que Ríe
9. Sígueme
10. No Soy Tonto
- Los Éxitos de Marino Pérez (1979)
1. Chiquitita
2. Una Copa Más
3. Vine a Buscarte Morena
4. Princesita
5. Yo Que Sí, y Tú Que No
6. Déjala Tranquila
7. La Pago Yo o la Paga Ella
8. Carita de Santo
9. La Desflorada
10. Sígueme
- Por Mi Madre Que Yo No Fui (1980)
1. La Esperaré Bebiendo
2. No la Quiero Ver con Otro
3. Vine a Buscarte Morena
4. El Trago de Olvidar
5. Sígueme
6. Déjala Tranquila
7. Yo Que Si, y Tú Que No
8. La Mujer Que Me Comprende
9. Por Mi Madre Que Yo No Fui
10. Yo No Puedo Más
11. Déjala Pasar
12. Pena y Sentimiento
13. La Alabanciosa
14. Vámonos a Caballito
15. Por Andar de Parrandera
- De Eso Me Río Yo (1981)
1. De Eso Me Río Yo
2. Contestación al Puñalito de Acero
3. El Trago del Olvido
4. De Qué Tú Privas
5. Asesíname
6. Traicionera Sin Bandera
7. Bebiendo Seguiré
8. Sentado en la Pared
9. No Te Puedo Olvidar
10. Te Llevaré Conmigo
- 15 Éxitos (1985)
1. Con el Pecho y el Corazón
2. Ay Mami
3. El Último Golpe
4. La Ruta Desaparecida
5. Ay! Morena, Ay! Bendito
6. A Esa Me la Llevo Yo
7. La Comezón
8. Perdida
9. Dónde Está Mi Mujer
10. El Recuento de Marino
11. Amor a la Buena
12. Con el Bate en la Mano
13. Como Tú Ninguna
14. ¿Cuándo Vendrás?
15. Paloma Herida
- Vol. 2 (2002)
1. Yo No Puedo Más
2. De Tu Boca Quiero un Beso
3. No y No (El Dado y el Vironay)
4. Hay Amor
5. Yo la Quisiera Olvidar
6. Esta Noche
7. Por Mi Santa Madre
8. Mujer Traidora
9. Muero Por Ti
10. Qué Felicidad
