= Güiro =

Latin American percussion instrument

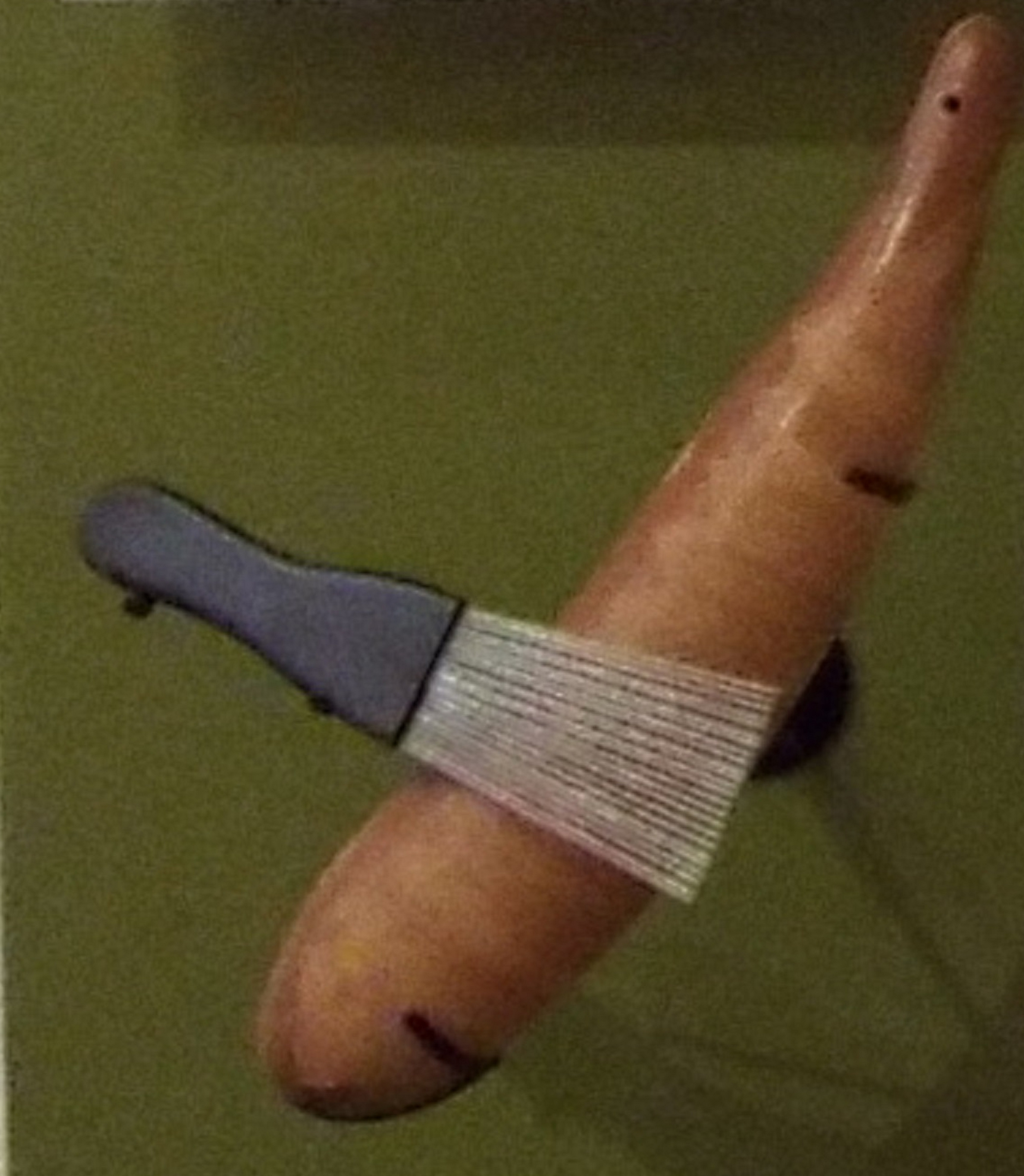
- Puerto Rican güiro on display in the Musical Instrument Museum of Phoenix

Percussion instrument
- Other names: Güira, rascador, güícharo (Puerto Rican, made from plastic), candungo, carracho, rayo
- Classification: Idiophone, can be made from wood, gourd, metal, plastic or fiberglass
- Hornbostel–Sachs classification: 112.23 (Scraped idiophone, vessel)

Playing range
- Speed of scrape produces some variation

Related instruments
- Güira, guayo, guacharaca, reco-reco, quijada, washboard, vest frottoir

Modern Güiro
Sounds of the güiro

The güiro (Spanish pronunciation: [ˈɡwiɾo]) is a percussion instrument consisting of an open-ended, hollow gourd with parallel notches cut in one side. It is played by rubbing a stick or tines (see photo) along the notches to produce a zipper-like ratchet sound.

The güiro is commonly used in Cuban, Puerto Rican, and other forms of Latin American music, and plays a key role in the typical rhythm section of important genres like son, trova and salsa. Playing the güiro usually requires both long and short sounds, made by scraping up and down in long or short strokes.

The güiro, like the maracas, is often played by a singer. It is closely related to the Cuban guayo, Dominican güira, and Haitian graj which are made of metal. Other instruments similar to the güiro are the Colombian guacharaca, the Brazilian reco-reco, the Cabo Verdean ferrinho, the quijada (cow jawbone) and the frottoir (French) or fwotwa (French Creole) (washboard).

== Etymology ==
In the Arawakan language, a language of the indigenous people of Latin America and spread throughout the Caribbean spoken by groups such as the Taíno, güiro referred to fruit of the güira and an instrument made from fruit of the güira.

== Construction and design ==
The güiro is a notched, hollowed-out gourd. Often, the calabash gourd is used. The güiro is made by carving parallel circular stripes along the shorter section of the elongated gourd. Today, many güiros are made of wood or fiberglass.

== History ==
The güiro was adapted from an instrument which originated in South America. The Aztecs produced an early cousin to the güiro, called the omitzicahuastli, which was created from a small bone with serrated notches and was played in the same manner as the güiro. The Taíno people of the Caribbean have been credited with the origins of the güiro. The Taínos of Dominican Republic, Cuba and Puerto Rico developed the güajey, a long gourd or animal bone with notches, an antecedent of the modern day güiro. Alternatively, in Africa a scraping instrument made of bone was used. . Blench (2009) suggests a connection with the scraped idiophones of Cameroon and other regions of West and Central Africa (see list of musical instruments of Cameroon). The Berom people of central Nigeria also have scraper or guiro-like instrument called gwák or gwàshák.

== Use in music ==
Across Latin America, the Caribbean, the güiro can be found in a variety of traditional, folk dance music and used in dance ensembles and religious festivals. In the Yucatán Peninsula, the güiro is used in two Mayan dances, the mayapax and the jarana. In Cuba, the güiro is used in the genre danzón. In Puerto Rico, the güiro often associated with the music of the jíbaro and is used in the musical genres of the plena, the seis, and the danza. In the Caribbean coast, the güiro was used in traditional, folk dance cumbia music and is still used in modern cumbia music. In Panama, the güiro can be found in folk dances such as the merjorana and cumbia.

=== Use in classical music ===
The güiro is used in classical music both to add Latin American flavor, and also purely for its instrumental qualities.

Examples of compositions including a güiro are Uirapuru by Heitor Villa-Lobos (though the score specifies reco-reco), Latin-American Symphonette by Morton Gould and The Rite of Spring (Le Sacre du printemps) by Stravinsky.

== Gallery ==
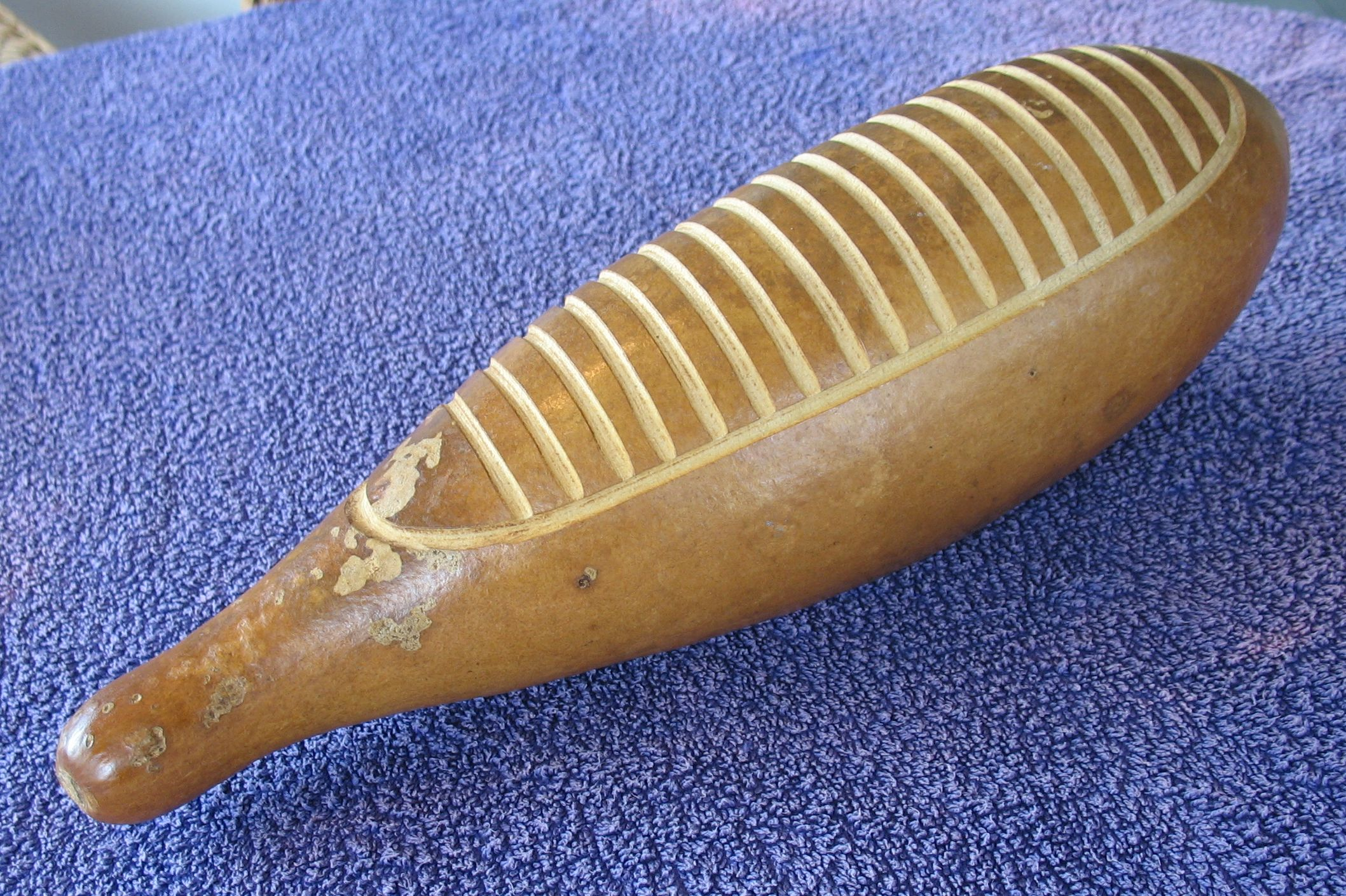
Cuban güiro

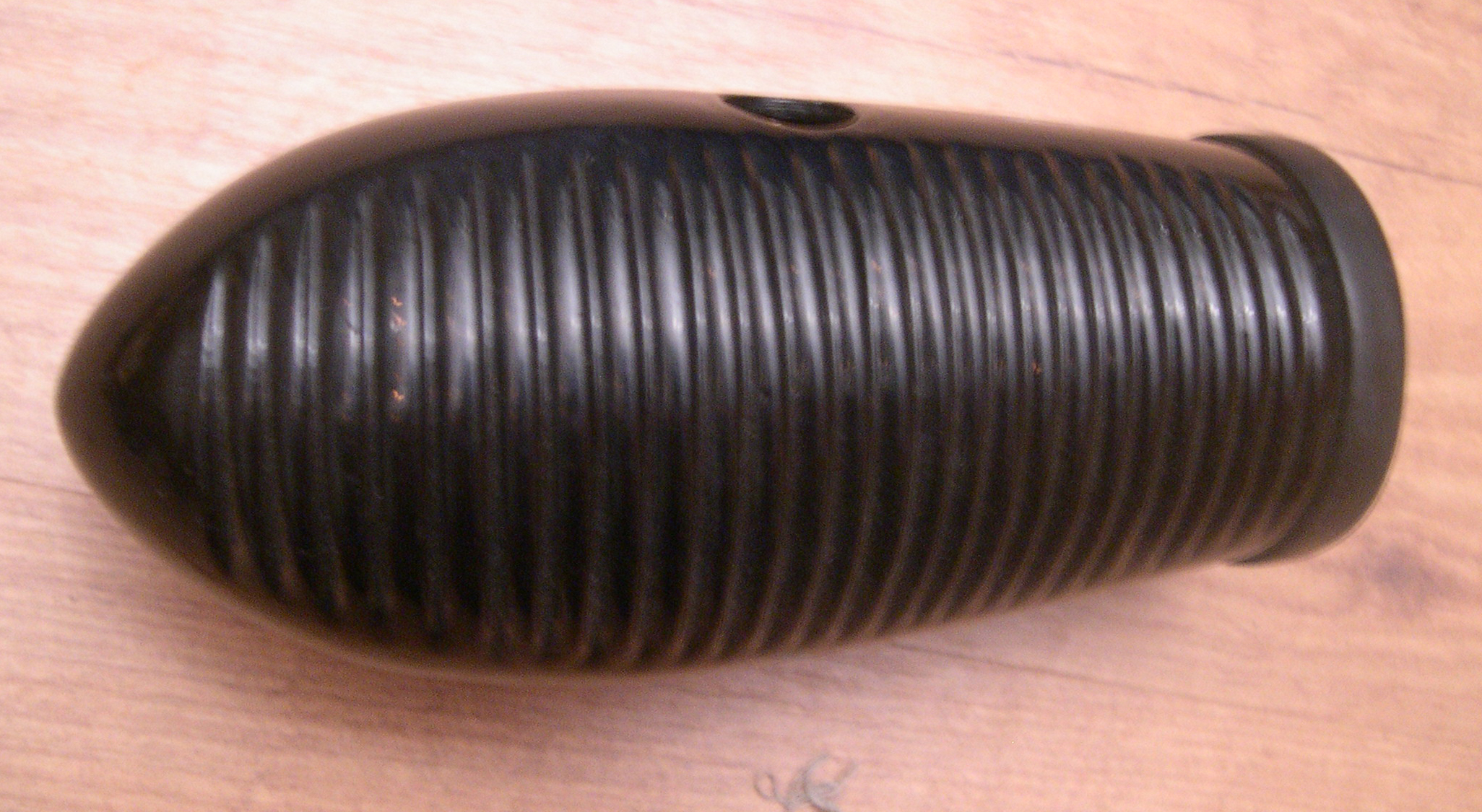
Modern fibreglass Cuban güiro

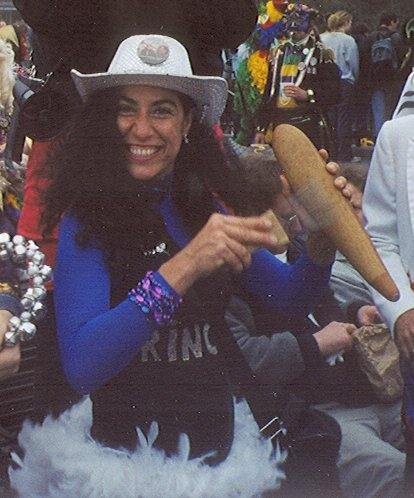
Puerto Rican güiro or güícharo

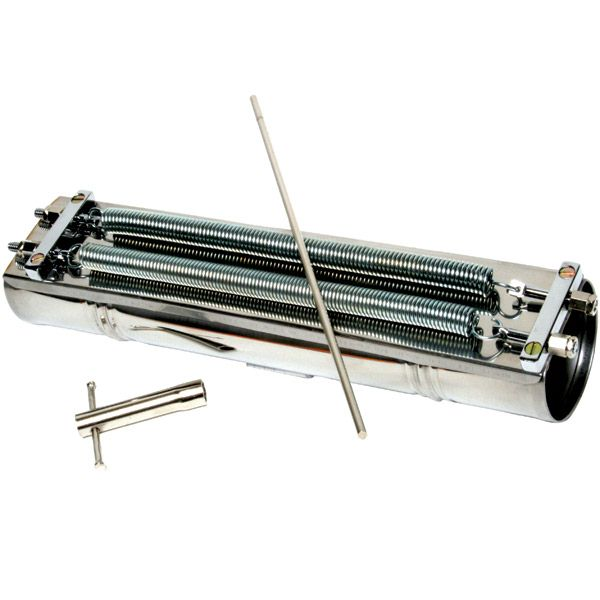
Brazilian reco-reco

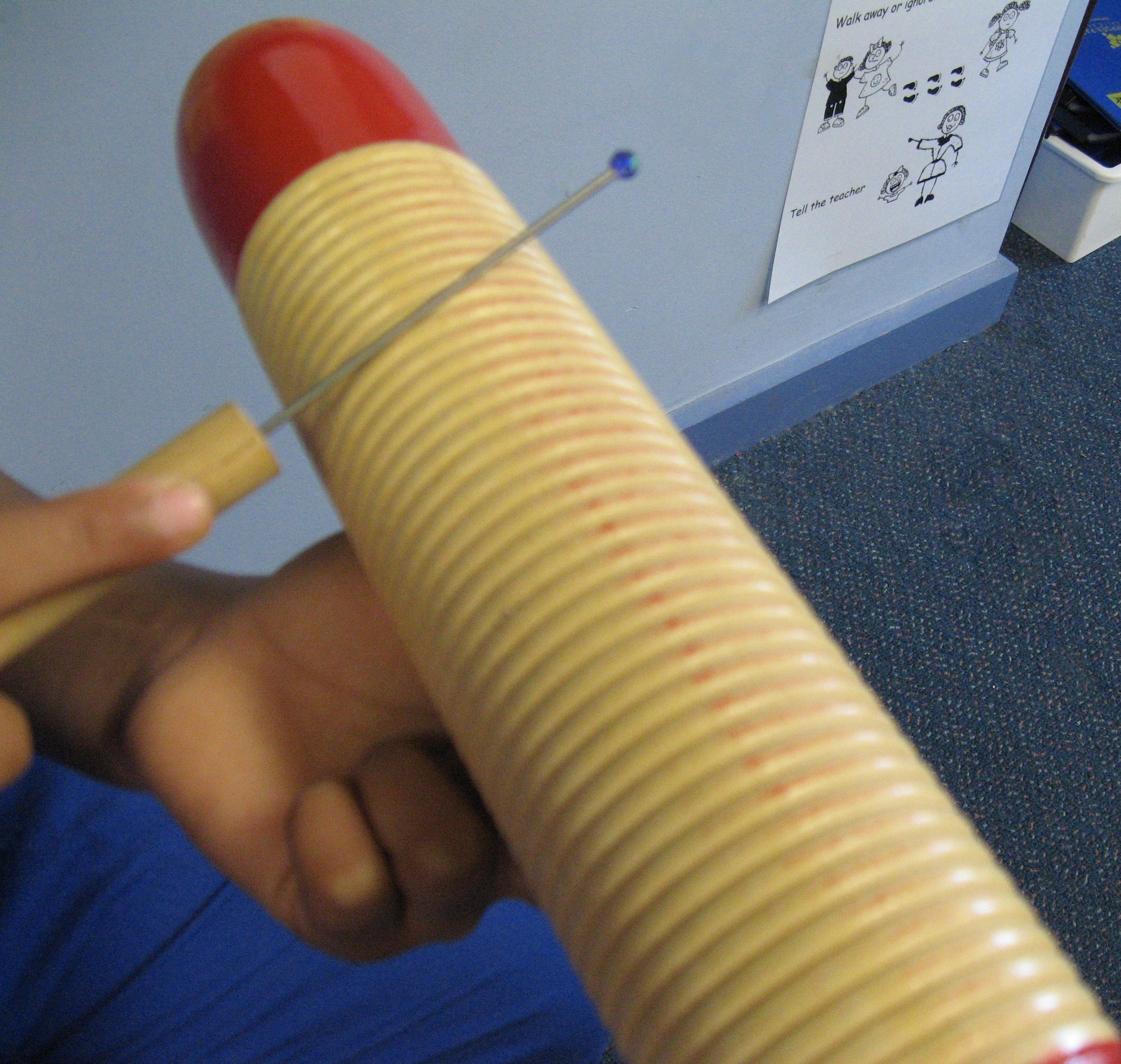
Güiro for children

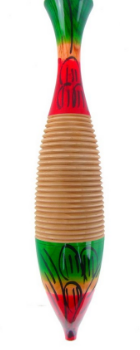
Mexican güiro

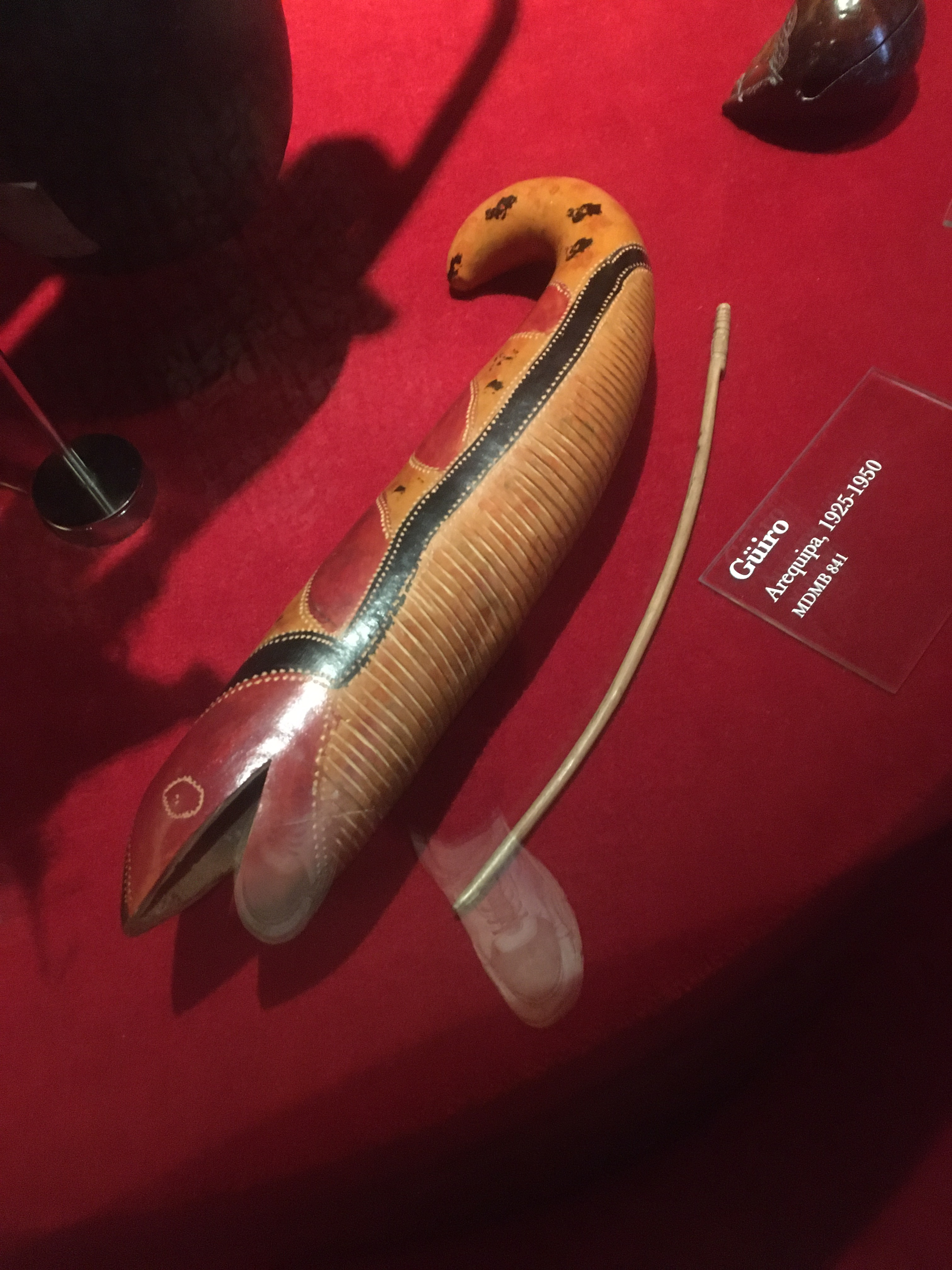
Peruvian güiro

== See also ==
- Guacharaca
- Guayo
- Güira
- Music of Latin America
- Reco-reco
- Scratcher (instrument)
- 'Under the Boardwalk', an American rock and roll song by The Drifters with a prominent güiro
- 'Gimme Shelter', a song by The Rolling Stones
