= Reco-reco =

Brazilian percussion instrument

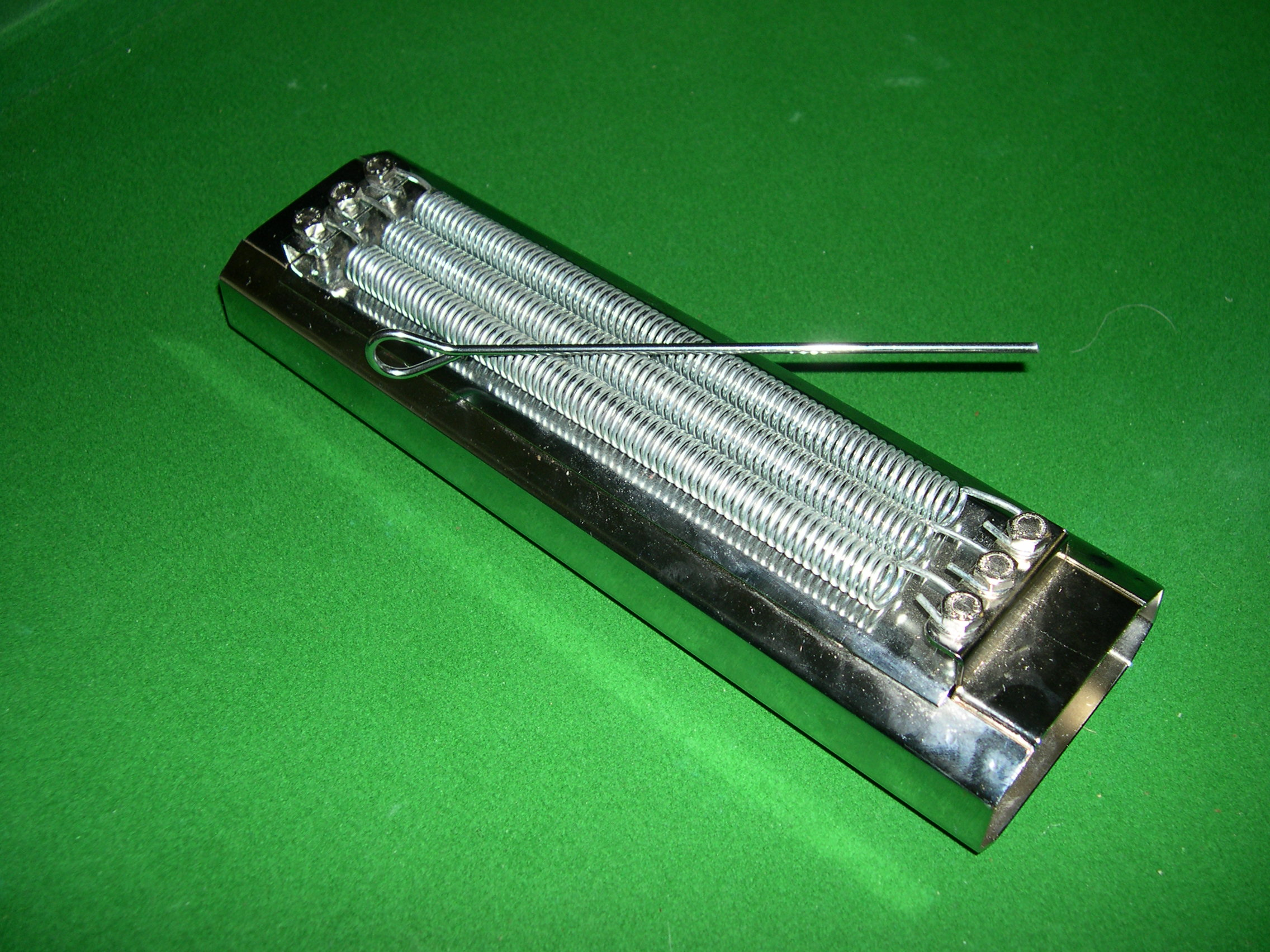
Reco-reco made of metal.

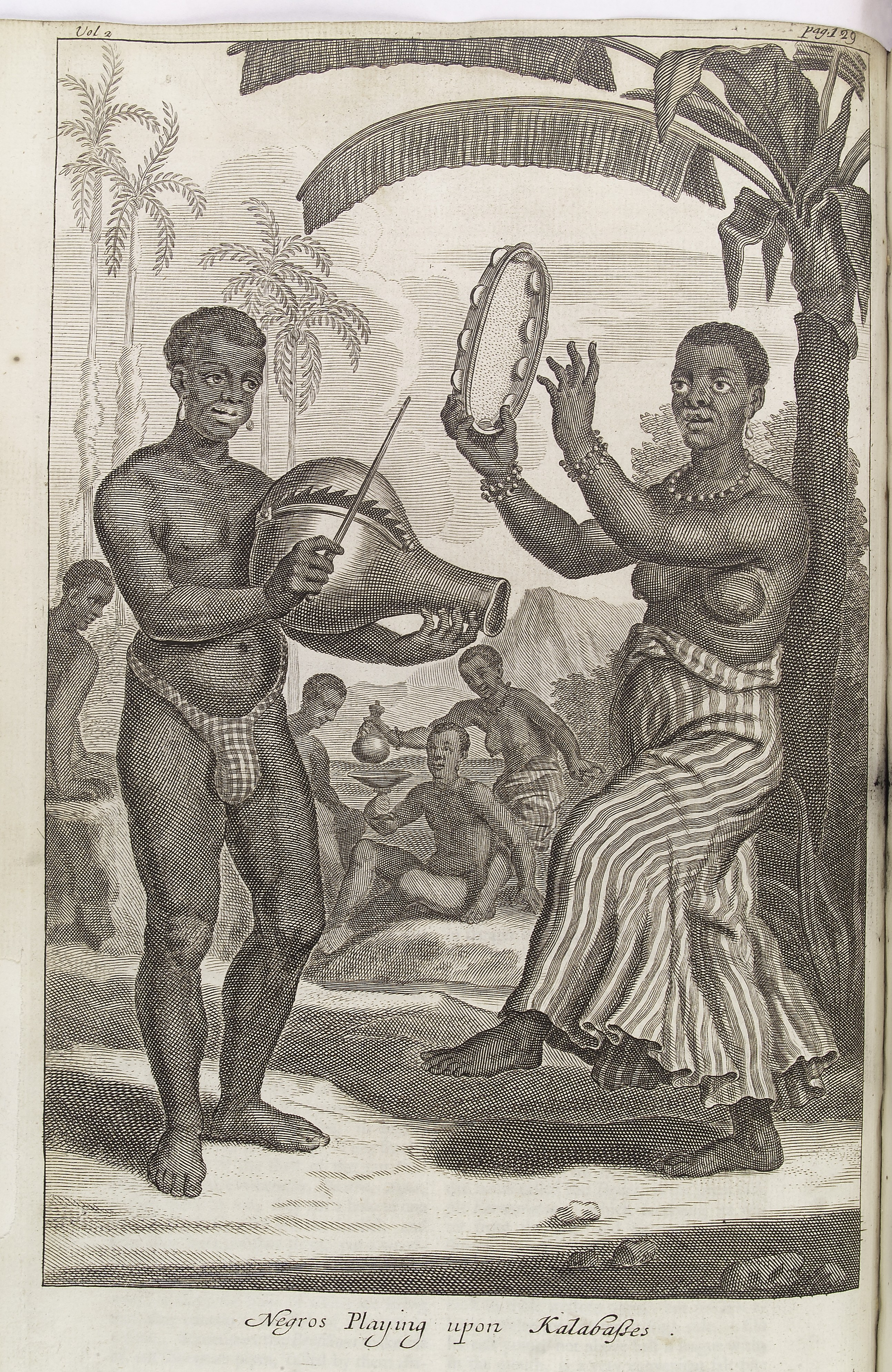
Traditional reco-reco and pandeiro

The reco-reco (also called the raspador, caracaxá or querequexé) is a scraper of African origin used as a percussion instrument in Brazilian music, but also in many Latin American countries, where it is known as güiro, güira, guayo and guacharaca.

Traditionally, the reco-reco was made from a sawtooth notched cylindrical body made of bamboo or wood, and played with a wooden stick. The instrument is used in many styles of Brazilian music, such as samba and related genres.

For some time, reco-recos have been made of a metallic cylinder with springs attached and played with a metal stick, which results in a much louder sound. In some models, the sound box has a hole on the bottom part, which can be covered with the hand to achieve different timbral possibilities. Nowadays, reco-recos have also been made out of fiberglass, but the wooden version remains the most popular.

== See also ==
- Capoeira music
