= Guandulito =

Dionisio Mejia, popularly known as Guandulito, (March 23, 1911 – June 1979) was a Dominican Republic singer and accordion player, who helped popularize the merengue tipico genre. Despite this he died in extreme poverty.

== Discography ==
- Guandulito y Su Conjunto (1960)
- Merengues (1960)
- Parranda En Sabana Iglesia (1960)
- En New York (1960)
- La Chiva Blanca de Don José (1960)
- Merengue Típico Dominicano Vol. 2 (1972)
- Merengues (1974)
- Haciendo Historia (with Wilfrido Vargas) (1979)
