= José Manuel Calderón (musician) =

Dominican musician and singer

José Manuel Calderón (El Maestro de Bachata) is considered the first musician to record bachata with "Borracho de amor" and "Condena", in 1962 at the Radio Televisión Dominicana studios. Calderón's voice was unlike typical bachateros, in that he sang in baritone. He also innovated instrumentation in bachata, applying strings, horn sections and piano, as well as replacing the maracas with a güira.

Calderón moved to New York City in 1967, and recorded with labels such as Kubaney and BMC. After five years, he returned to the Dominican Republic, only to find that the bachateros had been marginalized, since the genre itself had been associated with poverty and prostitution, and only Radio Guarachita, a nationwide radio station, played it. Disillusioned, Calderón returned to New York, where he found that a Dominican community was growing in Washington Heights, and was able to give rise to a popular bachata scene. Today, with the recent acceptance of bachata in the Dominican Republic and the US, Calderón receives a fraction of the recognition he deserves as one of the forefathers of the national genre. He continues to record and distribute his own recordings.

== Discography ==
- Recordando Tu Amor (1960)
- Sus Éxitos (1960)
- Este Es José Manuel Calderón (1962)
- Con la Misma Moneda (1966)
- José Manuel Calderón y Sus Éxitos (1966)
- Qué Será de Mi (Condena) (1968)
- El Romántico (1974)
- Más Éxitos de José Manuel Calderón (1980)
