= Güira =

Percussion instrument

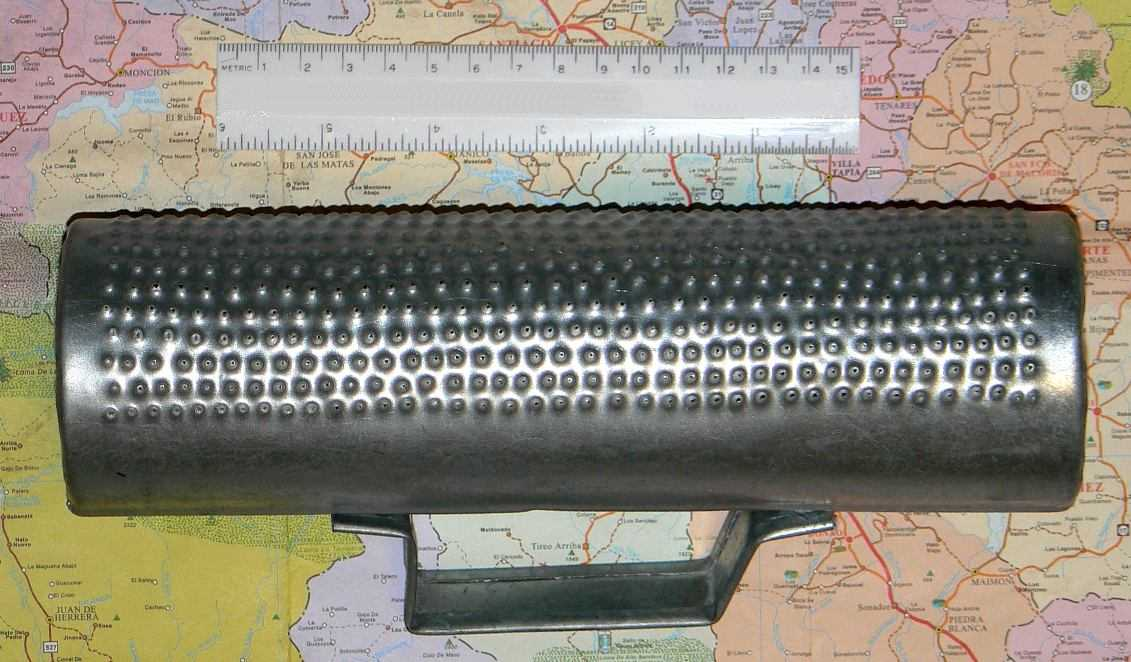

Percussion instrument
- Classification: Metal idiophone
- Hornbostel–Sachs classification: 112.23 (Scraped idiophone, vessel)

Playing range
- Speed of scrape produces some variation

Related instruments
- Güiro, guayo, reco-reco, quijada, guacharaca, washboard

The güira (Latin American Spanish pronunciation: [ˈɡwiɾa]) is a percussion instrument from the Dominican Republic used in merengue, bachata, and to a lesser extent, other genres such as cumbia. It is made of a metal sheet (commonly steel) and played with a stiff brush, thus being similar to the Haitian graj (a perforated metal cylinder scraped with a stick) and the Cuban guayo (metal scraper) and güiro (gourd scraper). Güira, guayo and güiro all have a function akin to that of the indigenous native maracas or the trap-kit's hi-hat, namely providing a complementary beat.

Performers on the güira are referred to as güireros and in merengue típico ensembles they often co-lead percussion sections along with tambora-playing tamboreros, due to the significance of their African-derived interlocking rhythms in providing a basic musical foundation for dance.

== Usage ==
The güira is most often found in merengue típico where it serves as one of multiple percussion instruments, most usually interlocking with the rhythm of the tambora, a fairly small horizontally mounted rustic drum normally played with one stick and one bare hand. Mastering its usual 'correct' playing techniques has been dubbed very challenging. Güireros may use a variety of playing techniques to play various rhythms, however nearly all playing is done with one hand only holding the instrument from its large rounded (to reduce hand fatigue) handle, while it is scraped with the other (dominant) hand holding the brush, which may be made for this purpose, but in practice is typically a metal-tined afro pick hair styling comb, although some players may use a cane- or plastic-toothed scraper.

Normally the güira consists of an open-ended tube with many sound-producing nodules protruding its outer (usual) playing surface. The body of the güira is generally some type of thin sheet steel. One commercial variant commonly called a torpedo is fully enclosed with tapered ends and is supplied with mineral or glass beads or metal shot inside to double as a shaker. Given its unwieldy shape and the additional weight of tapered ends and shaker fill, using a güira as a shaker may be impractical. Regardless of how it is used, its traditional main function is to propel the tempo, not only to add its uniquely swishy metallic timbre's sabor ("flavor").

Another key aspect of the güira is how much the (external) playing surface is (mostly internally, although flexibly using the holding hand and/or stuffing some light filler like felt or foam/fiber/excelsior inside) "dampened" (muted). This aspect influences how staccato or "dry" its sound will be, and advanced players may modulate muting while playing for additional timbral variation.

While the player holds the güira firmly with one hand while using the scraper with their dominant hand, the güira is usually brushed (lightly scraped transversely) steadily on the downbeat with a preceding "and-a" in its characteristic galloping figure; it is also sometimes played in more soloistic complex patterns that still generally mark the tempo. Modern cumbia also sometimes features a (metal-sided) güira instead of the traditional (gourd-bodied) guiro. Typical rhythmic patterns for cumbia include the golpe ("gallop").

Dances featuring the güira range from the fast-paced merengue típico or cibaeño (typical/traditional 2/2 time with accordion lead), perico ripiao (deriv. unclear; lit. "ripped parrot" or quick, bird-like) or merengue derecho ("straight-ahead merengue") to the slower pambiche or merengue pambichao (translit. Engl. "Palm Beach-esque" merengue), with tempos of 88 to 180 bpm. While its use in the more-romantic bachata (lit. "pierced" implying festooned with flowers) styles is applied at various medium to very fast tempos, modern güira has been used in a wide variety of dance styles, as its versatility and ability to "cut through" a dense sonic mix and thereby maintain a consistent dance tempo is similar to that of how hi-hat or shakers like maracas are employed.

== Craft ==
According to Francisco Javier Durán García, New York City based instrument maker, the traditional art of güira making involves a tree stump, hammer, nail, metal tube, and wood block. The instrument is hand fashioned from sheet metal into a (roughly 13 in (33 cm)) long cylindrical tube along with repeatedly-dimpled (not fully perforated) tubular (exterior) surface.

Güira sound
Brief sample of güira

== Comparison to the güiro ==
The Dominican güira is similar in usage to the Puerto Rican–Cuban güiro though of distinct timbre. Whereas the güiro is often a hollowed-out gourd, thus producing a more wooden tone, the metal construction of the güira gives it a characteristic metallic timbre.

== Cultural significance ==
The güira as part of the merengue típico is emblematic of Dominican heritage. It is estimated to be the most widespread instrument in the country. When Rafael Trujillo came to power in 1930 he made the music the national emblem.

The Dominican güira has also become the instrument of choice for non-Dominican styles of music in other countries. In Colombia for example, the güira has replaced the traditional wood “guacharaca” in modern vallenato music, specially during large live performances. Likewise, many “tropical” dance orchestras and bands in Colombia use the Dominican güira to play cumbia and other local popular styles. Much like the Cuban tumbadoras (congas) which have become the general all purpose instrument for dance music in Colombia (being added to the vallenato ensemble or even replacing traditional local drums in some cases during live performances of cumbia) the Dominican güira has also become a general all purpose scraped instrument for dance bands in Colombia.
