= Bachata (music) =

Music genre from the Dominican Republic

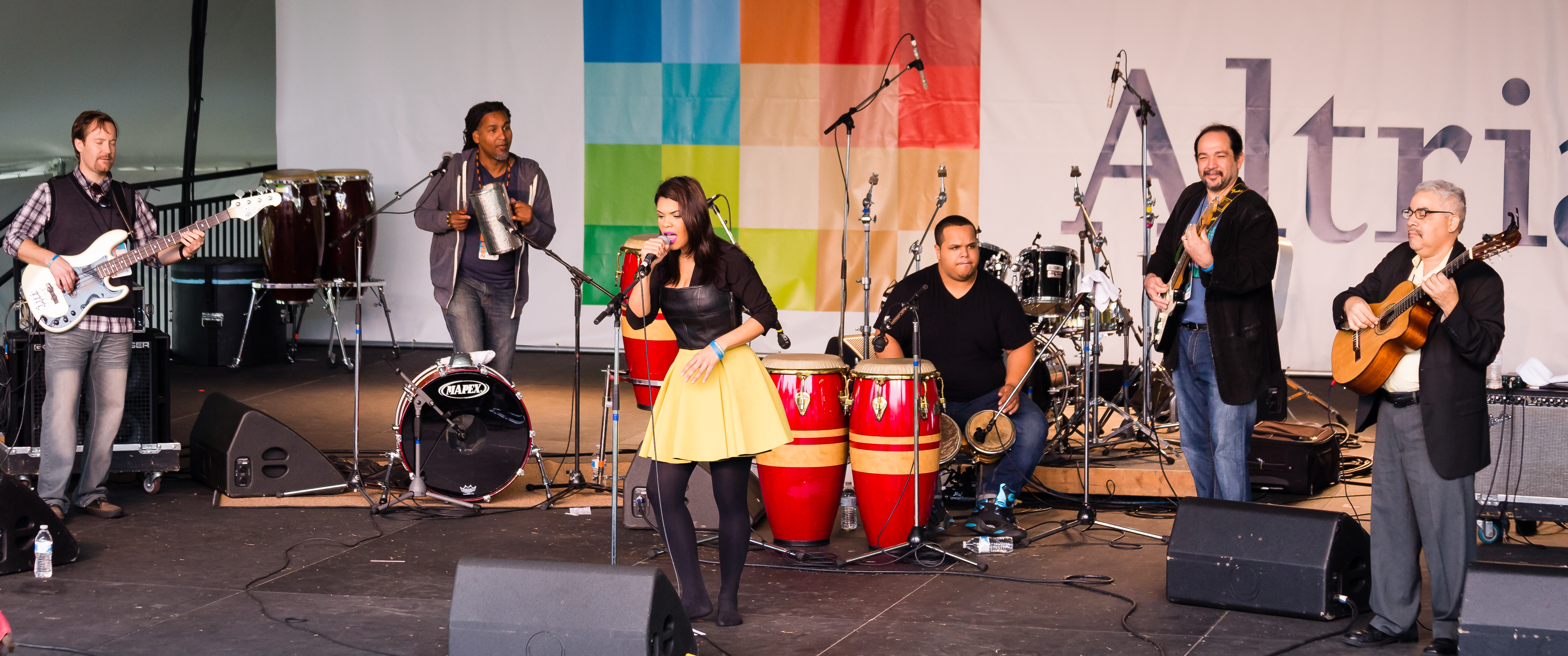
- Dominican folk bachata musicians - Amargue Bachata Quintet
- Cultural origins: Dominican Republic

Subgenres
- Traditional bachata; bachatón

Regional scenes
- Dominican Republic; Cuba; Puerto Rico; United States; Mexico; Curaçao; Panama; Chile; Colombia; El Salvador; Honduras; Venezuela; Guatemala; Nicaragua; Costa Rica; Ecuador

Other topics
- Merengue; Dominican Culture

Bachata is a genre of music that evolved in the Dominican Republic in the 20th century. It contains elements of European (mainly Spanish music), indigenous Taino and African musical elements, representing the cultural diversity of the Dominican population. A form of dance, bachata, also grew with the music.

In the 1990s bachata's instrumentation changed from the nylon string Spanish guitar and maracas of traditional bachata to the electric steel string and guira of modern bachata. Bachata further transformed in the 21st century with the creation of urban bachata styles by bands such as Monchy y Alexandra and Aventura. These new modern styles of bachata became an international phenomenon, and today bachata is one of the most popular styles of Latin music.

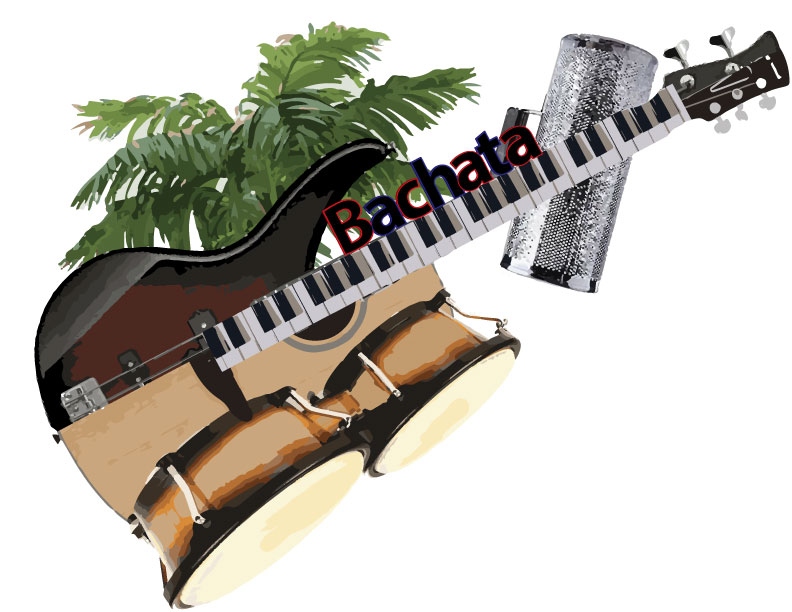
Instruments used in Bachata

The original term used to name the genre was amargue ("bitterness", "bitter music"), until the mood-neutral term bachata became popular. The genre mixed these and the troubadour singing tradition common in Latin America (and later, from the mid-1980s, merengue). The first recognised bachata recorded was composed by José Manuel Calderón in 1962 ("Borracho de amor").

"It has been compared to the blues in the past in terms of, structurally, the kind of folks who were making it, people on the margins of society. It's a little more cheerful, though, than the blues. Even songs where they're singing about the treachery of a woman ... if you just listen to them musically, they still sound kind of sweet."

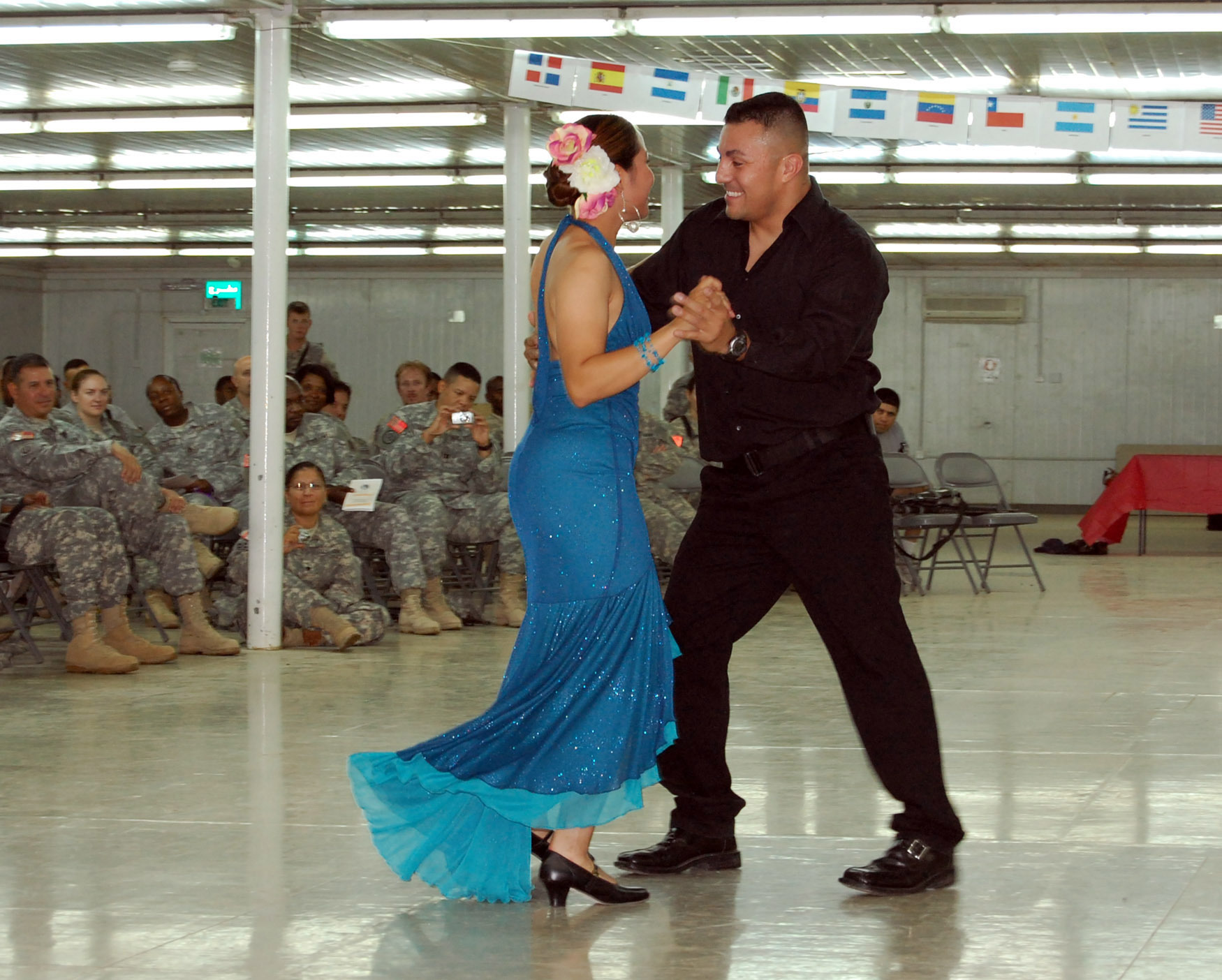
A couple dancing bachata

== Instrumentations ==
The typical bachata group consists of five instruments: requinto (lead guitar), segunda (rhythm guitar), bass guitar, bongos and güira. The segunda serves the purpose of adding syncopation to the music. Bachata groups mainly play lead guitar instrumentation using arpeggiated repetitive chords, a distinctive characteristic of bachata and other genres across Latin America like bolero, Son Jarocho, Sierreno and others, a more straightforward style is used in Bachata. When they change to merengue-based bachata, the percussionist will switch from a bongo to a tambora drum. In the 1960s and 1970s, maracas were used instead of güira. The change in the 1980s from maracas to the more versatile güira was made as bachata was becoming more dance oriented.

== History ==
Bachata arose in the poor and working-class areas of the country. During the 1960s and early 1970s, while bachata was known as amargue music, it was seen as music of the lower class by middle-upper-class Dominicans. The genre's popularity rose in the 1980s and early 1990s when the rhythm began to reach the mainstream media. The genre was declared an Intangible Cultural Heritage of humanity by UNESCO.

During much of its history, bachata music was disregarded by middle-upperclass Dominican society and associated with rural underdevelopment and crime. As recently as the 1980s, bachata was considered too vulgar, crude and musically rustic to be broadcast on television or radio in the Dominican Republic.

=== 1950s: Trujillo's dictatorship and the origins of bachata music ===
Although the first official bachata song was released in 1962, bachata music had already existed informally in el campo, the rural or countryside parts of the Dominican Republic where it originated. Prior to the 1960s, when Rafael Trujillo's dictatorship over the Dominican Republic was marked by heavy censorship, the word bachata referred to an impromptu party in el campo, characterized by its melancholy and bittersweet lyrics, singing, and dancing. Informal bachateros at the time were majority poor, working-class people and so was their audience. Given the initial demographics of bachata music's audience and musicians, Trujillo harbored negative emotions towards bachata music and stigmatized it. As a result, bachata became synonymous with poverty, delinquency, lack of education, and prostitution to the middle and upper-class Dominican society. Bachata was also referred to as música cachivache, or music of little worth, and música de guardia, or music for low ranking military and police men. Still, Bachata music prevailed through the 50s as poor, working-class people played bachata music in bars and brothels. Bachateros also participated in the informal music sector where they paid studios to record songs on records or vinyls and sold them to people and establishments for low prices. Establishments like colmados in el campo bought popular bachata recordings and played them on jukeboxes for their customers to listen to while shopping.

=== 1960s: Trujillo's death and the spread of bachata music ===
The 1960s signal the immense spread of bachata music—the decade saw the birth of the Dominican music industry and of the bachata music which would dominate it.

Following Trujillo's death and end of his dictatorship in 1961, there was an opening for bachata music within the music industry amidst the loosened restrictions. The end of Trujillo's dictatorship motivated people from el campo to migrate to Santo Domingo, the capital and largest city in the Dominican Republic—before then, strict migration policies prevented the movement of people within and outside the country. As people settled in the city, they continued to play Bachata music because it allowed them to express the struggle and poverty they experienced in the city. Along with Bachata's audience in the city, bachateros from el campo who also migrated to Santo Domingo took advantage of the city's growing music industry.

The music industry increased music production and broadcasting after the end of Trujillo's dictatorship. When it came to bachata music, music industry leaders began recording, producing, and broadcasting bachata songs as long as musicians had the financial means to pay for the service. Soon enough, José Manuel Calderón recorded the first official bachata songs released on 45 rpm and got air-time on the radio stations for select songs ("Borracho de amor" and "Que será de mi (Condena)"). Following Calderon's bachata debut, recordings by the likes of such as Rodobaldo Duartes, Rafael Encarnacion, Ramoncito Cabrera, El Chivo Sin Ley, Corey Perro, Antonio Gómez Sacero, Luis Segura, Louis Loizides, Eladio Romero Santos, Ramón Cordero were also released. Ramon Pichardo, an entrepreneur, offered bachateros the option to finance records—paying the service fee in installments—and publish them on a record label. Singers such as Melinda Rodriguez and Tatico Henríquez were a few of the rural artists who were able to take advantage of this opportunity and start careers in the Dominican music industry.

As studios began recording bachata music in the 1960s, bachata music listeners beyond the countryside were exposed to the music. Radio Guarachita, hosted by Radhamés Aracena in 1966, was the only radio station at the time that played and centered bachata music. Aracena broadcast popular bachata songs produced in the 60s and worked with bachateros to produce music. Listeners regarded Bachata music as a variant of bolero since the term "bachata" still referred to impromptu parties.

Even though Bachata music began to spread, anti-bachata sentiment from Trujillo's rule continued into the 1960s. A campaign ensued to brand bachata in this negative light. Middle and upper-class Dominican society denounced bachata, calling bachata music a form of cultural backwardness. Bachata music had lyrics with sexual meaning or references, which was frowned upon by middle-upper-class Dominicans because bachateros did not have academic backgrounds. Since Bachata music was not widely accepted by society for its "vulgar and sensual" nature, middle and upper-class people refrained from listening and dancing to Bachata music to protect their reputation. They attached a negative connotation to the word bachata and used it as an insult to the music.

=== 1970s–1980s: The continual growth of bachata music ===
The popularity of bachata music steadily rose during the 1970s and 1980s.

In the 1970s, bachata music was hardly played on radio stations other than Radio Guarachita and unmentioned on television and in print. Bachateros were also barred from performing in upper-class venues. Bachateros were barred from performing in high society venues. Even so, many Bachateros performed in bars, brothels, and small venues in poor city neighborhoods and el campo. Bachata music became known as la musica de amargue, or bitter music, because it was still influenced by despair, sex, and hardship, which only fueled anti-bachata sentiment in middle-upper-class Dominican society. Despite its unofficial censorship, bachata remained widely popular, while orchestral merengue benefited from the country's major publicity outlets.

By the 1980s, different styles of Bachata music began to appear. Blas Durán took la musica de amargue and "introduced musical innovations such as an electric rather than acoustic lead guitar, faster tempi, and multitrack recording." Durán was the first to record with electric guitar in his 1987 bachata-merengue song, "Mujeres hembras." Due to popular demand, more radio stations began playing bachata, and bachateros soon found themselves performing on television as well. Bachata style merengues, or guitar merengues, also began to appear. Other Dominican bachateros that emerged from this time period were Marino Perez, Silvestre Peguero, and Leonardo Paniagua. Beyond the Dominican Republic, Dominican people continued to migrate outside the Dominican Republic years after Trujillo's death, carrying bachata music with them where they went such as New York City.

=== 1990s–2000s: The acceptance of bachata music ===
Juan Luis Guerra played a pivotal role in bringing bachata music to an international audience, extending its reach beyond its Dominican Republic origins. The genre's rising global popularity was accompanied by a fresh, contemporary influence on its musical style. This evolution in bachata not only transformed its sound but also its associated dance form. Dance studios began to incorporate this modernized version of bachata, teaching enhanced techniques and more elaborate movement patterns, reflecting the genre's dynamic progression.

By the early 1990s, the sound was further modernized and the bachata scene was dominated by two new artists: Luis Vargas and Antony Santos. Both incorporated a large number of bachata-merengues in their repertoires. Santos, Vargas and the many new style bachateros who would follow achieved a level of stardom that was unimaginable to the bachateros who preceded them—they were the first generation of pop bachata artists. It was also at this time that bachata began to emerge internationally as a music of Hispanic dance-halls.

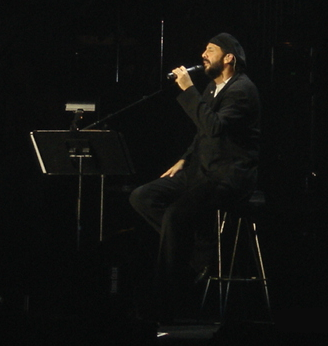
Dominican singer-songwriter Juan Luis Guerra

Juan Luis Guerra's Grammy-winning 1992 release, Bachata Rosa, is credited with making the genre more acceptable and helping bachata achieve legitimacy and international recognition. Although he used the word bachata in the album title, his songs have a more traditional bolero sound.

By the beginning of the 21st century, the bachata group Aventura had taken the bachata envisioned by Juan Luis Guerra in the early 1990s to new heights. Led by lead singer Anthony "Romeo" Santos, they revolutionized and modernized the genre. They sold out Madison Square Garden numerous times and released countless top ten hits on the hot Latin charts including two number one hits "Por un segundo" and "Dile al Amor". Other big bachata acts in the decade included "Monchy y Alexandra" and Los Toros Band.

=== 2010s–present ===
Today, parallel to bachata music, fusion genres arose in Western countries such as the US, combining some of the rhythmic elements of bachata music with elements of Western music such as hip hop, R&B, pop, techno and more. This fusion genre became popular among Western audiences, and often includes covers of Western pop songs played on MTV and non-Latin radio stations. Notable artists of the new fusion genre are Prince Royce, Xtreme, Toby Love, and Toke D Keda, among others. By 2011, former Aventura member Romeo Santos also joined the fusion bandwagon, releasing several new albums which became popular in the US and other Western countries. Not only has bachata's popularity changed but so has its lyrics; before the lyrics were mostly about a cheating relationship and hurt feelings but now it talks about love and is more romantic. According to Bachata: Música Del Pueblo ("Bachata: Music of the People") the writers said: "In the past decade, bachata has been transformed from a ballad-style guitar music of the rural poor in the Dominican Republic to the hottest new music in the international Latino music market."

== See also ==
- Latin Grammy Award for Best Merengue/Bachata Album
- Latin music
- Brown-eyed soul
