= Joan Soriano =

- Born: Juan Bienvenido Severino Soriano; February 23, 1972 (age 54); Monte Plata, Dominican Republic
- Genres: Bachata, Latin
- Occupations: Singer-songwriter, performance artist
- Instruments: Vocals, guitar
- Years active: 1982–present
- Label: iASO Records
- Website: www.iasorecords.com/artists/joan-soriano

Juan Bienvenido Severino Soriano (born February 23, 1972), known as Joan Soriano, is a Dominican bachata singer and guitarist from the Dominican Republic. His style is a blend of modern with traditional bachata. Since the 1980s, Joan's guitar and arrangements have graced many hit bachatas by other artists, and since 2008, he has begun to make a name for himself internationally.

== Early life ==
Soriano was born the seventh of fifteen children to Candelario "Candé" Severino Hernández and Juana María Soriano Moreno. "Born in the rural countryside near Santo Domingo in the Dominican Republic, Joan Soriano fashioned his first guitar from a tin can and fishing line and has never looked back." He created a family band with his siblings nicknamed "Los Candes," becoming a young star in the neighborhood. After Soriano mastered the style, the then 13-year-old traveled to Santo Domingo and started working as a session musician. Soriano's guitar playing has the clean, feathery sound typical of bachata music.

== Career ==
In 2010, Soriano released El Duque de la Bachata with iASO Records. The album was recorded live in Santo Domingo and NYC studios by iASO producer Benjamin de Menil. The album won the best World Beat Album of 2011 at the Indie Acoustic Project awards.

In 2011, Soriano, Aventura, and Monchy y Alexandra collaborated to produce a DVD breakdown of bachata. Released by iASO Records, the Bachata Breakdown En Vivo video and accompanying CD demonstrates bachata instrument by instrument, using the basic rhythms of Derecho, Majao, and Mambo.

In 2012, Soriano released the album La Familia Soriano, a collaborative project of Joan playing alongside his siblings produced by iASO Records. It debuted at #3 on the Billboard Tropical album chart.

In 2018, the album Bachata Haiti was released as the first recordings of Creole language bachata. The album features music sung in both Creole and Spanish and a group of Haitian-Dominican artists led by Joan Soriano. The project was developed as an alternative to media attention focusing on conflict when considering relations between the people of the Dominican Republic and Haiti.

== Discography ==
- Ladrona de Amor (2018)
- Me Decidi (2015)
- La Familia Soriano (2012)
- El Duque de la Bachata (2010)
- Rough Guide to Bachata (2006)
- Afro Bachata (2005)
- Vocales de Amor (1998)
- Joan Soriano aka El Duque en Pampers (1995)

== Filmography ==
- The Duke of Bachata (2009)
- Santo Domingo Blues (2005)
