= Leonardo Paniagua =

Dominican banchata musician (born 1945)

- Born: August 5, 1945 (age 81); Las Yayas, La Vega, Dominican Republic
- Genres: Bachata
- Occupations: Musician; Singer; Composer
- Instruments: Vocals; guitar
- Years active: 1970–present
- Labels: Discos Guarachita & Kubaney Records

Leonardo Paniagua (born August 5, 1945) is one of the Dominican Republic's most popular bachata musicians. He emerged from obscurity to overnight stardom in the 1970s, when he recorded his first 45 rpm record, "Amada, Amante" for Discos Guarachita.

== Biography ==
Throughout the 1970s and 1980s, Paniagua's bachata albums were the best-selling. With his soft voice and romantic style, he appealed beyond bachata's usual working-class audience. He was also one of the first artists to form a movement of romantic-bachateros, artists who helped the genre emerge into mainstream music. Some of his greatest hits include song like "Mi Secreto", "Ella Se LLamaba Marta", among others. It also included the song "Chiquitita" which is a bachata cover of a song by the Swedish pop-rock supergroup, ABBA.

Paniagua still tours and performs today in the US, Europe, and the Dominican Republic.

In 2018, He played with his orchestra at one of several inaugural events in Arecibo, Puerto Rico's well known Pulguero Bajo Techo. (Puerto Rico's largest roofed flea market) and at Stratford, CT on April 27, 2018.

== Albums ==
=== Studio ===
- Con El Conjunto Paredes (with El Conjunto Paredes) (1973)
1. El Casamiento
2. Dame la Mano
3. Tus Ojos
4. El Porcentaje
5. Déjame Si Estoy Llorando
6. Es Tu Día Feliz
7. Amor Por Ti
8. Regresa Corazón
9. Hoy Comprendí
10. Locura, Locura
- Vol. 2 (1976)
1. La Cruz del Olvido
2. Madre, Cuando Quieras Voy a Verte
3. Querida
4. Ven Te Quiero Todavía
5. Estoy Celoso
6. No Vendrás
7. Me Estoy Volviendo Tuyo
8. Mi Secreto
9. Cenizas
10. Amor Imposible
- Vol. 3: Sus Primeros Éxitos (1977)
1. Me Muero Por Estar Contigo
2. Si Yo Fuera Ese
3. Él o Yo
4. Mi Arbolito
5. Locuras Tengo de Ti
6. Por Esa Puerta
7. Si Ardiera la Ciudad
8. Los Hombres No Deben Llorar
9. Un Beso y Una Flor
10. Te Acordarás de Mi
11. Por el Amor de Una Mujer
12. Dios del Olvido
- Vol. 4 (with El Conjunto Paredes) (1977)
1. Nunca Más Podré Olvidarte
2. Olvidarte Nunca
3. Insaciable
4. Qué Será
5. Si Supieras
6. Te Extrañaré Por Siempre
7. Por Mi Orgullo
8. Alguien Como Yo
9. El Anillo
10. Tantos Deseos de Ella
11. Me Estoy Acostumbrando a Ti
12. Chirry
- Vol. 5 (with El Conjunto Paredes) (1978)
1. Brunilda
2. Sin Remedio
3. Por Culpa de Tu Amor
4. Recordando el Pasado
5. El Necio
6. Que Debo Hacer
7. En el Rincón Aquel
8. Vamos a Platicar
9. Yo Nací Para Quererte
10. Quiero Llorar
11. Amada Amante
- Leonardo Paniagua (1978)
1. Él
2. Nunca Supe la Verdad
3. De Rodillas
4. Cada Día Más
5. Para Bien o Para Mal
6. Noche Amarga
7. Ven a Mi
8. Entre Tu Amor y Mi Amor
9. A Tu Orden
10. Quien Lleva los Pantalones
- Vol. 6 (1979)
1. Pedacito de Mi Vida
2. Acaríciame
3. Querida Mía
4. Como Ayer Amantes
5. Yo No Me Muero
6. Sigue Con Tu Dinero
7. Páginas del Alma
8. Somos de los Dos
9. Algo de Mi
10. Olvida Tu Rencor
- Vol. 7 (1979)
1. Chiquitita
2. Amor de Llanto
3. No Te Olvides de Mi
4. Cómo Te Ha Ido
5. Bailando Con Otra
6. Dime Si Vendrás Esta Navidad
7. Sin Ti
8. Yo Soy Tu Hombre
9. Flor Sin Aroma
10. Te Quise Tanto
- Vol. 8: Navidades Con Paniagua (1979)
1. Navidad Con Navidad
2. El Tiempo Que Te Quede Libre
3. El Concón
4. Sin Derecho y Con Razón
5. Merengue de Navidad
6. Ven Llegando
7. Cierra los Ojos
8. Cuando Quieras Dejarme
9. Obsesión
10. Nació Jesús
- Vol. 9 (1980)
1. Mujer Borincana
2. Que Fui Tu Amor
3. Ya Me Olvidé de Ti
4. Presiento Que Muero
5. Toda Una Vida
6. Tu Nieto
7. Que Te Vaya Bien
8. Ya Se Fue
9. Amorcito De Mi Vida
10. De Carne y Hueso
- Vol. 10: Señor Paniagua (1980)
1. Amémonos
2. Quién Lleva los Pantalones
3. Salud Cariño
4. Cada Día Más
5. Él
6. A Tu Orden
7. A Media Noche
8. Mala, Muy Mala
9. De Rodillas
10. Para Bien o Para Mal
11. Homenaje a Nino Bravo
12. Domingo en la Tarde
- Vol. 11: Con Mariachi (1981)
1. Mi Amigo
2. Atrévete
3. Silencio
4. Voy a Perder la Cabeza Por Tu Amor
5. Vendaval Sin Rumbo
6. Desahogo
7. De Ti Mujer
8. Sera
9. Esta Sed Que Tengo
10. Que Se Mueran de Envidia
- Vol. 12 (with El Conjunto Paredes) (1982)
1. Yo Pago Esta Noche
2. Brindemos
3. Perdona
4. No Hay Nada Tan Hermoso
5. Hoy No Estoy Para Nadie
6. Regresarás
7. Rueda de Amor
8. Como Yo Te Amo
9. Cuatro Paredes
10. La Primera Página
- Vol. 13: En Acción (with El Conjunto Paredes) (1982)
1. Todo Se Derrumbó Dentro de Mi
2. Mientras Tanto
3. Mañana Sabré
4. Para Volverte a Ver
5. Como Es Posible
6. Que Quieres Tú de Mi
7. Una Más Allá
8. Si Te Digo Que Te He Olvidado
9. Amándote
10. Como Sufro al Recordar
- Vol. 14: 12 Éxitos Románticos Del Momento (1983)
1. Dueño de Nada
2. Que Tal Te Va Sin Mi
3. Me Basta
4. Con el Alma Desnuda
5. Para Vivir
6. Haz Amigo el Favor
7. Esa Mujer
8. El Amor
9. Si
10. Equivocada
11. Amargado Por Ti
12. Dime Papá
- Vol. 15: El Amargue (1983)
1. Nuestro Loco Amor
2. Yo Necesito Hablar Contigo
3. No Me Desprecies
4. Aunque No Te Puedo Hablar
5. Mujeres de Mi Pueblo
6. Desengañado
7. Súplica
8. Ahora Me Voy
9. Que Dios Te Aleje de Mi
10. Lágrimas Fingidas
- El Gusto Del Pueblo (1984)
1. María
2. Cóncavo y Convexo
3. Ella Se Llamaba Marta
4. Que Dios Te Aleje de Mi
5. Mi Vida
6. Te Vas
7. Tú Si Sabes Amar
8. Acuérdate
9. Tu Foto en la Pared
10. Cuando Tú No Estás
- Más Música Para El Pueblo (1985)
1. Me Tienes Que Recordar
2. Y Tú Te Vas
3. Feliz Su Cumpleaños
4. Volveré a Saludarte
5. Perdido
6. No Me Dejes de Querer
7. Lo Dudo
8. No Vales la Pena
9. Mis Ojos Dicen Que Te Quiero
10. Cómo Te Ha Ido
- Paniagua... De Nuevo! (1986)
1. De Corazón a Corazón
2. Me Enseñaste a Querer
3. Aprenderé a Soñar
4. No Me Pidas Que Te Olvide
5. Cariño (Honey)
6. Sabor a Mí
7. Gracias Mi Amor
8. Pena Por Ti
9. Tu Mirada Serena
10. Cara Bonita
11. De Ti Me Enamoré
12. Sueño Con Besar Tu Boca
- Prohibido (1988)
1. Prohibido
2. Me Enseñaste el Amor
3. Que No Se Rompa la Noche
4. Pueblo Lejano
5. Dos En Uno
6. Quien Puede Ser
7. Tu Sonrisa Me Provoca
8. No Me Explico
9. Plazos Traicioneros
10. José Luis
- Un Saludo a Puerto Rico (1989)
1. Mis Amores
2. Tu Juguetito
3. Preciosa
4. Sin Ti Soy Nada
5. Desde Que Yo Te Conocí
6. La Cama Vacía
7. Obsesión
8. La Última Copa
9. Sigamos Pecando
10. Cuando Tú No Estás
- Si Me Vas a Olvidar (1990)
1. Si Me Vas a Olvidar
2. Te Amo
3. A Donde Vayas
4. Me Recordarás
5. Quiero Hacerte el Amor
6. El Que Más Te Ha Querido
7. La Incondicional
8. Con Ella
9. Después de Ti
10. Te Dirán
- Por Ti Mi Amor (1991)
1. El Cariño Es Como Una Flor
2. Desencanto
3. Olvídate de Mi
4. Llorando Se Fue
5. Burbujas de Amor
6. Por Ti Mi Amor
7. Entre Copas
8. Dame Una Miradita
9. Crees Que Canto Por Ti
10. El Primero En Tu Vida

=== Greatest Hits albums ===
- 14 Éxitos (1987)
1. Dos Rosas
2. Chiquitita
3. Brunilda
4. De Corazón a Corazón
5. Sin Ti
6. Quien Lleva los Pantalones
7. Tantos Deseos de Ella
8. Un Beso y Una Flor
9. Nunca Más Podré Olvidarte
10. Si Ardiera la Ciudad
11. Desahogo
12. Quiero Llorar
13. A Media Noche
14. La Cruz del Olvido
