= List of merengue musicians =

The following is a list of notable musicians who do merengue music.

== Dominican and Caribbean ==
- Aguakate
- Elvis Crespo
- Fulanito
- Fefita La Grande
- Juan Espinola
- Juan Luis Guerra
- Ricardo Gutierrez
- Tatico Henriquez
- Julio Alberto Hernández
- Eddy Herrera
- La India Canela
- Krisspy
- Limi-T 21
- Ñico Lora
- Grupo Mania
- Kinito Mendez
- Omega
- Ramón Orlando
- Chichi Peralta
- Geovanny Polanco
- El Prodigio
- Milly Quezada
- Toño Rosario
- Francisco Ulloa
- Cuco Valoy
- Sergio Vargas
- Rubby Perez
- Wilfrido Vargas
- Johnny Ventura
- Fernando Villalona
- Grupo Climax

== Venezuelan merengue ==
- Los Cañoneros
