= Music of the Dominican Republic =

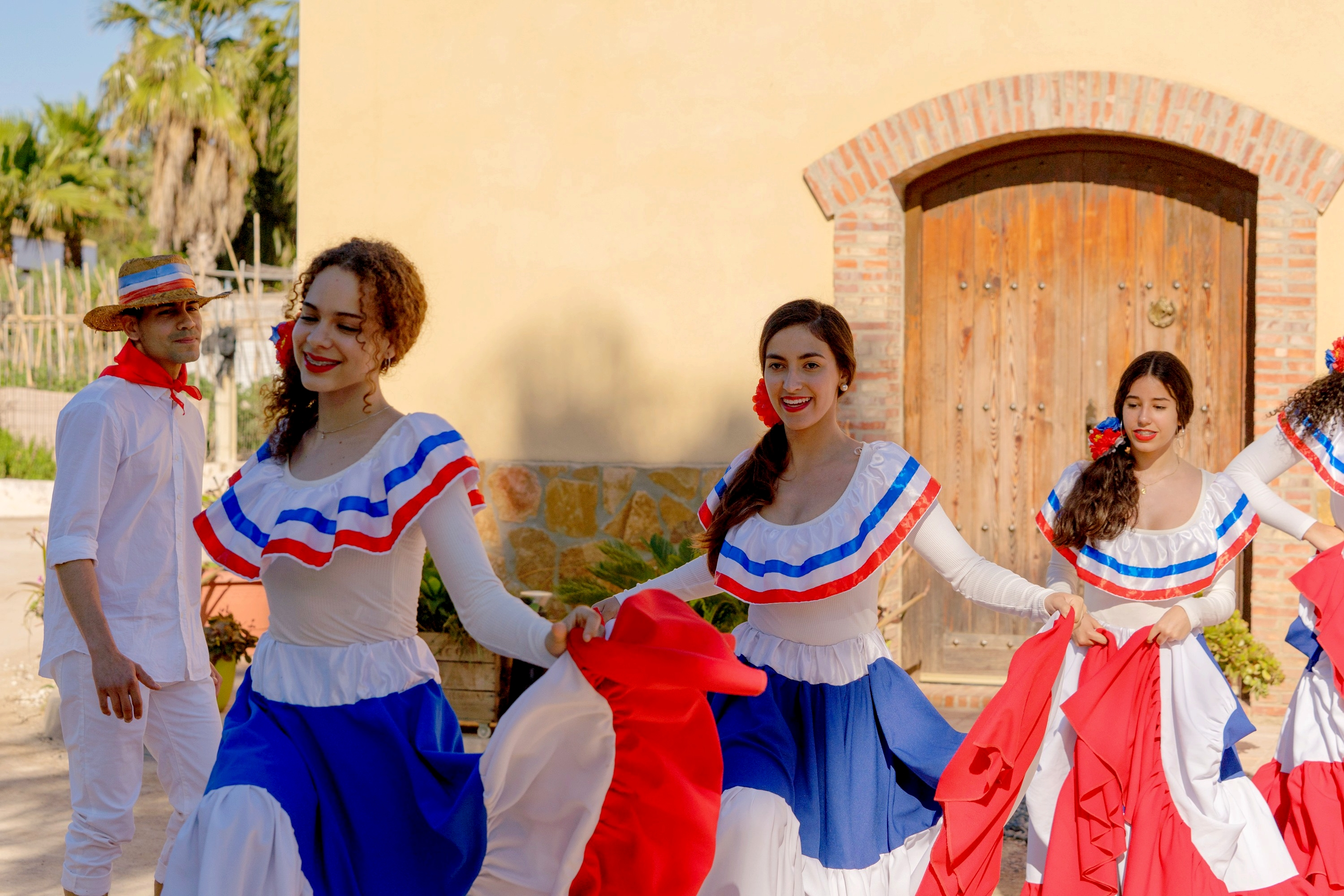
Dominicans dancing to Merengue music

The music of the Dominican Republic is primarily influenced by Western European music, with Sub-Saharan African and native Taino influences. The Dominican Republic is mainly known for its merengue and bachata music, both of which are the most famous styles of music in the Dominican Republic, and have been exported and popularized around the world.

== Dominican music ==
=== Merengue ===
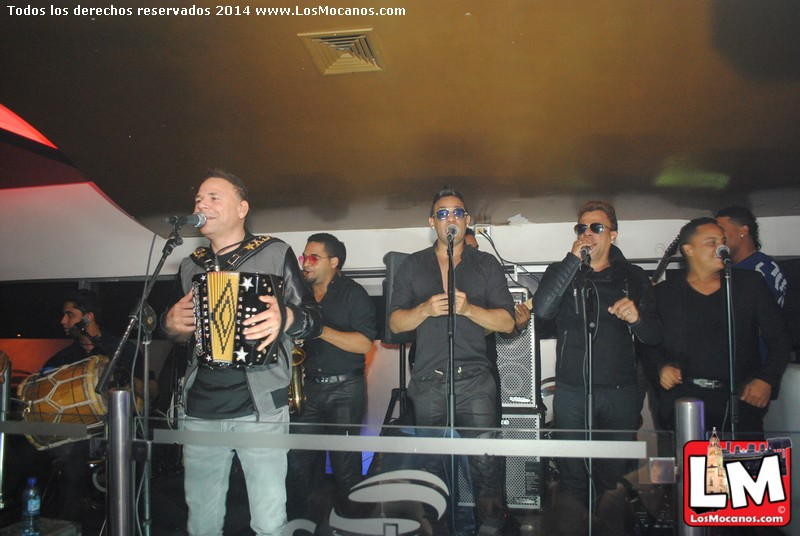
Dominican Republic traditional merengue artist El Prodigio

Merengue is a musical genre native to the Dominican Republic. It has a moderate to a very fast 2/4 rhythm played on güira (metal scraper) and the double-headed tambora. The accordion is also common. Traditional, accordion-based merengue is usually termed merengue típico and is still played by living accordionists like Francisco Ulloa, Fefita la Grande, El Ciego de Nagua, and Rafaelito Román. More modern merengues incorporate electric instruments and influences from Jazz, Blues, Soul, and rock and roll. Choruses are often sung in a call and response form by two or three back-up singers, or more traditionally, by the musicians playing tambora or güira. Beginning in the 1960s, dancing became a part of the singers' work with Johnny Ventura's Combo Show format, and is now a staple of many of the genre's biggest stars. Lyrically, irony and double entendres are common.

Merengue continued to be limited in popularity to the lower classes, especially in the Cibao area, in the early 20th century. Artists like Juan F. García, Juan Espínola and Julio Alberto Hernández tried to move merengue into the mainstream, but failed, largely due to social prejudices. Some success occurred after nationalistic feelings arose among the Cibao elite who resented the U.S. occupation of the country from 1916 to 1924. Legend has it that at this time the faster (merengue típico cibaeño) was slowed down to accommodate American soldiers who could not dance the difficult steps of the merengue; this mid-tempo version was called pambiche. Major mainstream acceptance started with Rafael Trujillo's rise to power in the early 1930s.

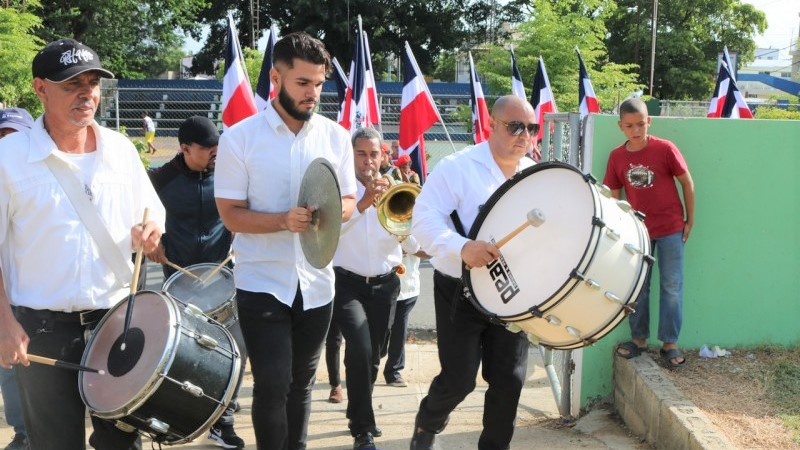
Dominican Republic music marching band

Dictator Rafael Trujillo, who seized the presidency of the Dominican Republic in 1930, helped merengue to become a national symbol of the island up until his assassination in 1961. Being that he was of humble origins, he had been barred from elite social clubs. He was therefore resentful of these elite sophisticates and began promoting the Cibao-style merengue, forcing all social classes to participate in the low-class dance. At Trujillo's command, virtually all musical groups had to compose merengues praising Trujillo's dictatorship, its guidelines and actions of his party. Trujillo even made it mandatory for urban dance bands to include merengue in their repertoire. Piano and brass instruments were also added in merengue-oriented big bands, a trend towards upward mobility popularizing by Luis Alberti's group in Santiago de los Caballeros. On the other hand, merengue that continued to use an accordion became known (rather disrespectfully) as perico ripiao ('ripped parrot'). It was because of all this that merengue became and still is the Dominican Republic's national music and dance.

In the 1960s, a new group of artists (most famously Johnny Ventura) incorporated American R&B and rock and roll influences, along with salsa music. The instrumentation changed, with accordion replaced with electric guitars or synthesizers, or occasionally sampled, and the saxophone's role totally redefined. In spite of the changes, merengue remained the most popular form of music in the Dominican Republic. Ventura, for example, was so adulated that he became a massively popular and influential politician on his return from a time in the United States, and was seen as a national symbol.

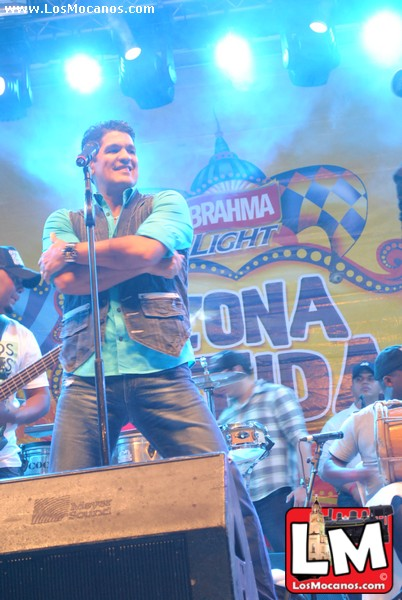
Dominican Republic merengue singer Eddy Herrera

The 1980s saw increasing Dominican emigration to Europe and the United States, especially to New York City and Miami. Merengue came with them, bringing images of glitzy pop singers and idols. At the same time, Juan Luis Guerra slowed down the merengue rhythm, and added more lyrical depth and entrenched social commentary. He also incorporated bachata and Western musical influences with albums like 1990's critically acclaimed Bachata Rosa.

=== Salves ===
Salve is a call-and-response type of singing that uses güira, panderos, palos (see next section) and other African instruments. Salves are highly ceremonial and are used in pilgrimages and at parties dedicated to voodoo saints. Salve is a ritual inspired by religion and music with roots in both African and Hispanic cultures. Salve is related to palo that is played in a lot of the same contexts and rhythm. The name comes from the Salve Regina, a Catholic hymn, and many still sing a sacred, a cappella salve that preserves the medieval modes of old Spanish hymns. The ecstatic salve played at religious parties, however, is all about percussion – featuring large numbers of tambourines playing interlocking rhythms and a melodic drum called the balsie, whose player alters the pitch by applying pressure with his foot. Salve may be played in fewer parts of the country but it is one of the best-known sounds, largely because it is the sound of choice in Villa Mella, a poor suburb of the capital often thought of as the epicenter of Afro-Dominican traditions. The salve group of Enerolisa Nuñez, from Villa Mella, is one of the most widely listened to - thanks to her inclusion in merengue-star Kinito Méndez's salve-merengue fusion album A Palo Limpio as well as an excellent recording of her group by the Bayahonda Cultural Foundation.

=== Palo ===
Palo, also known as "atabales" and "salves", is a Dominican sacred music that can be found throughout the island. The drum and human voice are the principal instruments. Palo is played at religious ceremonies – usually coinciding with saint's days – as well as for secular parties and special occasions. Its roots are in the Congo region, but it is mixed with European influences in the melodies. Palos are related to Dominican folk Catholicism, which includes a pantheon of deities/saints (here termed "misterios") much like those found in the Afro-American syncretic religious traditions of Cuba, Brazil, Haiti, Puerto Rico and elsewhere. Palos are usually associated with the lower class, Black and mixed populations. They can be seen in different regions of the island, but with variations.

Palo music is played on long drums called palos. The word palo means tree, and therefore all Dominican palo drums are instruments made from hollowed out logs. The head of the drum is made of cowhide and it is attached to the log portion with hoops and pegs in the Eastern region, or with nails in the Southwest. There is a master drum (palo mayor) which is a large, wide drum played with slimmer drums (alcahuetes) alongside: two in the East or three elsewhere. Palos are usually played with güiras, which are metal scrapers. They may also be played with maracas, or a little stick used to hit the master drum, called the catá. The Dominican region in which the palos are played determines the form, the number of the instruments, and how they are played.

Palos are associated with the Dominican brotherhoods called cofradías. Originally, the brotherhoods were composed solely of men. As time progressed, women and other family members maintained the brotherhoods and their heritage. Each brotherhood is devoted to a particular saint. Therefore, it is the responsibility of the brotherhood to honor the saint with a festival. Historically, cofradías were established on principles similar to those of the Mediterranean guild-based societies and those founded by Africans that inhabited southern Spain. Through colonization and the slave trade, these traditions were brought to the Dominican Republic. However, the cofradías are not limited to the Dominican Republic. They are found in other parts of the Americas as well, where they may be adapted to Native-American folk Catholicism, particularly in Mexico and Central America.

Palo music is generally played at festivals honoring saints (velaciones) or during other religious events, such as funerals. The configuration of instruments present depends on the region in which these events take place. Palo drums are played with the hands, held between the legs, and tied to the palero's waist by a rope. The three paleros each play a distinct beat on their palos, which ultimately blend together. These rhythms vary depending on the region as well. For example, in the East, the palo corrido rhythm is popular, while in San Cristóbal, one may be more likely to find the palo abajo rhythm. While they play their drums, one of the paleros simultaneously sings verses of a song. The surrounding audience often invokes spirits of ancestors or saints, and it is not unusual to encounter participants becoming possessed at these events.

=== Bachata ===
Bachata is a guitar-based genre that originated in the Dominican countryside and developed into a music style in urban Santo Domingo's shantytowns in the 1960s. The term bachata originally referred to informal gatherings in backyards. Early bachata drew influence from a wide range of Latin American genres, including Cuban bolero and son, Puerto Rican jíbaro music, Mexican corrido and ranchera, Colombian vals campesino and pasillo, and Dominican merengue. A typical bachata group features five instruments: the requinto (lead guitar), segunda (rhythm guitar), bass, bongos, and güira. Over time, the instrumentation has evolved, reflecting musicians' personal styles and the genre's development. Some have incorporated electric guitars, piano, saxophones, and additional percussion instruments like timbales.

In the 1970s and 1980s, bachata was dismissed by the Dominican elites due to its association with rural, working-class communities, its use of sexual innuendo, and the informal musical training of many performers. However, the release of Juan Luis Guerra's Bachata Rosa album in the early 1990s propelled bachata into the mainstream, eventually surpassing merengue in both popularity and album sales. Despite this, bachata flourished and has now gained worldwide acceptance. One of the most popular bands making bachata music was Aventura.

== Popular music ==
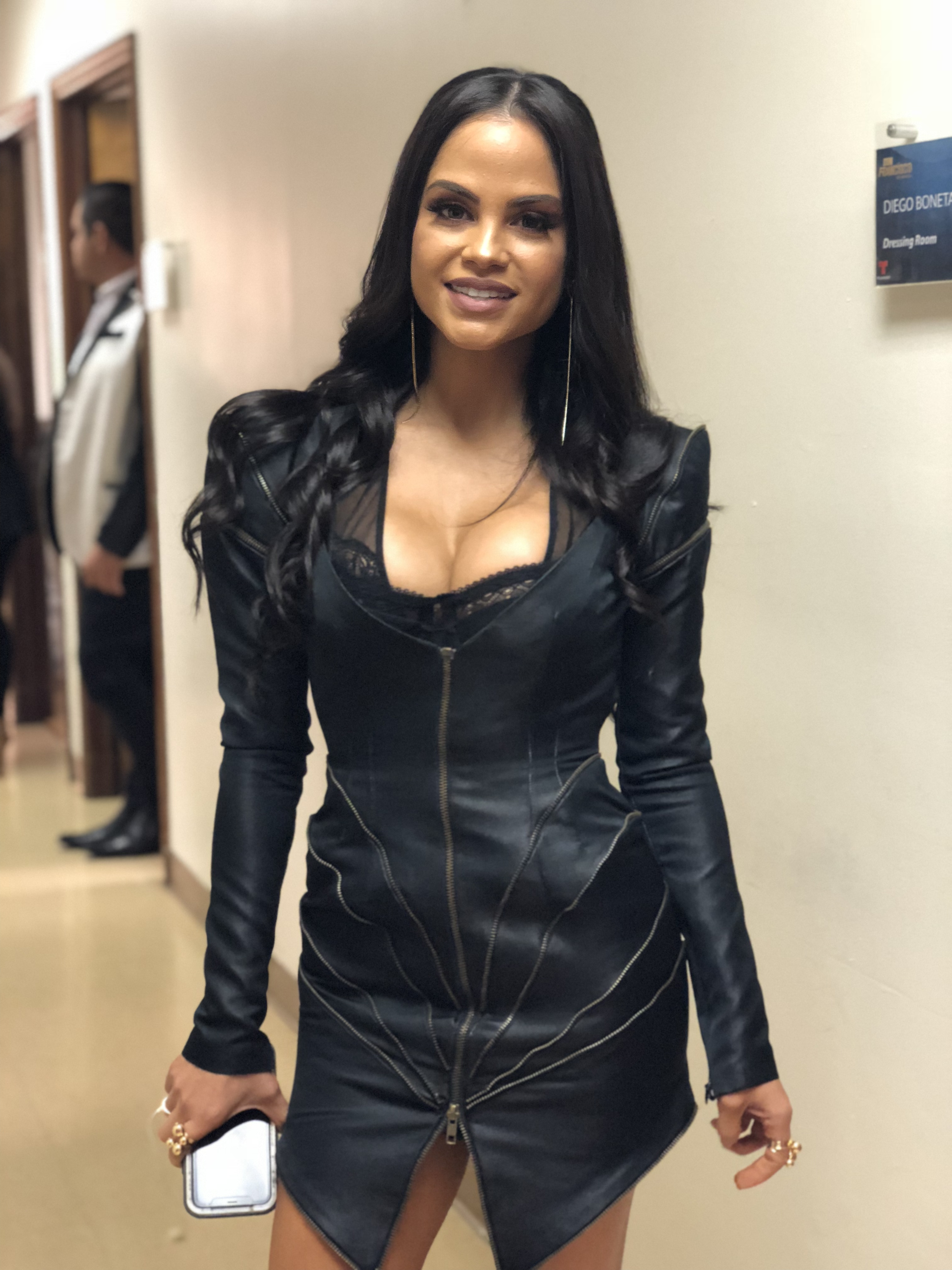
Natti Natasha

=== Dominican rock ===
Dominican rock is also popular among younger and older crowds of the Dominican Republic. Dominican rock is influenced by British and American rock, but also has its own sense of unique style. The rock scene in the Dominican Republic has been very vibrant in recent years, spanning many genres of rock such as pop rock, reggae/rock, punk, metal. Dominican rock had started its scene in the early 1980s, when Luis Días & Transporte Urbano, (who is considered to be the father of Dominican rock), came onto the scene and created this genre. Since then, there have been hundreds of Dominican rock bands, with the most successful being Toque Profundo, Cahobazul, Guaitiao, Tabu Tek, Al-Jadaqui Tribu del Sol, Joe Blandino, Edwin Amorfy, Vicente Garcia, Álex Ferreira, Top 40, TKR, Poket, La Siembra, La Reforma and others. Rita Indiana y los Misterios are a musical group known for their blend of traditional merengue music with rock. Bocatabu, Dronk, Futuros Divorciados and 42-01 are new Dominican rock groups who are also on the rise.

There are also several underground Metal concerts occurring occasionally mainly in the cities of Santo Domingo and Santiago, where teenagers and young adults usually not satisfied with the other genres express themselves.

=== Hip-hop ===
Hip-hop is a cultural movement developed in New York City in the 1970s primarily by African Americans and Afro-Latinos. Since first emerging in The Bronx and Harlem, the lifestyle of hip-hop culture has today spread around the world. One of the places hip-hop spread to was the Dominican Republic. The four historic elements of hip-hop are:

Gaudy Mercy (2016)

- MC'ing (rapping) ;
- DJ'ing;
- urban inspired art/tagging (graffiti); and
- b-boying (or breakdancing).

All these elements have been carried on into the Dominican Republic since the mid 80s by young immigrants who returned to their mother land, usually from Puerto Rico, New York, Boston and Florida. Dominican hip-hop started to gain national popularity in the mid-2000's.

=== Dembow and Reggaeton Dominicano ===
Even though reggaeton originated with reggae en español in Panama and gradually evolved to reggaeton in Puerto Rico, the Dominican Republic was the third country in Latin America to which reggaeton was introduced. It has had a long history of reggaeton music, more closely associated with Puerto Rican music.

Dominican dembow is formed by making the dembow rhythm faster, louder, simplified and more repetitive. Dominican recording artists include Black Point, Messiah El Artista, Monkey Black, Mozart La Para, Makleen, Juancho and Reychesta of Tres Coronas, Sensato del Patio, Rochy RD, El Alfa, Chimbala and Don Miguelo.

Some artists in reggaeton include Luny Tunes, who are one of the biggest and most popular producers in the genre, and have produced big hit reggaeton songs such as Daddy Yankee's smash hit "Gasolina", among other chart toppers. Some reggaeton artists are of Dominican descent, or by association like Ozuna (Half Dominican Half Puerto Rican), Arcángel & De La Ghetto (Both Half Dominican), Nicky Jam (Half Dominican).

== Art music ==
=== Jazz ===
The most renowned exponent is Michel Camilo.

=== Classical music ===
Conservatorio Nacional de Música is the academy of music of the Dominican Republic. It was founded by José de Jesús Ravelo (Don Chuchú), one of the main Dominican composers.

== Awards ==
The Dominican Republic has built a reputation for its vibrant musical culture and the awards systems that acknowledge and celebrate its artists' achievements, a country known worldwide for genres like merengue, and bachata. Its musicians have made a lasting impact on global music, from the 1930s-60s with the assuming leadership of Rafael Trujillo, to the 1990s with "New York audiences" welcoming the genre. Among its most recognized figures is Juan Luis Guerra, whose blend of merengue, bachata, and poetic lyricism has earned him international acclaim, having over 31 winning awards and 57 nominations between Grammys and Latin Grammys as of 2025.

== Bibliography ==
- Larrazábal Blanco, Carlos. 1967. "Los negros y la esclavitud en Santo Domingo". Santo Domingo: Postigo. Colección "Pensamiento Dominicano," No. 35.
- Brill, Mark. Music of Latin America and the Caribbean, 2nd Edition, 2018. Taylor & Francis ISBN 1138053562
- Davis, Martha Ellen. "Afro-Dominican Religious Brotherhoods: Structure, Ritual, and Music." 1976. Ph.D. dissertation in anthropology, University of Illinois
- Díaz Díaz, Edgardo. 2008. “Danza antillana, conjuntos militares, nacionalismo musical e identidad dominicana: retomando los pasos perdidos del merengue.” Latin American Music Review 29(2): 229–259.
- Manuel, Peter, Kenneth M. Bilby, and Michael D. Largey. Caribbean Currents: Caribbean Music from Rumba to Reggae. Philadelphia: Temple University Press, 1995.
- Harvey, Sean and Sue Steward. "Merengue Attacks". 2000. In Broughton, Simon and Ellingham, Mark with McConnachie, James and Duane, Orla (Ed.), World Music, Vol. 2: Latin & North America, Caribbean, India, Asia and Pacific, pp 414–420. Rough Guides Ltd, Penguin Books. ISBN 1-85828-636-0
