= Fefita la Grande =

Dominican merengue accordionist and singer (born 1943)

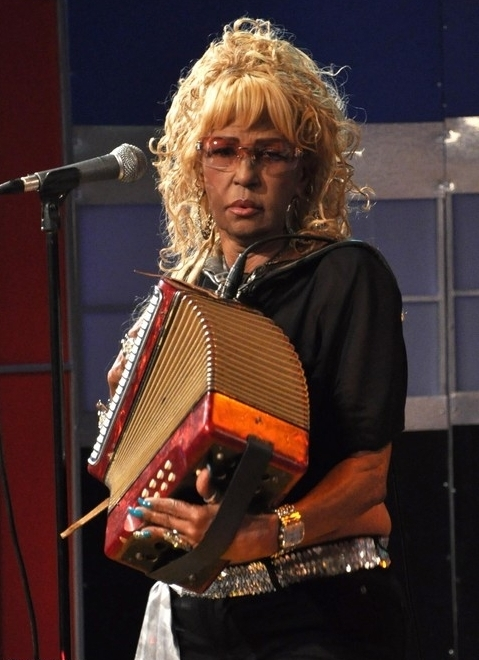
- Fefita la Grande, playing the accordion in 2010

Background information
- Also known as: La Mayimba
- Born: Manuela Josefa Taveras Cabrera; September 18, 1943 (age 83); Sabaneta, Dominican Republic
- Genre: Merengue
- Occupations: Singer, accordionist and composer
- Instruments: Accordion vocals
- Years active: 1950s-present

Manuela Josefa "Fefita" Taveras Cabrera (Note: Surnames swapped due to her father, Eliseo, not recognizing her legally upon her birth.) (born September 18, 1943), known by her stage name Fefita la Grande, is a Dominican accordionist and performer of merengue tipico, a rural variation of merengue, the main musical genre of the Dominican Republic.

She is one of the best-known musicians of the genre, along with artists such as Tatico Henríquez, Pedro Reynoso, El Ciego de Nagua, Francisco Peralta, Rafaelito Román, Francisco Ulloa, among others. Her popular songs include: Vamos Hablar Ingles, La Pimienta es la Que Pica, La Chiflera, O te Menea O te Apea, among others.

== Biography ==
Manuela Josefa Taveras Cabrera was born on September 18, 1943, in the small village of El Oregano, in San José, in the town of San Ignacio de Sabaneta, in the province of Santiago Rodríguez in the Dominican Republic, to Eliseo "Seíto" de Jesús Cabrera Fernández, and María Ana Taveras. Fefita has one full sister, María Celeste, and six half-siblings from her father. She took her mother's surname at birth because her father did not initially recognize her. From a very young age she began to be interested in music by playing the accordion inside her father's workshop. She was motivated to play the accordion after listening to the songs of Guandulito, one of the pioneers of merengue tipico.

At the age of seven, she was already known in her community for her talent as an accordionist. At nine she already entertained parties with the accordion, güira and tambora. In the mid-1950s, due to her talent and charisma, she was approached by José "Petán" Arismendy (brother of dictator Rafael Leónidas Trujillo) who, upon hearing her play, took a hundred pesos out of his pocket and gave them to Fefita, who was barely twelve years old.

Her stage name was adopted overtime; she was given the name "La Vieja Fefa" by Tatico Henríquez when she was 17 years old and Bartolo Alvarado "El Ciego de Nagua" baptized her with the name "Fefita La Grande" when she was about 22 years old. Since 1980, she has been called "La Mayimba", the name she likes the most.

Years later she traveled abroad accompanying the teacher Rafael Solano on one of his tours of Puerto Rico and later to other countries. She was the first Dominican artist to bring typical merengue to Europe. At the same time she began career with her first LP "Si quiere venir que venga", although already by that time Fefita had a wide musical repertoire and enjoyed great acceptance by the public. She has performed merengues by many authors, including her father Don Seito, as well as compositions whose melody and lyrics are her own.

All her life she maintained a unique style when playing the accordion, her merengues are similar to those of Tatico Henríquez or El Trío Reynoso, which maintain the essence of the original typical merengue and enramada music. She has criticized in interviews the contemporary merengueros who, according to her, have deformed the merengue "accelerating it and killing it by touching it in a strange way."

She is a survivor of breast cancer.

== Innovations and style ==
Cabrera had a unique style of playing merengue tipico, a kind that only she was able to produce. Along with the early exponents of "new" merengue tipico, such as Tatico Henriquez, Samuelito Almonte, and El Ciego de Nagua, she added congas, saxophones, and electric bass to the tipico ensemble, which was originally composed of three musicians: an accordionist (using a diatonic 2-row accordion), a tambora player ("tamborero"), and güira player ("guirero"). She was also the first to bring merengue tipico to European audiences.

== Collaborations ==
Cabrera's success is also partially achieved because of her ability to stay with the times and constantly reinvent her sound with the help of new tipico artists. Performing with the likes of Krisspy and El Prodigio, she continues to appeal to the young and also Película Perico Ripiao. In 2019, she teamed up with other Dominican merengue singers Milly Quezada and Maridalia Hernández for "La Pimienta Es La Que Pica".

== Discography ==
- La Ciudad Corazón (2001)
- Date Brillo Cadenita (1999)
- Soy Original (1997)
- Yo Sigo Pa' Lante (1995)
- Todos los Hombres Son Buenos (1993)
- Cantando He de Morir (1991)
- Vámonos Pa'l Can (1990)
- La Cintura Mía (1989)
- Fefita la Grande (1981)
- La Pimienta Es la Que Pica (1980)
- Merengues Típicos (1980)
- Merengues Típicos Vol. 1 (1979)

== See also ==
- Merengue tipico

== Sources ==
- iASO Records - Fefita La Grande Bio
- Short biography of Fefita
- Biography from www.afropop.org
- Hutchinson, Sydney. 2016. "Fefita the Great." In Tigers of a different stripe: Performing gender in Dominican Music. University of Chicago Press. ISBN 978-0226405469

Specific
