= Mama Juana =

Drink from the Dominican Republic

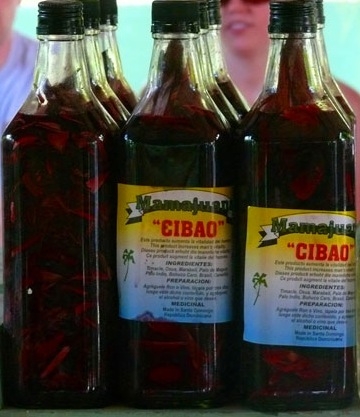
Bottles of Mamajuana

Mama Juana (or Mamajuana) is a spiced alcoholic beverage made by infusing a mixture of rum, red wine, and honey with tree bark and herbs. The taste is similar to port wine and the color is a deep red. It originates in the Dominican Republic.

The specific herbs that make up Mamajuana were originally prepared as an herbal tea by the native Taíno; post-Columbus, alcohol was added to the recipe.

== Etymology ==
The term Mama Juana has the same French origins as the English word demijohn, which refers to a large squat bottle with a short narrow neck, usually covered in wicker. It is thought to be derived from the French Dame Jeanne (Lady Jane), a term still used to describe this type of bottle. In the Spanish-speaking countries, Dame Jeanne was transformed into "damajuana", or Dama Juana and later, in the Dominican Republic, into Mama Juana (mother Jane). There are many different variations of recipes to make Mamajuana, since the name refers to the container or bottle originally used to prepare and store the maceration, rather than to the finished product itself.

== History ==
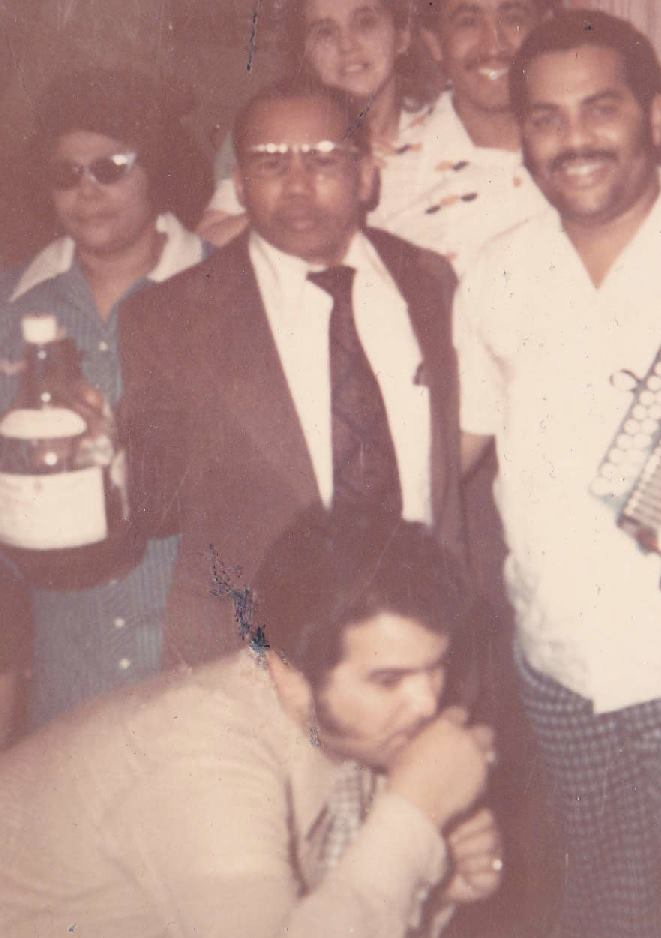
Rodriguez (left) and Tatico Henriquez (right) holding a glass jug of home-made Mama Juana

Mama Juana juices is considered one of the first distilled spirits in the Americas, even before rum, considering that early Spanish explorers mixed European alcohol with the Taínos' herbal tea; this combination created the first Mama Juana.

During the dictatorship of Rafael Trujillo, the sale of Mama Juana was prohibited, except by those with a medical license.

Mama Juana was popularized as a local herbal medicine and aphrodisiac in the 1950s by Jesus Rodriguez, a native of San Juan de la Maguana. Rodriguez would commute with others in trucks to Barahona, Azua, Pedernales, and many other provinces in the Dominican Republic to collect the stems needed to create the drink. Rodriguez eventually would be known under the moniker "Mama Juana" by many of the locals, as well as Tatico Henriquez and other merengue típico artists, such as Trio Reynoso and El Cieguito De Nagua, who were close friends of Rodriguez.

Another notable Mama Juana drinker was Porfirio Rubirosa, the famous Dominican playboy, polo player, race-car driver, and secret agent.

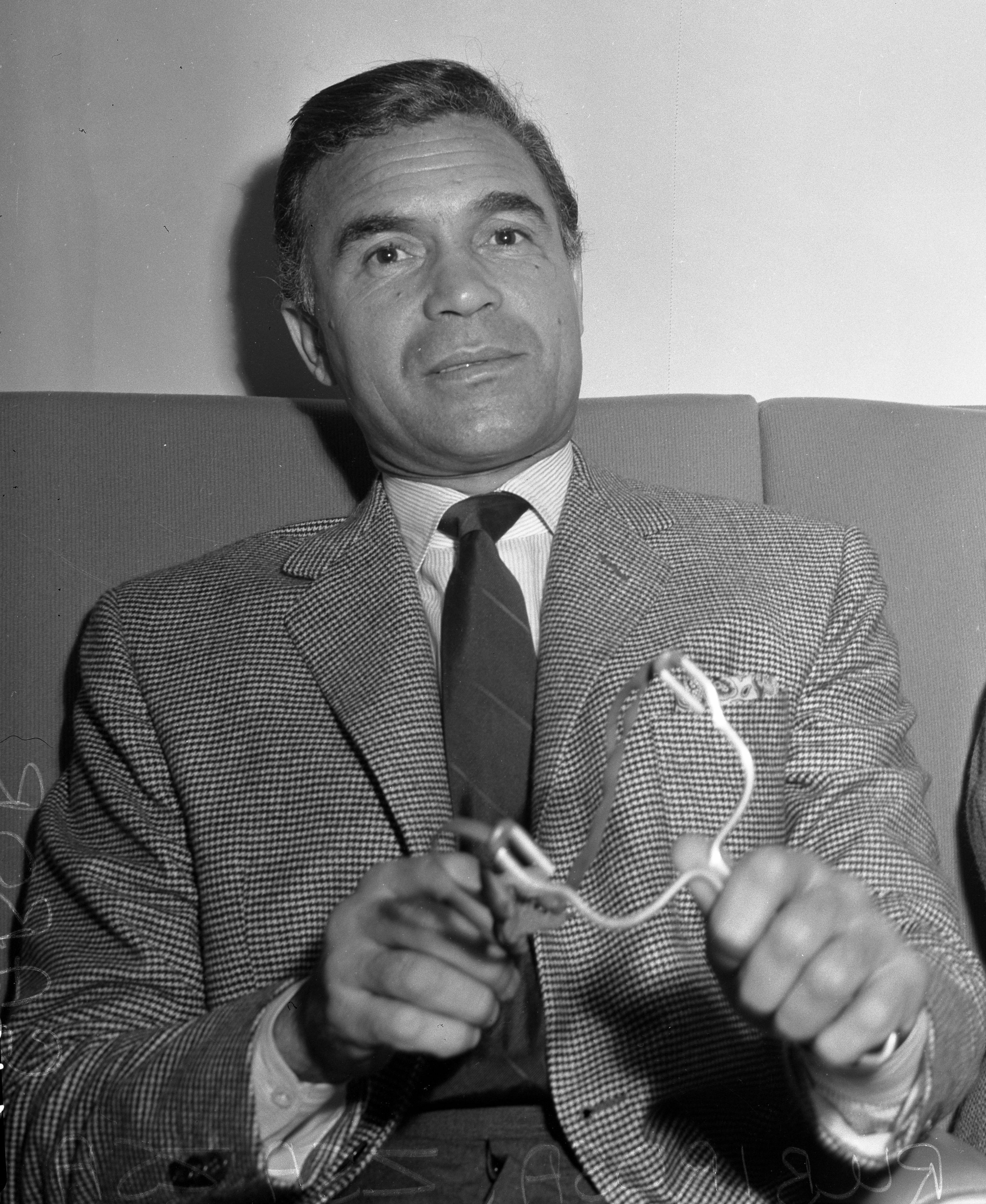
Dominican playboy, Porfirio Rubirosa

== Preparation ==
Mama Juana is a mixture of bark and herbs left to soak in rum (most often dark rum but the use of white rum is not uncommon), red wine and honey. The solid ingredients (local leaves, barks, sticks and roots) vary from region to region but usually include some of the following:

- Anamú (Petiveria alliacea)
- Anis estrellado (star anise, Illicium verum)
- Bohuco pega-palo (Cissus verticillata)
- Albahaca (basil, Ocimum basilicum)
- Canelilla (Cinnamodendron ekmanii)
- Bojuco caro (princess vine)
- Marabeli (Securidaca virgata)
- Clavo dulce (whole clove)
- Maguey (Agave spp.) leaves
- Timacle (Chiococca alba)

In addition to the above standard recipe, it is common for individuals to add other ingredients such as cinnamon, raisins, strawberry, molasses, and lemon or lime juice. Some recipes are said to include grated tortoiseshell, or sea turtle penis shaft for aphrodisiac effect. The concoction is usually kept at room temperature and served in a shot glass.

== Consuming ==
Mamajuana is available in three varieties:

- Prepackaged dry ingredients, which the customer cures and macerates
- Ready to drink, including the ingredients in the bottle
- Ready to drink, filtered and bottled

The most common way of consuming mamajuana in the Dominican Republic is neat (straight up) or as a room-temperature shot.

With the popularization of ready-to-drink brands, there has been a growing interest for mamajuana amongst mixologists. Many bars, restaurants and other on-premise establishments now offer mamajuana recipes in their beverage programs.

Besides the Dominican Republic, there has also been an increase in mamajuana consumption in Miami, New York, New Jersey, Pennsylvania, Maryland, Spain, Norway, Germany, Portugal, Chile, Cuba and Perú. With the introduction of commercial brands Mamajuana is becoming known worldwide.

== Commercial production ==
While mamajuana is traditionally prepared at home by macerating rum with local herbs, roots, and spices, several companies now produce standardized, ready-to-drink versions for domestic sale and international export. Commercial brands include:

Candela Mamajuana – A botanical rum produced in the Dominican Republic that uses the traditional mamajuana recipe. Made with native botanicals and aged rum. It is commercialized in retail stores such as Total Wine & More, Big Daddy's Liquors, and online

Karibik Mamajuana – A producer of herbal mamajuana liqueurs for both local consumption in the Dominican Republic and international customers. It is frequently cited in travel and cultural guides covering Dominican spirits.

Don Ramón Mamajuana – A commercially bottled interpretation of mamajuana noted in guides to Dominican beverages. The brand produces ready-to-drink mamajuana derived from the traditional mixture of roots and spices.

Casa Mamajuana – A producer that markets mamajuana-style herbal liqueurs within the Dominican Republic and abroad.
