= Francisco Ulloa (accordionist) =

Dominican musician

- Occupation: Accordionist
- Known for: Merengue tipico

Francisco Ulloa is a merengue accordionist, specializing in merengue típico. He is known for his skill and improvisation technique on the accordion, and started his career around the same time as Tatico Henriquez, whom some consider to be the godfather of merengue tipico, in the 1970s. He currently resides in Santiago, Dominican Republic. He plays at private festivals, concert halls at home, and also those abroad. His sound would be considered more similar to Fefita la Grande or Agapito Pascual rather than El Prodigio or Grupo Aguakate. Also famous for his work with Juan Luis Guerra on songs like El farolito and La cosquillita.

== Discography ==
- El Baby Vol. 1 (1970)
1. Pa' Tumbar la Mala Maña
2. Tú Eres la Que Sabe
3. La Media Vuelta
4. Milagrito
5. La Nochebuena
6. Si una Mujer Se Me Va
7. La Mala Maña en Bachata
8. Roximary
9. El Tabaco
10. Agua de Cubo
11. La Chiflera (1979)
1. Todo Para Ti
2. No Voy a Llorar
3. Y Yo Esperando
4. La Chiflera
5. Los Saxofones
6. Abusadora
7. Vuelve Corazón
8. Ayúdame
9. El Forastero
10. Me Llaman Chú
- Ahora Vengo Más Fuerte (1979)
1. Ahora Vengo Más Fuerte
2. Poza del Castillo
3. Volvamos a Querernos
4. Dulce Amor
5. Mi Prenda Adorada
6. El Tanque de Guerra
7. Río Rebelde
8. Dentro de Mi Alma
9. Amor Bonito
10. Fiesta de Acordeón
- Divina Qué Linda Eres (1979)
1. El Hombre Tuyo Soy Yo
2. El Tornillo
3. India de los Ojos Verdes
4. Consagración del Cariño
5. Cuando Te Enamoro a Ti
6. Divina Qué Linda Eres
7. Piedras en Mi Camino
8. La Carta
9. Cuando Me Acuerdo de Ti
10. Mi Suegra
- El Machazo del Merengue (1979)
1. El Hombre Tuyo Soy Yo
2. El Tornillo
3. India de los Ojos Verdes
4. Consagración de Cariño
5. Cuando Te Enamoro a Ti
6. Divina Que Linda Eres
7. Piedras En Mi Camino
8. La Carta
9. Cuando Me Acuerdo de Ti
10. Mi Suegra
- La Tijera (1980)
1. La Tijera
2. Así Como Tú
3. San Francisco
4. Celos Sin Motivos
5. La Última Moda
6. Mañana Me Voy de Aquí
7. María Dolores
8. Homenaje a Bolo
9. Ramonita
10. El Pajarito
- Eladio Romero Santos Presenta a Francisco Ulloa y el Conjunto San Rafael (1981)
1. La Cosquillita
2. Que Cosita
3. Dentro de Mi Corazón
4. Amor Bonito
5. Me Quiero Casar
6. Río Rebelde
7. El Tanque de Guerra
8. El Alicate
9. Ay Mamá
10. Francisco No Llora
- Francisco Ulloa y el Conjunto San Rafael (1981)
1. Bajo un Palmar
2. Burrito Sabanero
3. Hatillo Palma
4. Hasta el Río Fuimos Juntos
5. Quien Me la Entretiene
6. Sufriendo Así
7. No Me Dejes Solo
8. La Vida
9. Candelo
10. Te Busco Vida Mía
11. Homenaje a Monción
- Homenaje al Gran Tatico Henríquez (1983)
1. La Mecedora
2. Nonito en la Loma
3. Mi Prenda Querida
4. Acordándome de Ti
5. Recuerdo a Tatico
6. María la del Padre
7. Detrás de la Maya
8. La Cartera Vacía
9. Siempre Te Recuerdo
10. La Rubia
- ¡Merengue! (1987)
1. La Tijera
2. Agua de Tu Fuente
3. La Situación
4. El Beso Robado
5. Tongonéate
6. Ramonita
7. Mañana por la Mañana
8. Los Caballos
9. Linda Mujer
10. Lucas y Radhamés
11. La Lengua
12. San Francisco
13. Homenaje a Bolo
- ¿Qué? ¡Aha! La Mujer de Antonio (1988)
1. La Mamila
2. ¿Qué? ¡Aha! La Mujer de Antonio
3. Bambara Qui, Qui
4. La Paloma
5. La Tranca
6. El Pegao
7. El Puente Seco
8. Chupa Que Chupa
9. El Lío
10. Bolívar Peralta
- ...Y los Mosquitos Pullan (1989)
1. El Muchachito
2. El Alicate
3. Cumandé
4. Recuerdo a Mi Padre
5. La Porfía
6. Río Soquí
7. La Falda y el Rajaito
8. Los Mosquitos Pullan
9. Yo la Paso Bien
10. El Lamento
- En New York (1990)
1. La Muerte de Tite
2. Con la Misma Piedra
3. Violencia
4. Tatico Llorando
5. Mosaico Típico
6. La Carta
7. Aridio Espinal
8. Las Dos Mujeres
9. Recordándome de Ti
10. El Telefonema
- El Chucuchá (1990)
1. El Chucuchá
2. Vámonos Pa' Nagua
3. Nada Más Pensando en Ti
4. La Pava
5. La Cieguita Mía
6. La Cruz de Oro
7. Millonario de Amor
8. El Gallo Peleao
9. Chichí Mamá
10. La Encontré Llorando
11. La Plata
- Vol. 2 (1991)
1. Y Qué Será
2. Para Toda la Vida
3. La Distancia Entre los Dos
4. Corazón Bendito
5. Mujer Ingrata
6. Me la Voy a Llevar
7. El Picotiao
8. Mi Pensamiento
9. Mi Acordeón
10. Mi Morena
- ¡Ultramerengue! (1992)
1. Arturo Pa'l Monte
2. Dominga Qué Linda Eres
3. Majando
4. La Carta
5. Hoy Que He Vuelto a Recordar
6. Homenaje a Dany Cabrera
7. La Negra Tomasa
8. Si Tu Padre Te Abochorna
9. Ay Mami
10. Juanita Morel
11. La Tinajita
12. Canto de Hacha
13. Pensando en Ti
14. Homenaje a Santiago
- Voy Pa' Lla (1992)
1. Voy Pa' Lla
2. Confundido
3. Cocoricamo
4. La Negra
5. Me Muero Por Ti
6. Vida Mía
7. La Cieguita Mía
8. El Naranjal
9. La Caravana
10. Recordando a Dany
- Pa' Mi Campo (1993)
- Pegaito (1995)
1. Llegó Tu Marido
2. No Me Dejes Solo
3. Oeo
4. Joaquín García
5. Jovinita
6. El Pegaito
7. La Mala Maña
8. El Santo Cachón
9. El Diente de Oro
10. El Moño Parao
11. Te Busco Vida Mía
12. A la Orilla del Río
13. Tú Me Pides Que Te Olvide
14. Enamorado
- Mejor Que Nunca (1999)
1. El Paquetón
2. La Marquesina
3. El Jondia'o
4. Sentencia
5. La Picadora
6. Quítate de Ahí
7. No Te Voy a Llorar
8. Cómo Olvidar
9. Hechicera
10. Mi Merengue
11. El Picotea'o
12. El Zumbador
- Yo Quiero Alegría (2000)
1. A Comer Lechón
2. Toma Tu Yuca
3. Ojos Azules
4. Yo Quiero Alegría
5. El Paquetón
6. Los Pelos de Punta
7. Devuélveme la Vida
8. Polla Porque No Pone
9. Qué Lindo Es Eso
10. Me Muero Por Ella
11. Wilfredo González
12. Corazón Herido
- ¡Qué Vaina! (2002)
1. La Cuerdecita
2. Vivir Sin Tu Amor
3. La Escoba
4. La Maleta
5. Las Flores
6. El Orinoco
7. Está Peleao
8. Devuélveme la Vida
9. Amapola
10. Mi Amor
11. Aunque Siga Viviendo
12. El Polvo
13. La Mujer Que Yo Quiero
14. Qué Vaina
- El Paquetón (2003)

== Compilations ==
- 15 Éxitos (1985)
- 20 Grandes Éxitos (1994)
1. El Hombre Tuyo Soy Yo
2. El Tornillo
3. India de los Ojos Verdes
4. Consagración de Cariño
5. Cuando Te Enamoro a Ti
6. Divina Que Linda Eres
7. Piedras En Mi Camino
8. La Carta
9. Cuando Me Enamoro de Ti
10. Mi Suegra
11. Río Rebelde
12. El Tanque de Guerra
13. El Alicate
14. Ay Mamá
15. Francisco No Llora
16. La Cosquillita
17. Que Cosita
18. Dentro de Mi Corazón
19. Amor Bonito
20. Me Quiero Casar
