= Juan Francisco García (composer) =

Dominican merengue composer

- Born: Juan Francisco García; 16 June 1892; Santiago de los Caballeros, Dominican Republic
- Died: 18 November 1974 (aged 82); Santo Domingo, Dominican Republic
- Occupation: Composer

Juan Francisco García (born June 16, 1892 - November 18, 1974) was a Dominican merengue composer. He was one of several merengue musicians who sought to promote the genre in the early 20th century, along with Juan Espínola and Julio Alberto Hernández. Garcia was an educated musician who brought merengue to the upper-class of the country.

== Biography ==
Juan Francisco García was born on June 16, 1892, in the city of Santiago de los Caballeros. From an early age García had an excellent musical ear and a knack for performing various musical instruments. He studied music theory with Maestro José García Oviedo and was later self-taught, he learned to play the cello and piano. The study method of Fetís was Garcia's main guide in the art of composition, which he mastered and from which created an extensive and valuable catalog of works of various genres.

His works are also permeated by the Dominican folklore, which he developed to a very high degree in works like the String Quartet No.1, which he composed in 1922 and premiered in Santiago de los Caballeros in 1929; and quisqueyana Symphony, completed in 1935 and was released on March 21, 1941, by the Symphony Orchestra of Santo Domingo at the Olympia theater.

In 1925 he traveled to Cuba to make a tour as accompanist tenor Susano Polanco. On that occasion the Master Garcia met the poet Nicolás Guillén, who took the verses to compose the music of his song Mirror. The piece was premiered during that tour and a few years later, in 1930, Eduardo Brito recorded in the city of New York to make it known to the whole world.

García also composed Fantasía simastral in 1947, Fantasy concertante for piano and orchestra in 1949, and a large number of nationalist piano pieces. Among his best known works are also Mal de amor song, el Himno a la bandera, and the la criolla Margarita del Campo.

Juan Francisco García died on November 18, 1974, in Santo Domingo.

García's pupils included Margarita Luna de Espaillat.
