= Luis Alberti (musician) =

Background information
- Born: Luis Felipe Alberti Mieses; 6 April 1906; La Vega, Dominican Republic
- Died: 26 January 1976 (aged 69) Santiago de los Caballeros, Dominican Republic
- Genre: Merengue
- Occupations: Composer, arranger, conductor

Luis Alberti (6 April 1906 – 26 January 1976) was a Dominican Merengue musician, arranger, conductor, and author of significant popular songs such as Compadre Pedro Juan and many others performed and recorded by noted interpreters with diverse backgrounds.

== Life ==
Born Luis Felipe Alberti Mieses in La Vega, Dominican Republic, he is descended from a family full of musicians. His great-grandfather, Juan Bautista Alfonseca, composed the first Dominican national anthem; his mother, María Mieses, was a piano professor. At the age of seven, Alberti played the cymbals in the municipal band of his hometown before moving with his family to Santa Cruz de Mao, where he received formal violin training and started a professional career. There he met and married Gilma Tio. After that, the young musician went to Santiago de los Caballeros and attended several courses of violin perfectioning. He later accompanied silent films in theatres and played with the Orquesta Sinfónica de Santo Domingo in 1932, year of its foundation.

In 1936, Alberti led a merengue jazz band that often emphasized advanced harmonies and lyrics over the Merengue típico, known as perico ripiao, and played with the usual instruments of folk merengue (accordion, tambora and güira). Alberti gave merengue a greater urban appearance by taking the music to high society ballrooms.

Alberti composed popular songs as Luna sobre el Jaragua, Tu no podrás olvidar, Estampas criollas and Compadre Pedro Juan, which became an international hit and has been recorded by dozens of performers, including Francis Santana, Billo's Caracas Boys, Xavier Cugat, El Gran Combo de Puerto Rico, Porfi Jiménez, Dámaso Pérez Prado, Wilfrido Vargas, Angel Viloria y su Conjunto Típico Cibaeño, and Alberto Naranjo & El Trabuco Venezolano.

Alberti died in Santiago de los Caballeros at the age of 69.

== Discography ==
- Luna Sobre el Jaragua (1951)
- Luna Sobre el Jaragua Vol. 2 (1955)
- Merengues (1970)
- Fiesta Navideña en Quisqueya (1966)
- Navidades Dominicanas (with Johnny Ventura) (1977)

== Sources ==
- Gómez Sotolongo, Antonio – Los Cien Músicos del Siglo. Santo Domingo: Editora Cañabrava, c2000. 241 p. LC 00-416410.
