= Luis Alberti =

Luis Alberti may refer to:

- Luis Alberti (musician)
- Luis Alberti (actor)
