= Ñico Lora =

Dominican folk musician

Background information
- Born: Francisco Antonio Lora Cabrera; 1881; Santiago
- Died: April 9, 1971 (aged 89–90) Bisonó
- Genres: Merengue
- Occupation: Folk musician
- Instrument: Accordian

Francisco Antonio Lora Cabrera (1881 in Maizal, Santiago – 1971 in Bisonó (Navarrete)) popularly known as Ñico Lora was a folk musician from the Dominican Republic. He is considered one of the fathers of merengue.

== Early life ==
His grandfather, Félix Lunnaux, was a soldier who was part of Charles Leclerc's expedition in 1802. He was the great-uncle of Francisco Antonio Lora Ramirez.

When he was a child, he learned how to play the button accordion.

== Career ==
Though he was not educated in music theory, he reached a high level of success for his endeavors. His most influential songs were San Antonio, Tingo Talango, Eres La Mujer Más Bella, Pedrito Chávez and San Francisco. These songs remain an essential part of the musical roots of the Dominican people.

== Death and legacy ==
Ñico Lora died on April 9, 1971 in the town of Bisonó (Navarrete), where there is a plaza called "La Plaza de la Cultura Ñico Lora" which was built in 1997 to honor his achievements and contributions to Dominican music. A statue in his memory was erected in Santiago in 2007.
