= Music of Hispaniola =

Music of Hispaniola may refer to:

- Music of Haiti
- Music of the Dominican Republic
