= Juan Espínola =

Juan Espínola may refer to:

- Juan Espínola (musician) (fl. 20th century), Dominican merengue musician
- Juan Espínola (footballer, born 1953), Paraguayan football right-back
- Juan Espínola (footballer, born 1994), Paraguayan football goalkeeper
