= Giovanni Jerez =

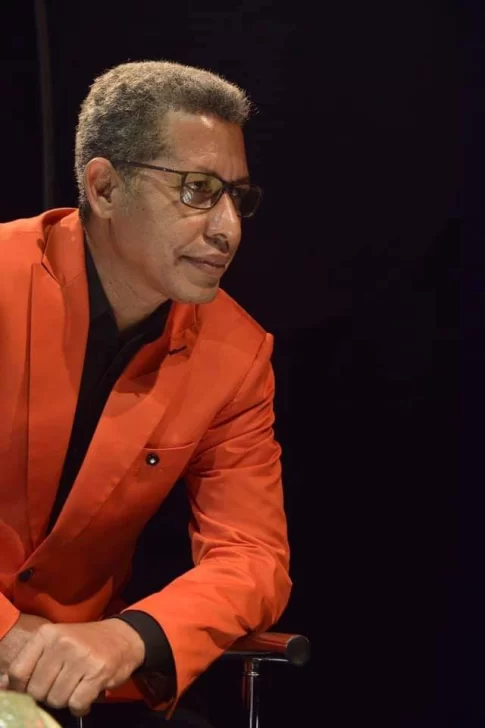
- Geovanni Jerez
- Born: Dominican Republic
- Occupations: Actor, theatre director, playwright, writer and cultural manager
- Known for: Founding president of the Dominican Union of Performing Artists (UDAA)

Giovanni Jerez (also cited in some sources as Giovanny Jerez) is a Dominican actor, theatre director, playwright, writer and cultural manager. His career has been associated with theatre, sociocultural animation, community cultural management and the promotion of artistic activities aimed at children, adolescents and local communities.

== Career ==
Jerez has developed artistic and cultural activities in different localities of the Dominican Republic. Part of his work has been related to artistic training projects, sociocultural animation and community cultural promotion, particularly in the municipality of Los Alcarrizos.

Various journalistic publications have documented his participation in cultural and community initiatives developed in that municipality.

== Theatre ==
As an actor, director and playwright, Jerez has participated in various Dominican theatrical productions.

Among the works associated with his career is Amor al rojo vivo, which has been presented in cultural venues throughout the Dominican Republic.

He has also developed the stage production Cuando el verso se hace drama, based on the dramatic interpretation of poetry and declamation.

His name has been associated with activities related to the Dominican Republic's International Theatre Festival.

== Film ==
Jerez has participated in Dominican film productions documented by specialized media outlets and film databases.

Among the projects in which he has participated is a film production inspired by the life of Dominican artist Fefita La Grande.

Some of the productions in which he has appeared have been screened through commercial cinema circuits in the region.

== Literature ==
He is the author of the children's book El Perrito Pinto al rescate, published in digital format.

== Cultural management ==
Jerez has carried out cultural management activities in both institutional and community settings.

According to institutional documentation, he served as head of the Cultural Management Department of the National Council for Children and Adolescents (CONANI).

His work has been associated with sociocultural animation programs aimed at children, adolescents and families, as well as initiatives concerning children's rights, prevention of adolescent pregnancy and prevention of early unions.

The same source indicates that he participated in the development of the institutional document Gestión Cultural Comunitaria and identifies him as the founding president of the Dominican Union of Performing Artists (UDAA).

== Public activity ==
Jerez has expressed public opinions regarding the situation of the artistic sector and cultural policies in the Dominican Republic.

He has also advocated for broader youth participation in cultural groups and activities as part of community development and social participation initiatives.
