= La India Canela =

Dominican accordionist and musician

"La India Canela" is an accordionist and musician from the Dominican Republic. She plays music from the merengue típico tradition. Born Lidia Maria Hernandez Lopez, she was born in El Limon, Villa González, in the Santiago Province. She is the first professional musician in her family, though her father and brother played recreationally. Both terms in her stage name refer to her skin color: India is the preferred term for mulatto in the Dominican Republic and canela carries the additional connotation of sweetness and spiciness.

Recognizing her talent, her father took her to stay with Miro Francisco, a famous saxophonist who also played accordion. One day, Juan de Dios, Fefita la Grande's saxophonists decided to bring her to Santiago and make a musical group. In Santiago, La India learned from Siano Arias, Rafaelito Polanco, Lupe Valerio, and Rafaelito Román, and went on to record several albums and win two Casandra Awards. In 2008, she recorded an album "Merengue Típico from the Dominican Republic" on Smithsonian Folkways Recordings and was featured on NPR's All Things Considered. She has begun to tour in the U.S. including Washington DC and New York City.

== Discography ==
- Que Siga la Fiesta! (1989)
- En Vivo (1998)
- Merengue Típico From The Dominican Republic (2008)
1. Apriétame Así
2. Consagración de Cariño
3. El Rancho
4. Recuerdo de Ada
5. El Papujito
6. La Cuestión
7. Con el Gusto Adentro
8. Las Siete Pasadas
9. Mangulina Medley
10. Chicha
11. La Culebra
12. Cuando Yo Me Muera
13. Caña Brava
