= Angel Viloria y su Conjunto Típico Cibaeño =

Angel Viloria y su Conjunto Típico Cibaeño was a merengue band performing in the US Latin community in the 1950s. It was the first band to enjoy major success in popularizing merengue music outside the Dominican Republic. The band featured Angel Viloria on the accordion (the accordion player was the traditional leader), Ramón E. García on alto saxophone, Luis Quintero on tambora and Dioris Valladares on vocals. Between 1950 and 1952, it notched up a number of hits under the New York based Ansonia Records banner of Rafael Pérez.

In its name, the band claimed to be authentic (tipico) El Cibao music - this is the region in north Dominican Republic, where merengue had its origins. The tipico merengue features a slightly faster tempo, and keeps the accordion sound, as opposed to the jazz-influenced music of Luis Alberti who had adapted merengue to a more urban ethos in the 1940s. The style of Angel Viloria's band however reflected more of the urban Alberti influence than the name admits; the accordion was of course, quite tipico.

By 1953, the band had split up, with Viloria, Quintero, and Valladares forming separate groups.

This band was a great inspiration to the creation of Konpa music in Haiti.

== Discography ==
- Merengues Vol. 2 (1958)
- Últimas Grabaciones (1969)

== Compilations ==
- Éxitos (1995)
