= Grupo Aguakate =

Dominican merengue group (2003–2006)

Grupo Aguakate was a Dominican merengue group from 2003 to 2006. The singer, known as Gerpis "Shino" Correa, is sometimes also called by the group name, Aguakate. Shino is also a radio personality on La Mega radio station in New York, being heard by millions each morning on the show "El Vacilon de la Mañana", and he is also known for his humorous lyrics that use double entendre.

== Style ==
Now named Shino Aguakate, the group's music is very fast and energetic, featuring rapid instrumental solos, but has been controversial in the tipico world because of its mixture of rhythms (for instance, in the song "Reggaeton Rippiao", the rhythm switches from merengue derecho to a reggaeton rhythm adapted for the tambora) and Shino's occasional use of strong language. The group combined innovative arrangements, traditional merengue songs, and reggaeton, and were thus able to bring merengue tipico to new audiences and new venues. Having traveled from New York to Alaska, Jamaica, Honduras, Dominican Republic, Puerto Rico, Canada and a vast part of the United States Shino Aguakate has earned the place as one of the most innovative Urban Merengue groups in the nation.

== Hits and Collaborations ==
Some of their hits include "Reggaeton Ripiao", "La Gallinita", and "Todo El Mundo Mea" from the album "De Otra Galaxia". Shino has collaborated with Krisspy, Ingco Crew, Big Family, Don Miguelo, Sergio Vargas and Watatah (Shino, Sergio Vargas and Watatah are all from Villa Altagracia) and has also appeared on the compilation 2007 Años de Exitos Reggaeton with the song "Quiero Verte (I wanna see you)" (feat. Don Miguelo) and produced by DJ Chucky. Aguakate also featured talented tipico musicians like Anthony Diaz (son of the legendary saxophone Felix Diaz) on saxophone, Pedro Lantigua on Congas, Victor De la Cruz (Beko) on Keyboards, and Belarminio Liriano on accordion. Grupo Aguakate broke up in 2006 when Shino decided to pursue a solo project. His New Project is called Shino Aguakate and is set to take the world by storm with their new Urban Merengue mix.

== Discography ==
- De Otra Galaxia (2004)
- Crazyssimo (2006)
- Out of Control (2007)
- Inkreible (2010)
