= Porfi Jiménez =

Dominican-born Venezuelan musician

Porfirio Antonio Jiménez Núñez (February 16, 1928 – June 8, 2010) was a Dominican composer, arranger, and bandleader. A native of Hato Mayor Province, he played professionally under the name Porfi Jiménez.

== Background ==
Jiménez' father died when he was three years old, and his mother gave him a trumpet when he turned eight. He began playing the instrument at school in 1940, turning himself into a professional musician two years later.

Jiménez was 26 years old when he arrived in Caracas, the capital city of Venezuela. He started to play with orchestras led by Rafael Minaya, Pedro José Belisario and Chucho Sanoja, as well as for the Billo's Caracas Boys. In the early 1960s, he became noted for his arrangements for bolero singers Felipe Pirela and Blanca Rosa Gil. He started his own Latin music dance band in 1963. With lead vocalists Kiko Mendive and Chico Salas, Jimenez' orchestra made its recording debut on the "Velvet" label. He made several albums for them in the late 1960s and mid 1970s, and helped popularize the salsa rage.

== Career ==
Jiménez and his ensemble recorded their version of "Pata Pata" which made it info the Record World Miami Hit Single Parade in April 1968.

Jiménez enjoyed a huge success in the mid 1980s while recording for "Sonografica" label, with albums combining salsa, cumbia, and his native Dominican merengue. Some of his most popular songs include La negra Celina, Se hunde el barco, Dolores and Culu Cucú, which reached number one on the Colombian, Dominican and Venezuelan Hit Parade charts. Beside this, he conducted a 17-piece Jazz orchestra to promote the big band tradition by featuring his own repertoire and selected works of Thad Jones, Chico O'Farrill, among others.

== Later years ==
In January 2007 Jiménez was honored in New York City by the United Nations Orchestra, created by Dizzy Gillespie, for his long and storied career in Latin music.

== Death ==
Jiménez died in Caracas at the age of 82 on June 8, 2010.

== Discography ==
Esto es ritmo 1964 • Porfi y Su Conjunto Ritmico

Únicamente tú 1964 • Felipe Pirela & Porfi Jiménez y Su Orquesta

A bailar con Porfi 1966

Ron con coco 1966

Pata-pata con ¡Porfi! 1967

Y el negro ahi! 1967

Orquesta Porfi Jiménez: Canta Felipe Pirela 1967 • Felipe Pirela & Porfi Jiménez y Su Orquesta

Casatshok Latin Soul 1968

Por fin Porfi 1968

Rate La machaca 1972

Así soy yo 1973

El rico sabor de Porfi Jiménez y Su Orquesta 1974

Cortando cabezas 1977

20 Años 1985

Porfi '85 1985

Bula bula 1988

Ululukukulala 1989

Parrandeando con la trigueña hermosa! 1990 • Porfi Jimenez y Su Orquesta Parrandeando

Como siempre 1992

Porfi Jiménez – Saludos a Puerto Rico 1997

== Sources ==
* In Spanish
