= Makleen =

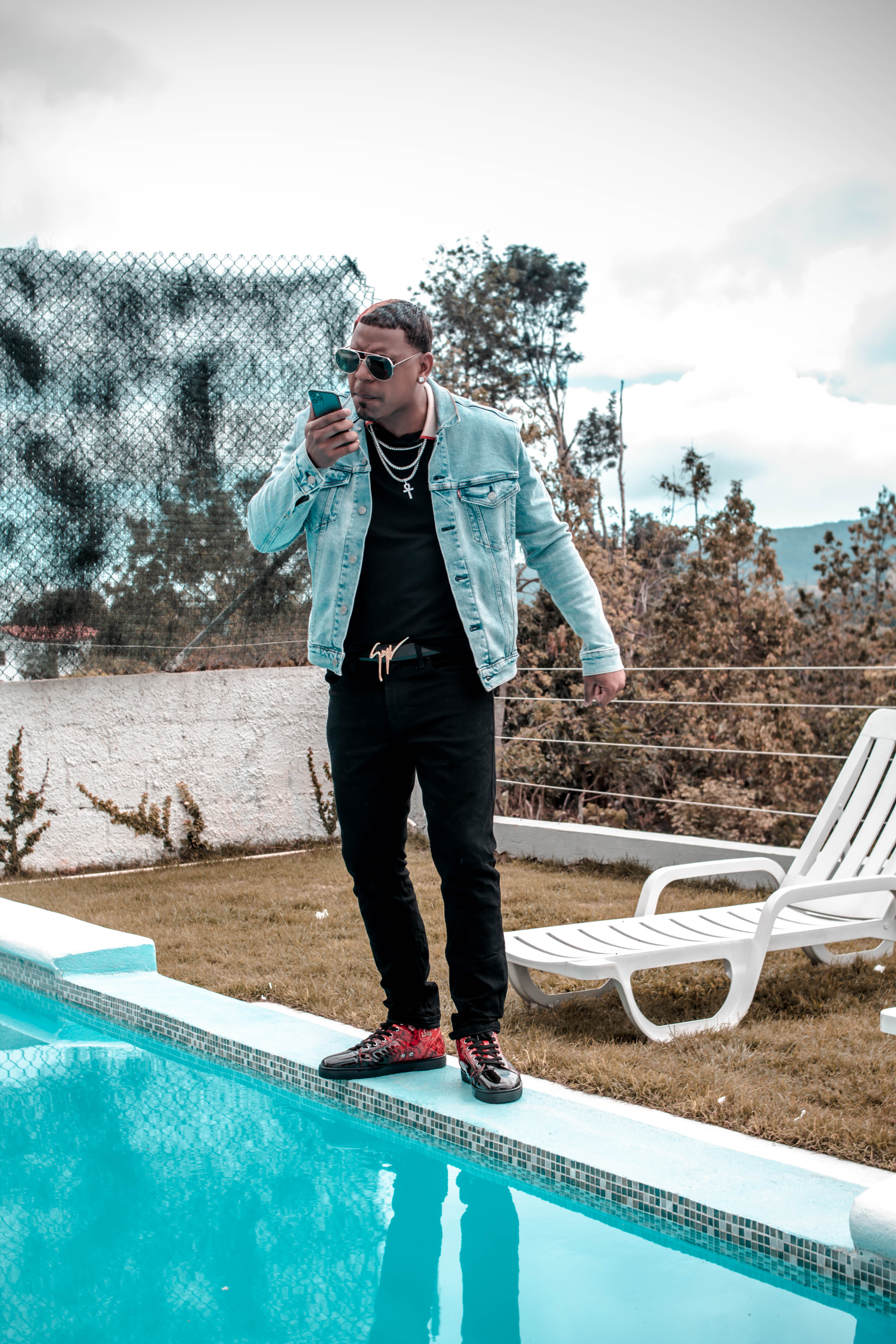
- Makleen in 2021, New York

Background information
- Also known as: Makleen
- Born: Erick Hollypher Quezada Suárez; April 9, 1991 (age 35)
- Origin: República Dominicana
- Genres: Reggaeton; Hip hop
- Occupations: Singer; rapper
- Years active: 2007–present
- Labels: Flow Magic Company (2007–2014); Independent (present)

Makleen is a Dominican singer and rapper based in New York City. Since his debut in 2014, he has released two EPs and several singles, collaborating with artists such as Tivi Gunz, Nico Clínico, and Nipo 809. Meanwhile, as a music producer and composer, Makleen has also collaborated on albums and songs for other artists and producers, having his songs as protagonists themes of love, heartbreak and stories of the street.

== Musical career ==
Makleen is a Dominican singer and producer. He was born on April 9, 1991, in the city of Jarabacoa, Dominican Republic. After finishing his studies in Jarabacoa, Erick attended music school to pursue an artistic career. He started his career in a group called Flow Magic Company in 2007. His teacher's name was BS El Ideologo. His talent for singing was discovered when dance instructor began to hum a song and finished it, able to play the high notes.

He formally debuted in 2014 performing Latin trap, Reggaeton, R&B, genre with which he managed to establish himself as one of the new Dominican artists of urban music. The subject of his music of him frequently features themes of culture and social issues of the Caribbean. He has sung at major events in New York such as the Dominican Day Parade and Puerto Rican Day Parade.

Makleen was recognized by music distribution company TuneCore in 2020, reaching 10k Streaming certified and the Music Streaming Awards, awarded him a 100k Streaming certification for his EP Timeless.

At present, Makleen is promoting several singles that include "Apaga la luz" and "No toy en ti", songs on which he has collaborated as a composer and as a music producer. Likewise, he has announced his EP Yesterday where he releases songs from his early career. Makleen is currently in the United States working on new projects, including a trap and drill album.

== Personal life ==
Erick's mother name was Rosaura Suarez and father name was Carlos Ortega, they were government secretary. They died when Erick was only of 10.

== Discography ==
=== EPs ===
- 2020: Timeless
- 2021: Yesterday

=== Singles ===
- 2021: "Prepago" (featuring Saik)
