= Pambiche =

Dominican music genre and type of dance

- Stylistic origins: Merengue típico
- Cultural origins: American occupation of the Dominican Republic (1916–1924)
- Typical instruments: Accordion, tambora, güira

Pambiche is a Dominican music genre and dance form derived from merengue típico, the traditional style of merengue. It has a slower tempo than standard merengue and its tambora rhythm is based on the cinquillo.

This style of merengue was originally known as merengue estilo yanqui (yankee-style merengue) or "Palm Beach one step", from which the term pambiche stems (corruption of "Palm Beach"). It is said to have originated from the americanized versions of merengue that the US military personnel performed during the occupation of the Dominican Republic. It is considered one of the most difficult americanized Latin American dances.

== Recordings ==
Dominican accordionist El Prodigio released an album entitled Pambiche Meets Jazz in which he combined traditional merengue rhythms (most of the songs featuring pambiche) with American music styles such as jazz, rock and blues.

Both pambiche and merengue are included in Jean Françaix's suite "Cinq Danses Exotiques".

The Dominican songwriter Juan Luis Guerra has recorded several Pambiches, including the traditional merengue Juana Mecho (Soplando, 1984) and his recent releases Pambiche de novia (Privé, 2020). Other pambiches are the traditional Juan Gomero, Rafael Solano's Dominicanita, Vicente Garcia's Palm Beach, and Luys Bien's Déjame Nacer.
