= Geovanny Polanco =

Dominican merengue singer (born 1974)

Geovanny Polanco (born 2 November 1974; also spelled Yovanny, Jhovanny, Yhovanny, or Jovanny) is a merengue típico singer from Nagua, María Trinidad Sánchez Province, Dominican Republic.
