= Trio Reynoso =

- Origin: Dominican Republic
- Genres: Merengue tipico, Bachata

Trio Reynoso also known as "The Kings of Merengue Tipico" are considered to be one of the best musical groups of perico ripiao or merengue tipico. Trio Reynoso was composed of singer/accordionist Pedro Reynoso, percussionist Francisco Esquea, singer and güira player Domingo Reynoso, and marimbero and güirero Antonio Rosario Almonte(chirichito) who is known as one of the best güireros of all time and they laid the foundations of a new local mainstream called bachata-merengue. They were considered the most popular Latin group during the Trujillo and Post-Trujillo era. They became a well-known group in parts of Latin America other than the Dominican Republic such as Cuba and Puerto Rico. After the death of Pedro Reynoso on July 18, 1965, Trio Reynoso had to get a new accordionist and lead singer. In the end, it came out to be Tatico Henriquez, who in 1966, recorded his first song with the group called "Lo Que Tu Me Pidas". Some well notable songs that they have recorded were "Juana Mecho", "El Gallo Floreao", "Canto De Hacha", "Juanita Morel", "Alevántate", "Chanflin", "Mi Mujer De Oro", "Maria Luisa", "El Picoteao" and "La Lisa". Tatico Henriquez would go into the footsteps of Pedro Reynoso and become one of the greatest accordionists of the Merengue Típico genre. He is also the most popular artist of the merengue típico genre that has sold more records than any other artist in the history of Merengue Típico.

In July 2013, the Association of Art Reporters included the "Trío Reynoso con Tatico" album among their collection "100 Essential Albums of Dominican music".

In the Juana Mecho LP, it was a compilation of tipicos that originally was never complete due to the death of Pedro Reynoso. In the end, Side A consisted of six songs by Pedro Reynoso and Side B consisted of Tatico's first six recordings as an accordionist and lead singer in the trio. For a short amount of time, Joseito Mateo, who is considered to be "The King of Merengue", played the tambora, especially in the Juana Mecho LP of Tatico's first recordings with the group.

== Discography ==
=== Merengues Trio Reynoso ===
- Mi Mujer de Oro
- Adela
- Desiderio Arias
- Las Tres Muchachas
- La Maya Prendia
- El Guaba
- Guizando
- Canto de Hacha
- Mi Desengaño
- Te Cayo Gas
- El Tira y Jala
- La Niña Que No Da Amor

=== 15 Exitos de Siempre Con El Original ===
- Juanita Morel
- Fiesta
- Ay Caramba
- El Cafe de Comay Juana
- Dolorita
- Dolores la Buenamosa
- Alevantate
- Compadre Pedro Juan
- Conformidad
- La Subidora
- Ta Buen Piquero
- Tin Tin Feliciana
- La Serrania
- La Enrama
- La Ligadura

=== Trio Reynoso Merengues ===
- La Nena
- El Chemisse
- El Papujito
- La Espinita
- Virgen de la Altagracia
- La Lisa
- Baila Conmigo
- La Mujer Santa
- La Mano de Dios
- Matame con tu Cuchilla

=== Trio Reynoso Cibao Adentro ===
- De Que Es Priva Dolores
- Las Flores
- El Sinverguenzon
- Los Algodones
- El Serrucho
- Cibao Adentro
- El Comisario
- Compay Cucu
- Hasta El Rio
- Juanita Morel
- Los Mangos
- Cualquiera Va

=== A Bailar Merengue con el Trio Reynoso ===
- Lucero de la Mañana
- Teresita
- El Colita Blanca
- El Mosquito
- El Guava
- El Merequeten
- Aguardiente Ven
- Conformidad
- Oye mi Merengue
- Encalacate Conmigo
- Le Cojen la Seña
- La Justicia

=== El Chucu Chucu ===
- El Chucu Chucu
- Emilio mi Colega
- Mingo Gonzalez
- El Gallo Floreao
- La Gina
- Rompe Cabezas
- El Picoteao
- Maria Dolores
- La Ultima Moda
- Mis Tres Amores
- Con el Alma
- La Vieja Bruja

=== El Ultimo De Los Reynoso Merengues ===
- La Muerte De Martin
- Ay! La Vida
- Rosa Se Llamaba
- La Carabana
- A La Buena De Dios
- La 7 Pasadas(Solo Accordion)
- La Mamajuana
- La Mujer Mas Bella
- Recuerdo A Ramona
- No Me Llames Por Tu Nombre

=== Perico Ripiao Con el Original Trio Reynoso Vol. 3 (1958) ===
- El Hombre Marinero
- Tolinlanla
- La Subidora
- Monto Mi Caballo
- Ahora Si Hay Melao
- Conformidad
- Tin Tin Tin "Feliciana"
- La Serranía
- Ay Mi Dios
- Llorar de Amores

=== Merengue Tradicionales/Juana Mecho ===
- Juana Mecho
- Heroina
- Picoteao
- No Me Importa
- San Antonio
- Pintalabio
- Se Seca La Rama
- Lo Que a Mi Me Pasa
- Adeyda
- Lo Que Tu Pidas
- El Mismo Dolor
- El Bate Domingo

=== El Original Trio Reynoso En Su Epoca De Oro ===
- Con el Alma
- Puro Cibaeño
- Emilio mi Colega
- Maria Dolores
- Saludos a Miguel
- Chanflin
- Mis Tres Mujeres
- Le voy a dar una pela
- Soñe Contigo
- Juan Gomero
- Las Mercedes
- Tirale Bajito

=== Autentico Merengues Dominicanos Vol.3 ===
- De Que Es Que Priva Dolores
- Las Flores
- El Sinverguenzon
- Los Algodones
- El Serrucho
- Cibao Adentro
- El Comisario
- Compay Cucu
- Hasta El Rio
- Juanita Morel
- Los Mangos
- Por Una Boricua

=== Conjunto Reynoso en 14 Selecciones Merengue Dominicano LP ===
- Cuidado No Hay Bocina
- La Gualetica
- Llorar de amores
- Maria Luisa
- El Pichoncito
- El Gallo Floreao
- La Vieja Bruja
- El Cola Blanca
- Emilio Mi Colega
- El Biberón
- Teresita
- Lucero De La Mañana
- La Gina
- Año Nuevo
