= Tatico Henríquez =

Dominican musician (1943-1976)

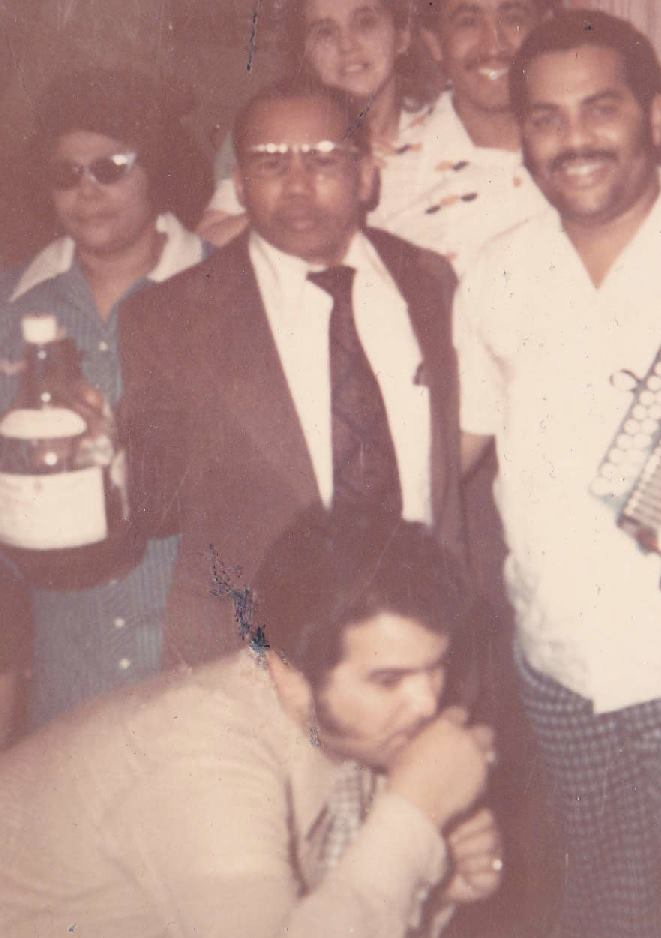
- Henríquez, on the right (1976)

Background information
- Also known as: Tatico
- Born: Domingo García Henríquez; July 30, 1943; Nagua, Dominican Republic
- Died: May 23, 1976 (aged 32) Santiago de los Caballeros, Dominican Republic
- Genre: Merengue típico
- Occupation: Musician
- Instrument: Accordion
- Formerly of: Trio Reynoso

Domingo "Tatico" García Henríquez (July 30, 1943 – May 23, 1976), considered one of the best accordionists of Merengue típico, was born in Nagua, Dominican Republic. His career began in the 1960s and the early 1970s. He was known for his skill on the accordion and the addition of new instruments to a standard merengue tipico band.

== Personal life ==
His father's name was Bolo Henriquez. He has a son named Fary Henriquez who also plays accordion. He is the father of Erwin Mendez, who resides in the Dominican Republic.

== Death ==
Tatico died in a car accident in Santiago, Dominican Republic, in the well-known barrio of Los Ciruelitos on May 23, 1976. The accident occurred while he was trying to cross a busy intersection while driving under the influence of alcohol.

== Musical career ==
Tatico Henriquez began his career in 1966 by appearing on a very popular radio station in the Dominican Republic called Radio Quisqueyana with the help of disc jockey and radio host, Rafael Cardenas. At the time, Mr. Cardenas hosted a show called Musica Tipica Dominicana, which ran Monday to Friday from 5:00pm to 6:00pm. Mr. Cardenas provided Henriquez with his first opportunity in the music industry and further assisted him in his career by accompanying him and hosting various of his concerts prior to his untimely death.

=== Innovative band composition ===
Henriquez was an innovator in the standard lineup of merengue tipico. In the past, the lineup was a two-row diatonic accordion, güira, tambora, marímbola (a bass-like instrument), and occasionally, saxophone.

Tatico's band lineup included a two-row diatonic accordion, güira, tambora, two saxophones to harmonize with the accordion, conga (usually playing rhythms around the tambora), and electric bass, in place of the marimba.

=== Tatico musicians ===
- Guira – His brother Julio Henriquez; Domingo Reynoso; Milciades Hernandez
- Tambora – Viejo Ca; El Flaco; Manon; El Flechú, Domingo Peña, Sibita, Pancholo (trio Reynoso).
- Saxophone – Felix Díaz; Miro Francisco; Danny Cabrera
- Electric Bass – Manochi; Nolo
- Conga – Roberto "La Culebra"
- Marimba- Domingo Peña.

=== Tatico Henriquez and Isaias "Saco" Henriquez ===
Tatico and his brother Isaias both recorded a CD. Tatico only sang while his brother Isaias played the accordion. Their musicians for this disc were Julio Henriquez (guirero), Isaias "Saco" Henriquez (accordionist), Tatico Henriquez (singer), Danny Cabrera (saxophonist) and Manochi (marimbero).

== Discography ==
- Merengues..! (1970)
- Merengues..! Vol. 2 (1971)
- Merengues..! Vol. 3 (1972)
- A Gozar Con Tatico (1974)
- Tatico Interpreta Sus Últimas Grabaciones (1978)
- Los Hermanos Henríquez (1980)
- Sus Últimos Merengues (1981)
- Merengues (1981)
- 20 Éxitos (1989)
- Merengues..!: 15 Éxitos Vol. 2 (1991)
- 20 Grandes Éxitos (1994)
- Homenaje a Tatico Henríquez (1994)
- El Disco de Oro (1996)
- Soy Cibaeño (1998)
- Ídolo del Pueblo (2007)

== Sources ==
- iASO Records - Tatico Henriquez Biography
- Origenes y Trayectoria del Merengue de Enramada
