= Julio Alberto Hernández =

Dominican composer

Julio Alberto Hernández (September 27, 1900 – April 2, 1999) was a Dominican composer. He specialized in folk-music based compositions.

== Biography ==
He was born in Santiago de los Caballeros and is the nephew of P.T. Camejo. In addition to studying solfeggio with his uncle, he also studied saxophone, piano, and the organ, eventually becoming a teacher and founding the Jose O. Garcia Vila School of Music.

Moving to Santo Domingo, he was a founding member of the Sociedad de Conciertos and the Orquesta Sinfonica; he directed the latter until 1937.

His works are based on Dominican folk music, usually merengue. The works which have met with the widest acclaim are vocal/piano or orchestral pieces.

His composition Caminito de Tu Casa was recorded by the Viva America Orchestra conducted by Alfredo Antonini with John Serry Sr. in 1946 for Alpha Records (# 12205A, 12205B, 12206A, 12206B).
