= Krisspy =

Dominican merengue tipico musician

- Also known as: Krisspi
- Born: Juan de los Santos
- Origin: Loma de Cabrera, Las Jagua, Dominican Republic
- Genres: Merengue, Tropical
- Occupation: Singer

Krisspy, real name Juan de los Santos, is a Dominican merengue típico musician.

== Discography ==
- El Bombazo Típico (2004)
- Tipico Live (2004)
- Yo Soy el Flow (2006)
- El guto ta aqui (2012)
- Homenajes Tipico (2013)
- Palos Tipicos (2016)
