= Juan Espínola (musician) =

Dominican merengue musician

Juan Espínola was a Dominican merengue musician in the early 20th century. He is best known for his attempts to bring merengue music to mainstream audiences through ballrooms and other public venues. These attempts failed during his career due to the risque nature of the merengue lyrics.
