= El Prodigio =

Dominican merengue típico accordionist

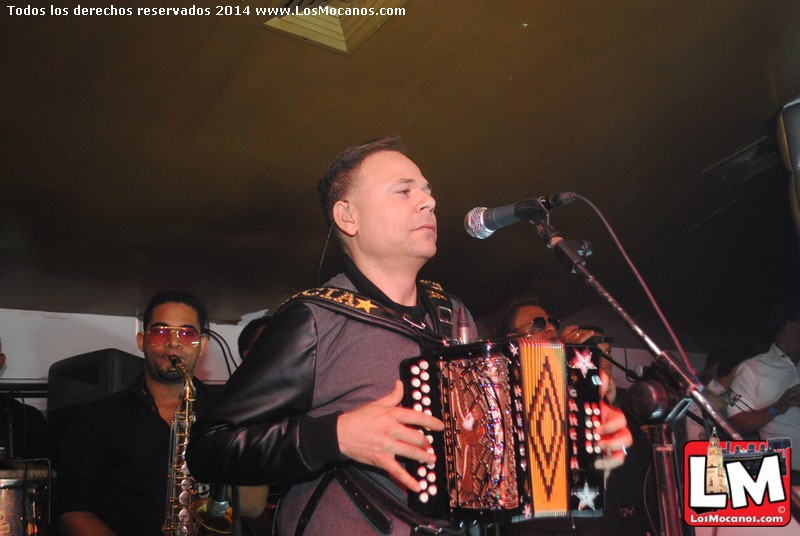
El Prodigio playing accordion

Krency Garcia, better known as El Prodigio, is a famous merengue típico accordionist from Cabrera, Dominican Republic. He is known throughout the genre for his rapid instrumental solos, his origination of fusion in merengue tipico with genres like jazz, and his rivalry with fellow accordionists, Geovanny Polanco and Kerube Ortiz (Leader of the tipico band Kerubanda). While the latter two are slightly more traditional in terms of musical style, El Prodigio is more experimental, and has included instruments such as trombone, trumpet, and wurlitzer piano in his lineup, along with the standard accordion, tambora, güira, conga, electric bass, and saxophones of today's merengue tipico.

== Biography ==
Krency began playing the accordion at a young age, and gave his first public performance at the age of 5. He proceeded to play on various children's TV shows that aired in the Dominican Republic. He later studied jazz at Berklee Institute of Music in the United States, and later used elements of jazz in his improvisation techniques and albums. In addition to fusion, he is also known for his interpretation of traditional merengue típico and salsa standards, such as "Juanita Morel", "El Estrujao", "Cualquiera Llora (Tatico Llorando)" and "La Vida es un Carnaval." His American music interpretations include "Mountain Dance" (originally performed by Dave Grusin) and "Twist and Shout" by The Beatles.

Krency performed "Bodega Baddie" with Cardi B on Saturday Night Live in 2026. It samples El Prodigio's Tá Buena.

== Discography ==
- El Hombre Acordeón En Vivo (2007)
- Pambiche Meets Jazz (2005)
- From Santo Domingo Live! (Vivo) (2005)
- Cabecita Loca (2004)
- En Vivo (2003)
- Que Se Vaya (2001)
- Se Alocó (1998)
- Krency Garcia, El Prodigio y la banda tipica, Interplanetario
- Krency Garcia, El Prodigio y la banda tipica, en vivo
