= Merengue music =

Music genre of Dominican Republic

Merengue
- Cultural origins: Mid-19th century, Cibao, Dominican Republic

Subgenres
- Merengue típico; merengue estilo yanqui; merengue con mambo; merengue redondo; pambiche; pri-prí; merengue con reggaeton

Fusion genres
- Merenrap; merenhouse; merengueton

Regional scenes
- Dominican Republic; Cuba; Puerto Rico; Colombia; Mexico; Honduras; Guatemala; Ecuador; United States; El Salvador; Venezuela

Other topics
- Bachata; merengue típico; méringue

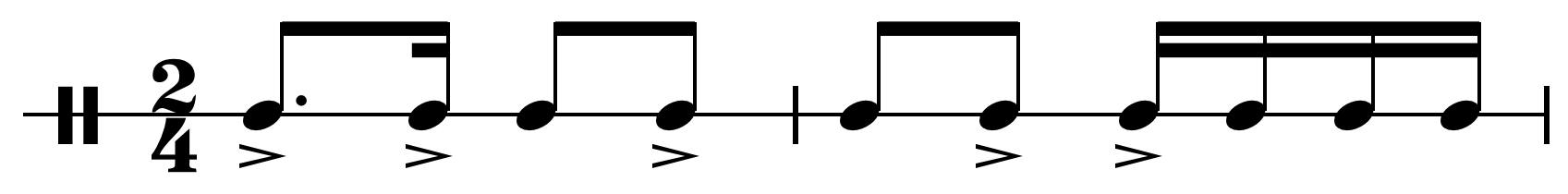
Merengue rhythm

Dominican Merengue is a type of music and dance originating in the present-day Dominican Republic which has become a very popular genre throughout Latin America, as well as in several major cities in the United States with Latino communities. Merengue was inscribed on November 30, 2016, in the representative list of the Intangible Cultural Heritage of Humanity of UNESCO.

Dominican Merengue was developed in the middle of the 19th century, originally played with European stringed instruments (bandurria and guitar). Years later, the stringed instruments were replaced by the accordion, thus conforming, together with the güira and the tambora, the instrumental structure of the typical merengue ensemble. This set, with its three instruments, represents the synthesis of the three cultures that made up the idiosyncrasy of Dominican culture: the European influence is represented by the accordion, the African by the tambora (a two-head drum), and the Taíno by the güira.

The genre was later promoted by Rafael Trujillo, the dictator from 1930 to 1961, who turned it into the national music and dance style of the Dominican Republic. In the United States it was first popularized by New York–based groups and bandleaders like Rafael Petiton Guzman, beginning in the 1930s, and Angel Viloria y su Conjunto Típico Cibaeño in the 1950s. It was during the Trujillo era that the merengue "Compadre Pedro Juan", by Luis Alberti, became an international hit and standardized the 2-part form of the merengue.

Famous merengue artists and groups include Juan Luis Guerra, Wilfrido Vargas, Milly Quezada, Toño Rosario, Rubby Pérez, Fernando Villalona, Los Hermanos Rosario, Bonny Cepeda, Johnny Ventura, Eddy Herrera, Sergio Vargas, La Mákina, Miriam Cruz, Las Chicas Del Can, Kinito Mendez, Jossie Esteban y la Patrulla 15, Pochy y su Cocoband, Cuco Valoy, Ramón Orlando, Alex Bueno, The New York Band, Elvis Crespo, Olga Tañón, Gisselle, Conjunto Quisqueya and Grupomanía.

The popularity of merengue has been increasing in Venezuela. Venezuelan Merengueros include Roberto Antonio, Miguel Moly, Natusha, Porfi Jiménez, Billo's Caracas Boys, and Los Melodicos. Merengue is also popular in the coastal city of Guayaquil in Ecuador.

The new line of merengue created in New York City has become very popular amongst younger listeners. Known as "Merengue de Mambo", its proponents include Omega, El Sujeto Oro 24, Los Ficos, Los Gambinos, Alberto Flash, Mala Fe, Henry Jimenez, and Aybar.

Although the etymology of merengue can be disputed, there are a few theories about where the word might have derived from. One suggestion is that the term derives from meringue, a dish made from egg whites that is popular in Latin-American countries. The sound made by the whipping of eggs supposedly resembles the güira used in merengue.

== History ==
The origins of the music are traced to the Cibao Valley, where merengue cibaeño and merengue típico are the terms most musicians use to refer to "classical "merengue. The word Cibao was a native Taíno name for the island, although the Spanish used it in their conquest to refer to the current-day valley of the same name.

Merengue was first mentioned in the mid-19th century with the earliest documented evidence being newspaper articles. Some of the articles inform about a "lascivious" dance, and also highlight merengue displacing the Tumba. The genre had originated within the rural, northern valley region around the city of Santiago called the Cibao. It later spread throughout the country and became popular among the urban population.

The oldest form of merengue was typically played on string instruments. When the accordion came to the island in the 1880s, introduced by German traders, it quickly became the primary instrument, and to this day is still the instrument of choice in merengue típico. Later, the piano and brass instruments were introduced to the genre.

== Musical style ==
Three main types of merengue are played in the Dominican Republic today. Merengue típico, which is usually called perico ripiao, is the oldest style commonly played. The other two types are merengue de orquesta (big-band merengue) and merengue de guitarra (guitar merengue).

=== Rhythm ===
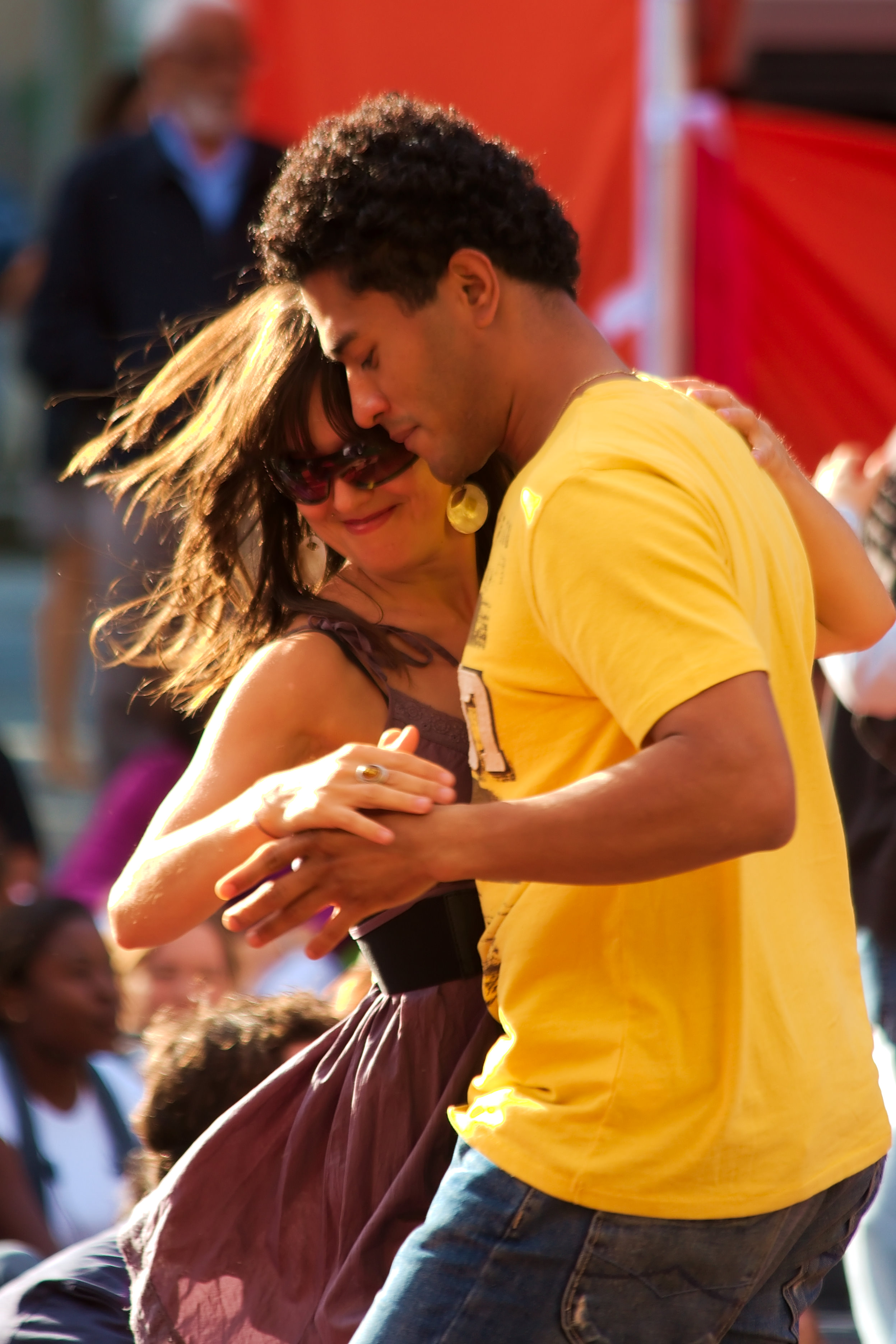
Merengue dance

Merengues are fast arrangements with a 2/4 beat. The traditional instrumentation for a conjunto típico (traditional band), the usual performing group of folk merengue, is a diatonic accordion, a two–sided drum, called a tambora, held on the lap, and a güira. A güira is a percussion instrument that sounds like a maraca. It is a sheet of metal with small bumps on it (created with hammer and nail), shaped into a cylinder, and played with a stiff brush. The güira is brushed steadily on the downbeat with an "and-a" thrown in at certain points, or played in more complex patterns that generally mark the time. Caballito rhythm, or a quarter and two eighths, is also common. The double-headed drum is played on one side with a stick syncopation and on the other side with the palm of the hand.

The traditional (some say fundamental) signature rhythm figure of merengue is the quintillo, which is essentially a syncopated motif whose pattern is broken by five successive drumhead hits at the transition between every second and third beat, alternating between the hand and the stick. To purists, a merengue without quintillo is not truly a merengue, a viewpoint that has gradually disappeared as other alternate figures are used more frequently (as the one traditionally called jaleo, also known as merengue bomba, wrongly identified as a mixture of merengue and Puerto Rican bomba music, and which actually also has its roots in traditional merengue).

Three main types of merengue are played in the Dominican Republic today. Merengue típico, which is usually called perico ripiao, is the oldest style commonly played. In English perico ripiao means "ripped parrot", which suggests controversy but which is said to be the name of a brothel where the music was originally played. The other two types are merengue de orquesta (big-band merengue) and merengue de guitarra (guitar merengue).

=== Stylistic changes ===
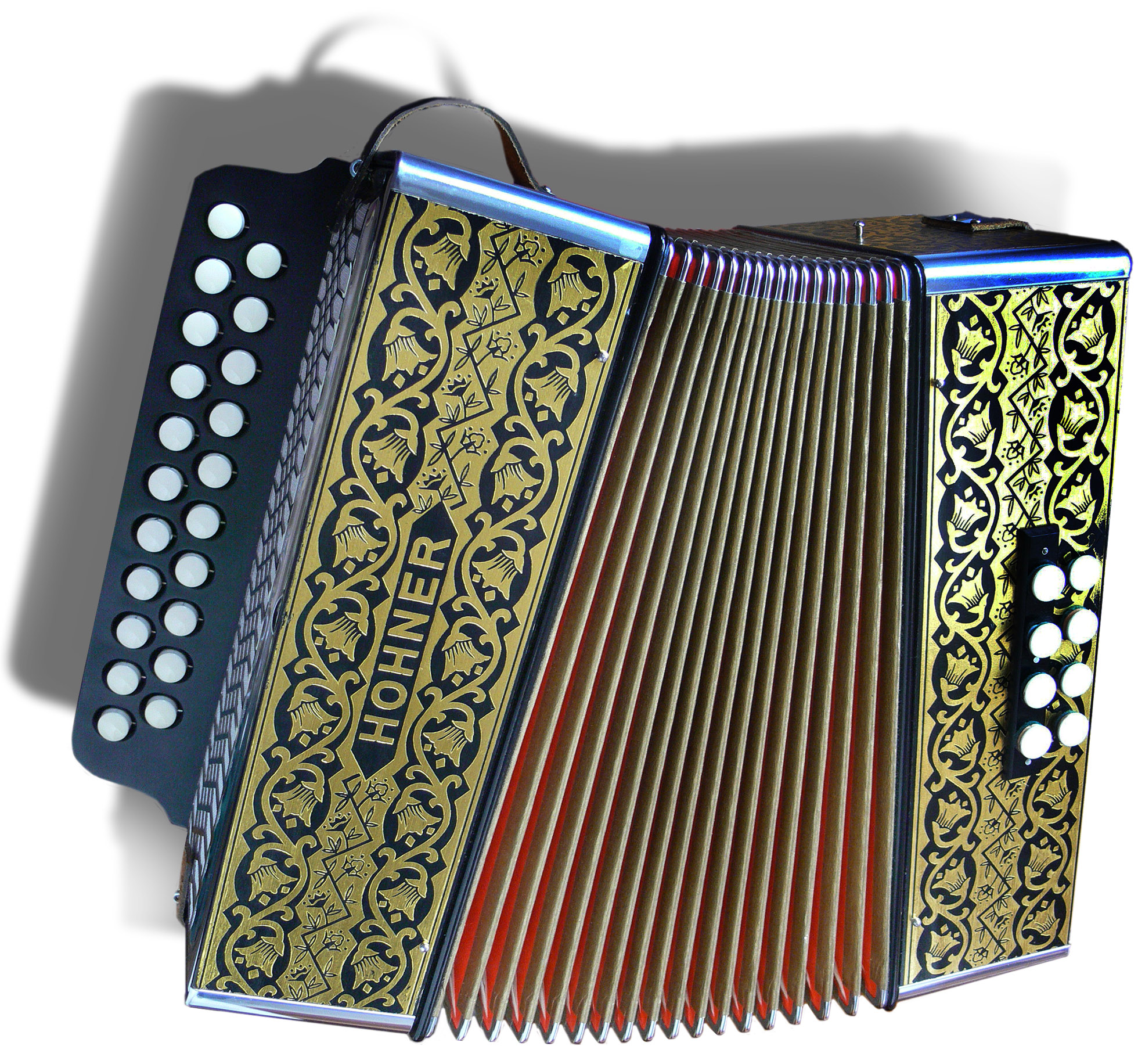
Diatonic accordion

At first, merengue típico was played on stringed instruments like the tres and cuatro, but when Germans came to the island in the late 19th century trading their instruments for tobacco, the accordion quickly replaced the strings as lead instrument. Típico groups play a variety of rhythms, but most common are the merengue and the pambiche. In the 1930s–1950s, a bass instrument was also often used. Called marimba, it resembles the Cuban marímbula, and is a large box-shaped thumb piano with 3-6 metal keys. The main percussion instruments, güira and tambora, have been a part of the ensemble since the music's inception, and are so important that they are often considered symbolic of the whole country. The güira is a metal scraper believed to be of native Taíno origin, while the tambora is a two-headed drum of African origin. Together with the European accordion, the típico group symbolizes the three cultures that combined to make today's Dominican Republic.

One important figure in early merengue was Francisco "Ñico" Lora (1880–1971), who is often credited for quickly popularizing the accordion at the turn of the 20th century. Lora was once asked how many merengues he had composed in his lifetime and he answered "thousands", probably without much exaggeration, and many of these compositions are still a standard part of the típico repertoire. He was a skilled improviser who could compose songs on the spot, by request. But he has also been likened to a journalist, since in his precomposed songs "he commented on everything with his accordion" (Pichardo, in Austerlitz 1997:35). His compositions discussed current events such as Cuban independence, World War I, the arrival of the airplane, and US occupation of the Dominican Republic. Among Lora's contemporaries are Toño Abreu and Hipólito Martínez, best remembered for their merengue "Caña Brava". This popular song was composed in 1928 or 1929 as an advertisement for the Brugal rum company, who were then selling a rum of the same name. Brugal paid Martínez $5 for his efforts.

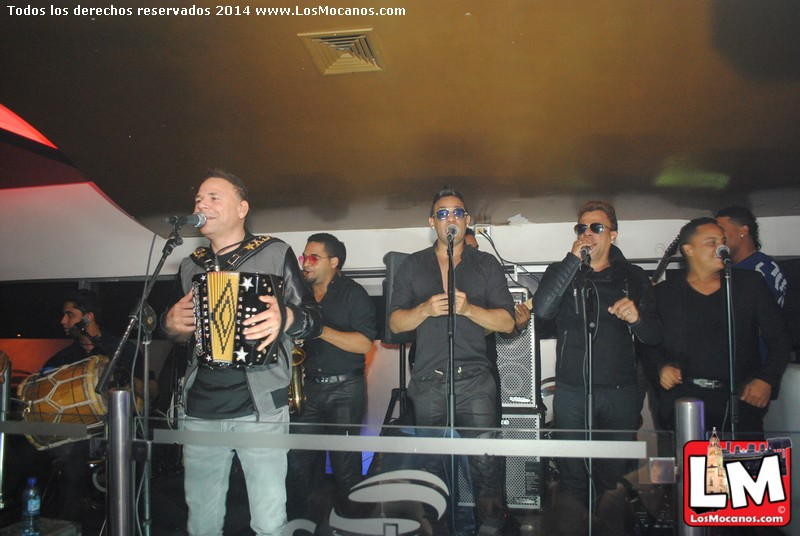
Dominican merengue típico artist El Prodigio playing accordion

Típico musicians continued to innovate within their style during the latter half of the twentieth century. Tatico Henríquez (d.1976), considered the godfather of modern merengue típico, replaced the marimba with electric bass and added a saxophone (it was used before, but infrequently) to harmonize with the accordion. A prolific composer, Tatico's influence cannot be overestimated: nationally broadcast radio and television appearances brought his music to all parts of the country, leading to widespread imitation of his style and dissemination of his compositions. Today, these works form the core of any típico musician's repertoire. Other innovations from this period include the addition of the bass drum now played by the güirero with a foot pedal, a development credited to Rafael Solano. Many of today's top accordionists also began their careers during this period, including El Ciego de Nagua, Rafaelito Román, and Francisco Ulloa.

=== Arrangements ===
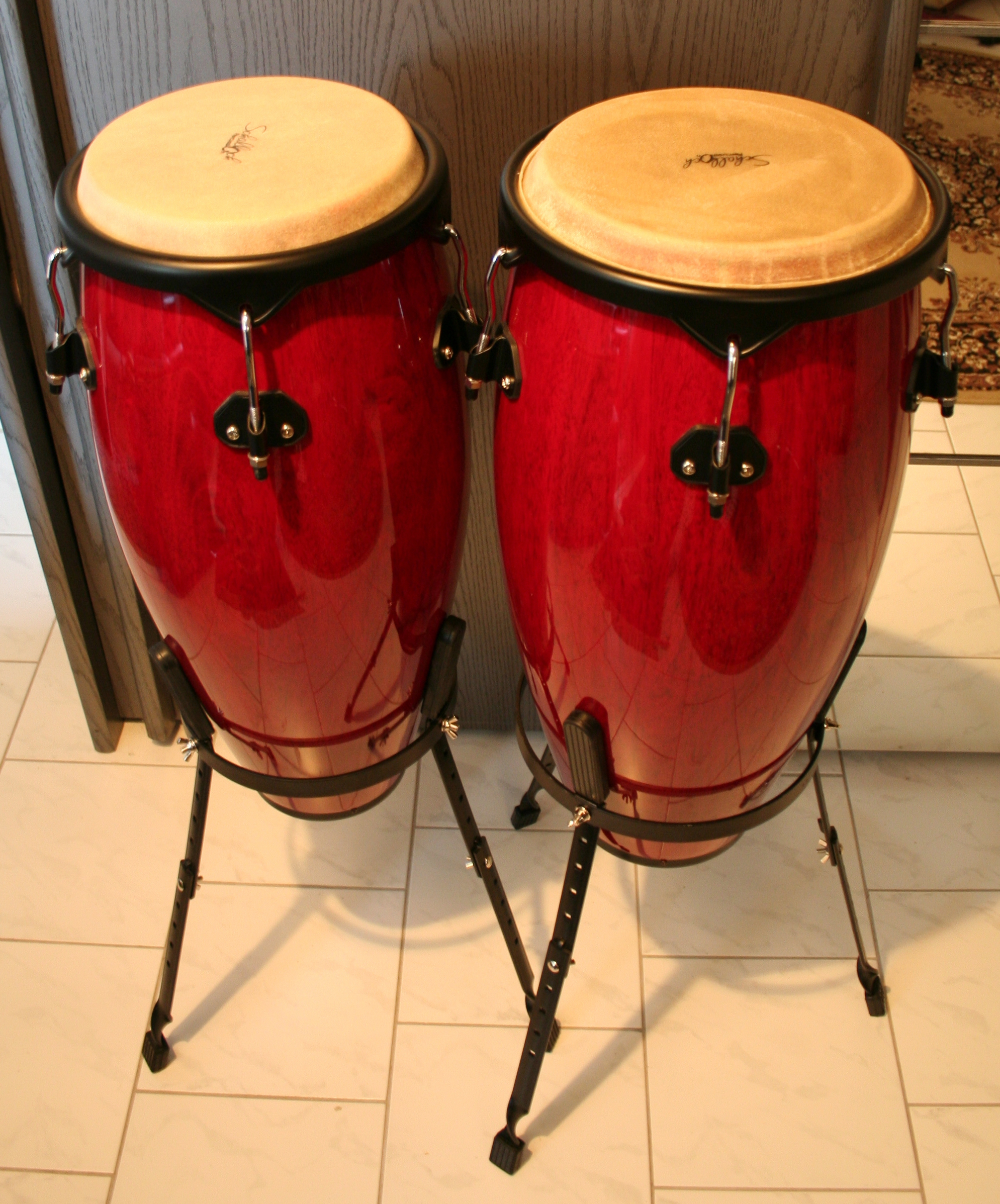
Conga drums

In the 1990s, most groups maintained the five-man lineup of accordion, sax, tambora, güira, and bass guitar, though a few new innovations have been made. Some modern band leaders have also added congas, timbales (played by the tamborero), and keyboards to their groups in an attempt to reach a wider audience and narrow the gap between the típico and orquesta styles. The most popular artist at present is El Prodigio, a young accordionist who is respected among típico musicians of all ages. Though he has become famous for recording his own compositions in a modern style, he is also able to perform all the "standards" of the traditional típico repertoire and is a talented, jazzy improviser. New York–based groups like Fulanito have experimented with the fusion of típico accordion with rap vocals. Young artists such as these have been able to bring merengue típico to new audiences.

Merengue típico songs are generally composed in two parts. The first section is rhythmically straightforward and is used to introduce the song's melodic and lyrical material; here, verses are sung and the only improvisation occurs at the end of song lines, when the accordion or saxophone fills in. The second section is dominated by improvisation, more complex rhythms, and hard-driving mambo, or the part of the song where melody instruments (sax and accordion) unite to play catchy, syncopated riffs or jaleos which help motivate and stimulate dancers. Típico rhythms include merengue derecho, or straight-ahead merengue, which is the kind of fast-paced 2/4 time merengue most of us are used to hearing, usually used in the first section. Pambiche or merengue apambichao is similar but usually slower, and can be recognized by the double slap rhythm on the tambora. Guinchao is a third rhythm combining the first two that is commonly heard in the second section of a merengue. Típico groups do not have to limit themselves to merengue as they can also play other traditional rhythms from the Dominican Republic and elsewhere, though this was more common in the past than at present. Mangulina and guaracha are now seldom heard; the latter is a clave-based style in 4/4 originally from Cuba, while the former is a 6/8 dance native to the Dominican Republic. Paseo was a slow introduction to a merengue song during which couples would promenade around the dance floor in stately fashion. Orquesta or big-band merengue became the merengue of choice for the urban Dominican middle and upper classes in the twentieth century. Although merengue had been played in upper-class salons as early as the 1850s, moralists like then-president Ulises Espaillat succeeded in banning the dance from such locations only two decades later, causing the merengue to effectively die out in the cities. Still, it was kept alive by rural musicians such as accordionist/composer Nico Lora, and it began to reappear in towns of the Cibao during the 1910s.

During that decade, several composers, including Julio Alberto Hernández, Juan Espínola of La Vega and Juan Francisco García of Santiago, tried to resuscitate the dance by creating orchestrated, written scores based on folk merengue melodies. One of these was García's 1918 work titled "Ecos del Cibao". Composer Luis Alberti later reported that such pieces, especially the famous tune known as the Juangomero, were frequently played at the end of an evening's program that otherwise featured imported styles like waltzes, mazurkas, polkas, danzas, danzones, and one- and two-steps.

While these early efforts in orchestrated merengue generally succeeded only in scandalizing their audiences, the political changes that occurred in the Dominican Republic over the next few years made a resurgence of the merengue possible. The resented North American invasion of 1916 seems to have made the general public more disposed to support autochthonous rhythms over imported ones, though the raucous rural accordion sound was still unacceptable to high-society tastes. Nevertheless, when Rafael Leonidas Trujillo took power in 1930, he imposed the merengue upon all levels of society, some say as a form of punishment for the elites that had previously refused to accept him. The soon-to-be dictator must also have realized the symbolic power of the rural folk music and its potential for creating support among the masses, since he took accordionists with him around the Republic during his campaign tours from the very beginning.

== Rafael Trujillo's effect on merengue ==
Until the 1930s, the music was considered "immoral" by the general population. Its more descriptive and colorful name, perico ripiao (literally "ripped parrot" in Spanish), was said to have been the name of a brothel in Santiago where the music was played. Moralists tried to ban merengue music and the provocative dance that accompanied it, but with little success.

Merengue experienced a sudden elevation of status during dictator Rafael Leónidas Trujillo's reign from 1930 to 1961. Although he was from the south rather than the Cibao, he did come from a rural area and from a lower-class family, so he decided that the rural style of perico ripiao should be the Dominican national symbol. He ordered numerous merengues to be composed in his honor. With titles like "Literacy", "Trujillo is great and immortal", and "Trujillo the great architect", these songs describe his virtues and extol his contributions to the country. Trujillo's interest in and encouragement of merengue helped create a place for the music on the radio and in respectable ballrooms. Luis Alberti and other musicians began to play with "big band" or orquesta instrumentation, replacing the accordion with a horn section and initiating a split between this new, mostly urban style and mostly rural perico ripiao. New York City Latino radio is still dominated by orquesta merengue.

Following his election, Trujillo ordered musicians to compose and perform numerous merengues extolling his supposed virtues and attractiveness to women. Luis Alberti and other popular bandleaders created a style of merengue more acceptable to the urban middle class by making its instrumentation more similar to the big bands then popular in the United States, replacing the accordion with a large brass section but maintaining the tambora and güira as a rhythmic base. They also composed lyrics free of the rough language and double-entendres characterizing the folk style. The first merengue to attain success at all levels of society was Alberti's famous 1936 work, "Compadre Pedro Juan". This was actually a resetting of García's "Ecos", itself based on earlier folk melodies, and thus it upheld a long-standing tradition in merengue típico of creating songs by applying new words to recycled melodies. The new, popular-style merengue began to grow in quite different directions from its predecessor, merengue típico. It became ever more popular throughout the country through its promotion by Petán Trujillo, the dictator's brother, on his state-sponsored radio station, La Voz Dominicana. Musicians like Luis Senior and Pedro Pérez kept listeners interested by inventing new variations like the "bolemengue" and "jalemengue".

Merengue does not have as plainly strong African origins as other forms of Dominican music, and therefore did not conflict with Trujillo's racist ideology. Trujillo promoted the music for political gain as a focus of national solidarity and political propaganda. It helped his efforts to unify a Dominican identity.

After Trujillo's assassination in 1961, the merengue orquesta underwent great change. During that decade, Johnny Ventura's Combo Show drove crowds wild with their showy choreography, slimmed-down brass section, and salsa influences. In the 1970s, Wilfrido Vargas sped up the tempo and incorporated influences from disco and rock. (The term "orquesta", simply meaning a large musical ensemble, is now used to describe the pop merengue groups based on Ventura's and Vargas's models as well as the older Alberti style.) In addition, a new rhythm called "merengue a lo maco" appeared and was popularized by groups including Los Hermanos Rosario and Cheche Abreu. Far less complicated than other merengue rhythms, it was particularly useful for adapting songs from other styles like bachata, Colombian vallenato, Mexican rancheras, and North American pop. This process of remaking is called fusilamiento and continues to be a source for many merengue hits to this day.

== Merengue around the world ==
Merengue has been heard in New York since the 1930s, when Eduardo Brito became the first to sing the Dominican national music there before going on to tour Spain. Salcedo-born, Juilliard-educated Rafael Petitón Guzmán formed the first Dominican-led band in the city with his Orquesta Lira Dominicana, which played in all the popular ballrooms in the 1930s and 1940s, while at the same time Angel Viloria played popular tunes on accordion with his "conjunto típico cibaeño" for Big Apple fans. However, it wasn't until the massive migration of Dominicans in the 1960s and 1970s that the music reached a mass audience. In 1967, Joseíto Mateo, Alberto Beltrán, and Primitivo Santos took merengue to Madison Square Garden for the first time. Later, New York–based groups like La Gran Manzana and Milly, Jocelyn y los Vecinos, a group unusual for being fronted by women, gained a following in the diaspora as well as back on the island.

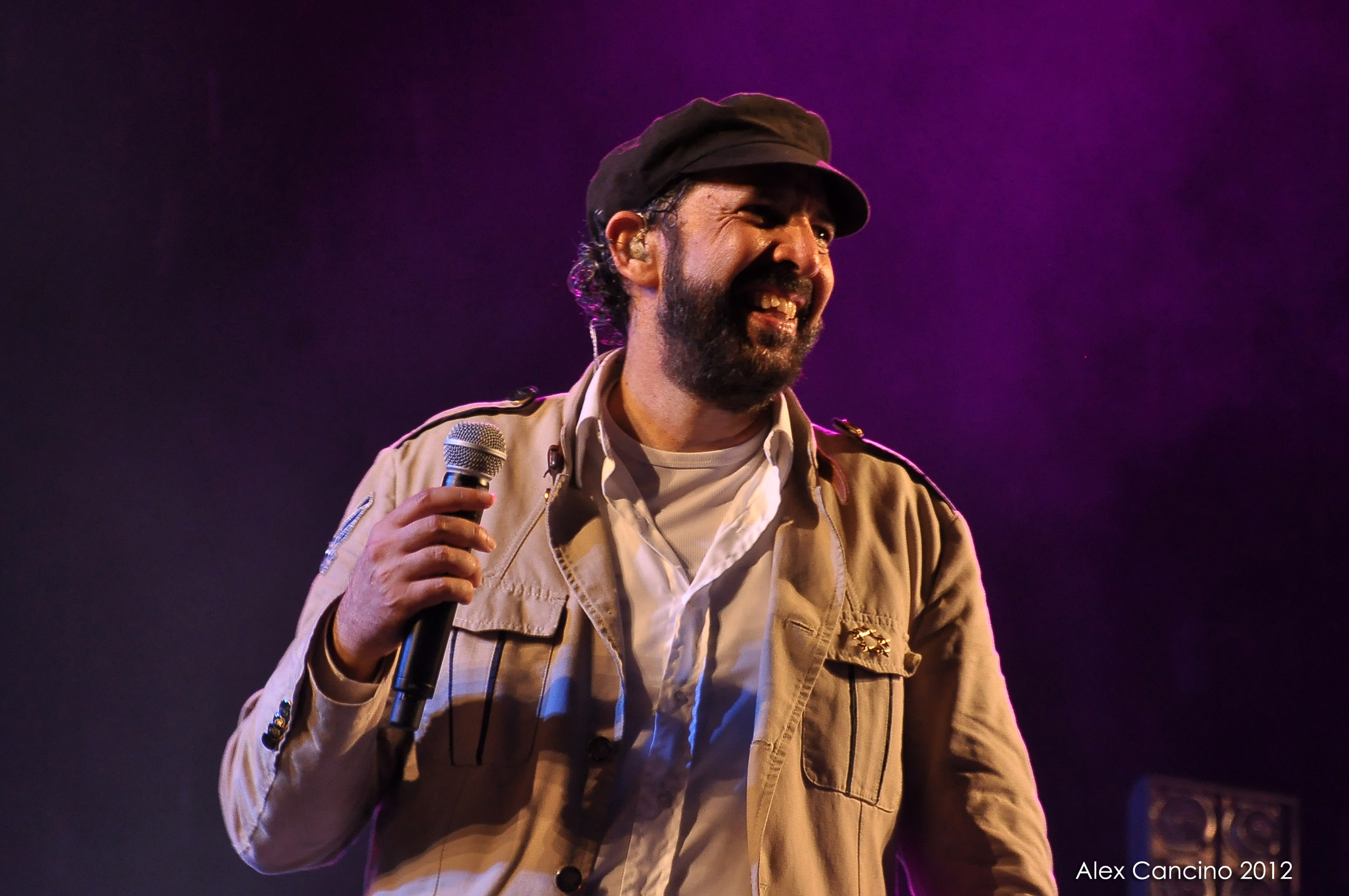
Juan Luis Guerra

By the 1980s, merengue was so big it was even beating out salsa on the airwaves. That decade was also notable for a boom in all-female orchestras, and Las Chicas del Can became particularly popular. Since then, musicians like Juan Luis Guerra, trained at Boston's Berklee school, Toño Rosario and former rocker Luis Díaz have brought merengue even further abroad, truly internationalizing the music. Guerra collaborated with African guitarists, experimented with indigenous Caribbean sounds, and explored Dominican roots music with típico accordionist Francisco Ulloa, while Díaz (an innovator since his work with 1970s folklore group Convite) fused merengue, rock, merengue típico, and bachata in his productions.

In the 21st century, orquesta musicians began to voice concern that their style would be eclipsed in popularity by bachata and merengue típico. Perhaps for this reason, some pop merengue singers have gone to extreme lengths to attract attention, such as Tulile and Mala Fe's excursions into women's wear. But even without such antics, recordings by groups like Los Toros Band, Rubby Pérez, Alex Bueno, Sergio Vargas, and the ever-popular Los Hermanos Rosario continue to sell well. Pop merengue also has a remarkably strong following on the neighboring island of Puerto Rico, which has produced its own stars, like Olga Tañón and Elvis Crespo.

In more urban settings, merengue is played with all manner of instrumentation, but the tambora and the güira are signatures. Today, merengue de orquesta is most popular. It uses a large horn section with paired saxophones, piano, timbales, hi-hat, backup singers, and conga, in addition to tambora, güira, and bass. In modern merengue típico a saxophone is an addition to the accordion, along with electric bass guitar. A proof of the great adaptability of the music can be found in the Dominican National Symphony's presentation in 2003 of a concert series entitled "Symphonic Merengue", in which the Symphonic Orchestra consisting of woodwinds, brass, strings, and the like played popular tunes.

== Distribution ==
Merengue music found mainstream exposure in other areas of Latin America in the 1970s and '80s, with its peak in the 1990s. In the Andean countries like Peru and Chile, merengue dance lost the characteristic of being danced close together, instead being danced separately while moving the arms.

== Women in merengue ==
Merengue, from its conception and through time, has classically been a male-dominated genre. In recent times, however, the genre has experienced a change in this situation. Several female artists and all-female bands have risen to relative stardom. This upheaval was influenced by the contributions of singer/bandleader Johnny Ventura's modernization of the sound of merengue in 1960, modernizing the sound from its "big-band"-esque setup with a quickening of tempo and inclusion of a visually-appealing element, with glitzy costumes and choreography. In the early 1970s, trumpeter and singer Wilfrido Vargas furthered the modernization of merengue by including electronic elements and strengthening the focus of a visual stage presence. These two men modernized the merengue stage, thereby increasing the palatability of a female merengue presence.

One of the most influential women in merengue is Fefita La Grande. Her birth name was Manuela Josefa Cabrera Taveras. She performed for Petán Trujillo, the brother of the Dominican Republic's president, convincing him to give her father a home and a job she could earn money from. Her rise to fame led to a great demand for her performances in New York, the Dominican Republic, and even Europe. Fefita's efforts forced men to work alongside women in merengue and accept that there is a place for them.

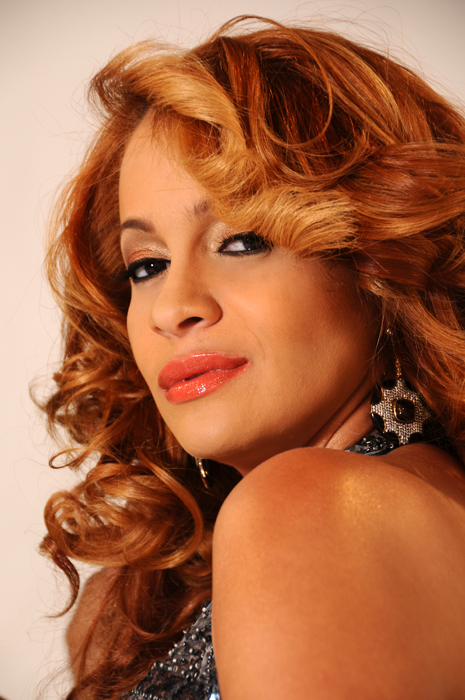
Miriam Cruz

Female merengue bands began to emerge in the 1970s, with examples such as Gladys Quero's "Orquesta Unisex", but started gaining popularity in the early 1980s with Aris García's "La Media Naranja", "Las Chicas del País" and, principally, pianist Belkis Concepcion's band, Las Chicas del Can. They are known by their fans as Las Reinas del Merengue, or in English, The Queens of Merengue. The band currently consists of eleven members, including horns, rhythm, dancers, and singers. After Belkis Concepcion left the band in 1985, Miriam Cruz took over as lead vocalist and led the band on tours through Europe. Soon after Concepcion followed the "mother figure" of merengue—Milly Quesada. She led the group Los Vecinos, which includes her sister Jocelyn and cousins Rafael and Martin, based in New York City. In reference to this female-merengue phenomena, Jocelyn Quesada states,

You know, if you wear a dress, and you have to open your legs and hold the tambora, that's kind of awkward. And also the brass instruments ... that's like macho territory. They never thought a woman could do that. They could play a violin, flute. They got up there, and they played those instruments, and people were shocked, and they were mostly curious to see if it works. The audience was not too thrilled; they thought, "Nah, well, a female group is not going to sound kosher."

Yet another notable all-female merengue group is the trio Chantelle. The women are Puerto Rican, not Dominican, and both this and their gender testify to merengue's growing popularity.

Las Chicas del Can was the first all-female band from the Dominican Republic, formed in 1981, which paved the road for other Latina artists. Known as "Las Reinas de Merengue", which means "The Queens of Merengue", they not only sang and danced, but also played a variety of instruments such as the trumpet, conga drums and the guitar. Las Chicas del Can were extremely successful, earning several platinum and gold records. Their hit single "El Negro No Puede" was later remade by Shakira, in her song "Waka Waka".

Milly Quezada was born as Milagros Quezada Borbon on May 21, 1955. She is a singer in Latin America. Her hometown is Dominican Republic. She graduated from New York City College with a communications degree. Then she was known as the Queen of Merengue, or La Reina de Merengue. She had a group with her two brothers and sister called Milly, Y Los Vecinos. The band would write songs about women's independence and freedom of choice.

== See also ==
- Latin Grammy Award for Best Merengue/Bachata Album
- Music of the Dominican Republic
- Latin American music
- Méringue (Haitian Style)
- Soraya Aracena

== Works cited ==
- Austerlitz, Paul. 1997. Merengue: Dominican music and Dominican identity. Philadelphia: Temple University Press.
- Díaz Díaz, Edgardo. 2008. “Danza antillana, conjuntos militares, nacionalismo musical e identidad dominicana: retomando los pasos perdidos del merengue.” Latin American Music Review 29(2): 229–259.
- Hutchinson, Sydney. 2016. Tigers of a different stripe: Performing gender in Dominican music. University of Chicago Press.
- Manuel, Peter (2006). Caribbean Currents: Caribbean Music from Rumba to Reggae (2nd ed.). Philadelphia: Temple University Press. ISBN 1-59213-463-7.
- Pérez de Cuello, Catana; Solano, Rafael (2005). El merengue: música y baile de la República Dominicana (PDF) (in Spanish). Santo Domingo: Trinitaria. ISBN 9945-406-04-3. Archived from the original (PDF) on 2011-07-19.

== Films ==
- 1984 - Caribbean Crucible. From Repercussions: A Celebration of African-American Music series, program 6. Directed by Dennis Marks and Geoffrey Haydon.
- 1990 - My Blue Heaven, starring Steve Martin, features extended episodes of merengue music and dancing.
