= Merengue típico =

Musical genre of the Dominican Republic

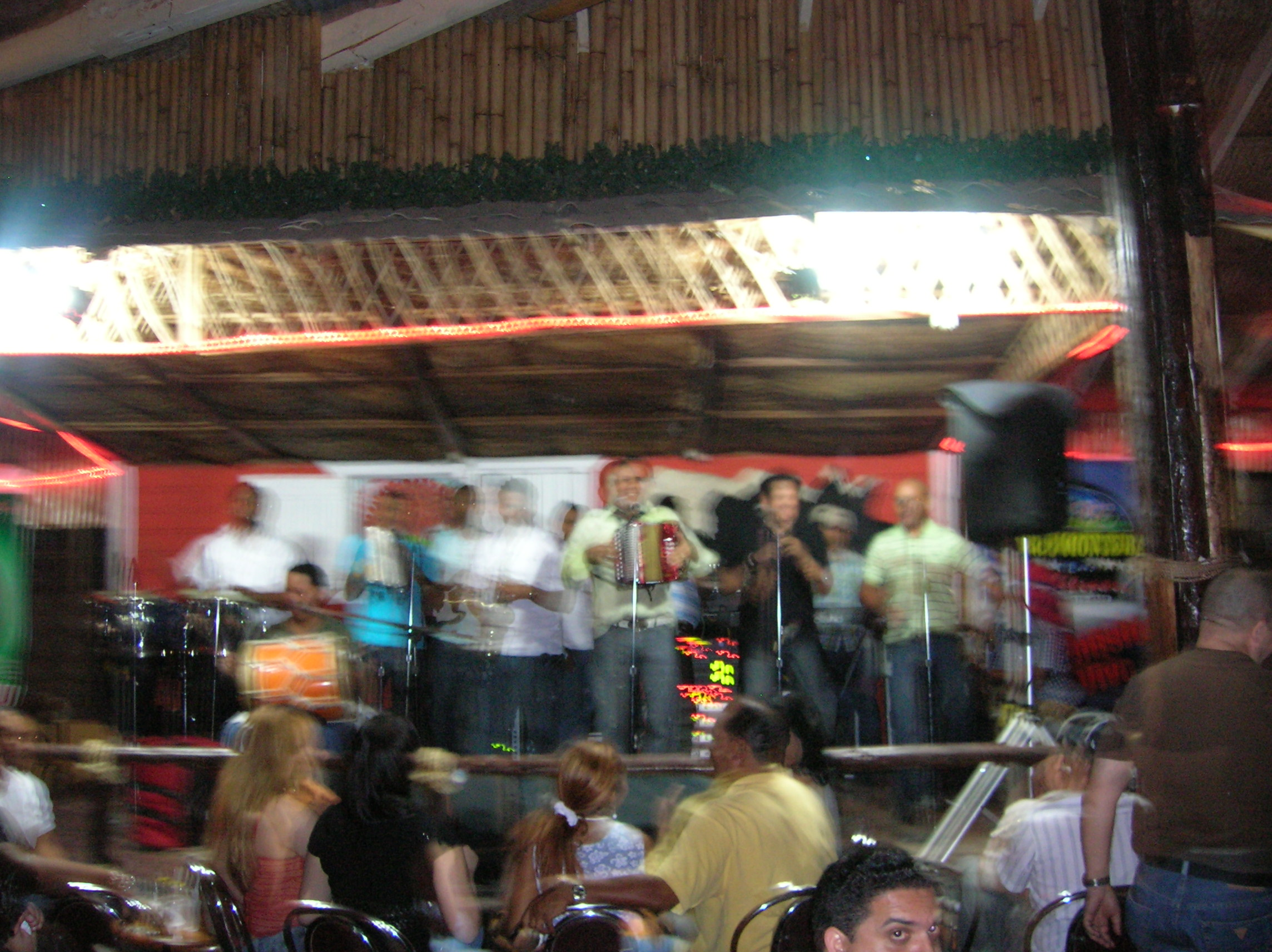
Merengue típico band playing in Santiago, Dominican Republic

Merengue típico (also known as merengue cibaeño or colloquially as perico ripia'o) is a musical genre of the Dominican Republic, and the oldest style of merengue. Merengue típico is the term preferred by most musicians as it is more respectful and emphasizes the music's traditional nature. The Instruments that are used are the accordion, bass guitar, güira, conga, and tambora (drum).

Merengue típico is the oldest style of merengue still performed today (usually in the Dominican Republic and the United States), its origins dating back to the 1850s. It originated in the rural city of Navarrete (villa bisono), northern valley region around the city of Santiago called the Cibao, resulting in the term "merengue cibaeño". Originally played on the metal scraper called güira, the tambora, and a stringed instrument (usually a guitar or a variant such as the tres). Stringed instruments were replaced with two-row diatonic button accordions when Germans began to travel to the island in the 1880s as part of the tobacco trade. Later, the marímbula, a bass lamellophone related to the African mbira, was added to fill out the sound. "Merengue típico" is very popular not only in the Dominican Republic but has migrated to the United States and many other countries.

== Early origins ==
Merengue first appears in the Caribbean in the 1850s. The earliest documented evidence of merengue in the Dominican Republic are newspaper articles complaining about this "lascivious" dance displacement of the earlier tumba.

Early merengue was played on stringed instruments, but the accordion came to the island in the 1880s, introduced by German traders, and quickly became the primary instrument in merengue.

Up until the 1930s, the music was considered immoral. Its more descriptive and colorful name, perico ripia'o (literally "ripped parrot" in Spanish) is said to have been the name of a bordello in Santiago where the music was played. Moralists tried to ban the music and the provocative dance that accompanied it, but with little success. Dictator Rafael Trujillo brought accordionists with him on the campaign trail, and once he took power, he ensured that merengue was embraced as a national music by all classes of Dominicans.

=== Possible origins ===
The origins of Merengue dance are unclear, but the city of Navarrete is believed to be the exact place of origin of merengue típico. The musician Nico Lora, a native of that town, perfected it and is the author of many well-known merengue themes as old as 100 years. Official versions promote the three-cultures origin, using the European accordion together with the African tambora and Taino guira.

=== Changes, fusions, and innovations ===
==== 1970–1980s ====
After Trujillo's assassination, Dominican society changed rapidly as processes of urbanization and migration accelerated. Merengue típico changed too. Through the efforts of artists like El Cieguito de Nagua, and particularly Tatico Henriquez, the music became faster and more technically demanding, while incorporating new instruments. They replaced marimba with electric bass, and added saxophone and congas.

The popularity of merengue overseas in New York during the 1980s caused a shift in the production of the genre in the Dominican Republic. The lyrics utilized less slang and language specific to Dominican dialects of Spanish to be understood by non-Dominican listeners. A shift to a faster rhythm for merengue performers also occurred, sparking a debate amongst Dominicans on whether the changes occurring should be considered merengue or another genre. Many feared too much international influence would change the style for the worse, losing the roots that made merengue popular to begin with.

==== 1990s–present ====
In the 1990s a new generation of musicians added a bass drum, played with a foot pedal by the "Guirero", and timbales, played by the "Tamborero" for fills. Agapito Pascual is credited with creating the new style termed "merengue con mambo" in 1987 with his recording, "La Vieja y su Pipa." Merengue con mambo refers to a merengue with a second section based on hard driving rhythms and riffs played by the accordion and saxophone together. This is the dominant style today that has been further explored by artists like Ricardo Gutierrez (El rey joven del acordeon) El Prodigio, Geovanny Polanco, Raul Roman (son of accordion legend Rafaelito Roman), Kerubanda and El Rubio Acordeón. Artists like Krisspy and Aguakate have pushed genre boundaries even further with more mambo and fusions with other rhythms like reggaeton, and many artists like Fulanito have fused merengue-style accordion playing with rap music. A new crop of merengue musicians, notably Limi-T 21, have attempted to create an orchestra merengue and perico ripia'o fusion on songs like "Que Lo Bailen". The bpm of the music has also transformed, originally between 130 and 140 [tempo], but today is sometimes sped up from 160 to 190 tempo.

== Rhythms ==
Today merengue típico actually consists of several different rhythms. Merengue derecho, or straight-ahead merengue, is the kind of fast-paced, march-like merengue Americans are most used to hearing. Pambiche or merengue apambichao is said to have developed during the American occupation of the Dominican Republic (1916–1924), taking its name from the "Palm Beach" fabric worn by American soldiers. Its tempo is usually slower than merengue derecho, and it can be recognized by the more syncopated rhythms in both bass and tambora. It is probably the rhythm most beloved by típico aficionados: dancing to it is said to require more skill since it is more complicated and syncopated than merengue derecho, and it helps to set the típico genre apart since it is used infrequently by orquesta groups. Guinchao is a third and more recently developed rhythm that is a combination of the other two. The once-common paseo, a slow introduction during which couples would promenade around the dance floor, is now common only in folkloric presentations. In the past, other dances like the mangulina, carabiné, polka, guarapo, and zarambo were also played on accordion, but are now generally heard only at folkloric presentations.

== Merengue terminology ==
In merengue, various slang is used to signify instruments, quality, the act of playing, etc. Below are a list of terms.

- Botao - slang for a solo. Usually on tambora, güira, accordion, or conga.
- Guayo - means "grater", another word for the güira instrument.
- Mambo - not to be confused with the Cuban music style of the same name, "Mambo" in a merengue context can be either merengue de orquesta or merengue típico, but a style of playing that involves heavy emphasis on conga, tambora, and cowbell riffs. Believed to be first popularized by accordionist Agapito Pascual, Merengue con Mambo sometimes involves solos, but is essentially a riff of saxophone or accordion repeating over a heavy rhythm. Most songs have a section within it dedicated to the Mambo, either nearing towards the end of the track or past the second verse of the song, but some songs are completely based on this style. Merengue con mambo is often played with a maco rhythm on the tambora, since it is can be played at a faster pace. The Pambiche rhythm is rarely used in merengue con mambo. Also can be used to shout out in songs, popularized by the likes of Geovanny Polanco, Aguakate, and El Prodigio.
- Golpe - a rhythm for güira, tambora, or conga.
- Cuero - generally means cowhide in Spanish, but in merengue refers most of the time to a tambora skin.
- Chivo - means goat, but refers to a goatskin for tambora.
- Merengue derecho - "straight" merengue, the kind which most are familiar with. A simplified version is played in the first part of a two-part merengue.
- Maco - borrowed from orquesta merengue, this tambora rhythm is essentially rim-slap-rim-open. Can be played the fastest.
- Pambiche - is another dance similar to merengue, with a more syncopated tambora rhythm for which many variations exist.
