= Tambora (Dominican drum) =

Type of drum

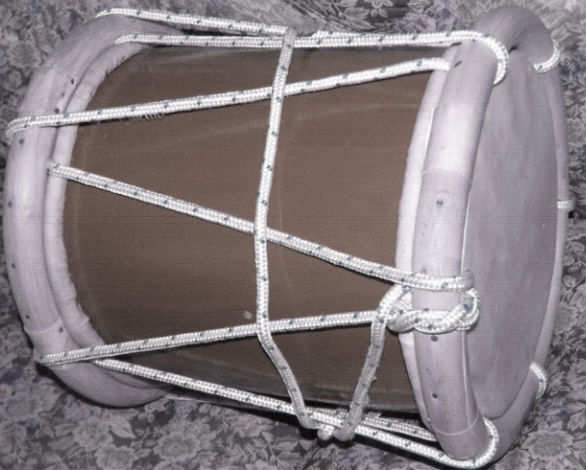
Tambora dominicana

The Dominican tambora (from the Spanish word tambor, meaning "drum") is a two headed drum played in merengue music. In many countries, especially the Dominican Republic, tamboras were made from salvaged rum barrels. Tambora players are called tamboreros.

== Types ==
There are three types of Tambora for the merengue style of music. The oldest kind is the rope-tuned tambora with black-colored heads. This is seen more in the folkloric music of the Dominican Republic. The second type, as made by modern companies, is bolt-tuned with conga heads. This kind usually has metal or wooden rims to hit as a filler for rhythms, sounding, if one strikes it correctly, something reminiscent of a wood block. This type can also be tuned to higher pitches and can sound like a conga.

== Role in Merengue ==
In merengue tipico, known also as perico ripiao (the oldest form of merengue), the tambora has a significantly large role, playing many different types of rhythms and variations on those rhythms. However, in orchestra merengue, the tambora usually only plays the merengue derecho rhythm as a background instrument, while congas are the main rhythm instrument, followed by the güira. In orchestra merengue, a separate performer for timbales can be seen very frequently, while in perico ripiao, the timbales and tambora are played most of the time by the same musician (timbales are used most of the time for fills, and, occasionally, solos). Timbales were introduced into the genre by Dominican percussionist Ray "Chino" Diaz.

== Basic strokes ==
There are three basic strokes: slap, rim/woodblock, and open tone: these three are all used in standard merengue rhythms, such as merengue derecho (most common merengue form) and pambiche.
