= Dominican salsa =

Music genre of Dominican Republic

While the Dominican Republic is known for shaping merengue and bachata music, its musicians have also melded these influences into the early development of salsa music amongst the Latin community of New York City in the early 1960s. A major development in those initial days of NYC’s Salsa genre occurred when Johnny Pacheco, a Dominican-born musician living in New York City, teamed with partner Jerry Masucci to create Fania Records in 1964. They started selling records from the trunk of cars on the streets of Spanish Harlem, signing up young Puerto Rican Salsa artists having created new sounds, and eventually having hit records. Over the next 15 years, Fania Records helped define the sound, culture, and language associated with the salsa genre, a musical movement that arose partly from the unavailability in the United States of music produced in Cuba.

== Early history and Cuban influence on Dominican salsa performers ==
Cuco Valoy, also known as "El Brujo" ("the wizard" or "the sorcerer"), is a Dominican salsero/sonero and ambassador for Afro-Cuban music. He studied music theory at the Dominican Republic's National Conservatory of Music. He first gained attention in the 1950s with his brother, Martin, in the music duo Los Ahijados. The brothers provided the vocals for the band Los Compadres from Cuba. Valoy appeared in the salsa scene originally as a sonero, one of the Cuban rhythms that later gave developed into the commercial name "Salsa", in the 1970s with his hits "Juliana" (later covered by the group DLG), "El Divorcio", and "Nació Varón". Cuco's son, Ramón Orlando, known as "El Maestro", one of the pioneers of merengue típico (considered "classic merengue") of the 1980s, continued the family legacy as musical conductor of the popular band La Orquesta Internacional. In 1992, Orlando received 7 Casandra Awards, including el Soberano, the top award of the ceremony. Also known as "El Maestro," Orlando has also been an influential contributor for his work behind Latin music. Orlando's influence and success continued for decades, including a Grammy win in 2005 for his merengue album "Generaciones".

Dominican Henry García has been a salsa singer for a number of years, performing with the salsa bands of both Valoy and Orlando, as well as singing on many albums by various bands, such as the hit album "Sobran Razones" by the group Fernando Echavarría de La Familia André.

Santiago Cerón was born in Santo Domingo, Dominican Republic in 1940 and was a singer with various Dominican and Cuban based bands, including Orquestra of Pete "El Conde" Rodriguez, Tony Pabon y La Protesta and the Orquesta de Arsenio Rodriguez. He went solo around 1970, and his first album was Tumbando Puertas, featuring the hit "Lindo Yambu". After that, Cerón became the Dominican face of salsa and son both in New York City and across South America.

In addition to co-creating the Fania Records label, influential in getting the sound of salsa out of local New York City clubs and into wider-distribution, Dominican-born musician Johnny Pacheco led the Fania All-Stars, a lineup featuring many of salsa's best performers, including Dominican-born Rey Reyes. Pacheco, as a performer, producer and bandleader, earned nine Grammy nominations, ten Gold records and many other awards throughout his career. Fania Records helped propel the popularity of the new sound and dance by signing innovative early salsa artists like Larry Harlow, Ray Barretto and Bobby Valentín.

A notable salsa performer from the Dominican Republic is José Alberto, known as "El Canario" (The Canary) for his widely adored voice, who was born in Santo Domingo in 1958. Alberto relocated to Puerto Rico with his family and later to New York in the early 1970s, where he sang with several orchestras. He received international attention as the bandleader of Típica 73 in October 1977. In 1983, Alberto hired a group of well-known musicians to perform as José Alberto "El Canario" y Su Orquesta. In 1991, Alberto released his first album, Dance With Me, and saw success from the album's romantic lyrics combined with energetic salsa arrangements. Over the next few years he released albums and singles on the CBS and Sony labels, before signing with RMM Records in 1997. Alberto's influence is shown in his numerous Gold and Platinum records.

Another salsa star from the Dominican Republic is Raulín Rosendo, known as "El sonero enfadado" (The Angry Sonero). Born in 1957, by age 12 Rosendo was already performing with the merengue group, "El Chivo y su Banda." Rosendo was soon performing on a show televised on the Rahintel network, and by 19 had been signed to perform with a band led by Cuco Valoy. Rosendo later became co-leader, with Fernandito Villalona, of the group "Los Hijos del Rey." These groups performed salsa and merengue in large venues in New York City and abroad, leading to Rosendo recording numerous albums, including five on the Kubaney label. In 1981, Rosendo formed his own orchestra and for the first time produced as a soloist for his project, "El que te Guia." His 1995 album Uno Se Cura was nominated for at the Casandra Awards and the New York Latin ACE Awards. He had more hit songs in 1996, 1997, 1998 and 1999.

== Contemporary Dominican salsa ==
Dominican salsa continued to grow through the turn of the 21st century. For example, Juan Miguel Batista, also known as Michel "El Buenón", is an active salsero in the Dominican Republic. Michel sang with several merengue and méringue (a Haitian sound) groups, before recording his first album in 1995. He received three Casandra Award nominations in 2008.

The salsero known as Sexappeal is another performer who emerged during this period. He made his debut as a salsero in 2000 with the support of Ramón Orlando, and received a nomination at the Casandra Awards and a nomination for "Revelation of the Year" at the Lo Nuestro Awards. In a 2008 interview, he stated that "Right now the local salsa is well positioned, and thanks to God, what we are doing is reaching foreign beaches and achieving major awards."

Belio Antonio is a professor at the University of Florida, in addition to being a popular salsa performer. Antonio was born in Puerto Rico, grew up in the salsa movement in New York City, then moved with his parents to the Dominican Republic in the early 1980s. These diverse experiences as a Dominican, Puerto Rican and New Yorker all contribute to his salsa music. By the time he was 9, Belio Antonio was playing the guitar and singing Spanish bolero in the Dominican Republic, transitioning to Jazz and salsa as he performed vocals for Jazz groups in New York and a salsa group in Florida. Antonio released his first album, Belio Antonio: Autentico.

Mickey Taveras is a Dominican salsero and songwriter who started as a composer for stars like Wilfrido Vargas. After Sergio Vargas Garibaldo helped make Taveras' song "La Ventanita" an international success, Taveras went on to a solo career with his first album Lucharé, which went triple platinum in Colombia and Central America and had great success in Venezuela and Mexico in 1996. In 2000, Mickey Taveras self-produced a Latin pop/ballad album called Más Romantico that had sold well.

== Other contributors to Dominican salsa ==
Producers, composers and musical directors have also contributed to the success of Dominican salsa.

Juan Valdez is a composer and orchestral director of salsa music in the Dominican Republic. Valdez has composed music for Asdrubar and helped jumpstart Michel "El Buenón"'s career, and has prepared arrangements of songs for numerous other vocalists. Valdez, born in 1962, played with merengue bands in his early years, including Sergio Vargas. In addition to writing music for the new generation of salsa artists, he is also training tomorrow's pianists and musicians, teaching popular piano and popular music orchestration at the Dominican Republic`s Conservatorio Nacional de Música (National Conservatory of Music). In 2009, Valdez was nominated for his 13th Casandra Award for Best Orchestration and Musical Arranger.

Bienvenido Rodríguez is a salsa producer who began his career working with bachata music. Before becoming a producer, Rodríguez worked as a traveling salesman of merengue típico records in the Dominican Republic, then opened his own record store on Avenida Duarte in the Ciudad Colonial section of Santo Domingo. In 1967, Rodríguez bought a small record label, renamed it Karen after his daughter, and started producing records focused on merengue típico. By the early 1970s, he track record allowed him to obtain the exclusive distributorship for the salsa music produced by Fania Records. By the 1980s, Karen Records had become the Dominican Republic's largest and most successful label, producing many of the nation's top musicians.

== Notable Dominican singers and songs ==
- Alex Matos: Si Entiendieras
- Asdrubar: Suelta mi mano
- Belio Antonio: Ella Fue; Tortura de Amor; No Se Compra; No Temas Mi Cariñito"; Te Fuiste Una Vez Más
- Cuco Valoy: Juliana; El Divorcio; Nació Varón
- Henry Garcia: Te Quiero; Sisi y Ricardo; Nació Varón
- Johnny Pacheco: Dile; Quiero Ser; Soy Guapo De Verdad
- José Alberto "El Canario": Mis Amores; Sueno Contigo; Llego la Hora; A La Hora Que Me Llamen Voy
- MioSotis: Señora
- Michel el Buenón: Cuando los Sapos Bailen Flamenco; Maldito el Tiempo; Ese Tipo Soy Yo
- Raulín Rosendo: Amor en Secreto; Si No Van A Morir Mi Muerte; Pagina Blanca; Estamos En Navidad; Te Lo Pido Por Favor; Fatlidad; Sin Tituveos; Uno Se Cura; Lady Laura; Deseo
- Santiago Cerón: Lindo Yambu
- Sexappeal: La Primera Piedra; Meniando La Cola; Mal O Bien
- Vicky Shell: Como Una Sombra
- Yiyo Sarante: Manos de Tijera
