= List of songs written by Ramón Orlando =

This list contains songs written by Ramón Orlando, a Dominican musician, pianist, arranger, producer, and singer.

Many of Ramón Orlando's songs are interpreted by himself, Cuco Valoy, and their bands Los Virtuosos and La Tribu. This list include also songs interpreted by other artists such as Alberto Beltrán, Antony Santos, Elvis Crespo, Milly Quezada, Miriam Cruz, Rubby Pérez, Manny Manuel, Sergio Vargas, Sexappeal, Yoskar Sarante, and others.

Sortable table
Song title	Artist(s)	Release	Year released	Notes
Perdidos	Ramón Orlando and Raquel Arias	Perdidos - Single	2022	
El Venao	Los Cantantes de Ramón Orlando	El Virao	1995	BMI Award Winning Song
Meneando la Cola	Sexappeal	Necesito Más	2003	BMI Award Winning Song
Amada Mía	José Alberto "El Canario"	Differente	2001	
América Sin Queja	Ramón Orlando	América Sin Queja	1993	
A la Mala	Ramón Orlando	América Sin Queja	1993	
Ahí Ombe	Cuco Valoy	Bien Sobao	1982	
Ahí Va María	Ramón Orlando	Special Edition, Merengue, Jazz Y Un Poco Mas	2021	
Ahora que Estamos Solos	Ramón Orlando	Crónicas	2000	
Al Derecho y Al Reves	Cuco Valoy	Bien Sobao	1982	
Amándote Como Te Amo	Ramón Orlando	El Hijo de la Mazurca	1990	
Amor Para Mi	Ramón Orlando	El Duro	2007	
Ay! Lola	Ramón Orlando	Special Edition, Merengue, Jazz Y Un Poco Mas	2021	
Bailando	Ramón Orlando y Orquesta Internacional	Diciembre Party	1987	
Bailarás, Gozarás	Los Virtuosos	Super Hits Salsosos	1979	
Balada de Amor	Ramón Orlando	El Hijo de la Mazurca	1990	
Bazucaso de Amor	Antony Santos featuring Joe Veras	Bazucaso de Amor - Single	2013	
Besa y Toca	ULS	United Latin for Salsa	2000	Lead Vocals by Sexappeal
Bon, Bon, Bon	Ramón Orlando	Ramón Orlando presenta: Feny & Diomedes – Juntos	1990	
Cantando se Fue	Los Virtuosos	Tremenda Salsa	1978	
Canto Latino	Los Virtuosos	Nació Varón	1980	
Carmelina	Ramón Orlando y sus Virtuosos	Murió el Sonero	1978	
Caro	Milly Quezada	MQ	2005	
Cásate	Cuco Valoy y los Virtuosos	Sin Comentarios	1981	
Catalino el Dischoso	Ramón Orlando	Ramón Orlando presenta: Feny & Diomedes – Juntos	1990	
Chiquita	Ramón Orlando	Ramón Orlando presenta: Feny & Diomedes – Juntos	1990	
Ciego de Amor	Cuco Valoy y los Virtuosos	Chevere	1982	
Cigarro y Vino	Ramón Orlando y Orquesta Internacional	Diciembre Party	1987	
Claudia	Ramón Orlando	El Hijo de la Mazurca	1990	
Clavelitos y Azucenas	Cuco Valoy y los Virtuosos	Sin Comentarios	1981	
Como Tú	Ramón Orlando	El Duro	2007	
Con Lámpara o Con Vela	Milly Quezada	Merenhits 2005	2005	
Corazón Atadao	Ramón Orlando	Con el Corazón Atao	2000	
Corazón Barato	Ramón Orlando	Evolución	1997	
Cosas	Los Virtuosos	Arrollando	1979	
Creíste	Antony Santos	Creíste - Single	2013	Awarded Best Bachata of the Year 2013 at Soberano Awards
Crónicas	Ramón Orlando	Crónicass	2000	
Cuando Quieras	Los Virtuosos de Cuco Valoy	Salsa con Coco	1978	
Cuánto se Llora	Ramón Orlando	Evolución	1997	
Cuídala	ULS	United Latin for Salsa	2000	Lead Vocals by Sexappeal
Culpable o No	Manny Manuel	Lleno de Vida	1999	
Cúrame	Ramón Orlando	América sin Queja	1993	
Daniel	Los Virtuosos de Cuco Valoy	Salsa con Coco	1978	
Danza No. 1	Los Virtuosos de Cuco Valoy	Salsa con Coco	1978	
Déjame Intentarlo	Ramón Orlando	Solo Ganar	1991	
Diciembre Party	Ramón Orlando y Orquesta Internacional	Diciembre Party	1987	
Dile que se Aguante	Ramón Orlando	América sin Queja	1993	
Dime Tú	Ramón Orlando	América sin Queja	1993	
Don Jaime	Sexappeal	Mal o Bien	2006	
Dos Extraños Locos	Ramón Orlando	El Hijo de la Mazurca	1990	
Dueño, Amo y Señor	Ramón Orlando	Evolución	1997	
El Aborto	Cuco Valoy y los Virtuosos	Sin Comentarios	1982	
El Anillo	Ramón Orlando (featuring Senovia Nova)	Special Edition, Merengue, Jazz Y Un Poco Mas	2021	
El Antídoto	Rubby Pérez	No Te Olvides	1998	
El Borracho	Ramón Orlando	Merenhits ’06	2005	
El Bufón	Ramón Orlando	América sin Queja	1993	
El Consejo	Cuco Valoy y los Virtuosos	Tiza!	1980	
El Cuaderno	Los Cantantes de Ramón Orlando	El Virao	1995	
El Juicio	Los Virtuosos	¡No me Empuje!	1975	
El Lío de Mi Vecino	Los Virtuosos	¡Corre Policia, Corre!	1976	
El Negro que Suda Miel	Sexappeal	Necesito Más	2006	
El Olor de Tu Sudor	Ramón Orlando	En Tierra Ajena	2006	
El Perro Ajeno	Rubby Pérez	Tonto Corazón	2004	
El Pozo	Cuco Valoy y Los Virtuosos	El Líder	1983	
El Primo	Sexappeal	Mal o Bien	2006	
El Que A Hierro Mata	Cuco Valoy & Los Virtuosos	Sin Comentarios	1981	
El Que No Sabe, No Adivina	Los Virtuosos	Tremenda Salsa	1978	
El Señor	Cuco Valoy & Los Virtuosos	Sonero Y Merenguero	1983	
El Silencio, Tú Y Yo	Ramón Orlando y Orquesta Internacional	Ring... Ring!	1989	
El Sombrero	Ramón Orlando	Evolución	1997	
Stress	Ramón Orlando	Evolución	1997	
En La Boca de los Tiburones	Ramón Orlando y su Orquesta Internacional	Todos!	1992	
Eres	Ramón Orlando	Ganar	1991	
Es Tuya	Ramón Orlando	América Sin Queja	1993	
Esa Loca	Miriam Cruz	Siempre Diva	2013	
Esa Negra	Ramón Orlando	El Duro	2007	
Escobita Nueva	Yoskar Sarante	Vuelve Vuelve	2008	
Esta Noche	Sexappeal	Porque No Vienes	2011	
Estas Lágrimas	Ramón Orlando	Ganar	1991	
Este Amor	Ramón Orlando	El Hijo de la Mazurca	1990	
Esto Fue lo Que Vi	Ramón Orlando	América Sin Queja	1993	
Facundo	Los Virtuosos	Arrollando	1979	
Falta de Amor	Ramón Orlando	Ganar	1991	
Fantasía Verano	Sexappeal	Necesito Más	2003	
Feo y Flaco	Los Cantantes de Ramón Orlando	El Virao	1995	
Fiel	Ramón Orlando	Ganar	1991	
Fiesta	Ramón Orlando	Ramón Orlando presenta: Feny & Diomedes – Juntos	1990	Lead Vocals by Feny Ortiz
Fruta Fina	Ramón Orlando featuring Antony Santos	Ramón Orlando con Antony Santos	1994	
Golozéamela	Ramón Orlando	En Tierra Ajena	2006	
Hay Amores	José Alberto "El Canario"	Then and Now	2004	
Homejane a Matamoros	Los Virtuosos	¡Corre Policia, Corre!	1976	
Ileal	Ramón Orlando	Generaciones	2004	
Isabel	Cuco Valoy y los Virtuosos	Tiza!	1980	
Jamás	Sergio Vargas	Merenhits 2005	2004	
Joven	Cuco Valoy con Los Virtuosos	El Magnífico Cuco Valoy	1980	
La Carnada	Miriam Cruz	Punto y Aparte	2001	
La Computadora	Los Cantantes de Ramón Orlando	El Virao	1995	
La Guayaba Podrida	Miriam Cruz	Punto y Aparte	2001	
La Jefa	Ramón Orlando	Merenhits ’93	1992	
La Llorona	ULS	United Latin for Salsa	2000	Lead Vocals by Sexappeal
La Loba	Miriam y las Chicas	Nueva Vida	1993	
La Marea	Sexappeal	Mal o Bien	2006	
La Novela	Ramón Orlando	En Tierra Ajena	2006	
La Pastilla	Ramón Orlando	Special Edition, Merengue, Jazz Y Un Poco Mas	2021	
La Temperatura	Los Virtuosos	Un Momento !...Llegaron Los Virtuosos	1977	
Ladrona	Las Chicas del País	Ladrona - Single	1991	
Lápiz	Ramón Orlando y Orquesta Internacional	Diciembre Party	1987	
Licencia	Deddie Romero	Más De Mi	1998	
Lléname de Amor	Ramón Orlando	Ganar	1991	
Lo Que Siento Por Ti	Los Virtuosos	Un Momento !...Llegaron Los Virtuosos	1977	
Lo Quieras o No	Ramón Orlando	Generaciones	2004	
Loco de Amor	Ramón Orlando y su Orquesta Internacional	Orquesta Internacional	1986	
Loco Loco	Ramón Orlando featuring Antony Santos	Ramón Orlando con Antony Santos	1994	
Los Soneros de Ayer	Cuco Valoy	El Brujo (Volumen 2)	1987	
Los Tres Besos	Ramón Orlando	Merenhits 2005	2004	
Los Trillisos	Sexappeal	Necesito Más	2003	
Luna Llena	Ramón Orlando	En Tierra Ajeja	2006	
Macondo	Sexappeal	Necesito Más	2003	
Magdalena	Ramón Orlando	Disfraces	2003	
Mal o Bien	Sexappeal	Mal o Bien	2006	
Malas Palabras	Ramón Orlando	Con el Corazón Atao	2000	
Mamá	Ramón Orlando	América SIn Queja	1993	
Mamá Mía	Ramón Orlando	Ring...Ring	1989	
Maniquí	Manny Manuel	Rey De Corazones	1995	
Mariana Engracia	Cuco Valoy y Los Virtuosos	Tiza!	1980	
Más	Ramón Orlando	Ramón Orlando presenta: Feny & Diomedes – Juntos	1990	
Matilda	Cuco Valoy y Los Virtuosos	Matilda	1982	
Me Enamoro	Antony Santos	Me Enamoro - Single	2013	Co-authored with César Antonio Sánchez
Me Hace Bien	Los Cantantes	El Virao	1995	
Me la Voy a Llevar	Ramón Orlando	Todos!	1992	
Me Mata la Pena	Ramón Orlando	Todos!	1992	
Me Molesta	Manny Manuel	Es Mi Tiempo	1998	
Me Olvidé de TI	Los Virtuosos	Mi Tumbao	1982	
Me Quieres o Me Voy	Los Virtuosos	Arrollando	1979	
Media Vida	Ramón Orlando	En Tierra Ajena	2006	
Mi Cama No Habla	Ramón Orlando	Crónicas	2000	
Mi Gran Amor	Ramón Orlando Featuring Miriam Cruz	Merenhits 2007	2006	
Mi Novia Viuda	Ramón Orlando	Evolución	1997	
Mi Locura	Ramón Orlando	Ramón Orlando presenta: Feny & Diomedes – Juntos	1990	
Mi Sueño	Ramon Orlando	Diciembre Party	1987	
Mi Tierra	El Conde Sonero Pichardo Featuring Ramon Orlando Valoy	Cristo Fania All Stars 2	2021	
Mi Tumbao	Los Virtuosos	¡Corre Policia, Corre!	1976	Lead Vocals Raulín Rosendo
Michaeren	Cuco Valoy y su Tribu	Los Titanes de la Tribu	1978	Lead Vocals Henry Hierro
Mil Maneras	Ramon Orlando	El Hijo de la Mazurca	1990	
Mira Mis Ojos	Ramon Orlando	El Duro	2007	
Mitad Inglés, Mitad Español	Ramon Orlando y Orquesta Internacional	Todos!	1992	
Monotonía	Ramon Orlando y Orquesta Internacional	Diciembre Party	1987	
Muerto el Perro	Milly Quezada	Merenhits 2007	2006	
Murió el Sonero	Ramón Orlando y sus Virtuosos	Murió el Sonero	1978	
Nació Varón	Los Virtuosos	Nació Varón	1980	
Nada Sin Ti	Ramón Orlando	Con el Corazón Atao	2000	
New York No Duerme	Ramón Orlando	El Hijo de la Mazurca	1990	
Ni es Estúpida ni Bruta	Rubby Pérez	Grandes Éxitos	2010	
Ni le Vas ni Me Dejas	Ramon Orlando y Orquesta Internacional	Todos!	1992	
Nicolás	Los Virtuosos	Tremenda Salsa	1978	Lead Vocals Henry García
No Eres una Más	Ramon Orlando	En Tierra Ajena	2006	
No Hay Pesos	Los Cantantes	El Virao	1995	
No Hay Pesos para Contar	Grupo La Fuerza Featuring Grupo Manía	¡Y Que Nadie Se Meta!	1994	
No Hay Que Preguntarlo	Los Virtuosos de Cuco Valoy	Salsa con Coco	1978	
No la Molestes Más	Los Cantantes	El Virao	1995	
No La Vuelvas A Querer	Cuco Valoy & Los Virtuosos	Sin Comentarios . . .	1982	
No Me Sirve de Nada	Ramón Orlando	Con el Corazón Atao	2001	
No Te Importa No	Ramón Orlando y Orquesta Internacional	Diciembre Party	1987	
No Te Irás	Sexappeal	Mal o Bien	2006	
Noche Eterna	Ramón Orlando y Orquesta Internacional	Ring... Ring	1989	
Noche y Rumba	Ramón Orlando y Orquesta Internacional	Todos!	1992	
Nupcias	Ramón Orlando	El Hijo de la Mazurca	1990	
Pa Gozar Contigo	Los Virtuosos De Cuco Valoy	Salsa con Coco	1978	
Pa’ Tenerme Ahi	Cuco Valoy & Los Virtuosos	El Líder	1983	
Para Amarlo	Ramón Orlando	En Tierra Ajena	2006	
Para Olvidarte	Ramón Orlando	El Hijo de la Mazurca	1990	
Pena	Ramón Orlando	Ring... Ring	1989	
Por Él	Ramón Orlando	América Sin Queja	1993	
Por Qué No Dejas Ese Loco	Sexappeal	Necesito Más	2003	
Por Qué No Vienes	Sexappeal	Por Qué No Vienes	2011	
Preciosa Mujer	Ramón Orlando	El Duro	2007	
Pronto Amor	Ramón Orlando y su Orquesta Internacional	Orquesta Internacional	1986	
Qué Bolero	Ramón Orlando	Generaciones	2004	
Que Le Den Candela	Cuco Valoy & Los Virtuosos	El Lider	1983	
Que Me lo Cuente Otro	José Alberto "El Canario"	Original	2011	
Qué Tiene Él	Ramón Orlando	Evolución	1997	
Que Venga	Ramón Orlando	América Sin Queja	1993	
Quédate Amor	Los Cantantes de Ramón Orlando	Éxitos De Los Cantantes de Ramón Orlando	2013	Lead Vocals Feny Ortiz
Quererte es mi Verdad	Ramón Orlando	El Hijo de la Mazurca	1990	
Quiéreme	Cuco Valoy & Los Virtuosos	Sin Comentarios ...	1981	
Quiéreme Ahora	Ramón Orlando	Ganar	1991	
Quiero de Ti	Ramón Orlando	Ganar	1991	
Quiero Ser	Milly Quezada	MQ	2005	
Rapidito	Miguel Angel	Vine an Amarte	2007	
Rica Boca	Ramón Orlando	Evolución	1997	
Ring Ring	Ramón Orlando y Orquesta Internacional	Ring... Ring	1989	
Risas	Ramón Orlando y Orquesta Internacional	Ring... Ring	1989	
Rita Caimana	Cuco Valoy & Los Virtuosos	Chevere	1982	
Salsa Caliente	Los Virtuosos	¡No Me Empuje!	1978	
Se Acaba el Amor	Ramón Orlando	El Tiki Tiki Del Amor	2002	
Sebastian El Vago	Cuco Valoy & Los Virtuosos	Sin Comentarios ...	1981	
Señora Tambora	Elvis Crespo Featuring Sergio Vargas	Urbano	2002	
Será Hoy	Ramón Orlando	Ganar	1991	
Si No Te Puedo Amar	Ramón Orlando	Bryant	1999	
Sin las Dos	Ramón Orlando	América Sin Queja	1993	
Sin Ti	ULS	United Latin for Salsa	2000	Lead vocals by Sexappeal
Sisi y Ricardo	Cuco Valoy	El Magnífico Cuco Valoy con los Virtuosos	1980	Lead Vocals by Henry García
Solo Tú	Ramón Orlando	Ramon Orlando presenta: Feny & Diomedes – Juntos	1990	
Solo una Noche	Ramón Orlando	El Hijo de la Mazurca	1990	
Soy Libre	ULS	United Latin for Salsa	2000	Lead vocals by Sexappeal
Soy Tu León	Ramón Orlando	Todos	1992	
Soy Tuyo	Ramón Orlando	Evolución	1997	
Soy Uno de Esos	Rubby Pérez	No Te Olvides	1998	
El Súper Macho	Cuco Valoy	La Cuca de Cuco	2015	
Te Amo	Ramón Orlando	Todos!	1992	
Te Compro Tu Novia	Ramón Orlando	América Sin Queja	1993	Interprete Oficial Alexis Palacio (Leonel Alexis de Jesús Peña Ortiz)
Te Espero	Ramón Orlando	América Sin Queja	1993	
Te Extraño	Cuco Valoy y La Tribu	Qué Será Lo Que Quiere El Negro?	1983	
Te Juro Que Te Quiero	Ramon Orlando	Orquesta Internacional	1986	
Te Lo Regalo	Eva La Cuchi	La Cuchi	1999	
Te Quiero	Cuco Valoy y Los Virtuosos	Tiza!	1980	
Te Quiero de Veras	Ramón Orlando	Bryant	1999	
Te Voy a Hacer un Bolero	Ramón Orlando	Bryant	1999	
Tendré	Ramón Orlando	Evolución	1997	
Tengo Envidia	Los Hermanos Rosario	Aura	2007	
Tiene Candela	ULS	United Latin for Salsa	2000	Lead vocals by Sexappeal
Tililin	Ramón Orlando	Disfraces	2003	
Timana	Cuco Valoy y los Virtuosos	Chevere	1982	
Toda Hora	Ramón Orlando	Generaciones	2004	
Tonto Corazón	Ramón Orlando	América Sin Queja	1993	
Torpe Corazón	Ramón Orlando	En Tierra Ajena	2006	
Tres	Rubby Pérez	No Te Olvides	1998	
Tú Eres La Única	Los Virtuosos de Cuco Valoy	Tremenda Salsa	1979	
Ula Ula	Ramón Orlando	Evolución	1997	
Un Día	Ramón Orlando	América Sin Queja	1993	
Un día Más	Ramón Orlando	Ring...Ring	1989	
Un Ratito Más	Ramón Orlando	El Hijo de la Mazurca	1990	
Un Tipo En El Armario	Cuco Valoy & Los Virtuosos	Sin Comentarios...	1981	
Vas a Volver	Ramón Orlando	Crónicas	2000	
Ven	Alberto Beltrán	Cuco y Ramon Orlando Valoy Presentan an Alberto Beltrán	1984	
Venerada Mujer	Cuco Valoy & Los Virtuosos	Sin Comentarios ...	1982	
Vicio	Deddie Romero	Más De Mi	1998	
Vivo Llorando	Ramón Orlando	El Hijo de la Mazurca	1990	
Voy	Ramón Orlando	El Hijo de la Mazurca	1990	
Vuelve	Ramón Orlando	Crónicass	2000	
Y Cómo Se Lo Digo	Rubby Pérez	No Te Olvides	1998	
Y Lloras Por Mi	Manny Manuel	Auténtico	1996	
Ya Estoy Curao	Ramón Orlando	Ya Estoy Curao - Single	2018	
Yo Compro esa Mujer	Ramón Orlando	Bryant	1999	
Yo No Sabía	Rubby Pérez	Rubby Pérez	1989	
Yo Soy	Ramón Orlando and Milly Quezada	Generaciones	2004	
Yo Soy Tuyo	Ramón Orlando	Evolución	1997	
Yo Te Dije	Cuco Valoy	Salsa Con Coco	1978	
Yolanda	Cuco Valoy	Bien Sobao	1982	

== See also ==
- Ramón Orlando
- Ramón Orlando discography
