= Festival Presidente =

Music festival

The Festival Presidente (Presidente Festival) previously known as Festival Presidente de Música Latina (Presidente Festival of Latin Music), is a music festival in the Dominican Republic. It is one of the most important musical events in Latin America and is the largest in the Caribbean region. The festival is arranged by the Cervecería Nacional Dominicana (makers of Presidente beer) and is celebrated every two years for three days during October in the Estadio Olímpico Félix Sánchez of Santo Domingo.

== History ==
The idea of the Festival came about in 1995, when Cervecería Nacional Dominicana chose to make an event to reward the loyalty of the Dominican people towards Cerveza Presidente.

In 2007, Cervecería Nacional Dominicana cancelled the festival due to the new tax for beer sells imputed by the Dominican Government.- In 2010 The Festival came back in August, as well as in 2014. 2017 was the biggest version of the festival, held the first weekend of November at Estadio Olímpico Félix Sánchez.

== Festival Lineups ==
=== 1997 ===
==== National Artists ====
- Los Toros Band
- Los Hermanos Rosario
- Eddy Herrera
- Fernando Villalona
- Tabú Tek

==== International Artists ====
- Gilberto Santa Rosa
- Thalía
- Emanuel
- Marc Anthony
- Tito Rojas y orquesta
- Ana Bárbara
- Carlos Vives
- Enrique Iglesias
- Alejandro Fernández

=== 1998 ===
==== National Artists ====
- Los Hermanos Rosario
- Fernando Villalona
- Milly Quezada

==== International Artists ====
- Alejandro Fernández
- Maná
- Ricky Martin
- Carlos Vives
- Juan Gabriel
- Víctor Manuelle
- Jerry Rivera
- Azúcar Moreno
- Grupo Niche
- DLG

=== 1999 ===
==== National Artists ====
- Tribu del Sol
- Toño Rosario
- Fernando Villalona
- Raulín Rodríguez
- Ilegales
- Los Toros Band

==== International Artists ====
- Shakira
- Carlos Ponce
- Víctor Manuelle
- Tito Rojas
- Elvis Crespo
- Nek
- Chayanne
- Marc Anthony
- Enrique Iglesias

=== 2001 ===
==== National Artists ====
- Eddy Herrera
- Rafa Rosario
- Los Toros Band
- Hermanos Rosario
- Ciudad de Angeles
- Zacarías Ferreira
- Julio Sabala

==== International Artists ====
- Alejandro Fernández
- MDO
- Marc Anthony
- Ricardo Arjona
- Gilberto Santa Rosa
- Alejandro Sanz
- Maná
- Azul Azul

=== 2003 ===
==== National Artists ====
- Ilegales
- Milly Quezada
- Monchy y Alexandra
- Aventura
- Sergio Vargas

==== International Artists ====
- Rosario
- Bacilos
- Juanes
- Ricardo Montaner
- La Ley
- Ricardo Arjona
- Gilberto Santa Rosa
- El Gran Combo de Puerto Rico
- Chayanne

=== 2005 ===
==== National Artists ====
- Negros
- Frank Reyes
- Eddy Herrera
- Sergio Vargas
- Krispy
- Rubby Perez
- Rafa Rosario
- Hector Acosta "El torito"

==== International Artists ====
- Diego Torres
- Marc Anthony
- Julieta Venegas
- David Bisbal
- Chayanne
- Daddy Yankee
- Franco De Vita
- Jennifer López

=== 2010 ===
==== National Artists ====
- Omega
- Pavel Núñez
- Anthony Wood
- Martha Heredia
- Milly Quezada
- Wason Brazobán
- Juan Luis Guerra
- Fernando Villalona
- Sergio Vargas
- Eddy Herrera
- Toque Profundo
- Marte o Venus
- Bocatabú
- Aljadaqui
- Luis Vargas
- Luis Miguel del Amargue
- Luis Segura
- Tito Swing
- El Cata
- Los Pepe (Doble T y El Crok)
- Maridalia Hernández
- Joseito Mateo

==== International Artists ====
- Juanes
- Don Omar
- Luis Enrique
- Tito El Bambino
- Camila
- Wisin & Yandel
- Gilberto Santa Rosa
- Luis Fonsi
- T-Pain
- 50 Cent
- Jowell y Randy
- Cosculluela
- De La Ghetto
- Franco El Gorila
- Tico El Inmigrante
- Jadiel
- Pitbull

=== 2014 ===
==== National Artists ====
- Don Miguelo
- Vakeró
- Mozart La Para
- Alex Matos
- Chiquito Team Band
- Miriam Cruz
- Hector Acosta
- Anthon Santos
- Sexappeal
- Yiyo Sarante

==== International Artists ====
- Bruno Mars
- Calle 13
- Tiësto
- Duck Sauce
- Prince Royce
- Daddy Yankee
- Maná
- Wisin y Yandel
- Gilberto Santa Rosa
- Victor Manuel

=== 2017 ===
==== Friday, Nov 3 ====
- Enrique Iglesias
- Marc Anthony
- Maluma
- Ozuna
- Bad Bunny
- Bryant Myers
- Gabriel
- Lapiz Conciente
- El Alfa

==== Saturday, Nov 4 ====
- Justin Timberlake
- Zion y Lennox
- Chiquito Team Band
- Revolucion Salsera
- Wisin
- Carlos Vives
- Nicky Jam

==== Sunday, Nov 5 ====
- J Balvin
- Farruko
- Mozart La Para
- Ricky Martin
- El Mayor Clasico
- Juan Luis Guerra
- Milly Quezada
- Jowell y Randy
- Johnny Ventura
