= Ramón Orlando discography =

- Studio albums: 24
- Live albums: 1
- Compilation albums: 10
- Singles: 6
- Guest singles: 3

This is a listing of official releases by Ramón Orlando, a Dominican musician, pianist, arranger, producer, and singer.

== Albums ==
=== Studio albums ===
Title	Album details	Notes	Track listing
Homenaje A Pedro Reinoso – Instrumental De Merengue (also Merengues Instrumentales)	Released: 1977; Label: Virtuosos; Format: LP	Instrumental album	Track list: 1. Me Quiero Casar; 2. San Francisco; 3. La Cruz de Oro; 4. Llorar de Amores; 5. Emilio Mi Colega; 6. Santa Rosa; 7. Levántate Temprano; 8. Muchachita Linda; 9. Juanita Morel; 10. El Pichoncito
Orquesta Internacional; Ramon Orlando y su Orquesta Internacional (also released as Weo! with reordering)	Released: 1986; Label: Sonotone-Latin Records; Format: LP, Cassette		Track list: 1. De Que Me Sirvio Quererte; 2. Weo; 3. Pena; 4. Un Dia Mas; 5. Te Juro Que Te Quiero; 6. Tu Mujer; 7. Loco De Amor; 8. Nada, Nada; 9. Cabecita Loca; 10. Pronto Amor
Diciembre Party; Ramon Orlando y Orquesta Internacional (also Fiesta Party)	Released: 1987 (LP), 1988 (CD, Cassette); Label: Doresa, Kubaney / Discorona, Evesol (Venezuela), Sonolux (Colombia); Format: LP, CD, Cassette		Track list: 1. Diciembre Party; 2. No Me Importa, No; 3. Lápiz; 4. Bailando; 5. Dance To The Rhythm (A Gozar); 6. Como Tú; 7. Mi Sueño; 8. Mira Mis Ojos; 9. Cigarro y Vino; 10. Monotonía
Ring…Ring; Ramon Orlando y Orquesta Internacional	Released: 1989; Label: Fuga; Format: LP, CD		Track list: 1. No Hay Nadie Más; 2. Gotas de Pena; 3. Cúrame; 4. Toma y Toma; 5. Rondando Tu Esquina; 6. El Silencio, Tú y Yo; 7. Noche Eterna; 8. Risas; 9. Mama Mía; 10. Ring... Ring
Ramon Orlando presenta: Feny & Diomedes – Juntos	Released: 1990; Label: Fuga; Format: LP		Track list: 1. Bomba Caram Bomba; 2. Chiquita; 3. Solo Tú; 4. Mi Locura; 5. Hecha Para Mi; 6. Más; 7. Bon, Bon, Bon; 8. Catalino el Dichoso; 9. Fiesta; 10. Cómo Negarlo
Solo / El Hijo De La Mazurca	Released: 1990; Label: Fuga; Format: LP (Solo), 2xLP (El Hijo), (Note: El Hijo De La Mazurca is a double LP where the first LP is the equivalent of Solo (1990)) CD		1st LP: Track list: 1. Mil Maneras (El Maestro); 2. Este Amor; 3. Dos Extraños Locos; 4. Balada de Amor; 5. The King; 6. Voy; 7. Amándote Como Te Amo; 8. Nupcias; 9. Un Ratito Más; 10. Claudia; 2nd LP: Track list: 1. Son Maco; 2. Para Olvidarte; 3. Gitana; 4. Dime Tú; 5. Solo Una Noche; 6. Guaracha; 7. Vivo Llorando; 8. Nueva York No Duerme; 9. Quererte Es Mi Verdad; 10. La Fea
Mil Maneras; Ramon Orlando y su Orquesta Internacional	Released: 1991; Label: Kiridis (Spain); Format: LP		Track list: 1. No Hay Nadie Mas; 2. Nueva York No Duerme; 3. Mil Maneras; 4. Mas; 5. Vivo Llorando; 6. Caña Brava; 7. Voy; 8. Para Olvidarte
Ganar (also Solo Ganar)	Released: 1991; Label: Fuga; Format: CD		Track list: 1. Estas Lágrimas (Ganar); 2. Quiero de Ti; 3. Que Venga; 4. Quiéreme Ahora; 5. Lléname de Amor; 6. Será Hoy; 7. Fiel; 8. Eres; 9. Falta de Amor; 10. Déjame Intentarlo
Todos! Ramon Orlando y su Orquesta Internacional	Released: 1992; Label: J&N; Format: CD		Track list: 1. Mitad Inglés, Mitad Español; 2. Me Mata la Pena; 3. Te Amo; 4. Ni Te Vas Ni Me Dejas; 5. Noche y Rumba; 6. Me la Voy a Llevar; 7. Soy Tu León; 8. Cómo Podré; 9. Andante, Andante; 10. En la Boca de los Tiburones
America Sin Quejas {also released as El Maestro (1994))	Released: 1993; Label: Karen (Venezuela, US, Spain, Colombia); format: LP, CD, Cassette		Track list: 1. América Sin Queja; 2. Esto Fue lo Que Ví; 3. Tonto Corazón; 4. Sin las Dos; 5. Por Él; 6. Un Día; 7. El Bufón; 8. Es Tuya; 9. Te Compro Tu Novia; 10. A la Mala; 11. Cúrame; 12. Te Espero; 13. Que Venga; 14. Mamá; 15. Dile Que Se Aguante; 16. América Sin Queja II
Evolución	Released: 1997; Label: Karen (US, Spain); Format: CD		Track list: 1. No Voy a Volver a Llorar; 2. Que Tiene Él; 3. El Amor de Mi Vida; 4. Rica Boca; 5. Sombrero; 6. Ula Ula; 7. Stress; 8. Yo Soy Tuyo; 9. Tendré; 10. Dueño, Amo y Señor; 11. Cuánto Se Llora; 12. Mi Novia Viuda; 13. Corazón Barato; 14. Hay Amores; 15. El Venao
Cronicas	Released: 2000; Label: Fuga; Format: CD		Track list: 1. Nadie Se Muere de Amor; 2. Acuyuyé; 3. Mi Cama No Habla; 4. Crónicas; 5. Vuelve; 6. Ahora Que Estamos Solos; 7. La Cosa Más Bella; 8. Vuela; 9. Don Nadie; 10. Vas a Volver
Con el Corazón Atao	Released: 2000; Label: Sony Discos; Format: CD		Track list: 1. Yo Compro Esa Mujer; 2. No Me Sirve de Nada; 3. Quiereme Mucho / Por Un Poco de Tu Amor; 4. Si No Te Puedo Amar / El Día de Mi Suerte; 5. Nada Sin Ti; 6. Que Será lo Que Pelea; 7. Te Quiero de Veras; 8. Corazón Atado; 9. Te Voy a Hacer Un Bolero; 10. Malas Palabras; 11. Te Quiero de Veras (Pop)
El Tiki Tiki del Amor	Released: 2002; Label: Mr. Imperio (US); Format: CD		Track list: 1. Se Acaba el Amor; 2. Corazón de Cristal; 3. Fruta Fina; 4. Ella; 5. Loco, Loco; 6. Acuyuyé; 7. El Tiki Tiki del Amor; 8. Ahora Que Estamos Solos; 9. Vas a Matarme; 10. Pa' Todo el Año; 11. Don Nadie
Disfraces	Released: 2003; Label: Fuga; Format: CD		Track list: 1. Tililin; 2. El Lobo; 3. Magdalena; 4. Solo Para Ti; 5. Ven y Dancea; 6. Yo Deseando; 7. Estatua de Sal; 8. Te Quiero, Te Quiero; 9. Ni Una Noche Más; 10. Te Quiero, Te Extraño; 11. Al Pan, Pan; 12. Fue Culpa Tuya; 13. Mi Sueño; 14. Tililin (Pop)
Generaciones	Released: 24 August 2004; Label: J&N, Sony; Format: CD	Nominated: Best Merengue Album, 6th Annual Latin Grammy Awards	Track list: 1. Yo Soy; 2. La Gran Ciudad; 3. Ileal; 4. A Toda Hora; 5. Palabras del Alma; 6. Lo Quieras o No; 7. Los Tres Besos; 8. Cien Mil Razones; 9. Doce Rosas; 10. Dime Tan Solo; 11. Nadie Como Tú; 12. ¡Que Bolero!
En Tierra Ajena	Released: 22 November 2006; Label: Tu; Format: CD		Track list: 1. La Novela; 2. No Eres Una Más; 3. El Olor de Tu Sudor; 4. Culpable o No; 5. Golozéamela; 6. El Perro Ajeno; 7. Luna Llena; 8. Para Amarlo; 9. Torpe Corazón; 10. Media Vida
El Duro	Released: 9 October 2007; Label: Kubaney, Umgd, Craft; Format: CD		Track list: 1. Me Mata la Pena; 2. Las Esquinas (Popurrí): Las Esquinas Son / Josefa Matia / Son Maco / La Mora; 3. Cantando Se Fue; 4. Nueva York No Duerme; 5. Sisi y Ricardo; 6. No Me Importa, No; 7. Esa Negra; 8. Al Que le Debo Que Se Aguante; 9. Cigarro y Vino; 10. Como Tú; 11. Preciosa Mujer; 12. Amor Para Mi; 13. Mira Mis Ojos; 14. Diciembre Party
Fiesta en el Cielo	Released: 28 November 2014; Label: Format:		Track list: 1. Fiesta en el Cielo; 2. Hay Más; 3. Celebrar; 4. Yo Soy Tu Dios; 5. Yo Tengo Un Teléfono; 6. Tu Palabra; 7. Yo Creo; 8. Victoria; 9. Fuego en el Templo; 10. Me Sacudo
Adoración en el Trono	Released: 3 December 2014; Label: Format:		Track list: 1. Hasta Que Llegue Jesús; 2. El Que No Tiene a Jesús; 3. Él Me Sanó; 4. Hagamos Una Fiesta; 5. Alguien Llora Hoy; 6. Te Amo Con Mi Vida; 7. Necesidad; 8. Te Amé; 9. Ay de Mi; 10. A Tu Trono; 11. En la Cruz; 12. Mi Sanador
Special Edition, Merengue, Jazz, y un Poco Más	Released: 2021; Label: Fuga, Tu; Format: stream		

=== Compilation albums ===
Title	Album details	Notes	Track listing
Éxitos Engavetados	Released: 1989; Label: Format:		Track list: 1. Cometa Blanca; 2. Si Tu Piensas Que No Te Amo; 3. Las Esquinas; 4. Caña Brava; 5. Como Te Atreves; 6. Al Que le Debo Que Se Aguante; 7. Pegaditos; 8. Plazos Traicioneros; 9. Sabrás; 10. Cuando Tu No Estás
Los Grandes Éxitos del Maestro	Released: 1993; Label: Kubaney; Format: CD		Track list: 1. Weo; 2. Me Mata la Pena; 3. Tu Mujer; 4. Diciembre Party; 5. Cigarro y Vino; 6. Nueva York No Duerme; 7. Toma y Toma; 8. Mi Locura; 9. Sisi y Ricardo; 10. No Me Importa, No
Con Sus 16 Éxitos	Released: 1993; Label: J&N; Format: CD		Track list: 1. No Hay Nadie Más; 2. Toma y Toma; 3. Ring... Ring; 4. Mil Maneras; 5. La Fea; 6. Son Maco; 7. Me Mata la Pena; 8. Soy Tu León; 9. Bomba Caram Bomba; 10. Más; 11. Hecha Para Mi; 12. Rondando Tu Esquina; 13. Gotas de Pena; 14. Noche y Rumba; 15. Bailando; 16. Esa Paloma
Clásicos Para Enamorados	Released: 1997; Label: Format:		Track list: 1. Te Extraño; 2. Ay Amor; 3. Deja de Llorar; 4. Si Supieras; 5. Que Quieres Tú de Mi; 6. Cuando Te Entregue Mi Amor; 7. Si Tu Piensas Que No Te Amo; 8. Yo Me Voy; 9. Hay Algo en Ella; 10. Sabrás
El Disco de Oro	Released: 1997; Label: Kubaney; Format: CD		Vol. 1 Track list: 1. Diciembre Party; 2. Weo; 3. Cigarro y Vino; 4. Me Mata la Pena; 5. Juanita Morel; 6. Monotonía; 7. Pa' Gozar Contigo; 8. Me Quiero Casar; 9. Como Tú; 10. Cantando Se Fue; 11. San Francisco; 12. Dance to the Rhythm (A Gozar); 13. Preciosa Mujer; 14. Mira Mis Ojos; 15. Esa Negra; Vol. 2 Track list: 1. Nueva York No Duerme; 2. Toma y Toma; 3. Amor Para Mí; 4. No Me Importa, No; 5. Tu Mujer; 6. El Pichoncito; 7. El Aborto; 8. Bailando; 9. Mi Locura; 10. Muchachita Linda; 11. Me Olvidé de Ti; 12. Lápiz; 13. Nació Varón; 14. Levántate Temprano; 15. Mi Sueño
Mi Historia Musical	Released: 2000; Label: Format: CD		Track list: 1. Cigarro y Vino; 2. Me Mata la Pena; 3. Que Venga; 4. No Hay Nadie Más; 5. Nueva York No Duerme; 6. Rondando Tu Esquina; 7. Ring... Ring; 8. Bailando; 9. Mil Maneras; 10. Bomba Caram Bomba; 11. La Fea; 12. Noche Eterna; 13. Son Maco; 14. Mi Sueño; 15. Soy Tu León
Éxitos de los Cantantes de Ramón Orlando	Released: 8 February 2000; Label: Monito; Format: CD		Track list: 1. El Venao; 2. El Virao; 3. El Camisón; 4. Es lo Que Pide; 5. El Chivo; 6. Tu Mujer; 7. Bomba Caram Bomba; 8. Más; 9. Bon, Bon, Bon; 10. Cúrame; 11. Como Tú; 12. Quédate Amor
En Baladas y Boleros: Los Mejores 15 Éxitos del Maestro	Released: 2000; Label: Format:		Track list: 1. Mil Maneras; 2. Que Venga; 3. Balada de Amor; 4. Amándote Como Te Amo; 5. Estas Lágrimas; 6. Nupcias; 7. Un Ratito Más; 8. Te Juro Que Te Quiero; 9. Rondando Tu Esquina; 10. Este Amor; 11. Quiéreme Ahora; 12. Será Hoy; 13. Dos Extraños Locos; 14. Fiel; 15. Voy
Solo Bachatas Para Ti	Released: 2001; Label: Format:		Track list: 1. Noche Eterna; 2. Cabecita Loca; 3. Bailando; 4. Pronto Amor; 5. Diciembre Party; 6. No Hay Nadie Más; 7. Que Quieres Tú de Mi; 8. Sabrás; 9. Loco, Loco (ft. Antony Santos); 10. Rondando Tu Esquina; 11. Cigarro y Vino; 12. De Que Me Sirvió Quererte; 13. Pena
20 Éxitos	Released: 30 July 2002; Label: J&N; Format:		Vol. 1: Track list: 1. Me Mata la Pena; 2. Bailando; 3. Mitad Inglés, Mitad Español; 4. Que Venga; 5. Soy Tu León; 6. El Silencio, Tú y Yo; 7. Te Amo; 8. Esa Paloma; 9. Gotas de Pena; 10. Más; Vol. 2: Track list: 1. Solo Una Noche; 2. Mil Maneras; 3. Toma y Toma; 4. Ring... Ring; 5. Nueva York No Duerme; 6. No Hay Nadie Más; 7. Rondando Tu Esquina; 8. Son Maco; 9. La Fea; 10. Hecha Para Mi
2 Grandes del Merengue Vol. 3 (with Alex Bueno)	Released: 23 September 2008; Label: J&N; Format:	Odd tracks by Bueno, even tracks by Orlando	Track list: 1. Que Cara Más Bonita; 2. Ring... Ring; 3. Como a Nadie; 4. No Hay Nadie Más; 5. Colegiala; 6. Bailando; 7. Amores Que Matan; 8. Toma y Toma; 9. Una Paloma Blanca; 10. Los Tres Besos; 11. Los Caminos de la Vida; 12. Hecha Para Mi; 13. Otro Weekend Sin Ti; 14. Gotas de Pena; 15. Corazón de Madera; 16. Más
1	Released: 2015; Label: J&N Records; Format: stream		
Éxitos Escasos	Released: 2021; Label: Fuga, Tu; Format: stream		
Pistas Originales	Released: 2022; Label: Fuga, Tu; Format: stream		
Pistas Originales de Balada	Released: 2022; Label: Fuga, Tu; Format: stream	Instrumentals	

=== Live albums ===
Title	Album details	Notes	Track listing
En Concierto Desde el Palacio de Bellas Artes	Released: 1989; Label: Format:		Track list: 1. Introducción Estudio de Czerny; 2. hay lola 3. Homenaje a Oscar Peterson; 4. Jazz Sublime; 5. Jazz a lo Maco (Who's Play); 6. Salón México Danzón; 7. Juliana; 8. Afinación / Nueva York No Duerme; 9. Mi Locura; 10. Más; 11. Esa Paloma; 12. Te Juro Que Te Quiero; 13. Balada de Amor; 14. Este Amor

== Singles ==
=== As main artist ===
Name	Release date
Cuidado con Enfermarse	2021
La Flaca featuring Angely	2021
Los Amores de Marcela	2021
Piano Desafiante	2021
Me Deguañango featuring Los Cantantes and Mozart La Para	2022
Perdidos featuring Raquel Arias	2022

=== As guest artist ===
Name	Release date
Latidos de Tambor with Luys Bien	2022
15,500 Noches with Romeo Santos featuring Rubby Perez, Toño Rosario and Fernando Villalona.	2022
Celebrando with Mr. Gari	2022

== See also ==
- List of songs written by Ramón Orlando
