= Manoguayabo, Santo Domingo =

Sector of Santo Domingo, Dominican Republic

Coordinates: 18.482662°N 70.000291°W

Manoguayabo is a small sector of Santo Domingo in the Dominican Republic. It is mainly populated by the lower class, and has a large Haitian migrant population. It is one of the poorest sectors around the Santo Domingo area.

The sector is best known as the birthplace of composers Cuco Valoy, Ramón Orlando and Cheché Abreu; plus Major League Baseball pitcher, Pedro Martínez, who has contributed to the area building churches, schools and a baseball field.

== See also ==
- Palavé
