= Ramón Orlando =

Dominican singer (born 1959)

- Born: Ramón Orlando Valoy García; 29 July 1959 (age 67); Santo Domingo, Dominican Republic
- Genres: Latin; Salsa music; Son montuno; Bachata; Merengue; Bolero; Guaracha
- Occupations: Musician; Singer; Composer; Arranger; Record producer; Songwriter
- Instruments: Vocals; Keyboards; Piano

Ramón Orlando Valoy García (born 29 July 1959), is a Dominican musician, singer, arranger, composer, record producer and songwriter, besides being a gran maestro pianist in Caribbean rhythms. Ramón Orlando received seven Casandra awards in the 1992 ceremony, including the Soberano, which is the most important category in the Dominican awards ceremony. In 2005, he was nominated for the Latin Grammy Award in the Best Merengue Album category.

== Career ==
Ramón Orlando Valoy was born on 29 July 1959, in Santo Domingo, Dominican Republic. He is the son of Cuco Valoy.

Ramón Orlando started his music career at age 14, as a singer, piano player, arranger, composer and songwriter in his father's merengue band called La Tribu. He formed his own merengue music band in 1984 called "Los Virtuosos", later renamed “Cuco Valoy y Orquesta” with Peter Cruz y Henry García as lead singers.

Years later, the Cuco Valoy group broke up. Ramón Orlando then undertook a more ambitious musical project. He and then-famous merengue singers Peter Cruz and Henry García formed La Orquesta Internacional (The International Orchestra), in which Ramón Orlando intended to be the composer and musical director, while Cruz and García were intended to be the vocalists. However, of the first ten "single" songs to be recorded (and released individually), Ramón chose to sing four of them himself, which caused a split in the group. Peter Cruz and Henry García then each formed a short-lived group. Upon the two vocalists' departure, Ramón Orlando quickly hired some vocalists with voices sounding similar to those of Cruz and García in order to perform songs already gaining airplay.

Ramón Orlando is also the composer of the theme El venao, which found a large audience in several Latin American countries including Colombia, Venezuela and Puerto Rico. Ramón Orlando shares with Juan Luis Guerra the greatest Soberano Award in 1992. He was a nominee in the Latin Grammy Awards of 2005 for the Best Merengue Album (Generaciones) in the tropical category.

Ramón Orlando serves as a pastor in a Protestant church.

== Awards ==
Ramón Orlando received in 1992 the highest award given by Soberano Awards; that year he received 7 awards, for which Ramón Orlando holds the record of receiving the most Soberano Awards in a ceremony. In 2005, he was nominated to the 6th Annual Latin Grammy Awards as Best Merengue Album with Generaciones.

== Arrangements ==
Ramon Orlando is a prolific arranger of latin music including merengue, salsa, bachata and ballads. During his ongoing career, he has completed more than 2,000 arrangements for his band, for Los Virtuosos, La Tribu, Los Cantantes, Cuco Valoy, and for other artists including Alberto Beltrán, Fernando Villalona, Alex Bueno, Milly Quezada, Rubby Pérez, Wilfrido Vargas, Luys Bien, Miriam Cruz, Manny Manuel, among others.

The following are some of well-known or recent arrangements by Ramón Orlando:

Song title	Lyricist(s)	Artist(s)	Release	Year released
15,500 Noches	Romeo Santos	Romeo Santos Featuring Rubby Pérez, Toño Rosario and Fernando Villalona, and Ramón Orlando	Fórmula Vol. 3	2022
Latidos de Tambor	Cristino Gómez	Ramón Orlando and Luys Bien	Latidos de Tambor - Single	2022
Perdidos	Ramón Orlando	Ramón Orlando and Raquel Arias	Perdidos - Single	2022
Creíste	Ramón Orlando	Antony Santos	Creíste - Single	2013
El Perro Ajeno	Ramón Orlando	Rubby Pérez	Tonto Corazón	2004
Yo Soy	Ramón Orlando	Ramón Orlando and Milly Quezada	Generaciones	2004
Meneando La Cola	Ramón Orlando	ULS (Lead vocals by Sexappeal)	United Latin for Salsa	2000
Maniquí	Ramón Orlando	Manny Manuel	Rey De Corazones	1995
El Venano	Ramón Orlando	Los Cantantes de Ramón Orlando	El Virao	1995
La Loba	Ramón Orlando	Miriam y las Chicas	Nueva Vida	1993
De Qué Me Sirvió Quererte	Reynaldo Armas	Ramón Orlando y su Orquesta Internacional	Orquesta Internacional	1986
Volveré	Ignacio Roman Jimenez and Francisco Lopez Cepero Garcia	Wilfrido Vargas (Lead vocals by Rubby Pérez)	La Medicina "Wilfrido 86"	1985
Cometa Blanca	Ignacio Roman Jimenez and Francisco Lopez Cepero Garcia	Peter Cruz	Orquesta Internacional	1985
Si Piensas Que No Te Amo	Benny Goran Bror Andersson, Bjoern K Ulvaeus and Stig Erik Leopold Anderson	Ramón Orlando	La Tribu de Cuco Valoy	1984
Sé Que Te Perdí	Mauricio Cardozo	Fernandito	Fernandito	1984
Te Extraño	Ramón Orlando	Cuco Valoy y La Tribu	Qué Será Lo Que Quiere El Negro?	1983
Frutos del Carnaval	Cuco Valoy	Cuco Valoy & Los Virtuosos	Sin Comentarios...	1981
Juliana	Cuco Valoy	Cuco Valoy	Salsa Con Coco	1978

== See also ==
- List of songs written by Ramón Orlando
