= Antena 21 =

Television station in the Dominican Republic

- Country: Dominican Republic
- Broadcast area: Santo Domingo
- Network: Trendy S.A.S
- Headquarters: Santo Domingo, Dominican Republic

Programming
- Language: Spanish
- Picture format: HDTV 1080p

Ownership
- Owner: Albavisión
- Sister channels: Antena 7 Antena 55 SUR

History
- Launched: 13 August 1991
- Former names: Veintiuno (2007-2017)

Links
- Website: https://www.antena7.com.do/

Availability

Terrestrial
- Analog UHF: Channel 21 UHF
- Digital VHF/UHF: Channel 7.2; Channel 21.1

Antena 21 is a Spanish-language broadcast television station in Santo Domingo, Dominican Republic on UHF channel 21. It's owned by Albavisión, through a figurehead company registered in the British Virgin Islands. The station currently airs general entertainment programming.

== History ==
The station has its origins in Puerto Plata, when Camilo Carrau Villanueva applied for a UHF license on channel 31, receiving approval from Indotel on December 21, 1994. Santo Domingo was part of the coverage area. By 1998, it was renamed Teleisla. The station was renamed Antena 21 in the early 2000s.

In 2014, the channel secured the rights to carry the Dominican Republic team matches for Centrobasket and the 2014 FIBA Basketball World Cup.

Beginning in 2015, the station was put under indirect control of Antena 7, being owned by a separate figurehead company, Trendy S.A.S., making it a part of the Albavisión conglomerate.
