= Raulín Rosendo =

Dominican salsa singer (born 1957)

- Born: Raulín Amado Martínez; August 30, 1957 (age 69); Villa Duarte, Dominican Republic
- Genre: Salsa
- Occupation: Singer
- Years active: Since 1969

Raulín Rosendo (born August 30, 1957) is a Dominican salsa singer.

== Career ==
Steeped in the rhythms of Afro-Antilles music throughout his childhood, he began his performing career at the age of 12 as a member of the merengue group El Chivo y Su Banda, later appearing with acts including Fernando Villalona, Conjunto Clásico and Los Vecinos. Known as “The Angry Sonero”, Rosendo made his solo debut with 1991's Salsa, Solamente Salsa; by 1993 he was recording in New York City with producer Ricky Gonzalez, scoring the hits Amor en Secreto & Santo Domingo.

Different projects kept Rosendo resurging with success, but in 1995 his record "El Sonero que el Pueblo Prefiere" became the most sold album of the year and, in it was the song "Uno se cura" one of Raulins greatest hits. He was nominated for a Cassandra Award and an A.C.E. Award in New York. The subsequent success of albums including ¡Lo Maximo!, 1996's Dominicano Para el Mundo, 1997's ¡Simplemente! ¡Contrólate! & 1998's Llegó la Ley established him among the biggest salsa performers of the period. Donde Me Coja la Noche followed in 1999.

== Discography & videography ==
=== Albums ===
- 1988: Salsa Con Amor
- 1991: Salsa, Solamente Salsa
- 1991: Mamá Vieja
- 1992: ¡Que Se Cuiden Los Soneros!
- 1992: El Salsero Del Pueblo
- 1993: ¡Lo Máximo!: El Sonero Del Pueblo
- 1995: El Sonero Que El Pueblo Prefiere
- 1996: Dominicano Para El Mundo
- 1997: ¡Simplemente! ¡Contrólate!
- 1998: Llegó La Ley
- 1999: Donde Me Coja La Noche
- 2001: En Venezuela
- 2002: De Aquí Pa' Allá
- 2003: La Fama Es Peligrosa
- 2006: Dame Otra Oportunidad
- 2021: Tranquilo Que Yo Controlo

=== Box set/compilation ===
- 1997: El Disco De Oro
- 1999: Non Stop Doble Éxitos '99
- 2002: Historia De Éxitos
- 2015: Joya De Quisqueya

=== Videos ===
- 1997: ¡Simplemente! ¡Contrólate! [Video]
- 1997: El Sonero Que El Pueblo Prefiere [Video]
- 1997: Dominicano Para El Mundo [Video]
- 2004: Lo Mejor De Lo Mejor
- 2020: No Saben Nada

== See also ==
- List of people from the Dominican Republic
