= Antena 7 =

Spanish national public television network

- Country: Dominican Republic
- Broadcast area: National
- Headquarters: Santo Domingo, Dominican Republic

Programming
- Language: Spanish
- Picture format: 1080p HDTV

Ownership
- Owner: Interamerica Broadcasting & Production Company S.A. Albavisión
- Sister channels: Antena 21

History
- Founded: 21-April-1999 Beginning of test transmissions
- Launched: October 16, 1999 (26 years ago)
- Former names: Rahintel (1959-1999); Antena Latina (1999–2016)

Links
- Website: https://www.antena7.com.do/

Availability

Terrestrial
- Analog VHF: Channel 7 VHF
- Digital VHF/UHF: Channel 7.1

Antena 7 (formerly known as Antena Latina) is a television network in the Dominican Republic owned and operated by Albavision, it is headquartered in Santo Domingo. It began to broadcast on October 16, 1999 after the shutdown of the former RAHINTEL.

== History ==
In 1999, Radio HIN Televisión (Rahintel) was in apparent decline, after years surviving without new programs and without the support of its parent company, Grupo Financiero Universal, which had gone bankrupt in the late 1980s. The animated series, which had been the last higher-class programs with high audience in Rahintel, had been withdrawn.

Due to the entire situation, Rahintel was put up for sale in 1999, being the Bonetti Group who decided to purchase channel 7. After the financial operation was completed, Rahintel quietly left the air in April 1999.

From then on, channel 7 was partially closed and with provisional programming that announced the arrival of a new channel 7, which was announced in the summer of 1999 as Antena Latina. After months of intense promotion, in which a younger approach was noted for channel 7, Antena Latina was put on air on October 16, 1999. Before the formal launch of the network, it broadcast a boxing match between Oscar de la Hoya and Félix Trindad, as well as signing an agreement with CNN.

The arrival of Antena Latina introduced new technologies to Dominican television, such as the complement of the first and only virtual studio in the Caribbean area, a breakthrough for those times. In addition, its programming contained programs that gave the channel a large audience. One of the most successful programs were WWE wrestling, which was broadcast again in the country after several years of absence.

Over the years, Antena Latina has strengthened itself as a premium channel in local production. This was evidenced by productions such as El bachatón (produced by Alfonso Rodríguez), and later, in productions such as Noche de luz, Focus, Grandiosa, Rica Loquera, among many others. Operated by Albavision Antena 21 was born in 2002 with a television format which combines design and technology to provide a quality programmer for its television audience. Publishing the latest news from the Dominican Republic.

In 2012, Daniel Sarcos entered the channel, with his program Aqui se Habla Español.

In 2014, the departure of the SIN Group was announced after the acquisition made by Albavisión, acquiring the shares of Antena Latina (today Antena 7) for 47.5% after the Bonetti Group sold through Albavision due to the restructuring process. Later it also acquired Antena 21's license.

In 2016 the channel slightly changed the logo and the graphic line, changing its name to Antena 7, as well as a new slogan: Llegando a ti (Coming to you). The current logo is a deviation of the previous one, adding a blue 7, alluding to the national colors.

On January 19, 2025, Indotel warned Antena 7 and Antena 21, giving the channels a 30-day period to be sold to Dominican businessmen.
