= Cristino Gómez =

Dominican Republic poet (born 1987)

Cristino Alberto Gómez Luciano
- Born: Cristino Alberto Gómez Luciano; 24 July 1987; Loma de Cabrera, Dominican Republic
- Education: CATIE; EARTH University; Instituto Politécnico Loyola
- Occupations: Poet, writer, agronomist, professor
- Parent(s): Luis Gómez, Marys Luciano
- Writing career
- Genre: Poetry
- Notable works: Ha vuelto el agua Quítame las horas
- Notable awards: Premio de Poesía Biblioteca W.K. Kellog 2007 for "Ha vuelto el agua" Blog Distinguido de la Literatura Dominicana, Feria Internacional del Libro Santo Domingo 2008
- Website: www.mipoeta.com

Cristino Alberto Gómez Luciano (born 1987) is a Dominican author, poet, agronomist, professor.

== Early life ==
Cristino Gómez grew up in Fondo Grande, a community in the municipality Loma de Cabrera of Dominican Republic. He started to write poetry early, initially motivated by the work of the Dominican poet Manuel Rueda.

== Work and Trajectory ==
Cristino's verses, inspired on nature, homeland, and the beloved, "invite to appreciate beauty" and introduce "love symbolized in nature".

His poems have been published both printed and online, including blogs, magazines, newspapers and literary webs. Some of his writings are included in poetry anthologies, including Mil Poemas a Neruda, in tribute to Chilean Nobel laureate poet Pablo Neruda, and the Antología del Poeta y Artista Virtual. In 2007 he was awarded the W.K. Kellog award of poetry of EARTH University, and, in 2008, his blog was honored as Distinguished Dominican Literary Blog at the International Book Fair of Santo Domingo. Currently, Cristino is teacher and the coordinator of the School of Agronomy of the Instituto Politécnico Loyola, and professor at the Instituto Especializado de Estudios Superiores Loyola. In December 2020, Luys Bien released Firme Albor, an EP of five songs based on poems written by Cristino Gómez. Later, in 2021, the singer also released two singles, Aún Te Amo and Déjame Nacer, written by Gómez Luciano.

== Publications ==
=== Poetry ===
- Cristino Alberto Gómez (18 August 2024). Dijiste que volvías. ISBN 979-8336580150. (2024)
- Cristino Alberto Gómez (18 October 2021). Yo dije el amor. ISBN 978-9945166545. (2014)
- Cristino Alberto Gómez (4 March 2010). Ha vuelto el agua. ISBN 978-0557320455. (2010)
- Cristino Alberto Gómez. Quítame las horas. ISBN 978-0557396542. (2010)
- Cristino Alberto Gómez. Sudores de cafetal. ISBN 978-0557464265. (2010)
- Cristino Alberto Gómez. Arrancado de Raíz. ISBN 978-0557678754. (2010)

=== Other ===
- Bautista-Solís, P.; Gutiérrez-Montes, I.; Aguilar, J.; Cotto, E.; Gómez, C.; González, M.; Guillén, D.; Mendoza, J.; Morales, I.; Pinoth, R.; Posada, K.; Quiñónez, G.; Salazar, A.; Salgado, M.; Steinvorth, K.; Zambrano, M. (2012). Capitales de la comunidad y la conservación de los recursos naturales: El caso del Corredor Biológico Tenorio-Miravalles. ISBN 978-9977-57-553-7.
- Nygren, P.; Leblanc, H. A.; Lu, M.; Gómez Luciano, C. A. (2012). "Distribution of coarse and fine roots of Theobroma cacao and shade tree Inga edulis in a cocoa plantation" (PDF). Annals of Forest Science. 70 (3): 229. doi:10.1007/s13595-012-0250-z. S2CID 15985489.
- Gómez L., C. -A.; Leblanc, H.; Nygren, P. (2009). "Distribución de raíces finas de Inga edulis y Theobroma cacao en el suelo de un sistema agroforestal orgánico". Tierra Tropical: Sostenibilidad, Ambiente y Sociedad. 5 (2): 141–151. ISSN 1659-2751. Archived from the original on 8 March 2014.

== Prizes ==
- Premio de Poesía Biblioteca W.K. Kellog 2007 for "Ha vuelto el agua"
- Blog Distinguido de la Literatura Dominicana at the Feria Internacional del Libro Santo Domingo 2008.
