= Loma de Cabrera =

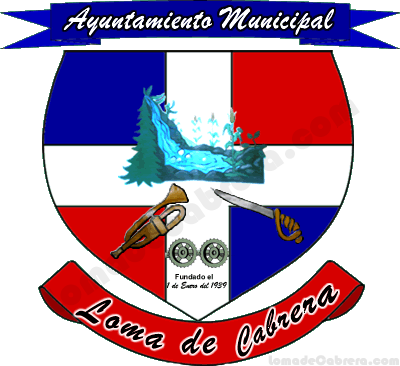
- Coat of arms

- Location within the Dominican Republic
- Coordinates: 19°26′N 71°37′W
- Country: Dominican Republic
- Province: Dajabón
- Municipality since: 1938

Area
  - Total: 238.51 km^{2} (92.09 sq mi)

Population (2012)
  - Total: 20,665
  - Density: 86.642/km^{2} (224.40/sq mi)
- Demonym: Lomacabrero(a)
- Municipalities: 2
- Climate: Am

Loma de Cabrera is the second largest city in the province of Dajabón, Dominican Republic. It is located in the northwest portion of the country, in the Cibao region.

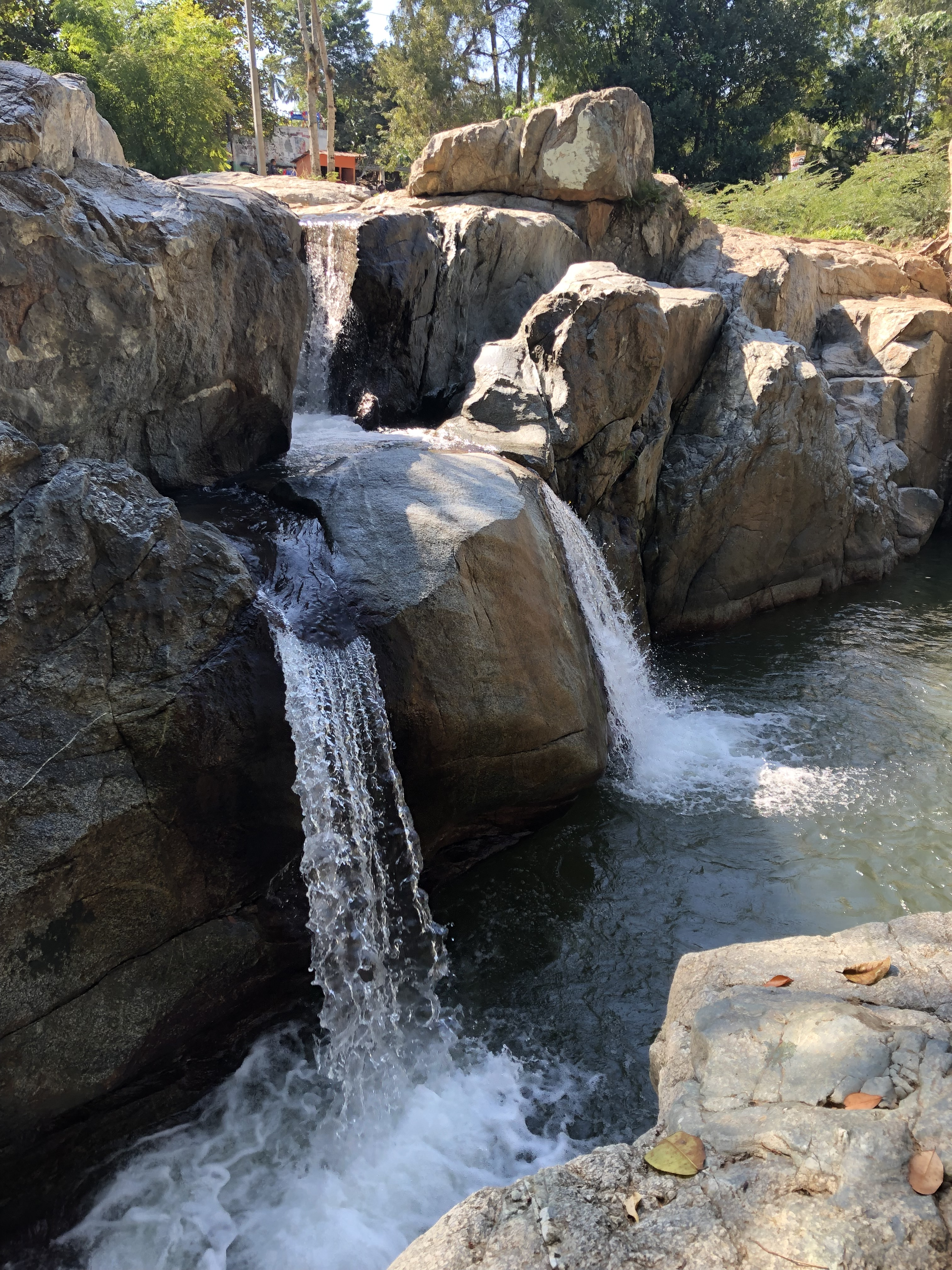
The Balneario El Salto waterfall in Loma de Cabrera

The river named Dajabón, also known as Masacre, runs through Loma de Cabrera. The same river separates the city of Dajabon from Haiti. Loma de Cabrera has a very popular river falls called "Balneario El Salto", which is a very popular tourist place for Dominican residents.

== Notable people ==
- Juan Andújar (1986) – contemporary artist
- Rafael Furcal (1977) – former professional baseball shortstop, won the 2011 World Series with the St. Louis Cardinals
- Cristino Gómez (1987) – poet, agronomist, and professor
- Julio Rodríguez (2000) – professional baseball outfielder for the Seattle Mariners
- Fernando Villalona (1955) – legendary merengue singer

== Sister cities ==
- (United States) Edgewater, New Jersey (November 16, 2020)
