= Villa Duarte =

- Location within the Dominican Republic
- Coordinates: 18°28′N 69°52′W
- Country: Dominican Republic
- Province: Santo Domingo
- Municipalities: Santo Domingo Este

Government
  - Mayor: Dío Astacio

Area
  - Total: 105.41 km^{2} (40.70 sq mi)

Population (2008)
  - Total: 151,415
  - Density: 5,981.46/km^{2} (15,491.9/sq mi)
- Time zone: -4 UTC
- Website: Archived 2009-01-07 at the Wayback Machine

Villa Duarte is a sector in the city of Santo Domingo Este in the province of Santo Domingo of the Dominican Republic. Villa Duarte was originally part of the capital city Santo Domingo, Distrito Nacional. Santo Domingo Este was created as municipality in 2001 by law 163-01, splitting the Santo Domingo province from the Distrito Nacional, with Santo Domingo Este taking the other sectors of Alma Rosa I, Alma Rosa II, El Almirante, Hainamosa, Invivienda, Lucerna, Mendoza, Ozama, Ralma, San Isidro, Sans Sousi, Urbanización Italia, and others.

== Famous residents ==
Salsa singer Raulín Rosendo was born and raised in Villa Duarte.

== Sources ==
- Santo Dominfo Este sectors
