= MioSoty =

American singer-songwriter

MIOSOTIS
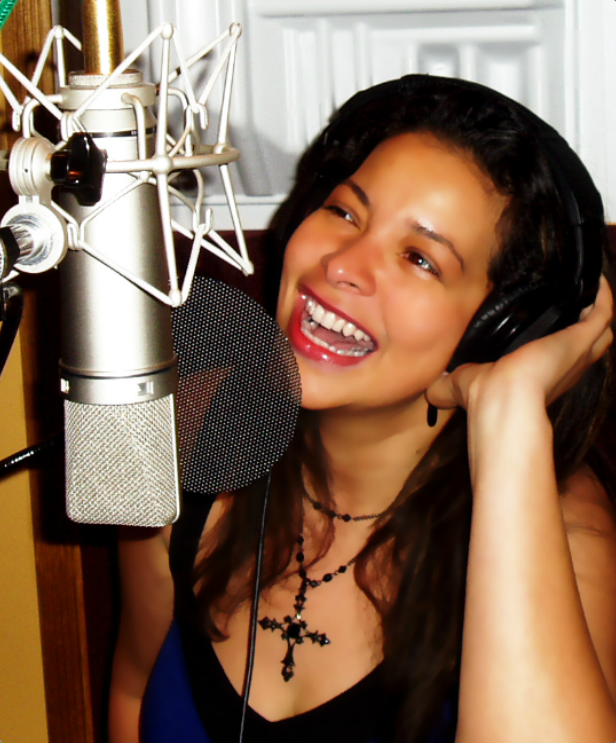

Background information
- Also known as: MIOSOTIS La Estrella de la Salsa, Miosotis La Cantante, MioSoty Songz, Miosotis Malagon, Miosoty Meza, Miosotis Mesa
- Born: Miosotis Ligia Malagon Montalvo; Brooklyn, New York City, New York, U.S.
- Genres: R&B, Merengue, Salsa, Bachata, Latin jazz, Pop
- Occupations: Singer, songwriter, dancer, actress, choreographer, television personality, music producer, television producer, model, talent agent, philanthropist, recipient of Latin Grammy (with Sergio Vargas in 2023), has Ace Awards, Soberano, Globe award, and many others.
- Instruments: Piano, guitar, conga, güiro
- Years active: 1985-present

Miosoty is an American Latin singer, dancer, songwriter, actress, choreographer, television personality, producer, and model. Her career began as a teenager, singing merengue for nearly two years with popular Dominican singer Wilfrido Vargas and five years with The New York Band. She branched off as a solo salsa singer in 1997 during the resurgence of the genre and other forms of Latin music. Although a member of the younger generation of Latin music artists, she is best known for her classic singing style.

== Background ==
MioSotis was born in Brooklyn, New York to parents of Dominican descent. She grew up listening to merengue and salsa, and her parents took her and her siblings to numerous music festivals all over New York. Among the first Latin music festivals she remembered attending as a toddler featured Wilfrido Vargas. Her father frequently woke the rest of the household on Saturday mornings by blasting a merengue song and playing along (with trumpet, maracas, güiro, or tambora).

Her family recognized her precocious talents and arranged for her to begin formal piano, vocal, and flamenco dance lessons at age five. Her diverse but solid and thorough musical training continued through college, including opera, musical theatre, gospel, and R&B. Her vocal coaches included Broadway singer/songwriter/composer /actor Jimmy Justice, Dominican lyric soprano Ivonne Haza, Dominican dramatic tenor Rafael Sanchez Cestero, and jazz pianist / vocalist Reggie Segars. Her acting instructors included Susan Rybin and Harry Gahynor.

In 1989 she was signed to producer Ralph Mercado’s RMM Records with The New York Band. Mercado introduced young listeners to new salsa artists such as Marc Anthony and La India. Five years before salsa had been considered a dead genre, but it was then experiencing not simply resurgence but an explosion of interest, among Latino and white listeners alike.

As a teen-ager MioSotis mastered a diverse range of Latin musical genres, playing cumbia, Tex-Mex, rancheras, salsa, and merengue, as well as pop, soul, dance, and R&B, sung in both Spanish and English. She began singing professionally at thirteen and performed with merengue star Wilfrido Vargas for two years. When her parents returned to Santo Domingo, Dominican Republic she worked with the Altamira Banda Show, as advised by Vargas, before returning to New York to continue her studies. She spent five years recording and touring with The New York Band, a well known salsa/merengue quartet also featuring Cherito Jiménez, Alexandra, and Johnny. (Alexandra was replaced by Maggie in 1992. Maggie was replaced by Yudith in 1994, and Johnny's replacement was Tony in 1991).

== Recording career ==
MioSotis made her live debut as a solo artist on February 26, 1995 with her five-piece R&B band at the Honeysuckle West club in New York City. She began recording and producing her first solo album, Hazme Soñar (Make me dream), while still an undergraduate student at the City University of New York (CUNY) Queens College. The eclectic debut album, released at the Radio and Música Convention in Los Angeles, California in August 1995, featured original Tex-Mex songs and pop ballads.

In August 1995 Abraham Quintanilla, the father of murdered Tejano star Selena, invited MioSotis to visit the Corpus Christi, Texas recording studio where Selena had recorded most of her music. During the emotional visit they remembered Selena and her music, and MioSoty was given the chance to sing to Quintanilla with Selena’s tracks.

Following her graduation from college with honors and a bachelor's degree in Communications, Arts and Media, she began recording and self-producing (along with producer George Mena) her second solo album, Nace una Estrella in 1996 on Lynn Hidalgo's label. The album contained bilingual cover versions of Barbra Streisand's "What kind of fool" and Dominican composer Juan Luis Guerra's "Bachata Rosa." Her salsa single “Señora,” a song about learning that one's lover is married, became an instant hit, eventually achieving gold record status, pushing sales of Nace una Estrella to over 50,000 units upon release. The video was also tremendously popular, and MioSoty quickly achieved celebrity status. She was asked to perform a private concert for the FBI in New York. She was also invited to sing back-up vocals on José Octavio's 1997 romantic merengue album Confundido.

In June 1997 MioSoty became the first Latin artist to sing the national anthem at Yankee Stadium in New York. She was invited to sing in honor of Puerto Rican Pittsburgh Pirate right-fielder and humanitarian Roberto Clemente.

MioSotis' popularity enabled her to tour extensively, performing throughout Latin America, Canada, the U.S., Caribbean, South America, Europe, and Japan. Due to her background in theater and dance, she was able to stage colorful, exciting, and well crafted live performances. She has played large venues, such as Madison Square Garden in New York City, La Plaza de Toro in Spain, and La Feria de Cali in Colombia. She recorded the commercial jingle promoting the Santo Domingo Action Park in Santo Domingo, Dominican Republic in late 1997 and performed the first concert held at the new venue's opening night in December.

In 1998 MioSoty won her first Premio ACE award from the Association of Latin Entertainment Critics for Best Female Singer in the Tropical Music category for “Señora.” Goya Foods chose her to perform a concert series for Hispanic Heritage Month festivals. European film companies Ciby 2000 and Milan/BMG recruited her to record "Amame" and "Amor es Eso" as theme songs for the French film La Femme du Cosmonaut (The Astronaut's Wife). MioSoty filmed the music video for “Amame” in Paris, France and went on a promotional tour throughout France and Spain for the movie's premiere.

MioSotis' third album, Ardiente, was released in 2003 and received a Latin Globe award for Best Female Salsa Album.

MioSotis played at the July 23, 2001 concert commemorating the closing of the famous Copacabana nightclub in New York City, appearing with Elvis Crespo, Fernando Villalona, and Mili Quezada, among others. The concert was recorded and later released on CD as 60 años de historia (60 Years of History). The following month she became the last artist to perform at the World Trade Center in Manhattan, appearing at the last annual Latin Summer Fest concert held in the plaza between the Twin Towers. One year after the 9/11 attacks on the World Trade Center MioSoty sang the national anthem live on Latin radio station 105.9 FM to commemorate the victims.

MioSotis' salsa single, “Por Temor” was released in 2002 and quickly climbed the Latin and dance charts. She gave several television and radio interviews before beginning a tour in April. She played clubs and festivals (Calle Ocho in Miami, Florida) in New York and Florida, and was crowned queen of the CAC Kiwanis Flamingo Fest in Miami. April 21, 2002 was proclaimed MioSotis Day by the mayor and people of Hialeah, Florida.

During 2003 MioSotis devoted the majority of her time to being with her extended family. In February 2004 she was seriously injured in a car accident in Queens, New York involving a drunk driver. She was hospitalized with serious injuries and underwent extensive physical therapy for almost six months. After a course of strenuous therapy and time off work to rest and heal, MioSotis was able to regain enough mobility that she could plan a return to the stage.

While still coping with chronic pain from her injuries, MioSotis returned to work in 2005. She put salsa on hold to concentrate on jazz, when she was invited to perform with two-time Grammy Award winner and Latin jazz musician Horacio “El Negro” Hernandez and Grammy Award-winning flutist Dave Valentin. She and Valentin appeared on stage at the Blue Note in Tokyo, Japan as special guest stars for El Negro and Robby Band. She then embarked on an eight-month world tour with El Negro and Valentin.

She planned to begin producing a new album following the jazz tour but discovered she was pregnant. Her son Brandon Alexander (featured on her children's television show The ChiquiMundo Show) was born in 2006 and she chose to take time off from her music career to care for him and produce ChiquiMundo. She returned to writing and producing music in 2008 and began a new album in 2009. As fate would have it, MioSotis is currently on Tour with The New York Band, as this legendary merengue group became active once again in May 2016.

In 2020 Miosotis continued being a solo artist and also became record label head for Fetiva Music / 24k Records with Raul Acosta, owner and lead singer of well-known merengue group Oro Solido.

== Television Personality ==
MioSotis gave several promotional interviews on local and national Spanish-language channels such as Telemundo, LTV/QPTV, and Univision, and became popular as well as familiar to viewers. It was not surprising when LTV hired MioSotis to co-host the popular variety show Viva el Pueblo in 2004. She also developed and hosted the children’s educational variety show The ChiquiMundo Show for LTV/QPTV, which debuted that summer. ChiquiMundo was relaunched in 2009, this time featuring MioSots' son and nephews.

In 2005 she hosted the Hispanic Youth Showcase talent competition Road to Stardom for New Jersey public television station NJN.

== Stylistic Influences ==
MioSotis grew up listening to a variety of Latin and world music genres in New York and she mixed merengue, pop, and salsa in her early recordings. Her Latin music influences growing up were Gloria Estefan, Celia Cruz, Wilfrido Vargas, and Mili Quezada. Her favorite artists in the U.S./English mainstream market included Whitney Houston, Aretha Franklin, Michael Jackson, and Janet Jackson. She said in 2010, "The first CD I remember buying myself was Janet Jackson's Control. I would even learn all the dance steps to her videos. Particularly I remember learning the steps to 'Pleasure Principal and even recreating the music track of 'When I Think of You' on my first electronic keyboard. I loved the bass line on that song." The first concert she attended was Janet Jackson's performance at Madison Square Garden on her Rhythm Nation tour.

== Humanitarian Work ==
MioSotis became involved with children’s charities in 1999, both as a volunteer and a fundraiser. Growing up in New York City, she saw first-hand how neglected and abused low-income children often went without proactive assistance or advocacy. She performed benefit shows at the Queens Lighthouse School for Blind Children and the Marble Hill Nursery School in the Bronx, New York. In the 1990s and 2000s she joined other well-known Latin artists at benefit concerts to raise funds for the Sergio Vargas Foundation to help children all over the world. Following the success of her children's television show The ChiquiMundo Show MioSotis began a non-profit children's charity, the ChiquiMundo Foundation, of which she is president. The foundation holds fundraising events, such as winter coat drives and holiday toy drives for children of impoverished families.

== Discography ==
Hazme Soñar, 1995. Released by RCA Records 1999.

Nace Una Estrella (Lynn Hidalgo), 1997. Released by Romantico in 1999.

Various Artists, Sexy Latin Beats compilation, includes MioSoty's' "Nada Sin Ti (Nothing Without You)" and "Being With You (Cerca de Ti)" (Radikal), 1999.

“Amame,” single, 1999

La Femme du Cosmonaute soundtrack, 1999

Ardiente (Mas Music), 2000

Various Artists, Tropical Party Mix compilation, includes MioSotis' "Sabras," (Rumba Jams), 2000

Various Artists, 60 Años de Historia Grabado en Copacabana (Sony Music Distribution), 2001

Various Artists, Salsa Flava compilation, includes Miosotis' "Arránca," (BMG Special Products), 2002

Various Artists, Tropical Latin Flava compilation, includes MioSotis' "Soltera y Libre," (BMG Special Products), 2002

“Por Temor,” single, 2003

"EL No Sabe." salsa single, 2009

"The New York Band, Greatest Hits Live", album 2019

"Amado Mio," single, 2020

"EL No Lo Sabe," Bachata single 2020

"Miosotis & The Spice Band," album 2020

"Bachata Nights," album 2020
