= Palavé =

Coordinates: 18°28′47″N 70°02′50″W

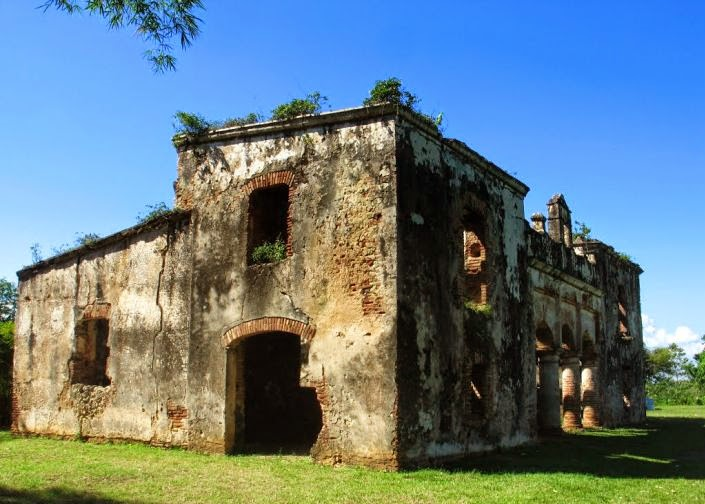
Palavé Palace

Palavé is an ancient big house located roughly 22 km to the west of Santo Domingo, the capital of the Dominican Republic. Its unique architectural style and ancient age has led to its consideration to be put on the World Heritage list of sites which have "outstanding universal value" to the world.

== World Heritage Status ==
This site was added to the UNESCO World Heritage Tentative List on November 21, 2001 in the Cultural category.
