= Yiyo Sarante =

- Also known as: La Voz de la Salsa
- Born: Eduardo Alberto Sarante Rosario; January 25, 1979 (age 47); Baní, Peravia Province, Dominican Republic
- Origin: Bavaro, La Altagracia Province, Dominican Republic
- Genre: Salsa, salsa romántica
- Occupations: Singer, percussionist
- Instruments: Vocals, percussion
- Years active: 1999-present
- Labels: Chuberry, Planet Records, TranKYouTV

Eduardo Alberto Sarante Rosario (born January 25, 1979), know professionally as Yiyo Sarante, is a Dominican salsa singer and percussionist.

== Early life ==
Sarante was born in Baní, located in the Peravia Province to Ángel Sarante and María Perdomo. He grew up in a musical household as the seventh of nine children— five, including Sarante, who went to pursue musical careers, including Julián Sarante and producer José Sarante. Sarante began performing as a percussionist in local orchestras before transitioning into singing.
