= Vicky Shell =

- Born: Belkis Arias; June 14, 1967 (age 58); Santo Domingo, Dominican Republic
- Genres: Latin, Tropical, Salsa, Merengue, World
- Occupations: Singer, educator, songwriter
- Instruments: Vocals, percussion, maracas, bongos, guiro, idiophone, clave

Belkis Arias, known professionally as Vicky Shell (born June 14, 1967) is a Dominican singer, educator and songwriter. She is known as an artist of Latin tropical rhythms in addition to other styles of music.

== Early life ==
Vicky Shell was born in the Dominican Republic in 1967. She came to the United States at the age of 9.

== Career ==
Vicky Shell started early in her life with local bands and as time went on she went solo leading her own band. Independently she recorded her first album. In 1988 she pursued her musical studies in the Bronx Community College, where she took various credits in music. She had continued her studies in the university of City college of New York City and graduated with a Bachelor of Science in Education.

She became a school teacher in New York City schools and Yonkers public schools. She eventually decided to take up a career in music and recorded her second tropical album.

Vicky Shell released her album Salsa Con Pimienta. Music critics and journalists have acknowledged her for her elucidation of songs such as "Como Una Sombra", "Mueva Las Maracas", "Hombre de Hierro", and "Musica Latina". Shell's catalog follows the genre styles of rhumba, Latin jazz, bolero son, salsa romantica, and Descarga. Music producer Oscar-nominated and Grammy Award winner Ray Santos arranged and collaborated, as well From Fania All-Stars

Although absent from the music industry for some time, Vicky Shell returned in 2017 with the music video for the single "La Musica Latina." Vicky Shell has received numerous awards and acknowledgements throughout several countries for her musical contributions throughout the years.

== Discography ==
"Album "Vicky Shell Salsa Con Pimienta!"
Como Una Sombra
La Música Latina
Mueve Las Maracas (Salsa Rhumba Latin Jazz)
Hombre De Hierro
"Album "Vicky Shell Tropicalísima"
Te Esperaré
El Morenito
Quedate (Merengue)
El Meneito
"Single / Sencillo "Vicky Shell Olé!"
Guaguanco Español
"Single / Sencillo Vicky Shell La Musica Latina
"Album "Vicky Shell Caribbean"
"Single / Sencillo "El Nazareno"
