= Luys Bien =

Dominican singer

- Born: Dominican Republic
- Occupations: Singer; musician; songwriter
- Musical career
- Genres: Latin; Merengue; Bachata; Salsa; Bolero
- Instruments: Vocals; guitar

Luys Bien is a Dominican singer, musician and songwriter. He interprets poetical lyrics with a melodious voice in a variety of Latin music genres, including bachata, merengue, bolero and salsa. In 2022, Luys Bien released his first collaboration, Latidos de Tambor with the legendary musician Ramón Orlando.

== Biography ==
Luys Bien debuted in December 2020 with Firme Albor, an EP of five songs written by Dominican poet Cristino Gómez. Firme Albor tells the story of a lover whom moves from living in solitude and sad verses to living the dreamed love and singing lovely tunes. A year later, in December 2021, Luys Bien released "Mujer Amiga" a merengue arranged and produced by Dominican legendary musician Ramón Orlando.

Previously, in 2021 Luys Bien released an adaptations to bachata from the Taiwanese song "Ho Hay Yan 喔嗨洋" by Suming.

Also in 2021, Luys Bien aired the singles "Aún Te Amo" and "Déjame Nacer", a lullaby at Dominican rhythm pambiche.

In summer of 2022, Luys Bien released the merengue "Nos Queremos Tanto".

== Discography ==
=== EP ===
- Firme Albor (2020)

=== Singles ===
- "Motivo De Tu Fe" (2025)
- "Cuando Ya Dolía" (2024)
- "Regresar Para Qué" (2023)
- "Latidos de Tambor" (2022) with Ramón Orlando
- "Nos Queremos Tanto" (2022)
- "Mujer Amiga" (2021)
- "Déjame Nacer"(2021)
- "Ho Hay Yan" (2021)
- "Aún Te Amo" (2021)
