= Yoskar Sarante =

Dominican bachata singer (1970–2019)

- Born: 2 January 1970; Santo Domingo, Dominican Republic
- Died: 28 January 2019 (aged 49) Orlando, Florida, U.S.
- Genres: Bachata
- Occupation: Singer
- Instrument: Vocals
- Years active: 1994–2019

Yoskar "El Prabu" Sarante (2 January 1970 – 28 January 2019) was a prominent Dominican bachata singer.

== Early life ==
Yoskar Sarante, born in 1970, was one of the most prolific singers of new bachata of Santo Domingo in the Dominican Republic. Born to Domingo and Ramona Sarante Ventura, he was the second son of the family, but he was the first to be linked to art. According to Yoskar Sarante, the young artist said that as a child he would walk with his father in parks and public squares singing while his father accompanied him on guitar, and that it was their main source of income. He took his first steps into merengue and belonged to the International Grupo Melao a merengue band in the Dominican Republic. Yoskar Sarante participated in several competitions for children, highlighting the most popular program of the season "Mundo Infantil." He worked with the nueva bachata movement, and was included on compilations such as Bachata Tipico and The Rough Guide to Bachata. During his career, he was invited to sing for the mayor at the New York Mets stadium, which gained him some acclaim in the United States. He was widely known internationally, and his music deals with romantic topics.

== Death ==
On January 28, 2019, he died from pneumonia due to a pulmonary fibrosis in a hospital in Orlando, Florida. He was surrounded by his loved ones.

== Discography ==
=== Studio albums ===
- El Prabu (1994)
- Niña Sedienta (1996)
- Si Fuera Ella (1998)
- Llora Alma Mía (2000)
- No Es Casualidad (2002)
- Viví (2004)
- Parada 37 (2006)
- Vuelve Vuelve (2008)
- Insuperable (2014)
  Le Pregunto Al Amor (2012)

=== Compilation albums ===
- Éxitos De Yoskar Sarante (2007)
- 1 (2015)
- 18 Éxitos Inmortales (2022)

=== EPs ===
- Quien Eres Tu (2016)
- Yoskar Por Siempre (2019)
