= Loyola Polytechnic Institute =

Jesuit College in the Dominican Republic

Coordinates: 18°24′40.62″N 70°6′47.62″W

- Instituto Politécnico Loyola
- Type: Private Roman Catholic Coeducational Basic and Higher education institution
- Established: August 12, 1952; 73 years ago
- Religious affiliation: Roman Catholic, (Jesuit)
- Academic affiliations: AUSJAL
- President: José Rafael Núñez Mármol, SJ
- Location: Padre Ángel Arias #1 San Cristóbal, San Cristobal, Dominican Republic
- Campus: 28 km. SW of Santo Domingo
- Website: superior.ipl.edu.do

Loyola Polytechnic Institute (Spanish: Instituto Politécnico Loyola or IPL) is an educational institution of basic and technological education in the Dominican Republic, founded by the Society of Jesus in 1952. Its Loyola Specialized Institute of Higher Education (IEESL) grants engineering degrees at the undergraduate and graduate level in the areas of agribusiness, electrical, industrial, and telecommunications. Its school for intermediate education offers degrees in agronomy, industrial mechanics, automotive and diesel mechanics, electrical installation & maintenance, electronic communications, and digital electronics & microcomputers. An elementary school and an English and French language school are also a part of IPL.

== Academics ==
=== Higher education ===
Loyola Specialized Institute of Higher Education is a state institution of higher level education, sponsored and administered by the Society of Jesus. It is authorized to grant degrees at the undergraduate and graduate level in specialty areas. As of 2009, it was one of 10 specialized institutes of higher education in the Dominican Republic. IEESL is a member of the Association of Universities Entrusted to the Society of Jesus in Latin America (AUSJAL), made up of 30 universities in 14 countries in the region. A profile of the skills expected of graduates of the four divisions of IEESL would in all cases include mastery of oral and written communication in English, in the area of their professional performance. Their specialized skills would include the following:

Agribusiness Engineer: implement and evaluate strategic development plans in agribusiness; select and manage human and financial resources and incorporate added value to the product; use technology to optimize business, natural resources, and sustainability; identify new products, markets and business opportunities, collect and analyze relevant information, organize the launch, implement and evaluate the progress of the business; plan, optimize, manage, monitor, and evaluate production processes in your area of competence; make decisions in the field of agribusiness management, from production to the domestic and international marketing; advise and manage companies producing agricultural products; perform the functions assumed in the field of engineering agribusiness applying the relevant ethical principles.

Electrical Engineering: system design, transmission and distribution of electricity; establish control standards and procedures to ensure the effective operation and safety of production and distribution systems, motors, and electrical equipment; design, create, optimize, and maintain electrical maintenance programs; participate in and oversee the construction of power plants, substations, and power lines; perform the functions assumed in the field of electrical engineering applying the relevant ethical principles; perform management functions in the field of electrical engineering; install and maintain electrical equipment; apply scientific and technological advances for good, sustainable development in the workplace; possess a leadership and entrepreneurial mindset that allows linking technological practice in the labor and business market; apply knowledge of physics, mathematics, and management in order to understand and develop the science of electrical engineering.

Industrial Engineer: plan, schedule, optimize, manage, monitor, and evaluate production processes in one's area of competence; formulate and evaluate industrial projects, goods, and services; analyze, design, assess, and manage complex integrated systems (man, machine, and equipment) in business and industry, mindful of Ignatian values; participate in the design of solutions to improve productivity of goods and services.

Telecommunications Network Engineer: recognize the true value of innovations in the field of new information and communications technology; instrumental, cognitive, and attitudinal skills for the design and installation of networks and communications systems; the foundations to design, implement, operate, manage, and support networked systems and wired and wireless communications.

=== Intermediate education ===
Agronomy: engage in farming and in agricultural product markets; help maintain agricultural and forestry systems; control agricultural pests and diseases; promote the conservation of natural resources and the organization of producers; interpret analysis of soil and agrochemicals.

Industrial Mechanics: evaluate and operate machinery and mechanical equipment; perform preventive and corrective maintenance; develop and interpret mechanical drawings; manufacture mechanical parts with tools and machines; handle classified materials on mechanics and heat treatments.

Automotive & Diesel Mechanics: interpret industrial blueprints of electrical and mechanical cars; develop plans for preventive and corrective maintenance on vehicles; repair hydraulic and pneumatic systems as well as injection diesel, gasoline, and electronic.

Electrical Installation & Maintenance: interpret and develop plans and wiring diagrams; perform preventive and corrective electrical maintenance and install electromechanical equipment; perform residential and industrial electrical installations; apply electrical calculations, codes, and regulations.

Electronic Communications: interpret plans, catalogs, manuals, electrical, and electronic symbols for communication equipment; perform preventive and corrective maintenance; repair communication equipment breakdowns; build, install, and repair antennas and make frequency adjustments.

Digital Electronics & Microcomputers: develop and monitor assembly of hardware and information processing equipment; install, repair, and maintain microprocessors and microcontrollers; interpret blueprints, electrical and electronic equipment symbols; perform electrical maintenance, preventive and corrective.

== See also ==
- List of Jesuit sites
