= Bavaro =

Bavaro is a surname. Notable people with the surname include:

- David Bavaro (born 1967), American football player
- Drew Bavaro (born 2000), American ice hockey player
- Lautaro Bavaro (born 1994), Argentine rugby union player
- Mark Bavaro (born 1963), American football player
- Michael Bavaro, American filmmaker

== See also ==
- Bávaro, place in the Dominican Republic
