= Rahintel =

RAHINTEL
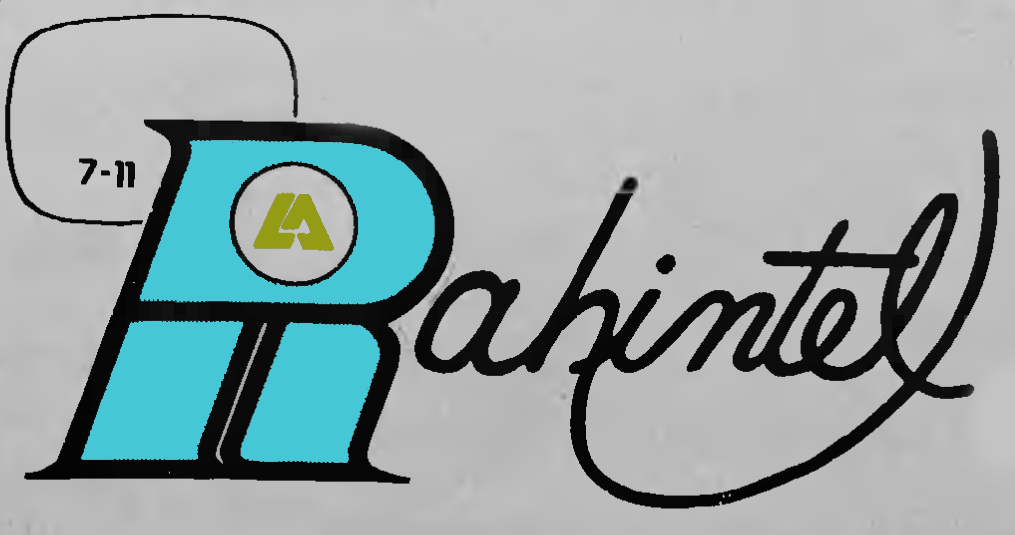
- Country: Dominican Republic
- Broadcast area: Dominican Republic
- Affiliates: Canal 7 Cibao
- Headquarters: Santo Domingo

Programming
- Language: Spanish
- Picture format: 480i SDTV

Ownership
- Owner: Grupo Financiero Universal

History
- Launched: 28 February 1959
- Closed: 4 April 1999
- Replaced by: Antena 7

Availability

Terrestrial
- VHF: Channel 7 (Santo Domingo & South & East Zone y) Channel 11 All Cibao

Rahintel (stylized as RAHINTEL) was the first privately owned television network in the Dominican Republic and the second such network to start television broadcasts in the DR after La Voz Dominicana. It was owned and operated by Grupo Financiero Universal until the latter's bankruptcy in the late-1980s and was headquartered in Santo Domingo.

== History ==
=== Founding and early years ===
The channel's origins are traced as far back as 1959. Pedro Bonilla, owner of Radio HIN, expressed the will to launch a private television station and launches Rahintel (Radio HIN Televisión) on February 28, 1959, in a shop located near the grounds of the Fair of Peace and Fraternity of the Free World, with television equipment from the United States.

The initial purpose of the creator and, therefore, of the TV company in general were, initially, to contribute to the education of the population and to serve the economic and industrial sectors as a vehicle for promoting their products.

Artistically, Rahintel was a little more liberal in contrast to La Voz Dominicana (the current 4RD). However, this climate of artistic freedom that opened in Rahintel bothered Jose Arismendy Trujillo (Petan), director of La Voz Dominicana (and brother of tyrant Rafael Leonidas Trujillo). But Petán couldn't remove the plant - or even acquire it - given the links between Pepe Bonilla and Rafael Leonidas Trujillo Martinez (Ramfis).

Because of that, shows like "La hora del moro" (Hour of the Chow) were created, which opened the doors to many young artists who tested their talents. This program was run by the Dominican musician Rafael Solano and he gave the start of the careers of singers such as Nini Cáffaro.

On this channel other artists appeared with special programs which, with wide appeal, searched for new heights. The channel started airing rock n' roll programming hosted by Walterio Colly and his band and comedian Milton Peláez who later launched his program, El Patio de Medrano.

At this time, coverage was limited to the capital and some nearby towns and their programming only ran from 6:00 PM to 10:00 PM and, on rare occasions, until 11. In addition to live programs, its programming consisted of American series and comedies.

=== Growth and expansion ===
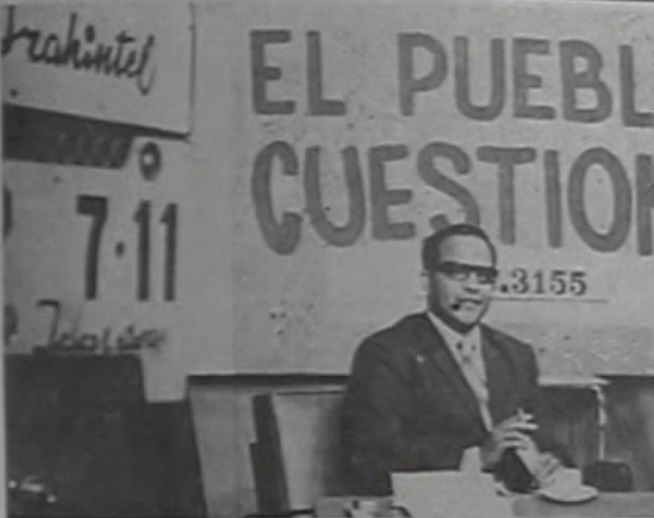
Studio of El Pueblo Cuestiona, 1970s

Several years later, in 1966, their coverage extended into the country via channels 7 and 11 and its signal was extended to the north and northwest. Notably, in the city of Santiago de los Caballeros, Rahintel operated on channel 11. However, they managed to create another frequency to transmit channel 7 in Santiago. This channel was known as Canal 7 Cibao.

During the decade, Rahintel made their first satellite transmission, becoming the first channel of the Dominican Republic to do it.

=== Golden Age ===
In 1983, Pedro Bonilla sold the TV station to Grupo Financiero Universal, controlled at the time by Leonel Almonte, who would expand the plant and their television programming, along with Milton Peláez, who launched offers to several shows on Color Visión. The episode of the "war of the ballots" had begun.

Rahintel logo upon being acquired by Grupo Financiero Universal

At the time, Rahintel won this "war" and managed to move several famous and competitive programs to the channel, having also included cartoons and anime like Force Five, Candy Candy, Thundercats, among others.

In the late 80s, Grupo Financiero Universal collapsed and several of their acquired artists and shows left the channel. However, Rahintel continued broadcasting normally, still airing animated shows with good ratings. Leonel Almonte's financial scandal caused 42,000 people to lose their savings.

=== Decline, reboost and shutdown ===
In the early 90s, a program called "Sabadíssimo" was created and was led by José Guillermo Sued but was later removed from the schedule. Telenovelas like Mari Amor and shows like Mission: Impossible, Tarzan, MacGyver, Freddy's Nightmares and other popular shows like Nubeluz were also transmitted. On September 10, 1994, it lost its affiliate Canal 7 Cibao per a presidential decree, joining TV13, violating Law 903 from 1978. The new law only made Rahintel's originating station (channel 7 in Santo Domingo) and relay stations (channels 7 and 11 in Santiago and 70 in Navisa) valid.

By the very end of the decade, Rahintel in decline. Still, ratings surprisingly increased with reruns of Candy Candy, and managed to obtain the rights to broadcast Tigres de Licey and Leones del Escogido matches for the 1998-1999 Dominican baseball season. These two teams came to compete for the championship that season and all occurrences of that final series were transmitted by channel 7. However, despite the transmission of the matches gave them an increase in ratings, their fate was sealed. After 40 years of operations, Rahintel silently shuts down in April 1999. The frequency was sold for a sum of $15.000.000 to Grupo Mercasid, who, in October, launched a new channel, Antena Latina.
