= Sexappeal =

Dominican singer (born 1972)

- Born: Antonio Rodríguez Castillo; August 22, 1972 (age 54); Santo Domingo, Dominican Republic
- Genres: Salsa music; Merengue; Bolero
- Occupation: Singer
- Instruments: Vocals; Güira; conga; tambora
- Years active: 2001–present

Antonio Rodríguez Castillo (born August 22, 1972), better known as Sexappeal, is a Dominican singer from Santo Domingo. In 2005, he was awarded ''Best Dominican Salsa Singer of the Year'' in the Casandra awards, the most important in the country.

== Career ==
=== Early life ===
Castillo was born on August 22, 1972, in Villa Juana, a municipality in Santo Domingo Norte, Dominican Republic. While growing up in Santo Domingo, his father wanted him to enroll in the Dominican Navy but he wanted to play music and sing, so his father suggested that he could enlist and play for the armed forces music band, but Sexappeal joined the ballet florklorico group of the Dominican ministry of culture and some Merengue music groups as a güira, tambora y conga player.

=== 2000s ===
In 2001, after the release of the single La llorona, Sexappeal was awarded New Artist of the Year in the Casandra awards in Dominican Republic. This song gained international recognition and has been used ever since to dance and teach Salsa music for its fast music tempo. The song reached J&N's ears and in 2002, Sexappeal was signed by the record label, later recording Necesito Más, his second studio album. He was nominated New Artist of the Year in 2004, this time in the international latin music Lo Nuestro Awards in the tropical category with the song Meneando la Cola.

In 2006, he was awarded in the BMI awards ceremony with the producer and songwriter of Meneando la Cola, Ramon Orlando. The album's success continued and Sexappeal was awarded ''Best Dominican Salsa Singer of the Year'' in the Casandra awards in 2005. In 2008, he was nominated in the Casandra awards again, this time in two categories: ''Best Dominican Salsa Singer of the Year'' and ''Song of the Year''; winning for the second time the first category and sharing 'Song of the Year'' with Juan Luis Guerra.

== Discography ==
La Llorona -single (2001)

Necesito Mas (2003)

Mal o Bien (2006)

Porque No Vienes (2011)
