= Miriam Cruz =

Dominican singer (born 1968)

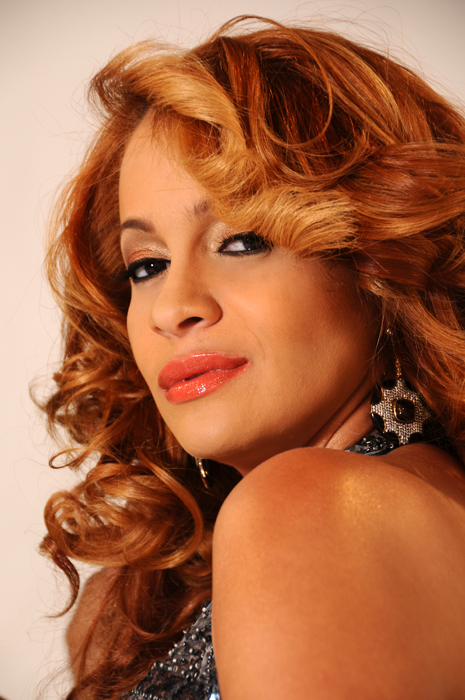
- Cruz in 2010
- Born: Miriam Aracelis Cruz Ramírez; August 17, 1968 (age 58); Santo Domingo, Dominican Republic
- Other names: La Diva del Merengue ("The Diva of Merengue")
- Occupations: Musician; actress
- Years active: 1985 - present
- Musical career
- Genre: Merengue
- Labels: Karen Records; Lanhut Records; La Oreja Media Group, Inc.

Miriam Aracelis Cruz Ramírez (born August 17, 1968), is a Dominican merengue musician and actress. Described as a "world famous merengue artist", she is best known for being the lead vocalist of the successful female merengue group, Las Chicas del Can. In 1992, she formed her own group called Míriam Cruz y Las Chicas. In 2022, after performing for four decades, she released the single, "Tú ganas". In the same year, she performed at the Lincoln Center.

== Discography ==
=== Studio albums ===
- Chicán (1985)
- Nada Común (1991)
- Nueva Vida (1993)
- Punto y Aparte (2001)
- Aquí Estoy (2006)
- Siempre Diva (2013)
- Me Sacudi (2015)
- Miriam Collection (2016)
- Sali De Ti (2017)

=== Singles ===
- "La Loba"
- "Tómalo Tú"
- "Te Propongo"
- "El Ñoño"
- "Me Siento tan Sola"
- "Agua de Sal"
- "Quiero hacerte el amor"
- "La Guayaba Podrida"
- "Me Muero"
- "Quiero"
- "Oye"
- "Es Cosa de Él"
- "Es Necesario"
- "La Carnada"
- "Esa Loca"

== Honors and awards ==
- 2013 Best Merengue Orchestra, Soberano Awards
- 2014 Merengue of the Year, Soberano Awards ("Esa Loca")
