= Cuco Valoy =

Dominican singer-songwriter and musician

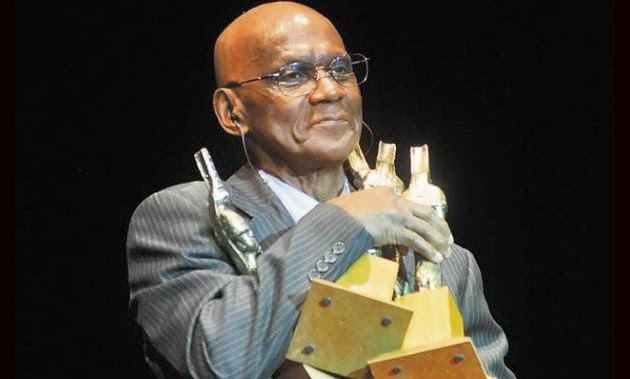

Background information
- Also known as: El Brujo, El Pupy de Quisqueya
- Born: January 6, 1937 (age 89); Manoguayabo, Santo Domingo, Dominican Republic
- Genres: Salsa, son montuno, merengue, guaracha, bolero
- Occupations: Singer, songwriter, instrumentalist
- Instruments: Vocals, maracas, guira, güiro, guitar, tambora, congas, bongos, cuatro, plena
- Years active: 1970s–1990s
- Formerly of: Los Ahijados; Los Virtuosos; La Tribu

Cuco Valoy (born January 6, 1937, in Manoguayabo, Santo Domingo, Dominican Republic) is a Dominican Republic singer, songwriter, percussionist and guitarist, who is versatile in salsa, son montuno, guaracha and merengue. He began performing with his brother Martín, under the name Los Ahijados. Valoy is the father of Ramón Orlando, with whom he formed the band Los Virtuosos, later changed to La Tribu. He is widely known for the song "Juliana", which was covered by the group DLG; a cover that featured Valoy's vocals.

== Discography ==
- 1975: No Me Empuje!
- 1976: El Brujo
- 1977: Un Momento... Llegaron Los Virtuosos
- 1978: La Tribu en New York
- 1978: Tremenda Salsa
- 1978: Salsa Con Coco
- 1979: Arrollando
- 1980: El Magnífico Cuco Valoy Con Los Virtuosos
- 1980: Tiza!
- 1981: Puros Cañonazos
- 1981: Sin Comentarios
- 1986: Con Sabor Del Trópico
- 1992: El Que Sabe
- 1993: Bien Sobao/Y Lo Virtuoso (Kubaney)
- 1993: Lo Mejor de Cuco Valoy (Kubaney)
- 1993: Lo Mejor de Cuco Valoy, Vol. 2 (Kubaney)
- 1995: Época de Oro (Kubaney)
- 1996: Disco de Oro (Kubaney)
- 2003: Gold (Edenways)
- 2004: Intacto (Kubaney)
- 2004: Grandes Soneros de la Época
- 2007: Sonero y Valor
- 2008: Reserva Musical
- 2009: La Piedra
