= Rubby Pérez =

Dominican singer (1956–2025)

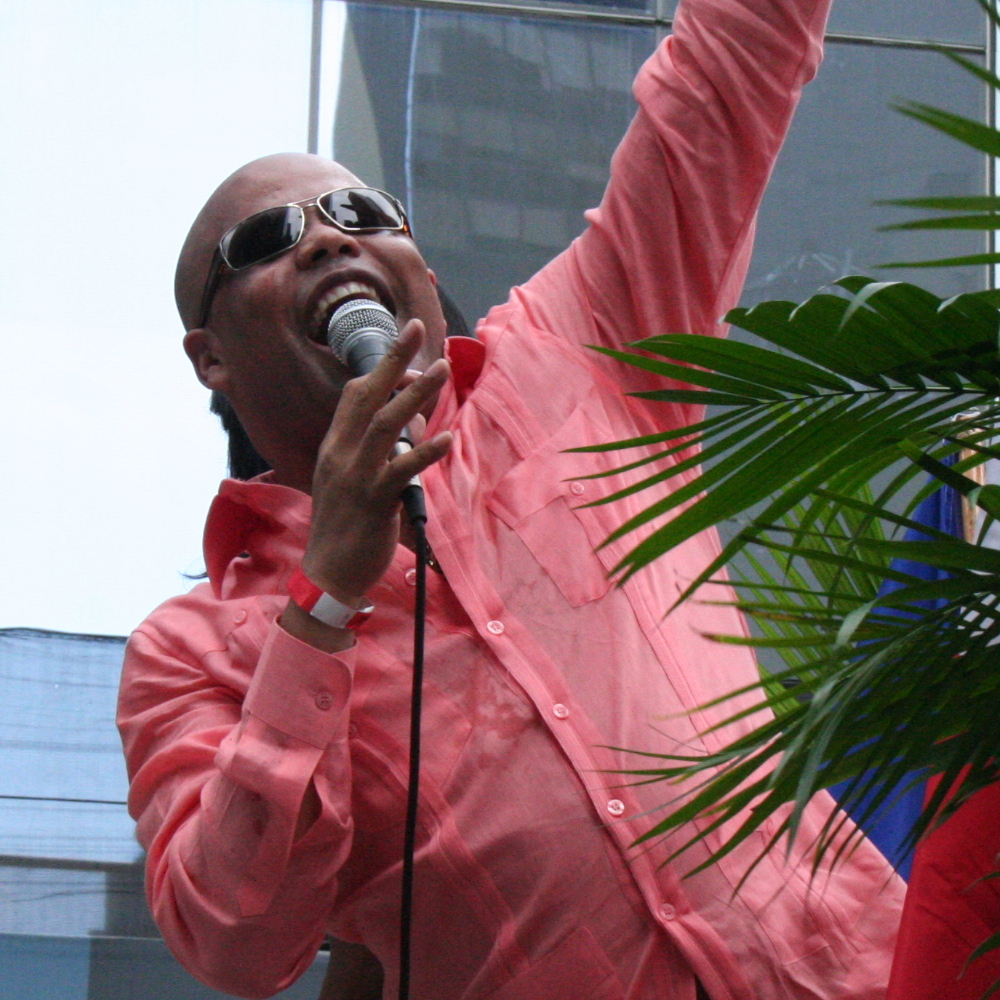
- Pérez performing in New York City in 2009

Background information
- Born: Roberto Antonio Pérez Herrera; 8 March 1956; Bajos de Haina, San Cristóbal Province, Dominican Republic
- Died: 8 April 2025 (aged 69) Santo Domingo, Dominican Republic
- Genre: Merengue
- Occupation: Singer
- Instrument: Vocals
- Years active: 1978–2025
- Labels: Karen; BMG; Palenke
- Spouse: Inés Lizardo (m. 1974; died 2022)
- Partner: Leidy Rosario (2024–2025)

Roberto Antonio Pérez Herrera (8 March 1956 – 8 April 2025), known professionally as Rubby Pérez, was a Dominican merengue singer.

Rubby performed with various orchestras until Wilfrido Vargas offered him the opportunity to become the lead vocalist of his orchestra during the recording of the album El Funcionario (1983). The album made the "Los 600 de Latinoamérica" list at 90th place. Due to his distinctive vocal qualities, he earned the nickname "the highest voice of merengue" (la voz más alta del merengue).

Pérez was killed in the Jet Set nightclub roof collapse on 8 April 2025.

== Early life and career ==
Pérez aspired to be a baseball player in his youth, but then turned to music when a car accident caused permanent damage to his left leg. After studying music at the National Conservatory of Santo Domingo, he became a member of school groups, such as the Choir Youth Guidance Society, The Youth of Bani in 1978, and Los Hijos del Rey. Pérez then entered Wilfrido Vargas's orchestra in 1980 to 1987, during which time he popularized hits including "El Africano", "Volveré", "Cuando Estés con Él", and "Cobarde Cobarde".

His foray as a solo artist in 1987 brought him hits such as "Buscando Tus Besos", "Enamorado de Ella", and "Tú Vas a Volar", of which the former two were hits in the Billboard charts. His album Rubby Pérez spent two weeks at the Tropical list, peaking at number 15, and his song "Love Her" was number 29 on the Latin charts.

He won Casandra Awards in the categories of "Orchestra of the Year" and "Merengue of the Year". In Venezuela, he won gold and platinum albums in 1988 with his first solo album, Buscando Tus Besos.

On June 15, 2025, Nicolás Maduro granted him Venezuelan nationality posthumously; it was presented to her daughter Zulinka in Caracas, where she was accompanied by Sergio Vargas, Bonny Cepeda and Fernando Villalona.

== Personal life ==
He was a father to seven children. Among them is his daughter Zulinka, who worked with him as a backup singer in his band. He was married to Inés Antonia Lizardo for 48 years until her death on October 15, 2022, due to breast cancer.

== Death ==
Pérez was killed on April 8, 2025 in the Jet Set nightclub roof collapse, which occurred during one of his concerts in Santo Domingo. He was 69. Pérez was performing "De color de rosa" with his daughter Zulinka, her husband Miguel Báez (who were his backing vocalists) and his band. Zulinka and her husband survived but the band's saxophonist, Luis Solís, known as "Chican", died.

Following his death, Pérez's remains were laid at the Eduardo Brito National Theater, where a memorial service was held.

== Philanthropy ==
Pérez was recognized by the Committee of Latin American Political Parties in the United States (COPOLA USA) for his assistance to victims of the magnitude 7.0 M_{w} earthquake that struck Haiti in January 2010.

In 2023, Pérez was the headliner for a fundraiser celebration organized by the New York State Office of General Services, an arm of the New York State Executive Department, in honour of National Hispanic Heritage Month.

== Discography ==
Studio albums

- Con Altura (1986)
- Fiesta para Dos! (1988)
- Rubby Pérez (1989)
- Simplemente Amor (1990)
- Amores Extraños (1995)
- No te Olvides (1998)
- Volando Alto (2001)
- El Cantante (2002)
- Tonto Corazón (2004)
- Dulce Veneno (2007)
- Genial (2010)
- Hecho Está (2022)
- La Voz y La Trompeta (2025)
