= Fernando Villalona =

Dominican merengue singer (born 1955)

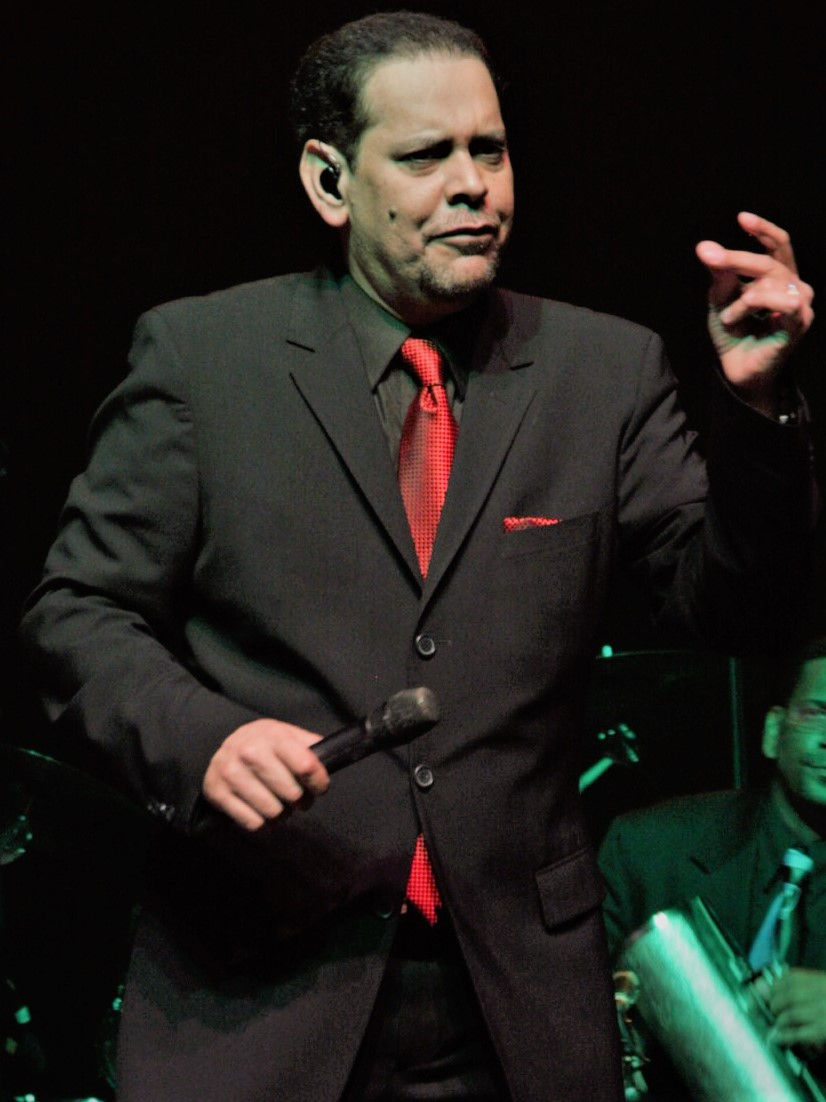
- Villalona in 2010

Background information
- Also known as: Fernandito Villalona; El Mayimbe
- Born: Ramon Fernando Villalona Evora; May 7, 1955 (age 71); Monte Cristi, Dominican Republic
- Genres: Merengue, Bachata, Cristiana, Bolero
- Years active: 1971 – present

Ramón Fernando Villalona Évora (born May 7, 1955), known professionally as Fernando Villalona, is a Dominican merengue singer. Considered to be one of the most important merengue artists in the genre's history, Villalona began singing in the early 1970s; his popularity started to grow by the late 1970s and has not declined ever since. He is the first Dominican artist to call himself "El Mayimbe", with the second being Antony Santos.

== Early years ==
Fernando Villalona was born in Monte Cristi Province, in the northwest region of the Dominican Republic. His father was Ángel Ramón Villalona and his mother was Virginia Arcadia Évora de Villalona. He grew up with his nine siblings and parents in the municipality of Loma de Cabrera, in Dajabón Province where he attended his first studies and began his artistic activities. At the age of 15, he was the representative of his hometown at the Festival of the Dominican Voice in 1971.

== Career ==
Fernando began singing at a very early age and became popular after participating in "El Festival de la Voz", an amateur TV talent show. After that, merengue icon Wilfrido Vargas hired him to be part of his group Los Hijos del Rey but Fernando and the group would soon be separated after his popularity became larger than the group itself. Throughout his career, Fernando was dubbed "El Mayimbe of Merengue". "El Mayimbe" is a phrase that comes from the Taíno, the indigenous people of the Dominican Republic, meaning "village chief". It eventually came to mean "leader" or "boss".

He would then go into a period of drugs and isolation but never stopped singing, recording some of his best music during that period. Songs such as "Tabaco y Ron," "Celos," "Te Amo Demasiado," "La Hamaquita," "Dominicano Soy," "Sonámbulo," and "Carnaval" among others became popular in the 1980s. "Quisqueya," "No Podrás," "Música Latina," "Retorno," and "Me he Enamorado" were some of his biggest hits in the 1990s.

Fernando Villalona participated in Somos El Mundo 25 Por Haiti, along with other superstars such as Shakira, Ricky Martin, Romeo Santos and Enrique Iglesias.

In 2011, he celebrated 40 years in the music business and decided to make a Christian album. In Mi Luz, released October 2011, Villalona praises God, sings about his troubled past and how his life has changed over the years.

In 2012, Villalona recorded "El Color de Tu Mirada" with American singer/songwriter Victoria Daly. The song was written specifically for Daly by Gilberto de Ose to be sung with Villalona. The music video was filmed and directed by René Brea in the Dominican Republic. It was released late November/early December. The music video went on to be nominated for the 2013 Soberano Awards in April.

== Personal life ==
Villalona was married to Evelyn Jorge, a woman of Puerto Rican origin, and they have a daughter.

== Discography ==
- La Tuerca (1981)
- ¡Feliz Cumbé! (1982)
- El Mayimbe' (1982)
- ...Así Soy Yo! (1983)
- Fernandito... Canta al Amor (1983)
- Fernandito (1984)
- Ayer y Hoy (1984)
- ¡A la Carga! (1985)
- Para Mi Pueblo... Todo (1986)
- La Cartita (1987)
- Romántico (1988)
- Esta Es Mi Historia (1989)
- Todo (1990)
- El Niño Mimado (1993)
- Confundido (1995)
- Soy Un Hombre Feliz (1996)
- Bolerísimo (1996)
- Amigo (1998)
- Nací Para Cantar (1999)
- El Mayimbe En Bachata (2000)
- Mal Acostumbrado (2002)
- 15 Grandes Éxitos (2004)
- El Gran Mayimbe (2007)
- Mi Luz (2011)

=== Compilations ===
- 15 Grandes Éxitos (2004)
- El Gran Mayimbe (2007)

== See also ==
- List of people from the Dominican Republic
