= Soberano Awards =

Dominican award

- Current: 42th Annual Soberano Awards
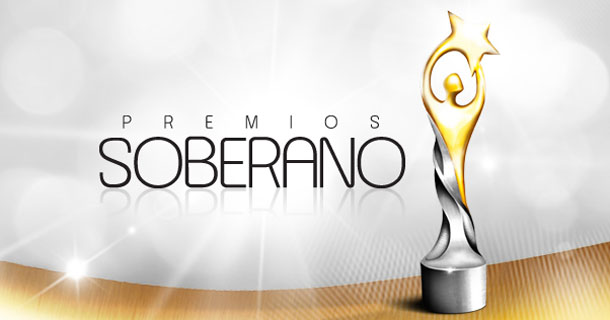
- Country: Dominican Republic
- Presented by: Asociación de Cronistas de Arte (ACROARTE); Cervecería Nacional Dominicana (CND)
- First award: 1985
- Website: premiossoberanos.com.do (in Spanish)

The Soberano Awards (formerly Casandra Awards) are the Dominican Republic music awards, which are awarded annually by Asociación de Cronistas de Arte (ACROARTE) in Santo Domingo, Dominican Republic. Often referenced in music line-ups to delineate a musician's popularity in Hispanic countries. Notable winners include Mozart La Para, Bad Bunny, El Alfa, Prince Royce, and Don Omar. It airs annually in the spring on Color Visión in the Dominican Republic.

== History ==
The Soberano Awards (formerly known as Casandra Awards) is an award given since 1985, by the Association of Art Critics of the Dominican Republic. The ceremony is held annually since 1992 in Santo Domingo at the Teatro Nacional.

=== Name change ===
The awards were called Casandra Awards (Premios Casandra in Spanish) since 1985, which was honoring the entertainer Casandra Damirón, but it was later renamed in 2012 ending the dispute with her family, to Soberano Awards (Premios Soberano (Note: The name "Premios Soberano" is still a tribute to Casandra Damirón, who is recognized in her country as "La Soberana de la Canción") in Spanish). The descendants of Casandra Damirón decided to withdraw the authorization to use Casandra's name from the awards name arguing that for the previous two years the ceremony departed from the rules which "have governed the award in terms of its content and raison d'être".
