= List of salsa and son vocalists =

This is a list of old salsa music and son cubano vocalists, as well as clave (rhythm) related styles, like guaracha, guagancó, mambo, cha cha cha, bomba.

== A ==
- Marc Anthony
- Carlos Argentino
- Joe Arroyo
- Vitín Avilés

== B ==
- Félix Baloy
- Justo Betancourt
- Rubén Blades

== C ==
- Tony Camargo
- Angel Canales
- Héctor Casanova
- Santiago Cerón
- Santos Colón
- Willie Colón
- Bobby Cruz
- Celia Cruz

== D ==
- Frankie Dante
- Chivirico Dávila
- Oscar D'León

== F ==
- Roberto Faz
- Cheo Feliciano

== K ==
- Israel Kantor

== L ==
- Rolando Laserie
- Héctor Lavoe
- Pío Leyva
- La Lupe

== M ==
- Antonio Machín
- José Mangual Jr.
- Melcochita
- Meñique
- Ismael Miranda
- Monguito
- Andy Montañez
- Beny Moré

== O ==
- Eliades Ochoa

== P ==
- Guillermo Portabales
- Omara Portuondo

== Q ==
- Joe Quijano
- Ismael Quintana
- Miguel Quintana

== R ==
- Ismael Rivera
- Mon Rivera
- Pellín Rodríguez
- Tito Rodríguez
- Elliot Romero

== S ==
- Jimmy Sabater
- Gilberto Santa Rosa
- Adalberto Santiago
- Luis Angel Silva "Melón"
- Pete "El Conde" Rodríguez
- Marvin Santiago

== T ==
- Luigi Teixidor
- Roberto Torres

== V ==
- Cuco Valoy
- Miguelito Valdés
- Johnny Ventura
