= Nicky Marrero =

Puerto Rican jazz musician (born 1950)

Nicholas Jr. "Nicky" Marrero
- Born: June 17, 1950; Bronx, New York City
- Genres: Afro-Latin jazz, salsa, son cubano, boogaloo, pachanga
- Occupation: Musician
- Instruments: Timbales, drums, percussion
- Years active: 1967-present
- Labels: Tico; Fania; HighNote Records; NYPRMusic, Coco Records; Timeless Records; Columbia Records

Nicky Marrero (born June 17, 1950, in the Bronx, New York City) is an American Latin jazz percussionist, of Puerto Rican descent best known as the timbale player in The Fania Allstars and as a recording artist during the 1970s salsa boom in New York.

== Early career ==
Nicolas "Nicky" Marrero, was born in the Bronx, New York on June 17, 1950. Better known as the wonderful timbalero Nicky Marrero, he began playing professionally at the age of 15 with Orchesta Caribe. Thereafter, he was asked by Willie Colon to join his band where he recorded “Jazzy” on the "El Malo" album.

From 1965 – 1971 he performed with Eddie Palmieri's band. In 1968 he recorded the LP Champagne with Eddie Palmieri and His Orchestra, published by the label Tico Records. In 1970 he recorded the LP Harlem River Drive with Palmieri who brought together other Latin Jazz artists Victor Vinegas, Andy Gonzales, Ronnie Cuber along with African American Funk all-stars Jermey Jemmott and Bernard Purdie."The results of this experiment [were] a deeply funky and socially conscious album, addressing issues of poverty and unemployment and general conditions of ghetto living." He has also performed and recorded with the Larry Harlow's orchestra from 1971 to 1973.

In 1974 he was asked by Jerry Masucci to join the Fania All-Stars, replacing Orestes Vilató where he would record Fania's greatest hits and tour the world.

== Later career ==
He has performed and record with many artists, including Tito Puente, Machito, Ray Barretto, Mongo Santamaria, Ricardo Ray and Bobby Cruz, Celia Cruz, Orchesta Broadway, Joe Cuba, La Plata Sextet, Charanga America, Chito Velez, Ismael Miranda and Hector Lavoe, Dizzy Gillespie, Manhattan Transfer, Esther Williams, Paul Simon, Spyro Gyra, Linda Ronstadt, Joe Farrell, Esther Phillips, Carlos and Jorge Santana, Jerry Gonzales, and Jorge Dalto. He has also performed with Nelson Gonzalez, Jimmy Bosch, Willie Rodriguez, David Amram, Steely Dan, Bill Withers, Airto and Flora Moreira, Wynton Marsalis, Chico O'Farrill, Billy Cobham, Stevie Wonder, Manu Dibango, Average White Band, George Benson, and Xavier Cugat. He was also a member of Típica 73

He has also taught Latin percussion and music theory throughout New York City and abroad. During the early 1990s, he taught at The Conservatory of Rotterdam in Holland; recorded and performed with Conexion Latina and Nueva Manteca. After returning to New York, he began performing with Larry Harlow and the "Fania" Latin Legends Band. In 2008 he recorded a concert called "Live at Willie's Steak House" with Willie Rodriguez, Andy Gonzalez, Roland Guerrero and Richy Mely.

== Discography ==
- El Malo (Fania, 1968)
- The Hustler (Fania, 1968)
- Champagne (1968, Tico Records)
- Live at the Red Garter Vol.1 · 1968 (Fania, 1968)
- Live at the Red Garter Vol.2 · 1968 (Fania, 1968)
- Live at the Cheetah, Volume 1 · 1971 (Fania, 1971)
- Live at the Cheetah, Volume 2 · 1971 (Fania, 1971)
- Our Latin Thing (40th Anniversary Limited Edition) · 1971 (Fania, 1971)
- Salsa · 1974 (Fania, 1974)
- Salsa (Original Soundtrack Recording) · 1976 (Fania, 1974)
- Live In Africa · 1976 (Fania, 1976)
- Delicate & Jumpy · 1976 (Columbia, 1976)
- Rhythm Machine · 1977 (Columbia Records, 1977)
- En Orbita (Fania, 1977)
- Spanish Fever (Columbia Records, 1978)
- Habana Jam · 1979 (Fania, 1979)
- Cross Over · 1979 (Fania, 1979)
- Commitment · 1980 (Fania, 1980)
- California Jam · 1980 (Fania, 1980)
- Gaucho (MCA Records, 1980)
- Latin Connection · 1981 (Fania, 1981)
- Guasasa · 1989 (Fania, 1989)
- Nueva Manteca And Nicky Marrero – Afrodisia (Timeless Records, 1991)
- Bravo '97 · 1997 (Fania, 1997)
- Live in Puerto Rico · 1995 (Fania, 1995)
- Live at Willie's Steak House (NYPRMusic, 2008)

== Filmography ==
- Our Latin Thing (Fania 1972)
- Salsa (Fania, 1974)
- Celia cruz and the Fania All Stars In Africa (Fania, 1993)
- Live (Fania, 1995)
- Soul Power (2009)
- Indestructible. El alma de la salsa (Live in salsa & Salon Indien Films, 2017)
- Yo soy la Salsa (2014)

== See also ==
- Salsa
- Charanga (Cuba)
- Afro-Cuban jazz
