= Héctor Lavoe =

Puerto Rican salsa singer (1946–1993)

- Héctor Lavoe in 1967

Background information
- Also known as: El Cantante de los Cantantes (The Singer of the Singers)
- Born: Héctor Juan Pérez Martínez; September 30, 1946; Ponce, Puerto Rico
- Died: June 29, 1993 (aged 46) New York City, U.S.
- Genres: Salsa; bolero
- Occupations: Singer; songwriter
- Years active: 1965–1992
- Label: Fania
- Formerly of: Willie Colón; Fania All-Stars
- Website: www.hectorlavoe.com

Héctor Juan Pérez Martínez (September 30, 1946 – June 29, 1993), better known as Héctor Lavoe, was a Puerto Rican salsa singer. Widely regarded as one of salsa's most important and influential vocalists, Lavoe played a pivotal role in popularizing the genre throughout the 1960s, 1970s, and 1980s. His charismatic persona and artistic vision propelled him to become one of the most successful Latin music artists of all time.

Lavoe was born and raised in the Machuelo Abajo barrio of Ponce, Puerto Rico. Early in his life, he attended Escuela Libre de Música de Ponce, known today as the Instituto de Música Juan Morel Campos and, inspired by Jesús Sánchez Erazo, developed an interest in music. He moved to New York City on May 3, 1963, at the age of sixteen. Shortly after his arrival, he worked as the singer in a sextet formed by Roberto García. During this period, he performed with several other groups, including Orquesta New York, Kako All-Stars, and Johnny Pacheco's band.

In 1967, Lavoe joined Willie Colón's band as its vocalist, recording several hit songs, including "El Malo" and "Canto a Borinquen." Lavoe moved on to become a soloist and formed his own band performing as lead vocalist. As a soloist, Lavoe recorded several hits including: "El cantante" composed by Rubén Blades, "Bandolera" composed by Colón, and "Periódico de ayer", composed by Tite Curet Alonso. During this period he was frequently featured as a guest singer with the Fania All-Stars recording numerous tracks with the band.

In 1979, Lavoe became deeply depressed and sought the help of a high priest of the Santería faith to treat his drug addiction. After a short rehabilitation, he relapsed following the deaths of his father, son, and mother-in-law. These events, along with being diagnosed with HIV from intravenous drug use, drove Lavoe to attempt suicide by jumping off the 9th floor of a Condado hotel room balcony in San Juan, Puerto Rico on June 26, 1988. He survived the attempt and recorded an album before his health began failing. Lavoe died on June 29, 1993, from a complication of AIDS.

== Early life ==
Héctor was born on September 30, 1946, in Ponce, Puerto Rico, to Francisca (Pachita) Martínez and Luis Pérez, and raised in the Machuelo Abajo barrio of the city. He was inspired early in life by his musically talented family. His grandfather, Don Juan Martínez, was a singer of controversial songs, which led to physical confrontations. His uncle was well known in Ponce as a tres player. His mother Francisca, also known as Pachita, was well known by her family and townspeople for her beautiful singing voice. His father, Luis, supported his wife and eight children by singing and playing guitar with trios and big bands. He was in high demand as a guitarist for the Fiestas de Cruz celebrations and other popular religious ceremonies, and he wanted his son to receive formal musical training as a trombonist; Héctor dreamt of being a singer. Héctor was influenced by Puerto Rican singers such as Jesús Sánchez Erazo, also known as "Chuíto el de Bayamón" - one of the island's most successful folk singers, and Daniel Santos. Later in his life, he would record songs with both artists.

Héctor attended the local Juan Morel Campos Public School of Music where the first instrument he learned to play was the saxophone. His classmates included José Febles and multi-instrumentalist Papo Lucca. One of his teachers was very strict and demanded that he practice good diction and manners, and have a strong stage presence. He felt Héctor would become a superstar as a bolero singer. From the start Héctor was a star with exceptional charisma, talent, and charm. One of a kind, his unique voice, refined and with impeccable diction, demanded attention. Well on his way to becoming a popular-music vocalist, he began frequenting clubs such as Segovia, where he sang accompanied by his childhood friends, Roberto García and José Febles. At age 17, Lavoe abandoned school and sang with a ten-piece band. He moved permanently to New York on May 3, 1963, against his father's wishes, as an older brother had moved there and later died of a drug overdose. It would take many years before Héctor was able to reconcile with his father.

== Arrival in New York City ==
Upon arriving in New York he was met by his sister Priscilla. The first thing that he did was to visit El Barrio, New York's "Spanish Harlem." Héctor was disappointed by the condition of El Barrio which he had envisioned would have "fancy Cadillacs, tall marble skyscrapers, and tree-lined streets." Héctor tried to earn a living as a painter, messenger, porter and concierge.

One day he reconnected with his friend Roberto García. They began to frequent Latin music and dance clubs in the Bronx, Spanish Harlem, and Lower Manhattan. In 1965, Héctor met Russell Cohen, who fronted the New Yorkers - the band Héctor would first record with - the album Está de bala. Héctor was invited by his friend Roberto García, a fellow musician and childhood friend, to a rehearsal of a newly formed sextet. When he arrived, they were rehearsing the romantic bolero "Tus Ojos". The lead vocalist was singing off key, and as a goodwill gesture, Lavoe demonstrated how it was supposed to sound. As a result of this selfless act, the group offered him the job of lead vocalist, which he subsequently accepted.

Later in his career he joined other salsa groups including Orquesta New York, Kako All-Stars, and Johnny Pacheco's Fania All-Stars. To distinguish Héctor from other Latino singers, a former manager made him adopt Felipe Rodríguez's moniker "La Voz" ("The Voice") and turned it into a stage name, Lavoe.

In 1967, he met salsa musician and bandleader Willie Colón. Johnny Pacheco, owner of Fania Records, and as its recording musical director, suggested that Colón record with Lavoe on a track on Colón's first album El Malo. Given the good results, Colón had Lavoe record the rest of the album's vocal tracks. Willie never officially asked Lavoe to join his band, but after the recording, said to him: "On Saturday we start at 10 p.m. at El Tropicoro Club."

The album's success significantly transformed both Colón's and Lavoe's lives. Colón's band featured a raw, aggressive, all-trombone sound that was well received by salsa fans, and Lavoe complemented the style with his articulate voice, talent for improvisation, and sense of humor. The album was a massive multimillion-dollar success in France, Panama, Colombia and other countries. Héctor received instant recognition, steady work, and enough money to provide him with a comfortable lifestyle. According to Lavoe, it happened so fast he did not know how to cope with his sudden success. With the sudden fame came love and lust and experimentation with marijuana, heroin, and cocaine.

During that year, Lavoe started a romantic relationship with Carmen Castro. She became pregnant but refused to marry him because she considered him a "womanizer." Lavoe's first son, José Alberto Pérez, was born on October 30, 1968. On the night José was baptized, Héctor received a call informing him that Nilda "Puchi" Román, with whom he also had a relationship during the same period he was with Castro, was pregnant. Héctor's second son, Héctor Pérez Jr. was born on September 25, 1969. Following the birth the couple married, and at Román's request, Lavoe had only minimum contact with Castro and José Alberto during their marriage.

== Music ==
=== The Willie Colón years ===
Willie Colón and Lavoe made fourteen albums together. In late 1970, Colón and Lavoe recorded the first of two Asalto Navideño albums, featuring Puerto Rican folk songs such as Ramito's jíbaro song "Patria y Amor", renamed "Canto a Borinquen", and original compositions.

Lavoe's lack of professionalism was often balanced by an affable onstage presence, very much resembling that of a stand-up comedian. One famous incident involved a middle-aged audience member at a dance who requested a Puerto Rican Man danza from Colón's band; Lavoe responded with an insult. The requester then gave Lavoe such a beating that he almost ended up in the hospital. The request was finally honored on a later Colón record, El Juicio (The Trial), when he added a danza section to the Rafael Muñoz song "Soñando despierto", which Lavoe introduces with a deadpanned: "¡Para ti, motherflower!" - a euphemism for: "This one's for you, motherfucker!"

The Colón band had other major hits, such as "Calle Luna, Calle Sol", and the Santería-influenced “Aguanilé", a Pacheco song recorded in the studio by the band. "Mi Gente", was better known for a live version Lavoe recorded later with the Fania All Stars.

=== Lavoe goes solo ===
Héctor Lavoe "El Cantante" (1978)
A 30-second sample of "El Cantante", Lavoe's signature song.

In 1973, Willie Colón stopped touring to focus on record production and other business enterprises. Lavoe was given the opportunity to become the bandleader of his own orchestra. He and his band traveled the world on their own, and he would also be a guest singer with the Fania All-Stars for several shows. One of the group's notable performances took place in the Kinshasa province of Zaire (modern-day Democratic Republic of Congo), where the group performed at the Zaire 74 music festival as part of the activities promoting the Rumble in the Jungle, a boxing fight between Muhammad Ali and George Foreman for the heavyweight championship of the World Boxing Council and World Boxing Association.

The Fania All-Stars recorded several of its tracks during live concerts. Lavoe was part of the group when the All-Stars returned to Yankee Stadium in 1975, where the band recorded a two volume production titled Live at Yankee Stadium. The event featured the top vocalists of Fania and Vaya Records. Lavoe was included in the group along with Ismael Miranda, Cheo Feliciano, Justo Betancourt, Ismael Quintana, Bobby Cruz, Pete "El Conde" Rodriguez, Santos Colón, and Celia Cruz. Lavoe recorded songs with the band in fifteen different productions, serving as vocalist on twenty-three songs. Besides recording songs with the band, Lavoe was also present in three movies filmed and produced by Fania Records; these were: Our Latin Thing, Salsa, and Celia Cruz with the Fania All Stars: Live in Africa. His Colón-produced albums would be best sellers; cuts from these albums were hits in Puerto Rico and the rest of Latin America:

- Lavoe's recording of Tite Curet Alonso's "Periódico de Ayer" was a number-one hit on Mexican charts for four straight months. It was also a strong hit in several Caribbean countries and South America.
- As a producer, Willie Colón had Lavoe record what would become his signature song, the Ruben Blades-authored song "El Cantante" against Blades's protests (Blades wanted to record the song on his own). Blades has repeatedly acknowledged since then that Lavoe raised his song to classic status and that Lavoe's performance was much better than what he would accomplish with it.
- In 1975, on his La Voz Album, Lavoe did a cover of Chappottin Y Sus Estrellas 1957 song “Rompe Saragüey”, which became a major success.
- The Lavoe song "Bandolera" was a strong seller in Puerto Rico, despite vigorous protests from Puerto Rican feminists about its lyrics and soneos - Lavoe twice offers the song's subject a beating.
- Lavoe's recording of the classic Cuban song by Eliseo Grenet based on Cuban poet Nicolás Guillén's poem "Sóngoro Cosongo", set to salsa music, was another major hit.
- The controversial jíbaro song "Joven Contra Viejo" featured Lavoe and Daniel Santos settling their age-based differences on stage not without a heavy dose of humor and, yet again, Yomo Toro's cuatro music as a backdrop. Another major Christmas hit on Billboard top hits in the tropical genre in 1979 includes a song from singer/composer Miguel Poventud "Una Pena En La Navidad" from the same album titled Feliz Navidad.
- Lavoe's final hit, "El Rey de la Puntualidad" (The King of Punctuality), is a humorous takeoff on Lavoe's constant tardiness and occasional absenteeism from shows. Lavoe followed the Santeria priest's advice and cut all communication with his family and friends for a period of two months. Following this recording, Héctor reappeared confident and apparently free of his drug addiction.

== Last years and death ==
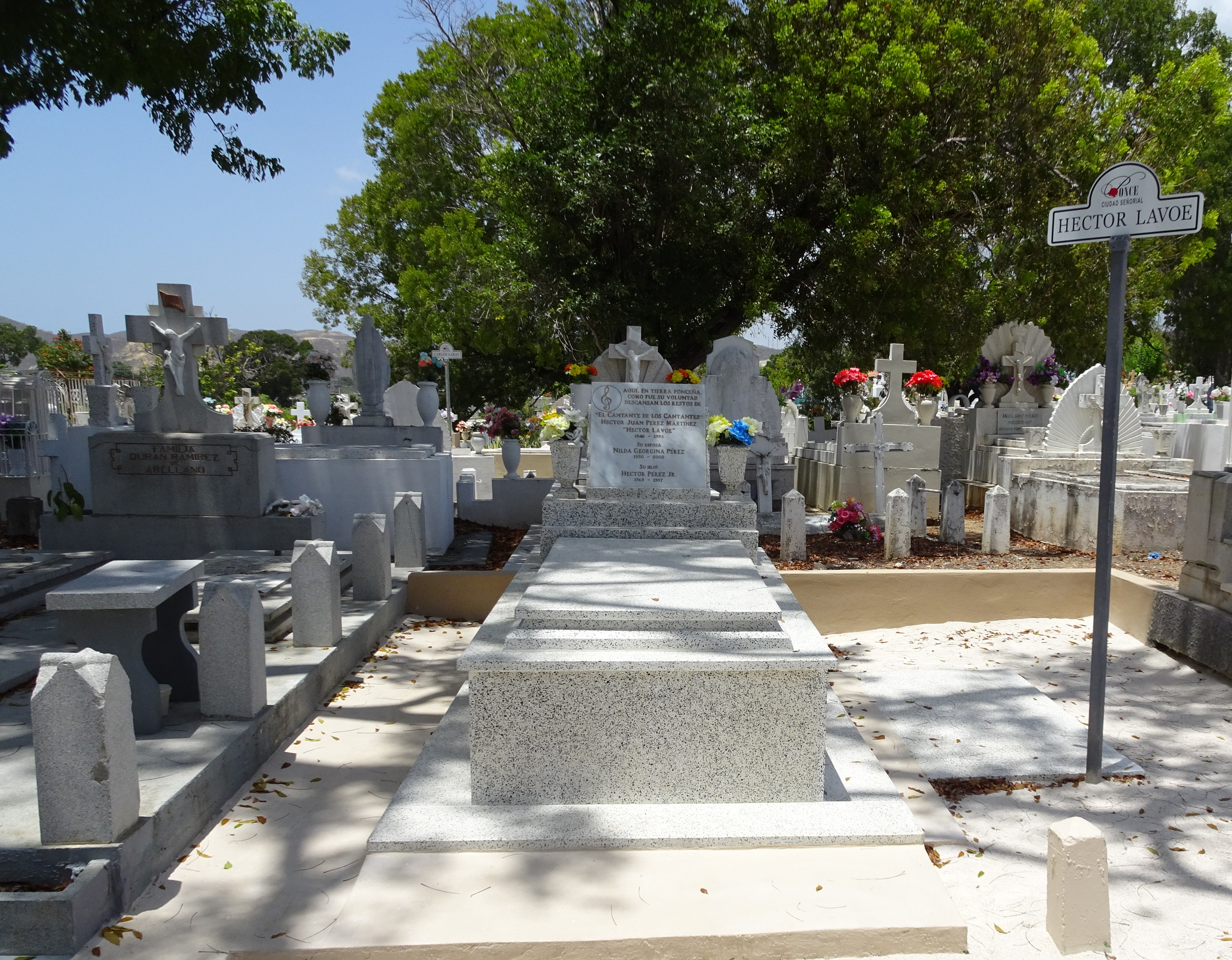
Lavoe's grave at Cementerio Civil de Ponce, Bo. Portugués Urbano, Ponce.

Following his rehabilitation, Lavoe's life was plagued by tragic events, emotional turmoil, and pain. In 1987, his seventeen-year-old son Héctor Jr. was accidentally shot and killed by a friend. In the same period, his apartment in Rego Park, Queens, was destroyed in a fire. One year later, Héctor was scheduled to perform at the Rubén Rodríguez Coliseum in Bayamón, Puerto Rico, on the night of Saturday, June 25, 1988. Sales for the concert were poor, and promoter Rick Sostre decided to cancel the concert two hours before concert time. Héctor, defiant to the end, and knowing that it would be one of the last times he would perform in Puerto Rico, decided, against the promoter's wishes, to perform for the public, who had paid to see the concert. The next day, Sunday, June 26, 1988, Héctor attempted suicide by jumping off the ninth floor of the Regency Hotel Condado in San Juan, Puerto Rico. He survived the attempt, but from that day forward, would never completely recover.

On September 2, 1990, Héctor gave his last large, public performance with the Fania All Stars at the Meadowlands in New Jersey. It was meant to be his comeback concert, but Héctor could only sing a few notes of his famous song "Mi Gente". It is believed his final public performance was a brief appearance at the club S.O.B.'s in New York City, in April 1992.

On June 29, 1993, Héctor died at Saint Clare's Hospital (Manhattan) from a complication from AIDS. He was 46. He was initially buried in Saint Raymond's Cemetery in the Bronx. In June 2002, the remains of Lavoe and his son were exhumed at his family's request and reburied in his native Ponce, along with his widow Nilda who had died a few weeks before. His remains are at the Cementerio Civil de Ponce (Ponce Civil Cemetery), in the city's Portugués Urbano neighborhood.

== Recognition ==
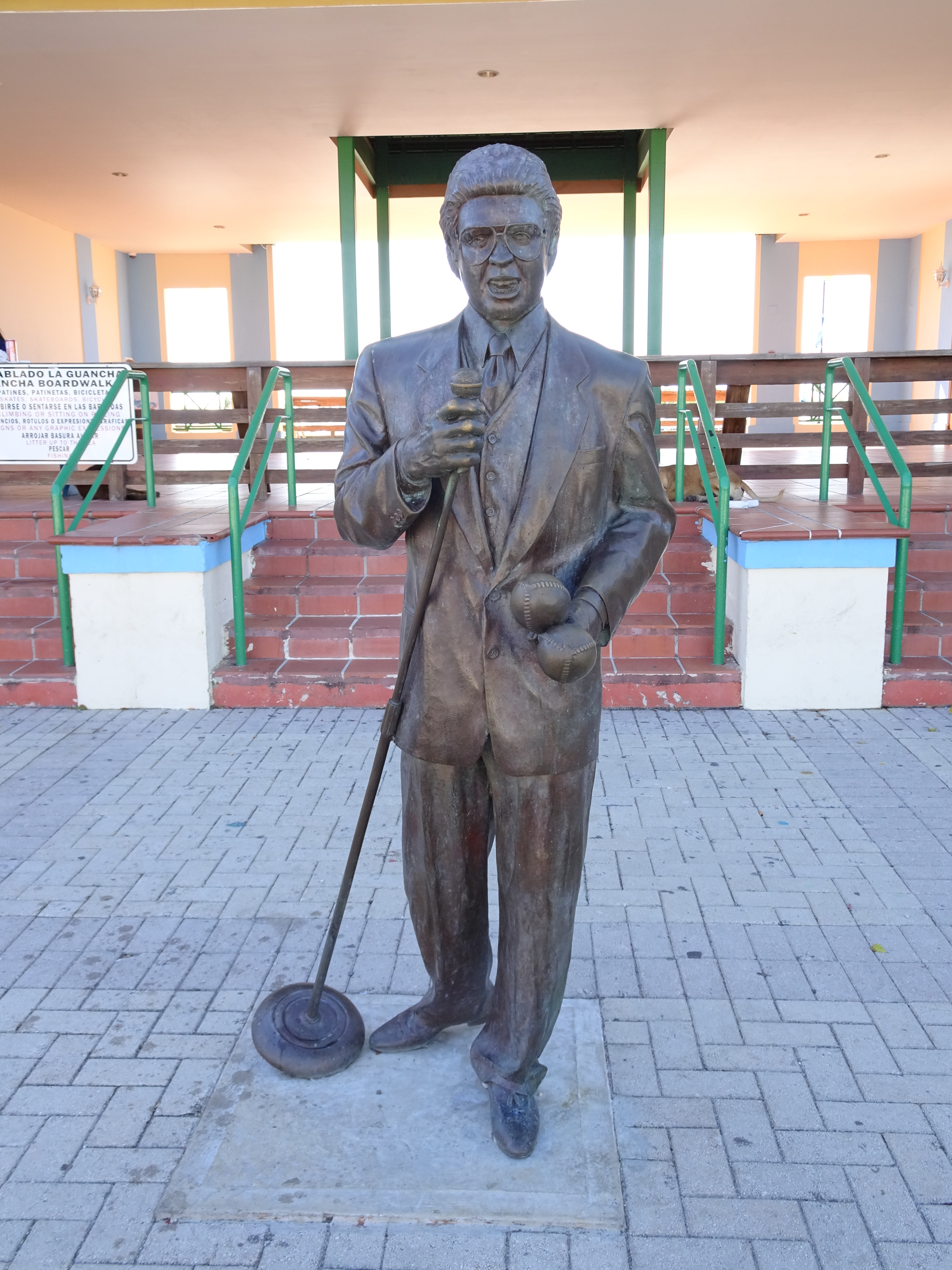
Lavoe's statue in Paseo Tablado La Guancha, Ponce, Puerto Rico.

Lavoe's life has inspired two biographical films. The first, El Cantante, was produced by salsa artist Marc Anthony, who played Lavoe, and Jennifer Lopez as Hector's wife, Nilda (known as "Puchi" by close friends). Salsa singer La India also began production of her own biopic of Lavoe's life, titled The Singer, with actor and singer Raulito Carbonell in the lead role. Production was suspended in August 2008 after the director, Anthony Felton, reported that it was over budget. Carbonell noted that he would reconsider his involvement if production were to resume. The movie was eventually completed, in 2011, as "Lavoe: The Untold Story".

An Off-Broadway production based on Lavoe's life titled ¿Quién mató a Héctor Lavoe? (Who Killed Hector Lavoe?) was a success in the late 1990s. It starred singer Domingo Quiñones in the lead role. Carbonell's decision to distance himself from the film directed by Felton was the direct result of his involvement in a tour of Quien Mato a Héctor Lavoe? in Puerto Rico, and, depending upon negotiations, possibly Peru and Colombia. An urban tribute album was released in late 2007 performed by several reggaeton artists such as Don Omar which sampled Lavoe's voice.

In Ponce, he is recognized at the Park for the Illustrious Ponce Citizens. Lavoe was posthumously inducted into the International Latin Music Hall of Fame in 2000.

La Guancha Recreational and Cultural Complex in his hometown of Ponce, Puerto Rico, honored Hector with a statue. The $60,000 statue is 2 meters (6 1/2 feet) tall, weighs 1 ton and portrays Lavoe with a microphone in his right hand and a pair of maracas in his left.

Tremont Avenue in the New York City's Bronx borough was renamed in his honor and remembrance.

In 2023, Rolling Stone ranked Lavoe at number 73 on its list of the 200 Greatest Singers of All Time.

== Discography ==
=== Studio albums ===
As vocalist of the Willie Colón Orchestra

- El Malo (1967)
- The Hustler (1968)
- Guisando (1969)
- Cosa Nuestra (1970)
- La Gran Fuga (1971)
- Asalto Navideño (1971)
- El Juicio (1972)
- Lo Mato (1973)
- Asalto Navideño, Vol. 2 (1973)
- The Good, the Bad, the Ugly (1975)

As soloist

- La Voz (1975)
- De Ti Depende (1976)
- Comedia (1978)
- Recordando a Felipe Pirela (1979)
- Feliz Navidad (1979) (with Daniel Santos & Yomo Toro)
- El Sabio (1980)
- Que Sentimiento (1981)
- Vigilante (1983) (with Willie Colón)
- Revento (1985)
- Strikes Back (1987)
- The Master & The Protege (1993), with Van Lester (posthumous album, completed with sound-alike Van Lester)

=== Other albums ===
With Tito Puente

- Homenaje a Beny Moré, Vol. II (1979)
  - song: "Donde Estabas Tú"
- Homenaje a Beny Moré, Vol. III (1985)
  - song: "Tumba Tumbador"

With the Fania All Stars

- Live at the Red Garter, Vol. 2 (1968)
  - song: "Noche" with Pete "El Conde" Rodríguez, Ismael Miranda, & Adalberto Santiago.
- Live at the Cheetah, Vol. 1 (1972)
  - song: "Quítate Tu" with: Adalberto Santiago, Ismael Miranda, Pete "El Conde" Rodriguez, Santos Colon and Johnny Pacheco.
- Live at the Cheetah, Vol. 2 (1972)
  - song: "Que Barbaridad" with Ismael Miranda.
- Our Latin Thing (Nuestra Cosa), Original Sound Track Recording (1972)
  - song: "Quítate Tu" with: Adalberto Santiago, Ismael Miranda, Pete "El Conde" Rodríguez, Santos Colon and Johnny Pacheco.
- Fania All Stars: Live at Yankee Stadium, Vol. 1 (1975)
  - song: "Mi Gente" recorded live at the inauguration concert of Roberto Clemente Coliseum, San Juan, Puerto Rico 1974.
- Fania All Stars: Live at Yankee Stadium, Vol. 2 (1975)
  - song: "Congo Bongo" with Cheo Feliciano. Recorded live at the inauguration concert of Roberto Clemente Coliseum, San Juan, Puerto Rico 1974.
- Salsa, Original Motion Picture Sound Track Recording (1976)
  - song: "Mi Gente" recorded live at the inauguration concert of Roberto Clemente Coliseum, San Juan, Puerto Rico 1974.
- Tribute To Tito Rodríguez (1976)
  - songs: "Cuando, Cuando, Cuando" and "Vuela La Paloma" with Santos Colon, Ismael Quintana, Ismael Miranda, Justo Betancourt, Bobby Cruz, Pete "El Conde" Rodríguez & Cheo Feliciano.
- Fania All Stars Live (1978)
  - song: "Saca Tu Mujer" with Ismael Quintana, Santos Colon, Ismael Miranda, Cheo Feliciano, Celia Cruz & Justo Betancourt. Recorded live at Madison Square Garden, New York, United States.
- Habana Jam (1979)
  - song: "Mi Gente / Barbarazo" with Wilfrido Vargas. Recorded live at Karl Marx Theater, Havana Cuba, 3 March 1979.
- Commitment (1980)
  - song: "Ublabadu".
- Latin Connection (1981)
  - song: "Semilla de Amor".
- Lo Que Pide La Gente (1984)
  - songs: "El Rey De La Puntualidad", "Por Eso Yo Canto Salsa" and "Usando El Coco" with Cali Aleman, Ismael Quintana, Ismael Miranda, Adalberto Santiago, Pete "El Conde" Rodríguez & Celia Cruz.
- Viva La Charanga (1986)
  - songs: "Me Voy Pa' Morón", "Isla Del Encanto" & "Guajira Con Tumbao" with Ismael Miranda, Pete "El Conde" Rodríguez and Cali Aleman.
- Bamboleo (1988)
  - song: "Siento".

Lavoe also sang chorus on three songs of Mon Rivera's album with Willie Colón, There Goes The Neighborhood (1974), and in the song "Las Cadenas de Chuíto" on Jesús Sanchez Erazo's album Música Jíbara para las Navidades (1978).

== Filmography ==
Films

- Our Latin Thing (1972)
- Salsa (1976)
- The Last Fight (1983)
- Live In Africa (1986)

== See also ==
- List of Puerto Ricans
- List of Puerto Rican songwriters
- Music of Puerto Rico
