= La Voz (album) =

Studio album by Héctor Lavoe
- Released: 1975
- Studios: Good Vibrations Sound Studios, New York City, New York, U.S.
- Genres: salsa, bolero, son montuno
- Length: 33:08
- Label: Fania
- Producer: Willie Colón

Héctor Lavoe chronology
The Good, the Bad, the Ugly (1975)	La Voz (1975)	De Ti Depende (1976)

La Voz (The Voice) is the debut solo album by Héctor Lavoe, It was released in 1975 under the label of Fania Records. It had two major hits in Latin America and United States: "El Todopoderoso" and "Mi Gente".

== Chart performance ==
Upon its release in late 1975, La Voz achieved significant commercial success in regional United States Latin music markets. Driven by the popularity of the lead singles "El Todopoderoso" and "Mi Gente," the album entered the Billboard Latin LPs chart, appearing as a high-ranking record in the November 15, 1975 issue.

The album maintained a steady charting presence through the winter of 1976. Supported by persistent regional airplay and strong sales, La Voz was eventually certified gold by Fania Records, establishing Lavoe as a commercially successful solo artist independent of his previous partnership with Willie Colón.

=== Weekly charts ===
Chart (1975–1976)	Peak position
US Latin LPs (Billboard)	2

== Critical reception ==
Professional ratings
Review scores
Source	Rating
Jazzwise	5/5 stars
All About Jazz	4/5 stars
Rate Your Music	4.05/5

Upon its release in 1975, La Voz received widespread critical acclaim and is considered a defining masterpiece of the 1970s salsa golden era. Music critics praised Héctor Lavoe's transition to a solo artist, highlighting his improvisational skills and expressive vocal range.

In a retrospective review for AllMusic, critic Evan C. Gutierrez awarded the album four out of five stars, noting that on the opening track "El Todopoderoso," Lavoe distinguished himself from his contemporaries by virtue of his "angelic timbre". Gutierrez further remarked that the record achieved a level of "warmth and refinement" that cemented Lavoe's standing as one of New York salsa's most distinctive voices. He also praised Willie Colón's vocal-centric production, which focused tightly on framing Lavoe's performances by omitting overly lengthy percussion or instrumental solos.

Following its modern audiophile vinyl reissues, the album experienced a resurgence of critical analysis. Writing for Jazzwise, reviewer Jane Cornwell gave the album 5 out of 5 stars, hailing Lavoe as the definitive interpreter of salsa and praising the record's "nuanced tunes." Similarly, All About Jazz lauded the album's enduring legacy, noting that the rich, analog production captured a timeless percussive drive and established Lavoe as a premier solo vocalist on the Fania Records roster.

== Track listing ==
All songs arranged by Willie Colon unless noted otherwise.

Side A
No.	Title	Lyrics	Composer(s)	Length
1.	"El Todopoderoso"	Hector Lavoe, Willie Colon		4:20
2.	"Emborráchame de Amor"	Mario Cavagnaro		2:57
3.	"Paraíso de Dulzura"	Hector Lavoe	Jose Febles	4:33
4.	"Un Amor de la Calle"	Orlando Brito	Louie Ramirez	3:21

Side B
No.	Title	Lyrics	Composer(s)	Length
5.	"Rompe Saragüey"	Virgilio González	Jose Febles	6:31
6.	"Mucho Amor"	Roberto Garcia		2:08
7.	"Tus Ojos"	José Luis Delgado Pérez	Louie Ramirez	3:33
8.	"Mi Gente"	Hector Lavoe, Willie Colon	Johnny Pacheco	5:29
Total length:				33:08

== Personnel ==
Credits adapted from the album's liner notes.

Musicians

- Héctor Pérez – lead vocals
- Willie Colón - backing vocals
- Rubén Blades – backing vocals
- Willie García – backing vocals
- Mark Dimond – piano
- Nicky Marrero – timbales
- Tom Malone – trombone
- José Rodríguez – trombone
- Ray Maldonado – trumpet solo on "Mi Gente"
- Héctor Zarzuela – trumpet solo on "Rompe Saragüey"
- Milton Cardona – congas
- José Mangual, Jr. – bongo
- Eddie "Gua-gua" Rivera – bass

Production

- Willie Colón – producer
- Jon Fausty – recording engineer

Artwork

- Lee Marshall – photography
