= Héctor Lavoe (statue) =

Statue of salsa singer in Ponce, Puerto Rico

Statue of Héctor Lavoe
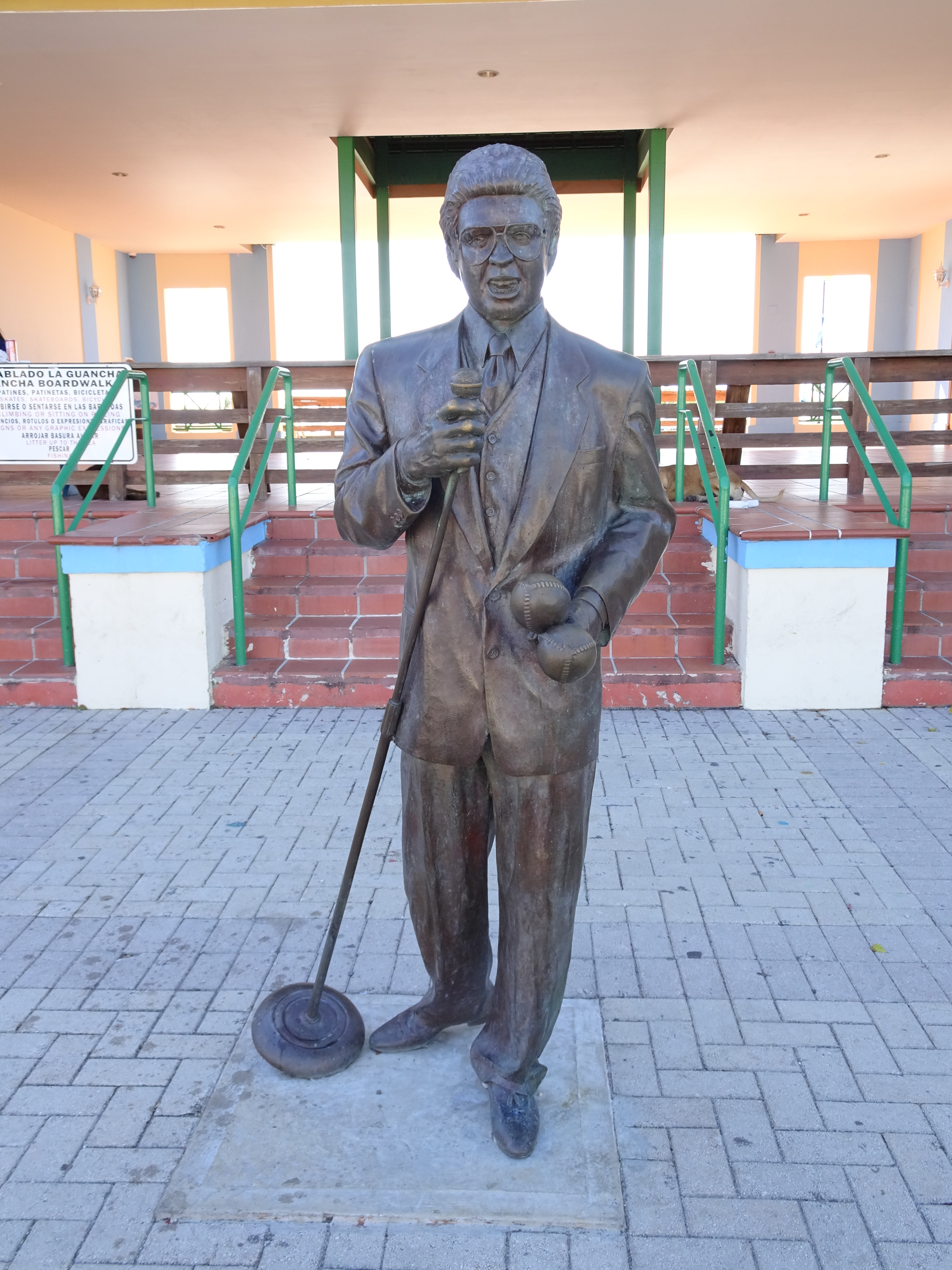

- Location of the statue within Puerto Rico
- Artist: Severo Romero (Ponce, Puerto Rico)
- Year: 2014
- Type: Bronze
- Medium: Bronze
- Dimensions: 2 m (79 in)
- Weight: 1 ton
- Condition: Pristine
- Location: La Guancha Barrio Playa, Ponce; 17°57′55.1514″N 66°36′52.2″W
- Owner: Municipality of Ponce, PR

Héctor Lavoe is a 6-foot tall bronze statue dedicated to the memory of salsa singer Héctor Lavoe who reached his professional height during the 1970s. The bronze statue is located at the sea-front recreational complex Complejo Recreativo y Cultural La Guancha in Barrio Playa, Ponce, Puerto Rico. The statue is the work of Puerto Rican artist Severo Romero and was unveiled in 2014.

== Background ==
Héctor Lavoe (1946 – 1993) was a Puerto Rican salsa singer. He was known as "El Cantante de los Cantantes" (The Singer of Singers). From a young age, he developed an interest in music and attended the Ponce Free School of Music, known today as the Instituto de Música Juan Morel Campos. In 1963, he moved to New York City, at the age of sixteen. Shortly after his arrival to New York City, he worked as the singer in a sextet formed by Roberto García. During this period, he also performed with several other groups, including Orquesta New York, Kako All-Stars, and the Johnny Pacheco band. In 1967, Lavoe joined Willie Colón's band as its vocalist, recording several hit songs, including "El Malo" and "Canto a Borinquen". Lavoe became a soloist and formed his own band performing as lead vocalist. As a soloist, Lavoe recorded several hits including: "El cantante", "Bandolera" and "Periódico de ayer". He was frequently featured as a guest singer with the Fania All Stars, recording numerous tracks with the band. In 2000, he was inducted into the International Latin Music Hall of Fame.

== Description ==
The idea of creating a statue to his honor started since 2002, when the remains of the singer were moved to Ponce to be interred at Cementerio Civil de Ponce. A "Comité Pro Monumento a Héctor Lavoe" (Committee Pro Hector Lavoe Monument) was created to head the planning and building effort and donations were received. The bulk of the money for the statue came from donations from $1 to $20 given by the public at large. It was unveiled on 1 June 2014.

The statue is the product of the Puerto Rican sculptor from Ponce, Severo Romero. It was built at a cost of $60,000. Its height is 2 meters and it weighs 1 ton. The statue presents the singer with a microphone on his right hand and a pair of maracas on his left hand. Artistically, the sculpture is a true-life depiction of the subject measuring, for example, six feet high. It is made in bronze.
