= The Hustler (album) =

1968 studio album by Willie Colón

Studio album by Willie Colón and Héctor Lavoe
- Released: 1968
- Recorded: 1968
- Studio: La Tierra Sound Studios
- Genre: Salsa, Bolero, Pachanga, Boogaloo
- Length: 36:10
- Language: Spanish
- Label: Fania Records
- Producer: Johnny Pacheco
- Compiler: Sony Music Entertainment, Universal Music Group, Fania Récords

Willie Colón and Héctor Lavoe chronology
El Malo (1967)	The Hustler (1968)	Guisando (1969)

Professional ratings
Review scores
Source	Rating
AllMusic	2.5/5 stars
The Encyclopedia of Popular Music	3/5 stars

The Hustler is the second studio album by Willie Colón and Héctor Lavoe. Released in 1968 by Fania Récords, the album is the first to list the popular Bolero Que Lio, which would go on to play a significant role in Marc Anthony's album El Cantante and, later, Anthony's movie of the same name.

== Cover ==
The image of Willie posing in front of a pool table on the cover is a reference to the 1961 film The Hustler featuring Paul Newman and Jackie Gleason. The photo was shot at Jerry Masucci's father's Ridgewood Grove Billiards in Yonkers, New York.

== Track listing ==
1. "The Hustler" Colón – 6:29
2. "Que Lío" Cuba, Lavoe, Colón – 4:35
3. "Montero" Colón, Lavoe – 4:20
4. "Se Acaba Este Mundo" Colón – 4:15
5. "Guajirón" Dimond – 5:59
6. "Eso Se Baila Así" Colón – 5:15
7. "Havana" Colón – 6:37

== Personnel ==
- Congas, Main Personnel - Hector "Bucky" Andrade
- Main Personnel, Trombone - Joe Santiago
- Main Personnel, Piano - Markolino Dimond
- Main Personnel, Timbales - Nicky Marrero
- Bongos, Main Personnel - Pablo Rosario
- Bajo Sexto, Main Personnel - Santiago Ortega Gonzalez
- Main Personnel, Primary Artist, Trombone - Willie Colón
