= El Malo (album) =

Debut album by Willie Colón at age 17

Studio album by Willie Colón
- Released: 1967
- Recorded: 1966
- Genre: Boogaloo
- Length: 27:55
- Label: Fania
- Producers: Jerry Masucci and Johnny Pacheco

Willie Colón chronology
El Malo (1967)	The Hustler (1968)

Professional ratings
Review scores
Source	Rating
AllMusic	3/5 stars
The Encyclopedia of Popular Music	3/5 stars
MusicHound World	3.5/5 stars

El Malo (English for The Bad) is the debut album of Willie Colón, recorded when he was sixteen years old. The cover design featured a double photo of Colón. 21-year-old Héctor Lavoe was brought on board by the producers. The title track featured in the soundtrack on the video game Grand Theft Auto: Vice City Stories on the fictitious Latin music radio station "Radio Espantoso".

== Track listing ==
1. "Jazzy" Colón - 4:00
2. "Willie Baby" Colón - 2:46
3. "Borinquen" Public Domain - 3:15
4. "Willie Whopper" Colón - 2:40
5. "El Malo" Colón - 3:57
6. "Skinny Papa" Colón - 4:00
7. "Chonqui" Brewster, Colón - 4:07
8. "Quimbombo" Brewster, Colón - 5:00

== Personnel ==
- Willie Colón – first trombone
- Joe Santiago – trombone
- Nick Marrero – timbales
- Mario Galagarza – conga
- Pablo Rosario – bongos
- Dwight Brewster – piano
- Eddie Guagua – bass
- James Taylor – bass
- Héctor Lavoe – vocals
- Yayo El Indio – vocals
- Elliot Romero – vocals
- Johnny Pacheco – recording director
- Jerry Masucci – producer
- Irvin Greenbaum – audio engineer
- Irv Elkin – cover photo
- Shelly Schreiber – cover design
