= Guisando =

Guisando may refer to:

- Bulls of Guisando, a set of celtiberian sculptures located on the hill of Guisando in the municipality of El Tiemblo, Ávila, Spain.
- Guisando, Ávila, a small municipality neighbouring the municipality of El Tiemblo in the province of Ávila, Castile and León, Spain.
- Guisando (album) (literally "cooking"), 1969 salsa album by Willie Colón
