= El Malo =

El Malo may refer to:

- El Malo (album), a 1967 album by Willie Colón, or the title song
- El Malo (song), a 2010 single by Aventura
- El Malo, a song by Jesse & Joy, from the album Un Besito Más
- El Malo, a song by Eladio Carrión, from the album Sol María
