= Guisando (album) =

1969 studio album by Willie Colón

Studio album by Willie Colón
- Released: 1969
- Genre: post-Boogaloo, salsa
- Label: Fania Records
- Producer: Jerry Masucci

Willie Colón chronology
The Hustler (1968)	Guisando (1969)	Cosa Nuestra (1969)

Professional ratings
Review scores
Source	Rating
AllMusic	3/5 stars
The Encyclopedia of Popular Music	3/5 stars
MusicHound World	3.5/5 stars

Guisando (literally "cooking up a stew") is the third studio album of Willie Colón & Héctor Lavoe issued in 1969 by Fania Records. Guisando was the first Colón-Lavoe album in which they shared the credits and the album cover. The track, “I Wish I Had A Watermelon” is a response to the 1962 instrumental "Watermelon Man" by Herbie Hancock. The term “guisando” in Puerto Rico, among other meanings, is a slang term to signify making quick money usually informally or not in a legit fashion. The cover of the album implies that as Lavoe is counting money while Colon holds a gun, a safe appears to have been broken with the tools above it.

== Track listing ==
1. "Guisando" (Willie Colón & Héctor Lavoe) – 4:00
2. "No Me Den Candela" (Willie Colón) – 7:05
3. "El Titán" (Willie Colón & Héctor Lavoe) – 5:21
4. "Oiga Señor" (Willie Colón & Héctor Lavoe) – 3:30
5. "I Wish I Had a Watermelon" (Willie Colón) – 5:18
6. "Te Están Buscando" (Mark Dimond) – 7:30
7. "Se Baila Mejor" (Willie Colón) – 4:20

== Personnel ==
- Composer, Primary Artist, Vocals - Héctor Lavoe
- Art Direction - Izzy Sanabria
- Producer - Jerry Masucci
- Recording Director - Johnny Pacheco
- Composer - Mark Diamond
- Original Cover Photography - Marty Topp
- Cover Design - Walter Velez
- Composer, Primary Artist, Trombone, Vocals - Willie Colón
