= Papo Lucca =

Puerto Rican musician

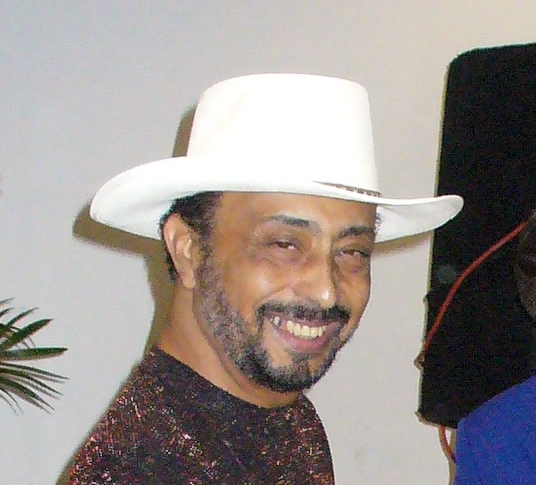

Background information
- Born: Enrique Arsenio Lucca Quiñones; April 10, 1946 (age 80); Ponce, Puerto Rico
- Genres: Salsa and Latin Jazz
- Occupation: Musician
- Instrument: multi-instrumentalist
- Years active: 1954-present
- Labels: Fania, Inca Records

Enrique Arsenio Lucca Quiñones (born April 10, 1946) better known as Papo Lucca, is a Puerto Rican multi-instrumentalist best known for his pianist skills. His main musical genres are Salsa and Latin Jazz. He is the co-founder with his father Don Enrique "Quique" Lucca Caraballo of the Puerto Rican band La Sonora Ponceña. He has also played and recorded with the Fania All-Stars, Hector Lavoe, Willie Colón, Celia Cruz, Johnny Pacheco, Bobby Valentín, Ismael Quintana, Gloria Estefan, Adalberto Santiago, Andy Montañez, Pablo Milanés, and Rubén Blades. He is also a well-known music arranger.

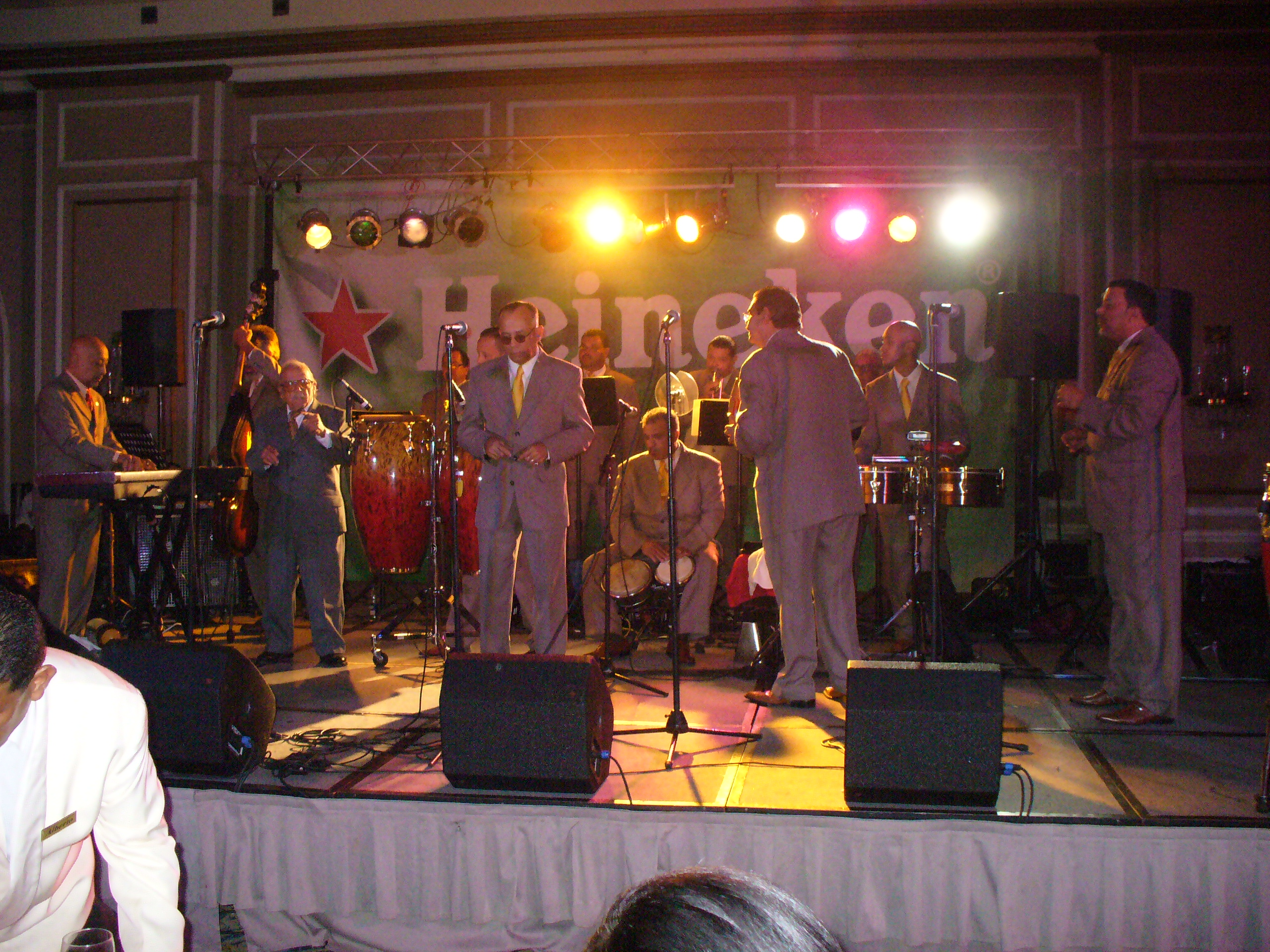
Papo Lucca's La Sonora Ponceña (2007)

== Biography ==
Lucca Quiñones was born in Ponce, Puerto Rico on 10 April 1946. His father was Enrique Quique Lucca.

Papo Lucca is married to Mirriam and they have children. In June 2020, their eldest son died of complications due to diabetes.

== Career ==
With his dynamic piano playing and unique approach to salsa, Papo Lucca has led his band, La Sonora Ponceña, to the forefront of Latin music. Inheriting the group from his father, Lucca has continued to inspire La Sonora Ponceña with his innovative playing. While Rubén Blades called Lucca, "the best pianist in the world", Cuban pianist Ruben González explained, "of non-Cuban pianists, I most admire [Lucca] because his salsa is very close to son. Son piano is more varied than salsa piano which is more formulaic and holds on to a single riff much longer."

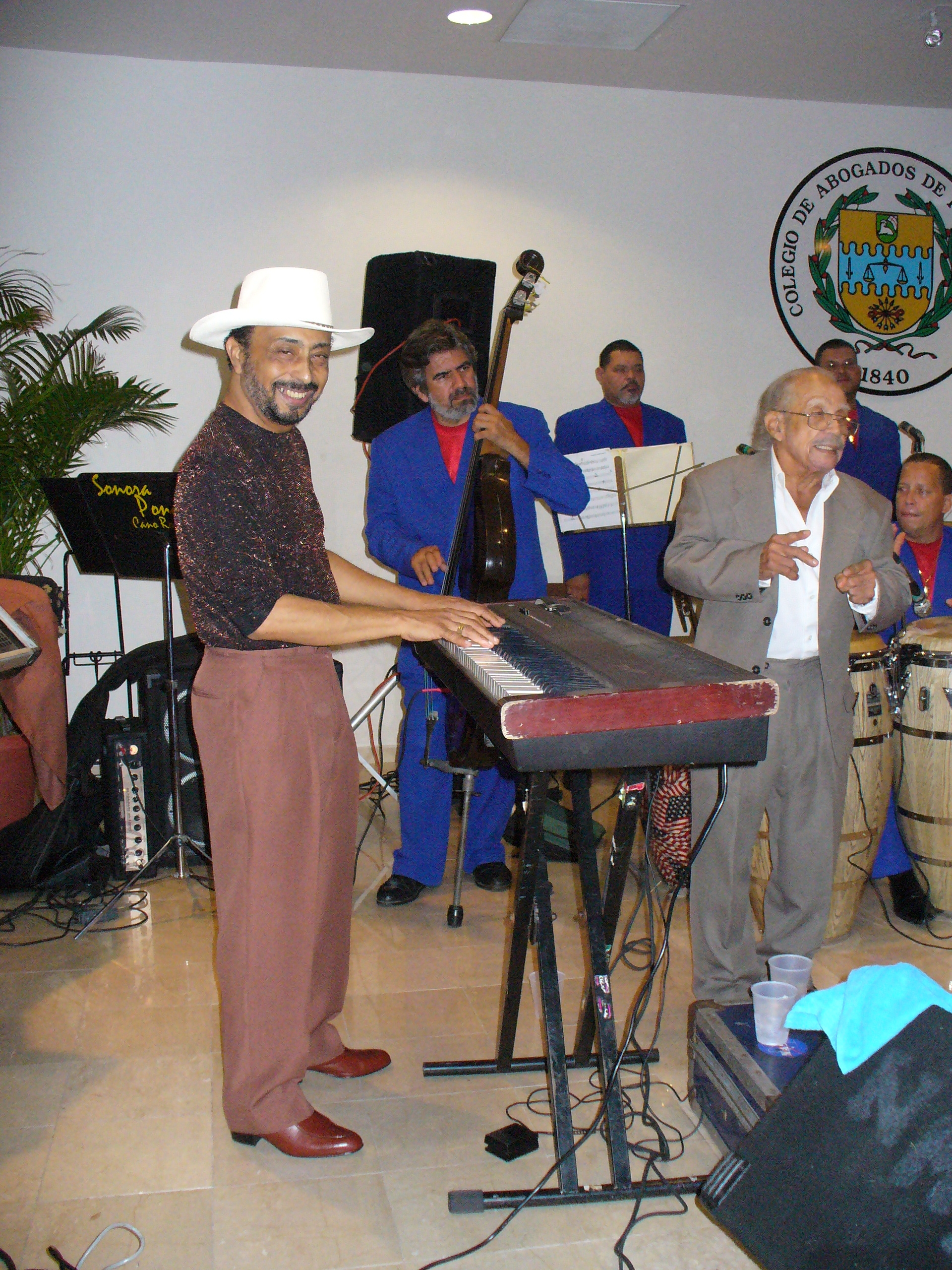
Papo Lucca, playing piano with La Sonora Ponceña; his father Quique Lucca stands next to him (2006)

Lucca has been involved with music most of his life. A native of Ponce, a city on the southern coast of Puerto Rico, he began studying at the city's Free School of Music at the age of six. In addition to being trained in solfeggio, he studied piano, clarinet, saxophone, and Music theory. A month after he enrolled in the school, he performed a classical piece on a local radio station. Lucca simultaneously studied privately with pianist Ramón Fernández. With his father's encouragement, Lucca advanced quickly. Performing with La Sonora Ponceña at the age of eight, he made his recording debut three years later, when the group accompanied bolero vocalists Felipe Rodriguez and Davilita on their album, Al Compas De Las Sonoras. At the age of fourteen, Lucca began an "official" member of La Sonora Ponceña.

Throughout the 1950s, Lucca remained active as a musician. In addition to playing solo piano on a television show hosted by Ruth Fernández, he recorded with Obdulio Morales, Orquestra Panamerica, and Machito. Despite his busy schedule, Lucca found time to continue his formal studies. Graduating from the University of Puerto Rico, he went on to study at the Puerto Rico Conservatory of Music. His first opportunity to showcase his talents came in 1976 when he co-produced La Sonora Ponceña's album, Musical Conquest/Conquista Musical, with Louie Ramirez. Two years later, he produced the group's album, Explorando, on his own. Although he's remained committed to Sonora Ponceña, Lucca has balanced his involvement with a variety of outside projects. In 1976, he replaced pianist Larry Harlow in the Fania All-Stars. He continued to perform with the group until the mid-1990s.

Lucca reached a professional high in 1979. Together with La Sonora Ponceña, he collaborated with influential Latin vocalist Celia Cruz on an album, La Ceiba, and appeared with Cruz in a television documentary, Salsa. The same year, he performed on an album, Habana Jam, along with the Fania All-Stars, which was recorded during a concert in Cuba. Lucca also recorded a solo piano album, Latin Jazz, in 1993.

In 2014, Lucca and La Sonora Ponceña played at Lehman Center for the Performing Arts in New York to commemorate their 60-year anniversary.

He ranks with the late Charlie Palmieri, as one of the best piano instrumentalists in Latin Jazz and Salsa.

== Discography ==
=== With Sonora Ponceña ===
- Al Compás de las Sonoras Felipe y Davilita (1954)
- Hacheros Pa' Un Palo (1968)
- Fuego en el 23! (1969)
- Algo de Locura (1971)
- Navidad Criolla (1971)
- De Puerto Rico a New York (1972)
- Sonora Ponceña (1972)
- Sabor Sureño (1974)
- Tiene Pimienta (1975)
- Conquista Musical (1976)
- El Gigante del Sur (1977)
- La Orquesta de Mi Tierra (1978)
- Explorando (1978)
- La Ceiba with Celia Cruz (1979)
- New Heights (1980)
- Unchained Force (1980)
- Night Rider (1981)
- Determination (1982)
- Future (1984)
- Jubilee (1985)
- Back To Work (1987)
- On The Right Track (1988)
- Into The 1990s (1990})
- Merry Christmas (1991)
- Guerreando (1992)
- Birthday Party (1993)
- Apretando (1995)
- On Target (1998)
- 45° Aniversario (2001)
- Back To The Road (2004)
- 50 Aniversario En Vivo Vol. 1 (2007)
- 50 Aniversario En Vivo Vol. 2 (2008)
- Otra Navidad Criolla (2008)

=== Compilations ===
- Lo Mejor de la Sonora Ponceña (1975)
- 30th Anniversary Vol. 1 (1985)
- 30th Anniversary Vol. 2 (1985)
- Soul of Puerto Rico (1993)
- Opening Doors (1994)
- Puro Sabor (2000)
- Grandes Éxitos (2002)
- Pa'l Bailador: 45 Años de Historia (2005)
- La Herencia (2007)

=== With Ismael Quintana ===
- Mucho Talento (1980)

=== Other works ===
- Celia, Justo, Johnny & Papo: Recordando el Ayer (1976)
- Puerto Rico All Stars (1976)
- Pete y Papo (1993)
- Latin Jazz (1993)
- Los Originales: Azuquita y Papo Lucca (1994)
- De Aquí Pa' Lla (1994)
- Papo, Alfredo de la Fe y Sexteto Típico de Cuba (1997)
- Papo Lucca And The Cuban-Jazz All-Stars (1998)
- Festival de Boleros (2002)

=== As member of The Fania All-Stars ===
- Delicate and Jumpy (1976)
- A Tribute to Tito Rodríguez (1976)
- Rhythm Machine (1977)
- Fania All Stars Live (1978)
- Spanish Fever (1978)
- Habana Jam (1979)
- Cross Over (1979)
- Commitment (1980)
- California Jam (1980)
- Social Change (1981)
- Latin Connection (1981)
- Lo Que Pide la Gente (1984)
- Viva la Charanga (1986)
- Bamboleo (1988)
- Guasasa (1989)
- Live in Puerto Rico June 11, 1994 (1995)
- Viva Colombia (1996)
- Bravo '97 (1997)

== Videography ==
- Fania All-Stars Live in Puerto Rico, 11 June 1994 (1995)
- Sonora Ponceña 45 Aniversario Live (2004)
- 50 Aniversario, En Vivo (2007)
