= Mon Rivera =

Puerto Rican band leader (1899–1978)

- Born: May 25, 1925; Mayagüez, Puerto Rico
- Died: March 12, 1978 (aged 53); New York City, New York, U.S.
- Occupations: Musician, Baseball Player

Mon Rivera is the common name given to two distinct Puerto Rican musicians (both born in Mayagüez), namely Ramon Rivera Alers (originally nicknamed "Don Mon", or Mon The Elder) and his oldest son, Efraín Rivera Castillo (May 25, 1925 – March 12, 1978), (referred to early in his career as "Moncito", or Little Mon, and later known by his father's moniker). This article refers mainly to Efraín Rivera Castillo, a popular band leader known in salsa, plena and Latin jazz circles.

Efraín was specifically known for salsa and a Puerto Rican style called plena. He is credited for a fast humorous style and for introducing the sound of an all-trombone brass section to Afro-Rican orchestra music.

Three of Efraín's brothers were also musicians. Efraín's son is the percussionist, Javier Rivera.

== Don Mon ==
Don Mon was born in Rio Cañas Arriba, a barrio in the outskirts of the city and municipality of Mayagüez, Puerto Rico, close to the place Eugenio María de Hostos was born) in 1899. He lived in the working class Barcelona barrio of the city proper. He was a janitor and handyman at the nearby University of Puerto Rico - Mayagüez for more than 40 years, and was well loved by the campus community. Known as "'Rate" by his closest friends, Don Mon gained a strong reputation as a composer of plenas, a musical genre considered the "musical newspaper of the barrio". He assembled impromptu plena jams in the neighborhood, which were so widely known that they were preserved for posterity in the documentary film "Plena" on YouTube (1956) by Amilcar Tirado (Don Mon appears at the last segment, improvising lyrics). At the time, don Mon was illiterate and had no formal musical training.

Two of Don Mon's most famous plenas, "Askarakatiskis" (sometimes referred to as "Karacatis Ki") and "El Gallo Espuelérico" (loosely translated as "The Spurless Rooster") were humorous takes on real life events. In the first one Don Mon tells the story of Rafael, a gambler who loses all his money rolling dice and is then assaulted by his wife Luz María with a broomstick, while their daughters laugh the incident off (one of the girls' laughter is the basis for the song's name). "El Gallo Espuelérico" tells the story of Américo, a guy who brags boastfully about a gamecock he carried with him to a fight. The bird is killed soon after the fight starts (Don Mon claimed once that the winner was his rooster "Espuelérico", although this is disputed), to the amusement of his friends, who tell him the gamecock would be more fierce as part of a chicken rice soup (in reality, they ended up eating the soup).

However, a plena standard to this day was born when seamstresses of a local handkerchief factory went on strike against the factory's owner, Lebanese industrialist William Mamary, and Mamery hired replacement workers (whom the seamstresses considered to be scabs). Don Mon wrote "Aló, ¿Quién Ñama" (loosely translated as "Hello, Who' Calling?", sometimes referred to as "Qué Será") as a musical description of the strike. Since the seamstress' strike was organized by local labor leader John Vidal, and patronized by local assemblywoman María Luisa Arcelay, they are mentioned in the song. The seamstresses are reportedly calling each other as to raise mutual concern about the poor pay they were getting. Near the end, Don Mon breaks into what his son later called "trabalenguas" (tongue twisters), which in fact is a style of scat singing where some of the syllables of the actual song are slurred nasally and delivered quickly along with the scatting. The skill was passed from father to son; Efraín became so adept at using "trabalenguas" that he eventually was called "El Rey del Trabalengua" ("The Tongue Twister King") once he became famous.

== Efraín's early days ==
Efraín's mother died when he was a little boy, and Don Mon remarried a few years after, fathering a total of twelve children. Since the family's economic situation was precarious, Efraín had to support and look after his younger brothers by taking various odd jobs. The one that he was most successful at, besides music, was as shortstop for the Indios de Mayagüez, the local winter league baseball team, for which he had been the bat boy at an earlier age. He played with them between 1943 and 1945. To this date, he still holds the league record for most triples in a game (three) and most consecutive doubles in a double-header (five).

Efraín was trained as a multi-instrumentalist: he played timbales, congas, bongos, saxophone, trumpet, trombone and bass guitar. In his beginnings as a musician, Efraín and Germán Vélez (father of Wilkins Vélez) formed El Dúo Huasteco, and sang Mexican folk songs that were popular in Latin America at the time (they even dressed the part). Santos Colon joined the duo occasionally and made it a trio. Their talent moved Gilbert Mamery to feature them as part of musical reviews staged at Mayagüez's San José Theater. Later, Mon became a percussionist and singer with various local bands, working with bandleaders Juan Ramón Delgado, better known as "Moncho Leña" and William Manzano, both of whom he persuaded to allow him to arrange some of his father's plenas for a full orchestra. A full orchestral version of "Aló, ¿Quién Ñama?" was a sleeper hit in 1954.

Efraín (by now widely called "Moncito", or "Little Mon", and later called just "Mon") began to popularize his father's plenas. One of them, "La Plena de Rafael Martinez Nadal" was written in admiration for the Puerto Rican lawyer and legislator, who was extremely successful in local courts. Another one, "Carbón de Palito", described the route followed by street vendors of wood charcoal (then used as cooking fuel) through most of Mayagüez. Almost all sections of the city at the time are mentioned in the lyrics. Both plenas were local hits, and along with Rafael Cortijo's rendition of "El Bombón de Elena", they helped to revive the genre during the late 1950s. Efraín started writing his own material just as this happened.

By the mid-1950s, Efraín was an accomplished singer in Puerto Rico, but since the island is rather small, he did as many other local performers and emigrated to New York City, as to guarantee a living playing music, given the sizeable Latino population there. When Moncho Leña's orchestra moved to New York City in November 1953, he moved along with them. He went to the extreme of arranging a plena version of "Hava Nagilah" for the Italian and Jewish clubgoers who danced to their music at New York's Palladium Ballroom. He also sang with Joe Cotto and Héctor Pellot. He was featured in the second television music special by the Banco Popular de Puerto Rico in 1960.

== Trombanga sound ==
Rivera organized his own orchestra by 1961, when he started working on his album Que gente averiguá (What nosey people), which was released in 1963. The lineup for this record included Charlie Palmieri and Eddie Palmieri on piano, Barry Rogers, Mark Weinstein, and Manolín Pazo on trombones, and Kako on percussion, among others. Like most Latino orchestras of the time, Rivera's orchestra did not play plenas exclusively. Most of Rivera's plena numbers broke into a salsa section in mid-song, and he would sing or play any genre at dances and shows. This explains his experiments mixing plena with pachanga, mambo and Dominican merengue, such as the album's title track, a song where he mocked people who openly criticized that he was a miser, recycling old clothes until they wore thin, keeping his money hidden in a barrel or wearing an old hat from his Mayagüez days down 8th Avenue in Manhattan. Cheo Feliciano admits being Efraín's roadie once around this time.

There are conflicting theories that list either Rivera or his record producer, Al Santiago, as being the inventor of the all-trombone brass section (four trombones, in this case). An early example of this is the earliest recording Rivera made of "Askarakatiskis". This led to a more aggressive, bottom-heavy sound that was a novelty at the time. The sound lent itself well to plenas but did not catch on in salsa circles until Eddie Palmieri experimented with a similar lineup almost simultaneously (Santiago produced both artists). By the end of the decade, the all-trombone brass section was part of the standard salsa vocabulary, popularized particularly by Willie Colón, who adopted it most successfully than any other bandleader.

Rivera could make a living with his orchestra, but migrating to New York had disconnected him from his fan base in Puerto Rico. Health problems including bouts with alcoholism and drug addiction, along with serving some prison time (which limited his contribution to the album Dolores, recorded with Joe Cotto and Mike Casino, and released in 1963), eventually forced a reduction in his workload causing his popularity to wane, but only temporarily.

== Mon The Younger revives his career ==
By the mid-1970s, however, Willie Colón encountered Efraín in Puerto Rico, during one of his visits to the island. At the time, Efraín was a patient at an Hogar Crea, a drug rehabilitation program local to Puerto Rico. He had become a part-time refrigeration technician. Colón, who had admired Efraín's multiple trombone sound strongly enough to model his own band after Rivera's, persuaded Efraín to record an album with him, for which he would perform and produce. The album, named Se Chavó El Vecindario/There Goes The Neighborhood, was issued by Colón's current label, Fania Records. For the album sessions, Colón assembled a solid lineup that consisted of Willie's band, as well as Rubén Blades (and in at least two songs, Héctor Lavoe) as part of the vocal chorus section. Following the release of Se Chavó, Efraín performed live with Vicky Soto on congas, Gilberto Colón on piano, Goodwin Benjamin on bass, and José Rodríguez, Marco Katz, Frankie Rosa, and Frank Figueroa on trombones.

Se Chavó became a seminal work in the history of Puerto Rican plena, essentially revived Efraín's career and made him famous in a few Latin American countries, particularly in Venezuela and the Dominican Republic. The album had three smash hits, a semi-autobiographical plena named "Ya Llegó" (written for him by fellow Puerto Rican composer and singer Felito Felix) and another called "Julia Lee", the story of a bully who terrorized San Juan's Barrio Obrero neighborhood. A third hit was a medley of "Qué Será" and "Askarakatiskis". In Puerto Rico, two additional plenas written by Tite Curet Alonso, one called "La Humanidad" ("The Humanity"), in which Tite criticizes people's pettiness that have ruined the friendship between two buddies, and "Tinguilikitín", which describes Mayagüez's old horse-pulled tram and its bell, were minor hits. Soon after his mid-1960s albums were re-released.

== Death and legacy ==
The increasing demand for his services, a relapse in his drug addiction, and his ill health combined to strike Efraín in the peak of his popularity. He died on March 12, 1978, in Manhattan, New York City, United States, of a heart attack, at the age of 53. He was soon buried in Mayagüez's Old Municipal Cemetery, gathering the second largest funeral crowd assembled in the city, second only to that of the 1993 burial procession for Benjamin Cole, the longest-serving mayor in the city's history. An impromptu plena band played his songs during the walk between the religious service and his burial place.

Fania Records released a posthumous album with unreleased tracks from the Se Chavó sessions and newer material, called Forever. The album, produced by Johnny Pacheco, granted Efraín one last hit, the rather fitting "Se Dice Gracias" (aka "¡Bravo, Mon!"). A remastered version of Se Chavó was released in May 2007.

Since Efraín died intestate, legal disputes among family members, as well as between his estate and the publishers of his songs (and his fathers') prevent most of his music to be performed publicly by Latino media. Nonetheless, both Mons have left a legacy of plena standards that are popular to this day.

Efraín was regarded as one of the best güiro players of his day (Tite Curet Alonso claimed he was only surpassed by Patricio Rijos, "Toribio", a guiro player that accompanied Puerto Rican composer Felipe Rosario Goyco, "Don Felo", and whose statue can be found at the intersection of Tanca and San Francisco streets in Old San Juan). An example of Efraín's güiro playing can be heard at the end of the first percussion solo part of "Ya llegó".

The all-trombone brass lineup, on the other hand, persists in much of Willie Colón's work, as well as in many plena bands, most notably in Puerto Rico's most successful plena band ever, Plena Libre.

In 1976, while Efraín was alive, a tribute song to him, "Cuchú Cuchá" became a sleeper hit in the Dominican Republic. The same song was later versioned by Jossie Esteban and his former group, Patrulla 15, and became a merengue hit in Puerto Rico, the Dominican Republic and New York City. Just after Efraín's death, the Puerto Rican plena collective Los Pleneros del Quinto Olivo recorded a tribute song, "¿Dónde estará Mon?" ("Where would Mon be?") that spoke fondly of Efraín (although the song did have some inaccuracies concerning him).

Celia Cruz recorded Efraín's plena "A Papá Cuando Venga" ("When Dad Comes Back", a song describing a girl's experience with sexual harassment by a neighbor from her perspective, threatening him with a beating once her dad comes back from running errands) in bomba style with Willie Colón, and had a hit with it in Puerto Rico. In the song "El Telefonito", from his 1981 album with Willie Colón Canciones del Solar de los Aburridos, Rubén Blades pays a tribute to Efraín in the 'soneos' section, parodying "Aló ¿Quien Ñama?" and its trabalengua style. So does Héctor Lavoe in the studio recording of "Mi Gente", written by Johnny Pacheco and recorded in 1973.

A street in the "Rio Hondo" section of Mayagüez is named in Efraín's honor.

== Discography ==
- A Night at The Palladium with Moncho Leña, 1956
- Dance with Moncho Leña, 1958
- Que Gente Averigua, 1963 (re-released as Mon y Sus Trombones in 1976)
- Dolores, 1963 (with Joe Cotto y su Orquesta)
- Karakatis-Ki, Vol. 1, 1964
- Kijis Konar, Vol. 2, 1965
- Mon Rivera y Su Orquesta, Vol. 3, 1966
- Se Chavó el Vecindario / There Goes the Neighborhood, 1975 (with Willie Colón)
- Forever (posthumous), 1978
- Mon y Sus Trombones, 1995
