= Fania All-Stars =

Musical group formed in 1968 as a showcase for the musicians on Fania Records

- Origin: New York City
- Genres: Salsa; descarga; bolero
- Years active: 1968–present
- Label: Fania
- Members: Johnny Pacheco†; Rubén Blades; Alfredo De La Fé; Willie Colón†; Edwin Tito Asencio; Jimmy Bosch; Pupi Legarreta; Papo Lucca; Nicky Marrero; Ismael Miranda; Adalberto Santiago; Andy Montañez; Roberto Roena†; Bobby Valentín; Bobby Cruz; Richie Ray; Luigi Texidor; Hector "Bomberito" Zarzuela; Reynaldo Jorge; Eddie Montalvo; Isidro Infante
- Past members: Ray Barretto†; Celia Cruz†; Eric Gale†; Larry Harlow†; Héctor Lavoe†; Pete "El Conde" Rodríguez†; Yomo Toro†; Cheo Feliciano†; Santos Colón†; Orestes Vilató; Barry Rogers†; Carlos Santana; Jorge Santana; Wilfrido Vargas; Ray Maldonado; Alphonse Mouzon; Juancito Torres†; Rey Ramos; Roberto Rodríguez; Ismael Quintana†; Justo Bentancourt; Sal Cuevas†; Leopoldo Pineda; Romeo Borgida; Luis "Perico" Ortiz; Eddie Benitez; Tito Puente†; Mongo Santamaria†
- Website: www.fania.com

The Fania All Stars is a musical group formed in 1968 as a showcase for the musicians on Fania Records, the leading salsa music record label of the time.

== History ==
=== Beginnings ===
In 1964, Fania Records was founded in New York City by Jerry Masucci, an Italian-American lawyer with a love for Cuban music, and Johnny Pacheco, a flutist, percussionist and bandleader born in the Dominican Republic but raised in the South Bronx who had similar musical tastes. Masucci later bought out his partner Pacheco from Fania Entertainment Group, Ltd. and was the sole owner until his death in December 1997.

Throughout the early years, Fania used to distribute its records around New York. Eventually success from Pacheco's Cañonazo recording would lead the label to develop its roster. Masucci and Pacheco, now executive negotiator and musical director respectively, began acquiring musicians such as Bobby Valentín, Larry Harlow, and Ray Barretto.

=== Success ===
In 1968, Fania Records created a continuously revolving line-up of entertainers known as the Fania All-Stars. They were considered some of the best Latin Music performers in the world at that time. The original lineup consisted of:

- Band Leaders: Ray Barretto, Joe Bataan, Willie Colon, Larry Harlow, Monguito, Johnny Pacheco, Louie Ramirez, Ralph Robles, Mongo Santamaria, and Bobby Valentin.
- Singers; Héctor Lavoe, Adalberto Santiago, Pete "El Conde" Rodríguez, and Ismael Miranda.
- Other Musicians; La La, Ray Maldonado, Ralph Marzan, Orestes Vilató, Roberto Rodriguez, Jose Rodriguez, and Barry Rogers.
- Special Guests; Tito Puente, Eddie Palmieri, Ricardo Ray and Jimmy Sabater.

They recorded Live at the Red Garter, Volumes 1 and 2 with this original lineup. On August 26, 1971, they recorded Live at the Cheetah, Volumes 1 and 2. It exhibited the entire All-Star family performing before a capacity audience in New York City's Cheetah Lounge.

Following sell-out concerts in Puerto Rico, Chicago, and Panama, the All-Stars embarked on their first appearance at New York's Yankee Stadium on August 24, 1973. The All-Stars performed before more than 40,000 spectators in a concert that featured Ray Barretto, Willie Colón, Edwin Tito Asencio, Rubén Blades, Larry Harlow, Johnny Pacheco, Roberto Roena, Pellín Rodríguez, Bobby Valentín, and Jorge Santana (younger brother of Carlos Santana), Celia Cruz, Héctor Lavoe, Cheo Feliciano, Ismael Miranda, Justo Betancourt, Ismael Quintana, Pete "El Conde" Rodríguez, Bobby Cruz and Santos Colón. Live at Yankee Stadium was included in the second set of 50 recordings in the U.S. National Recording Registry, solidifying the All-Stars as "culturally, historically, and aesthetically significant."

In 1974, the All-Stars performed in Zaire, Africa, at the 80,000-seat Stade du 20 mai in Kinshasa. This was captured on film and released as Live in Africa (Salsa Madness in the UK). This Zairean appearance occurred along with James Brown and others at a music festival held in conjunction with the Muhammad Ali/George Foreman heavyweight title fight. Footage of the performance was included in the 2008 documentary Soul Power.

To attain a wider market for salsa music, Fania made a deal with Columbia Records in the US for a series of crossover albums by the All-Stars, beginning with Delicate and Jumpy (1976), in which Steve Winwood united with the All-Stars' Pacheco, Valentin, Barreto, and Roena. During the same year, the Fania All-Stars made their sole UK appearance, at London's Lyceum Ballroom, with Winwood appearing as guest.

In 1978 the All-Stars released Live, recorded in concert on July 11, 1975, at San Juan's Roberto Clemente Coliseum. In 1979, they travelled to Havana, Cuba, to participate in the Havana Jam festival that took place between March 2–4, alongside Rita Coolidge, Kris Kristofferson, Stephen Stills, the CBS Jazz All-Stars, Trio of Doom, Billy Swan, Bonnie Bramlett, Weather Report, and Billy Joel, plus Cuban artists such as Irakere, Pacho Alonso, Tata Güines, and Orquesta Aragón. Their performance is captured on Ernesto Juan Castellanos's documentary Havana Jam '79. During the same year the All-Stars released Crossover on Columbia and Habana Jam on Fania, which came from a concert recorded in Havana on March 2.

=== Legacy ===
In 2009, a historical documentary, Latin Music USA, shown on PBS TV, featured an episode on the Fania All-Stars, their evolution, career, and later demise. In 2009 as well, the All-Stars returned to the stage, opening Carlos Santana's world tour in Bogotá, Colombia. The presentation caused mixed feelings inside the salsa circle though, mainly because they were treated as seconds by the concert's organizers.

In March 2011, and subsequently in November 2012, a limited roster of the All-Stars performed in Lima, Peru. One thing to note about the 2012 performance is the return of Ruben Blades. Ismael Quintana was not present in the November 2012 performance though, as well as Yomo Toro (Yomo died on June 30, 2012). In October 2013, a new, complete roster of the All-Stars performed in San Juan, Puerto Rico, celebrating the 40th anniversary of their first performance in San Juan. This roster included the return of Orestes Vilato and Luigi Texidor, as well as the participation of Andy Montañez, Cita Rodriguez (Pete's daughter) and Willie Colón. This was Cheo Feliciano's last performance with the All-Stars before dying in a car accident in April 2014 in San Juan, Puerto Rico. In 2015 the Fania All-Stars were chosen to receive ASCAP's honorary Latin Heritage Award. The All-Stars were set to perform in Central Park, New York City on August 24 as part of the closing ceremony of the 50th anniversary celebration of the legendary Fania Records label.

In 2019, many of the classic Fania albums were re-issued by Concord/Craft Recordings on vinyl as part of the renewed interest in the vinyl record format.

== Discography ==
=== Studio albums ===
- Delicate and Jumpy (Fania 491; Columbia 34283; Island ILPS-9447, 1976)
- Tribute to Tito Rodríguez (Fania 493, 1976)
- Rhythm Machine (Columbia 34711, 1977)
- Spanish Fever (Columbia 35336, 1978)
- Cross Over (Columbia 36109, 1979)
- Commitment (Fania 564, 1980)
- California Jam (Fania 583, 1980)
- Social Change (Fania 594, 1981)
- Latin Connection (Fania 595, 1981)
- The Last Fight (Original Sound Track) (Fania 615, 1982)
- Lo Que Pide La Gente (Fania 629, 1984)
- Viva La Charanga (Fania 640, 1986)
- Bamboleo (Fania 650, 1988)
- Guasasa (Fania 660, 1989)
- Fania All Stars with Pete "El Conde" Rodríguez (Fania 690, 1996; Masucci Music 82382, 1997; Third 33342, 1998)
- Fania All Stars with Cheo Feliciano (Fania 695, 1996; Masucci Music 82383, 1997)
- Fania All Stars with Ismael Miranda (Fania 696, 1996; Masucci Music 82384, 1997; Third 33344, 1998)
- Bravo (Fania 711, 1997; Masucci Music 82351, 1997)
- Best of Fania All Stars (Fania 718, 1997) 2-CD compilation
- Fania All Stars with Celia Cruz (Masucci Music 82352, 1997; Third 33341, 1998)
- Fania All Stars with Hector Lavoe (Masucci Music 82353, 1997; Third 33343, 1998)
- Fania All Stars with Willie Colón and Ruben Blades (Masucci Music 82354, 1997; Third 33340, 1998)

=== Live albums ===
- Live at the Red Garter, Vol. 1 (Fania 355, 1968)
- Live at the Red Garter, Vol. 2 (Fania 364, 1968)
- Live at the Cheetah, Vol. 1 (Fania 415, 1972)
- Live at the Cheetah, Vol. 2 (Fania 416, 1972)
- Our Latin Thing (Nuestra Cosa) (Original Sound Track) (Fania 431, 1972)
- Latin–Soul–Rock (Fania 470, 1974)
- Fania All Stars (Island ILPS-9331, 1975) reissue of Latin–Soul–Rock
- Live at Yankee Stadium, Vol. 1 (Fania 476, 1975)
- Live at Yankee Stadium, Vol. 2 (Fania 477, 1975)
- Salsa (Original Sound Track) (Fania 481, 1976)
- Salsa Live! (Island HELP-21, 1976) single LP release/reissue of both Live at Yankee Stadium albums minus 2 tracks
- Fania All Stars Live (July 11, 1975, Puerto Rico) (Fania 515, 1978)
- Habana Jam (Fania 554, 1979)
- Live in Africa (Fania FA-15, 1986) recorded 1974
- Live in Japan 1976 (Fania FA-116, 1986)
- "Live" June 11, 1994, Puerto Rico (Fania 684, 1995)
- Live at Yankee Stadium (Fania 802, 2004) deluxe edition 2-CD set
- Hot Sweat: The Best of Fania All Stars Live [2CD] (Vampi Soul CD-046, 2005)
- San Juan 73 (Fania/Emusica/UMG 773 130 477, 2009)
- Ponte Duro: The Fania All Stars Story (Fania/Código Music 463 950 8010, 2010) 4-CD box set compilation

=== Filmography ===
- Our Latin Thing (Nuestra Cosa) (Fania MPIV-431, 1993; Vampi Soul DVD-001, 2004)
- Salsa (Fania MPIV-481, 1993; Vampi Soul DVD-002, 2004)
- Live in Africa (Fania MPIV-15, 1993; Vampi Soul DVD-003, 2004) recorded 1974
- "Live" June 11, 1994, Puerto Rico (Fania FV-684, 1995; Vampi Soul DVD-004, 2004)
