= Luis "Perico" Ortiz =

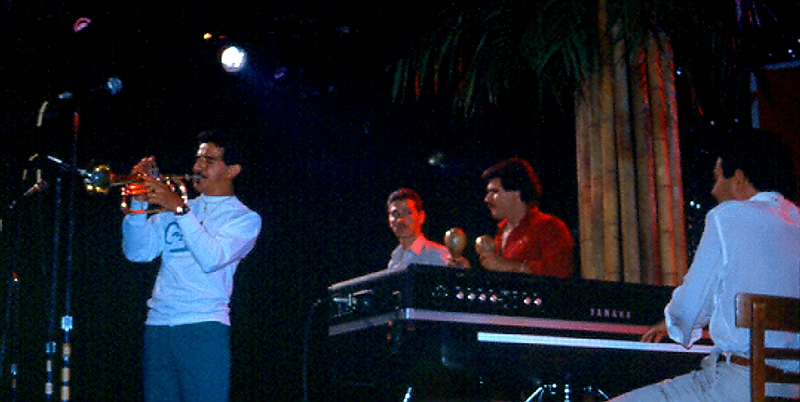
- "Perico" on trumpet.

Background information
- Also known as: "Perico"
- Born: Luis Ortiz; December 24, 1949 (age 76); San Juan, Puerto Rico
- Genres: Salsa
- Occupations: Musician, composer, musical arranger, producer
- Instrument: Trumpet

Luis Ortiz, better known as Luis "Perico" Ortiz (born December 24, 1949), is a Puerto Rican trumpet player, composer, musical arranger, and producer.

== Early years ==
Ortiz was born in San Juan, Puerto Rico, the capital city of the island. He was raised in Santurce, a sector of San Juan. His family's love of music influenced him from an early age. When his parents realized that their child was interested in music, they enrolled him in the Escuela Libre de Música de Puerto Rico, a school that specializes in music education. From there, he went on to study at the Conservatory of Music of Puerto Rico.

== Puerto Rican Symphony Orchestra ==
After he graduated from the Conservatory, Ortiz enrolled and attended the University of Puerto Rico to continue his musical education, where he eventually earned his bachelor's degree. In 1967, at the age of eighteen, Ortiz participated as a guest soloist with the Puerto Rican Symphony Orchestra conducted by Pablo Casals.

In 1970, Ortiz moved to New York City and gained recognition as a talented trumpet player, composer, arranger, and producer for his work with the likes of Tito Puente, Mongo Santamaría, Fania All Stars, Willie Colón, Ismael Quintana, Roberto Roena and his Apollo Sound, Blondie, and David Bowie. He also accompanied Ann-Margret, Dionne Warwick, Diahann Carroll, Trini Lopez, Engelbert Humperdinck, Sammy Davis Jr., Tony Bennett, Paul Anka, and The Supremes with his trumpet.

== Ortiz's own band ==
In 1971, Ortiz formed his own band and won the "Diplo" award in Puerto Rico for "The Best Trumpet Player of the Year". He was also awarded four Latin New York Magazine Trophies: "Best Trumpet Player of the Year", "Arranger of the Year", "Best Orchestra of the Year", and "Musician of the Year". In 1981, he was awarded an "ACE" Award for "Best Interpreter of Salsa Music" and another "ACE" award in 1982 for the "Best New York Orchestra". In 1987, Ortiz and his band set out on a world tour which included the following places: United States, Puerto Rico, South America, Central America, and Europe.

== Discography ==
The following are among Ortiz's discography:

=== Studio albums ===
- Super Salsa (1978)
- My Own Image (1978)
- One of a Kind (1979)
- El Astro (1981)
- Sabroso! (1982)
- Sabor Tropical (1983)
- Entre Amigos (1983)
- El Isleño (1984)
- La Vida en Broma (1985)
- In Tradition (1986)
- Breaking the Rules (1987)
- Vuelvo Otra Vez (1990)
- At Valley Cottage (1990)
- The Man, His Trumpet and His Music... Are Back! (1992)
- Café con Leche y Dos de Azúcar (1996)
- Emociones (1998)
- Jamming (2002)
- Déjalo Entrar (2004)
- Cristo Está en Victoria (2007)
- Tiempo de Amar (2013)
- Sigo Entre Amigos (2021)

=== Compilations ===
- Lo Mejor de Luis "Perico" Ortiz (1981)
- Exitos, Vol. 1 (1997)
- Exitos, Vol. 2 (1998)
- Millonarios de la Salsa (2002)

== Luis "Perico" Ortiz Productions, Inc. ==
In 1988, Ortiz founded his first company, Dialen Promotions, Inc. The company offers advertising, sound engineering, production, and arrangement services in its own studios for radio and television "jingles". Among his clients are Smirnoff, McDonald's, Kodak, John Casablancas, Polaroid, and HBO.

In 1993, Ortiz founded another company in Puerto Rico, Luis "Perico" Ortiz Productions, Inc. His new clients include The Walt Disney Company and Quincy Jones. During the decade of the 1990s, Ortiz traveled with his band and performed in Aruba, Colombia, and Japan. He also performed in Puerto Rico, alongside Lucecita Benítez and Tommy Olivencia, at the Luis A. Ferré Performing Arts Center in San Juan. Ortiz directed and produced a recording for Japanese singer Yoshihito Fukumoto, a member of the band Sweet Basil, Inc.

== Later years ==
In 2002, Ortiz won a "TU Musica" Award for the "Best Christmas Production" and in 2004 he produced the first ever salsa gospel album. Luis "Perico" Ortiz currently continues to produce music and soundtracks. He is also a professor at the Conservatory of Music of Puerto Rico where he teaches Jazz Performance and Caribbean Music.

== See also ==
- List of Puerto Ricans
