= Alegre Records =

American Latin music record label

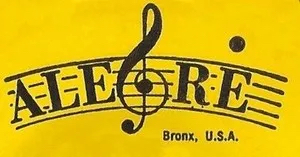
- Founded: 1956
- Founder: Al Santiago
- Defunct: 1975
- Status: Inactive
- Genre: Latin
- Country of origin: United States
- Location: Bronx, New York

Alegre Records was a New York City record label specialized in latin music. It was founded in 1956 by Al Santiago who owned a 1950s record store at 8522 Westchester Avenue in The Bronx named Casalegre and co-founded by clothing businessman Ben Perlman. It specialized in Latin music and was significant for featuring artists such as Johnny Pacheco and Tito Puente and was the first to record a series of great Latin artists, from Johnny Pacheco, Eddie Palmieri, through Willie Colón. It has been called the "Blue Note" of Latin music.

In 1960, Johnny Pacheco's first orchestra had signed with Alegre Records and their first album titled “Johnny Pacheco y Su Charanga” sold over 100,000 copies within the first year and was the biggest selling album in Latin music history up to that point.

In 1961, Al Santiago created the Alegre All Stars (also spelled Alegre All-Stars), remembering the well-known Cuban Jam Sessions ("Descargas Cubanas") in the 1950s on the Panart Records label. Johnny Pacheco got his friend, the trombonist Barry Rogers, to play with the Alegre All-Stars which featured a unique instrumentation of flute, tenor sax, and trombone. Fred Weinberg was Santiago's and the labels favorite sound engineer who also recorded many of the artists individually.

In 1975, Alegre Records was sold to Fania Records.

== See also ==
- List of record labels
- 1956 in music
