= Ralfi Pagan =

- Also known as: Ray Paige
- Born: Rafael Pagan; 11 September 1946
- Origin: Bronx, New York, U.S.
- Died: November 1978 (aged 32)
- Genres: Latin soul/boogaloo, salsa, disco, Latin pop
- Occupation: Singer
- Years active: 1966–1978
- Labels: Fania Records, Pumpkris, Coco Records

Ralfi Pagán (born Rafael Pagán; 1946–1978) was an American singer-songwriter of Puerto Rican descent. Born and raised in the The Bronx borough of New York City, he was an early pioneer of the Latin soul and salsa music genres, Pagán sang both in Spanish and English and released five albums during the 1970s. He is well-known for the duet with Sylvia Robinson entitled "Soul Je T'aime" and for his solo version of "Make It with You" previously recorded by David Gates and Bread. Ralfi toured with music producer and promoter Eddie Torres for several years throughout Southwest United States. Prior to leaving on tour, Pagan visited Torres' home to share he was leaving for Colombia. Torres told Pagan he had a bad feeling about the trip and advised Pagan not to go, but the singer went to Colombia against Torres' advice. In 1978, Pagan was murdered while on a promotional tour in Colombia. His murder remains unsolved.

== Early career ==
The first recording released by Pagán was an all-but-unnoticed 45RPM single recorded in New York and released in 1966 on the RCA Victor label under the name Ray Paige. Subsequently, as a backing vocalist Pagán featured on a number of recordings by King Nando's Orchestra (real name Fernando Rivera) until 1969. Pagán released the self-titled album Ralfi Pagan on Fania Records in 1971, produced by Kenny Vance. It was issued twice, first with all Spanish sang titles and shortly after with four English song titles substituted for the four Spanish titles. Pagán's falsetto tenor favored ballads such as "Who Is the Girl for Me", "Don't Stop Now", and "I Can't See Me Without You". This made him highly popular among young Latino Americans, particularly in the urban centers of Los Angeles and New York, where Pagán made a significant cultural impact. He was also adept on up-tempo salsa such as his cover of Oscar Brown's "Brother, Where Are You?".

In 1971, he broke through nationally with a Latin cover of "Make It with You" which entered the Billboard R&B chart on 10 July 1971 for an eleven-week run during which it peaked at No. 32. It sold 250,000 copies nationally and Pagán appeared on the nationally syndicated TV show Soul Train, making him one of the first Latino artists to ever appear on the program.

Pagán released his second album titled With Love in 1971, produced by Harvey Averne and Jerry Masucci. Recorded in New York, the project consolidated his status among urban Latinos. The album featured some of Pagán's most iconic work such as "To Say I Love You", "Stray Woman", his hit single "Make It with You", and Joe Baatan's love song "Just One of Your Kisses". Pagán had his own style of Latin soul vocalizing, playing a large part in the reason why he is considered the epitome of the genre.

A further R&B hit in 1973 with "Soul Je T'Aime", a duet with Sylvia Robinson on Vibration Records was his last appearance on the national charts. The Ralfi album containing Latin soul and salsa-influenced tracks was released the same year.

In 1975, he released his fourth and final Fania album I Can See, which included his take on the Smokey Robinson & the Miracles track "Ooh Baby Baby", and "Stay Out of My Life".

== Chicano favorite ==
By 1976, Pagan was based in Los Angeles where he connected with Colombian band leader drummer percussionist Mike Rojas. He found particular favor among young Chicanos for whom his persona as a sensitive Latin lover resonated. In Los Angeles, he recorded his last album El Flaco De Oro with Mike Rojas, who features with a timbal solo on the song titled "Cubita Triste". Pagan became a regular on the thriving club and salsa dance circuit that included The Gold Dust on Garfield Avenue in Montebello, The King's Table in Pico Rivera, The Monterey West in East Los Angeles and the Mardi Gras across from MacArthur Park.

Pagán maintained a parallel career as a salsa singer and as a Latin style disco singer. He released "Girl from the Mountain" on CoCo Records in 1976, a record aimed primarily at the disco market. The album El Flaco De Oro (sung entirely in Spanish), however, represented him as a salsa singer. This release appeared on Pumkris Records, for whom he also handled production duties on an album by Johnny Nelson entitled Ralfi Pagan Presenta Johnny Nelson - El Principe de La Salsa. Pagan's final known release is the disco sounding "Take Me with You" b/w "Heaven Sent You", also on Pumkris. An album, Take Me with You was scheduled, but Pagan's early death curtailed its release.

== Death ==
Pagan had a large following in Latin America and regularly appeared in South America. Ralfi Pagan was murdered while substituting for fellow Fania Records performer, Joe Bataan, while on tour in Colombia in 1978. His family was told that a promoter arranged for his murder to avoid payment of money due, with his body being left on a local beach.

Most of Pagan's back catalogue has been made available since the mid-1990s, and he is now probably better known to the general music-listening public than he was during his lifetime. A Fania track from 1973, "The Gambler", was featured in the Leon Ichaso film Pinero (2001) starring Benjamin Bratt as the poet-playwright-actor Miguel Pinero.

== Discography ==
=== Albums ===
- 1969: Ralfi Pagan (Fania 377; CD reissue: Emusica/UMG 773 130 093, 2006; LP reissue: Craft Recordings Latino CR00768, 2024)
- 1971: With Love/Con Amor (Fania 397; LP reissue: Craft Recordings Latino CR00429, 2022)
- 1972: With Love (Fania 397; CD reissue: Fania 78724 40397 29, 1996) this is a re-release/compilation with 4 Spanish language tracks removed and replaced by 4 English language tracks from Ralfi Pagan
- 1973: Ralfi (Fania 417; CD reissue: Fania 78724 40417 22, 1996)
- 1975: I Can See (Fania 488: CD reissue: Emusica/UMG 773 130 357, 2008)
- 1978: El Flaco De Oro (Pumkris 1002)
- 1978: Take Me with You (unreleased)
- 2000: East Side Classics (Fania 728) compilation
- 2004: The Legend (EMI Latin 64001 44274 26) compilation

=== Selected singles ===
- 1966: "Don't Stop Now / Ain't No Soul (Left in These Shoes)"
- 1969: "Who Is the Girl for Me / Pelao"
- 1970: "El Hijo De Mama / Don't Stop Now"
- 1971: "Make It with You / Stray Woman" – US #104; US R&B #32
- 1972: "Negrona / Mi Camacho"
- 1972: "Baby I'm-a Want You / Look at Her"
- 1972: "Come Back Baby / I Can't See Me Without You"
- 1972: "Up on the Roof / The Gambler"
- 1973: "My Dream / It's All Right"
- 1973: "Soul Je T'Aime" (with Sylvia)
- 1974: "Wonderful Thing / To Say I Love You"
- 1974: "Didn't Want To Have To Do It / Too Late"
- 1975: "Just for a Little While / Loneliest Loneliness"
- 1975: "La Vida / I Could Never Hurt You Girl"
- 1976: "Girl from the Mountain"
- 1978: "Take Me with You / Heaven Sent You"
