= Louie Ramirez =

American jazz musician and composer

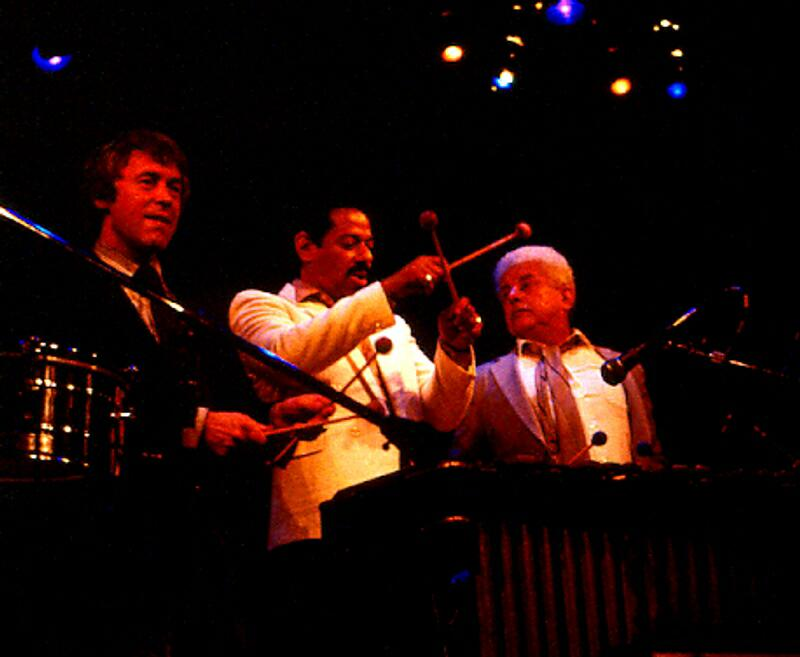
Louie Ramirez with Warren Chiasson (left) and Tito Puente (right).

Louie Ramirez (February 24, 1938 – June 7, 1993) was an American salsa and latin jazz percussionist, vibraphonist, arranger and composer. He co-wrote with Johnny Pacheco the 1961 hit "El Güiro De Macorina". He has been called "the Quincy Jones of Salsa."

== Biography ==
Ramirez was born in New York City, the son of Puerto Rican parents.

== Career ==
He made his professional debut with Joe Loco's band in 1956, replacing vibraphonist Pete Terrace. Ramirez made his own debut as a bandleader in 1964, with Introducing Louie Ramirez (Remo Records). He subsequently recorded for Alegre, Fania, Atco, United Artists, Caiman, FNA and RMM Records.

He partnered with Charlie Palmieri and Joe Cuba from 1965 to 1968. With Tito Rodriguez he released the album Tito Rodríguez y Louie Ramírez En Algo Nuevo in 1972; and also recorded with Ray de La Paz. He became a staff producer at Fania in 1975. He appeared as a sideman or a production assistant on many recordings by other artists, such as Willie Colón, in the 1970s.

== Death ==
On June 7, 1993, while driving along Junction Boulevard in Queens, New York, Ramirez suffered a fatal heart attack, at the age of 55. He was recording his third album with the singer Ray De La Paz. It was entitled Preparate Bailador.
