= Santos Colón =

Puerto Rican musician

- Born: November 1, 1922; Sabana Grande, Puerto Rico
- Died: February 21, 1998 (aged 75); Carolina, Puerto Rico
- Occupations: singer, percussionist

Ángel Santos Vega Colon (November 1, 1922 – February 21, 1998), aka Santitos Colón, was a Puerto Rican bolero and mambo singer, born in Sabana Grande, Puerto Rico and raised in Mayagüez. He was also known by the moniker: "The Man with The Golden Voice".

== Youth and early career ==
Colón was born in Sabana Grande, Puerto Rico, but moved to the Dr. Luis Vadi Benelli street of the Cristy residential district in Mayagüez, Puerto Rico, a location which he constantly made a reference to during his lifetime. His parents were Francisco Vega and Felícita Colón. He attempted to sing as a hobby in his early youth, occasionally teaming with Lester Cole, one of the brothers of composer Roberto Cole and later Mayagüez mayor Benjamín Cole. Their pairing was interchangeably known as "El Dúo Juvenil" and "El Dúo Azul". He later joined Frank Madera's orchestra but only could participate in activities during the day, since he was too young to join the band at nightly functions. Colón's tenure in Madera's orchestra lasted six years (1939–1944)

Mon Rivera (The Younger) was a bandmate of his. At the same time, Rivera had a partnership with Germán Vélez (later the father of international singer Wilkins Vélez and journalist Bruni Vélez) called "El Dúo Huasteco". Colón joined Rivera and Vélez occasionally and toured as a trio over western Puerto Rico.

== Colón and Tito Puente ==
Colón was a long-time member of Tito Puente's orchestra and was a member of the Fania All-Stars. His is the voice heard singing chorus most prominently and saying "¡Ajá! ¡Ajá!" in the original version of Oye Como Va by Puente's orchestra.

== Solo career ==
Santitos became well known as a singer of boleros and Spanish language versions of English standards, often recorded with an orchestral backing. His signature song was "Niña". Fania selected Santos Colón and Cheo Feliciano as solo singers despite having Justo Betancourt and Monguito el Único under contract.

== Personal life ==
Santitos Colón is survived by his sons Santos and George and daughter Diana Vega Namer, who reside in Sarasota, Florida. He is also survived by his wife Judy. Santitos is survived by several grandchildren and great-grandchildren. He lost another son, Héctor, to liver disease in July 1998.

== Death ==
In the early morning hours of February 20, 1998, he went to the recording studio More Audio Productions to bring his voice to two boleros in duet with the singer Carmen Delia Dipiní. But, just before preparing to carry out this task, he felt a strong stomach pain when asked to sing. However, instead of going to a doctor, he chose to return to his home in Laguna Gardens neighborhood in Carolina, where the pain turned acute. The next morning, February 21, 1998, he suffered a stroke, so he was transferred to the Dr. Federico Trilla Regional Hospital in Carolina. Shortly after his arrival, he fell into a deep coma. He died that night.

Doctors discovered he was suffering from prostate cancer and that this condition was in a very advanced stage. Santitos never complained or received treatment to combat the illness. Five days before, on February 15, 1998, he had recorded his participation in the program "Voices in function," the singer Lou Briel animated and produced in WIPR / Channel 6 and which was broadcast a week after his death. The next day, on February 17, 1998, he made his last performance, which was in "El Show de Raymond Arrieta", in WAPA TV / Channel 4. A significant detail presentation occurred during the second season could be a warning of his impending end: while playing one of his hits, "hours and minutes" - bolero of Antonio Jose "Pepe" Quirós who vocalized hundreds of times over 30 years - he forgot the lyrics for a moment. Although his seniority allowed him to overcome the situation without much difficulty, it was the first time in more than six decades of artistic career.

== Discography ==
- Portrait Of Santos Colón (Fania Records), 1969
- Santitos (Fania Records), 1970
- Love Story (Fania Records), 1971
- Imágenes / Éxitos De Santos Colón (Fania Records), 1971
- Fiel (Fania Records), 1972
- Brindis De Navidad (Fania Records), 1972
- Long Live The King (Cotique), 1973
- Santitos Y Su Pueblo (Cotique), 1974
- Con Mucho Cariño (Fania Records), 1975
- Siempre Santitos (Fania Records), 1976
- Bonita (Fania Records), 1977
- Con Placer (Fania Records), 1979
- Mis Grandes Éxitos En El Bolero De Amor (Disco Hit), 1994
- Bolero De Amor / Parte II (Disco Hit), 1995
- Un Santo Para La Historia (DHCD), 1998

With Tito Puente Orchestra

- Dance Manía (1958 - RCA Víctor)
- Mucho Cha Cha (1959 - RCA Víctor)
- Tambó (1960 - RCA Víctor)
- The Exciting Tito Puente Band In Hollywood (1961 - GNP)
- El Rey Tito : Bravo Puente (1962 - Tico)
- In Puerto Rico (Live) (1963 - Tico)
- Excitante Ritmo (1963 - Tico)
- El Mundo Latino De Tito Puente (1963 - Tico)
- Mucho Puente (1964 - Tico)
- De Mi Para Ti (1964 - Tico)
- Carnaval En Harlem (1965 - Tico)
- Stop & Listen / Pare & Oiga (1967 Tico)
- El Rey [The King] (1968 - Tico)
- Tito Puente En El Puente [On The Bridge] (1969 Tico)
- Pa’ Lante [Straight] (1970 - Tico)
- No Hay Mejor [There Is No Better] (1975 - Tico)
- Homenaje A Beny (1978) Plays with Tito Puente ("Dolor Y Perdón")
- Homenaje A Beny (1979) Plays with Tito Puente ("Como El Arrullo De Palmas")
- The Mambo King : His 100th Album (1991 - RMM)
- Y Su Pueblo (1974 - Fania)

With Fania All Stars

- Live At The Cheetah (Vol. 1&2)
- Our Latin Thing (1971)
- Live In Africa (1974)
- Fania All Stars At Yankee Stadium (1975)
- Tribute To Tito Rodríguez (1976)
- Commitment (1980)
- Latin Connection (1981)

With Payo Alicea & Sexteto La Playa

- Vaya Means Go ! (Mardi Grass), 1968

With Wilkins

- No Se Puede Morir Por Dentro (Velvet), 1977

With Artistada Puertorriqueña

- Somos El Prójimo (1986)

With Miguelito Miranda & Orquesta

- Miguelito Miranda & Orquesta (Verne), 1948 re released as 50 years in music (CR), 1987.

Plays with Panchito Minguela

With Joey Hernández

- ¡Compárame ! (PMA), 1989
