= Fania Records =

American record label

- Fania Records logo
- Parent company: Concord
- Founded: 1964
- Founder: Johnny Pacheco; Jerry Masucci
- Distributor: Universal Music Group
- Genre: Salsa; Latin
- Location: New York City, Miami
- Official website: www.fania.com

Fania Records is a New York–based record label founded by Dominican-born composer and bandleader Johnny Pacheco and his American lawyer Jerry Masucci in 1964. The label took its name from a popular luncheonette frequented by musicians in Havana, Cuba that Masucci frequented when he worked for a public relations firm there during the pre-Castro era. Fania is known for its promotion of salsa music.

== History ==
Frustrated by the meager amount of money he was receiving for his recordings, Johnny Pacheco started Fania in 1964 and sold records to music stores out of the trunk of his car. To help finance the business, he consolidated with his Brooklyn-born Italian lawyer and promoter Jerry Masucci, and in 1964 founded the Fania label to produce, promote and market the music of Latinos in New York. The label started out as a small venture, but gained popularity after the success of Johnny Pacheco's first official 45 rpm record "Cañonazo" (Fania 321), and LP album Mi Nuevo Tumbao... Cañonazo (Fania LP-325) leading to the expansion of its talent base that Pacheco envisioned. Among Fania's signature stars are Pete "El Conde" Rodríguez, Hector Casanova, Rey Reyes, Willie Colón, Celia Cruz, Larry Harlow, Joe Bataan, Ray Barretto, Ralfi Pagan, Luis "Perico" Ortiz, Bobby Valentín, Rubén Blades, Héctor Lavoe, Cheo Feliciano, Adalberto Santiago, Ismael Miranda and many others.

In 1968, Pacheco created a supergroup known as the Fania All-Stars that brought together the elite of his salsa musicians and singers for joint performances and recording. They made their debut at the Red Garter club located in New York's Greenwich Village, but it was their 1971 performance at the Cheetah, a club in Midtown Manhattan, which became legendary. Pacheco was music director and guided the band on stage. The Fania All-Stars were filmed for the documentary Our Latin Thing released a year later.

In 1970, Masucci and Pacheco launched Fania's sub-label Vaya Records. In the first years of the Vaya label, Masucci and Pacheco signed the duo Ricardo "Richie" Ray and Bobby Cruz, along with Celia Cruz, Mongo Santamaria and Cheo Feliciano. In the following year, Vaya acquired Cotique Records.

In 1973, Fania All-Stars performed at Yankee Stadium to a stadium with 45,000 attendees. Pacheco directed the band to an excited crowd who cheered on each Fania All-Star member.

As of 2007 all that is left is "Larry Harlow and the Latin Legends of Fania". In 2003, the 1975 Fania release Live at Yankee Stadium was included in the second set of 50 recordings preserved in the United States National Recording Registry. Masucci, who had bought out Pacheco's share of the company around 1967, became the sole owner of Fania Records and the numerous other labels and umbrella labels in South America that he acquired and created. Masucci died in 1997, and for the next eight years Fania and all of its assets were tied up in probate court while various parties battled over its ownership.

In September 2005, Fania's assets were sold to V2 Records (Europe) and Miami-based Emusica Records (US), and by early 2006, the new owners began to reissue material from Fania's back catalog (some of which had never appeared on CD before) with enhanced sound and liner notes. In an effort to create additional content, Código Music, a subsidiary of the Emusica label, allowed DJs and producers to remix the original material for 'new' releases.

As of July 27, 2018, Fania is now owned by Concord Records (with its back catalog on Craft Recordings Latino), which acquired the label from Código Music Entertainment. Fania's catalogue included 19,000 master recordings and 8,000 compositions.

== List of artists ==
- Johnny Pacheco
- Ernie Agosto
- José Alberto "El Canario"
- Tito Allen
- Edwin "Tito" Asencio
- Harvey Averne
- Camilo Azuquita
- Lope Balaguer
- Gato Barbieri
- Ray Barretto
- Roberto Barrios
- Joe Bataan
- Eddie Benitez
- Justo Bentancourt
- Roberto Blades
- Rubén Blades
- Jimmy Bosch
- Sonny Bravo
- Ángel Canales
- Hector Casanova
- Julio Castro
- Santos Colón
- Willie Colón
- Mickey Cora
- Bobby Cruz
- Celia Cruz
- Sal Cuevas
- Frankie Dante
- Chivirico Davila
- Alfredo De La Fé
- Ray De La Paz
- Mark Dimond
- Fania All Stars
- Jose Fajardo
- Cheo Feliciano
- Fiebre Latina
- Marty Galagarza
- Eric Gale
- Junior González
- George Guzman
- Andy Harlow
- Larry Harlow
- Isidro Infante
- Eladio Jimenez
- Reynaldo Jorge
- La Lupe
- Rolando La Serie
- La Sonora Ponceña
- The Latinaires
- Héctor Lavoe
- Pupi Legarreta
- Papo Lucca
- Emo Luciano
- Ray Maldonado
- Jose Mangual Jr.
- Nicky Marrero
- Raúl Marrero
- Ismael Miranda
- Eddie Montalvo
- Andy Montañez
- Luis Ogando
- Tommy Olivencia
- Orquesta Dicupé
- Orquesta Inmensidad
- Orquesta Novel
- Orquesta Salomé
- Johnny Ortiz
- Luis "Perico" Ortiz
- Orlando Pabellón
- Ralfi Pagan
- Leopoldo Pineda
- Bobby Quesada
- Ismael Quintana
- Louie Ramirez
- Rey Ramos
- Ricardo "Richie" Ray
- Fausto Rey
- Rey Reyes
- Ismael Rivera
- Mon Rivera
- Ralph Robles
- Roberto Roena
- Johnny "Dandy" Rodríguez
- Pete "El Conde" Rodríguez
- Roberto Rodríguez
- Barry Rogers
- Ismael Rosa
- Willie Rosario
- Jimmy Sabater
- Néstor Sánchez
- Mongo Santamaria
- Monguito Santamaria
- Jorge Santana
- Adalberto Santiago
- Daniel Santos
- Seguida
- Lenni Sesar
- Sociedad 76
- Luigi Texidor
- Típica 73
- Yomo Toro
- Juancito Torres
- Rafi Val
- Bobby Valentín
- Tito Valentin
- Javier Vásquez
- Polito Vega
- Orestes Vilató
- Wilkins
- Roberto Yanes
- Johnny Zamot
- Hector "Bomberito" Zarzuela

== Selected Various Artists Anthologies ==
- Fania 1964–1994: 30 Great Years (Volume 1) (Fania JM702, 1994) 2-CD
- Fania 1964–1994: 30 Great Years (Volume 2) (Fania JM703, 1994) 2-CD
- Hidden Treasure (Fania JM777, 2003)
- Más Recuerdos Romanticos (Vene Music/Universal Music Latino 278 653 057, 2006)
- Muchos Más Recuerdos Romanticos (Vene Music/Universal Music Latino 278 653 058, 2006)
- Soneros de Siempre (Vene Music/Universal Music Latino 278 653 075, 2006)
- Soneros de Siempre, Volume 2 (Vene Music/Universal Music Latino 278 653 078, 2006)
- Que Viva La Salsa! (Vene Music/Universal Music Latino 278 653 148, 2006)
- Fania Signature – Hot Salsa (Vene Music/Universal Music Latino 278 653 176, 2006)
- Fania Signature – Latin Soul (Vene Music/Universal Music Latino 278 653 177, 2006)
- Fania Signature – Boogaloo (Vene Music/Universal Music Latino 278 653 178, 2006)
- Fania Signature – Hard Salsa (Vene Music/Universal Music Latino 278 653 179, 2006)
- Boogaloos de Siempre (Vene Music/Universal Music Latino 278 653 442, 2006)
- Fania Records 1964–1980: The Original Sound of Latin New York (Fania/Emusica/UMG 773 130 165, 2011) 2-CD
- Salsa Explosion (The Sound of Fania Records) (Starbucks/Fania/Emusica/UMG 773 130 189, 2007)
- Leyendas De La Fania, Vol. 1 (Fania/Emusica/UMG 773 130 233, 2007)
- Leyendas De La Fania, Vol. 2 (Fania/Emusica/UMG 773 130 254, 2007)
- Leyendas De La Fania, Vol. 3 (Fania/Emusica/UMG 773 130 266, 2007)
- Leyendas De La Fania, Vol. 4 (Fania/Emusica/UMG 773 130 280, 2007)
- Fania: The Original Salsa Sound (Fania/Emusica/UMG 773 130 286, 2007) 3-CD
- Leyendas De La Fania, Vol. 5 (Fania/Emusica/UMG 773 130 291, 2007)
- Latin Lounge Jazz: Havana (Fania/Emusica/UMG 773 130 307, 2006)
- Latin Lounge Jazz: San Juan (Fania/Emusica/UMG 773 130 308, 2006)
- Latin Lounge Jazz: Spanish Harlem (Fania/Emusica/UMG 773 130 309, 2006)
- N.Y.C Salsa (The Incendiary Sound of Latin New York) (Fania/Emusica/UMG 773 130 311, 2007) 2-CD
- El Barrio: Gangsters, Latin Soul & the Birth of Salsa 1967–1975 (Fania/Emusica/UMG 773 130 313, 2007)
- El Barrio: The Bad Boogaloo – Nu Yorican Sounds 1966–1970 (Fania/Emusica/UMG 773 130 314, 2007)
- El Barrio: Sounds from the Spanish Harlem Streets (Fania/Emusica/UMG 773 130 346, 2008)
- N.Y.C Salsa 2 (The Incendiary Sound of Latin New York) (Fania/Emusica/UMG 773 130 348, 2006)
- El Barrio: Latin Funk – Nu Yorican Funk 1968–1976 (Fania/Emusica/UMG 773 130 360, 2008)
- I Like It Like That (Fania Remixed: The Remixes and The Originals) (Mr. Bongo/Fania [UK] MRBCD061, 2008; Fania/Código Music 463 950 7067, 2010) 2-CD
- I Like It Like That (Fania Remixed) (Fania/Emusica/UMG 773 130 364, 2008)
- On One, Vol. 1 (The Music of Fania) (Fania/Emusica/UMG 773 130 365, 2008)
- On Two, Vol. 1 (The Music of Fania) (Fania/Emusica/UMG 773 130 366, 2008)
- Cha Cha Cha, Vol. 1 (The Music of Fania) (Fania/Emusica/UMG 773 130 367, 2008)
- Leyendas De La Fania, Vol. 6 (Fania/Emusica/UMG 773 130 388, 2008)
- N.Y.C Salsa 3 (The Incendiary Sound of Latin New York) (Fania/Emusica/UMG 773 130 395, 2008)
- El Barrio: Back on the Streets of Spanish Harlem (Fania/Emusica/UMG 773 130 407, 2008)
- Leyendas De La Fania, Vol. 7 (Fania/Emusica/UMG 773 130 408, 2008)
- Leyendas De La Fania, Vol. 8 (Fania/Emusica/UMG 773 130 423, 2008)
- El Barrio: Latin Disco – Dancefloor Grooves with a Latin Touch (Fania/Emusica/UMG 773 130 427, 2009)
- Salsa – A Musical History (Fania/Emusica/UMG 773 130 444, 2008) 4-CD
- Salsa One (Fania/Emusica/UMG 773 130 453, 2008)
- Salsa Explosion! (The New York Salsa Revolution 1968–1985) (Strut/Fania [UK] STRUT068CD, 2010)
- Fania Records 1964–1980 (The Original Sound of Latin New York) (Strut/Fania [UK] STRUT078CD, 2011) 2-CD
- The 75 Greatest Fania Songs (Wagram Music [Fr] 3596972846922, 2013) 5-CD
- Fania Records: The 60's, Volume One (Fania/Código Music 463 950 7161, 2013)
- Fania Records: The 60's, Volume Two (Fania/Código Music 463 950 7162, 2013)
- Fania Records: The 60's, Volume Three (Fania/Código Music 463 950 7163, 2014)
- Fania Records: The 70's, Volume One (Fania/Código Music 463 950 7164, 2013)
- Fania Records: The 70's, Volume Two (Fania/Código Music 463 950 7165, 2013)
- Fania Records: The 60's, Volume Four (Fania/Código Music 463 950 7166, 2014)
- Fania Records: The 60's, Volume Five (Fania/Código Music 463 950 7167, 2014)
- Fania Records: The 70's, Volume Three (Fania/Código Music 463 950 7168, 2014)
- Fania Records: The 70's, Volume Four (Fania/Código Music 463 950 7169, 2014)
- Fania Records: The 70's, Volume Five (Fania/Código Music 463 950 7170, 2014)
- Fania Goes Psychedelic (Craft Recordings Latino/Concord, 2019) 15 tracks/digital only
- It's A Good, Good Feeling (The Latin Soul of Fania Records: The Singles) (Craft Recordings Latino/Concord CR00277, 2021) 4-CD
- It's A Good, Good Feeling (The Latin Soul of Fania Records: The Singles) (Craft Recordings Latino/Concord CR00278, 2021) 2-LP
- Fania Records: The Latin Sound of New York (1964–1978) (Craft Recordings Latino/Concord CR00827, 2025) 2-LP
