= Our Latin Thing =

1972 documentary film directed by Leon Gast

- Directed by: Leon Gast
- Produced by: Larry Harlow; Jerry Masucci
- Cinematography: Ted Churchill; Steven Harris; Thomas Reichman; Burleigh Wartes
- Music by: The Fania All-Stars, under the musical direction of Johnny Pacheco
- Production company: Fania Records
- Distributed by: A&R Film Distributors
- Release date: 1972

Our Latin Thing (Spanish: Nuestra Cosa Latina) was a 1972 documentary film directed by Leon Gast about the burgeoning Latin music scene in New York City. It focused on a concert put together by the management of Fania Records at Manhattan's Cheetah nightclub featuring a group of Fania artists called the Fania All-Stars. The film was distributed by A&R Film Distributors headed by Alex Masucci, Fania Records founder Jerry Masucci's younger brother and subsequent Fania Records Vice President, and Ray Aviles.
