= Ismael Quintana =

Puerto Rican salsa singer (1937–2016)

- Born: June 3, 1937; Ponce, Puerto Rico
- Died: April 16, 2016 (aged 78) Colorado, U.S.
- Genres: salsa
- Occupations: Singer; composer
- Years active: 1960–1980s

Ismael Quintana (June 3, 1937 – April 16, 2016) was a Puerto Rican singer and composer of salsa music.

== Early years ==
Quintana was born in Ponce, Puerto Rico. His family moved to The Bronx sector of New York when he was only two weeks old; there he went to school and while he was still in high school he formed a band with his neighborhood friends.

== Conjunto La Perfecta ==
In 1961, bandleader Eddie Palmieri heard Quintana sing in an audition and invited him to join his newly organized conjunto (small band), La Perfecta. Quintana accepted and became the lead singer of the band between 1961 and 1973. During this time he co-wrote some of Palmieri's major hit songs. With Palmieri, Quintana was awarded the 1966 Trophy for the "Most Popular Latin Singer of the Year", awarded at the Palladium Ballroom in New York.

Quintana left Palmieri for a solo career and signed with Vaya Records (subsidiary of Fania Records). Between 1974 and 1983, he recorded five albums as a solo artist, scoring his first major hit with "Mi Debilidad" ("My Weakness").

== Tours ==
In addition to a solo career, Quintana also participated with the Fania All-Stars and went on tour with them to Africa, Japan, France, Central and South America and the United States. In 1976, he made an appearance in the movie Salsa, with Celia Cruz and the Fania All-Stars. During the 1980s, he recorded "Vamos, Háblame Ahora" ("Come On, Talk to Me Now") with Papo Lucca.

== Later years ==
Quintana semi-retired from the world of music because of health issues and lived with his family in New York. He moved with his family to Colorado where, on April 16, 2016, he died of heart failure, at the age of 78. Quintana was buried in Ponce, the city where he was born, at Cementerio La Piedad. He was survived by his wife Yolanda and three children: Ismael, David, and Jessica.

== Recordings ==
External audio
- Listen to Ismael Quintana's "No me maltrates" on YouTube.

Among Quintana's recordings are:

=== Soloist ===
- "Punto y Aparte" (1971);
- "Dos Imágenes" (1972);
- "Ismael Quintana" (1974);
- "Lo Que Estoy Viviendo" ("What I'm Living Through") (1976);
- "Amor, Vida y Sentimiento" ("Love, Life and Feelings") (1977);
- "Jessica" (1979) (with Ricardo Marrero and The Group);
- "Mucho Talento" (1980) (with Papo Lucca).

=== With Eddie Palmieri ===
- "Eddie Palmieri y La Perfecta" (1961);
- "El Molestoso" (1962);
- "Lo Que Traigo Es Sabroso" (1963);
- "Echando Pa’ Lante" ("Straight Ahead") (1964);
- "Azúcar Pa' Ti" ("Sugar for You") 1965);
- "Mozambique" (1966);
- "Molasses" (1967);
- "Champagne" (1968);
- "Justicia" (1969);
- "Superimposition" (1970);
- "Vamonos Pa'l Monte" (1971);
- "Recorded Live at Sing Sing, Vol. 1" (1972);
- "Recorded Live at Sing Sing, Vol. 2" (1974);
- "Sentido" (1973);
- "Timeless". Live recording;
- "Eddie Palmieri Live At The University of Puerto Rico" 1974);
- "Eddie Palmieri" (1981).

=== With Cal Tjader and Eddie Palmieri ===
- El Sonido Nuevo (Verve, 1967)
- "Bamboléate": Eddie Palmieri & Cal Tjader" (Tico, 1968)

=== With The Fania All-Stars ===
- "Live at Yankee Stadium, Vol. 2";
- "Fania All Stars in Japan";
- "Live in Africa";
- "Salsa: Original Motion Picture Sound Track Recording";
- "Tribute To Tito Rodríguez";
- "Habana Jam";
- "Commitment";
- "Lo Que Pide La Gente";
- "Live In Puerto Rico 1994";
- "Bravo 97";
- "Viva Colombia".

=== With Tito Puente ===
- "Homenaje a Beny Moré", Vol. 1;
- "Homenaje a Beny Moré", Vol. 2.

=== With Vladimir Vassilief ===
- "Vladimir and His Orchestra: New Sound in Latin Jazz".

=== With Jimmy Delgado ===
- "Salsa con Dulzura".

=== With Joe Cuba Sextet ===
- "Songs Mama Never Taught Me".

== See also ==
- List of Puerto Ricans
- List of people from Ponce, Puerto Rico
