= Jerry Masucci =

Co-founder of Fania Records

Gerald Masucci (October 7, 1934 – December 21, 1997) was an American attorney, businessman and was co-founder of Fania Records.

== Biography ==
Masucci was born in Brooklyn, New York to Italian immigrant parents Urbano and Elvira Masucci. He was a police officer in New York City before attending, and during law school. In 1960, he graduated from New York Law School as a juris doctor. He then worked for a public relations firm in Cuba, where he became interested in Latin music.

In 1964 in New York City, Masucci, then a divorce attorney, and Johnny Pacheco, a Dominican musician, established Fania Records. They started out selling records out of the trunk of cars on the streets of Spanish Harlem, signing up young artists, creating new sounds, and eventually having hit records. Over the next 15 years, Fania Records helped define the sound, culture, and language associated with the salsa genre, a musical movement that arose partly from the unavailability in the United States of music produced in Cuba.

In 1980, he was running Fame, a modeling agency.

In the 1990s, Masucci spent long periods of time in Buenos Aires, Argentina, where he resided for part of the year. In December 1997, he suffered from acute abdominal pain while playing tennis, for which he underwent surgery at a private clinic in Vicente López (Clínica Olivos). During the postoperative period, on Sunday, December 21, following the placement of a nasoenteral tube, he experienced serious complications that culminated in acute respiratory distress syndrome and refractory shock. Despite advanced resuscitation and support maneuvers implemented in the Intensive Care Unit, he died that same afternoon. The following week his remains were transferred to New York and later cremated. It was reported that he had three daughters, Darlene, Misty and Corinne.

== Discography ==
=== Studio albums ===
- Ray Barretto, Acid (Fania, 1968)
- Fania All Stars, Tribute to Tito Rodríguez (Fania, 1976)
- Fania All Stars, Latin Connection (Fania, 1981)
- Fania All Stars, Social Change (Fania, 1981)
- Fania All Stars, Guasasa (Fania, 1989)

=== Live albums ===
- Live at the Red Garter, Vol. 1 (Fania, 1968)
- Live at the Red Garter, Vol. 2 (Fania, 1969)
- Live at the Cheetah, Vol. 1 (Fania, 1972)
- Live at the Cheetah, Vol. 2 (Fania, 1972)
- Latin–Soul–Rock (Fania, 1974)
- Fania All Stars (Island, 1975)
- Live at Yankee Stadium, Vol. 1 (Fania, 1975)
- Live at Yankee Stadium, Vol. 2 (Fania, 1975)
- Live in Japan 76 (Fania, 1976)
- Fania All Stars Live (July 11, 1975, Puerto Rico) (Fania, 1978)
- Habana Jam (Fania, 1979)
- Live in Africa (Fania, 1986)

=== DVDs ===
- Our Latin Thing (Fania, 1972)
- Salsa (Fania, 1974)
- In Africa (Fania, 1993)
- Live (Fania, 1995)
