= Justo Betancourt =

Cuban musician

Justo Betancourt (born December 6, 1940) is a Cuban singer famous for his interpretation of "Pa' bravo yo". He was born in Matanzas, Cuba, but has lived a significant amount of time in Puerto Rico. Betancourt led a group called Borincuba (Conjunto Borincuba), a combination of the names Cuba and Borinquen, a name for Puerto Rico of Taíno origin. In addition to recording a number of solo albums, he has played with the Fania All Stars and Sonora Matancera, as well as performing with musicians and singers such as Celia Cruz, Mongo Santamaría, Eddie Palmieri and Ray Barretto, among others.

== Discography ==
- El Explosivo (1968)
- El Que Sabe, Sabe (1970)
- Los Dinamicos (1971) with Johnny Pacheco.
- Pa' Bravo Yo (1972)
- Sigo Bravo (1974)
- Lo Sabemos (1975)
- Ubane (1976)
- Distinto y Differente (1977)
- The Best of Justo Betancourt (1977)
- ¡Presencia! (1978)
- Yo Sin Ti (1979)
- La Sonora Matancera con Justo Betancourt (1981)
- Leguleya No (1982)
- El Bravo de Siempre (1992)
- Mato (1998)
