= Johnny Pacheco =

Dominican musician (1935–2021)

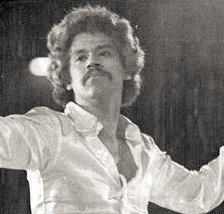

Background information
- Born: Juan Pablo Knipping Pacheco; 25 March 1935; Santiago de los Caballeros, Dominican Republic
- Origin: New York City, U.S.
- Died: 15 February 2021 (aged 85) Teaneck, New Jersey, U.S.
- Genres: Son; guaracha; cha-cha-chá; pachanga; jazz; salsa; merengue
- Occupations: Musician; arranger; composer; producer
- Instruments: Flute; conga; bongo; güiro; saxophone; accordion
- Years active: 1953–2021
- Labels: Alegre; Fania
- Formerly of: Charlie Palmieri; Fania All-Stars; Pete "El Conde" Rodríguez

Juan Pablo Pacheco Knipping (25 March 1935 – 15 February 2021), known as Johnny Pacheco, was a Dominican musician, arranger, composer, bandleader, and record producer. Born in the Dominican Republic, Pacheco became a leading figure in the New York salsa scene in the 1960s and 1970s as the founder and musical director of Fania Records.

Pacheco was one of the leading exponents of pachanga, a blend of Cuban rhythms and Dominican merengue in the late 1950s. He popularized the use of the term "salsa" and established the Fania All-Stars to showcase the leading artists of the genre, which propelled him to worldwide fame and had an important role in the evolution of Latin music.

Pacheco was a nine-time Grammy nominee and was awarded the Latin Grammy Lifetime Achievement Award by the Latin Recording Academy in 2005.

== Early life and family ==
Juan Pablo Pacheco Knipping was born on 25 March 1935 in Santiago de los Caballeros, a city in the Dominican Republic. He inherited his passion for music from his father, Rafael Azarías Pacheco, who was the leader and clarinetist of the Orquesta Santa Cecilia. One of the leading Dominican big bands of the 1930s, the Orquesta was the first to record Luis Alberti's merengue "Compadre Pedro Juan". Rafael was the grandson of a Spanish soldier who arrived during the Spanish reannexation of Santo Domingo. His mother, Octavia Knipping Rochet, was the granddaughter of a French colonist, and the great-granddaughter of a German merchant who was married to a Dominican woman born to Spanish colonists.

Pacheco and his family left the Dominican Republic for New York City when he was eleven years old, where his family recided in Edenwald, a small neighborhood in Eastchester, Bronx and the Edenwald Houses. As a child, he learned to play several instruments including accordion, violin, flute, saxophone and clarinet. He later attended Brooklyn Technical High School, majoring in electrical engineering. He worked in this field for a time, but eventually quit due to low salary levels. He studied percussion at the Juilliard School. From his first marriage, Pacheco had two daughters, Norma and Joanne. From his second marriage, Pacheco had two sons, Philip and Elis, who also excelled in the music business. Pacheco married his long time girlfriend Cuqui in 1984, and they remained together until his passing.

== Early music career ==
In 1953, Pacheco played percussion and sang with Gil Suárez's band. In the following year, he co-founded The Chuchulecos Boys with Eddie Palmieri on piano, Barry Rogers on trombone and other future figures of renown in the New York salsa scene: Al Santiago, Mike Collazo and Ray Santos. They played at weddings and other social events. He later played percussion for several bands, including late-night shows, Lou Pérez's band The Mambaleros, and the popular orchestras of Tito Puente, Xavier Cugat and Dioris Valladares.

=== La Duboney ===
In October 1958, Pacheco met pianist Charlie Palmieri and he joined him to record the Latin jazz album Easy Does It, released by Gone Records. Pacheco played congas and bongos. Palmieri and Pacheco then formed the charanga La Duboney in 1959, where Pacheco played flute. However, he soon grew dissatisfied with his role in the group; Palmieri's name was featured on the cover of the LPs but not his, despite his role as lead arranger and co-director. Moreover, Palmieri's style was more sophisticated and less marketable, while Pacheco favored simpler son-based arrangements. After only one LP, Let's Dance the Charanga (United Artists), Pacheco left La Duboney to form his own charanga in 1960.

=== Pacheco Y Su Charanga ===
Pacheco formed his own band, Pacheco Y Su Charanga, in 1960. Their first promotional single "El güiro de Macorina"/"Óyeme mulata", received much airplay in New York from DJ Rafael Font. Al Santiago, owner of Alegre Records, decided to offer Pacheco and his band a record deal. Their debut album Pacheco y su Charanga (Alegre LPA-801) sold 100,000 copies within the first year of its release. Pacheco's success led to a new dance fad, the pachanga (combination of "Pacheco" and "charanga"). The music for the pachanga was heavily influenced by the uptempo merengue and cha-cha-cha hybrid style originated by Eduardo Davidson in 1959; José Fajardo's charanga popularized this style in Cuba.

Pacheco toured throughout the United States, Europe, Asia and Latin America in support of the album. Pacheco Y Su Charanga were the first Latin band to headline the Apollo Theater in New York City; they did so in 1962 and 1963.

The band's success led them to record four more albums for Alegre Records (Volumes 2–5). Pachecco also reunited with Charlie Palmieri for two albums: the 1961 jam session The Alegre All-Stars and the collaborative album Las Charangas. However, Al Santiago encountered financial difficulties, influencing Pacheco's decision to exit Alegre Records in 1963.

== Fania Records ==
In late 1963, Pacheco met Jerry Masucci, a lawyer, and soon they co-founded Fania Records. Pacheco was the VP, A&R creative director, and musical producer of the new label. At Fania, Pacheco launched and solidified the careers of many popular salsa artists. He named the label after the song "Fanía" by Reinaldo Bolaños, made famous by Estrellas de Chocolate in Cuba in 1960.

=== Pacheco y su Nuevo Tumbao ===
Pacheco reorganized his charanga and transformed it into a conjunto by adding trumpets instead of violins. His first album with his new band, Pacheco y su Nuevo Tumbao, was Mi Nuevo Tumbao... Cañonazo, the first release on Fania Records (LP-325). Featuring Pete "El Conde" Rodríguez on vocals, the album was the first of many recordings by the "compadres" (literally, "godfathers"), as Pacheco and El Conde were later known. Except for the closing song on the album "Dakar, punto final", all the songs were covers, including the aforementioned "Fanía", the title track and "El Kikirikí" by Evaristo Aparicio, Eduardo Angulo's "Cabio Sile Yeyeo", Cheo Marquetti's "Pinareño" and Walfrido Guevara's "Labrando la Tierra", all by popular Cuban artists of the 1950s and 1960s.

In 1965, Pacheco recorded three albums, two of which featured Monguito el Único as lead vocalist: Pacheco at the N.Y. World's Fair and Pacheco Te Invita a Bailar. The third album consisted of instrumental descargas (jam sessions), and was called Pacheco, His Flute and Latin Jam. In 1966, Pacheco worked with Monguito and Chivirico Dávila to record another album, Viva África, named after the fact that Pacheco had recently toured the continent. He then reverted to the charanga format for one album, aptly titled Pacheco Y Su Charanga: By Popular Demand. In 1967, he recorded Sabor Típico with Pete "El Conde" Rodríguez and Pacheco Presents Monguito, the debut album of Monguito el Único as lead artist. In 1968, he recorded the instrumental album Latin Piper and Volando Bajito with El Conde on lead vocals. Pacheco and El Conde then recorded three collaborative albums: Los Compadres (1970), La Perfecta Combinación (1971) and Tres de Café y Dos de Azúcar (1973), as well as five reunion albums between 1980 and 1989.

=== Fania All-Stars ===
Having recorded Cuban-style jam sessions (descargas) with both the Alegre All-Stars (1961) and the Tico All-Stars (Live at the Village Gate, Volumes 1–3, 1966), Pacheco decided to record a live album to showcase the Fania roster of salsa musicians. The resulting album Live at the Red Garter (1968) was a success and has been described as an "excellent and promising start for the supergroup". Among the stars featured in the concert were pianist Larry Harlow, bassist Bobby Valentín and conguero Ray Barretto. The lineup of the group varied over the years, and by the time of their second show, Live at the Cheetah (1971), many members had changed.

=== Pacheco Y Su Tumbao Añejo ===
In 1974, Pacheco replaced El Conde (who went on a successful solo career) with Héctor Casanova and renamed his band Pacheco Y Su Tumbao Añejo ("Pacheco and his old tumbao", as opposed to his previous band "the new tumbao"). They released El Maestro in 1975 and The Artist in 1977. However, Pacheco's focus during the 1970s, apart from the All-Stars, was a series of collaborative albums between members of the label, including himself. He collaborated with Celia Cruz, Justo Betancourt, Papo Lucca, Pupi Legarreta, José Fajardo, Luis "Melón" Silva, and Celio González among others. With Héctor Casanova he released another album, Los Amigos, in 1979. After his various reunion albums with El Conde, including the 25th anniversary Nuevo Tumbao reunion album, Celebración (1989), Pacheco released ¡Sima! in 1993, his last studio album.

== Legacy ==
Pacheco recorded and composed over 150 songs. Among them are "Mi Gente", "La Dicha Mia", "Quítate Tú", "Acuyuye", "El Rey de la Puntualidad", Tito Puente's "El Número Cien", and Celia Cruz's Celia y Tito. Pacheco has also been an inspiration to the younger generations. For example, rap artist Mangu invited him to collaborate on an album entitled Calle Luna y Calle Sol; Pacheco arranged the album, sang in the chorus, and played the flute. Pacheco also produced music for feature films. The first film he worked on was the 1972 documentary Our Latin Thing; this was also the first film about the influence of salsa on Latino culture in New York City. His second film Salsa was released in 1974. In the 1980s, he composed the scores for Mondo New York and Something Wild. The latter was a collaboration with David Byrne, the lead singer of the group Talking Heads. Several tracks that he arranged, produced, and/or performed were included on the soundtrack of the 1992 Warner Brothers film, The Mambo Kings.

Pacheco performed in the 1988 AIDS benefit concert "Concierto Por La Vida", held at Avery Fisher Hall. He also collaborated with the Hispanic Federation Relief Fund to raise money for the victims of Hurricane Georges. Pacheco established the Johnny Pacheco Scholarship Fund in 1994 for college students in the New York metropolitan area.

The Johnny Pacheco Latin Music and Jazz Festival is an annual event that is held in mid-November at Lehman College.

== Awards and recognition ==
In 1975, Pacheco made history as the first Dominican to be nominated for a Grammy in the Best Latin Recording section for his El Maestro album. Pacheco earned nine Grammy nominations and ten gold records. His contributions to Latin Music have been recognized throughout his career.

In 1996, the then-President of the Dominican Republic, Joaquín Balaguer, conferred the prestigious Presidential Medal of Honor on Pacheco. A year later, Pacheco was the recipient of the Bobby Capó Lifetime Achievement Award, awarded by New York Governor George Pataki. In addition, Pacheco received the First International Dominican Artist Award at the Casandra Awards. In June 1996, Johnny Pacheco became the first Latin music producer to receive the National Academy of Recording Arts & Sciences (NARAS) Governor's Award.

In 1998, Pacheco was among the first group of artists inducted into International Latin Music Hall of Fame (ILMHF). The ILMHF awarded him the Lifetime Achievement Award in 2002.

In 2004, Pacheco was awarded the American Society of Composers, Authors and Publishers, ASCAP Silver Pen Award.

On June 5, 2005, Pacheco was honored by Union City, New Jersey with a star on the Walk of Fame at Union City's Celia Cruz Park.

In 2005, the Latin Academy of Recording Arts & Sciences awarded Johnny Pacheco with its Lifetime Achievement Award at that years Latin Grammys.

In 2007, Pacheco was portrayed by Nelson Vasquez in the movie El Cantante, starring Marc Anthony and Jennifer Lopez.

On March 24, 2009, Pacheco was awarded "El Soberano", the highest distinction given by the Association of Art Columnists of the Dominican Republic.

In August 2020, Johnny Pacheco's composition "Celia y Tito" by Tito Puente and Celia Cruz was featured in the 4th-season finale of the NBC TV network program "World of Dance" which is produced and judged by international film and recording star Jennifer Lopez.

== Death ==
A resident of Fort Lee, New Jersey, Pacheco died at Holy Name Medical Center in Teaneck on 15 February 2021, aged 85, after being admitted to the hospital with pneumonia-related complications. He was funeralized at St. Cecilia Catholic Church in East Harlem.

== Discography ==
=== As leader ===
Alegre Records

- Pacheco y su Charanga (Alegre LPA-801, 1961)
- Pacheco y su Charanga, Vol. 2 (Alegre LPA-805, 1961)
- Las Charangas (Alegre LPA-807, 1961)
- The Alegre All-Stars (Alegre LPA-810, 1961)
- Que Suene la Flauta: Pacheco y su Charanga, Vol. 3 (Alegre LPA-811, 1962)
- Suav'ito: Pacheco y su Charanga, Vol. 4 (Alegre LPA-820, 1962)
- Spotlight on Pacheco: Pacheco y su Charanga, Vol. 5 (Alegre LPA-827, 1963)

Fania Records

- Mi Nuevo Tumbao... Cañonazo (Fania LP 325, 1964)
- Pacheco at the N.Y. World's Fair (Fania LP 326, 1964)
- Pacheco Te Invita a Bailar (Fania LP 327, 1965)
- Pacheco, His Flute and Latin Jam (Fania LP 328, 1965)
- Viva África (Fania LP 330, 1966)
- By Popular Demand (Fania LP 333, 1966)
- Sabor Típico (Fania LP 339, 1967)
- Pacheco Presents Monguito (Fania LP 341, 1967)
- Latin Piper (Fania LP 358, 1968)
- Volando Bajito (Fania LP 363, 1968)
- La Perfecta Combinación with Pete "El Conde" Rodriguez (Fania LP 380, 1970)
- Los Compadres with Pete "El Conde" Rodriguez (Fania LP 400, 1971)
- Los Dinámicos with Justo Betancourt (Fania LP 402, 1971)
- Tres de Café y Dos de Azúcar (Fania LP 436, 1973)
- Celia & Johnny with Celia Cruz (Vaya VS-31, 1974)
- Tremendo Caché with Celia Cruz (Vaya VS-37, 1975)
- El Maestro with Héctor Casanova (Fania LP 485, 1975)
- Recordando el Ayer with Celia Cruz, Justo Betancourt (Vaya VS-52, 1976)
- The Artist with Héctor Casanova (Fania LP 503, 1977)
- Los Dos Mosqueteros (The Two Musketeers) with Pupi Legarreta (Vaya VS-63, 1977)
- Llegó Melón with Luis "Melón" Silva (Vaya VS-70, 1977)
- Eternos with Celia Cruz (Vaya VS-80, 1978)
- Los Amigos with Héctor Casanova (Fania LP 540, 1979)
- Los Distinguidos with Daniel Santos (Fania LP 549, 1979)
- Las Tres Flautas with Pupi Legarreta, José Fajardo (Fania LP 561, 1980)
- Champ (Fania LP 581, 1980)
- Sabrosura (Fania LP 587, 1980)
- Celia, Johnny y Pete with Celia Cruz, Pete "El Conde" Rodriguez (Vaya VS-90, 1980)
- El Zorro de Plata y El Flaco de Oro (Fania LP 600, 1981)
- Pacheco y Fajardo with Jose Fajardo (Fania LP 603, 1982)
- De Película with Rolando La Serie (Fania LP 613, 1982)
- De Nuevo Los Compadres with Pete "El Conde" Rodriguez (Fania LP 625, 1983)
- Flying High with Luis "Melón" Silva (Vaya VS-100, 1983)
- Jícamo with Pete "El Conde" Rodriguez (Fania LP 638, 1985)
- De Nuevo with Celia Cruz (Vaya VS-106, 1985)
- Salsobita with Pete "El Conde" Rodriguez (Fania LP 644, 1987)
- Celebración with Pete "El Conde" Rodriguez (Fania LP 652, 1989)
- ¡Sima! (Fania LP LP 670, 1993)

Compilations

- Había Una Vez (Once Upon a Time) (Alegre LPA-883, 1970)
- 10 Great Years (Fania LP 409, 1972)
- Lo Mejor de Pacheco (The Best of Pacheco) (Alegre CLPA-7011, 1974)
- La Crema (Fania LP 567, 1980)
- Introducing... Johnny Pacheco (Charly/Caliente HOT121CD, 1989)
- Pacheco's Party (Charly Latin HOT512CD, 1994)
- Johnny Pacheco (Fania CD 725, 2000)
- The Best of Johnny Pacheco (Charly SNAD524CD, 2001) 2-CD
- Entre Amigos (Bronco BR175CD, 2005)
- El Maestro/A Man and His Music (Fania/Emusica/UMG 773 130 075, 2006) 2-CD
- Pacheco: Reserva Musical (digital, 2008)

=== As sideman ===
With Melanie

- Gather Me (Neighborhood/Famous Music, 1971)

With George Benson

- Giblet Gravy (Verve, 1968)
- Tell It Like It Is (A&M/CTI, 1969)

With Kenny Burrell

- Blues - The Common Ground (Verve, 1968)
- Night Song (Verve, 1969)

With J. J. Johnson

- Goodies (RCA, 1965)

With Johnny Lytle

- A Man and a Woman (Solid State, 1967)

With Les McCann

- Les McCann Plays the Hits (Limelight, 1966)

With McCoy Tyner

- McCoy Tyner Plays Ellington (Impulse!, 1964)

With Kai Winding

- Dance to the City Beat (Columbia, 1959)

=== With the Fania All-Stars ===
- Live at the Red Garter, Vol. 1
- Live at the Red Garter, Vol. 2
- Live at the Cheetah, Vol. 1
- Live at the Cheetah, Vol. 2
- Live at Yankee Stadium, Vol. 1
- Live at Yankee Stadium, Vol. 2
- Habana Jam
- Live in Africa
- Live in Japan 1976
- Delicate and Jumpy
- Tribute to Tito Rodríguez
- Rhythm Machine
- Spanish Fever
- Crossover
- Commitment
- California Jam
- Social Change
- Latin Connection
- Lo Que Pide La Gente
- Viva La Charanga
- The Perfect Blend
- Bamboleo
- Guasasa
- Live 1994, Puerto Rico
- Bravo
- Viva Colombia (The Cali Concert)
- Live in San Juan 1973

== Filmography ==
- Our Latin Thing (Fania, 1972)
- Salsa (Fania, 1974)
- Celia Cruz and the Fania All Stars In Africa (Fania, 1993)
- Live (June 11, 1994, Puerto Rico) (Fania, 1995)
- Soul Power (2008)

== See also ==
- List of Afro-Latinos
- Music of Latin America
- Music of New York City
- Latin Jazz
- Charanga (Cuba)
- Guaguancó
- Son cubano
- Salsa
- Afro-Cuban jazz
- List of people from the Dominican Republic
