= A Man And His Music: Poeta del Pueblo =

Compilation album by Rubén Blades
- Released: March 11, 2008
- Genre: Salsa
- Length: 153:27
- Languages: Spanish; English
- Labels: Fania; Universal Music Latino
- Producers: Johnny Pacheco; Jerry Masucci

Rubén Blades chronology
Mundo (2002)	A Man And His Music: Poeta del Pueblo (2008)	Cantares del Subdesarrollo (2009)

A Man And His Music: Poeta del Pueblo also known as Poeta del Pueblo is the fourth compilation album by Rubén Blades released on March 11, 2008. Being together with his album Anthology released on March 27, 2012 similar compilations only that this compilation has more successes in his career in Fania, the album contains songs by Blades in his stay at Fania from 1974 (with Willie Colón and Ray Barreto) until 1988 with the album With Strings featuring songs like El Cantante, Tiburón, Ligia Elena and Pedro Navaja.

== Background ==
After releasing Mundo on September 17, 2002, Fania released the Greatest Hits and Anthology compilation album series, Fania released the A Man And His Music series with their versions of A Band And His Music, along with Craft Recordings and Concord Music. Music with A Woman And His Music. compiling songs like Te Están Buscando with Willie Colón, Paula C, Plástico among others. Also included are the albums The Last Fight, Canciones del Solar de los Aburridos, Metiendo Mano! and Siembra also containing songs with the Fania All Stars such as the aforementioned Paula C which was originally recorded with Louie Ramírez (appearing on the album Louie Ramírez Y Sus Amigos) Juan Pachanga appearing on his album Rhythm Machine and "La Palabra Adiós" on his album Commitment.

== Tracklisting ==
=== Disc 1 ===
All songs have been adapted from AllMusic.

All tracks are written by Rubén Blades, except where noted.

No.	Title	Writer(s)	Length
1.	"Descarga Caliente (featuring Pete Rodríguez)"	Rubén Blades	5:23
2.	"Canto Abacuá (featuring Ray Barreto)"	Rubén Blades	8:18
3.	"El Cazangero (featuring Willie Colón and Yomo Toro)"	Rubén Blades	4:06
4.	"Los Muchachos de Belén (featuring Fania All Stars)"	Adolfo O'Reilly	4:43
5.	"Pablo Pueblo (featuring Willie Colón)"	Rubén Blades	3:59
6.	"Plantación Adentro (featuring Willie Colón)"	C. Alonso Curet	5:01
7.	"Me Recordaras (featuring Willie Colón)"	Frank Domínguez	3:48
8.	"Juan Pachanga (featuring Fania All Stars)"	Rubén Blades	6:13
9.	"Paula C (featuring Louie Ramírez)"	Rubén Blades; Louie Ramírez	6:18
10.	"Sin Tú Cariño (featuring Louie Ramírez)"	Rubén Blades; Louie Ramírez	6:26
11.	"Plástico (featuring Willie Colón)"	Rubén Blades	6:41
12.	"Buscando Guayaba (featuring Willie Colón)"	Rubén Blades	5:42
13.	"Dime (featuring Willie Colón)"	Rubén Blades	6:48

=== Disc 2 ===
All the songs on Disc 2 have been adapted from Discogs and AllMusic.

All tracks are written by Rubén Blades, except where noted.

No.	Title	Writer(s)	Length
1.	"Pedro Navaja (featuring Willie Colón)"	Rubén Blades	7:23
2.	"Manuela"	Rubén Blades	5:45
3.	"El Nacimiento de Ramiro"	Rubén Blades	7:09
4.	"Maestra Vida"	Rubén Blades	5:18
5.	"La Palabra Adiós (featuring Fania All Stars)"	C. Alonso Curet	4:56
6.	"Tiburón (featuring Willie Colón)"	Rubén Blades	6:56
7.	"Te Están Buscando (featuring Willie Colón)"	Rubén Blades	6:25
8.	"Ligia Elena (featuring Willie Colón)"	Rubén Blades	6:00
9.	"Madame Kalalú (featuring Willie Colón)"	Rubén Blades	6:54
10.	"Para Ser Rumbero"	Rubén Blades	3:36
11.	"Noé"	David D. Martínez	4:27
12.	"No Hay Chance"	Rubén Blades	4:00
13.	"Mi Jibarita"	David D. Martínez; Rubén Blades	4:40
14.	"El Cantante"	Rubén Blades	6:19
Total length:			183:41

Note: "El Cantante" was simplified "Cantante".
