= Una Década =

Compilation album by Rubén Blades
- Released: 1 April 2003
- Recorded: October 1990 – November 2001
- Genre: Salsa; latin pop; tropical
- Length: 74:36
- Language: Spanish; English
- Label: Columbia; Sony Norte
- Producer: Rubén Blades; Oscar Hernández; Willie Colón; Ángel "Cucco" Peña

Rubén Blades chronology
Mundo (2002)	Una Década (2003)	La Experiencia (2004)

Singles from Una Década
- 1. "Estampa (Radio Edit)" Released: May 3, 2003; 2. "Vida" Released: July 14, 2003

Una Década (transl. One Decade) is a compilation album by Panamanian musician Rubén Blades. It was released on 1 April 2003 by Columbia Records and Sony Norte. The album is a commemoration of Blades' decade at Sony Music from 1991 with Caminando to Mundo in 2002. At the 45th Grammy Awards, the album won Best World Music Album and also received a Latin Grammy Award nomination for Album of the Year.

Una Década features songs mostly written by Blades himself, taken from the albums Caminando, Amor y Control, Tras La Tormenta, La Rosa de los Vientos, Tiempos, and Mundo. The album includes two singles, a radio edit of "Estampa", and "Vida".

== Critical reception ==
Professional ratings
Review scores
Source	Rating
AllMusic	4/5 stars

Evan C. Gutiérrez on AllMusic said that "the common thread throughout is the brilliant musicianship and lyrical excellence that has always set Blades apart from his fellow salseros". Gutiérrez noted Blades' progression from "a fiery, visceral young talent to a sophisticated and masterful musician's musician", and stated, "this is one decade in the history of salsa that ensures Blades' place for decades to come".

== Track listing ==
All tracks are written by Rubén Blades, except where noted

Una Década track listing
No.	Title	Writer(s)	from the album	Length
1.	"Caminando"		Caminando	2:47
2.	"Camaleón"		Caminando	4:15
3.	"Prohibido Olvidar"		Caminando	4:54
4.	"Adán García"		Amor y Control	4:50
5.	"Amor y Control"		Amor y Control	5:52
6.	"Creo en Tí"		Amor y Control	4:40
7.	"Tras la Tormenta" (with Willie Colón)		Tras La Tormenta	6:34
8.	"La Rosa de los Vientos"	Rómulo Castro	La Rosa de los Vientos	5:52
9.	"Sin Querer Queriendo"	Pedro Azael	La Rosa de los Vientos	4:59
10.	"Un Son Para Ti"	Orlando Barroso	La Rosa de los Vientos	5:33
11.	"Eres Mi Canción"	Osvaldo Ayala	La Rosa de los Vientos	4:53
12.	"Vida" (album version)		Tiempos	4:48
13.	"Sicarios"		Tiempos	4:45
14.	"Día a Día"	Blades; L. Carson	Tiempos	5:53
15.	"Estampa" (Radio Edit)		Mundo	4:01
Total length:				74:36
