= Rubén Blades y Son del Solar...Live! =

Rubén Blades y Son del Solar... Live!

Live album by Rubén Blades & Son Del Solar
- Released: March 20, 1990
- Recorded: October 29 & 30, 1989
- Venue: Lone Star Roadhouse, NYC
- Genre: Jazz; latin; folk; World & country; latin jazz; salsa; tropical
- Length: 74:27
- Language: Spanish
- Label: Elektra; WEA International
- Producer: Jerry Solomon; Rubén Blades

Rubén Blades & Son Del Solar chronology
Antecedente (1988)	Rubén Blades y Son del Solar... Live! (1990)	Caminando (1991)

Singles from Rubén Blades y Son del Solar... Live!
- 1. "Ojos de Perro Azul" Released: January 1990; 2. "Pedro Navaja" Released: June 23, 1990; 3. "Todos Vuelven" Released: November 7, 1990; 4. "Desiciónes" Released: March 1991

Rubén Blades y Son del Solar... Live! or also known as Live! is the third live album by Panamanian singer Rubén Blades and the first with the band Son Del Solar released on March 20, 1990. For WEA International Inc. and Elektra Records. The album contains all the featured songs from Blades albums from 1984 (with Buscando América) to 1988 (with Antecedente ), with songs like Decisiones (Live), El Padre Antonio (Live) and also including his hit Pedro Navaja (Live). A song that was not in his stay in Elektra but was in Fania Records on his 1978 album Siembra.

== Background ==
After recording his curious English album Nothing But the Truth in 1988 Blades said goodbye to Elektra to go to Sony Music until 2002 with his studio album Mundo.

== Recordings and songs ==
Blades He wanted to record this album with Son Del Solar to give it a touch of eccentricity, also taking from Gabriel García Márquez the song Cuentas Del Alma, Ojos De Perro azul that was included in his album Crossover Dreams. I also include his success in Elektra Decisiones and Pedro Navaja. He also rewrote the song Muévete originally recorded by Los Van Van.

== Track listing ==
All songs from Live! were written and composed by Rubén Blades except Muévete written by Juan Formell y Los Van Van.

All tracks are written by Rubén Blades.

Rubén Blades y Son del Solar... Live! track listing
No.	Title	Writer(s)	Producer(s)	Length
1.	"Decisiónes"	Rubén Blades	Rubén Blades; Jerry Solomon	6:03
2.	"Cuentas Del Alma"	Blades; Gabriel García Márquez	Blades; Jerry Solomon; Oscar Hernández	6:49
3.	"El Padre Antonio"	Blades	Jerry Solomon	8.46
4.	"Pedro Navaja"	Blades	Blades; Jerry Solomon	9:26
5.	"Todos Vuelven"	Blades	Blades; Hernández	5:53
6.	"La Canción del Final del Mundo"	Blades	Blades; Jerry Solomon	6:35
7.	"Ojos de Perro Azul"	Blades; García Márquez	Hernández; Jerry Solomon	7:05
8.	"Buscando América"	Blades	Blades; Jerry Solomon	11:08
9.	"Muévete"	Blades; Juan Formell	Blades; Jerry Solomon; Hernández	12:16
Total length:				74:27

== Musicians ==
Obtained from Jazz en la Web (in Spanish):

=== Performers ===
- Oscar Hernandez: Piano
- Mike Viñas: Bass
- Ralph Irizarry: Timpani
- Edwin "Eddy" Montalvo: Congas
- Arturo Ortiz: Synthesizers
- Robby Ameen: Drums
- Roger Paiz: Bongos
- Marc Quiñones: Congas
- Angel "Papo" Vásquez, Reynaldo Jorge, Leopoldo Pineda: Trombones

== Staff ==
Obtained and adapted from Discogs:

=== Credits ===
- Art Direction – Carol Bobolts
- Composed by Cesar Miró* (Tracks: 5), Rubén Blades* (Tracks: 1 to 4, 6 to 9)
- Engineer – Jerry Solomon
- Lead Vocals – Rubén Blades
- Mixed by Jon Fausty
- Photography by Frank W. Ockenfels III
- Original lyrics and music written by Juan Formell (Tracks:9)
