= Caminando =

Caminando may refer to:

== Books ==
- Caminando, autobiography of Marta Sahagún 2005

== Music ==
=== Albums ===
- Caminando (album), album by Rubén Blades and Son del Solar 1991
- Caminando, album by Trigo Limpio 1980
- Caminando, album by Tony Tun Tun 1999
- Caminando, album by Millo Torres y el Tercer Planeta 1999
- Caminando, album by Bobby Cruz 2002
- Caminando, album by Sur Caribe and Ricardo Leyva 2005
- Caminando, album by David Liebman and Jean-Marie Machado 2009
- Caminando 2001-2006, Chambao 2007
- Sigue Caminando, album by Lolita (Spanish singer) 2007
- Sigue Caminando, album by Olga Román

=== Songs ===
- Caminando (Rubén Blades song), composed Blades 1991
- Caminando (Amaia Montero song) 2010
- "Caminando", song by flamenco singer Camarón, El Camarón de la Isla composed by Antonio Humanes, with Paco de Lucía from Calle Real (album) 1983
- "Caminando" by Eddie Palmieri composed by Charlie Palmieri from The Best of Eddie Palmieri: Lo Mejor de Eddie Palmieri
- "Caminando" by Ron Carter composed by Ron Carter from When Skies Are Grey 2001
- "Caminando" by Ray Barretto and Celia Cruz from Tremendo Trio: Celia, Ray, Adalberto
- "Caminando" by Lolita (Spanish singer) composed by Roberto Poveda from Sigue Caminando 2007
- "Caminando" by Bobby Cruz composed by Bobby Cruz from album of the same name
- "Caminando" by Ana Belén from Ana en Río and other albums
- "Caminando" by Joe Cuba composed by D.R.S. from Red, Hot and Cha Cha Cha 1965
- "Caminando" by Melina León composed by Donato Póveda / Melina León from the album Dos Caras
- "Caminando" by Dúo Dinámico from Hoy Como Ayer
- "Caminando" by Patrick Sébastien from Ça va être ta fête!
