= Eddie Montalvo =

Puerto Rican Latin jazz and salsa musician

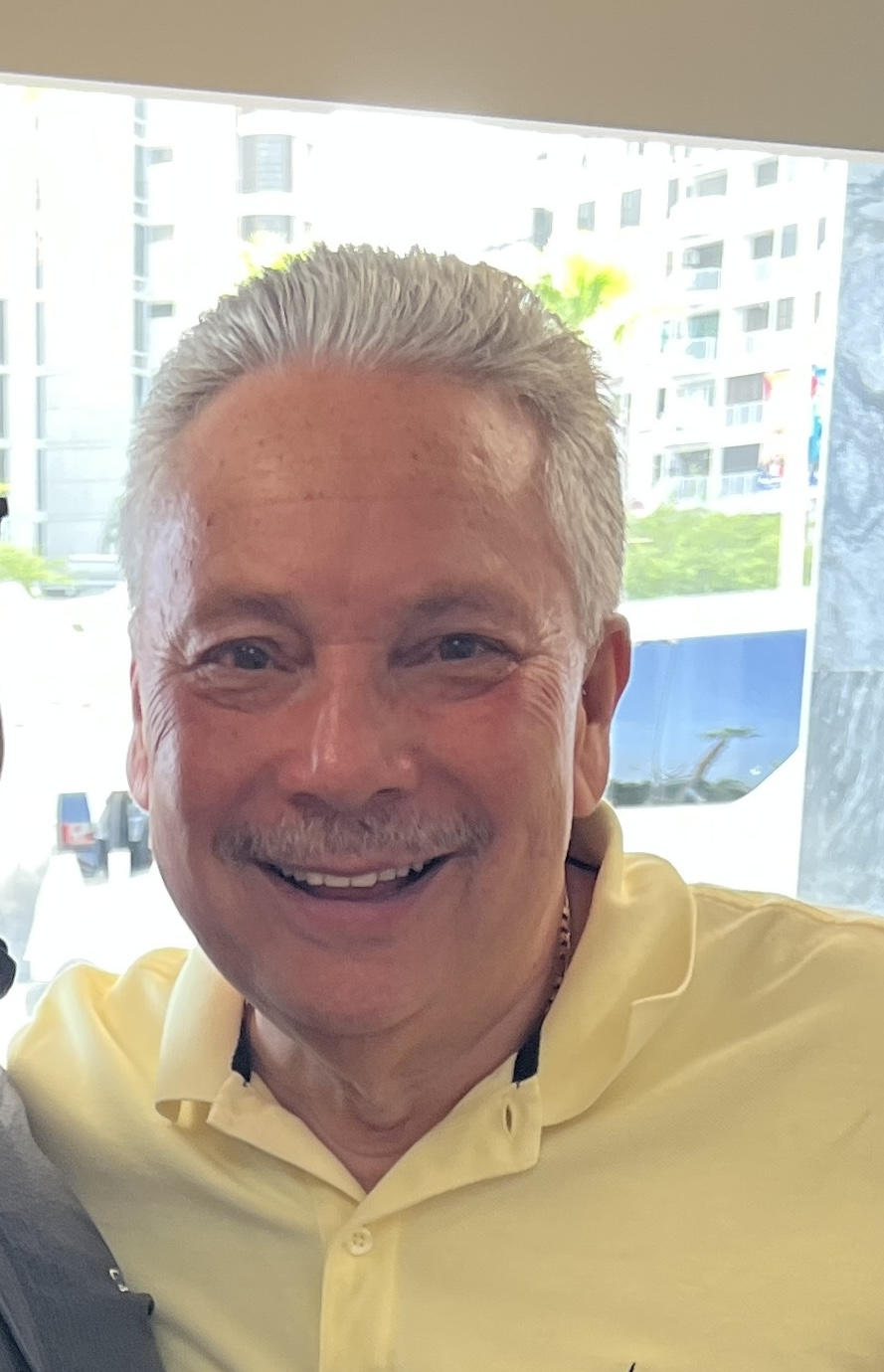

Background information
- Born: September 25, 1952 (age 74); Bronx, New York, US
- Genres: Salsa; son cubano; boogaloo; guaguancó; guajira; cha-cha; pachanga; charanga; montuno
- Occupation: Musician
- Instruments: Congas; bongo; percussion
- Years active: 1969–present
- Labels: Fania; LP Ventures; Señor Marcha Records; Elektra
- Formerly of: Fania All-Stars; Hector Lavoe; Los Kimbos

Edwin "Eddie" Montalvo (born September 25, 1952) is an American percussionist and bandleader of Puerto Rican descent. Born and raised in the Bronx, He is best known for playing the congas for Hector Lavoe, Rubén Blades as well as with the Fania All-Stars.

== Early career ==
Montalvo began playing bongo at the age of seven. He began playing bongo in the parks and with local bands. At the age of 17 he began playing professionally, first with Tony Pabon y La Protesta and Joey Pastrana. He switched to the congas when he joined Julio Romero & the Latin Jazz All-Stars. In 1979 he auditioned for the Fania All-Stars where he became the youngest member of the group, replacing one of his mentors Ray Barretto.

Montalvo has recorded with Willie Colon, Johnny Pacheco, Los Kimbos, Celia Cruz, Ruben Blades, Cheo Feliciano, Bobby Valentin, Papo Lucca, Roberto Roena, Gilberto Santa-Rosa, Nicky Marrero, Gilbert Colon, Ismael Miranda, Johnny Pacheco as well as with Tito Rodriguez, Jr.

He played with Ruben Blades band for twelve years. Montalvo toured with Ruben Blades throughout Europe, Panama and other countries. Montalvo is on many albums such as Ruben Blades y Son Del Solar Live, Buscando America, Amor y Control, Esecenas and Siembra. In 1987 Escenas won a Grammy in the category of Best Tropical Latin Performance.

Montalvo's recording of the Siembra album with Willie Colón and Rubén Blades in 1979 remains one of the best selling salsa albums of all time. It has sold over 25 million copies, and almost all of its songs were hits at one time or another in various Latin American countries. Montalvo recorded songs such as Pedro Navaja, Cuentas Del Alma, Silencios, Buscando America, Desapariciones, Decisiones, and Todos Vuelven.

== Later career ==
In 1995 he released his first solo album, On My Own. Thereafter he joined Joe Madera's Big Three Palladium Orchestra. In 2012 Montalvo released his second solo album, Desde Nueva York a Puerto Rico. It was nominated for a 2013 Grammy Award in the category of Best Tropical Latin Album. Montalvo played with the Tito Nieves band for three years. Thereafter he played with the Frankie Morales orchestra. Due to his professional experience with Hector Lavoe, Montalvo was asked to perform in and consult on the motion picture El Cantante, featuring Marc Anthony and Jennifer Lopez. Latin Percussion LP named a special series of Congas in his honor called LP® Eddiemontalvo Signature Fiberglass

In addition to being a fulltime percussionist he also worked full time as a gas meter installer for over 25 years with ConEdison in New York. While at CoEdison he worked in the recovery efforts at ground zero after the September 11 attacks on the World Trade Center.

== Discography ==
=== As leader ===
- Drum Solos Vol. 1 (1978, LP Ventures)
- Drum Solos Vol. 2 (1978, LP Ventures)
- Drum Solos Vol. 3 (1973, LP Ventures)
- On My Own (1995, Castro Records)
- Desde Nueva York A Puerto Rico (2012, Señor Marcha Records)
- Señor Tambó (2020, Señor Marcha Records)

=== As sideman ===
With Ruben Blades

- Rubén Blades* & Willie Colon*- Siembra (1978)
- Rubén Blades* & Willie Colon* – En Argentina (1983)
- Rubén Blades* Y Seis Del Solar - Buscando América (1984)
- Rubén Blades* Y Seis Del Solar - Escenas (1985)
- Rubén Blades* Y Seis Del Solar - Escenas (1985)
- Rubén Blades* Y Son Del Solar - Live! (1990)
- Ruben Blades Con Son del Solar - Caminando (1991)
- Rubén Blades* Con Son Del Solar - Amor y Control (1992)

With Tony Pabon

- Tony Pabon Y La Nueva Protesta* - Fango - Pura Salsa, Puro Disco (1976)

With Los Kimbos

- Los Kimbos Con Adalberto Santiago - Los Kimbos Con Adalberto Santiago (1976)
- The Big Kimbos With Adalberto Santiago - The Big Kimbos With Adalberto Santiago (1977)

With Johnny Pacheco

- Johnny Pacheco & Hector Casanova* - Los Amigos (1979)
- Johnny Pacheco and Jose Fajardo* - Pacheco Y Fajardo (1982)
- Johnny Pacheco & Pete "Conde" Rodriguez* - De Nuevo Los Compadres (1983)
- Johnny Pacheco & Pete Rodriguez - Salsobita (1987)
- Johnny Pacheco & Pete Conde Rodriguez* - Celebracion (1989)
- Sima! (1993)
- El Maestro: A Man and His Music (2006)

With Conjunto Clasico

- Conjunto Clasico Canta: Tito Nieves - Los Rodriguez (1979)

With Jose Mangual, Jr.

- José Mangual Jr. Y Su Orquesta - Mangual (1980)
- José Mangual Jr. Y Su Orquesta - Que Chevere (1982)
- José Mangual Jr. Y Su Orquesta Con Carlos El Grande* - Lo Que Traigo Es Salsa (1983)
- José Mangual Jr. - Latin Rhythm & Moods (1990)
- Que Chevere (1998)

With Louie Cruz

- Louie Cruz* - Coming Out

With Willie Colon

- Willie Colón - Solo (1979)

With Johnny "Dandy" Rodriguez

- Dandy's Dandy: A Latin Affair (1979)

With Hector Lavoe

- Hector Lavoe - Comedia (1978)
- Hector Lavoe - El Sabio (1980)
- Hector Lavoe - Que Sentimiento! (1981)
- Tu Bien Lo Sabes (2001)

With Fania All-Stars

- Fania All Stars - Commitment (1980)
- Fania All Stars - Latin Connection (1981)
- Fania All Stars - Social Change (1981)
- Fania All Stars - Lo Que Pide La Gente (1984)
- Fania All Stars - Habana Jam (1996)
- Ponte Duro: The Fania All Stars Story (2010)

With Pete "El Conde" Rodriguez

- El Rey (1990)

With Paul Simon

- Paul Simon - Songs From The Capeman (1997)
- The Vampires (2012)
- The Complete Album Collection (2013)

With Celia Cruz

- Celia, Johnny and Pete (1980)
- La Experiencia (2004)

With Rigo Y Su Obra Maestra

- Rigo Y Su Obra Maestra – Rumba Pa' Rumberos (2006)

With Marty Galagarza

- Marty Galagarza y La Conquistadora - Pinocho (1974)

With Seguida

- Seguida - Love Is...(1974)
- Seguida - On Our Way To Tomorrow...(1976)

Luis "Perico" Ortiz

- Luis "Perico" Ortiz - My Own Image (1978)

With Pupi Legarreta

- Pupi Legarreta – Pupi Pa’ Bailar (1980)

With Luigi Texidor

- El Caballero (1980)

With Santiago Cerón

- Canta Si Va’ Cantar (1981)

With Tito Allen

- A Los Muchachos

With Luis Doñe Y El Conjunto Mangú Con Junior Soria

- Mangú (1982)

With Santiago Cerón

- Yo Soy La Ley (1983)

With Caco Senante

- Y Después... Que Le Pongan Salsa (1984)

With Ray Martínez Y Su Sabor Criollo

- Sabor Criollo (1984)

With Monguito El Único

- Yo Soy La Meta (1985)

With Roberto Lugo

- Este Es...Roberto Lugo

== Filmography ==
- Yo Soy La Salsa (2014)
- El Cantante (2006)

== See also ==
- Salsa
- Charanga (Cuba)
- Afro-Cuban jazz
- List of Puerto Ricans
