= De Panamá a New York =

Studio album by Rubén Blades & Pete Rodríguez and His Orchestra
- Released: 1970
- Recorded: 1970
- Studios: Bell Sound (New York City); Sound Factory (Hollywood)
- Genres: Salsa; Latin soul; bolero; guaguancó; guaracha
- Length: 37:31
- Languages: Spanish; English
- Label: Alegre
- Producer: Miguel Estivill

Rubén Blades chronology
De Panamá a New York (1970)	The Good, the Bad, the Ugly (1974)

Professional ratings
Review scores
Source	Rating
AllMusic	3.5/5 stars
The New Rolling Stone Album Guide	3/5 stars

De Panamá a New York (From Panama to New York) is the debut studio album by Panamian singer-songwriter Rubén Blades and the eleventh for Pete Rodríguez and His Orchestra. Released in 1970 through Alegre Records, it contains notable songs such as Descarga Caliente, El Bravo and Juan Gonzáles, which, despite not having the expected success, were the basis for songs like Pedro Navaja, Plástico and Siembra, among others.

This album was recorded during the trip that Blades and his family made in New York. This album also meant the inspiration of the Panamanian to compose the song El Cazanguero included in the album The Good, the Bad, the Ugly.

== Background ==
Blades after arriving in New York for the second time. caught the attention of Alegre Records producer Pancho Cristal who had already produced hits like "I Like It Like That" and Jala Jala y Boogaloo. Who was in charge of instrumentalizing Blades and Pete Rodríguez. The album marks the first Blades mainly composed songs for his albums.

== Songs and their meanings in Blades ==
Although still evolving, many of its essential traits - the storytelling, the common touch, the character sketches, the knack for melody and flashy soneos or vocal improvisations - were already evident here. Many of these songs contain the core of concepts that would flourish in future years. The opening song Juan González, for example, foreshadows his Cipriano Armenteros, recorded in 1975 by Ismael Miranda. Both songs extol the legends of revolutionary folk heroes, borrowing from the Mexican corrido or narrative song, but with a clip-clop salsa beat. It is the differences that are revealing. The later song is much more fleshed out as a story, with more details, more verses, and more concrete action. Also, unlike Juan González, who is killed along with his tired and hungry rebels, Cipriano is rescued in a daring raid by his men who swear revenge, a poignant ending that inspires more than regrets. Still, the artist thought enough of "Juan Gonzalez" four decades later to revive the tune during his 2008 European tour. To foreshadow further, Blades addresses a heartbroken friend bilingually on Hey Man, like this as he headed down a drunken street to a tune that begins What happened, man? From Salsa at Woodstock from 1976 by Bobby Rodríguez and the company. El Pescador has hints of the haunting melody of Prepara, from the 1979 Fania All Stars Crossover; both songs are about outings and both combine tenderness and foreboding. And on "Descarga Caliente," Blades unleashes a torrent of bristling soneos expressing his fierce independence and a sharp social message against simulation and materialism, a clear preamble to "Plástico" and "Siembra" from his classic 1978 album with Willie Colón.

== Track listing ==
All tracks are written by Rubén Blades.

De Panamá a New York track listing
No.	Title	Writer(s)	Producer(s)	Length
1.	"Juan González"	Rubén Blades	Pancho Cristal; Miguel Estivill	3:59
2.	"Solo"		Cristal; Estivill	2:43
3.	"Hey Man"		Cristal; Estivill	3:42
4.	"When"		Cristal; Estivill	2:38
5.	"Descarga Caliente"		Cristal; Estivill; Rubén Blades	5:23
6.	"El Bravo"		Cristal; Estivill	3:37
7.	"Donde"		Cristal; Estivill	2:24
8.	"El Pescador"		Cristal; Estivill	5:52
9.	"Amanecer"		Cristal; Estivill	2:52
10.	"De Panamá a New York"	Blades; Roberto Cedeño	Cristal; Estivill	4:21
Total length:				37:31
