= Tras La Tormenta =

Tras la Tormenta

Studio album by Rubén Blades and Willie Colón
- Released: 31 January 1995
- Recorded: 1993–1994 at the Acme Recordings Studios (New York City)
- Genres: Salsa; charanga
- Length: 52:32
- Language: Spanish
- Labels: Sony Tropical; Epic; Columbia
- Producers: Ángel "Cucco" Peña; Humberto Ramírez; Marty Sheller; Willie Colón; Rubén Blades; Oscar Hernández

Rubén Blades and Willie Colón chronology
The Last Fight (1984)	Tras la Tormenta (1995)

Willie Colón chronology
Hecho En Puerto Rico (1993)	Tras La Tormenta (1995)	Y Vuelve Otra Vez!!! (1996)

Rubén Blades chronology
Amor y Control (1992)	Tras La Tormenta (1995)	La Rosa de los Vientos (1996)

Singles from Tras La Tormenta
- 1. "Como un Huracán" Released: May 1995; 2. "Tras la Tormenta" Released: 10 August 1995

Tras la Tormenta (transl. "After the Storm") is the fifth and final collaborative studio album made between the American singer Willie Colón and the Panamanian Songwriter Rubén Blades. It was released on January 31, 1995, through Sony Tropical, Epic Records and Columbia Records. Recorded at Acme Recordings Studios, it had four singles, "Talento De Televisión", "Homenaje A Héctor Lavoe", "Tras La Tormenta" and "Como Un Huracán." It is considered one of the most successful salsa albums. They were also nominated for in the 38th Annual Grammy Awards for Grammy Award For Best Tropical Latin Album and reached the third spot in Billboard's Tropical Albums chart.

== Background ==
The album was recorded after a 10 year-long hiatus between Blades and Colon, following disagreements with the album The Last Fight (1984). It was released after both Colón and Blades had issued their own commercially successful records, Hecho en Puerto Rico (1993) and Amor y Control (1992), respectively. At no point during the recording of the album were Colón and Blades in the same studio, a circumstance that would not change until 2003, when they celebrated the 20th anniversary of their second collaborative album, Siembra.

== Sony Music intervention ==
The intervention of Sony Music was proposed in a humorous way by Blades himself, due to his intention to thank Colón for entering him into the world of music in 1977 with his album Metiendo Mano!, although Colón accepted the project did not come out as expected being in different studios at the time of recording the album.

== Singles ==
=== Talento De Televisión ===
It was written by Amílcar Boscán inspired by the actress Yuyito, saying that it was born from "everyday phenomena that are usually forgotten". He also said that when he watched television in the 1990s there was a Venezuelan television program called Super Sábado Sensacional where the Argentine model "Yuyito" was, who is really Amalia González. It was also said that it was Jennifer López but it was ruled out by Amílcar Boscán himself.

=== Homenaje A Héctor Lavoe ===
This is the song where the album opens. Fingering the trombone for 40 seconds where Colón and Lavoe leaned on to achieve fame.

== Track listing ==
This list has been adapted from Apple Music.

All tracks are written by Rubén Blades, except where noted.

Tras La Tormenta track listing
No.	Title	Writer(s)	Performer(s)	Length
1.	"Homenaje a Héctor Lavoe"	Cucco Peña; Fernando Rosario	Willie Colón	5:18
2.	"Como un Huracán"	Rubén Blades	Rubén Blades	5:12
3.	"Caer en Gracia"	Amílcar Boscán	Willie Colón	4:26
4.	"Todo o Nada"	Rubén Blades	Rubén Blades	5:14
5.	"Dale Paso"	Janet Becerra	Willie Colón	5:49
6.	"Desahucio"	Rubén Blades; Tite Curet Alonso	Rubén Blades	5:16
7.	"Doña Lele"	Rubén Blades	Rubén Blades; Willie Colón	4:30
8.	"Oye"	Rubén Blades	Rubén Blades	4:30
9.	"Talento de Televisión"	Amílcar Boscán	Willie Colón	4:41
10.	"Tras la Tormenta"	Rubén Blades	Rubén Blades; Willie Colón	6:32
Total length:				52:32

== Staff ==
Musicians and general producers, adapted from AudioKat:

=== Performers credits ===
- Andreu Johnny Almendra: Percussion, Timbales
- Rubén Blades: Performer, Producer, Vocals (Background)
- Milton Cardona: Conga, Vocals (Background)
- Willie Colón: Arranger, Producer, Trombone, Vocals, Vocals (Background)
- Sal Cuevas: Bass
- Eddy Ganz: Vocals (Background)
- Oscar Hernandez: Director, Mixing, Piano, Producer
- Louis Kahn: Trombone
- Luis Lopez: Trombone
- Jose Mangual Jr.: Bongos, Guitar, Maracas, Vocals (Background)
- Leopoldo Pineda: Trombone
- Nestor Sanchez: Vocals (Background)
- Prof. Joe Torres: Piano
- Tite Curet: Composer

=== Technicals credits ===
- Ricardo Betancourt: Photography
- Rory Young: Engineer, Mixing
- Ted Jensen: Mastering
- Isidro Infante: Producer
- Marty Sheller: Arranger
- Tite Curet: Composer
- Humberto Ramírez: Arranger
- Mario Houben: Art Direction, Design
- Cucco Peña: Arranger, Producer
- Shari Weingarten: Assistant Engineer

== Certifications ==
Region	Certification	Certified units/sales
United States (RIAA)	Platinum (Latin)	60,000^{‡}
^{‡} Sales+streaming figures based on certification alone.
