= Grammy Award for Best Latin Recording =

Award presented from 1976 to 1983

The Grammy Award for Best Latin Recording was conceived and lobbied for by then NYC NARAS Chapter Board Member, salsa pianist, composer, arranger, and bandleader, Larry Harlow. Through his gathering of 100,000 signatures and protesting in front of the Uris Theater in Manhattan it finally became a reality. It was presented from 1976 to 1983 and primarily encompassed progressive salsa and Latin-oriented jazz recordings. Starting from 1984 the Latin field was expanded to Grammy Award for Best Latin Pop Album, Best Tropical Performance (encompassing salsa and merengue), and Best Mexican/Mexican American Performance. Its first winner was Eddie Palmieri for the album, Sun of Latin Music.

Years reflect the year in which the Grammy Awards were presented, for works released in the previous year.

== 1980s ==
Year	Winner	Nominations	Source
1983	Machito and His Salsa Big Band '82 by Machito	Rhythm of Life by Ray Barretto; Canciones del Solar de los Aburridos by Willie Colón and Rubén Blades; Escenas de Amor by José Feliciano; Momentos by Julio Iglesias	
1982	Guajita Pa' La Jeva by Clare Fischer	Gózame! Pero Yu... by Cal Tjader; Summertime Digital at Montreaux, 1980 by Dizzy Gillespie with Mongo Santamaría; Eddie Palmieri by Eddie Palmieri; Brazilian Soul by Laurindo Almeida and Charlie Byrd	
1981	La Onda Va Bien by Cal Tjader Sextet	Irakere 2 by Irakere; Hey! by Julio Iglesias; Rican/Struction by Ray Barretto; Dancemania '80 by Tito Puente	
1980	Irakere by Irakere	Cross Over by Fania All-Stars; Touching You, Touching Me by Airto Moreira; Eternos by Celia Cruz and Johnny Pacheco	

== 1970s ==
Year	Winner	Nominations	Source
1979	Homenaje a Beny Moré by Tito Puente	Lucumi, Macumba, Voodoo by Eddie Palmieri; Coro Miyare by Fania All-Stars; Laurindo Almeida Trio by Laurindo Almeida; Mongo a la Carte by Mongo Santamaría; La Raza Latina by Orchestra Harlow	
1978	Dawn by Mongo Santamaría	Muy Amigos/Close Friends by Eydie Gormé and Danny Rivera; Fire Works by Machito Orchestra with Lalo Rodríguez; Tomorrow: Barretto Live by Ray Barretto Band; La Leyenda by Tito Puente	
1977	Unfinished Masterpiece by Eddie Palmieri	La Gormé by Eydie Gormé; Salsa - Soundtrack by Fania All-Stars; Cocinando la Salsa by Joe Cuba; El Maestro by Johnny Pacheco; Sofrito by Mongo Santamaría	
1976	Sun of Latin Music by Eddie Palmieri	Paunetto's Point by Bobby Paunetto "Quieres Ser Mi Amante" by Camilo Sesto; Fania All-Stars Live at Yankee Stadium, Vol. 1 by Fania All-Stars; Afro-Indio by Mongo Santamaría; Barretto by Ray Barretto; The Good, the Bad and the Ugly by Willie Colón	

== See also ==
- Grammy Award for Best Latin Pop Album
