= Comedia (album) =

1978 studio album by Héctor Lavoe

Studio album by Héctor Lavoe
- Released: 1978
- Genre: Salsa
- Label: Fania
- Producer: Willie Colón

Héctor Lavoe chronology
| De Ti Depende (1976) | Comedia (1978) | Feliz Navidad (1979) |

Professional ratings
Review scores
| Source | Rating |
|---|---|
| AllMusic | 4/5 stars |

Comedia (Comedy) is the third solo album by the Puerto Rican musician Héctor Lavoe. It was released in 1978 under the label of Fania Records. It is notable for the song "El Cantante", which was written by Rubén Blades. In 2006, Hispanic included the album on its list of 10 classic salsa albums. The album was named one of the 50 greatest salsa albums of all time by Rolling Stone in October 2024.

== Track listing ==
1. "El Cantante" – 10:23
2. "Comedia" - 3:28
3. "La Verdad" - 5:30
4. "Tiempos Pasados" - 4:26
5. "Bandolera" - 9:32
6. "¿Por Qué Te Conocí?" - 4:47
7. "Songoro Cosongo" - 7:50

== Personnel ==
- Héctor Lavoe - Vocals
- Salvador Cuevas - Bass
- Gilberto Colon - Piano
- Jose Rodriguez - Trombone
- Reinaldo Jorge - Trombone
- Luis E. Ortiz - Trumpet
- Jose Febles - Trumpet
- Milton Cardona - Conga ("El Cantante" & "La Verdad" only)
- Eddie Montalvo - Conga
- Steve Berrios - Timbales & Percussion ("El Cantante" & "La Verdad" only)
- Jose Cigno - Drums (except "El Cantante" & "La Verdad")
- Alfredo De La Fé - Violin ("El Cantante")

Coros:

- Jose Mangual
- Milton Cardona
- Willie Colón
- Eddie Natal
- Héctor Lavoe
- Recorded at La Tierra Sound Studios, New York City
- Audio Engineers: Jon Fausty, Mario Salvati, Irv Greenbaum
- Mixed by: Willie Colón
- "Bandolera" mixed by Jon Fausty
- Produced by Willie Colón
- Willie Colón (Arrangements)
- Luis Ortiz (Arrangements)
- José Febles (Arrangements)
- Edwin Rodríguez (Arrangements)
