= Tiburón (song) =

Rubén Blades song

Song by Willie Colón and Rubén Blades

from the album Canciones del Solar de los Aburridos
- Language: Spanish
- English title: Shark
- Genre: Salsa
- Length: 7:00
- Label: Fania Records
- Songwriter: Rubén Blades

"Tiburón" (Spanish: Shark) is a salsa song by Rubén Blades and Willie Colón which appeared on their 1981 album Canciones del Solar de los Aburridos. The song is a metaphor for American intervention in Latin America, with the titular shark representing the influence of American perceived imperialism in the region.

The song opens by evoking the sounds of a Caribbean beach, which then comes under threat by a shark hunting for victims. Throughout the second half of the song, the singers shout the phrase, "si lo ven que viene, ¡palo al tiburón!" ("If you see him coming, [bring a] stick to the shark!"). The lyrics specifically call for protecting "our sister El Salvador", in reference to US involvement in then ongoing Salvadoran Civil War. The shark metaphor has been described as being inspired by Juan Jose Arévalo's 1956 book The Shark and the Sardines.

== Reception ==
Music critic Dave Marsh listed "Tiburón" as one of his top 20 political songs written after 1976, calling it "the original anti-Central America invasion protest." At the time of its release, it received little airplay in the US because of its controversial political message, with Blades being accused of sympathizing with communism and becoming particularly unpopular with the Cuban community in Miami.

Blades would later state that "I was out of the radio for fifteen years in [the US] because of ‘Tiburon’.” In a 1991 interview, Colón said that politically charged songs like "Tiburón" and "Pedro Navaja" were so controversial that he and Blades occasionally performed them in bulletproof vests.

Blades confirmed that "the purpose of the song was to express my - and our - dislike for intervention[ism]" in reaction to US foreign policy in Latin America, and characterized it as "an anti-imperialist song". However, he sought to distance himself from radical Anti-Americanism among the Latin American Left, stressing that "Tiburón" is "not a song that can be applied exclusively to the US" by noting that it also lent itself to criticism of the United Kingdom in the 1982 Falklands War, and that it would have equally well have applied to a hypothetical Russian military intervention in Latin America.
