= Cantares del Subdesarrollo =

Studio album by Rubén Blades
- Released: August 17, 2009
- Recorded: 2008–2009
- Studio: Studios PYT (Panama City)
- Genre: Latin pop, bolero, salsa, son montuno
- Label: Rubén Blades Productions
- Producer: Rubén Blades

Rubén Blades chronology
A Man And His Music: Poeta del Pueblo (2008)	Cantares del Subdesarrollo (2009)	Tangos (2014)

Cantares del Subdesarrollo (Songs of Underdevelopment) is the ninth solo album by the panamanian swinger Rubén Blades released on August 17, 2009 by Rubén Blades Productions. The album earned Blades a Latin Grammy Award for Best Singer-Songwriter Album. The album highlights songs like Las Calles that would be included in his 2015 album "Son de Panamá". El Tartamudo and El Reto also stand out.

According to the back cover of the album Blades mentions that the album is dedicated especially to Cuba.

== Track listing ==
This information adapted from Allmusic.

All tracks are written by Rubén Blades.

No.	Title	Length
1.	"Las Calles"	3:35
2.	"País Portátil"	3:33
3.	"El Tartamudo"	5:32
4.	"El Reto"	3:43
5.	"Olaya"	3:05
6.	"Segunda Mitad del Noveno"	5:01
7.	"Bendición"	3:44
8.	"Moriré"	3:45
9.	"Símbolo"	3:08
10.	"Himno de los Olvidados"	1:22
11.	"Símbolo [Versión Panamá]"	3:43
