= Marty Sheller =

American jazz trumpeter

Marty Sheller (March 15, 1940, in Newark, New Jersey – September 17, 2022) was an American jazz trumpeter and arranger, who plays primarily in latin jazz idioms.

Sheller initially studied percussion, but switched to trumpet as a teenager. He played with Hugo Dickens in Harlem, and arranged for Sabu Martinez, and began working with Afro-Latin percussionists such as Louie Ramirez and Frankie Malabe. In 1962 he became a trumpeter in Mongo Santamaria's band, and worked with Santamaria for more than forty years as a composer and arranger. He also had an extensive association with Fania Records as a house arranger, working with Joe Bataan, Ruben Blades, Willie Colon, Larry Harlow, Hector Lavoe, and Ismael Miranda. Outside of Fania, he arranged for musicians such as George Benson, David Byrne, Jon Faddis, Giovanni Hidalgo, T.S. Monk, Idris Muhammad, Manny Oquendo, Dave Pike, Tito Puente, Shirley Scott, Woody Shaw, Lew Soloff, and Steve Turre. In the 2000s, he led his own ensemble, which included the sidemen Chris Rogers, Joe Magnarelli, Sam Burtis, Bobby Porcelli, Bob Franceschini, Oscar Hernández, Ruben Rodriquez, Vince Cherico, and Steve Berrios.
