= Oscar Hernández (musician) =

American pianist, arranger and producer

- Born: March 22, 1954 (age 72); New York City, New York, U.S.
- Genre: Salsa
- Occupations: Musician, arranger, producer
- Instrument: Piano

Oscar Hernández (born March 22, 1954) is an American pianist, arranger and producer of Puerto Rican descent.

== Life and career ==
=== Early years ===
Hernández's family moved to the United States from Puerto Rico in the 1940s, in search of a better way of life. They settled down in the South Bronx, a ghetto, which is a section that is heavily populated by latinos in New York, where Hernández was born. Hernández, who was the youngest of eleven siblings, received his primary and secondary education in the city's public school system.

=== Early musical influences ===
As a child he was exposed to the music of Tito Puente, Tito Rodríguez and Willie Colón among others. He would also sneak into nightclubs to watch and listen to the music of Ray Barretto, Eddie Palmieri and Richie Ray. Hernández was determined to leave the ghetto after witnessing the death of one of his brothers. In 1966, he took trumpet playing classes at a local Boys Club. Two years later someone gave his brother a piano, which he kept in the basement of the apartment building where the family lived. Some of the local musicians, who would get together and jam in the basement, showed Hernández the basics of piano playing; the rest was self-taught.

=== Recording debut ===
Hernández began playing with some local bands, among them was Joey Pastrana and La Conquistadora, with whom he made his recording debut with "Don Pastrana". In 1972, he was hired by Ismael Miranda and after playing with Miranda he went to work for Ray Barretto. With Barretto, he gained experience in musical arrangements and was introduced to the jazz music of Charlie Parker and Dizzy Gillespie. Hernández played an instrumental role in the recording of "Rican Struction", which is considered as a Latin classic. After six years with Barretto, he met Rubén Blades and joined his group Seis Del Solar.

Hernández enrolled in the City University of New York. His professors were lenient because they understood that he was often on tour, Eventually he earned his bachelor's degree in Music. Hernández has performed with Tito Puente, Celia Cruz, Julio Iglesias, Juan Luis Guerra, Willie Colón, Oscar D'León and for the groups Libre and Folkorico Experimental. He also produced records for Rubén Blades, Willie Colón, Daniel Ponce, Rafael DeJesus, Eddie Torres and Phil Hernandez.

=== The Spanish Harlem Orchestra ===
Hernández was the founder, music director and pianist for the Spanish Harlem Orchestra. This came about when he met Aaron Levinson, a music producer who had a contract with Warner Brothers. The idea of forming a group came about and the Spanish Harlem Orchestra was born. The group received a Grammy Award nomination in 2002 for "Best Salsa Album, a Billboard Award in 2003 for "Salsa Album of the year and in 2005 a Grammy Award for "Best Salsa Album".

=== Broadway musical The Capeman ===
Musician Paul Simon asked Hernández to arrange and produce the music for the Broadway musical The Capeman, which is based on the real-life story of Salvador Agron. His work also required that he be the musical director and conductor. Hernández was the musical director and arranger for the theatre shows Quien mató a Héctor Lavoe (Who murdered Héctor Lavoe) and La Lupe.

Hernández played piano on the theme score for the HBO television series Sex and the City. He has also written the musical score for some of the commercial jingles for various companies, among them: Dunkin' Donuts, Waldbaums, General Motors and Covergirl.

=== Later years ===
Hernández, who is married with children, continues to be active with the Spanish Harlem Orchestra. He arranged the music for the documentaries If the Mango Tree Could Speak by Pat Gaudvis, Angélica tiene un bebé by Paula Heredia and Cuban Roots/Bronx Stories by Pam Sporn. In 2009, Hernández directed the recording of Songs of the Capeman with the participation of Obie Bermúdez, Danny Rivera, Ray de la Paz, Claudette Sierra and Frankie Negrón. In 2012, Shepherd University (Cornel School of Contemporary Music) awarded Hernández with an “Honorary Doctorate in Music Arts” for his lifelong work and commitment in the field of Afro-Latin music.

== Discography ==
External audio
- You may listen to Oscar Hernández performing at a Salsa Concert on YouTube.

Hernández has participated in the following recordings:

- Africando "Balboa" - Oscar Hernández, piano
- Africando "Gombo Salsa" - Oscar Hernández, piano
- Alfredo "Chocolate" Armenteros - Oscar Hernández, piano
- Roberto Torres & Alfredo "Chocolate" Armenteros - Oscar Hernández, piano
- Ray Barretto "Fuerza Gigante" - Oscar Hernández, piano
- Ray Barretto "Rhythm of Life" - Oscar Hernández, piano
- Ray Barretto "Rican/Struction" - Oscar Hernández, piano
- Ray Barretto "Tomorrow" - Oscar Hernández, piano
- Ray Barretto "Tremendo Trío" - Oscar Hernández, piano
- Rubén Blades "Agua de Luna" - Oscar Hernández, piano
- Rubén Blades "Buscando América" - Oscar Hernández, piano
- Rubén Blades "Caminando" - Oscar Hernández, piano
- Rubén Blades "Escenas" - Óscar Hernández, piano
- Rubén Blades "Rubén Blades y Son del Solar...Live!" - Oscar Hernández, piano
- Rubén Blades "Amor y Control" - Oscar Hernández, piano
- Rubén Blades "Nothing But The Truth" - Oscar Hernández, piano
- Rubén Blades/Willie Colón "Tras La Tormenta" - Oscar Hernández, producer
- Richie Cabo "Paisaje Musical" - Oscar Hernández, piano
- Carabali "Vol. 1" - Oscar Hernández, producer and arranger
- Carabali "Vol. II" - Oscar Hernández, producer and arranger
- Conjunto Libre - Oscar Hernández, piano
- Conjunto Libre "Con Salsa Con Ritmo" - Oscar Hernández, piano
- Conjunto Libre "Libre Increible" - Oscar Hernández, piano
- Rafael DeJesus "Twice As Good" - Oscar Hernández, producer and arranger
- Linda Eder "It's No Secret Anymore" - Oscar Hernández, piano
- Flex "Flex Y La Rumba" - Oscar Hernández, piano
- 4 Guys Named Jose - Oscar Hernández, producer and arranger
- Grupo Folklorico Experimental "Vol. I & II" - Oscar Hernández, piano
- Juan Luis Guerra - Oscar Hernández, piano
- Juan Luis Guerra "Areíto" - Oscar Hernández, piano
- Illegales "Dame De Eso Remix" - Oscar Hernández, piano
- Earl Klugh "Midnight In San Juan" - Oscar Hernández, piano
- Steve Kroon "In My Path" - Oscar Hernández, arranger and piano
- Latin Broadway - Oscar Hernández, music director and arranger
- Latin Jazz Highlights "Messidor Records Vol. 5" - Oscar Hernández, piano
- Ricardo Lemvo y Maquina Loca "Mambo Yoyo" - Oscar Hernández, piano
- Ivan Lins "Love Affair" - Oscar Hernández, piano
- Kirsty MacColl "Electric Landlady" - Oscar Hernández, piano
- Ismael Miranda "Así Se Compone Un Son" - Oscar Hernández, piano
- Ismael Miranda "No Voy Al Festival" - Oscar Hernández, piano
- Luis "Perico" Ortiz "Breaking The Rules" - Oscar Hernández, piano
- Luis "Perico" Ortiz "In Tradition" - Oscar Hernández, piano
- Johnny Pacheco "Sima" - Oscar Hernández, piano
- Daniel Ponce "Chango Te Llama" - Oscar Hernández, producer and arranger
- Domingo Quiñones "Quien Mato a Héctor Lavoe Cast Recording" - Oscar Hernández, piano
- Pete "El Conde" Rodríguez "Esté Negro SÍ Es Sabroso" - Oscar Hernández, piano
- Pete "El Conde" Rodriguez "Pueblo Latino" - Oscar Hernández, piano
- Tito Rodríguez "Eclipse" - Oscar Hernández, arranger and piano
- Mongo Santamaría "Mongo Returns" - Oscar Hernández, piano
- Seis Del Solar "Alternate Roots" - Oscar Hernández, co-leader and producer
- Seis Del Solar "Decision" - Oscar Hernández, co-leader and producer
- Paul Simon "Songs of the Capeman" - Oscar Hernández, producer and arranger
- Paul Simon "The Capeman Original Cast Recording" - Oscar Hernández, producer and arranger
- James "J.T." Taylor "A Brand New Me" - Oscar Hernández, piano
- The Bronx Horns "Catch The Feeling" - Oscar Hernández, piano
- The Bronx Horns "Silver In The Bronx" - Oscar Hernández, piano
- Eddie Torres "Dance City" - Oscar Hernández, producer and arranger
- Dave Valentin - Oscar Hernández, piano
- Dave Valentin "Mind Time" - Oscar Hernández, piano
- Dave Valentin "The Hawk" - Oscar Hernández, piano
- Dave Valentin "The Pied Piper" - Oscar Hernández, piano
- Dave Valentin "Tropic Heat" - Oscar Hernández, piano
- Orlando "Watussi" "Como Nunca" - Oscar Hernández, producer and arranger

== See also ==
- List of Puerto Ricans
