= Nothing but the Truth (Rubén Blades album) =

Studio album by Rubén Blades
- Released: 1988
- Genre: Latin rock
- Label: Elektra
- Producer: Tommy LiPuma, Carlos Rios, Rubén Blades, Lou Reed

Rubén Blades chronology
Doble Filo (1987)	Nothing but the Truth (1988)	Antecedente (1988)

Nothing but the Truth is an album by the Panamanian musician Rubén Blades, released in 1988. It was marketed as Blades's first album of entirely English-language songs. It peaked at No. 156 on the Billboard 200.

== Production ==
Blades signed a contract in 1983 to produce an English-language album. He contributed explanatory liner notes to each song and had the lyrics printed in Spanish and English. "Hopes on Hold", "Letters to the Vatican", and "The Calm Before the Storm" were cowritten by Blades and Lou Reed; they met on the video set for the song "Sun City". Blades invited Elvis Costello to his home in California to work on the two songs that they cowrote, "Shamed into Love" and "The Miranda Syndrome". "I Can't Say" was written by Sting. "The Letter" is directed to a friend who is suffering from AIDS. "Ollie's Doo Wop" criticizes the Iran–Contra affair in the form of a doo-wop song. "In Salvador" is about death squads in El Salvador. "Letters to the Vatican" is a story about an alcoholic woman who sends letters to Pope John Paul II. "The Hit" describes gang warfare in East Los Angeles, California. Paulinho da Costa played various percussive instruments on the album.

== Critical reception ==
Professional ratings
Review scores
Source	Rating
AllMusic	3.5/5 stars
Robert Christgau	B
The Encyclopedia of Popular Music	3/5 stars
MusicHound Rock: The Essential Album Guide	3.5/5 stars
Omaha World-Herald	3/5 stars
Orlando Sentinel	4/5 stars
The Rolling Stone Album Guide	3/5 stars

The New York Times said, "The songs' range of subject matter is matched by a musical diversity that runs from a capella rock-and-roll harmonizing to turbulent Latin-flavored rock. 'The Hit' ... has the sprawling grandeur of one of Bruce Springsteen's mid-70's mini-epics"; Stephen Holden later listed the album as the fifth best of 1988. The Chicago Sun-Times opined that "the strong musical identity of each of [Blades's] collaborators is both a strength of the album—giving it a distinctiveness that transcends the bland calculation of most crossover attempts—and its major weakness." The Toronto Star called the album "a genuinely eloquent cross-cultural phenomenon, blending salsa, reggae, rhythm 'n' blues, doo- wop, hard rock, Celtic folk elements and contemporary jazz". The Chicago Tribune lamented that Blades's "trademark sound ... is replaced by often strained lyrics backed by the thumping of electric bass and drums." Robert Christgau, noting the generic political songs, wrote dismissively, "just what WEA needed, another Jackson Browne album."

AllMusic said that "overall, [the music] would best be tagged as late-'80s MOR with a Latin lilt." Trouser Press opined that the Costello songs were the album's best tracks.

== Track listing ==
No.	Title	Length
1.	"The Hit"
2.	"I Can't Say"
3.	"Hopes on Hold"
4.	"The Miranda Syndrome"
5.	"Letters to the Vatican"
6.	"The Calm Before the Storm"
7.	"In Salvador"
8.	"The Letter"
9.	"Chameleons"
10.	"Ollie's Doo Wop"
11.	"Shamed into Love"
