= Tangos (album) =

Studio album by Rubén Blades
- Released: 24 June 2014
- Genre: Tango
- Length: 48:14
- Label: Sunnyside
- Producer: Carlos Franzetti

Rubén Blades chronology
| Eba Say Ajá (2012) | Tangos (2014) | Son de Panamá (2015) |

Tangos is a studio album by Panamanian musician Rubén Blades, it was released on June 24, 2014, through Sunnyside Records. The album consists of eleven new versions of compositions by Blades in the style of tango, it features produccion and arrangements by Argentine musician Carlos Franzetti and the participation of Leopoldo Federico's orquestra and the Prague Symphony Orchestra.

At the 15th Annual Latin Grammy Awards, the album was nominated for Album of the Year and won Best Tango Album. Also, the album won Best Latin Pop Album at the 57th Annual Grammy Awards.

== Background ==
The idea of releaseing tango versions of salsa songs began almost ten years prior to the album's release but the recording of it started at the 2010 World Tango Dance Tournament in Buenos Aires, where Blades performed some of the songs of the album with Carlos Franzetti. Five of the songs from the project were recorded in Argentina alongside the orchestra of Argentine bandoneon player Leopoldo Federico while the other six songs were recorded in New York with the Prague Symphony Orchestra.

About the decision of making the album, Blades said "I always considered that the atmosphere posed by tango, the way in which you have to phrase the songs and their instrumentation were going to give the lyrics from my songs a much more complete dimension than obtained by presenting them in the Afro-Cuban music format, in the genre that is commercially known as salsa".

== Track listing ==
All tracks were produced by Carlos Franzetti.

| No. | Title | Length |
|---|---|---|
| 1. | "Paula C" | 3:33 |
| 2. | "Ligia Elena" | 3:12 |
| 3. | "Ella" | 4:41 |
| 4. | "Pablo Pueblo" | 4:35 |
| 5. | "Pedro Navaja" | 5:55 |
| 6. | "Vida" | 3:58 |
| 7. | "Juana Mayo" | 4:08 |
| 8. | "Sebastian" | 4:14 |
| 9. | "Parao" | 4:35 |
| 10. | "Adan Garcia" | 4:10 |
| 11. | "Tiempos" | 4:42 |
| Total length: | | 48:14 |

== Credits ==
- Rubén Blades – vocals
- Carlos Franzetti – production, arreglos, piano eléctrico (6–11)
- Leopoldo Federico – bandoneon (1–5)
- Carlos Corrales – bandoneon (1–5)
- Federico Pereiro – bandoneon (1–5)
- Lautaro Greco – bandoneon (1–5)
- Damian Bolotin – violin (1–5)
- Pablo Agri – violin (1–5)
- Miguel Angel Bertero – violin (1–5)
- Brigita Danko – violin (1–5)
- Mauricio Svidovsky – violin (1–5)
- Benjamin Bru – viola (1–5)
- Diego Sánchez – cello (1–5)
- Nicolás Ledesma – piano (1–5)
- Horario Cabarcos – bass (1–5)
- Daniel Binelli – bandoneon (6–11)
- Leonardo Suarez Paz – violin (6–11)
- Francisco "Pancho" Navarro – guitar (6–11)
- Pedro Giraudo – bass (6–11)

== Charts ==
Weekly chart performance for Tangos
| Chart (2014) | Peak position |
|---|---|
| US Latin Pop Albums (Billboard) | 9 |
