= De Ti Depende =

1976 studio album by Héctor Lavoe

Studio album by Héctor Lavoe
- Released: 1976
- Genre: Salsa
- Length: 43:32
- Label: Fania
- Producer: Willie Colón

Héctor Lavoe chronology
La Voz (1975)	De Ti Depende (1976)	Comedia (1978)

De Ti Depende (It's Up to You) is the second solo album by Héctor Lavoe, released in 1976 under Fania Records. Its lead single, "Periodico de Ayer", is known as one of the most popular salsa songs ever.

== Track listing ==
No.	Title	Writer(s)	Length
1.	"Vamos a Reír un Poco"	Perucho Torcat	7:32
2.	"De Ti Depende"	Miguel Ángel Amadeo	4:33
3.	"Periódico de Ayer"	Catalino Curet Alonso	6:43
4.	"Consejo de Oro"	Arquímedes Arcidiácono	2:40
5.	"Tanto Como Ayer"	D.R.	3:42
6.	"Hacha y Machete"	Enildo "Chino" Padrón	5:41
7.	"Felices Horas"	Luis A. Pérez	6:04
8.	"Mentira"	Ignacio Piñeiro	6:37
Total length:			43:32

== Personnel ==
Arrangers

- Edwin Rodriguez (Tanto Como Ayer)
- Jose Febles (De Ti Depende)
- Louie Ramirez (Consejo de Oro)
- Louie Ortiz (Tanto Como Ayer), (Felices Horas)
- Willie Colón (Vamos a Reír un Poco), (Periódico de Ayer), (Mentira)

Musicians

- Bass – Santi Gonzalez
- Bongos – Jose Mangual Jr.
- Congas – Milton Cardona
- Guitar – Yomo Toro
- Piano – Joe "Profesor" Torres
- Trombone – Harry de Aguiar, Angel Vasquez
- Trumpet – Ray Feliciano
- Vocals and Chorus
- Lead vocals, maracas – Héctor Lavoe
- Chorus – Jose Mangual Jr., Milton Cardona, Rubén Blades, Willie Colón
- Percussion – Jose Mangual Jr., Milton Cardona

Production

- Producer – Willie Colón
- Executive producer – Jerry Masucci
- Engineer – Jon Fausty

Design and Photography

- Album design – Ron Levine
- Photography – Lee Marshall
