= Darysabel Isales =

Puerto Rican opera singer (1934–2023)

- Born: Darysabel Isales Canas; November 17, 1934; San Juan, Puerto Rico
- Died: January 16, 2023 (aged 88); San Juan, Puerto Rico
- Occupations: Singer, actress and educator
- Years active: 1952–2015
- Family: Carlos Isales (father), Isabel Canas (mother)

Darysabel Isales Canas (November 17, 1934 – January 16, 2023) was a Puerto Rican opera singer and actress. She was a soprano. As a singer, Isales performed in Puerto Rico, the United States, Spain, the Dominican Republic and Austria.

Isales took on an acting career later in her life. Among her most notable participations was the one she made in the Jacobo Morales directed picture, "Linda Sara", where she acted alongside Chayanne and Dayanara Torres, among others. In 2002, she participated along with Adamari Lopez, in the film "La Noche en Que Tumbaron al Campeon" ("The Night the Champion was Defeated").

== Early life ==
She was the daughter of Carlos Isales and of Isabel Canas, the latter of which from whom part of her first name (Darysabel) was derived.

Born in the Puerto Rican capital city of San Juan, Darysabel Isales was the first person in her family to demonstrate artistic talent, as her parents were not into the entertainment world. She was, however, encouraged by her parents to follow her dreams as soon as they discovered that she had talent to become a professional, lyrical soprano singer.

He graduated from Central High School of Santurce. When she was 18, Isales auditioned for the University of Puerto Rico's choir; Augusto Rodríguez, the institution's choir's director, enjoyed her voice so much that he recommended her to take singing classes with a teacher named María Esther Robles, with whom Isales developed a life-long friendship. Isales was accepted into the university choir and she also began taking human studies classes at that college.

== Career ==
With Isales, the choir had the chance of performing at the Carnegie Hall in New York City, marking Isales' United States debut as a singer. That concert led to her being discovered by teachers of the New England Conservatory of Music, so she moved to Boston, Massachusetts, to attend that institution. This was during 1952; Isales stayed in Boston until 1957, studying under singing teacher Gladys Miller. Isales participated at some shows during that era and became known around New England's operatic circuit. Despite graduating from the NECM in 1957, Isales decided to stay in the United States three additional years.

Isales returned to Puerto Rico in 1960, where she became an educator, teaching singing lessons at the Escuela Libre de Música there. At the same time, she performed at some concerts in that school, alongside well-known pianist Isabelita Carrasquillo. Carrasquillo was instrumental in Isales' European singing career, since she recommended Isales to Conchita Badía, who was a singing teacher at the Universidad de Santiago de Compostela in Santiago de Compostela, a city in Northwestern Spain. The Spaniiard government presented Isales with a scholarship so she could move to the Southern European country; Isales moved there in 1964 and studied at the Universidad de Santiago de Compostela in 1964 and 1965, singing with Badía in, among other places, the Hostal dos Reis Católicos.

Isales returned to Puerto Rico in order to continue teaching singing classes at the Escuela Libre de Música, but then an unexpected turn took place in her life: she was offered the opportunity of traveling to Austria to advance her singing career there by the Puerto Rican Masons. She accepted and went on to further her knowledge of her musical genre in Vienna under teacher Frau Lily Colar. In Austria, she became an opera star and gave concerts for a period of two years.

Isales once again returned to Puerto Rico, and she auditioned for the Ópera de Puerto Rico theatrical company. She was hired by them, and for the next few years, she performed in such plays as "El Barbero de Sevilla" ("The Sevilla Barber", where she shared the stage with Marta Márquez, among others), "La Travieta", "Macbeth", "Bodas de Fígaro", "Hanzel y Gretel" and others.

Isales was invited by playwright and director Pablo Cabrera to join the "Teatro del 60" ("60s Theater", a theatrical company which included, among others, actor Luis Oliva) which she did. With "Teatro del 60", she continued expanding her acting resume, and notably played the role of "Doña Pura Buenaventura" in "La Verdadera Historia de Pedro Navaja". a play which allowed her to act in the Dominican Republic at the Teatro Nacional de la Republica Dominicana in 1982, and back in New York, at the New York Public Theater in 1985. In 1986, also at New York, she acted at Central Park's Delacorte Theater.

In 1985, she acted in Puerto Rico on a play named "Doña Francisqūita", as the titular role. Her characterization earned her high critical acclaim from such sources as La Opinion newspaper in Los Angeles, California, which said that she made a "magistral interpretation".

Towards the late 80s and early 90s, Isales developed a television acting career, immersing herself in the world of telenovela and comedy acting in Puerto Rico, including "La Otra" ("The Other Woman"), which was a well-known telenovela in the island-country, as well as "Mujeres" ("Women") and others. She also acted in theater in the central Puerto Rican town of Cayey.

In 1994, Isales took on what is perhaps her best known role, when she acted in the Jacobo Morales film, "Linda Sara".

In 2004, Isales reprised her role as "Doña Pura" in Lolyn Paz's production of "La Verdadera Historia de Pedro Navaja", which this time was played at the Centro de Bellas Artes theater in the central Puerto Rican city of Caguas.

== Later years ==
She retired from her career as a singing teacher in 2015 and moved to an elderly residing facility in Levittown, Toa Baja, Puerto Rico in 2020. She died at age 88, after a short stay at a San Juan-area hospital, on January 16, 2023.

One of her students as a singing teacher was the Puerto Rican bolero singer, Michelle Brava, who also herself played Miss Buenaventura in a version of "Lo que le Paso a Pedro Navaja".
