= Walter Flores (musician) =

Costa Rican musician

Walter Flores is a Costa Rican musician. He has won five Grammy Awards, two of them for producing the albums Tiempos (1999) and Mundo (2002), by Ruben Blades.
