= Antecedente =

Studio album by Rubén Blades
- Released: 1988
- Recorded: 1987–1988
- Genre: Salsa
- Length: 39:03
- Label: Elektra
- Producer: Rubén Blades; Eddie Maldonado

Rubén Blades chronology
| Nothing but the Truth (1988) | Antecedente (1988) | Rubén Blades y Son del Solar ... Live! (1990) |

Antecedente (Antecedent) is an album by the Panamanian musician Rubén Blades (credited with Son del Solar), released in 1988. The album was often reviewed with La Pistola y El Corazón, by Los Lobos, which also was a return-to-roots effort.

The album won a Grammy Award for "Best Tropical Latin Performance". It peaked at No. 8 on Billboard's Tropical Albums chart.

== Production ==
The album was produced by Blades. His backing band changed its name from Seis del Solar to Son del Solar, with trombones replacing some of the synthesizer parts. Antecedente marked a return to salsa for Blades, who had remarked that he did not like how older studio recording techniques made the music sound.

== Critical reception ==
Professional ratings
Review scores
| Source | Rating |
|---|---|
| AllMusic | 4/5 stars |
| Robert Christgau | B+ |
| The Encyclopedia of Popular Music | 4/5 stars |
| MusicHound Rock: The Essential Album Guide | 3.5/5 stars |
| The Philadelphia Inquirer | 4/4 stars |
| The Rolling Stone Album Guide | 4.5/5 stars |

Robert Christgau wrote that "Blades augments a revamped, renamed Seis del Solar with salsa trombones and begets a dance album for the people of Panama." Trouser Press deemed the album "rewardingly rootsy." The St. Petersburg Times called it "a hot-blooded, no-nonsense salsa-style record brimming with gliding Latin rhythms, layers of punchy percussion and a relentless two-trombone backdrop—all topped off by Blades' plucky tenor." The New York Times determined that "the music is full of life, trading away letter-perfect period authenticity for heartfelt spirit."

The Washington Post considered the songs to be "not the fast, dizzying dance workouts of the barrio dance halls but a more sinuous sound that can accommodate both his evocative lyrics and his hypnotic syncopation." The Globe and Mail labeled the album "a collection of dance tunes that forgo his usual political commentary for songs of love—of women, neighborhood and country."

AllMusic called the album a "return to exuberant, dance-oriented salsa."

== Track listing ==
| No. | Title | Length |
|---|---|---|
| 1. | "Juana Mayo (A Woman's Name)" |
| 2. | "Noches Del Ayer (Caledonia Nights)" |
| 3. | "Tas Caliente (You're Hot)" |
| 4. | "Nuestro Adiós (Our Farewell)" |
| 5. | "La Marea (The Tide)" |
| 6. | "Nacer de Tí (Born from You)" |
| 7. | "Contrabando (Contraband)" |
| 8. | "Plaza Herrera (Herrera Plaza)" |
| 9. | "Patria (Motherland)" |

== Personnel ==
- Mastering – Bob Ludwig
- Quinto, Tumbadora – Bobby Allende
- Photography – Christine Rodin
- Design – Janet Perr
- Engineer, Mixing – Jon Fausty
- Mixing – Judy Kirschner
- Composer – Luis Franco
- Bongos, Campana, Guitar, Tumbadora – Marc Quiñones
- Arranger, Bass, Synthesizer – Michael Vinas
- Background Vocals – Nestor Sanchez
- Arranger, Piano, Synthesizer – Oscar Hernandez
- Trombone – Papo Vasquez
- Guest Artist, Percussion, Timbales – Ralph Irizarry
- Trombone – Reynaldo Jorge
- Composer, Engineer, Maracas, Mixing, Primary Artist, Producer, Vocals, Background Vocals – Rubén Blades
- Primary Artist – Rubén Blades y Seis del Solar
- Primary Artist – Rubén Blades y Son del Solar
- Mixing – Shawna Stobie
- Guest Artist – Tito Allen
