= Realidades (TV series) =

1975–1977 American documentary series

Realidades is a PBS TV series of 30 minute documentary and arts programming, showcasing Hispanic artists, which aired on WNET Channel 13 New York from 1975 to 1977. Salsa musician Willie Colón was music director of the series; he included the theme tunes on his 1975 album The Good, the Bad, the Ugly.
