= The Last Fight (film) =

- Directed by: Fred Williamson
- Written by: Fred Williamson
- Produced by: Fred Williamson
- Starring: Willie Colón; Ruben Blades; Fred Williamson; Darlanne Fluegel; Joe Spinell
- Release date: September 9, 1983
- Running time: 86 minutes
- Country: United States
- Language: English

The Last Fight is a 1983 American film directed by Fred Williamson.

== Plot ==
A singer-turned-boxer signs a contract with a shady promoter. The boxer turns against the promoter and seeks revenge when the promoter's thugs kill his girlfriend when he tries backing out of the contract.

== Cast ==
- Willie Colón as Joaquin Vargas
- Rubén Blades as Andy "Kid Clave" Perez
- Fred Williamson as Jesse Crowder
- Darlanne Fluegel as Sally
- Anthony Sirico as Frankie
- Joe Spinell as Angelo, the boss
- Nereida Mercado as Nancy
- Vinny Argiro as Detective Pantano
- Sal Carollo as Papa
- Andy Gerado as Frank
- Izzy Sanabria as "Slim"
- Alex Stevens as Sal
- Kurt Andon as doctor
- Marta Viana as Mama
- Darlene Masucci as pretty girl at party
- Salvador Sánchez as himself
- Don King as himself
- José Torres as himself
- Bert Sugar (credited as Bert Sugarman) as himself
- Tony Perez as himself
- Celia Cruz, Héctor Lavoe and Johnny Pacheco as themselves
