= Caminando (Rubén Blades song) =

Single by Rubén Blades & Son del Solar

from the album Caminando
- Released: 1991
- Recorded: 1991
- Genre: Salsa
- Length: 2:43
- Label: Columbia; CBS
- Songwriter(s): Rubén Blades
- Producer(s): Rubén Blades; Oscar Hernandez

Rubén Blades & Son del Solar singles chronology
"Todos Vuelven" (1989)	"Caminando" (1991)	"Camaleón" (1991)

"Caminando" is a 1991 song by Rubén Blades and his band Son del Solar, written by Blades. It is also the title track and one of three singles (with "Prohibido olvidar" and "Camaleón") from Caminando, a 1991 album which saw Blades briefly return from fusion styles to purer coro-driven salsa. The song has been covered by many artists Coque Malla on Canta a Rubén Blades. The 1991 song in 1994 became Blades' signature tune on his foray into Panamanian politics co-founding the Papa Egoró party.

The lyrics of the song commence: "Caminando, se aprende en la vida / Caminando, se sabe lo que es / Caminando, se cura la herida / Caminando, que deja el ayer".

The single was released as 7" on Columbia, and as a 12", 33 ⅓ RPM (Sony Discos Inc. EPS 81608) with Caminando (Extended Remix) 4:53 remixed by Javier Garza and Pablo Flores.
