= Buscando América =

Studio album by Rubén Blades & Seis Del Solar
- Released: 1984
- Recorded: May, July, August 1983
- Studio: Eurosound (New York City)
- Genres: Salsa; reggae; Latin jazz; rock
- Label: Elektra
- Producer: Ruben Blades

Rubén Blades & Seis Del Solar chronology
The Last Fight (1982)	Buscando América (1984)	Escenas (1985)

Buscando América (Searching for America) is the first album by Rubén Blades and Seis del Solar, released in 1984. The production, under the Elektra label, fuses different musical rhythms such as salsa, reggae, rock, and jazz Latin. The album was recorded at Eurosound Studios in New York between May and August 1983.

With songs having political and social content and given their content of political questioning, some tracks had problems being broadcast on the radio; such as "Desapariciones", later covered by other musicians. The album received a Grammy nomination for Best Tropical Latin Performance.

== Production ==
The album was recorded with the six musicians of Seis Del Solar. The lyrics were printed inside the album in both Spanish and English.

== Critical reception ==
Professional ratings
Review scores
Source	Rating
AllMusic	4/5 stars
Christgau's Record Guide	A−
The Encyclopedia of Popular Music	4/5 stars
MusicHound Rock: The Essential Album Guide	4.5/5 stars
The Rolling Stone Album Guide	5/5 stars

The New York Times wrote that "the musicians, most of whom have labored for years on the salsa circuit, respond to Mr. Blades's creativity and risk-taking with some of the freshest, most impressive playing heard on a pop album this year." Trouser Press wrote that Buscando América "stands as the finest of his major-label recordings to date."

The Pazz & Jop 1984 all critics poll ranked in the 18th position. Time named the album one of 1984's best. The album was named one of the 50 greatest salsa albums of all time by Rolling Stone in October 2024. In the list Los 600 de Latinoamérica, an acclaimed ranking created by several Latin American music journalists, it was ranked the thirteenth best album on the list, which covers the years 1920 to 2022.

== Track listing ==
All tracks are written by Rubén Blades, except where noted.

No.	Title	Writer(s)	Length
1.	"Decisiones"		5:00
2.	"GDBD"		3:35
3.	"Desapariciónes"		6:20
4.	"Todos Vuelven"	César Miró	4:26
5.	"Caminos Verdes"		3:00
6.	"El Padre Antonio y el Monaguillo Andrés"		8:02
7.	"Buscando América"		8:38

== Personnel ==
- Rubén Blades: vocals, acoustic guitar, maracas

Seis del Solar

- Mike Viñas: electric guitar, bass, backing vocals
- Oscar Hernandez: piano
- Eddie Montalvo: drums, percussion
- Louie Rivera: bongo, percussion, backing vocals
- Ralph Irizarry: timpani, percussion
- Ricardo Marrero: vibraphone
- Ray Adams: drums
