= The Good, the Bad, the Ugly (Willie Colón album) =

1975 studio album by Willie Colón

Studio album by Willie Colón
- Released: 27 April 1975
- Recorded: 1974
- Studio: Good Vibrations, Broadway, New York
- Genre: Salsa
- Length: 32:28
- Language: Spanish
- Label: Fania
- Producer: Willie Colón

Willie Colón chronology
Se Chavó el Vecindario! (1975)	The Good, the Bad, the Ugly (1975)	Metieno Mano! (1977)

Singles from The Good, the Bad, The Ugly
- 1. ""Toma" / "MC2 (Theme for Realidades)"" Released: May 14, 1975

Professional ratings
Review scores
Source	Rating
AllMusic	4.5/5 stars
MusicHound World	4/5 stars

The Good, the Bad, the Ugly is the ninth studio album by American singer and trombonist Willie Colón with backing from Yomo Toro on cuatro and vocal contributions from his regular singer Héctor Lavoe and Lavoe's replacement Rubén Blades. The album featured three cover art portraits by Ron Levine of Yomo Toro ("the Good"), Colón ("the Bad") and Lavoe ("the Ugly") but not Blades, punning the film The Good, the Bad and the Ugly. Lavoe recorded his tracks on return from Kinshasa in Zaire. It was to be Lavoe's last collaboration for a period after a successful series with Colón as he issued his first solo album La Voz. For Blades it was his second album after 1970's De Panama a New York, also for Fania, and marked the start of a collaboration with Colón which would continue for several albums.

== Track listing ==
No.	Title	Writer(s)	Vocals	Length
1.	"Toma"	Public domain	Willie Colón	2:17
2.	"Potpourri III"	Public domain	Héctor Lavoe	3:20
3.	"Cua Cua Ra, Cua Cua"	Baden Powell	Willie Colón	3:25
4.	"Doña Toña"	Willie Colón	instrumental	3:43
5.	"MC^{2} (Theme Realidades)"	Willie Colón	instrumental	3:43
6.	"El Cazangero"	Rubén Blades	Rubén Blades	4:01
7.	"Guaracha"	Willie Colón	Willie Colón	5:05
8.	"I Feel Campesino (Theme Realidades)"	Willie Colón	instrumental	3:29
9.	"Qué Bien Te Ves"	Willie Colón	Héctor Lavoe	3:35

== Personnel ==
- Choir/Chorus, Main Personnel, Vocals - Ada Chabrier
- Main Personnel, Trumpet - Antonio Montagna
- Main Personnel, Alto Saxophone - Bobby Porcelli
- Bass, Bass Guitar, Main Personnel - Eddie Rivera
- Electric Guitar, Main Personnel - Elliott Randall
- Main Personnel, Trombone - Eric Matos
- Choir/Chorus, Main Personnel, Vocals - Ernie Agosto
- Primary Artist, Vocals - Héctor Lavoe
- Piano - Joe Torres
- Audio Engineer, Engineer - Jon Fausty
- Bongos, Percussion - Jose Mangual
- Bongos, Choir/Chorus, Main Personnel, Vocals - Jose Mangual Jr.
- Drums, Main Personnel - José Cigno
- Original Photography, Photography - Lee Marshall
- Main Personnel, Trumpet - Lew Soloff
- Main Personnel, Timbales - Louie "Timbalito" Romero
- Main Personnel, Baritone Saxophone - Mario Rivera
- Arranger - Marty Sheller
- Congas, Main Personnel, Percussion - Milton Cardona
- Main Personnel, Percussion - Prof. Joe Torres
- Main Personnel, Percussion - Ray Armando
- Main Personnel, Piano - Rodgers Grant
- Artwork, Cover Design, Design - Ron Levine
- Choir/Chorus, Main Personnel, Vocals - Rubén Blades
- Bass Guitar, Main Personnel - Santi "Choflomo" Gonzalez
- Liner Notes - Thomas Muriel
- Main Personnel, Trombone, Tuba - Tom "Bones" Malone
- Arranger, Audio Production, Choir/Chorus, Leader, Main Personnel, Primary Artist, Producer, Trombone, Vocals - Willie Colon
- Cuatro, Main Personnel - Yomo Toro
