= Sur Caribe =

Sur Caribe is a band from Santiago de Cuba. Its director Ricardo Leyva who writes most of the songs, joined in 1987.

== Discography ==
- Con Tó (2002)
- Caminando (2004)
- Credenciales (2005)
- Horizonte Próximo (mp3 2009; CD & DVD set 2010)
