= The Last Fight (album) =

1982 studio album by Willie Colón & Rubén Blades

Studio album by Willie Colón and Rubén Blades
- Released: 1982
- Recorded: New York City
- Genre: Salsa
- Label: Fania
- Producers: Willie Colón, Rubén Blades

Rubén Blades and Willie Colón chronology
Canciones del Solar de los Aburridos (1981)	The Last Fight (1982)	Tras La Tormenta (1995)

The Last Fight is the fourth collaborative studio album by Willie Colón and Rubén Blades, released by Fania Records in 1982. It is the soundtrack to the film The Last Fight, starring Rubén Blades in his film acting debut.

== Background ==
The Last Fight is the fourth of five collaborative albums produced by Rubén Blades and Willie Colón. Rubén Blades once cited this as his least favorite effort of his musical career. Blades remarked to Billboard in the July 10, 1982, issue that his musical partnership with Colón would end that year. This hiatus was later ended with their 1995 album "Tras La Tormenta."

== Reception ==
Generally considered the least successful of the Rubén Blades/Willie Colón collaborations, the album has been better received by newer generations.

Professional ratings
Review scores
Source	Rating
AllMusic	4/5 stars

== Track listing ==
All tracks are written by Rubén Blades, except where noted.

No.	Title	Writer(s)	Length
1.	"Yo Puedo Vivir del Amor"	José Feliciano	8:29
2.	"Andanza"	Danilo Caymmi; Edmundo Souto; Paulinho Tapajós	4:21
3.	"Cimarrón"	Rubén Blades	5:12
4.	"What Happened"	Rubén Blades	6:59
5.	"Venganza"	Pedro Flores	3:43
6.	"Y Tu Abuela"	Jaime Sabater	4:57

== Personnel ==
Producers:

- Ruben Blades
- Willie Colón

Executive Producer:

- Jerry Masucci

Engineers:

- Jon Fausty
- Willie Colón

Mixing:

- Jon Fausty
- Willie Colón

Arrangers:

- Luis Cruz
- Jay Chattaway
- Rubén Blades
- Willie Colón

Musicians:

- Rubén Blades - Vocals
- Willie Colón - Trombone, Vocals
- Eddie Resto - Bass (Electric), Guitar (Bass)
- Leopoldo Pineda - Trombone
- Luis Lopez - Trombone
- Jimmy Delgado - Timbales
- Johnny Andrews - Bongos, Cowbell
- Luis Antonio Lopez - Trombone
- Milton Cardona - Percussion, Conga, Choir, Chorus

Composers:

- Jaime Sabater
- Edmundo Souto
- Pedro Flores
- Paulinho Tapajós
- Danilo Caymmi

Liner Notes:

- Ernesto Lechner

Photographer, Artwork & Design:

- Ron Levine

Graphic Design:

- Louise Hilton

Editing:

- Richie Viera

Concept & Artistic Directors:

- Rubén Blades
- Willie Colón
