= Crossover Dreams =

1985 film by Leon Ichaso

- Directed by: Leon Ichaso
- Written by: Leon Ichaso; Manuel Arce
- Produced by: Carl Haber; Manuel Arce
- Starring: Rubén Blades; Shawn Elliott; Joel Diamond; Tom Signorelli; Elizabeth Peña; Frank Robles
- Cinematography: Claudio Chea
- Edited by: Gary Karr
- Music by: Mauricio Smith
- Production companies: CF Inc. Max Mambru Films
- Distributed by: Miramax Films
- Release dates: March 29, 1985 (New Directors/New Films Festival); August 23, 1985 (United States)
- Running time: 86 minutes
- Country: United States
- Language: English

Crossover Dreams is a 1985 American comedy-drama film directed by Leon Ichaso. The film follows salsa singer Rudy Veloz (played by musician Rubén Blades) on his rise to fame as he tries to break into the mainstream music scene. The film mostly takes place in Spanish Harlem, New York City. This was the first major feature film role for Rubén Blades.

The film was screened in April 1985 during the New Directors/New Films series co-sponsored by the Film Society of Lincoln Center and the Museum of Modern Art where it received positive reviews and sold out. It was released August 23, 1985 at the Cinema Studio in New York.

Roger Ebert praised Blades' performance: "The story isn't new, but it sure does wear well. Maybe that's because Blades is such an engaging performer, playing a character who is earnest and sincere when he needs to be, but who always maintains a veil over his deepest secrets."
