= El Cantante (song) =

1978 Salsa single by Hector Lavoe

Single by Héctor Lavoe

from the album Comedia and Doble Filo
- Language: Spanish
- English title: "The Singer"
- Released: 1978
- Genre: Salsa
- Length: 10:23
- Label: Fania
- Songwriter: Rubén Blades
- Producer: Willie Colón

"El Cantante" (The Singer) is the 1978 signature song of Puerto Rican salsa singer Héctor Lavoe and first single of the album Comedia. The song was written by Rubén Blades and produced by Willie Colón. The 2006 movie about Lavoe's life, El Cantante, takes its title from the song. In 2024, the song was selected for preservation in the National Recording Registry by the Library of Congress as being "culturally, historically, or aesthetically significant".

== Ángel López version ==
In late 2004, Puerto Rican singer Ángel López, released a cover of the song as a solo artist after being the lead singer of the group Son by Four. His version had airplay success on the US Tropical Airplay chart by Billboard.

=== Charts ===
Chart (2005)	Peak position
US Tropical Airplay (Billboard)	21
