= Amor y Control =

Studio album by Rubén Blades & Son del Solar
- Released: September 22, 1992
- Recorded: March – April 1992
- Studios: Power Station, Nueva York
- Genres: Salsa; tropical
- Length: 54:41
- Label: CBS
- Producers: Rubén Blades; Oscar Hernández

Rubén Blades chronology
| Caminando (1991) | Amor y Control (1992) | Tras La Tormenta (1995) |

Singles from Amor y Control
- 1. "Creo en Tí" Released: 1992; 2. "Piensa en Mí" Released: 1992; 3. "Baby's In Black" / "West Indian Man" Released: 1992; 4. "El Apagón" Released: February 12, 1993

Amor y Control (transl. "Love and Control") is the eleventh studio album by Panamanian singer Rubén Blades and the sixth album with his Band Son Del Solar released on September 22, 1992 through CBS Records International. Featuring a variety of Caribbean and Latin American musical genres, which reached #14 on the Billboard Tropical/Salsa charts and received a nomination for Grammy Award for best Tropical Latin Album.

The album had three outstanding songs that are "Amor Y Control", "Adán García" and "Creo en Ti" which had a video clip, there is also a reversion of the song Baby's in Black" by the English rock pop band The Beatles originally released on December 4, 1964 for their Beatles for Sale album. The five singles from the album were "Creo en Tí", "Piensa en Mí", "West Indan Man", "Baby's in Black" and "El Apagón".

== Track listing ==
All tracks are written by Rubén Blades, except where noted.

Amor y Control track listing
| No. | Title | Writer(s) | Length |
|---|---|---|---|
| 1. | "El Apagón" | Rubén Blades | 5:26 |
| 2. | "West Indian Man" | Blades | 3:28 |
| 3. | "Adán García" | Blades | 4:48 |
| 4. | "Naturaleza Muerta" | Blades | 2:30 |
| 5. | "El Cilindro" | Blades | 4:31 |
| 6. | "Piensa en Mí" | Blades | 4:31 |
| 7. | "Amor y Control" | Blades | 5:52 |
| 8. | "Canto a la Madre" | Blades | 2:50 |
| 9. | "Canto a la Muerte" | Blades | 6:23 |
| 10. | "Baby's in Black" | John Lennon; Paul McCartney | 3:33 |
| 11. | "Creo en Ti" | Blades | 4:38 |
| 12. | "Conmemorando" | Blades | 6:11 |
| Total length: | | | 54:41 |

== Personnel ==
- Composer - Rubén Blades
- Arranger, Synthesizer - Arturo Ortiz
- Mastering - Bob Ludwig
- Assistant Engineer - Chris Albert
- Congas - Eddie Montalvo
- Bongos - George Gonzalez
- Piano - Hernandez
- Composer - John Lennon
- Engineer, Mixing - Jon Fausty
- Assistant Engineer - Marc Glass
- Bass - Michael Vinas
- Mixing Assistant - Michael White
- Arranger, Piano - Oscar Hernandez
- Composer - Paul McCartney
- Guiro, Tambora, Tumbadora - Porfirio Fernández
- Timbales - Ralph Irizarry
- Trombone - Renaldo Jorge
- Cover Art Concept, Photography - Ricardo Betancourt
- Drums - Robby Ameen
- Arranger, Composer, Cover Art Concept, Acoustic Guitar, Primary Artist, Producer, Vocals, Background Vocals - Rubén Blades
- Primary Artist - Rubén Blades y Son del Solar
- Percussion - Sammy Figueroa
- Primary Artist - Seis Del Solar
- Performer, Primary Artist - Son del Solar
- Background Vocals - Tito Allen

== Certification ==
| Region | Certification | Certified units/sales |
|---|---|---|
| United States (RIAA) | Platinum (Latin) | 100,000^{^} |
^{^} Shipments figures based on certification alone.
