= Caminando (album) =

Studio album by Rubén Blades & Son del Solar
- Released: May 28, 1991
- Recorded: November 1990 – February 1991
- Genre: Salsa, Latín
- Length: 39:53
- Label: Sony Music Entertainment and Sony International
- Producer: Rubén Blades

Rubén Blades chronology
Live! (1990)	Caminando (1991)	Amor y Control (1992)

Caminando (Walking) is an album by Rubén Blades with Son Del Solar, his first album after moving from Elektra to Sony International, released on May 28, 1991. The album was a critical and commercial success with Latin and salsa audiences, marking a temporary return to Blades earlier coro-heavy style which marked the collaborations with Willie Colón of a decade earlier on Fania. The album also reinstated the political content of his music, though some listeners still found the social criticism lacking. Blades new band for Sony, Son del Solar, includes four of the Seis del Solar members from his Elektra albums: percussionists Ralph Irizarry, Eddie Montalvo and Robby Ameen with pianist Oscar Hernández. The album reached number three on the Billboard Tropical Albums chart and received a Grammy nomination for Best Tropical Latin Album in 1992.

== Track listing ==
The title track "Caminando", "Camaleón", and the trombone heavy "Prohibido olvidar," were released as singles. All songs are written by Blades. The song "Cipriano Armenteros" (composed by Blades but first released in the album "Este es Ismael Miranda" by singer Ismael Miranda back in 1975) was also popular and became known as one of the first successful examples of "narrative-salsa" genre.

All tracks are written by Rubén Blades, except where noted.

No.	Title	Writer(s)	Length
1.	"Caminando"	Rubén Blades	2:43
2.	"Camaleón"	Rubén Blades	4:12
3.	"Mientras Duerme la Ciudad"	Rubén Blades	3:00
4.	"Ella Se Esconde"	Rubén Blades	5:28
5.	"Tengan Fe"	Rubén Blades	3:58
6.	"Obalue"	Rubén Blades	4:46
7.	"Prohibido Olvidar"	Rubén Blades	4:51
8.	"Cipriano Armenteros"	Rubén Blades	4:43
9.	"Él"	Rubén Blades	2:35
10.	"Raíz de Sueños"	Rubén Blades	3:37

== Certification ==
Region	Certification	Certified units/sales
United States (RIAA)	Platinum (Latin)	100,000^{^}
^{^} Shipments figures based on certification alone.
