= Metiendo Mano =

1977 studio album by Willie Colón & Rubén Blades

Metiendo Mano!

Studio album by Willie Colón and Rubén Blades
- Released: October 7, 1977
- Recorded: 1976–1977
- Studio: La Tierra, New York City
- Genre: Salsa
- Length: 50:23
- Label: Fania
- Producer: Willie Colón; Jerry Masucci

Willie Colón and Rubén Blades chronology
The Good, The Bad, The Ugly (1975)	Metiendo Mano! (1977)	Siembra (1978)

Professional ratings
Review scores
Source	Rating
AllMusic	4.5/5 stars
The Encyclopedia of Popular Music	3/5 stars
MusicHound World	4/5 stars

Metiendo Mano! (transl. "Hard at work!") is the first collaborative studio album by Puerto Rican-American trombonist and singer Willie Colón and Panamanian singer-songwriter Rubén Blades, released on October 7, 1977, through Fania Records. The album was produced by Colón and Jerry Masucci and it's the first of five collaborative albums by Colón and Blades. The record includes the song "Pablo Pueblo", which is considered to be one of the initial forays into "conscious" or "intellectual" salsa and was the theme song to Blades' unsuccessful Panamanian presidential bid in 1994. Craig Harris wrote in MusicHound World that the album "not only represents a historic meeting of musical minds but remains a dance-inspiring masterpiece."

== Track listing ==
All tracks are written by Rubén Blades, except where noted.

No.	Title	Writer(s)	Length
1.	"Pablo Pueblo"		5:09
2.	"Según el Color"	Felix Hernández	6:00
3.	"La Maleta"		4:41
4.	"Me Recordarás"	Frank Domínguez	3:42
5.	"Plantación Adentro"	C. Curet Alonso	5:50
6.	"La Mora"	Eliseo Grenet	6:10
7.	"Lluvia de Tu Cielo"	Johnny Ortiz	5:41
8.	"Fue Varón"		5:32
9.	"Pueblo"		7:05

== Personnel ==
Producer:

- Willie Colón

Executive Producer:

- Jerry Masucci

Musicians:

- Willie Colón – Trombone Solo (“Lluvia De Tu Cielo”), Gong, Percussion
- Ruben Blades – Acoustic Guitar
- Leopoldo Pineda – Trombone Solo (“Fue Varón”)
- Papo Vasquez – Trombone
- Lewis Kahn – Trombone
- Salvador Cuevas – Bass
- Milton Cardona – Conga, Clave, Talking Drum, Quinto (“Pueblo”)
- José Mangual Jr. – Bongos, Maracas, Percussion
- Nicky Marrero – Timbales
- José Torres – Piano
- Sonny Bravo – Piano (“Pablo Pueblo”), (“Según El Color”)
- Tom Malone – Tuba, Harp Synthesizer
- Yomo Toro – Cuatro (“Según El Color”), Lead Acoustic Guitar (“Me Recordarás”)
- Ruben Blades – Lead Vocals
- Chorus – Willie Colón, Ruben Blades, Milton Cardona, José Mangual Jr

Arrangements:

- Willie Colón (“Según El Color”, “La Mora”, “Plantación Adentro”)
- Louie Cruz (“Pueblo”, “Lluvia De Tu Cielo”)
- Louis Ortíz – (“Pablo Pueblo”, “La Maleta”)
- Louie Ramírez (“ Fue Varón”)

Recorded at – La Tierra Sound Studios, NY

Engineers:

- Jon Fausty
- Irv Greenbaum

Photography – Mark Kozlowiski

Design – Izzy Sanabria

Title Design – Pam Lessero
