= Escenas =

Studio album by Rubén Blades
- Released: 1985
- Genre: Salsa
- Label: Elektra

Rubén Blades chronology
Buscando América (1984)	Escenas (1985)	Doble Filo (1986)

Escenas (Scenes) is the second studio album by Rubén Blades as a soloist and with his band Seis Del Solar, released in 1985 by Elektra Records. The album reached No. 3 on the Billboard Tropical Albums chart.

Highlighting songs like "La Cancion Del Final Del Mundo", "Caina", "Sorpresas".

== Critical reception ==
Professional ratings
Review scores
Source	Rating
AllMusic	3.5/5 stars
The Village Voice	A−

John Storm Roberts of AllMusic noted that "there's a lot going on here" on the album, which the editors of AllMusic gave a 3.5 out of five star rating.

Escenas also won a Grammy in the category of Best Tropical Latin Performance.

== Track listing ==
No.	Title	Writer(s)	Length
1.	"Cuentas Del Alma"	Rubén Blades	5:08
2.	"Tierra Dura (Etiopia)"	Rubén Blades	5:04
3.	"La Canción Del Final Del Mundo"	Rubén Blades	4:34
4.	"Sorpresas"	Rubén Blades	7:31
5.	"Caína"	Rubén Blades	4:54
6.	"Silencios"	Rubén Blades	5:28
7.	"Muévete"	Rubén Blades, Juan Formell	8:00
