= Mundo (Rubén Blades album) =

Studio album by Rubén Blades
- Released: 17 September 2002
- Recorded: February – November 2001
- Studio: Audio Arte; Estudio FM; Estudio Verde, San Jose, Costa Rica
- Genre: Latin; Latin pop; salsa
- Length: 68:31
- Language: Spanish; English
- Label: Sony International; Sony Tropical; Columbia
- Producer: Rubén Blades; Walter Flores; Edin Solís

Rubén Blades chronology
Tiempos (1999)	Mundo (2002)	Una Década (2003)

Singles from Mundo
- 1. "Estampa" Released: 17 November 2000

Mundo (transl. "World") is the eighth studio album by Panamian singer-songwriter Rubén Blades, released on 17 September 2002 through Sony International, Sony Tropical, and Columbia Records. It was produced by Blades, Walter Flores, and Edin Solís, and features folk standards such as "Danny Boy" and salsa standards like "Estampa", "Parao!", and "El Capitan y la Sirena". The album won a Grammy Award for Best World Music Album in 2003 and received a nomination for Album of the Year at the 4th Annual Latin Grammy Awards, the same year.

== Track listing ==
All songs by Rubén Blades, unless noted otherwise.

1. "Estampa (Profile)" – 7:22
2. "First Circle" (Mays, Metheny) – 4:50
3. "Primogenio (Beginnings)" (Blades, Flores) – 3:51
4. "Bochinches (Gossip)" (Blades, Flores) – 4:41
5. "Ella (She)" – 5:48
6. "Parao! (On My Feet)" – 5:58
7. "Como Nosotros (Like You and Me)" – 5:40
8. "El Capitain y la Sirena (The Captain and the Mermaid)" – 3:29
9. "Sebastian" – 5:06
10. "Consideracion (Consideration) (Oriente)" (Blades, Gil) – 3:51
11. "Jiri Son Bali" – 4:20
12. "Danny Boy" (Weatherly) – 6:54
13. "La Ruta (The Road) (Diha Cesto)" – 4:08
14. "A San Patricio (Extracto)" – 2:33
