= Siembra =

1978 studio album by Willie Colón & Rubén Blades

Studio album by Willie Colón and Rubén Blades
- Released: 21 December 1978
- Recorded: 1977–1978
- Studios: La Tierra; New York City
- Genre: Salsa
- Length: 43:45
- Languages: English; Spanish
- Label: Fania
- Producers: Willie Colón; Jerry Masucci; Johnny Pacheco

Willie Colón and Rubén Blades chronology
Metiendo Mano! (1977)	Siembra (1978)	Canciones del Solar de los Aburridos (1981)

Singles from Siembra
- 1. "Siembra" Released: 2 September 1978; 2. "Pedro Navaja" Released: 19 March 1979; 3. "Plástico" Released: 24 June 1979

Siembra (transl. "Sow") is the second collaborative studio album by Panamanian singer and songwriter Rubén Blades and Puerto Rican-American singer and Willie Colón as producer. It was released through Fania Records on December 21, 1978. It is the best selling salsa album in the history of salsa music. The album was recorded by Jerry Masucci and Johnny Pacheco at the La Tierra Sound Studios between 1977 and 1978.

== Background ==
Siembra is the second of five collaborative duo albums produced by Willie Colón. Siembra became the first salsa album to sell over one million units and according to some estimates, has sold over three million copies worldwide, making it the bestselling salsa album of all-time. Almost all of its songs were hits in various Latin American countries. With its rousing social commentary and unconventional sound, "Siembra" remains one of the most original and influential works in that genre. Blades' "Pedro Navaja," a song that he fashioned after Bertolt Brecht's "Threepenny Opera," is considered one of this greatest songs.

== Critical reception ==
Professional ratings
Review scores
Source	Rating
AllMusic	5/5 stars
The Encyclopedia of Popular Music	4/5 stars
MusicHound World	4/5 stars

John Bush of AllMusic praised the composition of the songs by Blades as well the arrangements by Colón. Bush emphasizes the use of disco arrangements at the beginning of the first track, "Plástico", until Colón's band "slip into a devastating salsa groove". He also praised Blade's vocals, noting his high-tenor voice on "Buscando Guayaba" and tender tones on "Dime". The album was inducted into the Latin Grammy Hall of Fame in 2007. It was listed in the book 1001 Albums You Must Hear Before You Die. In 2024, it was ranked in first position on the “Los 600 de Latinoamérica” list compiled by a collective of music journalists, highlighting the top 600 Latin American albums from 1920 to 2022. The album was ranked number one of the 50 greatest salsa albums of all time by Rolling Stone Magazine in October 2024.

== In pop culture ==
The song "Buscando Guayaba" was featured in the 1988 Disney animated film Oliver & Company.

== Track listing ==
All tracks are written by Rubén Blades, except where noted.

Siembra track listing
No.	Title	Writer(s)	Length
1.	"Plástico"	Rubén Blades	6:37
2.	"Buscando Guayaba"	Rubén Blades	5:43
3.	"Pedro Navaja"	Rubén Blades	7:21
4.	"María Lionza"	Rubén Blades	5:27
5.	"Ojos"	Johnny Ortiz	4:50
6.	"Dime"	Rubén Blades	6:59
7.	"Siembra"	Rubén Blades	5:21
Total length:			43:45

== Personnel ==
- Willie Colón: Album Producer, music director, Chorus Ensemble, Trombone
- Rubén Blades: Composer, Songwriter, Lead Vocals, Chorus Ensemble
- Jon Fausty: Audio Engineer, Recording Schemes, Mixing
- Kevin Zambrana: Asst. Audio Engineer
- Leopoldo Pineda: Trombone
- Jose Rodriguez: Trombone
- Angel (Papo) Vazquez: Trombone
- Sam Burtis: Trombone
- José Torres: Piano, Fender Rhodes, Electric Piano
- José Mangual Jr: Bongos, Maracas, Chorus Ensemble
- Jimmy Delgado: Timbal
- Adalberto Santiago: Percussion, Chorus Ensemble
- Eddie Montalvo: Tumbadora, Percussion
- Johnny Ortiz: songwriter (Ojos)
- Bryan Brake: Drums (Plástico)
- Salvador Cuevas: Bass
- Eddie Rivera: Bass
- Jerry Masucci: Executive Producer

== Sales ==
Region	Certification	Certified units/sales
Venezuela	—	500,000
