= Canciones del Solar de los Aburridos =

1981 studio album by Willie Colón & Rubén Blades

Studio album by Willie Colón and Rubén Blades
- Released: September 20, 1981
- Recorded: June – July 1981
- Studios: La Tierra; Sound Works, New York City
- Genre: Salsa
- Length: 42:17
- Language: Spanish
- Label: Fania
- Producers: Willie Colón; Rubén Blades; Larry Harlow; Jerry Masucci

Willie Colón and Rubén Blades chronology
Maestra Vida (1980)	Canciones del Solar de los Aburridos (1981)	The Last Fight (1982)

Canciones del Solar de los Aburridos (transl. "Songs from the Tenement of the Bored") is the third collaborative studio album by Puerto Rican-American trombonist and singer Willie Colón and Panamanian singer-songwriter Rubén Blades, released on September 20, 1981, by Fania Records. It is the second most successful album of the duo, being a post-boogalo album with the sounds of hard salsa, a characteristic of the Harlow Orchestra.

== Background ==
Canciones del Solar de los Aburridos is the third of five collaborative albums produced by Rubén Blades and Willie Colón for Fania. The songs were mainly composed by Blades ranging in theme from politics to comedy.

== Reception ==
Professional ratings
Review scores
Source	Rating
AllMusic	3/5 stars
The Encyclopedia of Popular Music	4/5 stars
MusicHound World	4/5 stars

Although Grammy-nominated, Canciones del Solar de los Aburridos received little air play in the United States at the time of its release due to the political slant of the song "Tiburón" (literally, "Shark") referring to U.S. hegemony in Latin America. The main opposition to the composition came from the Cuban communities in the U.S. In 1991 Willie Colón reflected, "that type of composition caused us a lot of trouble, so much so that at one point when we were doing "Pedro Navaja" and "Tiburón" with Blades, we had to perform in bulletproof vests." However, reception was much warmer in Puerto Rico and other Latin American countries, where "Tiburón", "Te Están Buscando" and "Ligia Elena" were major radio hits.

== Track listing ==
All tracks are written by Rubén Blades, except where noted.

No.	Title	Writer(s)	Length
1.	"Tiburón"	Rubén Blades	6:57
2.	"Te Están Buscando"	Rubén Blades	6:25
3.	"Madame Kalalú"	Rubén Blades	6:53
4.	"El Telefonito"	Silvestre Méndez	5:11
5.	"Y Deja"	Piloto y Vera	4:20
6.	"Ligia Elena"	Rubén Blades	6:01
7.	"¿De Qué?"	Rubén Blades	6:15

== Personnel ==
Concept and Artistic Direction:

- Rubén Blades & Willie Colon

Arrangements:

- Hector Garrido
- Javier Vazquez
- Luis Cruz
- Marty Sheller
- Rubén Blades
- Willie Colon

Participating Musicians:

- Johnny Andrews
- Ruben Blades
- Sam Burtis
- Milton Cardona
- Willie Colon
- Salvador Cuevas
- Jimmy Delgado
- Andy González
- Reynaldo Jorge
- Lewis Kahn
- Jose Rodríguez
- Joe Santiago
- Joe Torres

Engineers:

- Willie Colon
- Jon Fausty

Assistants:

- Kevin Zambrana
- Henry Monzon

Original Cover Design:

- Izzy Sanabria

Designer:

- Jorge Vargas

Photographer:

- Lee Marshall

Hair Stylist for Willie Colon:

- James Perez

Produced By:

- Willie Colon & Ruben Blades for WAC Productions, Inc.

== Sales ==
Region	Certification	Certified units/sales
Venezuela	—	180,000
