= Pedro Navaja =

Salsa song by Willie Colón & Rubén Blades

Single by Willie Colón and Rubén Blades

from the album Siembra
- Language: Spanish
- Released: March 1979
- Recorded: May – June 1978
- Studio: La Tierra Sound Studios (New York)
- Genre: Salsa
- Length: 7:22
- Label: Fania
- Songwriter: Rubén Blades
- Producers: Willie Colón; Jerry Masucci

Willie Colón and Rubén Blades singles chronology
"Buscando Guayaba" (1978)	"Pedro Navaja" (1979)	"Plástico" (1979)

"Pedro Navaja" (English: Peter Blade) is a salsa song written and performed by Rubén Blades from the 1978 collaboration with Willie Colón, Siembra, about a criminal of the same name. Navaja means "folding knife" in Spanish. Inspired by the song "Mack the Knife", it tells the story of a panderer's life and presumed death. The song is recognized throughout Hispanic America, as it retells scenes and stories common to these countries, although the story takes place in New York City. The song deals with life, death and the unexpected with dark humor.

A film titled Pedro Navaja based on the song was filmed in Mexico in 1984, starring Andrés García as the title character, Maribel Guardia as his girlfriend, and Resortes as his best friend. It was made without Blades's input and he responded by recording the song "Sorpresas" (Surprises), which continues the story, turning the movie plot by revealing that Navaja was alive and had killed another panderer while he was being searched by the panderer, provided that the other panderer believed Navaja was dead. The 1984 film had a 1986 sequel, El Hijo de Pedro Navaja (The Son of Pedro Navaja) starring Guillermo Capetillo. The story is believed to take place in the New York borough of Queens.

The musical La verdadera historia de Pedro Navaja is based on John Gay's "The Beggar's Opera" and Bertolt Brecht's "The Threepenny Opera." The book and lyrics are by Pablo Cabrera, and music is by Pedro Rivera Toledo. It was first produced by Teatro del Sesenta in San Juan, Puerto Rico, in 1980 at the Teatro Sylvia Rexach; toured to Santo Domingo, Dominican Republic; and, opened the Joseph Papp's Latino Festivals of 1985 and 1986, where José Félix Gómez and Idalia Pérez Garay played the title role with Darysabel Isales playing "Doña Pura Buenaventura"; it was also produced by the Teatro Musical de La Habana, Cuba; produced by the Compañía de Teatro Nacional de Venezuela (1986 & 1991); Lolyn Paz produced it three times: in Caguas, Puerto Rico (2003), with Yolandita Monge in the lead female part, San Juan, Puerto Rico (2004), and Fort Lauderdale, Florida (2004); Lima, Peru, starring, among others, Camila Mac Lennan. In 2019 it was staged in Miami with Beatriz Valdés and Manolo Ramos in the lead parts.

== Storyline ==
The lyrics of the song by Blades describe the namesake of the song as he walks down an unnamed avenue in New York City, explicitly mentioning how Navaja dresses, what kind of shoes and hat he wears, his dark glasses (worn so that no one can tell what he is looking at), his shiny gold tooth, and how he always hides his hands in his coat pockets so that "no one can tell in which hands he holds his knife." At the same time, the song notes and also describes a tired streetwalker who is walking the same street about three blocks from Navaja. An unmarked police car slowly cruises down the avenue, and the prostitute steps into an alley to have a drink - it is a slow day and she has not had any clients.

Navaja looks around the empty avenue, when suddenly the woman comes out of the alley and he sees her. He tightens his grip on the knife and silently runs across the street. Meanwhile, the prostitute takes a gun out of her coat pocket and is about to put it in her purse, so that it stops "bothering" her, when Navaja attacks her with the knife, laughing and the gold tooth "lighting up the avenue" as he plunges the weapon into her. Suddenly a shot rings out from a Smith & Wesson .38 Special (Smith y Wesson del especial") and Navaja falls to the ground while the mortally wounded woman taunts him verbally as she also falls to the ground.

A drunken man stumbles upon the two dead bodies, picks up the gun, the knife, and the money (“los pesos”) and saunters away singing off-key about the "surprises that life throws at you."

== Reception ==
On the review of the album Siembra, John Bush of Allmusic referred the message as "a devastating life-in-el-Barrio exposé". He also praised the arrangements of Willie Colón and Luis Ortiz, noting the use of street noise and police sirens as well as the statement "I like to live in America", part of the chorus lyrics for the song "America" from West Side Story, the film. It was listed on Billboard's "15 Best Salsa Songs Ever" in 2018.

== Covers ==
The song has been covered by Los Joao, La Lupe, La Orquesta Plateria (that popularized the song in Spain), Pepe Arevalo, Los Flamers, Roman Palomar, A Palo Seko, Markoz, and La Pozze Latina. Pedro Navaja was one of the songs that Puerto Rican singer Chayanne covered on his 1994 album, Influencias. Mexican pop singer, Emmanuel covered the song on his live album, Emmanuel Presenta...

== Popular culture ==
The song is featured in The Flash (2023) as Nora Allen (Maribel Verdú) sings it to her son, Barry Allen (Ezra Miller), before her death.

== Musicians ==
Musicians as listed in the album's liner notes are:

- Trombone: Jose Rodriguez
- Trombone Angel Papo Vazquez
- Trombone Sam Burtis
- Solo Trombone: Willie Colon
- Piano: Jose Torres "Professor"
- Bass: Salvador Cuevas
- Bass: Eddie Rivera
- Bongo & Maracas: Jose Mangual, Jr.
- Tumbadora: Eddie Montalvo
- Timbales: Jimmy Delgado
- Bateria en Platico: Bryan Brake
- Maracas: A. Santiago
- Chorus: Wilie Colon, Ruben Blades, Jose Mangual, Jr., Adalberto Santiago

== Sales ==
Sales for Pedro Navaja
Region	Sales
Spain	268,000
