= Rubén Blades =

Panamanian musician (born 1948)

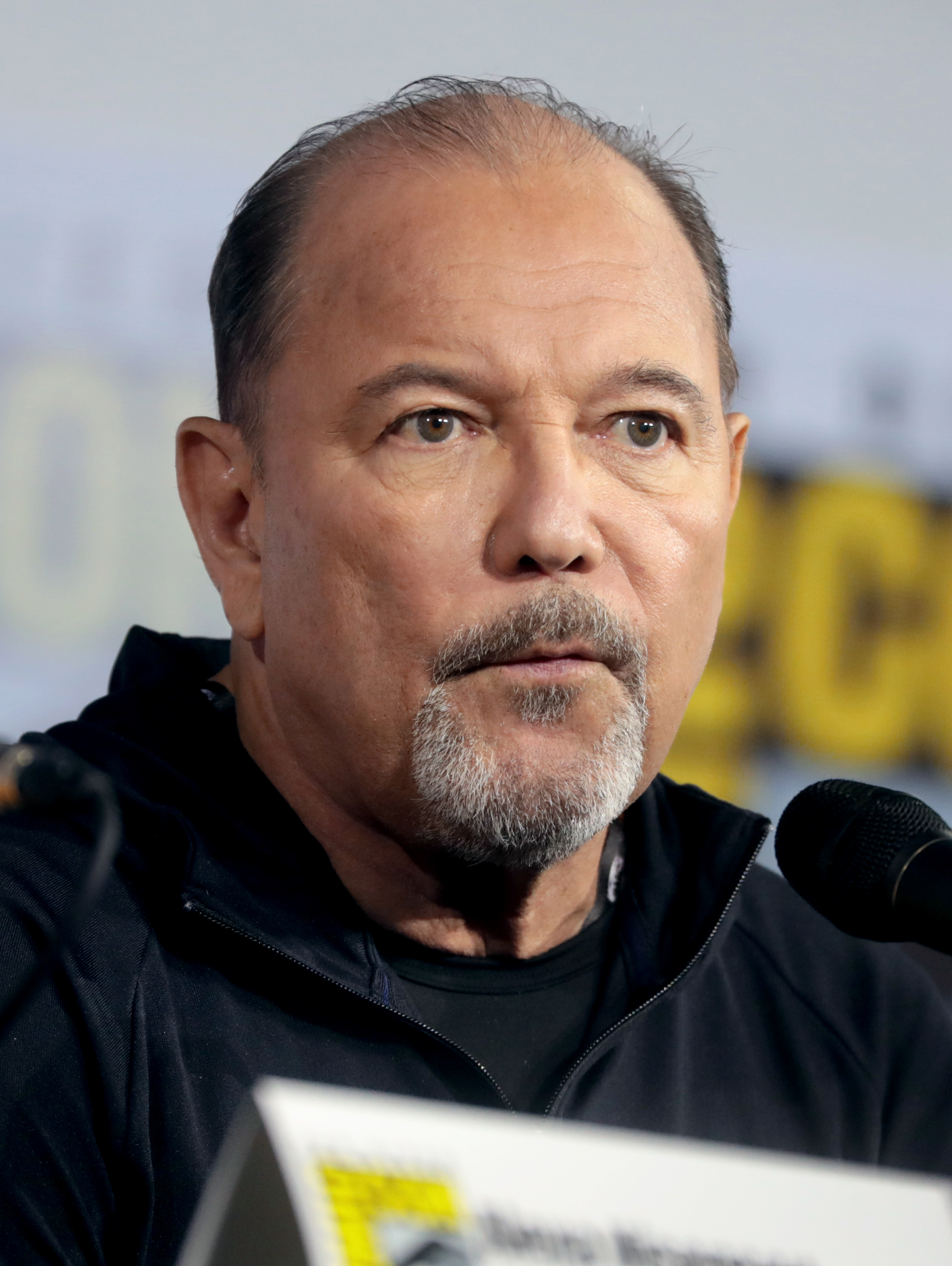
- Blades in 2019
- Born: Rubén Blades Bellido de Luna; 16 July 1948 (age 78); Panama City, Panama
- Education: University of Panama; Harvard University (LLM)
- Occupations: Musician; singer; composer; actor; activist; politician
- Years active: 1974–present
- Spouse: Luba Mason (m. 2006)
- Musical career
- Origin: New York City, U.S.
- Genres: Salsa; Latin jazz; Latin pop; world; Latin rock; Pop rock
- Instruments: Vocals; maracas; guitar
- Labels: Fania; Elektra; Sony; Columbia

Minister of Tourism of Panama
- In office 1 September 2004 – 30 June 2009
- President: Martín Torrijos
- Website: www.rubenblades.com (in Spanish)

Rubén Blades Bellido de Luna (born 16 July 1948), known professionally as Rubén Blades (Latin American Spanish: [ruˈβem ˈblaðes], but [- ˈblei̯ðs] in Panama and within the family), is a Panamanian musician, singer, composer, actor, activist, and politician, performing musically most often in the salsa, and Latin jazz genres. As a songwriter, Blades brought the lyrical sophistication of Central American nueva canción and Cuban nueva trova as well as experimental tempos and politically inspired Son Cubano salsa to his music, creating "thinking persons' (salsa) dance music". Blades has written dozens of hit songs, including "Pedro Navaja" and "El Cantante" (which became Héctor Lavoe's signature song). He has received 21 Grammy Award nominations, winning twelve of them, along with twelve Latin Grammy Awards.

His acting career began in 1983, and has continued, sometimes with several-year breaks to focus on other projects. He has prominent roles in films such as Crossover Dreams (1985), The Milagro Beanfield War (1988), The Super (1991), Predator 2 (1990), Color of Night (1994), Safe House (2012), The Counselor (2013) and Hands of Stone (2016), along with three Emmy Award nominations for his performances in The Josephine Baker Story (1991), Crazy from the Heart (1992), and The Maldonado Miracle (2003). He portrayed Daniel Salazar, a main character on the TV series Fear the Walking Dead (2015–2017; 2019–2023).

In 1994, Blades managed to attract 17% of the vote in a failed attempt to win the Panamanian presidency. In September 2004, he was appointed minister of tourism by Panamanian president Martín Torrijos for a five-year term.

He made his U.S. debut with the Pete Rodriguez orchestra in 1970 on his album De Panamá a New York and among his most successful albums are Rubén Blades y Son del Solar... Live!, Amor y Control, Caminando, Salswing!, Son de Panamá, Tangos, Canciones del Solar de los Aburridos, Buscando América, El Que la Hace la Paga, Escenas, Salsa Big Band, Metiendo Mano! and his famous album Siembra released in 1978. In addition, he has collaborated with different artists such as Usher, Elvis Costello, as a soloist and as a guest Michael Jackson, Luis Miguel, Julio Iglesias, Ricky Martin, Juan Gabriel, Laura Pausini, Shakira, Thalía in the Spanish version of the song "What More Can I Give" written and translated by Blades as "Todo Para Ti". He has also participated in several productions by different Latino artists such as "Almost Like Praying", "Color Esperanza 2020", and "Hoy Es Domingo", among other tracks.

== Family history and early life ==
Blades was born in Panama City, Panama. He is the son of Cuban musician and actress Anoland Díaz (her real surname is Bellido de Luna), and Colombian Rubén Darío Blades Sr., an athlete, a percussionist and a graduate of the Federal Bureau of Narcotics in Washington, D.C. His younger brother, Roberto Blades, is also a musician. His mother's great-uncle, Juan Bellido de Luna, was active in the Cuban revolutionary movement against Spain and was a writer and publisher in New York City. Blades's paternal grandfather, was thought to be Rubén Blades, an English-speaking native of St. Lucia who came to Panama as an accountant. However, in 2025 it was revealed on Finding Your Roots that Blades is actually the grandson of poet Ricardo Miró. Blades says that the man he thought was his grandfather had come to Panama to work on the Panama Canal, as he states in the song "West Indian Man" on the album Amor y Control ("That's where the Blades comes from") (1992). He explains the source and the pronunciation (/ˈbleɪdz/) of his family surname, which is of English origin, in his web show Show De Ruben Blades (SDRB). Additionally, on Finding Your Roots it was revealed that Amelia Denis de Icaza, the first Panamanian woman to publish her poems, was the aunt of Ricardo Miró, making her Blades's great-great-aunt.

In Blades's early days, he was a vocalist in Los Salvajes del Ritmo, and also a songwriter and guest singer with a popular Latin music conjunto (ensemble), Bush y sus Magníficos. His strongest influence of the day was the Joe Cuba sextet and Cheo Feliciano, whose singing style he copied to the point of imitating his voice tone and vocal range.

== Career ==
=== 1970s–1980s ===
Blades earned multiple degrees in political science and law at the Universidad Nacional de Panamá and performed legal work at the Bank of Panama as a law student.

Blades' first recording in the US was the solo album De Panamá a New York, with the Pete Rodriguez Orchestra, which included original compositions such as "Juan Gonzalez", "Descarga Caliente" and "De Panamá a New York", recorded in 1969 at The Sound Factory studio in California and released by New York City-based label Alegre Records in 1970. He then returned to Panamá and finished his degree.

In 1974, he moved to the United States, initially staying with his exiled parents in Miami, Florida, before moving to New York City where he began working in the mailroom at Fania Records. Soon Blades was working with salseros Ray Barretto and Larry Harlow. Shortly thereafter, Blades started collaborating with trombonist and bandleader Willie Colón. They recorded several albums together and participated in albums by plena singer Mon Rivera and the Fania All Stars.

Blades's first notable hit was a song on the 1977 album Metiendo Mano that he had composed in 1968, "Pablo Pueblo", a meditation about a working-class father who returns to his home after a long day at work. The song later became his unofficial campaign song when he ran for president of Panama. The Colón and Blades recording on the same album of Tite Curet Alonso's composition, "Plantación Adentro", which dealt with the brutal treatment of Indian natives in Latin America's colonial times, was a hit in various Caribbean countries. He wrote and performed several songs with the Fania All Stars and as a guest on other artists' releases, including the hits "Paula C", written about a girlfriend at the time; "Juan Pachanga", about a party animal who buries his pain over a romantic betrayal in dance and drink; and "Sin Tu Cariño", a love song, featuring a bomba break. The latter two songs feature piano solos by the Puerto Rican pianist Papo Lucca.

In 1978, Blades wrote the song "El Cantante"; Colón convinced him to give the song to Colón's former musical partner, Héctor Lavoe, to record, since Lavoe's nickname was already "El Cantante de los Cantantes" ("the singer of singers"). Lavoe recorded it that same year, and it became both a big hit and Lavoe's signature song; a biographical film about Lavoe took the same title. (The film El Cantante, starring executive producer Marc Anthony and then wife Jennifer López, told a fictionalized version of this story, in which Blades tells Lavoe he wrote the song for him.)

The Colón and Blades album Siembra (1978) became the best-selling salsa record in history, with Blades writing all but one of the songs. It has sold over 3 million copies, and almost all of its songs were hits at one time or another in various Latin American countries. Its most famous song was "Pedro Navaja", a song inspired by the 1928 song "Mack the Knife"; it tells the story of a neighborhood thug who is killed by a street walker who knows him (he stabs her, she shoots him, they both die, a bum finds them, and takes their belongings). The song inspired a 1980 Puerto Rican musical, La verdadera historia de Pedro Navaja, and a 1984 Mexican film, Pedro Navaja, neither of which had Blades' involvement. Blades wrote and sang a sequel song, "Sorpresas", (surprises) on his 1985 album, Escenas, which revealed that Pedro had survived the incident and was still alive.

Blades became dissatisfied with Fania and tried to terminate his contract, but was legally obliged to record several more albums, released after his departure.

His 1981 song "Tiburón" (with Willie Colon) protested against military interventions by the United States (the metaphorical "shark" in the song's title) in Latin America. It received little airplay in the US because of its controversial political message, with Blades being accused of sympathizing with communism and becoming particularly unpopular with the Cuban community in Miami. Blades would later state that "I was out of the radio for fifteen years in [the US] because of 'Tiburon'." Although he explicitly characterized "Tiburón" as "an anti-imperialist song", he also sought to distance himself from radical Anti-Americanism among the Latin American Left. A 2016 study concluded that "Regardless of his constant efforts not to be cornered ideologically [...] Blades always identified himself as a Panamanian and a Latin Americanist", inspired by Simón Bolívar.

In 1982 Blades got his first acting role, in The Last Fight, portraying a singer-turned-boxer vying for a championship against a fighter who was played by real-life world-champion boxer Salvador Sánchez. In 1984, he released Buscando América, and in 1985, Blades gained widespread recognition as co-writer and star of the independent film Crossover Dreams as a New York salsa singer willing to do anything to break into the mainstream. Blades also began his career in films scoring music for soundtracks. Also in 1985, he earned a master's degree in international law from Harvard Law School. He was the subject of Robert Mugge's documentary The Return of Rubén Blades, which debuted at that year's Denver Film Festival. He also recorded a segment for the 60 Minutes television program, interviewed by Morley Safer.

In 1984, Blades left Fania, and signed with Elektra, although Fania continued to release recordings compiled from their archives for some years afterwards. Blades assembled a band (known variously as Seis del Solar or Son del Solar) and began touring and recording with them. His first album with them, Escenas, included a duet with Linda Ronstadt (1985), won Blades his first Grammy Award, for Best Tropical Latin Album. He then recorded the album Agua de Luna, based on the short stories of writer Gabriel García Márquez, in 1987. The next year he released the English-language collaboration Nothing but the Truth, with rock artists Sting, Elvis Costello, and Lou Reed whose song "The Hit" aka its main chorus "Don't Double Cross the Ones You Love", appeared in the opening and closing credits of Sidney Lumet's 1990 crime drama film Q & A; also in 1988 he released the more traditionally salsa Antecedente, again with Seis del Solar, which again won a Grammy Award.

=== 1990s–2000s ===
During the 1990s, he acted in films and continued to make records with Seis/Son del Solar. In 1990, he released the collection Poetry: the Greatest Hits that according to Q Magazine "highlighted his political commentary and pastiche approach to music".

In 1994, he mounted an unsuccessful Panamanian presidential bid, founding a center-left party called Movimiento Papa Egoró (whose name comes from the Emberá language and means "Mother Earth"). The album that followed this experience was titled La Rosa de los Vientos. He also made award-winning music such as Pena and Amor y Control, won the 1997 Grammy for Best Tropical Latin Performance, and all its songs were by Panamanian songwriters, recorded using all Panamanian musicians. In 1996, Blades along with Son Miserables performed "No Te Miento (I Am Not Lying [to you])" for the AIDS benefit album Silencio=Muerte: Red Hot + Latin produced by the Red Hot Organization. In 1997, Blades headed the cast of singer/songwriter Paul Simon's first Broadway musical, The Capeman, based on a true story about a violent youth who becomes a poet in prison, which also starred Marc Anthony and Ednita Nazario. His many film appearances include The Milagro Beanfield War (1988), The Two Jakes (1990), Predator 2 (1990), Mo' Better Blues (1990), Color of Night (1994), and Devil's Own (1997). He also guest-starred in an episode of The X Files titled, "El Mundo Gira," playing immigration agent Conrad Lozano. In 1999, he played Mexican artist Diego Rivera in Tim Robbins' Cradle Will Rock. In the 2003 film Once Upon a Time in Mexico, starring Johnny Depp, Antonio Banderas, and Willem Dafoe, he played the role of a retired FBI agent.

Blades's 1999 album Tiempos, which he recorded with musicians from the Costa Rican groups Editus and Sexteto de Jazz Latino, represented a break from his salsa past and a further rejection of commercial trends in Latin music. Ironically, the album won a Grammy Award for Best Latin Pop Album. Blades was inducted into the International Latin Music Hall of Fame in 2001. Even more eclectic was the 2002 album Mundo with the 11-member Editus Ensemble and bagpiper Eric Rigler, which incorporated instruments from around the world. Mundo won the Grammy Award for Best World Music Album, and was also nominated for a Latin Grammy Award for Album of the Year. The same year, Blades guested on world music artist Derek Trucks' album, Joyful Noise. In 2003 he followed Mundo with a web site free-download project. Blades was presented with the Founders Award at the 2005 ASCAP Latin Awards. In 2004, he put his artistic career on hold when he began serving a five-year appointment as Panama's minister of tourism. Beginning in June 2007, however, Blades turned some of his attention back to his artistic career, presenting an online TV show titled Show de Ruben Blades (SDRB) on his website.

In November 2005 he received an honorary degree from the Berklee College of Music.

In May 2007, Blades was sued by his former bandmate Willie Colón for breach of contract. This led to a series of suits and countersuits that lasted over five years, resulting in decisions in Blades' favor. In the middle of 2008 he took a leave of absence for a mini-tour in Europe, backed by the Costa Rican band Son de Tikizia. When his government service was completed in June 2009, he reunited the members of Seis del Solar for the 25th anniversary of Buscando América in a tour of the Americas.

=== 2010–present ===
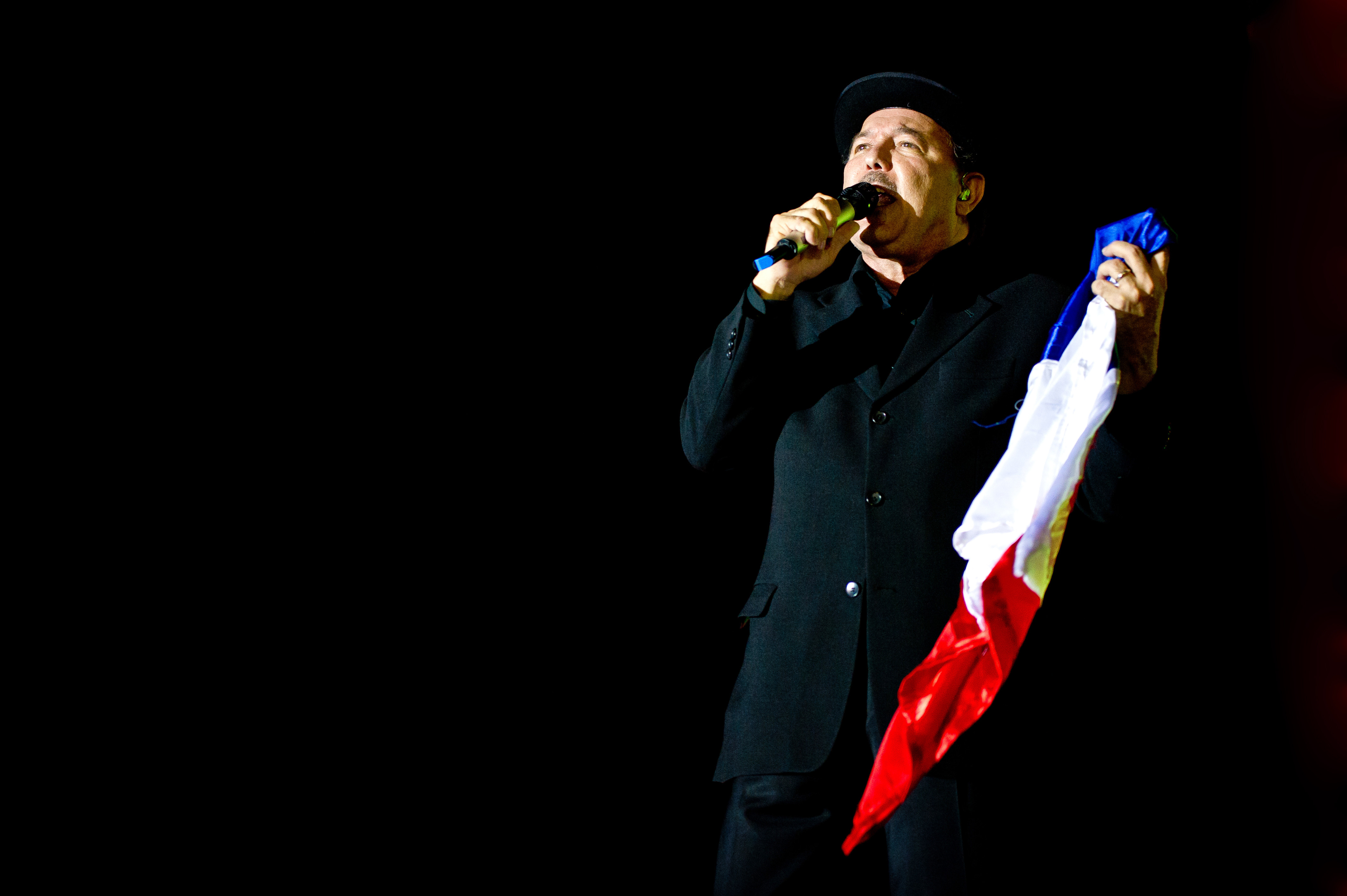
Blades performing

In June 2011, Blades was given the Harry Chapin Humanitarian Award by ASCAP and WhyHunger.

In 2014, Blades was the closing act for the Festival Internacional Cervantino in Mexico.

In 2015, Blades' album Tangos won a Grammy award for Best Latin Pop Album.

Blades expressed his interest in making another run for president of Panama in 2019.

In 2015, Blades was cast in the regular role of Daniel Salazar in the AMC post-apocalyptic drama Fear the Walking Dead, a companion series to The Walking Dead. Blades first appears in the second episode "So Close, Yet So Far".

In 2017, Blades performed as one of the featured artists for Puerto Rico in Lin-Manuel Miranda's charity single "Almost Like Praying" to raise money for victims of Hurricane Maria.

In September 2018, Blades was appointed as NYU Steinhardt Dean's Inaugural Scholar-in-Residence at New York University.

In 2021, Blades was honored as the Latin Recording Academy Person of the Year for his contributions to Latin music and activism.

In 2024, Blades received the Doctor of Music honorary degree at Princeton University in New Jersey, USA.

Lincoln Center in NYC named Blades its Visionary Artist for the 2024-2025 season.

In 2025, it was discovered on Finding Your Roots that Blades is the newly discovered grandson of poet Ricardo Miró.

== Personal life ==
Blades holds a Law degree from the University of Panama and an LL.M in International Law from Harvard University.

He married singer Luba Mason in 2006.

== Filmography ==
=== Film ===
Year	Title	Role	Notes
1983	The Last Fight	Andy 'Kid Clave'	
1985	Crossover Dreams	Rudy Veloz	Nominated—Independent Spirit Award for Best Male Lead
1987	Critical Condition	Louis	
1987	Sting: They Dance Alone (Cueca Solo)	Unknown	Video short
1987	Fatal Beauty	Detective Carl Jimenez	
1988	The Milagro Beanfield War	Sheriff Bernabe Montoya	
1988	Homeboy	Doctor	
1989	Disorganized Crime	Carlos Barrios	
1989	The Lemon Sisters	C.W.	
1990	Mo' Better Blues	Petey	
1990	The Two Jakes	Michael 'Mickey Nice' Weisskopf	
1990	Predator 2	Danny 'Danny Boy' Archuleta	
1990	Heart of the Deal	Unknown	
1991	The Super	Marlon	
1991	Ruben Blades: Camaleon	Unknown	Video short
1993	Life with Mikey	Angie's Dad	Uncredited
1994	A Million to Juan	Bartender	
1994	Color of Night	Lieutenant Hector Martinez	
1995	Scorpion Spring	Border Patrolman Sam Zaragosa	
1996	Grampa	Doctor	
1996	Eres mi Canción	Singer	Video short
1996	Al compas de un sentimiento	Singer	
1997	The Devil's Own	Officer Edwin 'Eddie' Diaz	
1997	Chinese Box	Jim	
1999	Cradle Will Rock	Diego Rivera	
2000	All the Pretty Horses	Hector De La Rocha	
2002	Assassination Tango	Miguel	
2003	Once Upon a Time in Mexico	FBI Agent Jorge Ramirez	
2003	Imagining Argentina	Silvio Ayala	
2003	Spin	Ernesto Bejarano	
2005	Secuestro express	Carla's Father	
2009	Spoken Word	Cruz Sr.	
2011	La siguiente estación	Benito	Short film
2012	Safe House	Carlos Villar	
2012	For Greater Glory – The True Story of Cristiada	President Calles	
2013	The Counselor	'Jefe'	
2016	Hands of Stone	Carlos Eleta	
TBA	Porto Rico †		Filming

=== Television ===
Year	Title	Role	Notes
1989	Dead Man Out	Ben	Television Film
1989	Cinemax Sessions	Unknown	Episode: "Latino Sessions"
1991	The Josephine Baker Story	Count Giuseppe Pepito Abatino	Television Film; Nominated—Primetime Emmy Award for Outstanding Supporting Actor in a Miniseries or a Special
1991	One Man's War	Horacio Galeano Perrone	Television Film
1991	Crazy from the Heart	Ernesto Ontiveros	Television Film; Nominated—Primetime Emmy Award for Outstanding Lead Actor in a Miniseries or a Special
1993	Miracle on Interstate 880	Pastor Beruman	Television Film
1997	The X-Files	Conrad Lozano	Episode: "El Mundo Gira"
1997	Falls Road	Luis Juega	Television Film
2000–2001	Gideon's Crossing	Dr. Max Cabranes	Main role; 20 episodes
2002	Resurrection Blvd.	Martin	Episode: "Verguenza"
2003	The Maldonado Miracle	Cruz	Television Film; Nominated—Daytime Emmy Award for Outstanding Performer in a Children/Youth/Family Special
2015–2017; 2019–2023	Fear the Walking Dead	Daniel Salazar	Main role (seasons 1–3, 5–8); 52 episodes

== Discography ==
=== Studio albums ===
- De Panamá a New York (1970)
- Barretto (1975)
- The Good, the Bad, the Ugly (with Willie Colón) (1975)
- Metiendo Mano! (1977)
- Larry Harlow, La Raza Latina-A Salsa Suite. (1977)
- Siembra (1978)
- Bohemio y Poeta (1979)
- Maestra Vida: Primera Parte (1980)
- Maestra Vida: Segunda Parte (1980)
- Canciones Del Solar De Los Aburridos (1981)
- The Last Fight (1982)
- El Que la Hace la Paga (1982)
- Mucho Mejor (1984)
- Buscando América (1984)
- Escenas (1985)
- Crossover Dreams (1986)
- Agua de Luna (1987)
- Doble Filo (1987)
- With Strings (1988)
- Nothing but the Truth (1988)
- Antecedente (1988)
- Caminando (1991)
- Amor y Control (1992)
- Joseph & His Brothers (1993)
- Tras La Tormenta (with Willie Colón) (1995)
- La Rosa de los Vientos (1996)
- Tiempos (1999)
- Mundo (2002)
- Cantares del Subdesarrollo (2009)
- Eba Say Ajá (with Cheo Feliciano) (2012)
- Tangos (2014)
- Son de Panamá (2015)
- Almost Like Praying (2017)
- Salsa Big Band (2017)
- Medoro Madera (2018)
- Paraíso Road Gang (2019)
- Salswing! (2021)
- Salsa Plus! (2021)
- Swing! (2021)
- Pasieros (2022)
- Parceiros (2022)
- Fotografías (2025)
- País Portátil (2026)

=== Live albums ===
- Siembra Live (1980)
- Doble Filo (1986)
- Rubén Blades y Son del Solar... Live! (1990)
- Todos Vuelven: Live, Vol. 1 (2011)
- Todos Vuelven: Live, Vol. 2 (2011)
- Una Noche con Rubén Blades (2018)
- Siembra: 45º Aniversario En Vivo (2023)

=== Compilation albums ===
- Poeta Latino (1993)
- Poetry: The Greatest Hits (1994)
- La Leyenda (1994)
- The Best (1996)
- Greatest Hits (Música Latina) (1996)
- Sus Más Grandes Éxitos (1998)
- Best of Rubén Blades (1998)
- Salsa Caliente de New York (2002)
- Una Década (2003)
- La Experiencia (2004)
- A Man And His Music: Poeta del Pueblo (2008)
- Greatest Hits (2008)
- Dos Clásicos (2011)
- 10 de Colección (2014)
- Serie Platino (2014)
- Salsero Original (2016)

== Awards and nominations ==
=== Grammy Awards ===
Year	Category	Nominated work	Result	Ref.
1983	Best Latin Recording	Canciones del Solar de los Aburridos (with Willie Colón)	Nominated	
1984	Best Tropical Latin Performance	El Que Hace la Paga	Nominated	
1985	Best Tropical Latin Performance	Buscando América	Nominated	
1986	Best Tropical Latin Performance	Mucho Mejor	Nominated	
1987	Best Tropical Latin Performance	Escenas	Won	
1988	Best Tropical Latin Performance	Agua de Luna (Moon Water)	Nominated	
1989	Best Tropical Latin Performance	Antecedente	Won	
1992	Best Tropical Latin Album	Caminando	Nominated	
1993	Best Tropical Latin Album	Amor y Control	Nominated	
1996	Best Tropical Latin Performance	Tras la Tormenta (with Willie Colón)	Nominated	
1997	Best Tropical Latin Performance	La Rosa de los Vientos	Won	
2000	Best Latin Pop Performance	Tiempos	Won	
2003	Best World Music Album	Mundo	Won	
2005	Best Salsa/Merengue Album	Across 110th Street (with Spanish Harlem Orchestra)	Won	
2015	Best Latin Pop Album	Tangos	Won	
2016	Best Tropical Latin Album	Son de Panamá (with Roberto Delgado & Orquesta)	Won	
2018	Best Tropical Latin Album	Salsa Big Band (with Roberto Delgado & Orquesta)	Won	
2020	Best Latin Jazz Album	Una Noche con Rubén Blades (with Jazz at Lincoln Center Orchestra and Wynton Marsalis)	Nominated	
2022	Best Tropical Latin Album	Salswing! (with Roberto Delgado & Orquesta)	Won	
2023	Best Latin Pop Album	Pasieros (with Boca Livre)	Won	
2024	Best Tropical Latin Album	Siembra: 45º Aniversario (En Vivo en el Coliseo de Puerto Rico, 14 de Mayo 2022)	Won	
2026	Best Tropical Latin Album	Fotografías (with Roberto Delgado & Orquestra)	Pending	

=== Latin Grammy Awards ===
Year	Category	Nominated work	Result	Ref.
2000	Record of the Year	"Tiempos"	Nominated	
2003	Album of the Year	Mundo	Nominated	
2003	Best Contemporary Tropical Album	Mundo	Won	
2009	Best Short Form Music Video	"La Perla" (with Calle 13)	Won	
2010	Song of the Year	"Las Calles"	Nominated	
2010	Best Singer-Songwriter Album	Cantares del Subdesarrollo	Won	
2011	Best Salsa Album	Todos Vuelven Live (with Seis Del Solar)	Won	
2011	Best Long Form Music Video	Todos Vuelven Live (with Seis Del Solar)	Nominated	
2012	Best Salsa Album	Eba Say Ajá (with Cheo Feliciano)	Nominated	
2014	Album of the Year	Tangos	Nominated	
2014	Best Tango Album	Tangos	Won	
2015	Album of the Year	Son de Panamá (with Roberto Delgado & Orquesta)	Nominated	
2015	Best Salsa Album	Son de Panamá (with Roberto Delgado & Orquesta)	Won	
2017	Record of the Year	"La Flor de la Canela"	Nominated	
2017	Album of the Year	Salsa Big Band (with Roberto Delgado & Orquesta)	Won	
2017	Best Salsa Album	Salsa Big Band (with Roberto Delgado & Orquesta)	Won	
2018	Best Traditional Tropical Album	Medoro Madera (with Roberto Delgado & Orquesta)	Nominated	
2019	Album of the Year	Paraíso Road Gang	Nominated	
2019	Song of the Year	"El País"	Nominated	
2020	Best Tropical Song	"Canción para Rubén" (with Carlos Vives)	Won	
2021	Person of the Year		Recipient	
2021	Best Salsa Album	Salsa Plus! (with Roberto Delgado & Orquesta)	Won	
2021	Album of the Year	Salswing! (with Roberto Delgado & Orquesta)	Won	
2024	Song of the Year	"Aún Me Sigo Encontrando" – Rubén Blades, Gian Marco & Julio Reyes Copello, songwriters (Gian Marco & Rubén Blades)	Nominated	
2024	Best Salsa Album	Siembra: 45° Aniversario (En Vivo en el Coliseo de Puerto Rico, 14 de Mayo 2022), Rubén Blades and Roberto Delgado & Orquesta	Won	

At the 4th Annual Latin Grammy Awards, Mundo also received a nomination for Best Engineered Album, which went to engineers Walter Flores, Oscar Marín, Daniela Pastore and Edín Solís.
