= Jon Fausty =

American audio engineer and producer (1949–2023)

- Born: February 20, 1949; Westchester County, New York, U.S.
- Died: September 29, 2023 (aged 74) Tampa, Florida, U.S.
- Genres: Salsa
- Occupations: Audio engineer, producer
- Years active: 1964–2022
- Label: Fania Records

Jon Evan Fausty (February 20, 1949 – September 29, 2023) was an American multiple Grammy Award-winning sound and recording engineer best known for his work on some of the most successful Latin albums ever recorded.

Fausty's career spanned over six decades. He designed studios, produced and engineered recordings throughout the United States, Canada, Cuba and Europe - both in studio and live performances.

== Early career ==
Born in Westchester, New York, of Russian and Hungarian Jewish ancestry, Fausty “helped shape the sound of Latin music.” Fausty originally wanted to be a radio disc jockey but became interested in sound engineering after a chance visit in 1960 to Mirasound Studios in Manhattan. The engineers allowed him to watch and learn. His first job was at Groove Sound studios where he became Wiley C. Brooks' assistant. After Brooks left, Fausty became the chief engineer at 18 years old. He remained at Groove Studios for one year.

His first Latin recording was for the Cesta All-Stars at Groove Sound. New to Latin music and Latin instruments, he thought that he had botched the recording. He next went to Delta Studios, where he recorded jingles and commercials – and this is where he honed his skills. While at Delta, he recorded an album with Willie Rosario, Charlie Palmieri and Manique. These recordings allowed him to learn the “mathematics” of the salsa sound (clave & tumbao).

== Later career ==
After a chance meeting with Larry Harlow at a friend's jam session, Harlow would later call Fausty and ask him to audition at Good Vibrations Sound Studios (formerly RKO Sound Studios) which was owned by Fania Records. Out of approximately 40 candidates Fausty was hired. Fausty was instrumental in fitting the studio with the latest technology including a retractable ceiling designed specifically to isolate the percussion sections from interfering with other aspects of the recording.

Fausty recorded with Willie Colón, Héctor Lavoe, Ray Barretto, Johnny Pacheco, La Sonora Ponceña, Roberto Roena, Cheo Feliciano, the Lebrón Brothers, Ismael Miranda, Larry Harlow, Típica 73, Fania All-Stars, Bobby Valentin, Javier Vazquez, Pete "El Conde" Rodríguez, Mon Rivera, Tommy Olivencia, Kako, Mongo Santamaría, Lalo Rodríguez, Simon Perez, Rocky Pagán, Joe Cuba, Puerto Rico All Stars, La Lupe, Diego Melón, El Gran Combo, Willie Rosario, Johnny "Dandy" Rodríguez, Jerry González, Eddie Palmieri, Kip Hanrahan, Jack Bruce, Milton Cardona, Roberto Torres, Conjunto Clásico, Daniel Ponce, Los Van Van, David Burn, Angel Canales, Christie Mcfol, Astor Piazzolla, Justo Betancourt, Johnny Ventura, Louie Ramirez, Bobby Rodriguez, Papo Vázquez, Munequitos de Matanzas, Tito Puente, Hilton Ruiz, Bronx Horns, Orlando Valle, Paquito D'Rivera, Yomo Toro, Gilberto Santa Rosa, Chucho Valdés, Manny Oquendo, Puerto Rican Power, Grupo Niche, Chico O'Farrill, George Benson, Jack Bruce, Vocal Sampling, Tito Nieves, Fernando Villalona, Víctor Manuelle, Luis "Perico" Ortiz, Los Vacillos, Esau Delgado, Angel Melendez, Machito Rivera, Ralphy Leavitt, among others.

Fausty had thousands of recordings of which 18 have been awarded Grammy Awards. He won Grammys with Chucho Valdés, Celia Cruz, Rubén Blades, Marc Anthony.

== Death ==
Fausty died on September 29, 2023, in Tampa, Florida at the age of 74.

== Selected discography ==
- 1961 – Sabú's Jazz Espagnole – Sabú Martínez (remastering)
- 1965 – Mozambique – Eddie Palmieri (remastering)
- 1966 – Bad Breath – Bobby Valentín (remastering)
- 1967 – Bravo Celia Cruz – Celia Cruz (remastering)
- 1967 – Con Todos los Hierro – Cortijo / Ismael Rivera (remastering)
- 1967 – Jala Jala y Boogaloo – Ricardo Ray (remastering)
- 1968 – Hacheros Pa' un Palo – La Sonora Ponceña (remastering)
- 1968 – The Hustler – Willie Colón (remastering)
- 1968 – The Tingling Mother's Circus – The Tingling Mother's Circus (engineer)
- 1968 – Soul of Machito – Machito (remastering)
- 1970 – Algo Nuevo – Bobby Valentín (remastering)
- 1970 – Conjunto Clásico – Conjunto Clásico (engineer)
- 1971 – Chivirico – Chivirico Dávila (engineer)
- 1971 – Live at the Cheetah, Vol. 1 – Fania All-Stars (engineer, audio engineer)
- 1972 – Desde Puerto Rico a Nueva York – La Sonora Ponceña (remastering)
- 1972 – En La Union Esta La Fuerza – The Lebrón Brothers (remastering)
- 1972 – La Sonora Poncena – La Sonora Ponceña (engineer)
- 1972 – Recorded Live at Sing Sing, Vol. 1 – Eddie Palmieri (remastering)
- 1972 – The Message – Ray Barretto (remastering)
- 1972 – Visitation – Chirco (production engineer, mixing engineer)
- 1973 – Asalto Navideño, Vol. 2 – Willie Colón / Héctor Lavoe (engineer, audio engineer)
- 1973 – Asi Se Compone un Son – Ismael Miranda (engineer, audio engineer)
- 1973 – Asunto de Familia – The Lebrón Brothers (engineer)
- 1973 – Chivirico – Chivirico Dávila (engineer, audio engineer)
- 1973 – Felicidades – Cheo Feliciano (engineer)
- 1973 – Indestructible – Ray Barretto (engineer, audio engineer, liner notes)
- 1973 – Infinito – Willie Rosario (engineer)
- 1973 – Lo Mato – Willie Colón (engineer, audio engineer, remastering)
- 1973 – Roberto Roena y su Apollo Sound, Vol. 5 – Roberto Roena / Su Apollo Sound (engineer, audio engineer, recording Director)
- 1973 – The Other Road – Ray Barretto (engineer)
- 1973 – Tres de Café y Dos de Azúcar – Johnny Pacheco (engineer)
- 1974 – Celia & Johnny – Celia Cruz / Johnny Pacheco (engineer)
- 1974 – El Conde – Pete "El Conde" Rodríguez (engineer, Audio Production)
- 1974 – En Fa Menor – Ismael Miranda (engineer)
- 1974 – En Una Nota! – Monguito Santamaría (mixing engineer, recording)
- 1974 – In Motion – Bobby Valentín (engineer, audio engineer)
- 1974 – La Verdad (The Truth) – Javier Vázquez y Su Salsa (engineer, mixing engineer)
- 1974 – Latin-Soul-Rock – Fania All-Stars (mixing)
- 1974 – Live at Yankee Stadium – Mongo Santamaría (mixing, mixing engineer)
- 1974 – Love Is...Seguida – Seguida (Assistant)
- 1974 – Rey del Bajo – Bobby Valentín (engineer, audio engineer)
- 1974 – Roberto Roena y su Apollo Sound, Vol. 6 – Roberto Roena (engineer, audio engineer)
- 1974 – Salsa – Larry Harlow / Orchestra Harlow (engineer, audio engineer)
- 1975 – Barretto – Ray Barretto (engineer, remastering)
- 1975 – El Judio Maravilloso – Orchestra Harlow (remastering)
- 1975 – El Maestro – Johnny Pacheco (engineer)
- 1975 – Escucha mi Canción – Paquito Guzmán (engineer)
- 1975 – Este Es Ismael Miranda – Ismael Miranda (engineer)
- 1975 – La Voz – Héctor Lavoe (engineer, audio engineer, liner notes)
- 1975 – Live at Yankee Stadium, Vol. 1 – Fania All-Stars (mixing)
- 1975 – Planté Bandera – Tommy Olivencia (engineer, audio engineer, remastering)
- 1975 – The Good, the Bad, the Ugly – Willie Colón (engineer, audio engineer)
- 1975 – There Goes the Neighborhood – Willie Colón / Mon Rivera (engineer, remastering)
- 1975 – Tremendo Caché – Celia Cruz / Johnny Pacheco (engineer)
- 1976 – Andy Harlow's Latin Fever – Andy Harlow (engineer)
- 1976 – Cocinando la Salsa (Cookin' the Sauce) – Joe Cuba / Joe Cuba Sextet (engineer)
- 1976 – Con Mi Viejo Amigo – Ismael Miranda (engineer)
- 1976 – Conquista Musical – La Sonora Ponceña (engineer)
- 1976 – De Ti Depende (It's Up to You) – Héctor Lavoe (engineer, audio engineer)
- 1976 – El Gigante del Sur – La Sonora Ponceña (engineer, mixing)
- 1976 – Este Negro Si Es Sabroso – Pete "El Conde" Rodríguez (audio engineer)
- 1976 – I Can See – Ralfi Pagán (engineer, mixing)
- 1976 – Introducing Lalo Rodríguez and Simon Pérez – Tommy Olivencia (engineer, audio engineer)
- 1976 – Live at Yankee Stadium, Vol. 2 – Fania All-Stars (mixing, remastering, mixing engineer)
- 1976 – Lucky 7 – Roberto Roena (engineer, audio engineer, remastering)
- 1976 – Para Mi Gente – Chivirico Dávila (engineer, mixing)
- 1976 – Rhythm in the House – Hilton Ruiz (engineer)
- 1976 – Sofrito – Mongo Santamaría (engineer)
- 1976 – Tomorrow: Barretto Live – Ray Barretto (engineer)
- 1976 – Tribute to Tito Rodriguez – Fania All-Stars (engineer, mixing)
- 1976 – Ubane – Mongo Santamaría (engineer)
- 1976 – Union Dinamica – Kako (engineer)
- 1977 – 10th Anniversary – The Lebrón Brothers (engineer, recording)
- 1977 – Con Salsa y Sabor: Charlie Palmieri & Meñique – Charlie Palmieri (remastering)
- 1977 – El Jardinero del Amor – Larry Harlow (engineer)
- 1977 – La Raza Latina: A Salsa Suite – Larry Harlow / Orchestra Harlow (engineer, mixing)
- 1977 – Llegó Melón – Johnny Pacheco (engineer)
- 1977 – Metiendo Mano! – Rubén Blades / Willie Colón (engineer)
- 1977 – Mintiendo se Gana Más – Paquito Guzmán (mixing)
- 1977 – No Voy Al Festival – Ismael Miranda (engineer, remastering)
- 1977 – One of a Kind (Unica en Su Clase) – La Lupe (engineer)
- 1977 – Only They Could Have Made This Album – Willie Colón / Celia Cruz (engineer, audio engineer)
- 1977 – Puerto Rico All Stars – Puerto Rico All Stars (engineer, mixing)
- 1977 – Roberto Roena y su Apollo Sound, Vol. 9 – Roberto Roena (engineer)
- 1978 – 49 Minutes – Willie Colón (engineer)
- 1978 – A Todo Mis Amigos – Celia Cruz (remastering)
- 1978 – Comedia – Héctor Lavoe (engineer, mixing)
- 1978 – El Albino Divino – Larry Harlow (engineer, mixing)
- 1978 – El Progreso – Roberto Roena (remastering)
- 1978 – Explorando – La Sonora Ponceña (engineer, audio engineer)
- 1978 – Fiesta de Soneros – Tommy Olivencia (mixing, recording)
- 1978 – La 8va. Maravilla – Roberto Roena (engineer)
- 1978 – Peligro – Paquito Guzmán (engineer, mixing)
- 1978 – Siembra – Rubén Blades / Willie Colón (engineer, audio engineer, liner notes)
- 1978 – The Brillante – Celia Cruz (engineer)
- 1979 – El Rey del Ritmo – Willie Rosario (engineer)
- 1979 – Recordando a Felipe Pirela – Héctor Lavoe (engineer, mixing)
- 1979 – Solo – Willie Colón (engineer, audio engineer, recording Director, Live Sound engineer)
- 1980 – Dandy's Dandy: A Latin Affair – Latin Percussionists (engineer, Remixing)
- 1980 – El De a 20 De Willie – Willie Rosario (mixing)
- 1980 – Maestra Vida: Primera Parte – Rubén Blades (engineer, audio engineer, mixing)
- 1980 – Maestra Vida: Segunda Parte – Rubén Blades (engineer, audio engineer, mixing)
- 1980 – Unity – El Gran Combo de Puerto Rico (engineer)
- 1981 – Canciones del Solar de los Aburridos – Rubén Blades / Willie Colón (engineer)
- 1981 – Carabalí – Carabalí (mixing)
- 1981 – Fantasmas – Willie Colón (engineer, audio engineer, Remixing)
- 1981 – Happy Days – El Gran Combo de Puerto Rico (mixing)
- 1981 – The Portrait of a Salsa Man – Willie Rosario (mixing)
- 1982 – Calidad – Adalberto Santiago (remastering)
- 1982 – Corazón Guerrero – Willie Colón (engineer, audio engineer, Technical Director)
- 1982 – Coup de Tête – Kip Hanrahan (engineer, mixing, Editing, Overdubs)
- 1982 – Criollo – The Lebrón Brothers (remastering)
- 1982 – Desire Develops an Edge – Kip Hanrahan (engineer, mixing)
- 1982 – El Encuentro – Johnny Rodríguez y Su Orquestra (engineer, mixing)
- 1982 – Super Apollo 47:50 – Roberto Roena / Adalberto Santiago (remastering)
- 1982 – The Last Fight – Rubén Blades / Willie Colón (engineer, mixing)
- 1982 – The River Is Deep – Jerry González (mixing)
- 1982 – Totico Y Sus Rumberos – Totico Y Sus Rumberos (engineer, remastering, Digital remastering)
- 1982 – Ya Yo Me Cure – Jerry González (engineer)
- 1982 – Yo Soy Latino – Larry Harlow / Orchestra Harlow (engineer)
- 1983 – Bahía – Gato Barbieri (remastering)
- 1983 – El Que la Hace la Paga – Rubén Blades (engineer, mixing)
- 1983 – Vigilante – Willie Colón / Héctor Lavoe (engineer, mixing, recording Director)
- 1984 – Carabalí 2 – Carabalí (mixing)
- 1984 – Lo Que Pide La Gente – Fania All-Stars (remastering)
- 1985 – A Few Short Notes from the End Run – Kip Hanrahan (engineer)
- 1985 – Bembe – Milton Cardona (engineer, audio engineer)
- 1985 – Conjure: Music for the Texts of Ishmael Reed – (mixing)
- 1985 – Vertical's Currency – Kip Hanrahan (engineer, mixing)
- 1986 – Elegantemente Criollo – Roberto Torres (engineer, mixing)
- 1986 – Live in Japan 1976 – Fania All-Stars (remastering)
- 1987 – Afro Caribbean Jazz – Batacumbele (Sequencing, Mixdown engineer)
- 1987 – Arawe – Daniel Ponce (engineer)
- 1987 – Así Es Mi Pueblo – Conjunto Clásico (engineer)
- 1987 – En Su Décimoquinto Aniversario – Johnny Ventura (engineer)
- 1988 – Antecedente – Rubén Blades / Rubén Blades y Son del Solar (engineer, mixing)
- 1988 – Days and Nights of Blue Luck Inverted – Kip Hanrahan (engineer, mixing)
- 1988 – Maelo...El Único – Ismael Rivera (mastering engineer)
- 1988 – Music From Do the Right Thing – (engineer, mixing, mixing engineer)
- 1988 – Songo – Los Van Van (producer, engineer, mixing)
- 1988 – Windsong – Rachel Faro (engineer)
- 1989 – Live Session, Vol. 2 – Steve Nelson / Bobby Watson (engineer)
- 1989 – Rei Momo – David Byrne (engineer, Production Coordination)
- 1989 – Samba de Flora – Airto / Airto Moreira (engineer)
- 1989 – Sueño – Eddie Palmieri (producer, engineer, mixing, Editing)
- 1990 – Routes of Rhythm, Vol. 1: Carnival of Cuba – (Editing, Post production engineer)
- 1990 – Routes of Rhythm, Vol. 2 (Cuban Dance Party) – (Editing, Post production engineer)
- 1990 – Rubén Blades y Son del Solar...Live! – Rubén Blades / Rubén Blades y Son del Solar (mixing)
- 1990 – Salt & Tabasco – (producer)
- 1991 – Caminando – Rubén Blades / Rubén Blades y Son del Solar (engineer)
- 1991 – Electric Landlady – Kirsty MacColl (engineer, audio engineer, mixing)
- 1991 – Harlem Blues – Satan & Adam (Editing)
- 1991 – Salsa Y Sabor – (engineer, mastering engineer, producer, recording producer)
- 1991 – Ya es Tiempo (It's Time) – Ángel Canales (engineer)
- 1992 – Amor y Control – Rubén Blades y Son del Solar (engineer, mixing)
- 1992 – Con El Sabor De...Roberto Torres – Roberto Torres (engineer, mixing)
- 1992 – El Caballo Negro – Johnny Ventura (engineer)
- 1992 – Fe Esperanza Y Caridad – Henry Fiol (engineer, mixing)
- 1992 – Interpretan a Rafael Hernández – SAR All Stars (engineer, mixing)
- 1992 – Irresistible – Ray Barretto (remastering)
- 1992 – Justo Betancourt – Justo Betancourt (engineer)
- 1992 – Llegó la India Vía Eddie Palmieri – India (engineer, mixing, Editing)
- 1992 – Music Makers – Bonny Cepeda (engineer)
- 1992 – Pa' Bravo Yo – Justo Betancourt (engineer, remastering)
- 1992 – Pepe Mora – Pepe Mora (engineer)
- 1992 – Recuerda a Portabales – Roberto Torres (mixing)
- 1992 – Rinde Homenaje a Abelardo Barroso – Papaíto (engineer, mixing)
- 1992 – Routes of Rhythm, Vol. 3 – Isaac Oviedo (engineer, Editing)
- 1992 – Tango: Zero Hour – Astor Piazzolla (engineer, mixing)
- 1992 – Y Buena Que Esta...Maria – Johnny Ventura (engineer)
- 1993 – Bonita – Santos Colón (mixing)
- 1993 – Breakout – Papo Vázquez (engineer)
- 1993 – Carlito's Way – (engineer, mixing)
- 1993 – Como Nunca – Orlando Watussi (mixing)
- 1993 – Latin from Manhattan – Bobby Rodríguez (engineer)
- 1993 – Lo Pasado, Pasado – Junior González (mixing)
- 1993 – Lo Sabemos – Justo Betancourt (engineer, mixing)
- 1993 – Mambo Mongo – Mongo Santamaría (mixing, producer, recording, recording producer)
- 1993 – Ode to Life – Don Pullen / Don Pullen & The African-Brazilian Connection (engineer)
- 1993 – Otra Noche Caliente – Louie Ramírez (engineer, mixing, mastering)
- 1993 – Prepárate Bailador – Ray de la Paz (engineer)
- 1993 – The Late Masterpieces – Astor Piazzolla (engineer, mixing)
- 1993 – The Rough Dancer and the Cyclical Night (Tango Apasionado) – Astor Piazzolla (mixing, mixing engineer)
- 1993 – Willie & Tito – Willie Colón / Tito Puente (remastering)
- 1994 – Canta Fernando Lavoy – Los Soneros (engineer, mixing)
- 1994 – Charlie Rodríguez & Rey Reyes – Charlie Rodríguez (engineer, mixing)
- 1994 – Conjunto Crema – Conjunto Crema (engineer, mixing)
- 1994 – Darn It! – Paul Haines (engineer)
- 1994 – El Rey de Corazones – Manny Manuel (mastering)
- 1994 – Familia Rmm En Vivo – (producer, engineer, Director, mixing)
- 1994 – Feliz Christmas – Orquesta de la Luz (engineer, mixing)
- 1994 – Juan Vicente Zambrano – Sonora Miami (mixing)
- 1994 – Palmas – Eddie Palmieri (mixing)
- 1994 – Poems by Paul Haines Musics by Many – Paul Haines (engineer)
- 1994 – Salsomania – Orquesta Novel (engineer)
- 1994 – Sentimiento Del Latino en Nueva York – Ángel Canales (engineer)
- 1995 – Live In Puerto Rico: June 11, 1994 – Fania All-Stars (engineer, audio engineer, recording)
- 1995 – Arete – Eddie Palmieri (mixing, mastering)
- 1995 – Blue in the Face – (mixing)
- 1995 – Cab Calloway Stands in for the Moon – Conjure (engineer)
- 1995 – Catch the Feeling – The Bronx Horns (mixing)
- 1995 – Charanga Casino [#2] – Charanga Casino (engineer, mixing)
- 1995 – Fiesta No Es Para Feos – Alfredito Valdéz, Jr. (engineer, mixing)
- 1995 – Hands on Percussion – Hilton Ruiz (engineer, mixing)
- 1995 – Ismael Quintana – Ismael Quintana (engineer)
- 1995 – Llegó La Ley – Conjunto Clásico (engineer)
- 1995 – Look No Further – Rozalla (engineer)
- 1995 – Lucharé – Mickey Taveras (engineer)
- 1995 – Otra Vez Con Amor – Vitín Avilés (engineer)
- 1995 – Rip a Dip – Pucho & His Latin Soul Brothers (recording)
- 1995 – Sabor de la Luz – Orquesta de la Luz (engineer, mixing)
- 1995 – Si No Bailen con Ellos, No Bailen con Nadie – Conjunto Clásico (engineer)
- 1995 – Sorpresa La Flauta – Andy Harlow (engineer, audio engineer, mixing)
- 1995 – The Pérez Family – (engineer, mixing)
- 1995 – Tito's Idea – Tito Puente (engineer, mastering)
- 1995 – Trombone Man – J.P. Torres (engineer, mixing, mastering)
- 1995 – Una Forma Más – Vocal Sampling (mixing)
- 1995 – Vacunao – Los Muñequitos de Matanzas (engineer)
- 1996 – Celebremos Navidad – Yomo Toro (engineer)
- 1996 – Combinación Perfecta – (engineer, mixing, recording)
- 1996 – Cuba Jazz – Paquito D'Rivera (engineer, mastering)
- 1996 – Fuji Time – Adewale Ayuba (engineer)
- 1996 – Gran Encuentro – (mastering)
- 1996 – Havana Calling – Maraca y Otra Visión (mixing)
- 1996 – Ito Iban Echu: Sacred Yoruba Music of Cuba – Los Muñequitos de Matanzas (engineer)
- 1996 – Jazzin' – Tito Puente (engineer, audio engineer, mixing, mastering)
- 1996 – Nada Será Igual – Jesús Enríquez (engineer, mixing)
- 1996 – Papa Boco – Adela Dalto (engineer, mixing)
- 1996 – Punto De Partida – Amparo Sandino (mixing)
- 1996 – Salsa Explosion – (engineer, Post producer, Live recording)
- 1996 – Super Cuban All Stars: Made in the USA – (engineer, mixing)
- 1996 – Tropical Tribute to the Beatles – (mixing)
- 1996 – TropiJazz All-Stars, Vol. 1 – TropiJazz All-Stars (engineer, mixing, mastering)
- 1996 – Vortex – Eddie Palmieri (engineer, mastering)
- 1997 – A Thousand Nights and a Night (Shadow Night) – Kip Hanrahan (engineer, mixing)
- 1997 – Cuban Gold, Vol. 3: Mambo Me Priva – (mastering)
- 1997 – De Corazón – Gilberto Santa Rosa (mixing)
- 1997 – De Vacaciones – Vocal Sampling (mixing)
- 1997 – Island Eyes – Hilton Ruiz (engineer, mixing, mastering)
- 1997 – Monsters from the Deep – Ned Sublette / Lawrence Weiner (engineer, mastering)
- 1997 – Que Vacile Mi Gente – D'Mingo (mixing)
- 1997 – Reconfirmando – Johnny Almendra (mastering)
- 1997 – Rise – Veronica (mixing)
- 1997 – TropiJazz All-Stars, Vol. 2 – TropiJazz All-Stars (engineer, mixing, mastering)
- 1998 – Bele Bele en La Habana – Chucho Valdés (engineer, mixing, mixing engineer)
- 1998 – Cielo de Acuarela – Lourdes Robles (engineer, mixing)
- 1998 – Como Tú Quieras – Ray de la Paz (engineer)
- 1998 – Cuban Gold, Vol. 5: Pa' Bailar – (mastering)
- 1998 – Dance with Me – (engineer, mixing)
- 1998 – Dancemania '99: Live at Birdland – Tito Puente (engineer, mixing)
- 1998 – Demasiado Corazón – Willie Colón (mixing)
- 1998 – El Rumbero del Piano – Eddie Palmieri (engineer, mixing)
- 1998 – Imagínate – Raúl Paz (engineer)
- 1998 – Live – Chucho Valdés (mixing)
- 1998 – Live [CD] – Los Jóvenes del Barrio (mixing)
- 1998 – Nadie Nos Va a Detener – Salsa Kids (mastering)
- 1998 – Regalo del Ciego (Blindman's Gift) – Son de Loma (engineer, mixing)
- 1998 – Shadow Nights, Vol. 1 – Kip Hanrahan (engineer)
- 1999 – Ahora – Manny Oquendo (engineer)
- 1999 – Ancestral Reflections – Frank Emilio Flynn (engineer, mixing)
- 1999 – Briyumba Palo Congo – Chucho Valdés (engineer)
- 1999 – Cambucha – Milton Cardona (engineer)
- 1999 – Cowboy Rumba – Ned Sublette (engineer)
- 1999 – El Son de Ahora – Carolina Laó (mixing)
- 1999 – Mambo Birdland – Tito Puente (engineer, mixing)
- 1999 – Piazzolla: La Camorra – Astor Piazzolla (engineer)
- 1999 – Shadow Nights, Vol. 2 – Kip Hanrahan (engineer)
- 1999 – Simplemente Yayo – Yayo el Indio (mixing engineer, recording)
- 1999 – Trátame Como Soy – Nora (mixing engineer)
- 2000 – A Calm in the Fire of Dances – Deep Rumba (engineer)
- 2000 – A Golpe de Folklore – Grupo Niche (engineer)
- 2000 – Absolute Benson – George Benson (engineer)
- 2000 – Así Soy – Charlie Cruz (engineer, mixing, Remix engineer)
- 2000 – Carambola – Chico O'Farrill (mixing)
- 2000 – Celia Cruz and Friends: A Night of Salsa – Celia Cruz (producer, mixing, Live recording)
- 2000 – Es Deferente – Los Jóvenes del Barrio (producer)
- 2000 – Latitudes – Alfredo de la Fé (engineer, mixing)
- 2000 – Live at the Village Vanguard – Chucho Valdés (engineer)
- 2000 – Los New Yorkinos – Manny Oquendo (engineer, mixing engineer)
- 2000 – Masterpiece/Obra Maestra – Eddie Palmieri / Tito Puente (engineer, mixing)
- 2000 – Men in Salsa – Puerto Rican Power Orchestra (mixing)
- 2000 – Romántico Y Salsero – Raúl Marrero (mixing)
- 2000 – Soneros de Cuba Y New York – Angelo Vaillant (engineer)
- 2000 – Soy La Ley – Pete "El Conde" Rodríguez (remastering)
- 2001 – 60 Anos de Historia Grabado en Copacabana – (engineer, mixing)
- 2001 – Cambio de Tiempo – Vocal Sampling (engineer, mixing)
- 2001 – Gourmet Music Deluxe: Brazil – (engineer, mixing)
- 2001 – Intenso – Gilberto Santa Rosa (engineer, mixing, recording)
- 2001 – La Negra Tiene Tumbao – Celia Cruz (mixing engineer)
- 2001 – Selections 1997-2000 – Monday Michiru (engineer, mixing)
- 2001 – Shadows in the Air – Jack Bruce (engineer, mixing)
- 2001 – Solo: Live in New York – Chucho Valdés (Sequencers)
- 2001 – Un Chico Malo – Charlie Cruz (engineer)
- 2001 – Wild Wild Salsa – Puerto Rican Power Orchestra (mixing engineer)
- 2002 – 2002 Latin Grammy Nominees – (engineer)
- 2002 – Brazilian Flavour, Vol. 2 – (engineer, mixing)
- 2002 – Caraluna – Bacilos (engineer, mixing)
- 2002 – Jamming – Luis "Perico" Ortíz (engineer, mixing)
- 2002 – La Perfecta II – Eddie Palmieri (engineer, mixing, mixing engineer)
- 2002 – Le Preguntaba a la Luna – Víctor Manuelle (mastering)
- 2002 – Mal Acostumbrado – Fernando Villalona (engineer, mixing)
- 2002 – Muy Agradecido – Tito Nieves (mixing)
- 2002 – Tremenda Rumba! – Maraca (engineer, mixing)
- 2002 – Viceversa – Gilberto Santa Rosa (mixing)
- 2003 – A Puro Fuego – Olga Tañón (engineer)
- 2003 – Cigar Lounge, Vol. 3 – (engineer)
- 2003 – Cravin – Shae (mixing)
- 2003 – Cubalive!: Recorded Live in Cuba – (Editing, Post production engineer)
- 2003 – Inesperado – Frankie Negrón (engineer, mixing)
- 2003 – More Jack Than God – Jack Bruce (engineer, mixing)
- 2003 – Music for My Peoples – Huey Dunbar (engineer, mixing engineer)
- 2003 – New Conceptions – Chucho Valdés (mixing)
- 2003 – Regalo del Alma – Celia Cruz (engineer, mixing)
- 2003 – Ritmo Caliente – Eddie Palmieri (engineer, mixing)
- 2003 – Versos en el Cielo – Issac Delgado (engineer, mixing)
- 2004 – Ángel Meléndez & the 911 Mambo Orchestra – Ángel Meléndez (engineer, audio engineer, mixing)
- 2004 – Auténtico – Gilberto Santa Rosa (engineer, mixing)
- 2004 – Ay! Que Rico – José Conde y Ola Fresca (mixing engineer)
- 2004 – Clásicas De Clásico – Conjunto Clásico (engineer, mixing)
- 2004 – Daniel Santos Con Conjunto Clásico – Daniel Santos (engineer, mixing)
- 2004 – El Panadero – Conjunto Clásico (engineer)
- 2004 – Havana Dreams – Sonia Santana (mixing engineer)
- 2004 – La Experiencia – Celia Cruz (engineer, mastering engineer, recording)
- 2004 – Las Puertas Abiertas – Conjunto Clásico (engineer)
- 2004 – Live at Yankee Stadium – Fania All-Stars (mixing)
- 2004 – Rasin Kreyol – Emeline Michel (engineer, mixing)
- 2004 – Romántico – Cheo Feliciano (remastering)
- 2004 – The Big 3: Live at the Blue Note – The Palladium Orchestra (engineer, mixing)
- 2004 – The Greatest Live recordings of Fania All Stars – Fania All-Stars (engineer)
- 2004 – Valió la Pena – Marc Anthony (engineer, audio engineer, mixing)
- 2004 – Yo! – Silvana Deluigi (engineer)
- 2005 – Bembé en Mi Casa – Nachito Herrera (mixing)
- 2005 – Concord Picante 25th Anniversary Collection – (engineer, mixing, recording)
- 2005 – Conjunto Candela '79 – Conjunto Candela (engineer, mixing)
- 2005 – From Croydon to Cuba: An Anthology – Kirsty MacColl (engineer, mixing)
- 2005 – Imagínate – La Charanga 76 (engineer, mixing)
- 2005 – Listen Here! – Eddie Palmieri (engineer, audio engineer, mixing)
- 2005 – Retrato Musical – Chocolate (engineer)
- 2005 – Soy Yo – Maraca (mixing)
- 2005 – The Best of Kirsty MacColl – Kirsty MacColl (engineer)
- 2006 – El Maestro: A Man and His Music – Johnny Pacheco (recording)
- 2006 – Every Child Is Born A Poet: The Life & Work of Piri Thomas – Piri Thomas (engineer)
- 2006 – Nightlife/Essence of Life – Benítez & Nebula (engineer)
- 2006 – Salsa at Woodstock Recorded Live – Bobby Rodríguez (engineer)
- 2007 – A Night of Salsa: Broadway Edition – Celia Cruz (engineer, mixing)
- 2007 – Asalto Navideño, Vols. 1-2 – Willie Colón / Héctor Lavoe / Yomo Toro (engineer, audio engineer)
- 2007 – The Player – Willie Colón (engineer, mastering)
- 2007 – ¡Gracias Joe Cuba! – Nils Fischer / Timbazo (mixing, mastering)
- 2008 – A Tribute to Gonzalo Asencio Tío Tom 1919-1991 – El Conjunto Todo Rumbero / Orlando "Puntilla" Ríos (audio engineer, mixing)
- 2008 – Con el Diablo en el Hombro – Damián Rivero (mixing)
- 2008 – Cosquillita – Raphy Leavitt / Raphy Leavitt La Selecta Orchestra (mixing)
- 2008 – Lo Que Quiero Es Fiesta!!!! – Maraca (audio engineer, mixing)
- 2008 – The Complete Studio Albums, Vol. 1 – Héctor Lavoe (engineer, mixing)
- 2009 – 107th Street Stickball Team: Saboreando Pot Full of Soul – The 107th Street Stickball Team (engineer)
- 2009 – Beautiful Star – Odetta (engineer)
- 2009 – The Complete Studio Albums, Vol. 2 – Héctor Lavoe (engineer)
- 2011 – Best of Odetta – Odetta (engineer)
- 2011 – Live at the Milkyway – Jack Bruce / The Cuicoland Express (engineer)
- 2011 – Live in Africa – Fania All-Stars (engineer)
- 2012 – Live In Puerto Rico: June 11, 1994 – Fania All-Stars (engineer)
- 2013 – The Very Best of Kirsty MacColl: A New England – Kirsty MacColl (mixing)
- 2018 – Days: 1988-1991 – Kirsty MacColl (engineer, mixing)
- 2020 – Back to the Great Sound – Calle Maestra (mastering, mixing)
- 2022 – The American Clavé recordings – Astor Piazzolla (engineer, mixing)
