= Juancito Torres =

Puerto Rican Latin jazz & Salsa musician

Juancito Torres (Juan Torres Velez)
- Born: January 14, 1936; Caguas, Puerto Rico
- Died: July 26, 2003 (aged 67) Carolina, Puerto Rico
- Genres: Afro-Cuban jazz; salsa; son cubano; boogaloo; pachanga
- Occupations: Musician, Arranger, Musical Director, Composer, Producer
- Instrument: Trumpet
- Years active: 1950–2003
- Labels: Combo Records; Fania
- Formerly of: Fania All-Stars

Juan “Juancito” Torres Velez (January 14, 1936 – July 26, 2003), also known as "La Trompeta Nacional De Puerto Rico", was a Puerto Rican salsa and jazz trumpet player, composer, arranger, producer and musical director best known for his association with the Fania All-Stars from 1979 to 1985. He was known as a great soloist, specializing in upper register.

== Early life ==
Torres was born in Caguas Puerto Rico on January 14, 1936, and began in music by playing violin in his hometown, where he belonged to the Municipal Band. Torres began formal musical studies at the age of fourteen when he enrolled at the Escuela Libre de Música. In 1952 he joined the orchestra of jazz musician Ramón Usera Vives. In 1955 he moved to New York City, where he performed with Xavier Cugat, Noro Morales and Lecuona Cuban Boys. He also performed with the orchestras of Pupi Campo and Tito Rodríguez as well as with René Touzet, Dámaso Pérez Prado and Eddie Cano.

Torres returned to Puerto Rico in 1960 and continued his studies at the Conservatory of Music of Puerto Rico. He would later become the trumpet player for the Puerto Rico All Stars as well as Batacumbele.

== Career ==
Torres performed with some of the best artists of the 1950s Latin big band era, including that of Rafael Muñoz, Miguelito Miranda and Moncho Usera's orchestra as well as with the Noro Morales Orchestra based out of the La Concha Hotel in San Juan, Puerto Rico. In 1965 he recorded an album with Bobby Capó and his Orchestra. At the end of the sixties, Torres joined the orchestra of Bobby Valentín, who was also a trumpet player, with whom he participated in the recording of five albums between 1969 and 1975. During the 1970s he recorded with Frank Ferrer, Justo Betancourt, Puerto Rico All Stars and Marvin Santiago.

He also performed with Tito Rodriguez, Joe Quijano, Sexteto Silver, Charlie Palmieri, Johnny Pacheco, Bobby Valentin and many other Latin Jazz musicians. In 1979 Vélez began recording, and performing in international tours with the famous Fania All Stars orchestra. Between 1979 and 1997, he performed and recorded Johny Pacheco for Jerry Masucci, on multiple albums. These include: Habana Jam, Commitment, Latin Connection, Lo que Pide la Gente, "Live", Viva Colombia and Bravo. He has also recorded and performed with Cheo Feliciano, Tommy Olivencia and his Orchestra, Raphy Leavitt and La Selecta, Adalberto Santiago, Roberto Roena, Sonora Ponceña, Eddie Palmieri, Tito Rojas, Pedro Arroyo, Descarga Boricua, Lalo Rodríguez and Ray Barreto and Tito Puente among many others. In 1992, he joined the Dutch salsa orchestra Nueva Manteca.

== Death ==
Torres died on July 27, 2003, in Carolina Puerto Rico, in his sleep from a heart attack.

== Selected discography ==
External audio
- You may listen to DOÑA TERI & EDDIE PALMIERI & JUANCITO TORRES on YouTube.

- 2010 Ponte Duro: The Fania All Stars Story Fania All-Stars Soloist, Trumpet
- 2008 Campeones: A Band and Their Music Fania All-Stars Soloist, Trumpet
- 2008 Cien Anos Con Albizu Andrés Jiménez Trumpet
- 2008 Trompeta Tropical Humberto Ramírez Primary Artist, Trumpet
- 2004 Fuerza Gigante: Live in Puerto Rico April 27, 2001 Ray Barretto Trumpet
- 2003 Cuban All Jazz [Tropical] Trumpet
- 2003 Feeling Good Again Charlie Sepulveda Flugelhorn, Guest Artist
- 2003 Las Noches de Nydia Nydia Caro Trumpet
- 2002 Paradise Humberto Ramírez Flugelhorn, Trumpet
- 2001 Barreto 50th Anniversary Ray Barretto Trumpet
- 2001 El Duque de la Salsa Herb Flores Trumpet
- 2001 Union Puya Trumpet
- 1999 50 Anos en Su Musica Miguelito Miranda Trumpet
- 1999 Bobby Capo y Orquesta Bobby Capó Trumpet
- 1999 Interpreta a Placido Acevedo Anoranzas y Quimeras Gilberto Monroig Guest Artist, Trumpet
- 1999 Noche Caliente Trumpet
- 1999 Puerto Rican Jazz Caunedo y Su Orquesta Primary Artist, Trumpet
- 1998 Roberto Clemente: Un Tributo Musical (Tribute in Song) Trumpet
- 1998 Somos Uno Descarga Boricua Trumpet
- 1997 Bravo 97 Fania All-Stars Trumpet
- 1997 Carlos David Carlos David Trumpet
- 1997 Personal Hector Rey Trumpet
- 1997 Roberto Roena y Su Apollo Sound: Mi Música 1997 Roberto Roena Trumpet
- 1997 Volver Tito Gomez Trumpet
- 1996 Abrazate: Descarga Boricua, Vol. 2 Descarga Boricua Collaboration, Trumpet
- 1996 De Regreso Puerto Rico All Stars Trumpet
- 1995 Live: June 11–1994, Puerto Rico Fania All-Stars Soloist, Trumpet, Unknown Contributor Role
- 1994 El Maestro Nino Segarra Trumpet
- 1994 Naci Para Cantar Lalo Rodríguez Trumpet
- 1993 Lo Sabemos Justo Betancourt Flugelhorn
- 1992 A Dos Tiempos de un Tiempo Gilberto Santa Rosa Flugelhorn, Trumpet
- 1992 Capricornio Dario Estrella Trumpet
- 1991 Fuego a La Jicotea [TH Rodven] Marvin Santiago Trumpet
- 1991 Tropico Pedro Arroyo Trumpet
- 1990 Con Mas Power Puerto Rican Power Orchestra Trumpet
- 1990 Te Tengo Que Olvidar Sergio Hernandez Trumpet
- 1989 Live Session, Vol. 2 Steve Nelson Flugelhorn
- 1989 Vine Pa’ Quedarme Pedro Arroyo Trumpet
- 1985 El Nino, El Hombre, El Sonador, El Loco Lalo Rodríguez Flugelhorn
- 1984 Lo Que Pide La Gente Fania All-Stars Trumpet
- 1982 Calidad Adalberto Santiago Main Personnel, Trumpet
- 1982 Determination La Sonora Ponceña Flugelhorn, Main Personnel
- 1982 Profundo Cheo Feliciano Flugelhorn, Main Personnel
- 1982 Super Apollo 47:50 Roberto Roena Main Personnel, Trumpet
- 1981 Latin Connection Fania All-Stars Trumpet
- 1981 Social Change Fania All-Stars Flugelhorn, Trumpet
- 1981 Un Triangulo de Triunfo Tommy Olivencia Trumpet
- 1980 Commitment Fania All-Stars Flugelhorn, Trumpet
- 1980 Sentimiento Tu Cheo Feliciano Flugelhorn, Main Personnel, Trumpet
- 1978 Los Profesionales Puerto Rico All Stars Composer, Producer, Trumpet, Vocals, Vocals (Background)
- 1977 Puerto Rico All Stars Puerto Rico All Stars Trumpet
- 1976 Puerto Rico All Stars Puerto Rico All Stars Trumpet
- 1974 In Motion Bobby Valentín Featured Artist, Trumpet
- 1974 Aleluyah Frank Ferrer, Trumpet
- 1969 Se La Comió Bobby Valentin, Trumpet
- 1964 Bobby Capó And His Orchestra, Trumpet

== See also ==
- Charanga (Cuba)
