= Lo Mejor =

Lo Mejor (Spanish "The Best") may refer to:

- Lo Mejor (LeBron Brothers album), 1992
- Lo Mejor (Myriam Hernández album), 1997
- Lo Mejor (Grupo Niche album), 1998
- Lo Mejor, a 2004 album by Johnny Pacheco
- Lo Mejor de A.B. Quintanilla III y Los Kumbia Kings, a 2016 album
- Lo mejor de Bosé, Miguel Bosé
- Lo Mejor de Marcos, or several sequel albums by Marcos Witt
- Lo Mejor de...Selena, a 2015 album by Selena

== See also ==
- Simplemente Lo Mejor, a 2008 album by Ricardo Arjona
- Lo Mejor de Mí, a 1997 album by Cristian Castro
- "Lo Mejor de Mí" (song), song written by Rudy Pérez and first recorded by Juan Ramon
- The Best (disambiguation)
