= Viguié =

Viguié is a surname. Notable people with the surname include:

- Debbie Viguié (born 1973), American author
- Juan Emilio Viguié (1891–1966), Puerto Rican filmmaker
- Juan Emilio Viguié Jr. (1923–2004), Puerto Rican producer
