= Noro Morales =

Puerto Rican pianist (1911–1964)

Norberto “Noro” Morales
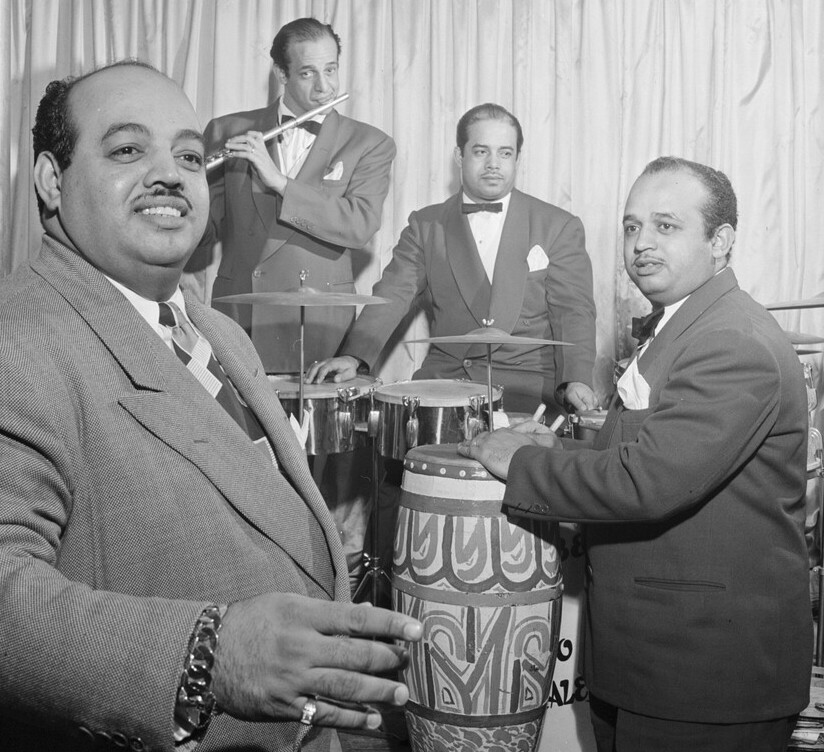
- Noro Morales (left) with his brothers Ismael better known as "Esy" Morales Jose “Pepito” and Humberto, c. 1947

Background information
- Born: Norosboldo Morales; January 4, 1911; Puerta de Tierra, San Juan, Puerto Rico
- Died: January 15, 1964 (aged 53) San Juan, Puerto Rico
- Genres: Rhumba; mambo
- Occupations: Musician, composer, bandleader
- Instrument: Piano
- Years active: 1924–early 1960s
- Spouse: Wilma Curbelo

Norberto "Noro" Morales (San Juan, Puerto Rico:January 4, 1911 – New York: January 15, 1964) was a Puerto Rican pianist and bandleader.

== Biography ==
Norberto “Noro” Morales was born in the subbarrio Puerta de Tierra of San Juan, Puerto Rico to father Luis Morales Barada, a musician, and mother Mercedes Sanabia, a tailor. Growing up in a musical family, Morales learned multiple instruments as a child, including the trombone, bass, and the piano. He played in Venezuela from 1924 to 1930, then returned to Puerto Rico to play with Rafael Muñoz. He emigrated to New York City in 1935, and played there with Alberto Socarras and Augusto Cohen. In 1939, he and brothers Humberto and Esy put together the Brothers Morales Orchestra. He released the tune "Serenata Ritmica" on Decca Records in 1942, which catapulted him to fame in the Latin music scene, then dominated by rhumba and later by mambo. His band rivaled Machito's in popularity in New York in the 1940s.

It was during this time that his orchestra played for the Havana Madrid nightclub. His lush 1952 Mambo with Noro 10" album is a landmark in conjunto Latin music, a classic mambo album that was part of the 1950s mambo craze, showing the influence of Puerto Rico in the new style.

In 1960 Morales returned to Puerto Rico and played locally; he also worked with Tito Rodríguez, José Luis Moneró, Chano Pozo, Willie Rosario and Tito Puente. Among the musicians who played in Morales' orchestra were Ray Santos, Jorge López, Rafí Carrero, Juancito Torres, Pin Madera, Ralph Kemp, Pepito Morales, Carlos Medina, Lidio Fuentes, Simón Madera, Ana Carrero, Pellin Rodriguez, and Avilés.

The height of his fame and record production was his production of rumba records with his sextet, done after he gave up the big band idea. His use of the piano as both melody and rhythm was highly innovative at the time. "Linda Mujer", "Campanitas de Cristal", "Perfume de Gardenias", "Me Pica La Lengua" and "Silencio", all songs composed by others, were four of his big successes in this line.

== Death ==
Like his brothers, Morales suffered from diabetes and, by the early 1960s, he was severely obese and nearly blind. He died of uremia on January 15, 1964, at Hospital San Jorge, in San Juan, aged 53. He was buried in Puerto Rico Memorial (also known as Cementerio Fournier) in Carolina, Puerto Rico.
