= La chismosa del solar =

"La chismosa del solar" is a guaguancó written by Miguel Sarría and first recorded by Los Muñequitos de Matanzas in 1970. The song was covered in 1975 by Alfredo "Chocolate" Armenteros ("Nicolasa") and Sonora Ponceña ("Tiene pimienta") and released on LP and single format by both artists. A standard of the rumba repertoire, the song was reworked by Lázaro Rizo, a member of Pancho Quinto's group, as "Lenguasá", also known as "Tremendo chuchuchú", which was covered by Orquesta Revé on their successful 1991 album Mi salsa tiene sandunga. The song was later recorded by Pancho Quinto, featuring Omar Sosa on piano, and it has since been covered by other rumba ensembles such as Grupo Mezcla and Rumberos de Cuba.

The song's satirical lyrics deal with gossip and social behaviors in a similar way to "Hipocresía y falsedad" by Ray Barretto, also released in 1970, as well as the poetry of Nicolás Guillén.

== First recordings ==
The earliest recording of "La chismosa del solar" was made by Los Muñequitos de Matanzas in 1970 for Areito, the main imprint of EGREM, Cuba's national record label. It was one of a series of songs released in the early 1970s by the band, effectively relaunching their career after their many recordings in the 1950s under the name Conjunto Guaguancó Matancero. The band had become Cuba's foremost rumba band, partly due to the success of hits like "Los muñequitos", which led to the renaming of the band. Despite not touring internationally at the time, the song made its way to the United States, where trumpeter Alfredo "Chocolate" Armenteros soon recorded and released the song as a single for Mericana Records. He titled the track "Nicolasa", which is the main character the song is about. It was included in his 1975 album Chocolate caliente: Bien sabroso! without any credit except for Oscar Hernández, who arranged the track as an upbeat son. In his monograph about Armenteros, Charley Gerard highlighted his "outstanding solos" on the track.

Also in 1975, the song became the "hit title track" of Sonora Ponceña's album Tiene pimienta, released by Inca records. This salsa version of "La chismosa del solar", produced by Larry Harlow and featuring Luigi Texidor on lead vocals, became one of the band's most successful songs, but it gave no credit to the song's author, like in Armentero's case. The single's B-side was the guaracha "La fiesta no es para feos", which was correctly credited to Walfrido Guevara.

== Lenguasá ==
Rumba singer and percussionist Lázaro Rizo Cuevas wrote a new version of the song with the title "Lenguasá" (instead of the previous main character, Nicolasa). This version had new lyrics and melody and was first recorded by Orquesta Revé in 1991 in a timba arrangement. This recording was titled "Tremendo chu chu chu" and included in their successful album Mi salsa tiene sandunga. In 1997, the song was included as the opener of Pancho Quinto's critically acclaimed debut album "En el solar la cueva del humo". Quinto's rendition has been described as "a rousing rumba that gets a little added muscle from the piano of Omar Sosa, Rahsaan Frederick's bass and the tres of the album's producer, Greg Landau". Quinto's rumba arrangement has been covered by Grupo Mezcla in their 2001 album Las puertas están abiertas (JM Music) and Rumberos de Cuba in their 2018 album Descargando una rumba (EGREM), the latter as "Tremendo chuchuchú".
