= Carabalí =

Carabalí is an Afro-Colombian surname. It originates from the Kalabari people of Nigeria. It also exists in other countries due to the Colombian diaspora. Notable people with the surname include:

- Adriana Carabalí, Colombian politician
- Francisco Carabalí (born 1991), Venezuelan footballer
- Héctor Carabalí (born 1972), Ecuadorian footballer and manager
- José Carabalí (athlete) (born 1970), Venezuelan runner
- José Carabalí (footballer) (born 1997), Ecuadorian football player
- Norfalia Carabalí (born 1964), Colombian sprinter
- Wilson Carabalí (born 1972), Ecuadorian footballer
