= Romance Tropical =

1934 Puerto Rican film

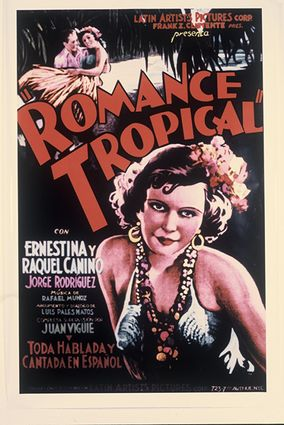
Poster

Romance Tropical is a 1934 Puerto Rican film photographed, directed and produced by Puerto Rican film pioneer, Juan Emilio Viguié. Romance Tropical was first-ever Puerto Rican film with sound and the second feature length Spanish-language film with sound in the world.

== Cast ==
The cast of actors included Jorge Rodríguez, Raquel and Ernestina Canino (daughters of the film's main investor Manuel Canino), Sixto Chevremont, Cándido de Lorenzo and Lotty Tischer.

== Development ==
The film was written by illustrious poet Luis Palés Matos, and scored by renowned band-leader Rafael Muñoz. The wardrobe design was done by Viguié's wife, María.

== Restoration ==
For years many people attempted to locate the lost film, and it seemed that the film relegated to a few photos, a poster and newspaper articles from its initial release.

It was not until 2017, more than eight decades after its release, that a copy of the film was finally found at the UCLA Film and Television Archive, where its director Jan-Cristopher Horak, in conjunction with the Institute of Puerto Rican Culture, confirmed its authenticity.

After an extensive restoration of the copy, the film had its big screen premiere for the first time in 83 years on November 4, 2017 at the Billy Wilder Theater in Los Angeles as part of UCLA Film and Television Archive's ongoing exhibition Recuerdos de un cine en español: Latin American Cinema in Los Angeles, 1930-1960. In its home Puerto Rico, the film's big screen premiere was organized and presented on September 24, 2020 by Viguié's own descendants who today carry the family's film legacy; his grandson, John E. Viguié III, and his great-grandchildren Michelle, Stephanie and Jon-Emile Viguié (collectively known as TheRaccoonteurs.com). The private screening took place at CinemaBar 1950s in Old San Juan.

== See also ==
- Cinema of Puerto Rico
- List of Puerto Ricans
