= Puerto Rico All Stars =

Salsa and Latin Jazz band

The Puerto Rico All Stars were a salsa and Latin Jazz band founded in 1977 by Frankie Gregory. Based in Puerto Rico, the All-Stars were an alternative and rival to the Fania All-Stars created by Jerry Masucci. From 1977–1979, the Puerto Rico All Stars issued three albums. A fourth was released in 1996.

== Band members ==
- Listed in alphabetical order:

1977 Puerto Rico All Stars

- Aldo Torres (Trombone)
- Andy Montañez (Background vocals)
- Andy Montañez (Vocals)
- Augie Antomattei (Trumpet)
- Derek Cartagena (Compilation)
- Eladio Perez (Conga)
- Elias Lopes (Arranger)
- Elias Lopes (Trumpet)
- Elliot Romero (Background vocals)
- Endel Dueno (Timbales)
- Frankie Gregory (Producer)
- Gunda Merced (Arranger)
- Manolito Gonzalez (Bongo)

1978 Puerto Rico All Stars

- Andy Montañez (Vocals)
- Domingo Santos (Timbales)
- Elias Lopes (Trumpet)
- Gunda Merced (Trombone)
- Juan Antonio Pepin (Conga)
- Juancito Torres(Background vocals)
- Juancito Torres(Producer)
- Juancito Torres (Trumpet)
- Juancito Torres (Vocals)
- Lalo Rodríguez (Vocals)
- Luigi Texidor (Vocals)
- Luty Maldonado (Trombone)
- Manolito Gonzalez (Bongo)
- Mario Ortiz (Assistant Producer)
- Mario Ortiz (Trumpet)
- Mario Roman (Piano)
- Papo Clemente (Conga)
- Paquito Guzmán (Background vocals)
- Pepe Guerrero (Marimba)
- Puerto Rico All Stars (Main Performer)
- Raffi Torres (Trombone)
- Ralph Cartagena (Producer)
- Tito Allen (Vocals)
- Tito Lara (Background vocals)
- Tommy Acevedo (Guitar)
- Tommy Villarini (Trumpet)
- Tony Sanchez (Drums)
- Wison Torres Jr. (Background vocals)
- Yayo el Indio (Vocals)

1979 Puerto Rico All Stars

- Andy Montañez (Vocals)
- Frankie Gregory (Producer)
- Gilberto Santa Rosa (Vocals)
- Jorge Millet (Arranger)
- Lalo Rodríguez (Vocals)
- Papo Sanchez (Vocals)
- Puerto Rico All Stars (Main Performer)
- Sammy Gonzalez (Vocals)
- Tito Allen (Vocals)

1996 Puerto Rico All Stars

- Andy Montanez (Performer)
- Andy Montanez (Vocals)
- Angel Machado (Trumpet)
- Angel Torres (Saxophone)
- Celso Clemente (Bongos)
- Cheguito Encarnacion (Saxophone)
- Cuco Sandova (Photography)
- Cusi Castillo (Trumpet)
- Damaris Mercado (Art Direction)
- Darvel Garcia (Background vocals)
- Darvel Garcia (Performer)
- Darvel Garcia (Vocals)
- Edwin Mulenze (Bass)
- Efrain Hernandez (Bass)
- Ernesto Sanchez (Saxophone)
- Frankie Gregory (Producer)
- Furito Rios (Saxophone)
- Hector Tricoche (Performer)
- Hector Tricoche (Vocals)
- Hector Veneros (Saxophone)
- Jerry Medina (Background vocals)
- Josue Rosado (Background vocals)
- Josue Rosado (Performer)
- Josue Rosado (Vocals)
- Juan "Pericles" Covas (Engineer)
- Juancito Torres (Trumpet)
- Julito Alvarado (Arranger)
- Julito Alvarado (Trumpet)
- Lenny Prieto (Arranger)
- Lito Pena (Arranger)
- Liza Montanez (Performer)
- Liza Montanez (Vocals)
- Louis Garcia (Arranger)
- Louis Garcia (Director)
- Louis Garcia (Vocals)
- Luis Aquino (Trumpet)
- Luis Quevedo (Piano)
- Mario Ortiz (Arranger)
- Mario Ortiz (Trumpet)
- Omar Santiago Macaya (Design)
- Phil Austin (Mastering)
- Piro Rodriguez (Trumpet)
- Primi Cruz (Performer)
- Primi Cruz (Vocals)
- Puerto Rico All Stars (Main Performer)
- Rafael "Tito" DeGracia (Timbales)
- Ralph Mercado (Executive Producer)
- Ray Santos (Arranger)
- Roberto Jimenez (Saxophone)
- Ronald Davidson (Design)
- Tommy Villarini (Trumpet)
- Víctor Manuelle (Performer)
- Victor Manuelle (Vocals)
- Willie Lopez (Conga)

2011 Puerto Rico All Stars

- Gunda Merced (Trombone)
- Jesus Sanchez (Engineer)
- Jon Fausty (Engineer)
- Jon Fausty (Mixing)
- Jorge Millet (Arranger)
- Juancito Torres (Trumpet)
- Julio Anidez (Engineer)
- Luigi Texidor (Background vocals)
- Luigi Texidor (Vocals)
- Mario Ortiz (Arranger)
- Mario Ortiz (Trumpet)
- Marvin Santiago (Background vocals)
- Marvin Santiago (Vocals)
- Papo Lucca (Arranger)
- Papo Lucca (Piano)
- Paquito Guzman (Background vocals)
- Paquito Guzman (Vocals)
- Polito Huertas (Bass)
- Puerto Rico All Stars (Main Performer)
- Rafael Ithier (Arranger)
- Raffi Torres (Trombone)
- Ralph Cartagena (Producer)
- Tony Sanchez (Drums)

== Discography ==
- Puerto Rico All Stars: 1977; Re-release: August 10, 1992; Combo Records
- Los Profesionales: 1978; Re-release: August 10, 1992; Combo
- Tribute to the Messiah: 1979; Re-release: September 21, 1993; Combo
- De Regreso: March 5, 1996; Universal/RMM

== References and external links ==
- Puerto Rico All Stars on Myspace
- Article: Rivalries in Latin Music (In Español)
- Discography for Puerto Rico All Stars at AllMusic. Retrieved 2012-04-17.
