= Juan Emilio Viguié Jr. =

Puerto Rican producer

Juan Emilio Viguié, Jr.
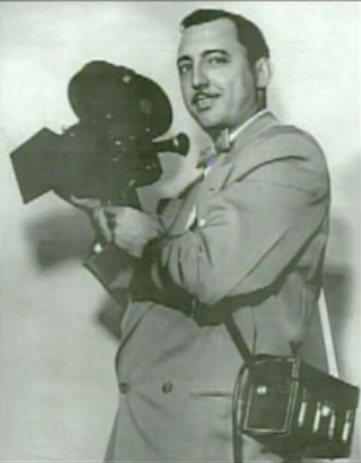
- Born: Juan Emilio Viguié Rodríguez; April 4, 1923; Ponce, Puerto Rico
- Died: 2004 (aged 80–81); San Juan, Puerto Rico
- Occupations: Film and documentary producer
- Spouse: Dolores Fernández
- Children: Juan Emilio “John” Viguié III, Maria Ivonne "Maruja" Viguié
- Parent(s): Juan Emilio Viguié Cajas, María Viguié
- Writing career
- Notable work: El Noticiero Viguié

Juan Emilio Viguié, Jr. was a Puerto Rican visual entertainment producer and entrepreneur. Credited with the development of the film industry as an enterprise in Puerto Rico in the early 1950s and continuing his work for over five decades, Viguié, Jr. produced, directed, and photographed short films, documentaries, and television commercials for the local and mainland US markets.

== Early years ==
Born April 4, 1923, in the Island's southern city of Ponce, he was the eldest son of Puerto Rican film pioneer Juan Emilio Viguié Cajas, who among many other accomplishments in the film industry, also produced, directed and photographed “Romance Tropical” (1934), the Island's first full-length feature film with sound and the second Spanish language film with sound in the world.

Since childhood, Juan Viguié Jr. worked closely with his father and learned early on about cinematography and other aspects of the film industry. He also helped his father produce Viguié Telenews, a newsreel shown in theaters across Puerto Rico.

== Career ==
After serving in the United States Army, Viguié Jr received his honorable discharge in 1946. He establishes Puerto Rico Industrial Photography in San Juan and dedicates to advertising and commercial photography.

In 1950, during the Nationalist revolt known as the Jayuya Uprising, Juan borrowed a 35mm Arriflex camera. He rushed to Jayuya, PR, where he filmed the insurgency and the brutal counterattack by the armed forces. He exhibits the footage across the Island's theaters and soon decides to establish his newsreel which he names "El Noticiero Viguié."

The success of his newsreel not only rekindles his love for film but also makes it possible for him to establish the first movie studio on the Island; Viguié Film Productions, Inc., complete with soundproof rooms, 16mm and 35mm film developing laboratories, sound recording facilities, a woodshop for set construction and editing rooms.

He also integrated the first animation studio in Puerto Rico and pioneers the use of animation techniques in his newsreels and TV advertising.

El Noticiero Viguié

Viguié Film Productions, Inc. operated as a training ground for emerging cinematographers in Puerto Rico during its early years, when experienced crew members were scarce. The company later produced El Noticiero Viguié, a weekly newsreel that was s.creened in New York and other U.S cities with significant Hispanic populations. Although Viguié had originally intended to use the studio for feature film production, these plans were postponed following the arrival of television in Puerto Rico in 1954, due to increased workload demands. Viguié Films subsequently began producing a new program that incorporated filmed footage and sound interviews.

Viguié Film Productions also starts producing the vast majority of the television commercials for the emerging advertising industry on the Island. Juan also lands contracts with the central Madison Ave. Ad agencies to produce, direct and photograph numerous commercials in English geared to the US mainland markets. His company soon opens offices in New York City to better attend to his stateside clients.

In 1963, Juan incorporated a second production facility with Roberto and Marino Guastella, two brothers who had recently immigrated from Cuba. The new company is named Viguié-Guastella and has its separate facilities and personnel.

As the companies continued to flourish, in 1971, Telemundo, a local media conglomerate founded by Angel Ramos and owner of WKAQ radio, WKAQ Channel 2 Television, and El Mundo newspaper, made an offer to acquire the organization. Juan sells Viguié Film Productions and Viguié-Guastella to Telemundo, who then changes the name to Creative Films. As part of the contractual transaction, Juan signed a ten-year non-competition agreement preventing him from establishing a new film studio that could compete with Creative Films. When his son John returned from New York in 1975, where he studied cinematography at NYU, Juan started a new enterprise; Viguié Multimedia. The new company produces Epcot-like audio-visual presentations, consisting of projecting significant quantities of simultaneous still images onto huge screens, synchronized to a captivating soundtrack with narrative. The images were beamed to the screens through a vast array of Kodak 35mm slide projectors, sometimes up to more than 30, all controlled and programmed with the analog computers available at the time. Multimedia presentations proved to be an innovative and effective way of storytelling and became extremely popular at a worldwide level. Viguié Multimedia became the first and largest multimedia company on the Island and soon moved into a new 10,000 sq. ft. facility in the heart of Hato Rey, complete with photographic studios, film developing laboratory, two small theaters, sound studio, and camera equipment to produce special visual effects.

With the advent of personal computers in the early 1990s, the company transitioned to digital technology. He started producing interactive CD-ROMs and DVDs, web pages, computer graphics, and digital photography, and compressed videos in the presentations.

== Later years ==
In 1996 Juan E. Viguié Jr. retires and leaves an indelible mark in history as an instrumental element in the development of the film industry in Puerto Rico.

In 2000, his son, John E. Viguié, redirects the company towards film production and changes the name back to Viguié Films. John went on to produce numerous high-end television commercials, along with two full-length feature films in co-production with Spain: “Agua con Sal” (2005) and “La Mala” (2008).
