= Francisco Carabalí =

Venezuelan footballer (born 1991)

Personal information
- Full name: Francisco Javier Carabalí Terán
- Date of birth: 24 February 1991 (age 35)
- Place of birth: El Cenizo, Venezuela
- Height: 1.80 m (5 ft 11 in)
- Position: Right back

Youth career
- –2009: Trujillanos

Senior career*
Years	Team	Apps	(Gls)
2009–2013	Trujillanos	60	(5)
2011–2012	→ Portuguesa (loan)		
2013–2015	Caracas	61	(1)
2016	Mineros de Guayana	23	(2)
2017	Trujillanos	12	(0)
2017	Atlético Socopó	8	(1)
2018–2019	Yaracuyanos		
2019	Patriotas	1	(0)
2020	Trujillanos	4	(0)
2021–2023	Mineros de Guayana	40	(12)

International career^{‡}
2012–	Venezuela	6	(0)
- * Club domestic league appearances and goals as of 15:59, 19 July 2020 (UTC) ‡ National team caps and goals as of January 19, 2016

Francisco Carabalí (born 24 February 1991) is a Venezuelan footballer as a right back.
