= José Luis Moneró =

- Born: April 6, 1921; Juncos, Puerto Rico
- Died: February 15, 2011 (aged 89); Caguas, Puerto Rico
- Occupation: musician

José Luis Moneró (April 6, 1921 – February 15, 2011) was a Puerto Rican musician and bandleader.

== Music career ==
Moneró first sang at the Tapia Theater at the age of 17. He then went on to Condado Vanderbilt Hotel. Later, his name began to gain popularity with bands like Luis Morales, La Tropicana and Pepito Torres and his unforgettable Siboney.

Like many of his contemporaries in the 1940s, Moneró migrated north to settle in New York City. There he took trumpet lessons with Charles Colin. He played and sang with Noro Morales and José Curbelo. Later he was recruited by Xavier Cugat to sing with his Orchestra.

In the 1980s the singer Julio Angel recruited him to share star in two recording projects of excellence: "50 años de nostalgia" and "Evocando el Ayer". Subsequently, the label disk Hit son released you a compact print live in which, under the production of Salvador Rosa, he shared star with Lucy Fabery, Ruth Fernández, Los Montemar, Tato Díaz and German Dayivet, among others. It documents the concert "Tributo a José Luis Moneró" that produced by Carmen Junco and Edna Rivera appeared in the Center of fine arts of Santurce on 5 September 2002.

Moneró was the father of four and was married for twenty years to the former Tere Haddock and was 89 at the time of his death on February 15, 2011, in an elderly home, in Caguas, Puerto Rico.

His prominence led Governor Luis Fortuño to order flags flown at half staff for three days when informed of the musician's death.

== Sources ==
- Music of Puerto Rico – Biography
- El Nuevo Dia – Obituary
