= Los Muñequitos de Matanzas =

Cuban rumba ensemble

Los Muñequitos de Matanzas is a Cuban rumba ensemble from the city of Matanzas. The group was established in 1952 as Conjunto Guaguancó Matancero and released their first LP in 1956 through Puchito. Since then, Los Muñequitos have continued to perform and record, becoming one of the most successful and critically acclaimed rumba groups of all time.

== History ==
On October 9, 1952 in the barrio of La Marina, city of Matanzas, Cuba, a group of young rumberos stopped off at their local tavern El Gallo after work. While unwinding over drinks, a song by Arsenio Rodríguez came on the bar’s record player. The drummers began accompanying the song by playing on the counter, on glasses and bottles, using whatever items were at hand. Their performance so impressed the other customers, as well as passers-by, that the men received applause when the song and their accompaniment concluded. It was at that moment when one of the men suggested they form a rumba group to perform at local venues. It was agreed and the rumberos walked over to the house of singer and composer Florencio Calle "Catalino" to enlist his help. After hearing the men’s proposition Catalino told them to return the next day to discuss the matter.

At the meeting the following day, Grupo Guaguancó Matancero was formed. The men agreed that the group would perform rumba and each member would be responsible for bringing his own respective instrument. The original members of Guaguancó Matancero were Florencio Calle "Catalino" (director, guagua), Esteban Lantri "Saldiguera" (vocalist), Juan Bosco (vocalist, claves), Hortensio Alfonso "Virulilla" (vocalist, maraca), Gregorio Díaz "Goyo" (tumba or salidor), Pablo Mesa "Papi" (segundo or tres dos) and Angel Pellado "Pelladito" (quinto). Later that year the great batalero (‘batá drummer’) and quintero (‘quinto drummer’) Esteban Vega "Chachá" joined the group.

Although the members were all genuine "street" rumberos, they began performing on stage from the group’s inception. Saldiguera and Virulilla who had sung in son septetos (‘septets’), brought that genre’s style of harmony singing to the group. The percussion was of a very high quality, with the drums carrying on "conversations" of unprecedented inventiveness and virtuosity. The drums were tuned much lower back then, sounding like funky bass lines, with the rhythmically elusive singing "floating" on top. Initially, the group only performed guaguancó, but in ensuing years they interpreted yambú, columbia and abakuá as well.

Guaguancó Matancero began playing in the barrios of Simpson and La Marina, but soon they performed throughout the province of Matanzas. In 1953 they were invited to play at various venues in the capital city, Havana. The group also performed live on radio and television and recorded their first 78 rpm phonorecord for Puchito Records (n. 298). The two songs were "Los beodos" (‘The Drunks’) on Side A, and "Los muñequitos" (‘The Newspaper Comic Strip Characters’) on the B side. "Los muñequitos" became such a big hit that wherever the group played, the people would call out "¡Los muñequitos! ¡Los muñequitos!" The popularity of the song eventually led them to change the name of the group to Los Muñequitos de Matanzas.

In 1958 Panart Records released two phonorecords Guaguancó v. 1 and v. 2, compiling several 78 sides made earlier by the group as well as songs recorded by the Havana rumba group Papín y sus Rumberos. In 1964 Chachá left and vocalist Frank Osamendi joined. Los Muñequitos disbanded in the early 1960s, but re-formed by the end of the decade. They cemented their position as one of Cuba's leading rumba ensembles with songs like "Óyelos de nuevo" and "La chismosa del solar", released in the early 1970s by EGREM. By the 1980s Los Muñequitos were widely known by rumba aficionados in and outside of Cuba. Los Muñequitos quintero Jesús Alfonso's guaguancó "Congo yambumba" (1984) was recorded by Eddie Palmieri (1987), and Grupo Vocal Sampling (1992).

In 1992 the American record company Qbadisc began releasing albums by Los Muñequitos on CD in the United States, followed by a tour of the country for the first time. It was during this time that the group branched out and performed folkloric music and dance besides rumba, such as Lucumí, Palo, abakuá and conga. The music of Los Muñequitos directly reflects the syncretism that exists in Cuba as sacred songs to the orishas often coexist with more secular themes and adaptations of Spanish songs in a single record or performance. In the late summer of 1994 Los Muñequitos joined the Cuban jazz ensemble Irakere on stage at the Banff Centre for the Arts to perform "Xiomara." In 1997, they released their critically acclaimed Live in New York album. Los Muñequitos earned a Grammy Award nomination in 2001. Their latest album, Maferefún la rumba, was released in November 2018.

== Personnel ==
Other past and present members of the group include (in alphabetical order): Iván Alfonso, Freddy Jesús Alfonso Borges, Israel Berriel González, Israel Berriel Jiménez "Toto," Luis Cancino, Baldomero Ricardo Cané Gómez, Pedrito Currubia, Agustín Díaz Cano, Eddy Espinosa, Victoriano Espinosa "Titi," Ronald González, Reyniel López González, José Andro Mella, Rafael Navarro Pujada "Niño," Luis Deyvis Oduardo Ramos, Jaime Oña Ramos, Facundo Pelladito, Ana Pérez Herrera, Yuniscleyvis Ramos, Bárbaro Ramos Aldazábal, Diosdado Enier Ramos Aldazábal "Figurín," Esther Yamile Ramos Aldazábal, Vivian Ramos Aldazábal, Diosdado Ramos Cruz, Alberto Romero Díaz, Ernesto Torriente "Chambelona," Leonel Torriente, and Ricardo Yorca "Chacho."

== Guaguancó innovators ==
=== Salidor and segundo ===
From their very first recordings in 1956, to present, Los Muñequitos have maintained a reputation as innovators of rumba, and of guaguancó in particular. The melodic conversations of the two, lower-pitched congas (salidor and segundo), eventually evolved into an extremely fluid style, that was more an approach than a composite of specific parts. The inventions of Los Muñequitos predates guarapachangeo and similar rumba creations emerging from in and around Havana in the late 1980s. In the late 1980s Los Muñequitos began incorporating break-downs, where the bottom end of the drum melody momentarily dropped out. See: break-down at 3: 28, " La polemica" live in Puerto Cárdenas, Matanzas, 25 April 1987. These breakdowns are similar to the breakdowns heard in the timba music that was emerging at the end of the 1980s, and which continue to this day.

=== Quinto ===
Los Muñequitos' style of playing quinto is also renown. They pioneered the style of an alternating tone-slap melody, that inverts with each cycle of clave (written as a single measure here). The following example shows the sparsest form of the alternating melody. The first measure is tone-slap-tone, and the second measure is slap-tone-slap.

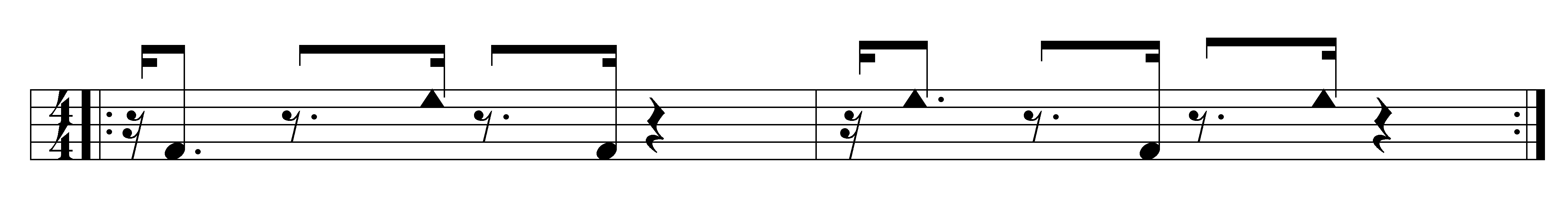
Los Muñequitos-style alternating tone-slap quinto melody.

The following nine-measure excerpt is from the quinto performance on "La polémica," composed by Israel Berriel González. The quinto moves between three different modes (A, B, C). The previous quinto example, and the last measure of the following example are both in the basic mode (A), commonly called the quinto lock, or ride in North America.

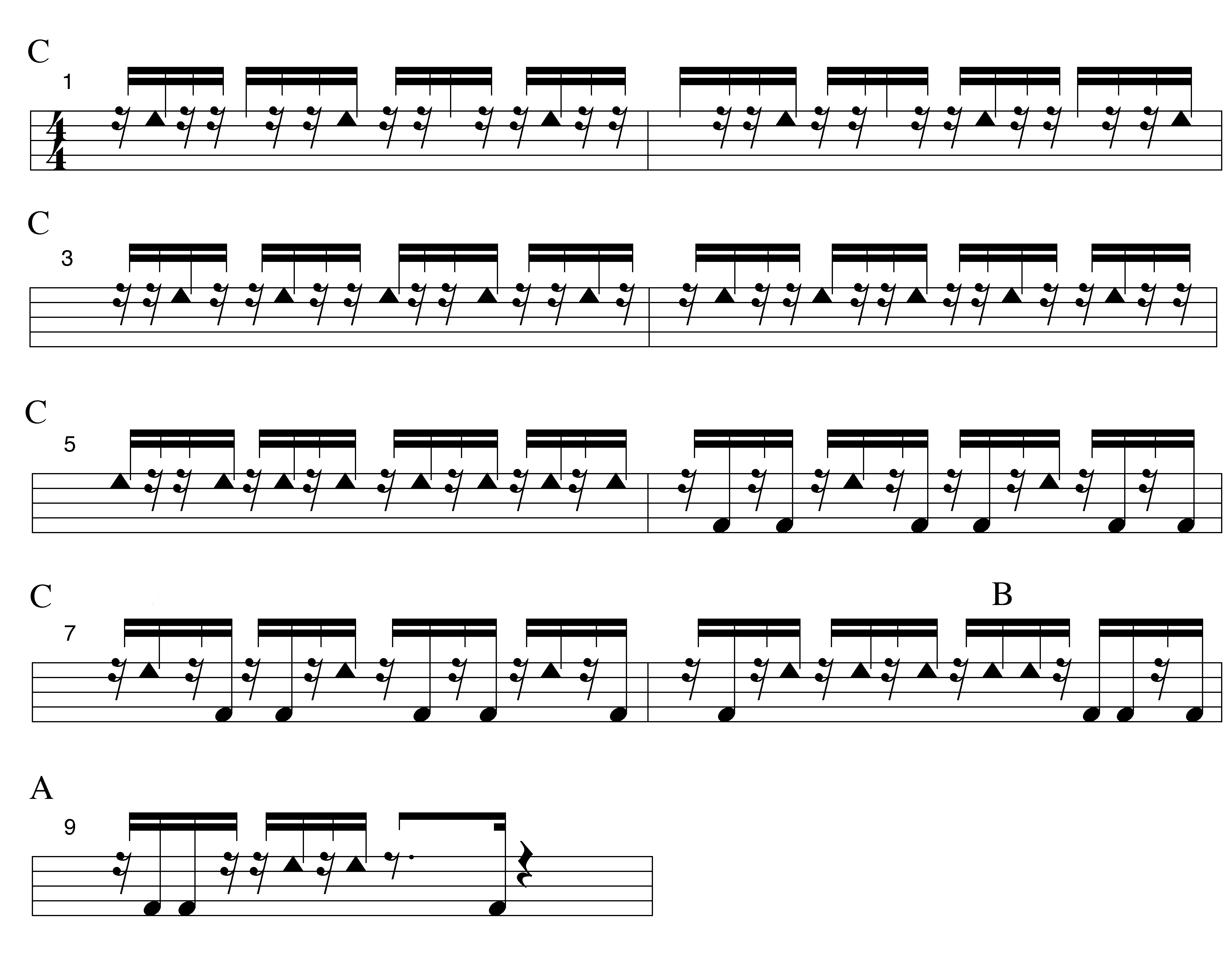
All modes of quinto in context. Quinto excerpt from "La polémica" by Los Muñequitos de Matanzas (1988).

== Selected discography ==
- Guaguancó (Puchito, 1956) - as Conjunto Guaguancó Matancero
- Rumba abierta (F.M.R., 1958 [unreleased]; WS Latino, 1999)
- Cantar maravilloso - Rumba Original (Globestyle, 1990)
- Rumba caliente 88/77 (Qbadisc, 1992)
- Guaguancó — Vol. 2 (Antilla, reissued 1993)
- Congo Yambumba (Qbadisc, 1994)
- Óyelos de nuevo (Qbadisc, 1994)
- Vacunao (Qbadisc, 1995)
- Ito Iban Echu: Yoruba Sacred Music of Cuba (Qbadisc, 1996)
- Live in New York (Qbadisc, 1998)
- Rumba de corazón (Bis, 2002)
- Rumberos de corazón - 50 Aniversario (Bis, 2003)
- Tambor de fuego (Bis, 2007)
- De palo pa' rumba (Bis, 2009)
- Maferefún la rumba (Bis, 2019)
- La Bandera de Mi Tierra (Bis, 2019)
