= Lebrón Brothers =

American band

The Lebrón Brothers or Hermanos Lebrón
- Also known as: Lebron Bros or Los Hermanos Lebrón
- Origin: Aguadilla, Puerto Rico
- Genres: Salsa; Boogaloo; Mambo; Cha cha Son montuno
- Years active: 1965–present
- Members: José Lebrón; Ángel Lebrón; Carlos Lebrón; Frankie Lebrón
- Past members: Pablo Lebrón

The Lebrón Brothers are a musical family born in Puerto Rico and raised in Brooklyn, New York. The brothers are Pablo, José, Ángel, Carlos and Frank. They provide the vocals and rhythm section of the band. Members of the original band were Gabe Gil - alto sax, Tito Ocasio - timbales, Héctor Lebrón - congas, Eddie DeCupe - trumpet, Eliot Rivera - vocals, Félix Rivera - trumpet. Frankie Lebrón later replaced Frankie Rodríguez who replaced his cousin Héctor Lebrón on congas.

== Biography ==
The brothers were born in Aguadilla, Puerto Rico to Francisco Lebron Feliciano, who was born in Lares, Puerto Rico, and Julia Rosa Sosa, born in Aguada, Puerto Rico but were raised in Brooklyn, New York.

They grew up in a musical environment. The eldest, Pablo, was part of a trio that went by the name of "Las Tres Monedas." Their sister María sang on radio shows in Puerto Rico before the family relocated to the mainland United States. The younger brothers formed their own rhythm and blues band at early ages. They performed in talent shows in Brooklyn.

In 1966, they heard something that interested them over the radio. It was the "Boogaloo". The boogaloo was a mix of Latin rhythms with English lyrics. They were especially influenced by "The Joe Cuba Sextette" - a song called "To Be With You" in particular. José gave up playing guitar and began playing piano. Ángel went from bass guitar to an upright bass. Carlos went from guitar to bongos and cowbell.

Early in 1967, José called Cotique Records, spoke to George Goldner and asked for an audition. The audition was set for the following week. George was impressed with their audition, but there was one problem — they had no original songs. George Goldner said he would return in one week and asked them to have some original songs ready that he could listen to. The brothers got together to see what could be done. Even though José had never composed a song before, he was elected to do the writing. In that one week, he managed to write eight songs. Pablo was asked by his brothers to do one song with them, and he decided to leave his own band “La Sonora Arecibena” and join his brothers. They recorded one week later. The Lebron Brothers' first album, "Psychedelic Goes Latin," was a huge success, and the band would end up recording 16 albums for the Cotique label.

The Lebron Brothers brought their own style to the Latin genre, one that blended Motown soul and Latin rhythms. Their choruses sounded more like soul group choruses.

In 1970, Jose Lebron composed '"Salsa y Control," a song that is credited with helping to give a broad category of Latin music the name "salsa." Up until then the mambo, son montuno, guaracha, guaguancó, cha cha cha, etc. had no genre. "Salsa Y Control" helped give this music the name that is now known and acknowledged worldwide. While this may sound good for salsa, it is not completely correct, the first group to use the name salsa was Cheo Marquetti y los salseros, a Cuban group in the late 1950s but the term salsa was mainly adopted to represent a new combination of sounds and instruments in the late 1960s largely in connection with Fania and where a term was needed to be able to market the new sounds.

In 1982, Pablo Lebrón suffered a stroke and required the use of a wheelchair. On July 13, 2010, Pablo Lebrón died.

The Lebrón Brothers are still active. They tour the world and in recent years have recorded number one songs such as “Si Me Permite”, “Culebra”, “No Me Celes”, and “Complicados”. The Lebrón Brothers won the 2012 award for best International Salsa Band in Cali, Colombia.

== Discography ==
Psychedelic Goes Latin	1967	Cotique 1008
The Brooklyn Bums	1968	Cotique 1015
I Believe	1969	Cotique 1022
Brother	1970	Cotique 1039
Llegamos (We're Here)	1970	Cotique 1042
Salsa y Control	1970	Cotique 1049
Pablo	1971	Cotique 1054
Picadillo a la Criolla	1971	Cotique 1055
El La Union Esta La Fuerza	1972	Cotique 1068
Asunto de Familia	1973	Cotique 1074
4 + 1 = The Lebron Brothers	1974	Cotique 1078
Lo Mejor De Lebron Brothers (compilation)	1975; CD: 1992	Cotique 1080
Distinto y Diferente	1976	Cotique 1088
10th Anniversary	1977	Cotique 1093
The New Horizon	1978	Cotique 1098
La Ley	1980	Cotique 1103
Hot Stuff	1981	Cotique 1105
Criollo	1982	Cotique 1106
Salsa Lebron	1986	Caiman Records 9022
El Boso	1988	El Abuelo Records EAR-100
Loco Por Ti (Cuidala)	1989	Yengo Records 100; Exclusivo 302
Salsa En El Paraíso Con Los Lebron	1990	Astro Son Records 9000
Super Hits (compilation)	1994	Fania/Cotique 1107
Ahora Te Toca A Ti (with Corrine Lebron)	1995	FM Discos 2642
Super Hits, Vol. 2 (compilation)	1995	Fania/Cotique 1108
Lo Mistico	1996	Fania/Cotique 1109
35th Anniversary	2002	Exclusivo 602
Made in Colombia	2004	Exclusivo 204
40th Anniversary, Vol. 1	2007	Exclusivo 1106
40th Anniversary, Vol. 2	2008	Exclusivo 1108
Historia De La Salsa (compilation)	2009	Fania/Emusica/UMG 773 130 472
Que Haces Aqui	2013	Codiscos Records 10913347

Note: the latest releases of the Lebron Brothers have been released as singles, from the city of Cali, Colombia in this order: "SI ME PERMITE", 2007 --- "VERDADERO GUAGUANCO", 2008 --- "COMPLICADOS", 2009 --- "CULEBRA", 2009 --- "NO ME CELES", 2010 --- "QUE HACES AQUI", 2012 (they were later included on the Que Haces Aqui release).

== Members ==
- Jose Lebron - Piano, Vocals, Composition, Arrangement and Choir
- Angel Lebron - Bass, Vocals, Composition, Arrangement
- Carlos Lebron - Bongo, Percussionist, Bell, Vocals, Composition
- Frank Lebron - Conga, Percussionist
- Pablo Lebron - Vocals
