= Lo Mejor (LeBrón Brothers album) =

Compilation album by The Lebrón Brothers
- Released: 1992
- Genre: Latin American
- Length: 45:12
- Label: Faria
- Producer: George Goldner

The Lebrón Brothers chronology
Ahora Te Toca A Ti...	Lo Mejor	Made in Colombia

Lo Mejor is a compilation album by The Lebrón Brothers, released in 1992.

== Track listing ==
All tracks are written by The Lebrón Brothers.

No.	Title	Length
1.	"Que Cosas"	5:53
2.	"Mi Debilidad"	5:59
3.	"Sueño"	3:46
4.	"Saludo a Colombia"	4:41
5.	"Ven y Ves"	3:47
6.	"La Ley"	5:09
7.	"Dulce Patria Mía"	6:22
8.	"Pena y Dolor"	5:33
9.	"Vente Conmigo"	4:10
Total length:		45:12

== Reception ==
- Allmusic:
