= Vocal Sampling =

Cuban a cappella group

Vocal Sampling is an all-male a cappella musical group from Cuba. They are distinctive for their rich a cappella adaptations of traditional Cuban salsa music, son, and Rumba, such as their renditions of "El Cuarto de Tula" and "La Negra Tomasa", vocally imitating the piano, cowbell, conga, bass, and trumpet, used originally in such songs. Their 2002 album Cambio de Tiempo (English: Change of Time) was nominated for 3 Latin Grammy Awards.

The six members of Vocal Sampling, all accomplished instrumentalists and arrangers, met at Havana's Instituto Superior de Arte while studying music. Looking for ways to provide music for ill-equipped house parties inspired to unorthodox solutions and soon the unique sound of Vocal Sampling was created.

== Members ==
- René Baños
- Jorge Chaviano
- Oscar Porro
- Abel Sanabria
- Reinaldo Sanler
- Renato Mora

== Discography ==
- Una Forma Mas (April 1995)
- De Vacaciones (July 1997)
- Live in Berlin (1998)
- Cambio de Tiempo (April 2002)
- Akapelleando (January 2008)
