= Juan Emilio Viguié =

Puerto Rican filmmaker

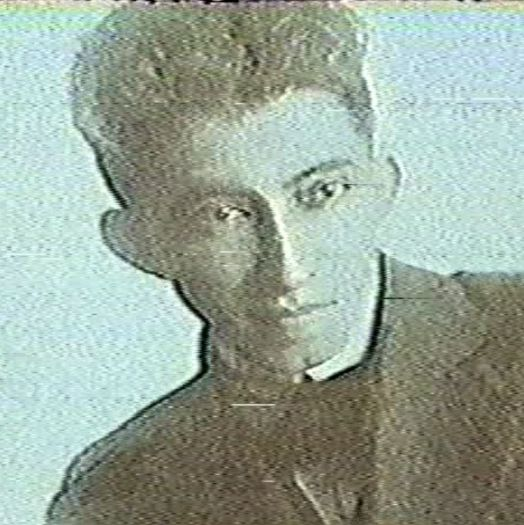
- Pioneer in Puerto Rico's film industry He produced and directed the first Puerto Rican film with sound
- Born: Juan Emilio Viguié Cajas; 11 July 1891; Ponce, Puerto Rico
- Died: September 1966 (aged 75); San Juan, Puerto Rico
- Occupations: Movie and documentary producer
- Children: Juan Emilio Viguié Jr.
- Writing career
- Notable work: Romance Tropical

Juan Emilio Viguié Cajas (July 11, 1891 – September 1966), was a movie and documentary producer. A pioneer in Puerto Rico's film industry, he was the first Puerto Rican to produce commercially successful films in the island. In 1934, he produced and directed Romance Tropical, the first Puerto Rican film with sound.

Viguié produced films for Pathé, Fox Film Corporation, Movietone, and MGM. He also produced many documentaries for the Puerto Rican and U.S. governments, and private industries. His directing career and involvement with the industry continued until the 1950s.

== Early years ==
Viguié's ( birth name: Juan Emilio Viguié Cajas) parents were headed to Panama where his father, a French national, was to work on the construction of the Panama Canal. The couple had to make an emergency stop in Ponce, Puerto Rico, where his mother, a native of Ecuador, gave birth to Viguié. His father continued on his journey, leaving his wife behind. His mother died shortly after giving birth to Viguié. Despite being widespread, reports claiming that his father died while working on the Panama Channel are erroneous, since he was born after a 15-year hiatus (1889 to 1904) of the construction began. Viguié was adopted by a Ponce municipal judge surnamed Caballer. Caballer raised Viguié and sent him to the Miguel Pou Academy in Ponce where he studied visual arts and painting under the guidance of Puerto Rican artist Miguel Pou.

== Viguié's first silent film ==
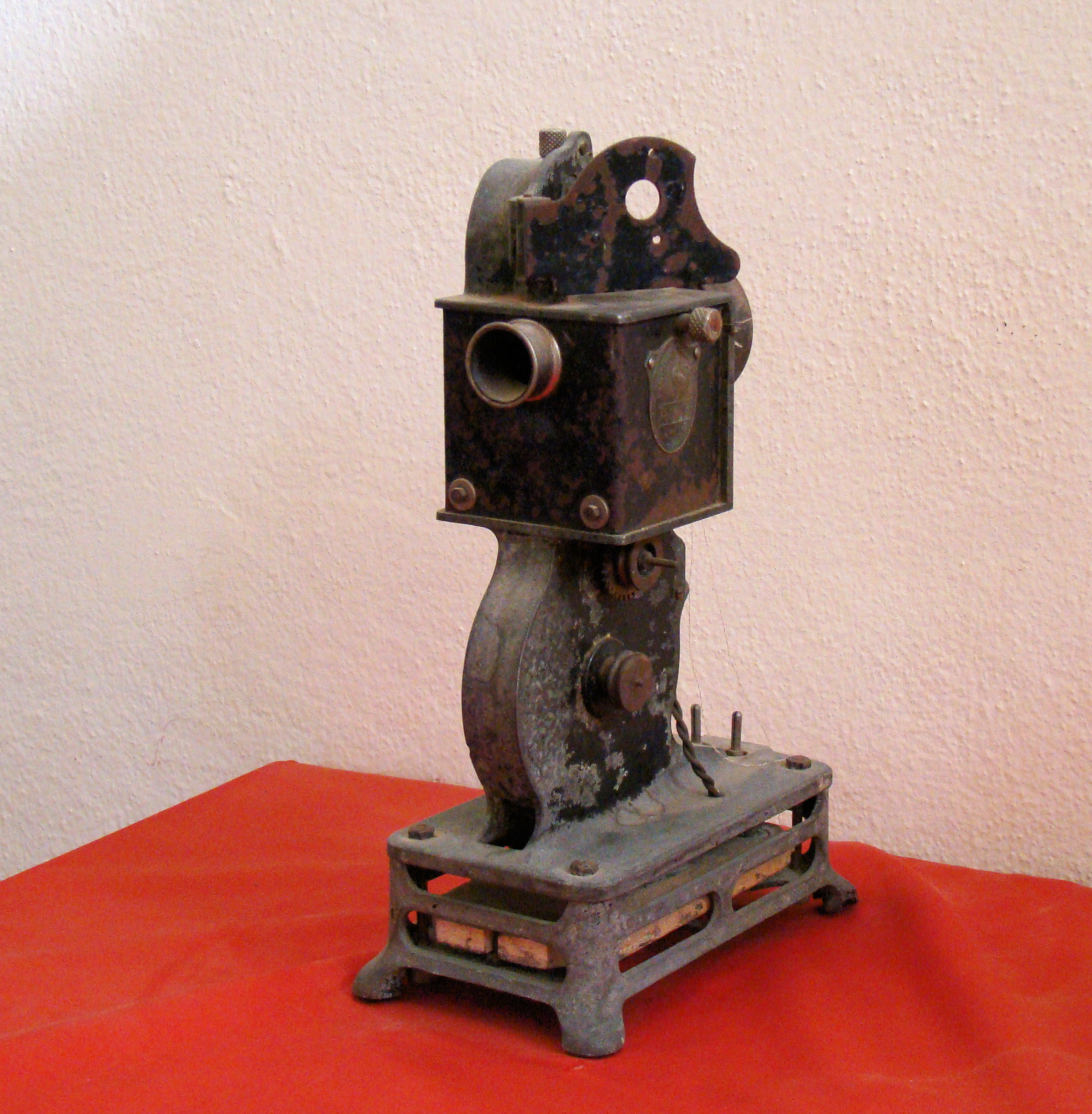
Pathé silent movie projector, probably from the 1920s.

Viguié's interest in the motion picture industry came about in 1901, after viewing the first silent film, an Eduardo Hervet presentation, exhibited in Teatro La Perla in Ponce. During a trip to Paris, France, he witnessed Auguste and Louis Lumière's first public motion picture exhibition at the Caf-Les Capucinos. Upon his return to Puerto Rico he found a job as a movie projectionist at the Teatro Habana in his hometown. Viguié was inspired by what he saw and decided that he would like to make movies himself. In 1911, he sent one of his friends to France to purchase a Pathe camera with the money that he had earned.

The Puerto Rican motion picture industry was born in 1912, when Rafael Colorado D'Assoy recorded the first non-documentary film titled Un Drama en Puerto Rico (A Drama in Puerto Rico). After Viguié's friend returned with the camera, Viguié purchased two movie projectors from a French circus visiting Ponce and established a movie house in the town of Adjuntas. After acquiring a Pathé camera, he recorded the daily life at the municipality and showing them there. Shortly afterwards, he would receive a Bell & Howell camera from Colorado himself. In 1912, Viguié left to study at the New York Institute of Photography and worked with Paramount and Universal. Upon his return, Viguié joined Porto Rico Photoplays. After the company ceased to exist, he acquired the equipment and began filming documentaries.

Viguié filmed his first documentary Escenas de Ponce (Scenes of Ponce) which consisted of various scenes of Ponce. He also included a scene of a hurricane and exhibited his work at Teatro Habana. The public became interested in his work and soon the Teatro Habana and his movie house in Adjuntas became popular public reunion centers. The hurricane scene in his documentary was shown in the United States by the American (U.S.) news media.

== Pioneer in the film industry of Puerto Rico ==
In 1919, Viguié returned to Puerto Rico, and in his native Ponce began work on a film based on the life of Puerto Rican pirate Roberto Cofresi. The film was to be titled El Tesoro de Roberto Cofresi (Roberto Cofresi's Treasure), however the project did not proceed because of the lack of funds.

Viguié then went to work as a cameraman for "Porto Rico Photoplays," a film company established in Hato Rey. Even though the company was financed by local Puerto Rican businessmen, none of its members, with the exception of Viguié, was Puerto Rican or Hispanic. Amongst the main staff of the company were Reginald Denny, Ralph Ince and Ruth Clifford, who were involved in constant quarrels. Viguié also directed a recreation of the Battle of San Juan.

In 1921, the company produced a film for Paramount titled "Tropical Love." The movie was filmed in Loiza and San Juan, but without any participation from, or outreach to, any of the local residents. The film was conceived and executed exclusively by, and for, the U.S. Anglo population. This myopic production philosophy, and the chronic bickering amongst the directors, led to the company's closure.

== Noticieros Viguié (Viguié News) ==
Viguié took advantage of the company's closing and purchased its film equipment. In 1922, he then founded his own company Noticieros Viguié (Viguié News). He collaborated as a cinematographer for various U.S. film companies that went to Puerto Rico to film their movies.

"Viguié News" made a positive impression on the public with a documentary Viguié filmed, regarding the elaboration of tobacco. As a result, he was offered numerous contracts to make documentaries for the Puerto Rico Department of Health, the government of the Dominican Republic and the Rockefeller Foundation. In 1924, Viguié experimented with a new technique called Technicolor which yielded vivid, highly saturated levels of color to his film images. He used this technique in a documentary about the Malaria disease, and it gained him worldwide recognition.

In 1926, Viguié was hired by the producers of the movie Aloma of the South Seas to film the movie scenes in the location of Piñones

Viguié's international fame continued to grow, with his documentaries about Charles Lindbergh's 1928 visit to Puerto Rico, and the devastation caused that year by "Hurricane San Felipe Segundo" (known in the U.S. as "Okeechobee Hurricane") for Fox. Fox News paid him well for the use of both documentaries, Viguié signed contracts with both MGM and Fox News, and both networks served as international outlets for his work.

Synchronized film dialogue became possible in the late 1920s, with the perfection of the audion amplifier tube and the introduction of the Vitaphone system. Thus, the era of the silent movie came to an end. Viguié incorporated the new sound technology into his documentaries, and in the interviews he conducted with political and entertainment celebrities.

== Romance Tropical ==
Romance Tropical was the first Puerto Rican film with sound and the world's second Hispanic film with sound.

In 1931, Viguié together with his son Juan Emilio Viguié, Jr. and journalist Manuel R. Navas, founded "Viguié Film Productions."

That same year, Santa, a Mexican production and the first Spanish movie with sound, was presented in theaters throughout the island. After viewing Santa., Viguié was inspired to make his own movie with sound.

With a loan of $10,000 and a screenplay written by Luis Pales Matos, Viguié produced and directed in 1934, Romance Tropical the first Puerto Rican movie with sound and the second Spanish movie with sound in the world. The movies' theme dealt with the romance between a poor boy and a rich girl. The cast of actors included Jorge Rodríguez, Raquel and Ernestina Canino (daughters of San Juan lawyer and film investor Manuel Canino), Sixto Chevremont, Cándido de Lorenzo and Lotty Tischer. Viguié's wife María was in charge of the wardrobe and the musical score was under the direction of composer Rafael Muñoz.

Romance Tropical, which was distributed in theaters throughout Puerto Rico and New York by MGM, was an astounding success. MGM was ready to sign Viguié with a contract for four more movies and Frank Z. Clemente, MGM's Director of Latin productions, was going to establish his central offices in Puerto Rico. However, a copyright dispute over the movie erupted between the Canino family and Viguié. One of the results of the disputes was that MGM canceled its contracts with Viguié.

During the 1960s, Viguié helped a young Efraín López Neris get a camera, with which he filmed the pilot for La cámara cómica. Disillusioned, Viguié discontinued making commercial films. Instead he directed all his energies to "Viguié News" and continued to make news documentaries. In September 1966, Viguié died in his home in San Juan.

The whereabouts of the original reels of the film is a mystery. Although for years many people sought to locate the missing film, it seemed as if it had met the fate of so many movies from that era, relegated to a few photos, a poster and newspaper articles from its initial release.

However in 2017, eighty-three years after its release, a copy of the film was finally found at the UCLA Film & Television Archive, where its director Jan-Cristopher Horak, in conjunction with the Puerto Rico Culture Institute, confirmed its authenticity.

The restored copy of the film had its big screen premiere for the first time in more than 80 years on November 4, 2017 at the Billy Wilder Theater in Los Angeles as part of UCLA Film and Television Archive’s ongoing exhibition Recuerdos de un cine en español: Latin American Cinema in Los Angeles, 1930-1960.

In its home Puerto Rico, the film's big screen premiere was organized and presented on September 24, 2020 by Viguié's own descendants who have carried on in his filmmaking footsteps - his grandson John E. Viguié III and great-grandchildren Stephanie, Michelle, and Jon-Emile Viguié (collectively known as TheRaccoonteurs.com). The screening took place in private event at CinemaBar 1950s movie theater in Old San Juan.

== Legacy ==
Viguié's film legacy has been carried forward through the generations. By 1951, Viguié Film Productions, presided by his son, Juan Emilio Viguié, Jr. had become the largest film producing company in Puerto Rico. Like his father, upon his retirement Viguié Jr. also left an indelible mark in history as being an instrumental element in the development of the film industry in the island. In turn Viguié Jr.'s son, John E. Viguié III, took charge of Viguié Film Productions after his father retired, redirecting the company more towards film production and changing the name back to Viguié Films. In 2018, along with two of his daughters Michelle Viguié and Stephanie Viguié, and his son Jon-Emile Viguié (Viguié Sr.'s great-grandchildren), together co-founded the entertainment company TheRaccoonteurs.com. The latter make up the third and fourth generations (respectively) of the Viguié lineage in the film industry.

Viguié was also a pioneer in the transmission of news via television. In 1954, television arrived in Puerto Rico. WAPA-TV, together with Telemundo and "WKBM" (Channel 11), was one of the first television stations in Puerto Rico. That same year WAPA-TV began to transmit the news via the airwaves in a Viguié News production called "El Observador" (The Observer) which lasted only 15 minutes. Today, Viguié's historical news documentaries are conserved in the Puerto Rico Archives and in the Carnegie Library.

For his pioneering work in the theatrical arts, he is recognized at Ponce's Parque del Tricentenario. His son donated part of his films to the Archivo Histórico de Puerto Rico, where it is preserved.

== See also ==
- List of Puerto Ricans
- Cinema of Puerto Rico
- List of films set in Puerto Rico

== Bibliography ==
- Jiménez, Juan Ortiz (2007). Nacimiento del cine puertorriqueño: los primeros 40 años de la cinematografía puertorriqueña (in Spanish). Editorial Tiempo Nuevo. ISBN 978-0-9773612-7-4.
- García, Beba (2009). ¡Juan, Juan, Juan!: crónicas de la televisión en los tiempos de don Tommy (in Spanish). Terranova Editores. ISBN 978-1-935163-30-5.
- García, Joaquín 'Kino' (2014). Historia del Cine Puertorrique¤o (in Spanish). Palibrio. ISBN 978-1-4633-8732-7.
