= Seguida =

American rock band

- Also known as: NY Latin Rock
- Origin: Bronx, New York, United States
- Genres: Latin rock
- Years active: 1974–present
- Label: Fania
- Members: STEVE ADORNO - LORI ROSE - LOU PEREZ - WALLY IRIZARRY - CARLOS GO GO GOMEZ - PETE NATER - PITO CASTILLO - GREGORY RAHIIM PRESS - JUAN SEPULVEDA
- Past members: Angel Nater, Chino Morales, Manny Morales, Eddie Moltavo, Randy Ortiz, Tony Cardenea, and Jorge Luis Arce
- Website: http://www.reverbnation.com/seguidanylatinrock

Seguida is a Latin Rock Group from New York., who won the 1976 Latin NY Magazine "Best Latin Rock Album" award.

== Beginnings ==
The original Seguida group was founded by a group of New York musicians whose ancestry was of Puerto Rican heritage. They were brought up in the urban South Bronx barrios where musical influences were a mixed bag. In these barrios, it wasn't unusual to hear the sounds of James Brown and Funkadelic coming from one apartment, while in another hear the sounds of Larry Harlow, Eddie Palmieri and Ray Barretto and still in another apartment you could hear the sounds of the Beatles, Cream, Motown, Jefferson Airplane and Led Zeppelin.

Listening to all of these musical styles mixed together, became a way of life for Seguida. These diverse musical styles and rhythmic influences were embedded into their collective musical consciousness. It was only natural therefore, that when they decided to form a group, the results would be a mix of all the musical influences they had internalized in their formative years.

== Early influence ==
When Carlos Santana's smash hit interpretation of Tito Puente's “Oye Como Va”, was released, it proved to be a driving force for these young New Yorican musicos. They formed two groups, one called "Latin Soul Inc." with Angel Nater, Pete Nater and Eddie Montalvo, and the other called "Devoshun" with Steve Adorno, Lou Perez, Lori Rose and Carlos "Go-Go" Gomez. Both groups played at local high school dances, parties and street fairs. "Devoshun" and "Latin Soul Inc.’s" repertoire included the local AM radio station's hits of the era, with the added twist of integrating Latin Funk standards by Ray Barretto, Joe Bataan and Willie Colon.

This was a very radical approach for the time, because local groups either specialized in playing Soul, Rock or Latin standards. Latin Soul Inc. broke this mold and became a local sensation. Their unique sound caught the ear of a young and upcoming Rock Bassist and arranger named Randy Ortiz, who was looking for a group that could realize his musical ideas of combining the electric power of a rock band with a fiery Latin rhythm section. The concept was taken a step further with the addition of a dual trumpet, dual brass sections that would be reminiscent of the conjunto sound...a style of orchestration which has deep roots in the New York Latin music scene. Under the musical direction of Randy Ortiz, the band leadership of percussionist Angel Nater Jr., and guitarist Louie Perez, Seguida began to refine its sound. The result was a style like no other. The sound grew to be the New York hybrid of Rock and Salsa!

=== Fania recording contract and Salsa TV show ===
The group received much attention and soon became the opening act for Salsa performers including Willie Colon, Larry Harlow, Ray Barretto and Eddie Palmieri. This exposure soon led to a recording contract with the reigning giant of the Salsa industry, Fania Records. Their debut album, "Love Is…Seguida" was released in 1974 and was well received by both the Salsa and Rock media in New York and Puerto Rico. The New York Newspaper "THE VILLAGE VOICE" Called SEGUIDA "THE SON'S OF SANTANA". The album scored a hit with “Mambo Rock”, a scorching mambo that received a great deal of exposure on both Rock and Salsa radio stations. The song became the theme for The Izzy Sanabria "Salsa" TV Show that featured Seguida as its house band. They opened the now legendary "Fania All-Stars" concert at Yankee Stadium, which ended in crowd pandemonium during Ray Barretto's and Mongo Santamaria's infamous conga duel in August 1973.

=== Tour and second album ===
The group then went LIVE IN QUAD from Electric Lady Studios as part of New York radio station WXQR's live concert series. In September 1976, they were featured in the Village Gate's Salsa Meets Jazz series. From there, Seguida took off on a tour of Northeast and was the opening act for Sly and the Family Stone, James Taylor, Richie Havens, Ace, Crown Height Affair and Elephants Memory. In the summer of 1976, Seguida took to the studio again and delivered their second album, "On Our Way To Tomorrow"...Seguida. This album added a number of new musicians to the line-up including Joe Ortiz* (co-founder member of Atlantic Records - Heaven on Earth) was composed during the height of the Disco era and is definitely heard on Side A of the album. Side B however, returned Seguida back to form with an outstanding collection of songs that took Latin Rock to a plateau never before reached. The song “Yo Nunca Te Olvidare” is considered to be groundbreaking in its use of a totally Salsa format with English lyrics at its head, and Spanish vocal soneros by Joe Ortiz during its montuno and solo sections. The song received much international airplay and is considered by many to be the template for many of today's modern Salsa crossovers.

- Joe Ortiz also 'unofficially' arranged some pretty lush background vocal parts for the songs 'On Our Way To Tomorrow', Yo Nunca Te Olvidare', 'I Wanna Stay Next To You' and 'Fields Of Laughter'. His involvement as a vocal arranger on this album remains uncredited!

Fania began to concentrate on their own in-house Latin crossover, The Fania All-Stars. Seguida's response was to create two spin-offs: "Somos”, which was a traditional Salsa group that included Ronnie Amorous along with Angel Nater Jr., and Eddie Montalvo and, "The New York Big Apple All-Stars" which was a hot session group that specialized in recording tracks of popular Disco songs that were translated into Spanish for the Mexican and South American markets. Included here were Seguida's present bandleader Steve Adorno, Randy Ortiz, guitarist Lou Perez and SEGUIDA vocalist Lori Rose. Seguida went into the studio in 1978 and recorded material for their third album. That material was never released, but from all accounts, it was a treat that Seguida fans would have loved.

== The future ==
Seguida is a group of musicians, especially aficionados of Latin music. From their inception in 1972 as Fania Record artists, Seguida has contributed to the diffusion of the genre of Latin Rock. Their East Coast Afro-Cuban-Salsa-Rock sound grew out of the barrios of the Bronx. Included as part of the “Fania All Stars,” Seguida has toured globally spreading their Latin-Rock-Jazz sound as they shared the stage with Latin stars such as Larry Harlow, Eddie Palmieri, Hector LaVoe, Willie Colon. Bandleader/producer/composer/drummer, Steve Adorno has brought a mixture of original and new members together to record a third and fourth record. Produced by Adorno and Jay Henry, "Seguida 3" continues their tradition of using English vocals and Spanish soneros in a hot salsa-soul-rock feel.

== Discography ==
Fania 478 "Love Is" 1974
