= Lo Mejor (Grupo Niche album) =

Compilation album by Grupo Niche
- Released: 1998
- Genre: Latin American

Lo Mejor is a compilation album by Grupo Niche, released in 1998 on Caiman. All songs were written by Jairo Varela.

== Track list ==
- Del Puente Pa'Lla
- La Fiera
- Mama Chila
- Ana Milé
- Listo Medellin
- Interes Cuanto Vales
- Las Flores Tambien Se Mueren
- Cicatrices
