= Rafael Muñoz (musician) =

Puerto Rican musician

- Born: September 5, 1900; Quebradillas, Puerto Rico
- Died: September 2, 1961 (aged 60); Santurce, Puerto Rico
- Occupation: musician

Rafael Muñoz Medina (September 5, 1900 – September 2, 1961) was a Puerto Rican double bassist and big band director. His repertoire consistent mainly of guarachas, congas and boleros. He was a prolific bandleader from 1929 until his retirement in the 1950s. His hits include "Sandunguera", "El hueso de María", "La conga del 39" and "Ojos malvados". The primary lead vocalists of his orchestra were José Luis Moneró, Félix Castrillón and his son Raffi Muñoz. Other singers that performed with his band were Tony Sánchez and Irma Morillo.

== Life and career ==
Born in Quebradillas, Puerto Rico in 1911, Muñoz was chosen to replace Don Rivero as the band leader of the Orquesta del Escambrón Beach Club in 1934, after which it became known as the Rafael Muñoz Orchestra. Its members included among others the pianist Noro Morales and vocalist José Luis Moneró.

Muñoz was the director in charge of the musical score of the film Romance Tropical, the first Puerto Rican movie with sound and the second Spanish movie with sound in the world. It was filmed in 1934. The story of the movie was written by Luis Pales Matos and filmed and produced by Juan Emilio Viguié.

Rafael Muñoz died on September 1, 1961, at age 60. He was buried at the Puerto Rico Memorial Cemetery in Carolina, Puerto Rico.

== Recordings ==
RCA Records released several albums of his material in the 1960s.
