= Willie Rosario =

Puerto Rican musician (born 1924)

- Also known as: "Mr. Afinque"
- Born: Fernando Luis Rosario Marín; April 27, 1924 (age 102); Coamo, Puerto Rico
- Genre: Salsa
- Occupations: Musician, composer and bandleader of salsa music
- Instrument: Timbales

Willie Rosario (born Fernando Luis Rosario Marín; April 27, 1924) is a Puerto Rican musician, composer and bandleader of salsa music. He is also known as Mr. Afinque.

== Early years ==
Fernando Luis Rosario Marín was born into a poor, but hard working family on April 27, 1924, in Coamo, Puerto Rico, where he was also raised. (Note: In this Spanish name, the first or paternal surname is Rosario and the second or maternal family name is Marín.) His parents realized that as a child Willie was musically inclined and had him take guitar lessons at the age of six. He received his primary and secondary education in his hometown. His mother also had him take saxophone classes; however, what he really was interested in was the conga. In 1941, he formed a band called Coamex but, a year later when he was 17 years old, his family moved to New York City, United States. The family rented an apartment in a Manhattan community known as Spanish Harlem.

Rosario came into contact and played the conga for various orchestras. After he graduated from high school, he continued his education and studied journalism and public relations. On one occasion Rosario visited the Palladium Ballroom in New York, where Tito Puente was playing the timbales. This was the beginning of his love affair with that instrument. He was 22 years old when he took classes with percussionist Henry Adler.

== Rosario's first band ==
In 1959, Rosario organized his first band and played for three years in the Club Caborrojeño in New York. When not playing, he worked as a disc jockey for WADO, a Spanish speaking radio station in New York.

In 1962, he signed with the Alegre Records label and traveled and performed with his band in Venezuela, Panama, Colombia, Mexico, Curaçao, U.S. Virgin Islands and all over the United States. In the 1980s he opened the Tropicana Club in Puerto Rico, in association with fellow Puerto Rican musician Bobby Valentín.

== Compositions ==
External audio
- You may listen to Willie Rosario's "Callejero" on YouTube.

Among his best-known compositions and arrangements are "De Barrio Obrero a la Quince" ("De Barrio Obrero a la Quince" was written by Trinidad Clemente), "El Timbal de Carlitos", "Mi Amigo el Payaso" ("My Friend the Clown") with lyrics by Luis Antonio Ruiz, "El Revendón", "Lluvia" ("Rain"), "Cuando No Hay Cariño" ("When There's No Love"). Plus, he also composed the following jazz tunes "Flip, Flop", "Stop and Go" and "My Favorite Thing".

Rosario also produced the following songs with the participation of Gilberto Santa Rosa, Tony Vega, Papo Lucca and Bobby Valentín; "Latin Jazz Go-Go-Go", "El Bravo soy Yo" ("I'm the Tough Guy"), "Too Too Much" and "Willie Rosario y su Ritmo".

== Awards and recognitions ==
Among the awards and recognitions bestowed upon Rosario are a nomination in 1987 for a Grammy Award for his song "Nueva Cosecha" ("New Harvest"), various gold and platinum Records, the Agüeybaná de Oro Award, ACE, Diplo and Paoli Awards. In 2000, the Puerto Rican Senate paid tribute to Rosario in recognition of his 40 years in the field of music. In 2002, he was inducted into The International Latin Music Hall of Fame.

Rosario's last production was "La Banda Que Deleita". He continues to play many venues all around Puerto Rico, including the prestigious Puerto Rican World Salsa Congress and many times at "Dia Nacional de la Salsa" or the National Salsa Day in Puerto Rico. He has also played minor venues, such as Shots Bar & Grill in the Isla Verde Mall in late October 2006. Since his October 2006 performance, Willie Rosario and his band also performed for the Puerto Rican Medical Doctors' Association of El Paso (Texas) Gala in December 2007.

== Discography ==
- El Bravo Soy Yo! (1963)
- Fabuloso y Fantástico (1966)
- Latin Jazz a Go-Go-Go (1967)
- Two Too Much (1967)
- Haida Huo (1968)
- Boogaloo y Guaguancó (1968)
- El Bravo de Siempre (1969)
- De Donde Nace el Ritmo (1971)
- Más Ritmo (1972)
- Infinito (1973)
- Otra Vez (1975)
- Gracias Mundo (1977)
- From the Depth of My Brain (1978)
- El Rey del Ritmo! (1979)
- El de a 20 de Willie (1980)
- The Portrait of a Salsa Man (1981)
- Atízame el Fogón (1982)
- The Salsa Machine (1983)
- Nuevos Horizontes (1984)
- Afincando (1985)
- Nueva Cosecha (1986)
- A Man of Music (1987)
- The Salsa Legend (1988)
- Unique (1989)
- Viva Rosario! (1990)
- The Roaring Fifties (1991)
- Tradición Clásica (1993)
- ¡Sorpresas! (1995)
- Back to the Future (1999)
- La Banda Que Deleita (2006)
- Evidencia (2016)

== See also ==
- List of Puerto Ricans
