= La Sonora Ponceña =

Puerto Rican salsa band, founded in 1954

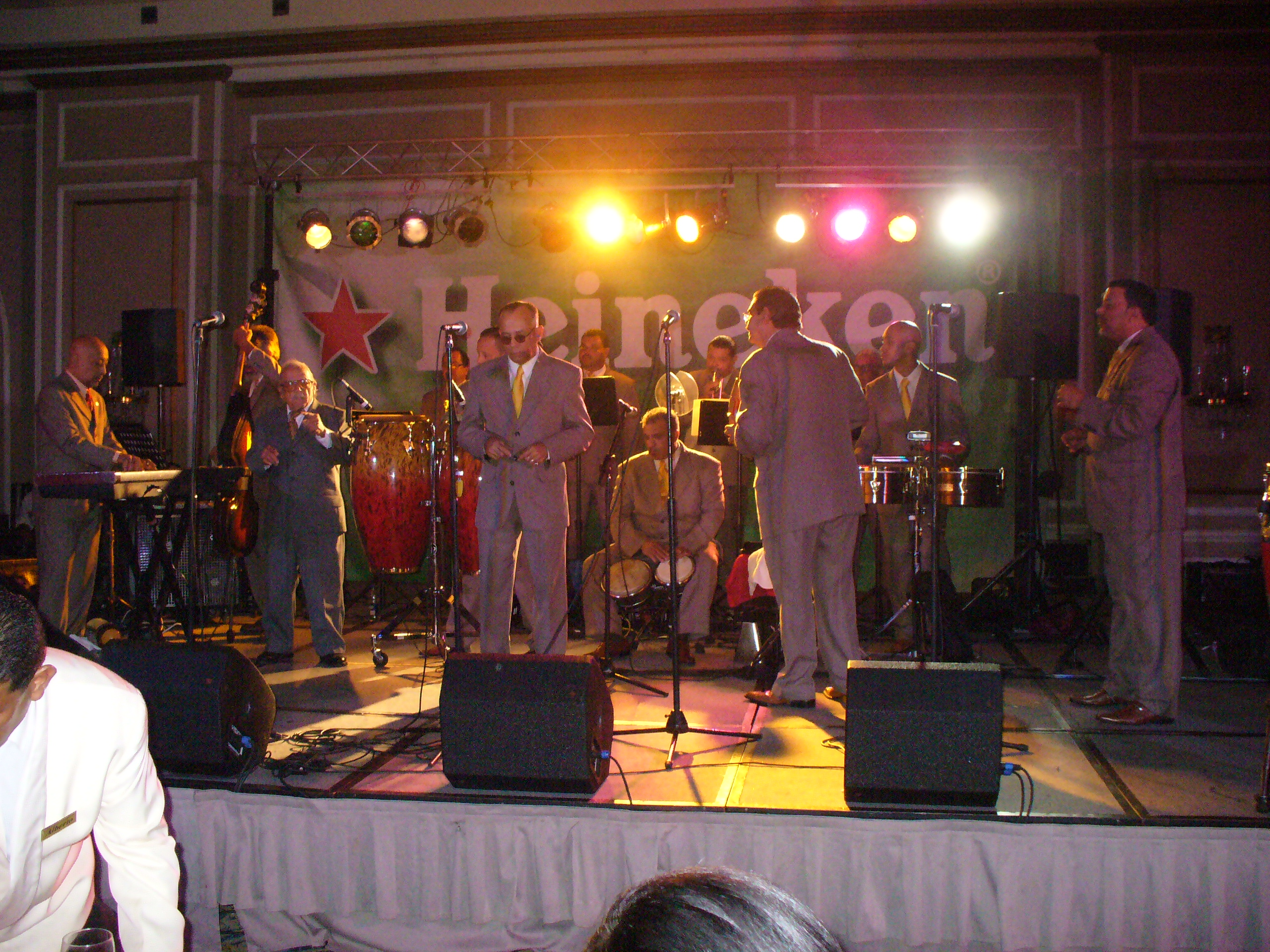
- La Sonora Ponceña

Background information
- Origin: Ponce, Puerto Rico
- Genre: Salsa
- Occupation: Band
- Years active: 1954–present
- Members: Musical Director and Pianist: Papo Lucca Founder and Director: Enrique "Quique" Lucca Caraballo; Singers: Edwin Rosas, Daniel Dávila, Darvel García & Jorge Nicolai; Trumpets: Roberto "Roby" Texeira, Glenn Díaz, Julio Loyola & Davian Berríos; Bass: Alexander Rosa; Conga: Wilfredo López; Bongó: Domingo Gutiérrez Timbal: Japhet Rodríguez
- Past members: Singer: Tito Gómez
- Website: http://www.sonoraponcena.net

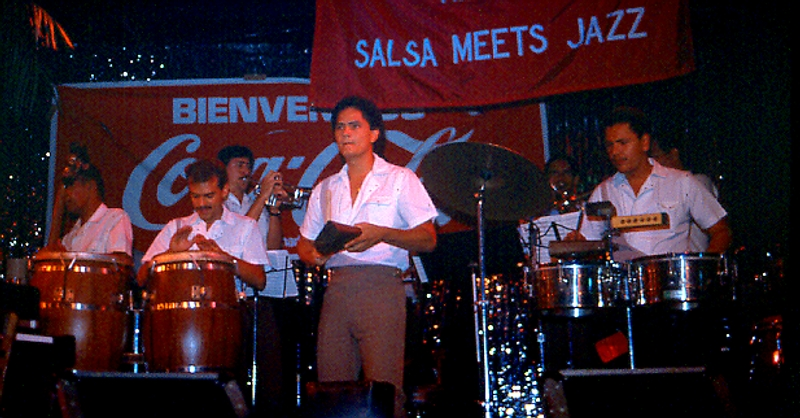
La Sonora Ponceña plays the Village Gate (NYC) in the 1980s.

La Sonora Ponceña is a Puerto Rican salsa band, founded in 1954 by Enrique "Quique" Lucca Caraballo. Today Quique's son, Papo Lucca, directs the band. The band has stayed active for a remarkable amount of time, recording dozens of albums, including a 55th anniversary album. Singers included Tito Gómez.

== History ==
=== Origin ===
The history of La Sonora Ponceña is the history of Quique Lucca (December 12, 1912 – October 9, 2016), who was born in Yauco, Puerto Rico. In 1928, when he was 16 years old, his family moved to Ponce, Puerto Rico and Quique started to work as an auto mechanic and started playing the guitar. In 1932 he met Angélica Quiñones, the future mother of his children, Zulma, Papo and Wanda. In 1944 Quique put together a band called "El Conjunto Internacional", including three instrumentalists: tumbadora, bongó, vocalist Carlos Luis Martínez and Quique Lucca at the guitar and second voice. Later, Antonio 'Tato' Santaella joined, playing the bongó. On 10 April 1946, Enrique Lucca Jr. ("Papo") was born; he would later become the musical director of "La Sonora". In fact, in 1951, Papo surprised his father and the other members of the "Internacional" band when, at only 5 years old, he joined a band practice and started playing the tumbadora on Tito Puente's "Ran Kan Kan".

=== Reorganization ===
After the band had been inactive for a year, Quique re-established it in 1954 and renamed it "Conjunto Sonora Ponceña". His childhood friend Antonio "Tato" Santaella played bajo de cajón. On 20 April of that year the band played at its first official dance. In 1956, Vicentivo Morales, joined the band as its first pianist. Later that year, Quique brought young Papo into the band as a pianist. In November 1957, Papo made its official debut during a dance on the northern shore of the Island. In 1958, La Sonora Ponceña recorded its first 78 RPM with Avelino Muñoz as pianist. The 78 RPM contained No puede Ser on one side and Tan Linda que Era on the reverse side. Towards the end of 1958, the band went into recording mode and included 12-year-old Papo Lucca. The band included its first official vocalist Charlie Martínez. Later on, vocalists Felipe and Davilita would also record bolero-mambo themes such as Noche de Locura. In September 1960, the group played in New York City. The group's main attraction was its 12-year-old pianist, Papo Lucca. In 1968 the group started its official recordings on 33 RPM with the album Hacheros Pa' Un Palo. La Sonora Ponceña recorded exclusively for Inca Records (even after Fania Records bought/merged the label into their own company in 1972).

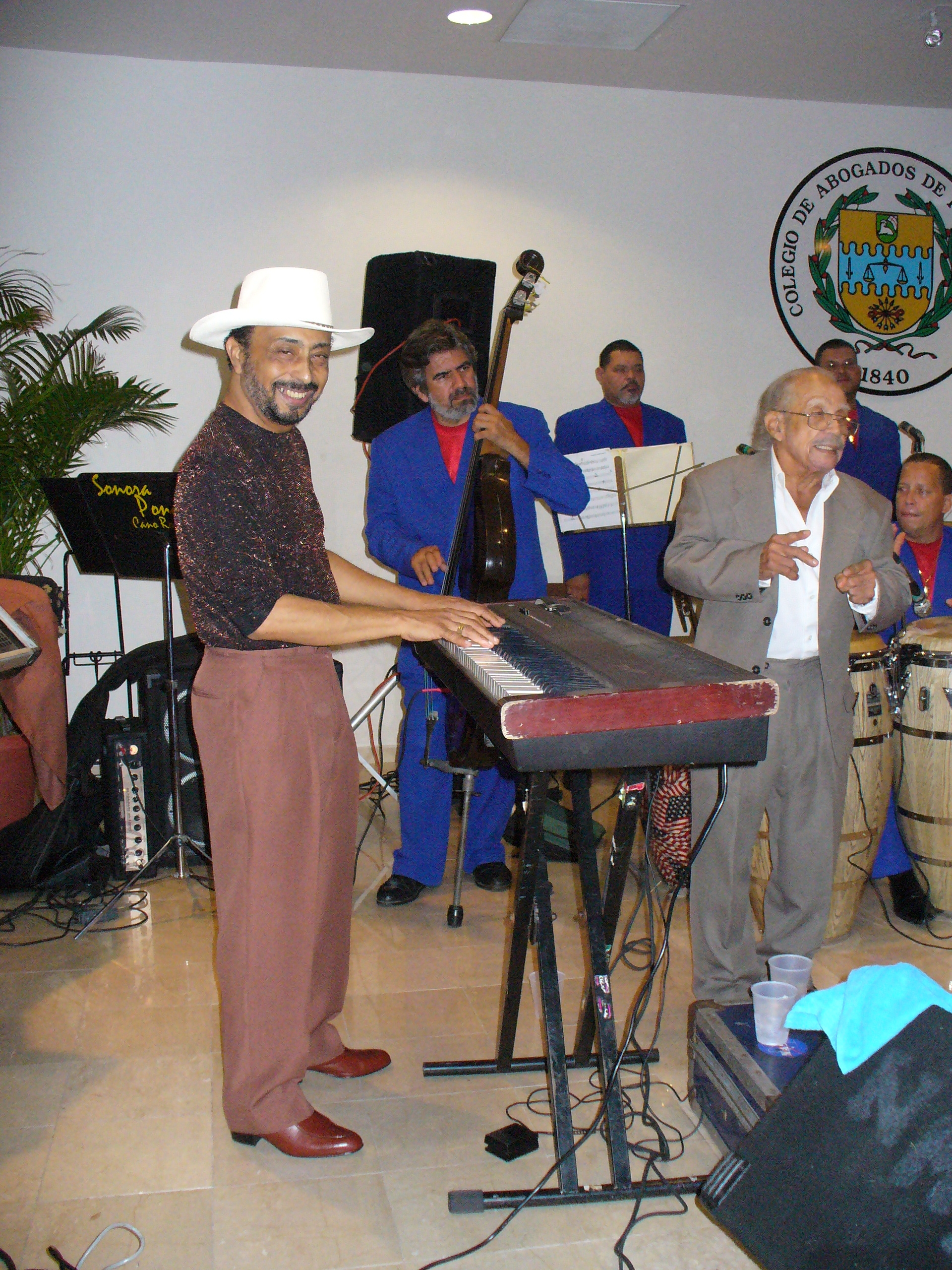
Papo Lucca, playing piano with the Sonora Ponceña; his father Quique Lucca stands next to him

=== Retirements ===
In 1974, singer Humberto "Tito" Gómez left the band after 7 years and 6 recordings. Together with Joe Rodríguez and Mickey Ortíz, Humberto "Tito" Gómez formed La Terrífica. Likewise, in 1977 Edgardo Morales, who played the timbal left the band after 7 years and 7 recordings and joined El Gran Combo de Puerto Rico. In 1978 singer Luis Guillermo "Luigui" Texidor left the band after 10 years and 10 recordings to join Bobby Valentín's Orchestra. In 1982 trumpetist Humberto Godineaux left the band after 4 years and 6 recordings. Singer Yolanda Rivera also left the band after 7 years and 8 recordings. In 1985, singer Miguel Ortíz retired from the band after 11 years and 12 recordings. On 28 May 1986, the band lost singer Alberto "Toñito" Ledée in a car accident. In 1987, trumpetist Heriberto "Ayatollah" Santiago also retired having 7 years and 5 recordings to his credit. In July 1989, long-time bass player Antonio "Tato" Santaella retired after 21 recordings. Tato played without ever using any musical scores, and sang entirely "by ear". A year later, in 1990, another bass player, Efraín "Frao" Hernández retired from the band after 10 years and 7 recordings. In 1990, bongó player Angel Hernández also retired after 14 years and 13 recordings. In 1991, tumbadora player, Vicente "Pequeño Johnny" Rivera, retired after 16 years with the band. He had performed on 15 of the band's recordings. In 1993, long-time trumpeter Ramón "Tony El Cordovés" Rodríguez retired after 24 recordings. This was followed by the retirement of trumpeter Freddie Del Valle, who had played with the band for 6 years and had participated in 5 recordings.

=== Internationalization ===
In 1993, the band played at the Magno Orchestra Festival in Barranquilla, Colombia. The band was awarded the "Congo de Oro" award, given to the best international band. And in October 1994, Sonora Ponceña celebrated its 40th anniversary with a festival at Estadio Juan Ramón Loubriel in Bayamón, Puerto Rico. The band would later also play at the Madison Square Garden to bring its celebration to the United States. In 1995, the band did a reunion recording with Luis Guillermo "Luigi" Texidor and Yolanda Rivera who had retired 19 and 14 years earlier, respectively. That same year, they sang in Paris, France, and at the Desfile de la Hispanidad (Hispanic Parade) in Zaragoza, Spain. In 1996 the band played for the first time in Mexico at the Boca del Río, Veracruz, Mexico, carnival.

=== Anniversary concerts ===
In 2000, Sonora Ponceña celebrated its 45th anniversary at the Tito Puente Amphitheatre at the Centro de Bellas Artes in San Juan, Puerto Rico and at the Teatro La Perla in Ponce. They also played in Caracas, Venezuela as part of this 45th anniversary celebration. In the years following 2000, La Sonora Ponceña participated in a large number of events throughout Puerto Rico, including Fiestas Patronales, private parties, graduation parties, and corporate Christmas and holiday parties. In the following years, the band also made presentations in Orlando, Jacksonville, Miami, Washington, D.C., Connecticut, Philadelphia, Baltimore, Chicago, New Jersey, Panama, Peru, England, Switzerland and Italy.

For its 50th anniversary (2004), the band played at Coliseo Rubén Rodríguez, in Bayamón, Puerto Rico. The 12,000 spectators made the show a complete sellout on its presentation day, February 21. The show was broadcast via radio and television.

== Accolades ==
- During its 50th anniversary show at Coliseo Rubén Rodríguez, the band was officially recognized by the Legislature of Puerto Rico for its musical contributions.
- The 23rd “Día Nacional de la Salsa”, celebrated in Carolina, Puerto Rico on 16 March 2004, was dedicated to Don Quique, Papo and la Sonora Ponceña.
- In Ponce there is a street, in Urb. Estancias del Golf, named after Quique Lucca.
- The 2003 "Feria de Turismo", celebrated at Complejo Turístico “La Guancha” in Ponce was dedicated to Don Quique, Papo and la Sonora Ponceña.

== Discography ==
- Hacheros Pa' Un Palo (Inca 1009, 1968)
- Fuego En El 23! (Inca 1017, 1969) (the "El 23" of the title track, was originally performed by Arsenio Rodríguez)
- Algo De Locura (Inca 1022, 1971)
- Navidad Criolla (Inca 1023, 1971)
- De Puerto Rico A New York (Inca 1029, 1972)
- Sonora Ponceña (Inca 1033, 1972)
- Sabor Sureño (Inca 1039, 1974)
- Lo Mejor De Sonora Ponceña (Inca 1045, 1975) compilation
- Tiene Pimienta (Inca 1047, 1975)
- Conquista Musical (Inca 1052, 1976)
- El Gigante Del Sur (Inca 1054, 1977)
- Explorando (Inca 1060, 1978)
- La Orquesta De Mi Tierra (Inca 1064, 1978)
- La Ceiba, with Celia Cruz (Vaya 84, 1979)
- Energized (Inca 1072, 1979) compilation
- New Heights (Inca 1074, 1980)
- Unchained Force (Inca 1077, 1980)
- Night Raider (Inca 1079, 1981)
- Determination (Inca 1080, 1982)
- Future (Inca 1081, 1984)
- Jubilee (Inca 1082, 1985)
- 30th Anniversary, Vol. 1 (Musica Latina International ML60, 1985)
- 30th Anniversary, Vol. 2 (Musica Latina International ML61, 1985)
- Back to Work (Inca 1083, 1987)
- On the Right Track (Inca 1084, 1988)
- Into the 90's (Inca 1085, 1990)
- Merry Christmas (Inca 1087, 1991)
- Guerreando (Inca 1086, 1992)
- Birthday Party (Inca 1088, 1993)
- Soul of Puerto Rico (Fania FA71, 1993) compilation
- Opening Doors (Charly Latin HOT513, 1993) compilation
- Apretando (Inca 1089, 1995)
- On Target (Fania/Emusica/UMG 773 130 197, 1998)
- 45 Aniversario Live (BMG U.S. Latin 74321 81167, 2000) 2-CD
- Back to the Road (Pianissimo Q&PL-001, 2003)
- 50 Aniversario (Pianissimo Q&PL-002, 2007)
- 50 Aniversario, Vol. II (Pianissimo Q&PL-003, 2007)
- Salsa Mayor (Fania/Emusica/UMG 773 130 438, 2008) compilation
- Otra Navidad Criolla (Pianissimo, 2008)
- Greatest Hits (Fania/Emusica/UMG 773 130 413, 2009) compilation
- 55 Aniversario (Pianissimo, 2009)
- Trayectoria + Consistencia = Sonora Ponceña (Pianissimo, 2010)
- El Gigante Sureño/A Band and Their Music (Fania/Código Music 463 950 8014, 2011) 2-CD compilation; re-released as Anthology (Fania/Código Music 463 950 7145, 2012)
- Historia De La Salsa (Fania/Código Music/Sony 88697 97780 23, 2011) compilation
- 10 Para Los 100 (Pianissimo, 2012)
- Hegemonia Musical (La Buena Fortuna, 2021)
- Christmas Star (JL Music, 2021)
