= Bobby Valentín =

Puerto Rican musician (born 1941)

Bobby Valentin
- Born: June 9, 1941 (age 85)
- Origin: Orocovis, Puerto Rico
- Genre: Salsa
- Occupations: Musician and bandleader
- Instruments: Bass guitar, trumpet, trombone, flugelhorn

Roberto "Bobby" Valentín Fret (born June 9, 1941), is a Puerto Rican musician and salsa bandleader. He is known as "El Rey del Bajo" (King of the Bass).

== Early years ==
Valentín was born in Orocovis, Puerto Rico. He was taught by his father to play the guitar at a young age. When his mother died in 1947, he went to live with his older sister and was raised in the town of Coamo where he received his primary education and studied music. When he was 11 years old, he participated in a local talent contest with a trio that he had formed. He played the guitar and sang for the trio and they won the first place prize. One of his teachers suggested that he attend the Jose I. Quinton Academy of Music, which he did. It was there that he learned to play the trumpet.

In 1956, Valentín moved with his family to New York City, United States, where he attended George Washington High School and continued to take music lessons. In 1958, he went to play for Joe Quijano but, shortly after, he played in the band of Willie Rosario, who was from the same neighborhood.

== Musical career ==
In 1963, Valentín joined Tito Rodriguez, and traveled twice with Rodriguez's orchestra to Venezuela. He also made musical arrangements for Rodriguez, and at times for Charlie Palmieri, Joe Quijano, Willie Rosario, and Ray Barretto. In 1965, he formed his own band and was signed by the Fania record label. He recorded Young Man With a Horn (1966). He held his first concert in Puerto Rico during that period of time. After several years with the same lead singer, Marcelino Morales, they parted, and Valentín introduced a new singer, Frankie Hernandez. About a year after he introduced another singer, Marvin Santiago; with him he had many hits, including "Soy Boricua" and "Jibaro y La Naturaleza." In 1975, Valentín left Fania Records and formed his own record label, Bronco Records, on which he recorded a pair of live albums from the State Penitentiary of Puerto Rico. After Hernandez left the band that year, Valentín employed Johnny Vazquez (a vocalist who remained in the band for over 15 years.) Santiago then left the band and was replaced by Carlos "Cano" Estremera (who remained in the band for seven years). In 1980, another singer, Rafu Warner, joined.

In 1982, the band had a hit with the song, "El Caiman," which was followed by another success with "Brujeria." In 1984, the band recorded En Accion, after this album Estremera left the band. In 1985, with a third singer in place, Luisito Carrion, they recorded Algo Excepcional, which yielded another hit single, "Me Diste de tu Agua". In 1986, the band released an album that featured the hit "Part Time Lover" a cover of the Stevie Wonder song, sung in Spanish by Rafu Warner. In 1988, he released the album that featured "Yo No Te Dejo De Amar" a cover of Michael Jackson's "I Just Can't Stop Loving You", again sung in Spanish by Warner. A couple of less successful albums followed, which saw Rafu replaced by Tato Peña. Como Nunca (1990) had another hit single, "Si Un Dia Te Sientes Sola." Giovanni Lugo joined the band and recorded the hit "Complicacion" in 1990. Symbol of Prestige (1997) introduced two new singers; a male and female duo of Marima and Juan Jose Hernandez.

In 2001, La Gran Reunion featured seven invited artists, including Nestor Sanchez, Luigi Texidor and Frankie Hernandez. In 2004, Valentin's En Vivo Desde Bellas Artes was released in DVD form, as was his 35th anniversary, Vuelve a la Carcel. Valentin's "El Caiman" can be heard in the video game, Scarface. After a seven year hiatus, Valentín returned with his album, Evolution, which saw Ray De La Paz sing with Louie Ramirez. In 2016, Mi Ritmo Es Bueno was issued, before 2018 saw the Latin jazz based instrumental album, Mind of a Master. As of 2020, Valentín is still performing around the world.

== Discography ==
- 1965- Young Man With A Horn (Fania 00332)
- 1966- Ritmo Pa' Gozar/El Mensajero (Disco Hit 2024)
- 1967- Bad Breath (Fania 00335)
- 1968- Let's Turn On/Arrebatarnos (Fania 00343)
- 1969- Se La Comió (Fania 00366)
- 1970- Algo Nuevo/Something New (Fania 00401)
- 1971- Rompecabezas (Fania 00418)
- 1972- Soy Boricua (Fania 00439)
- 1973- El Rey Del Bajo (00457)
- 1974- In Motion (Fania 00469)
- 1975- Va A La Carcel Vol. 1 (Bronco 101)
- 1975- Va A La Carcel Vol. 2 (Bronco 102)
- 1976- Afuera (Bronco 104)
- 1977- Musical Seduction (Bronco 106)
- 1978- Bobby Valentin (Bronco 107)
- 1979- Bobby Valentin (Bronco 111)
- 1980- Bobby Valentin (Bronco 114)
- 1981- Siempre En Forma (Bronco 120)
- 1982- Vicentico Valdés y la Orquesta Bobby Valentin (Bronco 121)
- 1982- Presenta Al Cano Estremera (Bronco 124)
- 1983- En La Lejania (Bronco 125)
- 1983- Bobby Valentin (Bronco 126)
- 1984- En Acción (Bronco 129)
- 1985- Presenta Orquesta Siguaraya (Bronco 133)
- 1985- Algo Excepcional (Bronco 135)
- 1986- Bobby Valentin (Bronco 143)
- 1988- Bobby Valentin (Bronco 148)
- 1989- Mas Amor (Bronco 153)
- 1991- Como Nunca (Bronco 157)
- 1997- Symbol of Prestige (Bronco 166)
- 2001- La Gran Reunion (Bronco 170)
- 2004- ¡En Vivo! 35 Aniversario- Vuelve A la Carcel (Bronco 171)
- 2008- Evolution (Bronco 176)
- 2016- Mi Ritmo Es Bueno (Bronco 178)
- 2018- Mind of a Master (Bronco 179)

== See also ==
- List of Puerto Ricans
