= Days and Nights of Blue Luck Inverted =

Studio album by Kip Hanrahan
- Released: 1988
- Genre: Jazz
- Length: 51:29
- Label: American Clave
- Producer: Kip Hanrahan

Kip Hanrahan chronology
A Few Short Notes for the End Run (1986)	Days and Nights of Blue Luck Inverted (1988)	Tenderness (1990)

Days and Nights of Blue Luck Inverted is a studio album by Kip Hanrahan, released in June 1988 and featuring guests including Carmen Lundy, Leo Nocentelli, and Steve Swallow. It made it into jazz reviewer Phillip Watson's top 15 albums of 1988.

== Background ==
The album was among the first released by record label Pangea, founded by English musician Sting. It took two years to produce. Like its predecessor Vertical's Currency, Days and Nights of Blue Luck Inverted was considered another step in the direction of an avant-garde reimagining of jazz, using elements of world music as its starting point to explore new and interesting directions for jazz.

== Critical reception ==
On release music reviewer Peter Watrous praised the album in Musician, writing that "Hanrahan avoids the mold; his records constitute one of the more fruitful experiments of the '80s, an experiment that people will want to listen to for a long time. It's also music that sums up the intelligent side of our age, inquisitive, open minded, sensuous. That it existed in the era of Reagan will be one of the mysteries to be debated by social historians." Lee Jeske, writing in Cashbox, described the album's mood as "simmering sensuality - thick and exotic".

Phillip Watson ranked the album among the best released in 1988, writing that "With its 'optional side endings' and enigmatic titles, like its equivocations, its irreverence - it succeeds because it has rules all of its own."

== Track listing ==
No.	Title	Length
1.	"Love Is Like a Cigarette"	5:45
2.	"A Poker Game; Luck Inverts Itself; Four Swimmers"	6:06
3.	"Gender"	3:34
4.	"Marriage"	3:24
5.	"American Clave"	3:49
6.	"A Model Bronx Childhood"	2:47
7.	"Ah, Intruder! (Female)"	6:13
8.	"Lisbon: Blue Request"	6:09
9.	"My Life Outside of Power"	1:42
10.	"Road Song"	3:54
11.	"The First and Last to Love Me (2, December)"	4:34
12.	"Unobtainable Days: Unobtainable Nights"	3:20

== Personnel ==
- Charles Neville – alto saxophone
- Rolando Napolean Briceno – alto saxophone
- Mario Rivera – baritone saxophone
- Andy Gonzalez – bass
- Milton Cardona – congas
- Orlando Ríos – congas
- Giovanni Hidalgo – congas
- Ignacio Berroa – drums (traps)
- Robbie Ameen – drums (traps)
- Willie Green – drums (traps)
- Jack Bruce – electric bass
- Steve Swallow – electric bass, piano
- Leo Nocentelli – electric guitar
- Anton Fier – percussion (Lyndrum)
- Kip Hanrahan – percussion, guitar, keyboards (Synclavier), voice, percussion (Lyndrum)
- Pablo Ziegler – piano
- Peter Scherer – piano, keyboards (Synclavier)
- David Murray – tenor saxophone
- George Adams – tenor saxophone
- John Stubblefield – tenor saxophone
- Lew Soloff – trumpet
- Jerry Gonzalez – trumpet, congas
- Alfredo Triff – violin
- Carmen Lundy – voice
- Fernando Saunders – voice, electric bass
