= Robby Ameen =

American musician (born 1960)

- Born: December 7, 1960 (age 65)
- Origin: New Haven, Connecticut, U.S.
- Genre: Jazz
- Occupations: Drummer, composer, bandleader, educator
- Website: www.robbyameenmusic.com

Robby Ameen (born December 7, 1960) is an American drummer, composer, bandleader, and educator who resides in New York City. Although he is of Lebanese Druze origin, Ameen is best known for the unique and powerful Afro-Cuban style he has created. He is regarded as one of the world's most prominent drummers in the area of Latin Jazz.

In 1985, he became a member of Ruben Blades’ Seis del Solar band. Other long-term band memberships include Dave Valentin, Conrad Herwig's "Latin Side of… All Stars", Kip Hanrahan, and Jack Bruce and the Cuicoland Express. In 2011, Ameen won a Latin Grammy for best Salsa record with Ruben Blades and Seis del Solar, "Todos Vuelven Live, Vol. 1 and 2." As a sideman he has recorded on other Grammy winning records including Ruben Blades and Seis del Solar's “Escenas” and Brian Lynch's “Simpatico”.

Ameen was the drummer from the inception of the Paul Simon album Songs from The Capeman, as well as having been the drummer throughout "The Capeman" show's run on Broadway in 1997-1998. In 2012, Ameen was the subject of an episode of the Emmy Award-winning Detroit Public Television series "Arab American Stories".

== Early life and education ==
Ameen was born in 1960 in New Haven, Connecticut. He first studied drum set with CJ Everett at a local music school. At the age of twelve, he performed the Edgar Varese percussion piece Ionisation under the baton of conductor Nicolas Slonimsky.

When Ameen was fifteen, he learned that the jazz drummer Ed Blackwell was teaching nearby at Wesleyan University and started going to his house for the next couple of years. While at Yale University, he studied classical percussion with Fred Hinger, longtime principal timpanist with the Metropolitan Opera. He earned a BA in Literature from Yale University in 1982.

== Career ==
Robby Ameen has currently recorded ten records as a leader or co-leader. As a sideman, he has appeared on hundreds of records with such artists as Ruben Blades, Dizzy Gillespie, Dave Valentin, Eddie Palmieri, Paul Simon, Jack Bruce, Kip Hanrahan, Conrad Herwig, Carly Simon, Mongo Santamaria, Hilton Ruiz, Kirsty MacColl, and many others. As a session musician Ameen has recorded numerous jingles, film scores, and TV music, including the popular HBO series Sex and the City.

As an educator, Ameen is the co-author with bassist Lincoln Goines of the best-selling instructional book “Funkifying the Clave: Afro-Cuban drums for Bass and Drums” (Alfred Music), and the follow-up DVD, “Funkifying the Clave: Afro-Cuban drums for Bass and Drums” (Alfred Music). He is an international clinician and percussion/drum festival participant, including the Modern Drummer Festival and PASIC and also serves as a faculty member of Mason Gross School of the Arts at Rutgers University.

Ameen began playing professionally as a teenager in New Haven and moved to New York City in 1981. He joined Dave Valentin's band in 1983, with whom he recorded and toured until Valentin's death in 2017. In 1985, Ruben Blades decided to add drums on his second Seis del Solar record, Escenas, whereupon Blades asked Ameen to become a permanent member of his band. This was one of the first salsa bands to incorporate a drumset in what was primarily a percussion-based rhythm section. In the same year, Ameen started his longtime relationship with Kip Hanrahan with whom he would tour and record 17 records. Through Hanrahan he worked with Jack Bruce, eventually joining Bruce's Cuicoland Express band in the 2000s.

Ameen has also collaborated with trombonist Conrad Herwig, whom he met at the Interlochen Center for the Arts in 1975. While Ameen continues to work steadily as a session drummer and sideman, he has also been focusing on composing and working as a bandleader.

== Discography ==
=== As a leader ===
- Robby Ameen Live at the Poster Museum (2024) Origin Records
- Robby Ameen Diluvio (2020) Origin Records
- Robby Ameen Days in the Night (2015) Two and Four Records
- Robby Ameen Days in the Life (2009) Two and Four Records

=== As a co-leader ===
- Horacio "el Negro" Hernandez and Robby Ameen Robby and Negro at the Third World War (2006) American Clave/Enja
- El Negro and Robby Onto the Street (2003) EWE
- El Negro and Robby Band Live at Umbria Jazz (2004) Il Manifesto
- Seis del Solar Decision (1992) Messidor
- Seis del Solar Alternate Roots (1995) Messidor
- Overproof Three Guys Walk into a Bar (2004) EWE

=== As a sideman (selected) ===
With Dizzy Gillespie

- Dizzy Gillespie New Faces (1984) GRP
- Dizzy Gillespie Endlessly (1988) MCA

With Ruben Blades

- Ruben Blades y Seis del Solar Escenas (1985) Elektra-Asylum
- Ruben Blades y Seis del Solar Agua de Luna (1986) Elektra-Asylum
- Crossover Dreams(Original Motion Picture Soundtrack) (1986) Elecktra-Asylum
- Ruben Blades Nothing but the Truth (Rubén Blades album) (1988) Elektra-Asylum
- Ruben Blades ''Ruben Blades y Son del Solar...Live!'' (1990) Elektra-Asylum
- Ruben Blades and Son del Solar Caminando (album) (1991) Sony
- Ruben Blades and Son del Solar Amor y Control (1992) CBS Records
- Ruben Blades and Seis del Solar Todos Vuelven Live, Vol. 1 (2011) Ruben Blades Productions
- Ruben Blades and Seis del Solar Todos Vuelven Live, Vol. 2 (2011) Ruben Blades Productions

With Paul Simon

- Paul Simon Songs from The Capeman (1997) Warner Bros. Records
- Paul Simon The Capeman (Original Broadway Cast Recording) (1998)

With Dave Valentin

- Dave Valentin Kalahari (1984) GRP
- Dave Valentin Jungle Garden (1985) GRP
- Dave Valentin Light Struck (1986) GRP
- Dave Valentin Mind Time (1987) GRP
- Dave Valentin Live at the Blue Note (1988) GRP
- Dave Valentin Two Amigos (1990) GRP
- Dave Valentin Musical Portraits (1991) GRP
- Dave Valentin Red Sun (1993) GRP
- Dave Valentin Tropic Heat (1994) GRP
- Dave Valentin Primitive Passions (1996) RMM Records
- Dave Valentin Sunshower (1999) Concord Vista
- Dave Valentin World on a String (2005) HighNote Records
- Dave Valentin Come Fly with Me (2006) HighNote Records
- Dave Valentin Pure Imagination (2011) HighNote Records

With Eddie Palmieri

- Eddie Palmieri Ritmo Caliente (2003) Concord Picante
- Eddie Palmieri El Rumbero del Piano (1998) RMM/Universal
- Eddie Palmieri Palmas (1994) Nonesuch
- Eddie Palmieri Sueno (1982) Intuition

With Conrad Herwig

- Conrad Herwig Another Kind of Blue: The Latin Side of Miles Davis(2004) Half Note
- Conrad Herwig Que Viva Coltrane (2004) Criss Cross
- Conrad Herwig Sketches of Spain y Mas: The Latin Side of Miles Davis (2006) Half Note
- Conrad Herwig The Latin Side of Wayne Shorter (2008) Half Note
- Conrad Herwig The Latin Side of Herbie Hancock (2010) Half Note
- Conrad Herwig The Latin Side of Joe Henderson (2014) Half Note
- Conrad Herwig The Latin Side of Horace Silver (2021) Savant
- Conrad Herwig The Latin Side of Charles Mingus (2022) Savant
- Conrad Herwig The Latin Side of McCoy Tyner (2024) Savant

With Kip Hanrahan

- Kip Hanrahan Crescent Moon Waning (2018) American Clave
- Kip Hanrahan Beautiful Scars (2007) Enja/Weber
- Kip Hanrahan Piñero (soundtrack) (2002) American Clave
- Kip Hanrahan Shadow Nights, Vol. 2' (1999) American Clave
- Kip Hanrahan A Thousand Nights and a Night(Shadow Night (1997) American Clave
- Kip Hanrahan All Roads Are Made of the Flesh (1995) American Clave
- Kip Hanrahan Exotica (Kip Hanrahan album)(1992) American Clave
- Kip Hanrahan Days and Nights of Blue Luck Inverted(1988) American Clave
- Kip Hanrahan Tenderness (1990) American Clave
- Paul Haines Darn it! (1993) American Clave

With Jack Bruce

- Jack Bruce Live at the Milkyway (2011) EMI
- Jack Bruce More Jack than God (2003) Sanctuary
- Jack Bruce Live at the Canterbury Fayre (2003) Classic Rock Productions
- Jack Bruce (Shadows in the Air (2001) Sanctuary

Carly Simon This Kind of Love (2008) Hear Music

- Steve Swallow Swallow (Xtra Watt, 1991)
- Mongo Santamaria Mongo Returns! (1998) Milestone
- Hilton Ruiz Strut (1989) Novus
- Kirsty MacColl Electric Landlady (1991) BMG/Union Square Music
- Bill O'Connell Wind off the Hudson (2019) Savant
- Bill O'Connell Jazz Latin (2018) Savant
- David Byrne Rei Momo (1989) Sire/Luaka Bop
- Brian Lynch Simpatico (2006) Artist Share
- Deep Rumba A Calm in the Fire of Dances (2000) American Clave
- Deep Rumba This Night Becomes a Rumba (1998) American Clave
- Michael Reissler Big Circle (2012) Intuition
- Michael Reissler Honey and Ash (1998) Enja
- Michael Reissler Momentum Mobile (1995) Enja
- Conjure Bad Mouth (2006) American Clave
- Conjure Cab Calloway Stands in for the Moon (1995) American Clave
- Daniel Ponce Chango te Llama (1991) Mango
- Milton Cardona Cambucha (1999) American Clave
- Silvana DeLuigi Yo (2004) American Clave
- Earl Klugh Midnight in San Juan (1990) Warner Bros.
- Tim Ries The Rolling Stones Project (2008) Concord Jazz
- Ramsey Lewis Legends of Jazz with Ramsey Lewis (Box Set) (2006) Evosound
- Combo Piano (Takuma Watanabe) Agatha (2011) EWE
- Combo Piano (Takuma Watanabe) Another Rumor (2012) EWE
- Monday Michiru Selections (1997-2000) (2001) Polydor K.K.
- Ned Sublette Cowboy Rumba (1999) Palm Pictures
- Alfredo Triff 21 Broken Melodies (2001) American Clave
- Michele Rosewoman’s New Yor-Uba Hallowed (2019) Advance Dance Diques
- Lincoln Goines The Art of the Bass Choir (2022) Origin Records
- Eva Cortes Crossing Borders (2017) Origin
- Doug Beavers Sol (2021) Circle 9 Records
- Doug Beavers Luna (2023) Circle 9 Records
- Santi DeBriano & Arkestra Bembe Ashanti (2022) JOJO RECORDS
- Bobby Rozario Spellbound (2023) Origin Records
- Bobby Rozario Healer (2025) Origin Records
- Oscar Hernandez No Words Needed (2024) Ovation Records

== Equipment ==
Ameen uses Pearl drums, Istanbul Mehmet cymbals, Latin Percussion, Vater drumsticks, and Remo Drumheads.

Drums: Pearl Masters Maple Gum in hand rubbed natural maple:

- Bass drum 22"x16"
- Rack tom 10"x7"
- Rack tom 12"x8"
- Floor tom 14"x14"
- Floor tom 16"x16"

Cymbals: Istanbul Mehmet:

- Legend Dark hi-hats 13" or Hamer hi-hats 15"
- Turk crash 17" or Traditional thin crash 17"
- X-Ray 6 crash 18"/X-Metal 12" splash (stacked)
- X-Jazz splash 10"
- Session splash 10"
- 61st Anniversary flat ride 22"
- X-Rubbish crash 17"
- Turk crash 18"
- Turk china 18" or X-Ray Random Turk crash 18"

Gear

- Pearl Redline Eliminator kick pedal
- Vater Los Angeles 5A wood (16"x.570" shorter taper) drumsticks
- Vater Session wood (16"x.570" longer taper) drumsticks
