= Piñero (soundtrack) =

Original Music from the Soundtrack to Piñero

Soundtrack album by Kip Hanrahan
- Released: 2002
- Studio: Sorcerer Sound
- Genre: Jazz
- Length: 48:32
- Label: American Clave
- Producer: Kip Hanrahan

Kip Hanrahan chronology
Drawn from Memory (Greatest Hits or Whatever) (2001)	Original Music from the Soundtrack to Piñero (2002)	Beautiful Scars (2007)

Original Music from the Soundtrack to Piñero is the soundtrack to the 2001 film Piñero by producer Kip Hanrahan. Released in March 2002, the album includes performances by Horacio "El Negro" Hernández, Robby Ameen, and Milton Cardona.

== Critical reception ==
The Guardian reviewed the album, giving it five stars and saying, "The album cleverly reinvents several perennially engaging musics: noir atmospherics; Puerto Rican and Afro-Cuban groove fundamentals; Bitches Brew-era space music; Latin boogaloo."

All About Jazz reviewer John Eyles said in a review, "The predominant sound is a low-key, noir-ish Latin jazz fusion, dominated by electric bass, percussion and trumpet, which creates an oppressive sense of imminent danger. The film stars Benjamin Bratt, who voices some atmospheric scene-setting sections of the album; these are used sparingly enough so as not to intrude, but to enhance the air of sleaze and menace. In a large ensemble cast of musicians, key performances come from pianist Edsel Gomez, bass guitarist Fernandez Saunders and particularly trumpeter Jerry Gonzalez."

Jim Trageser reviewed the album for the Summer 2004 issue of Turbula, saying, "And so the music is New York – smart and sophisticated and dark and seedy and ebullient and tired and hard and sentimental, all at the same time. With a beat, always a beat, because New York is a city that lives to its rhythms."

== Track listing ==
No.	Title	Length
1.	"Miguel Leaves Puerto Rico"	0:52
2.	"Exterior New York - Night"	1:08
3.	"Shahrazade and the Opening of the First Shadow Night (Mikey Enters the Shooting Gallery)"	2:53
4.	"Parole Hearing"	1:57
5.	"Three Card Monte"	:31
6.	"Stealing the Furs Boogaloo"	2:55
7.	"Childhood Damage"	1:36
8.	"Look, the Moon... (Diahnne's) (Sugar's Theme)"	7:29
9.	"Estate of Mind"	1:48
10.	"Needle State Building"	1:41
11.	"Una Noche de Verano Comenca / Shahrazade / Puntillo / Yambhoracio (The Opening of the NuYorican Poet's Café)"	2:25
12.	"Mother's Prison Visit..."	:44
13.	"Short Eyes Prison Rehearsal Boogaloo"	2:57
14.	"Diente de Oro [Opening Night Celebration]"	4:37
15.	"Aguaybana Zemi [The Cause]"	6:36
16.	"Junkie Christ"	2:20
17.	"Father? Well He Fucked My Mother, and Made Me..."	:39
18.	"His Mother's Funeral"	1:21
19.	"La Perla"	1:07
20.	"Today Just Ain't My Day / Dominican Heist / The End of a Lifetime of Friendship"	2:28
21.	"Can't Fly on One Wing..."	1:27
22.	""Ladies and Gentleman, Please Welcome Miguel Pinero"..."	1:43
23.	"Leaving the Reception"	1:20
24.	"Look, the Moon (Carmen's)"	5:06
25.	"Shahrazade and the Opening of the First Shadow Night (Last Call)"	2:00
26.	"Mikey Falls / Obatala"	1:27
27.	"Shahrazade and the Opening of the First Shadow Night / Funeral Poem Celebration / Scattering the Ashes"	4:18

== Personnel ==
- Chocolate Armenteros – trumpet
- Jerry Gonzalez – trumpet, percussion (quinto)
- Papo Vasquez – trombone
- Mario Rivera – baritone saxophone
- Mauricio Smith – flute
- Alfredo Triff – violin
- Lysandro Arias – piano
- Edsel Gomez – piano, electric piano
- Peter Scherer – keyboards
- Leo Nocentelli – guitar
- Andy Gonzalez – bass
- Fernando Saunders – bass guitar
- Robby Ameen – drums, congas, percussion
- Horacio "El Negro" Hernandez – drums, percussion
- Kip Hanrahan – percussion
- Richie Flores – congas
- Paoli Mejias – congas, percussion (quinto)
- Carlos Mestre – congas
- Edgardo Miranda – cuatro
- Yomo Toro – cuatro
- Vincente George – guiro
- Amadito Valdez – timbales
- Orlando Rios – vocals, batá drum
- Abraham Rodriguez – voice, batá drum, claves, congas
- Frankie Rodriguez – lead vocals
- Benjamin Bratt – vocals
- Felix Sanabria – vocals, batá drum
