= Desire Develops an Edge =

Studio album by Kip Hanrahan
- Released: 1983
- Studio: Latin Sound Studios and Eurosound, New York City
- Genre: Jazz
- Length: 1:04:48
- Label: American Clavé 1008/9
- Producer: Kip Hanrahan

Kip Hanrahan chronology
Coup de Tête (1982)	Desire Develops an Edge (1983)	Vertical's Currency (1984)

Desire Develops an Edge is the second studio album by Kip Hanrahan, released in 1983 on Hanrahan's own label American Clavé and featuring guests including Jerry Gonzalez, Jamaaladeen Tacuma, and Chico Freeman. Initially on vinyl it contained an LP and an EP; the CD release via the German label VeraBra differed in the sequence of the tracks and the song "Late Fall" instead of "The Edge You Always Loved in Me".

== Background ==
This was the first album Kip created with Jack Bruce and Steve Swallow, both of whom would go on to be on many future Hanrahan albums.

== Critical reception ==
Le Monde described the album in a review, saying "Desire is a record of jazz rock and salsa the way it should be today: inventive, moving, incisive, surprising. On top of everything else, it's so sensual! ...Jack Bruce gives one of the unforgettable vocal performances of the epoch... Desire Develops an Edge is not the record of the year, 1984 will be the year of Desire"

== Track listing ==
No.	Title	Writer(s)	Length
1.	"Two (Still in Half-Light)"	Kip Hanrahan	5:36
2.	"Early Fall"	Hanrahan, arranged with Alberto Bengolea	2:09
3.	"Velasquez"	Hanrahan, arr. w/Steve Swallow	5:04
4.	"(Don't Complicate) The Life (La Vie)"	Ti'Plume Ricardo Franck, Kip Hanrahan, Paul Haines, Jean Claude Desgrottes, Tico Harry Sylvain	6:44
5.	"The Edge You Always Loved in Me"	Hanrahan, arr. w/Bengolea	2:22
6.	"Sara Wadé"	Trad., arr. by Puntilla Orlando Rios	2:54
7.	"Far from Freetown"	Elysee Pyronneau, Hanrahan, Swallow	1:31
8.	"All Us Working Class Boys (For Jack Bruce)"	Hanrahan, Swallow	3:58
9.	"Child Song"	Jack Bruce, Pete Brown, arr. by Bruce, Hanrahan	2:35
10.	"Trust Me Yet?"	Hanrahan, Swallow	4:53
11.	"Nancy (The Silence Focuses on You...)"	Swallow, Hanrahan, Arto Lindsay, arr. by Swallow	4:28
12.	"Desire Develops an Edge"	Hanrahan, arr. w/Tico Harry Sylvain	6:15
13.	"What Is This Dance, Anyway?"	Nemours Jean-Baptiste, Frisner Augustin, Hanrahan, Haines, arr. by Bengolea, Hanrahan	3:41
14.	"Meaning a Visa (For Puntilla, Olufemi and Jean Rouch)"	Bruce, Hanrahan, Haines, arr. by Hanrahan	3:40
15.	"Nocturnal Heart (Coracão Noturno) (For John Stubblefield)"	Edu Lobo, Cacaso, Hanrahan, Lindsay, arr. by Daniel Frieberg, Hanrahan	4:54
16.	"Her Boyfriend Assesses His Value and Pleads His Case"	Hanrahan	4:33
17.	"Jack and the Golden Palominos (For Chico Buarque)"	Hanrahan, arr. w/Frieberg	3:49

== Personnel ==
- Kip Hanrahan – direction; percussion (1, 4, 16), vocals (4, 10)
- Molly Farley – vocals (4, 7, 13)
- Jack Bruce – vocals (1–5, 8–11, 13–17), electric bass (9, 13, 16)
- Steve Swallow – electric bass (1, 3, 4, 7, 8, 10, 11, 14), piano (8, 11)
- Jamaaladeen Tacuma – electric bass (1, 4, 17)
- Sérgio Brandão – electric bass (2, 5, 15)
- Arto Lindsay – electric guitar (1–3, 5, 7–10, 14–17), vocals (4)
- Elysee Pyronneau – electric guitar (2–5, 7, 9, 12, 13, 16), vocals (4)
- Alberto Bengolea – electric guitar (2, 5, 9, 14, 16), acoustic guitar (15)
- Jody Harris – electric guitar (3, 14, 17)
- Ti'Plume Ricardo Franck – electric guitar and vocals (4)
- Jean Claude Jean – electric guitar (9, 13)
- John Scofield – acoustic guitar (11)
- Jerry Gonzalez – congas (1, 2, 4, 5, 7, 8, 10, 15), percussion (4), claves (6), trumpet (12)
- Puntilla Orlando Rios – congas (1–4, 7–10, 14, 16), percussion (1, 4, 14, 16), quinto (5, 12), vocals (6), shekere (9)
- Olufemi Claudette Mitchell – shekere (4, 9), vocals (4), percussion (14, 16)
- Milton Cardona – congas (4, 8, 12, 13, 16), shekere (4)
- Frisner Augustin – congas (9), tambou (13, 16)
- Gene Golden - congas (13, 16)
- David Moss – percussion (17)
- Ignacio Berroa – drums (1, 3, 7, 9, 14, 15)
- Anton Fier – drums (2, 3, 5, 7, 15, 17)
- Tico Harry Sylvain – drums (4, 8, 15)
- Hannibal Marvin Peterson – trumpet (13)
- Ricky Ford – tenor saxophone (1, 2, 5, 8, 10, 13, 15)
- John Stubblefield – tenor saxophone (1, 8, 13, 17)
- Ned Rothenberg – tenor saxophone (8)
- Teo Macero – tenor saxophone (13)
- Mario Rivera – baritone saxophone (13)
- John Zorn – alto saxophone (17)

== Technical personnel ==
- Kip Hanrahan – producer
- Scott Marcus – executive producer
- Jon Fausty - recording and mixing engineer
- David Rodriguez - recording engineer
- Jack Adelman - mastering
- Capoeira Graphics - cover design
- Andy Freeberg - photography
