= The Rough Dancer and the Cyclical Night (Tango Apasionado) =

Studio album by Astor Piazzolla
- Released: 1988
- Recorded: 1987
- Genre: Tango
- Label: American Clavé
- Producer: Kip Hanrahan, Astor Piazzolla

Astor Piazzolla chronology
Tango: Zero Hour (1986)	The Rough Dancer and the Cyclical Night (Tango Apasionado) (1988)	La Camorra: La Soledad de la Provacación Apasionada (The Solitude of Passionate Provocation) (1989)

The Rough Dancer and the Cyclical Night (Tango Apasionado) is an album by the Argentinian musician Astor Piazzolla. It was released in 1988. The album was reissued by Nonesuch Records in the late 1990s.

== Production ==
Recorded in New York City in 1987, the album was produced by Kip Hanrahan and Piazzolla. Its music was originally developed as a theater performance about the history of the tango. Piazzolla, who played the bandoneon, recorded the album with his Quinteto Tango Nuevo. Paquito D'Rivera played saxophone on Rough Dancer. Pablo Ziegler and Pablo Zinger played piano; Zinger had acted as the musical director for the stage production. Horacio Malvicino played guitar. Piazzolla wrote in the liner notes of his desire to have the music sound as if it were played by "'half-drunk musicians in a bordello.'"

== Critical reception ==
Professional ratings
Review scores
Source	Rating
AllMusic	4/5 stars
Robert Christgau	A−
The Encyclopedia of Popular Music	4/5 stars
Knoxville News Sentinel	A
Los Angeles Daily News	4/4 stars
MusicHound World: The Essential Album Guide	4/5 stars

Robert Christgau noted that Piazzolla is "closer to Bartok the composer than to Ellington the orchestrator, and tends to limit improvisatory space." The Philadelphia Inquirer wrote that the music "retains—and embellishes—the not-quite-smoldering sensuality characteristic of traditional tango."

AllMusic wrote that, "unlike Zero Hour ... Rough Dancer has more of whimsical feel, with the often perilous shifts in tempo and mood of the earlier record being handled in smoother fashion here." Reviewing a reissue package, the Austin American-Statesman's Don McLeese opined that, "in a manner beyond form or category, this is some of the most sublimely mesmerizing music I've ever experienced." The Los Angeles Daily News deemed it "a quiet gem" and "romantic, melodic and lush." The Plain Dealer concluded that it "vividly documents the composer's deep roots in the traditional dance form and the edgy innovations of his nuevo tango."

== Track listing ==
No.	Title	Length
1.	"Prologue (Tango Apasionado)"
2.	"Milonga for Three"
3.	"Street Tango"
4.	"Milonga Picaresque"
5.	"Knife Fight"
6.	"Leonora's Song"
7.	"Prelude to the Cyclical Night (Part One)"
8.	"Butcher's Death"
9.	"Leijia's Game"
10.	"Milonga for Three (Reprise)"
11.	"Bailongo"
12.	"Leonora's Love Theme"
13.	"Finale (Tango Apasionado)"
14.	"Prelude to the Cyclical Night (Part Two)"
