= Tenderness (Kip Hanrahan album) =

Studio album by Kip Hanrahan
- Released: 1990
- Recorded: December 1988 – March 1990
- Studio: RPM Sound Studios, Skyline Studios, Sorcerer Sound, Sound Ideas Studios, Sound on Sound, New York City
- Genre: Jazz, pop, rock
- Length: 74:47
- Label: American Clave
- Producer: Kip Hanrahan

Kip Hanrahan chronology
Days and Nights of Blue Luck Inverted (1990)	Tenderness (1990)	Exotica (1993)

Tenderness is an album by Kip Hanrahan that was released in 1990. It includes guest work by Sting, Alfredo "Chocolate" Armenteros, and Giovanni Hidalgo.

== Critical reception ==
The Boston Globe said the album "blurs the lines between jazz, rock and Latin music with a raw, sensual complexity through this mysterious 16-song cycle."

The Philadelphia Inquirer listed Tenderness as one of its "10 best pop albums of 1990".

== Track listing ==
No.	Title	Length
1.	"...Faith in the Pants, Not in the Prick... (Vallejo's Folk Song)"	5:37
2.	"...When I Lose Myself in the Darkness and Pain of Love, No, This Love..."	5:37
3.	"...She Turned So That Maybe a Third of Her Face Was in This Fuckin' Beautiful Half-Light..."	4:31
4.	"...At the Same Time, As the Subway Train Was Pulling Out of the Station..."	4:29
5.	"...I Told Him 'I Don't Have to Be Beaten to Be Understood'..."	6:01
6.	"...Look, the Moon... (Diahnne's)"	5:05
7.	"...Half of Sex Is Fear..."	6:26
8.	"Gillian's Folk Song"	3:47
9.	"History"	5:15
10.	"...There Was Something About His Anger That Was So...Inaccessible to Me..."	5:45
11.	"...If I Knew How to, If I Knew What Muscles to Relax..."	3:13
12.	"...You're No Pimp, and I'm Certainly No Whore..."	1:31
13.	"Deep Summer"	4:13
14.	"...Look, the Moon... (Carmen's)"	5:44
15.	"In Place of an Epilog: Lullabye for My Daughter"	3:04
16.	"In Place of a Moral: Geography"	5:05

== Personnel ==
- Kip Hanrahan – voice, percussion
- Alfredo "Chocolate" Armenteros – trumpet
- Chico Freeman – tenor saxophone
- Don Pullen – piano
- Alfredo Triff – violin
- Leo Nocentelli – electric and acoustic guitars
- Sting – voice, bass guitar
- Fernando Saunders – voice, bass guitar
- Diahnne Abbott – voice
- Carmen Lundy – voice
- Lucy Penabaz – voice
- Robby Ameen – drums, traps
- Ignacio Berroa – drums, traps
- Andrew Cyrille – drums, traps
- Marvin Smith – drums, traps
- Cecilia Engelhardt – percussion
- Richie Flores – percussion, congas
- Giovanni Hidalgo – percussion, congas, quinto
- Andy González – double bass
- Milton Cardona – percussion, congas
