= Songs from The Capeman =

Studio album by Paul Simon
- Released: November 18, 1997
- Recorded: 1997
- Studios: The Hit Factory (New York City); Paul Simon's home
- Genres: Musical theatre, pop, worldbeat
- Length: 55:35
- Label: Warner Bros.
- Producer: Paul Simon

Paul Simon chronology
Paul Simon's Concert in the Park (1991)	Songs from The Capeman (1997)	Greatest Hits: Shining Like a National Guitar (2000)

Songs from The Capeman is the ninth solo studio album by the American singer-songwriter Paul Simon, released in 1997 by Warner Bros. Records. His first new studio album of original material in seven years, it contains Simon's own performances of songs from the Broadway musical he wrote and produced called The Capeman, augmented by members of the original cast. The songs retell the story of Salvador Agron, who was known as the "Capeman". A departure musically from his earlier work, the album features doo-wop, rock and roll and Puerto Rican rhythms, and a number of songs contain explicit lyrics, a first for Simon. The stage show was a commercial flop, losing $11 million, and the album did not sell well. It peaked at number 42 on the Billboard 200, the lowest chart position in Simon's career at the time.

Professional ratings
Review scores
Source	Rating
AllMusic	2/5 stars
Entertainment Weekly	A−
Rolling Stone	4/5 stars

== Track listing ==
All songs written by Paul Simon, with lyrics co-written by Derek Walcott.

1. "Adios Hermanos" – 4:42
2. "Born in Puerto Rico" – 4:54
3. "Satin Summer Nights" – 5:46
4. "Bernadette" – 3:28
5. "The Vampires" – 5:06
6. "Quality" – 4:10
7. "Can I Forgive Him" – 6:02
8. "Sunday Afternoon" – 3:25
9. "Killer Wants to Go to College" – 1:51
10. "Time Is an Ocean" – 5:24
11. "Virgil" – 2:50
12. "Killer Wants to Go to College II" – 2:10
13. "Trailways Bus" – 5:15

== Personnel ==
Credits adapted from CD liner notes.

Musicians

- Paul Simon – lead vocal (1–13), acoustic guitar (2–4, 7–13), background vocal (3–4, 6), hi-string guitar (4, 8)
- Marc Anthony – lead vocal (3, 10)
- Rubén Blades – lead vocal (10)
- Ednita Nazario – lead vocal (8)
- Briz – background vocal (1, 3)
- Myrna Lynn Gomila – background vocal (1, 3–4, 6), duo vocal (3, 6)
- Karen Bernod – background vocal (1, 3)
- Renee Connell-Adams – background vocal (1, 3)
- DeWayne Snipe – background vocal (1, 3)
- Kia Jeffries – background vocal (1, 3)
- Ed Vasquez – background vocal (1, 3)
- Derrick James – background vocal (1, 3)
- Oriente Lopez – organ (1), flute (2, 8, 10), Fender Rhodes (13)
- Danny Rivera – coro vocal (2)
- Ray De La Paz – background vocal (2, 4)
- Nestor Sanchez – background vocal (2)
- Oscar Hernández – piano (2, 5, 8, 10), synthesizer (2, 4), celeste (4), vibes (4), glockenspiel (4)
- Nelson González – tres (2), plenaro (2)
- Edgardo Miranda – cuatro (2–3)
- Vincent Nguini – guitar (2, 4, 10, 13)
- John Beal – bass guitar (2, 4)
- Robby Ameen – drums (2, 4, 10), guitar case kick drum (4)
- Bobby Allende – bongos (2), cymbal (2), bell tree (4)
- Marc Quiñones – timbales (2), congas (2), cua (2)
- David Rodriguez – first trumpet solo (2), trumpet (10)
- Ray Vega – second trumpet solo (2), trumpet (5), trumpet solo (5)
- Juliet Hafner – viola (2, 10)
- Stewart Rose – French horn (2)
- Marcia Butler – oboe (2)
- Teana Rodriguez – background vocal (3–4, 6), duo vocal (6)
- Edgar Stewart – background vocal (3)
- David Mann – tenor saxophone (3), baritone saxophone (3)
- Milton Cardona – background vocal (4–5), bongos (8), maracas (8), claves (8), conga (9), guira (9)
- Kevin Harrison – background vocal (4)
- Paul Livant – guitar (4)
- Bill Holloman – tenor saxophone (4, 12), trumpet (13)
- Horace Ott – piano (4, 9)
- Angelo Aponte – background vocal (5)
- Hechter Ubarry – background vocal (5)
- David Davila – background vocal (5)
- Hans Giraldo – background vocal (5)
- Luis Marrero – background vocal (5)
- Angel Ramirez – background vocal (5)
- Robert Vargas – background vocal (5)
- Bernie Minoso – bass guitar (5)
- Edwin Montalvo – congas (5)
- Johnny Andrews – timbales (5)
- Pablo Nuñez – bongos (5), cowbell (5)
- John Walsh – trumpet (5)
- Luis Lopéz – trombone (5)
- Mitch Frohman – tenor saxophone (5)
- Pablo Calogero – baritone saxophone (5), bass clarinet (10)
- Frank Negron – falsetto lead vocals (6)
- Bobby Bright – background vocal (6)
- Sean Pulley – background vocal (6)
- Trent Sutton – background vocal (6)
- Dionte Sutton – background vocal (6)
- Wallace Richardson – guitar (6)
- Paul Griffin – piano (6)
- Jay Leonhart – bass guitar (6)
- Jimmy Sabater – conga (6), cowbell (6)
- Richard Crooks – drums (6)
- Chris Eminizer – tenor saxophone (6)
- Saturnino Laboy – acoustic guitar (8)
- Diomedes Matos – acoustic guitar (8)
- Rubén Rodriguez – bass guitar (8, 10)
- Laura Bontrager – cello (8, 10)
- Harper Simon – guitar (9, 11–12), harmonica (9)
- Arlen Roth – guitar (9, 11–13), acoustic guitar solo (13)
- Tony Garnier – bass guitar (9, 11–12)
- Shannon Ford – drums (9, 11–13)
- Steve Cropper – guitar (10)
- Bob Franceschini – soprano saxophone (10)
- Barry Danielian – flugel (10)
- Ozzie Melendez – trombone (10)
- Krista Feeney – violin (10)
- Paul Peabody – violin (10)
- Vic Miles – interviewer (12)
- Salvador Agron – interview subject (12)
- Sara Ramirez – vocal (13)
- Robby Turner – pedal steel (13)
- Bakithi Kumalo – bass guitar (13)
- Mike Ramos – accordion (13)
- Crusher Bennett – shaker (13)

Technical

- Paul Simon – producer
- Oscar Hernández – associate producer; horn arrangement (5)
- Roy Halee – associate producer; additional production (6, 13), background vocal engineer (1, 3)
- Stanley Silverman – orchestration (2, 10), orchestral conductor (8)
- Oriente Lopez – horn arrangement (10)
- Andy Smith – engineer, mixing
- Bob Ludwig – mastering
- Rob Murphy – second engineer
- Greg Pinto – second engineer
- Ethan Schofer – assistant engineer
- Mark Johnson – assistant engineer
- Pete Matthews – assistant engineer
- Frank Olinsky – design
- Bob Crowley – cover art
- Nitin Vadukul – photo of Paul Simon
- Sigrid Nama – photo of Derek Walcott and Paul Simon

== Charts ==
Chart performance for Songs From The Capeman
Chart (1997)	Peak position
Australian Albums (ARIA)	171
Belgian Albums (Ultratop Flanders)	45
Dutch Albums (Album Top 100)	41
German Albums (Offizielle Top 100)	26
Norwegian Albums (VG-lista)	32
Swedish Albums (Sverigetopplistan)	36
Swiss Albums (Schweizer Hitparade)	49
UK Albums (Official Charts)	83
US Billboard 200	42
