= All Roads Are Made of the Flesh =

Live album by Kip Hanrahan
- Released: March 1995
- Recorded: 1982 – 1994
- Studio: Studio Tracks: RPM Sound Studios, Live Tracks: New York City, Baden-Baden Germany, Copenhagen
- Genre: Jazz
- Length: 45:08
- Label: American Clave
- Producer: Kip Hanrahan

Kip Hanrahan chronology
Exotica (1993)	All Roads Are Made of the Flesh (1995)	A Thousand Nights and a Night (Red Nights) (1996)

All Roads Are Made of the Flesh is a live album by Kip Hanrahan released in March 1995, featuring guests including Jack Bruce, Don Pullen, and Andy Gonzalez. It features tracks recorded live in Nijmegen, Copenhagen, Baden-Baden and New York. "Buddy Boldens Blues" was written by Jelly Roll Morton.

== Critical reception ==
The Lake Geneva Regional News described the first track, "Buddy Bolden's Blues", as "a step into next year".

Writing for the Detroit Free Press, music reviewer Fernando Gonzalez wrote that All Roads Are Made of the Flesh "offers improbable combinations like Jack Bruce rubbing elbows with Charles Neville, Elisee Pyroneau and Giovanni Hidalgo in the song "...at the same time." Musically, All Roads stretches from the intimate version of Jelly Rolly Morton's "Buddy Bolden's Blues" sung by Bruce to the intense R&B-meets-free-jazz-meets-salsa and Cuban "conjunto" of "...at the same time"."

== Track listing ==
No.	Title	Length
1.	"Buddy Bolden's Blues"	9:45
2.	"...At the Same Time as the Subway Train Was Pulling Out of the Station..."	5:18
3.	"The First and Last to Love Me (4, December)"	10:26
4.	"The September Dawn Shows Itself to Elizabeth and Her Lover on East 18th Street in Manhattan"	7:36
5.	"The Same Dawn, at Almost the Exact Same Moment, Actually Smiles at Don in Passaic"	5:04
6.	"Within an Hour, in New Orleans, Charles Knows the Light's in the Room Without Even Opening His Eyes"	0:57
7.	"The First and Last to Love Me (2, October)"	5:57

== Personnel ==
- Don Pullen – organ, piano
- Allen Toussaint – piano
- Charles Neville – tenor saxophone
- Jack Bruce – vocals, bass
- Anthony Carillo – congas
- Milton Cardona – congas
- Richie Flores – congas
- J.T. Lewis – drums (trap drums)
- Robbie Ameen – drums (trap drums)
- Leo Nocentelli – guitar
- Chico Freeman – tenor saxophone
- Chocolate Armenteros – trumpet
- Alfredo Triff – violin
- Wolfgang Puschnig – alto saxophone
- Dino Saluzzi – bandoneon
- Renaud Garcia-Fons – bass
- Michael Riessler – bass clarinet
- Carmen Lundy – vocals
- Andy Gonzalez – bass
- Giovanni Hidalgo – congas
- Jerry Gonzalez – congas
- Willie Green – drums (trap drums)
- Elysee Pyronneau – guitar
- Charles Neville – tenor saxophone
- Steve Swallow – bass
- Ignacio Berroa – drums (trap drums)
- George Adams – tenor saxophone
- Lars Palfig – recording
- Max Federhofer – recording
