= Bemba =

Bemba may refer to:

== Languages and ethnic groups ==
- Bemba language, or Chibemba, a Bantu language spoken in Zambia
- Bemba people, or AbaBemba, of Zambia
- Bemba, a dialect of the Buyu language of the Democratic Republic of the Congo

== People ==
- Jeannot Bemba Saolona (1941–2009), Congolese businessman, father of Jean-Pierre Bemba
- Jean-Pierre Bemba (born 1962), Congolese politician
- Matthieu Bemba (born 1988), Guadeloupean footballer

== Other uses ==
- Bemba (deity), in the traditional religion of the Bambara people of Mali
- Bemba, or bembe, a Caribbean membranophone used in the music of Trinidad and Tobago

== See also ==
- Bembe (disambiguation)
