= Cambucha =

Cambucha (Carmen)

Studio album by Milton Cardona
- Released: 1999
- Recorded: 1999
- Label: American Clave (AMCL 1028)
- Producer: Milton Cardona; Executive Producer: Kip Hanrahan

Cambucha is a studio album by Latin percussion artist Milton Cardona. It was released in 1999.

== Track listing ==
No.	Title	Length
1.	"Prelude to Elegbá"
2.	"Cambucha (Son)"
3.	"Goddess of Sweet Waters (Ochún)"
4.	"Freedom of Expressions (Shekeres)"
5.	"A Kiss (Doo-Wop/A Capella)"
6.	"Obatalá Macho"
7.	"God's Work is Indestructible"
8.	"Playing with Myself (Inner Thoughts)"
9.	"Rumba Soledad"
10.	"Prayer to Eshú"
11.	"Kabiesi (Thunder/Lightning)"
12.	"Malas Palabras"
