= Pablo Zinger =

- Born: June 7, 1956 (age 70)
- Origin: Uruguay
- Genres: Nuevo tango, zarzuela
- Occupations: Conductor, pianist, arranger, writer
- Instrument: Piano
- Years active: 1970s – present

Pablo Zinger is a conductor, pianist, writer, composer, arranger, lecturer and narrator, specializing in the music of Ástor Piazzolla, tango, Spanish zarzuela, and Latin American vocal and instrumental music.

== Biography ==
Pablo Zinger was born in 1956 in Uruguay and has lived in New York City since 1976. He is married to Adriana Sananes. Zinger holds Bachelor of Music and Master of Music degrees from Manhattan School of Music, where he studied piano with Zenon Fishbein.

== Career ==
Zinger has conducted and played with orchestras, singers and chamber groups throughout the Americas and in Spain, Russia, Poland, Slovenia, Japan, Korea, South Africa, Germany and Norway.

In 2009, he accompanied Plácido Domingo singing tangos at Washington's Constitution Hall, narrated Piazzolla's Pueblo Joven at Tokyo's Opera City (2008), played and conducted the Moscow première of Piazzolla's María de Buenos Aires (2006), and conducted the closing of Paquito D'Rivera's Carnegie Hall 50th Anniversary Concert (2005).

In 1987, he was asked by Ástor Piazzolla to serve as musical director for the premiere production of Tango Apasionado at the Westbeth Theater Center. Zinger also played piano in the production and on the Kip Hanrahan recording which followed on the American Clavé label (see Discography).

He tours and records frequently with the Nuevo Tango Zinger Septet (Valencia, Spain). His critically acclaimed CD's include Tango Apasionado with Ástor Piazzolla, Chamber Music from the South and the Grammy nominated The Clarinetist with Paquito D'Rivera and Gustavo Tavares, Las Puertas de la Mañana (songs of Carlos Guastavino), and two albums of Carlos Suriñach’s flamenco-infused music.

He is considered the pre-eminent conductor of zarzuela in the U.S. Since 2004, he has been the musical director of the Zarzuela Series at the National Hispanic Cultural Center, directed by Salomé Martínez-Lutz in Albuquerque, NM.

As a sideline, Zinger has written for The New York Times, Opera News, Guitar Review and Classical Singer, and has lectured for the New York Philharmonic.

He has conducted the Costa Rica National Symphony, Simón Bolívar Orchestra (Venezuela), Maribor Philharmonic (Slovenia), Montevideo Philharmonic and Montevideo Pro Opera (Uruguay) and Bronx Arts Ensemble with Jazz greats Tito Puente, Dave Valentin, Néstor Torres and John Faddis. At New York's Town Hall, he conducted Piazzolla's María de Buenos Aires and Pueblo Joven (U.S. première), Ernesto Lecuona's María la O, Roig's Cecilia Valdés, Moreno Torroba’s Luisa Fernanda and Barbieri's El barberillo de Lavapiés. Other zarzuela credits: Spanish Repertory Theatre (1980–1994), Orlando Opera, Zarzuela Company Domingo-Embil (Mexico), International Zarzuela Festival (El Paso), Jarvis Conservatory (Napa), and Santa Barbara Grand Opera. Zinger's La Verbena de la Paloma (El Paso, '96) was seen nationally on PBS and his Luisa Fernanda (Napa, '97) was issued on CD and DVD.

As musical director of New York's Polish Theatre Institute, Zinger has conducted Polish operas, concerts and cabaret presentations throughout the U.S. and in five tours of Poland.

== Discography ==
- 1987 Rough Dancer and the Cyclical Night (Tango Apasionado), Nonesuch (ASIN: B00004R8RX) - originally issued by American Clavé
- 1993 Las Puertas de la Mañana (songs of Carlos Guastavino) with Ulises Espaillat, tenor, New Albion (ASIN: B000000R3I)
- 1993 Doppio Concertino, (composed by Carlos Suriñach), New World (ASIN: B0000030HJ)
- 1996 Suriñach: Ritmo Jondo, New World (ASIN: B0000030JP)
- 1997 For Winds, Newport Classic (ASIN: B000003W3L)
- 1999 Chamber Music from the South, Mix House (ASIN: B00000JF7H)
- 2002 The Clarinetist, Pimienta (ASIN: B00005K29C)
- 2016 Latin American & Spanish Masterpieces for Flute & Piano, Albany Records (ASIN: B01CPLC0HM)
