= Vertical's Currency =

Studio album by Kip Hanrahan
- Released: 1984
- Genre: Jazz
- Length: 40:03
- Label: American Clave
- Producer: Kip Hanrahan

Kip Hanrahan chronology
Desire Develops an Edge (1983)	Vertical's Currency (1984)	A Few Short Notes for the End Run (1985)

Vertical's Currency is the third studio album by Kip Hanrahan, released in 1984 and featuring Jack Bruce and saxophonist David Murray. It was described by The Boston Globe as "Hanrahans's first attempt at a pop record".

== Critical reception ==
The Boston Globe called it "an honest attempt at formulating his musical collages from jazz to Nuyorican Latin to noise rock and Haitian music within more traditional forms. It might not be revolutionary, but it's still an intelligent, well-crafted work and a cut above standard pop fare.

A 1985 Spin review described it as "Like tangos, like salsa, like bossa, like sambas, with Jack Bruce on vocals and David Murray on tenor. Very tropical and layered with Bruce's Celtic bop vocals and Murray's effervescent and exultant sax."

== Track listing ==
No.	Title	Length
1.	"A Small Map of Heaven"	5:20
2.	"Shadow Song (Mario's In)"	4:03
3.	"Smiles and Grins"	3:09
4.	"Two Heartedly, to the Other Side"	3:02
5.	"Chances Are Good (Baden's Distance)"	5:15
6.	"Make Love 2"	4:25
7.	"One Casual Song (After Another)"	3:14
8.	"Intimate Distances (Jack's Margrit's Natasha)"	2:50
9.	"Describing It to Yourself as Convex"	4:15
10.	"What Do You Think? That This Mountain Was Once Fire?"	1:38
11.	"Dark (Kip's Tune)"	2:52

== Personnel ==
- David Murray – tenor saxophone
- Jack Bruce – vocals, bass, piano
- Steve Swallow – bass
- Peter Scherer – synclavier, organ
- Arto Lindsay – guitar
- Ignacio Berroa – drums
- Milton Cardona – congas, bongos
- Puntilla Orlando Rios – congas, bongos
