= Exotica (Kip Hanrahan album) =

Studio album by Kip Hanrahan
- Released: March 1993
- Recorded: February 1992 – May 1992
- Studio: RPM Sound Studios, Sorcerer Sound
- Genre: Jazz, Fusion, Modern Creative
- Length: 58:16
- Label: American Clave
- Producer: Kip Hanrahan

Kip Hanrahan chronology
Tenderness (1990)	Exotica (1993)	All Roads Are Made of the Flesh (1995)

Exotica is a studio album by Kip Hanrahan released in March 1993, featuring guests including Jack Bruce, Leo Nocentelli, and Milton Cardona. "G-d Is Great" was co-written by Bruce.

== Background ==
When compared with the previous album Tenderness, Exotica was described as "a looser outing; uneven, but flowing with hotter blood".

Hanrahan spoke highly of his time recording with Jack Bruce, saying "with Jack you are spoilt, because you start out with your sketch and finish up with a gorgeous painting".

== Critical reception ==
Music reviewer Jack Burke described Exotica in the Lake Geneva Regional News as "soothing and provocative both, ranging far afield and home again".

== Track listing ==
No.	Title	Length
1.	"You Can Tell a Guy by His Anger"	7:45
2.	"The Last Song"	3:34
3.	"As in Angola (Red Star in the Morning Sky)"	3:35
4.	"Red Star"	6:53
5.	"You Can Tell Someone Who'll Never Fulfill Their Potential by the Way They Measure the Evening"	1:18
6.	"What We Learned That Night in Vera Cruz and How We Applied It"	2:36
7.	"G-d Is Great"	10:34
8.	"As in the Bronx (You Can Tell Where Someone Comes From by What They Laugh At)"	4:27
9.	"You Can Tell a Moment of Clarity by the Digital Trace It Leaves"	6:01
10.	"As in the Red Morning"	8:00
11.	"The Last Song on the Album"	3:25
