= Milonga Del Angel =

Composition by Astor Piazzolla

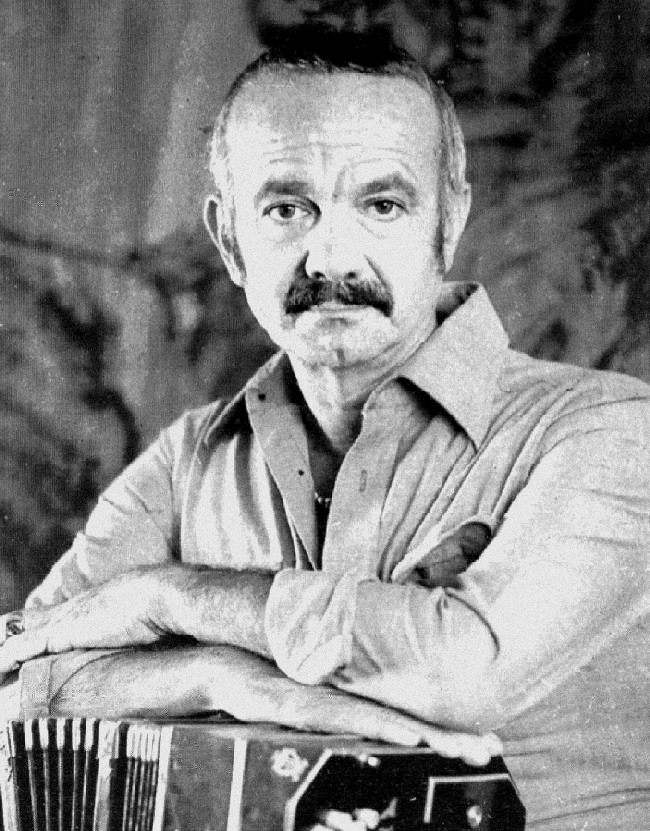
Ástor Piazzolla in 1971

Milonga del Ángel is a composition of Ástor Piazzolla. It's the second part of the Angel Series, a composition from 1965. He recorded it live in 1965, and then on his 1986 album Tango: Zero Hour.

It's also the name of the 1993 album which contains the following songs:

- Biyuya
- Revirado
- Caliente
- Lunfardo
- Decarissimo
- Milonga del Ángel
- Muerte del Ángel
- Resurreccion del Ángel
- Tristezas de un Doble A
- Escualo
