= Bembe =

Bembe may refer to:

== Music ==
- Bembé (rhythm), in African and Cuban music
- Bembe (West African drumming), in Yoruba music
- Bembe (membranophone), or bemba, a Trinidadian drum
- Bembé (album), by Milton Cardona, 1986

== Other uses ==
- Bembe people, an ethnic group in central Africa
- António Bento Bembe (fl. from 2004), Angolan general and politician
- Bembe language (Ibembe), spoken by the Bembe people of the Democratic Republic of the Congo and western Tanzania
- Bembe language (Kibembe), spoken in the Republic of the Congo
- Beembe tribe (Kongo), of the Republic of the Congo
- Bembe, Angola, a town and municipality in Uíge Province in Angola

== See also ==
- Bemba language, spoken in Zambia by the Bemba people
