= Bembé (album) =

Bembé A recording of the songs and rhythms of ten Orishas (Deities) of Santeria in New York.

Studio album by Milton Cardona
- Released: 1986
- Recorded: 1985
- Label: American Clave (AMCL 1004)
- Producer: Kip Hanrahan

Bembé is a headway voice/percussion album by Milton Cardona. The album contains a recording by Kip Hanrahan of Eya Aranla performing a full Santería ceremony.

== Critical reception ==
The New York Times described the album as "an album with the crisp detail of a pop studio recording."

== Track listing ==
No.	Title	Length
1.	"Salute to Elegua"	1:09
2.	"Elegua"	3:54
3.	"Ogu'n"	3:03
4.	"Ochosi"	2:26
5.	"Ebioso"	2:29
6.	"Babalu Aye"	3:52
7.	"Obatala"	4:28
8.	"Chango"	5:13
9.	"Yemaya"	5:51
10.	"Ochu'n"	4:12
11.	"Odudua"	2:31
12.	"Elegua"	2:03
