= Salvador Agron =

Puerto Rican gang member

- Born: April 24, 1943; Mayagüez, Puerto Rico
- Died: April 22, 1986 (aged 42); New York City, New York, United States
- Status: Deceased
- Conviction: First degree murder (2 counts)
- Penalty: Death; commuted to life imprisonment

Salvador Agron (Note: The correct spelling of his surname in Spanish is Agrón. But the biography by Jacoby, his personal friend, uses the americanized spelling Agron exclusively throughout. The book contains numerous examples of personal correspondence from its subject, and he signs himself Agron, even when writing in Spanish, for example, "Tu amigo y hermano, Salvador Agron #16846" (Jacoby, p. 70). Reports of his arrest use the conventional americanized spelling. He was described as "Salvador Agron, the Cape Man" in the New York Herald Tribune on September 3, 1959 (reprinted in Jacoby, p. 181).) (April 24, 1943 – April 22, 1986), a.k.a. "The Capeman", was a Puerto Rican gang member who murdered two teenagers in a Hell's Kitchen park in 1959. Agron mistook the teenagers for members of a rival gang called the Norsemen, who were expected to show up for a street fight. Agron is the subject of the musical The Capeman by Paul Simon.

== Early years ==
Agron was born in the city of Mayagüez, on the western coast of Puerto Rico. When he was young, his parents divorced. His mother retained custody of Salvador and his sister Aurea, and earned a living working at a local convent. According to Agron, he and his sister were mistreated by the nuns. His mother met and married a Pentecostal minister, and the family moved to New York City.

The relationship between Agron and his stepfather was difficult, and he asked his mother to send him back to Puerto Rico to live with his father. Agron returned to Puerto Rico, by which time his father had remarried. As a teenager Agron discovered the body of his stepmother, who had died of suicide by hanging. Agron began to get into trouble, and was sent to the Industrial School of Mayagüez.

== The Capeman ==
Agron's father sent him back to his mother in New York. In 1958 he became a member of teenage Puerto Rican street gang the Mau Maus, based in the Fort Greene neighborhood of Brooklyn. Agron later joined another gang called the Vampires after meeting Tony Hernandez, (Note: The correct spelling of his surname in Spanish is Hernández. The biography by Jacoby uses the americanized spelling Hernandez (Jacoby, p. 182).) the gang's president. On August 29, 1959, the Vampires were on their way to "rumble" with the Norsemen, a gang composed mostly of Irish Americans based in Hell's Kitchen. When the Vampires arrived at the playground where the fight was to take place, they mistook a group of unrelated teenagers for members of the Norsemen. After some of the youths made fun of Agron's costume, he stabbed two of the teenagers to death and fled the scene. The victims were Anthony Krzesinski and Robert Young, Jr.

Agron was dubbed "The Capeman" by newspapers because he wore a black cape with red lining during the fight. After Agron was captured, he was quoted as saying "I don't care if I burn – my mother can watch me," and that he had killed because he "felt like it."

== Incarceration ==
After a 12-week trial, Agron was convicted on two counts of first degree murder, and was sentenced to death on October 20, 1960. His sentence made him the youngest man in history to sit on New York's death row. While many New Yorkers were outraged about the killings, others, like former First Lady Eleanor Roosevelt, campaigned for leniency. The mother of victim Anthony Krzesinki vowed retribution in 1961, but the father of Robert Young, Jr. supported commutation. In 1962, one week before his scheduled execution in the electric chair at Sing Sing, Agron's sentence was commuted to life in prison by Governor Nelson Rockefeller.

During his incarceration, Agron learned to read and write, and earned his high school equivalency diploma. He wrote poems about his life and street life, including "The Political Identity of Salvador Agron; Travel Log of Thirty-Four Years", "Uhuru Sasa! (A Freedom Call)", and "Justice, Law and Order", which were published by some newspapers. He later earned his Bachelor of Arts degree in sociology and philosophy from the State University of New York at New Paltz.

== Escape and release from prison ==
The Committee to Free Salvador Agron successfully campaigned Governor Hugh Carey to further reduce Agron's sentence in December 1976, making him eligible for release in 1977. During the interim, Agron was transferred to Fishkill Correctional Facility in order to take part in an educational release program. He would attend classes at SUNY New Paltz during the day and return to prison at night. In April 1977, Agron took flight and absconded to Phoenix, Arizona. He was captured there two weeks later and returned to New York.

Agron was put on trial for his escape in November 1977. His defense was led by lawyer William Kunstler. Joel Kovel appeared as an expert witness, and testified that the contradictory nature of the educational release program, harassment suffered at Fishkill Correctional Facility and his long imprisonment had driven Agron into a pre-psychotic state at the time of his escape. The jury found Agron "not guilty by reason of mental disease or defect." Agron was released from prison on November 1, 1979.

== Later years and death ==
In 1979, Agron brought a civil suit against Titus Productions, claiming that the company had wrongfully paid $2,500 owed him for the rights to his life story to the New York State Crime Victims Compensation Board. The television film Death Penalty aired on January 22, 1980.

After his release, Agron began working as a youth counselor, and spoke out against gang violence. On April 16, 1986, he was admitted to a Bronx hospital with pneumonia and internal bleeding. He died six days later at age 42, two days before his 43rd birthday.

== In popular culture ==
- Conversations with the Capeman: The Untold Story of Salvador Agron was written by Richard Jacoby, with an introduction by Hubert Selby, Jr.
- The Capeman, a Broadway musical written by Paul Simon and Derek Walcott, is based on the life of Agron. The play opened at the Marquis Theatre in 1998.
- The character of Anthony "Batman" Aposto in the 1961 film The Young Savages is loosely based upon Agron and his tendency to wear capes.
- In 2009, Puerto Rican singer Obie Bermúdez, together with Danny Rivera, Ray de la Paz, Claudette Sierra and Frankie Negrón, participated in a performance of Songs of the Capeman, based on Paul Simon's play, under the direction of Oscar Hernández and his Spanish Harlem Orquestra.

== Bibliography ==
- Agron, Salvador, Rubinstein, Annette T., and Kresky, Harry. Salvador Agron: Puerto Rican, Prisoner, Poet, Charter Group for a Pledge of Conscience, 1978.
- Jacoby, Richard. Conversations with the Capeman: The Untold Story of Salvador Agron, University of Wisconsin Press: Madison, 2004.

== See also ==
- List of Puerto Ricans
