= Tango: Zero Hour =

Studio album by Ástor Piazzolla
- Released: September 1986
- Recorded: May 1986
- Studio: Sound Ideas, New York City
- Genre: Nuevo tango
- Length: 46:07
- Label: American Clavé, Nonesuch
- Producer: Kip Hanrahan

Professional ratings
Review scores
Source	Rating
AllMusic	link
Robert Christgau	A−

Tango: Zero Hour (Nuevo Tango: Hora Zero in Spanish) is an album by Ástor Piazzolla and his Quinteto Nuevo Tango (in English: New Tango Quintet, often loosely referred to as his second quintet). It was released in September 1986 on American Clavé, and re-released on Pangaea Records in 1988.

Piazzolla considered this his greatest album. Rolling Stone commented on the Pangaea reissue of the album, comparing Piazzolla's fusion of form, improvisation, and dynamics to contemporary classical music, jazz, and rock & roll, respectively. Robert Christgau of The Village Voice also commented on Piazzolla's fusion of classical and jazz music.

== Track listing ==
All tracks written by Astor Piazzolla.

1. "Tanguedia III" – 4:39
2. "Milonga del ángel" – 6:31
3. "Concierto para quinteto" – 9:06
4. "Milonga loca" – 3:09
5. "Michelangelo '70" – 2:52
6. "Contrabajissimo" – 10:19
7. "Mumuki" – 9:33

== Musicians ==
- Ástor Piazzolla – bandoneon, arranger
- Hector Console – bass
- Horacio Malvicino – guitar
- Fernando Suarez Paz – violin
- Pablo Ziegler – piano

=== Technical personnel ===
- Greg Calbi – Mastering
- Jon Fausty – Engineer, mixing
- Kip Hanrahan – Producer, engineer
- Nancy Hanrahan – Associate producer
- Scott Marcus – Executive producer
- Charles Reilly – Photography
- Shawna Stobie – Assistant engineer, mixing assistant
