= The Capeman =

1998 American musical

- Original Broadway poster
- Music: Paul Simon
- Lyrics: Paul Simon; Derek Walcott
- Book: Paul Simon; Derek Walcott
- Basis: The life of Salvador Agrón
- Productions: 1998 Broadway; 2010 Delacorte Theater

The Capeman is a musical play with music by Paul Simon and book and lyrics by Simon and Derek Walcott based on the life of convicted murderer Salvador Agrón. The play opened at the Marquis Theatre in 1998 to poor reviews and ran for 68 performances. A blend of doo-wop, gospel, and Latin music, it received Tony Award nominations for Best Original Score, Best Orchestrations and Best Scenic Design. Renoly Santiago received a Drama Desk nomination for Outstanding Featured Performer in a Musical. Ednita Nazario won the Theater World Award for her performance.

In 2008, Simon and the Spanish Harlem Orchestra performed The Capeman at the Brooklyn Academy of Music with some of the original cast and other well-known artists. Simon also devoted a section of his two-night performances at the Beacon Theatre to The Capeman. The NY Public Theater presented a concert production of the musical in the Summer of 2010 at Central Park's Delacorte Theater, directed by Diane Paulus.

== Production ==
Paul Simon began working on The Capeman in 1988. The early development was aided by Simon's friend Carlos Ortiz, who helped Simon locate and translate source material. Simon and Ortiz met with people who had known Agron in prison, and visited Esmeralda Agron in Puerto Rico. In the first minutes of their meeting, Agron described a dream of her son entering heaven, which would become the song "Esmeralda's Dream". Ortiz also introduced Simon to several Latin musicians, and before long Simon had written "Born in Puerto Rico", one of the show's centerpiece songs.

Simon enlisted the help of Derek Walcott, a Nobel Prize–winning author and poet from the West Indies. Their working relationship was awkward at first: Simon had become unused to this type of creative collaboration, and Walcott initially disliked the show's main character. Simon insisted that the music be written first, with the lyrics set to the songs. Eventually the two completed the play, with music composed by Simon and lyrics "about 50–50 Simon–Walcott".

Simon assembled a band and spent almost five years and $1 million recording the songs. This was an unorthodox approach to constructing a Broadway show. Typically a show's writer delivers a script and score to a director, who assembles and creates the final production. Simon wanted to retain full artistic control over the show through its entire production. Simon soon encountered resistance for refusing to follow custom in the Broadway industry.

Simon was often cited as being disdainful of Broadway, and said in interviews that he hoped to reinvigorate what he saw as a stale musical form. Broadway music, he said, had "ended up in a weird cul de sac – probably because it was never energized by rock and roll." Theatre producer Rocco Landesman responded to Simon's statements: "The idea that you can at a strike rewrite an art form is a little presumptuous. I can't say the people in the theater community were rooting for Paul Simon after all the things he said about Broadway."

In 2011, Simon admitted that his inexperience had been a problem, saying:

It's not that easy to write for the theater for the first time...You really need a guide. For people coming out of popular music, writing songs that further the plot is different from writing whatever is on your mind. It's a different discipline.

Simon assembled a team of producers and financiers, including James L. Nederlander and Brad Grey. The team raised and contributed several million dollars, but none had experience producing a Broadway show.

Eventually, the production cost an estimated $11 million, at the time a very high budget for a Broadway show. Some of the high budget was due to Simon's insistence that his musicians participate in all rehearsals with the actors, not a typical practice in Broadway productions.

In another unorthodox move, Simon hired the director as the last member of the creative team. Simon first offered the job to Mark Morris, who agreed to be the show's choreographer instead. Simon hired set designer Bob Crowley (who would be nominated for Tony Award for his sets in The Capeman), and cast Ruben Blades and Marc Anthony in the title roles. Only after these decisions did he hire Susana Tubert as the director.

During the last 18 months before its opening, three different directors worked on the musical: Tubert, Eric Simonson, and Mark Morris, the choreographer, who was the final credited director. The show's eventual release date was delayed by last-minute editing and restructuring. Derek Walcott, the show's book writer, effectively walked out of the production after resisting rewrites. Blades, in particular, had very strong opinions about Walcott's book:

I admire him deeply, he is a Nobel Laureate, but there are cultural nuances that are lost in the translation that Walcott was simply unable to catch. I also had my struggles with Simon, telling him that a particular line or two would have never come out of a Latino's mouth if the play is to be believable.

Significant work was done by director Jerry Zaks, hired in an "unofficial capacity" to help Morris. Zaks said, "I've done about as much as I can with what's there."

The production gave preview performances in New York while the rewriting was taking place. This put the cast in the difficult position of performing the original version of the show each night, while in the afternoons they learned and rehearsed rewritten versions.

The show opened at the Marquis Theatre on January 29, 1998, and suffered from very poor reviews from the mainstream press. Within a week, the show's producers discussed their strategy for saving the production, and vowed to keep the show open at least until the Tony Award nominations in May.

The show closed after only 68 performances on March 28. After the show's closing was announced, Paul Simon issued a statement: "What I enjoyed the most, apart from the creative process, was the intensity with which the audience, in particular the Latino audience, responded to the play."

== Selected personnel for the Broadway production ==
- Paul Simon: Music, book and lyrics
- Derek Walcott: Book and lyrics
- Mark Morris: Director and choreographer
- Bob Crowley: Sets and costumes
- Oscar Hernández: Musical director
- Wendall K. Harrington:Projection Designer
- Natasha Katz: Lighting Designer

=== Original cast ===
- Marc Anthony – Young Salvador Agron
- Ruben Blades – Adult Salvador Agron
- Renoly Santiago – Tony Hernandez
- Ednita Nazario – Esmeralda Agron
- Michelle Rios – Aurea Agron
- Élan Luz Rivera – Cookie
- Edwin Lugo – Babu Charlie Cruz
- Sara Ramirez – Wahzinak
- Julio Monge - Carlos Apache
- Sophia Salguero - Bernadette

== Reception ==
Initial mainstream press reviews of The Capeman were overwhelmingly negative, though most had some praise for Simon's music. Time Magazine referred to Capeman as "one of the biggest flops in Broadway history".

Ben Brantley, reviewer for the New York Times, wrote a very negative review, calling the show a "sad, benumbed spectacle" which was "unparalleled in its wholesale squandering of illustrious talents". He praised Simon's Songs from The Capeman album, but said that the translation to stage was lacking: "Everything in the music melts together; practically nothing that's said, done and shown on the stage seems to connect with anything else." Brantley admired Anthony and Blades' talents, but criticized the writing of their character, saying that Anthony "has been given no proper role to play". He wrote that the historical footage of Agron stole the show, especially young Sal's media statements that his mother could watch him burn. "Nothing that Mr. Anthony or Mr. Blades does in The Capeman begins to approach the disturbing complexity of that image." However, The Capeman was included in the New York Times year-end Top Ten list for music in theater.

There was a minority that appreciated the play, but these were generally outside the mainstream. An article in The Progressive suggests cultural factors that led to the bad reviews, citing mainstream backlash against Simon's disparagement of the Broadway system, and discomfort with racial and ethnic themes in the Broadway core audience. The article points out that reviews were generally positive among two groups: out-of-town critics and non-white New York critics.

== Recordings ==
"Cover" for digital release of The Capeman (Original Broadway Cast Recording)

In 1997 (before the show's premiere), Simon released a studio album called Songs from The Capeman, featuring 13 songs from the show performed by Simon with appearances from some of the original cast. Compared to Simon's other studio recordings, the album was not a success, peaking at position 42 of the Billboard 200 chart, the lowest of his career. Soon after, Puerto Rican singer Danny Rivera included a Spanish-language version of "Born in Puerto Rico" as part of his live recording, En Vivo desde Carnegie Hall. In the recording, Rivera can be heard acknowledging Simon's presence in the audience, and thanking him for the song on behalf of all Puerto Ricans.

An original Broadway cast recording was produced featuring 21 tracks, but its release was postponed after the show's failure. The record was eventually released in 2006 at the iTunes Store as The Capeman (Original Broadway Cast Recording). All vocals on this release were performed by the original cast, with an appearance by Paul Simon on "Trailways Bus".

== The Capeman after Broadway ==
The Capeman was not performed in its original form after its 68-show original Broadway run. Shortly after the show's closure there were discussions of a Songs of The Capeman national concert tour, but these plans were abandoned.

Just days after the show's Broadway premiere, Variety journalist Greg Evans suggested that the doomed show would work well as a concert of songs. He wrote, "Years from now, when some savvy producer is scouting old theater material for a scaled-down concert staging, The Capeman should be first on his list."

In 2008, Joseph Melillo, director of the Brooklyn Academy of Music, produced a stage show called Songs from the Capeman using Paul Simon's Capeman music without the narrative dramatic elements of the show. Melillo said, "I wanted to help Paul, to get this demon out of him and onto the stage, where we could say, 'Look everyone, this is great music.'"

Melillo's production featured the Spanish Harlem Orchestra led by Oscar Hernández, original music director for the Broadway Capeman.

Paul Simon appeared, to sing "Trailways Bus", one of the songs from the show, and finished the evening with a performance of his 1980 Latin-themed single "Late in the Evening".

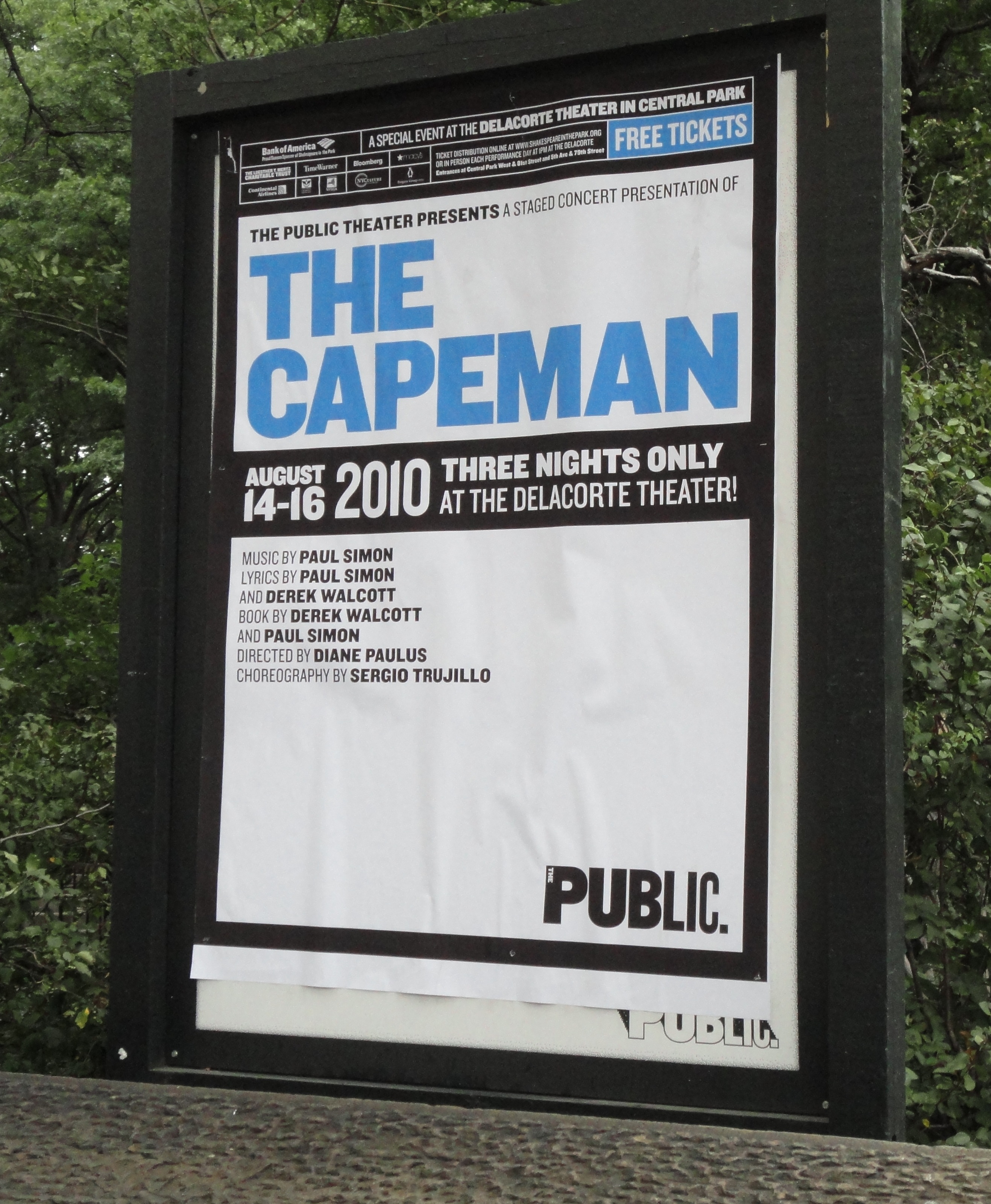
Poster for the 2010 production of The Capeman in Central Park

In August 2010 a heavily revised production of The Capeman ran three shows at Central Park's Delacorte Theater, directed by Diane Paulus. The production featured Obie Bermúdez as The Umbrella Man and a musical number by Danny Rivera. This version was substantially stripped down, with a running time of only about 90 minutes (compared to the original production's three hours). The new version increased the focus on Agron's mother, dropped some characters and subplots, used more choreography, and had no sets. The media was instructed not to write reviews of the show, which was officially described as a work in progress, with Public Theater artistic director Oskar Eustis calling it "just a sketch" of full reconception of the show. Even so, Ben Brantley of the New York Times, who said the original Broadway production was "like watching a mortally wounded animal", gave a positive review, focusing on the organic staging outdoors on a rainy night in Central Park.
