= Marcia Butler =

American writer (born 1955)

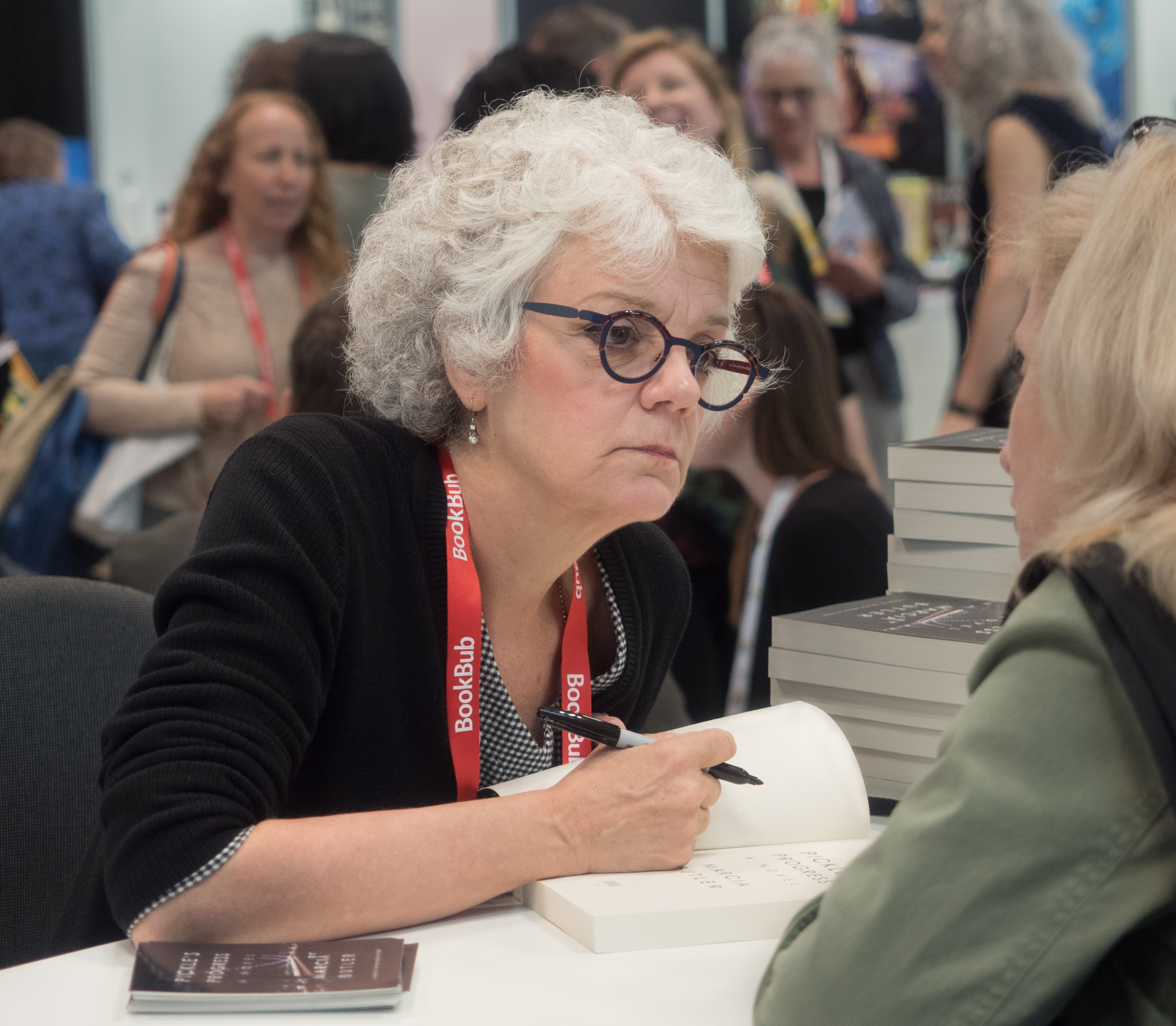
- Butler at BookExpo America in 2019
- Born: January 5, 1955 (age 71)
- Education: Mannes School of Music

Marcia Butler (born January 5, 1955) is an American writer. She is the author of the nationally acclaimed memoir The Skin Above My Knee (Little Brown, 2017). Prior to her writing career, she was a professional oboist in New York City for 28 years until her retirement in 2008.

== Early life and education ==
Butler grew up in Massachusetts and New York. Having begun her oboe training in junior high school, she attended Mannes School of Music on a full scholarship.

== Music ==
Since 1980, Butler performed as principal oboist and soloist on many New York and international stages, receiving acclaim from the New York Times as a "first-rate artist". She performed and recorded over 100 works by living composers, including dozens of New York and world premières.

Her collaborators include pianist Andre Watts, composer and pianist Keith Jarrett and soprano Dawn Upshaw. She was awarded a grant for solo recital at the Weill Recital Hall of Carnegie Hall by the League of Composers/International Society of Contemporary Music. She was the only American to be invited to perform Elliot Carter's Oboe Concerto. She has served on the musical faculty of Columbia University.

== Interior Design ==
Changing careers, Butler started her interior design firm in 2002, serving over a hundred private clients across New York City, New England and Florida. In the coming years, her design work was featured in various shelter magazines and web publications, including Design Bureau Magazine, Apartment Therapy’s The Kitchn, Gourmet Business Magazine, and Home & Textiles Today. She received of the Design Excellence Award from the International Interior Design Association in 2005.

== Writing ==
In 2016, Butler retired from design and transitioned into a writing career. Her debut memoir The Skin Above My Knee was published by Little, Brown and Company in 2017. One of The Washington Post's "37 Books We've Loved So Far in 2017," the memoir chronicles her difficult childhood with a distant mother and abusive father, musical education, and coming-of-age as a musician in New York City. She has published essays on themes of abuse, trauma, relationships and music on Psychology Today, Literary Hub, Ducts and Pank Magazine. Butler is also a breast cancer survivor and has written about her experience of illness and treatment.

Butler was a Writer-in-Residence through Aspen Words and the Catto Shaw Foundation in 2015.

Collaborating with artists and writers such as Nancy Zafris, Butler continues to write and speak about music, writing and creativity across the different disciplines. She lives in New York City and is currently working on a book of fiction.
