= Andy González (musician) =

Puerto Rican Latin jazz bassist (1951–2020)

Background information
- Born: January 1, 1951; Manhattan, New York City, New York, U.S.
- Died: April 9, 2020 (aged 69) The Bronx, New York, U.S.
- Genres: Afro-Cuban jazz, salsa, son cubano, boogaloo, pachanga
- Occupation: Musician
- Instrument: bass
- Years active: 1968-2020
- Labels: Tico, Fania, Columbia Records, Truth Revolution Records

Andy González (January 1, 1951 – April 9, 2020) was a jazz double bassist of Puerto Rican descent recognized as was one of the innovators of Latin Jazz. González was a versatile player, as well as an arranger, composer, music historian and producer of other musicians' records. He embraced African, Cuban and Puerto Rican styles, various strains of jazz and other influences, often merging them into something fresh. Gary W. Kennedy and Barry Kernfeld wrote in Grove Music Online, "González played a solid-bodied, upright electric double bass (baby bass) and is considered to be one of the pre-eminent bass players of his generation in Afro-Cuban music within the USA. As a freelance he made several hundred recordings of Latin music."

== Early life and education ==
The son of Geraldo González and Julia González (née Toyos), Andy González was born in Manhattan on January 1, 1951. He grew up in a musical family in The Bronx. His grandfather was a guitar player and his father was a singer in Latin bands. Trumpeter and percussionist Jerry González was his older brother by eighteen months. Both he and his brother received their early musical training from their father. Andy played violin in grammar school and later started studying the double bass at about the age of 10.

González took lessons with jazz bassist Steve Swallow from 5th to 8th grade; a teacher who inspired his enthusiasm for the music of Pablo Casals and Scott LaFaro. To prepare for his audition to the High School of Music & Art (HSMA), Swallow transcribed the second movement of Bach's Cello Suite No. 2 in D minor, BWV 1008 for González to play as his audition piece. He studied at the HSMA for his entire high school education. There he played in school music ensembles with other future professional musicians; among them Mongo Santamaria's son, Monguito, Jose Mangual Jr., Rene Mcclean, Onaje Allen Gumbs, Stafford Osborne, Nelson Samafiego, a Puerto Rican alto saxophonist, DJ Cousin Brucie, Eric Bibb (son of Leo Bibb), Wilbur Bascomb(son of Ted Bascomb, bassist for Erskine Hawkins), and Allison Dean. Singer-songwriter Janis Ian was in his homeroom and dropped out sophomore year just after recording "Society's Child".

== Career ==
González began his career while a HSMA student playing in a salsa band led by future NEA Jazz Master Ray Barretto in the late 1960s. The group played in the Cuban conjunto style, and Barretto purposefully led the group in a jazz combo approach in which all of the players had turns as a featured soloist. González left this group in 1970 to join Dizzy Gillespie's band but subsequently returned to Barretto's band for a period before working in Eddie Palmieri's band from 1972 to 1974.

During his early career, Andy and his brother Jerry began organizing jam sessions in the basement of the González family's home which experimented with blending Afro-Cuban jazz with newer improvisational jazz styles. These sessions evolved into the founding of the Grupo Folklórico y Experímental Nuevayorquíno (GFEN) sometime in the 1970s. The GFEN released two albums on Salsoul Records, Concepts in Unity (1975) and Lo Dice Todo (1977). The band members on these albums included Frankie Rodríguez, Milton Cardona, Gene Golden, Carlos Mestre, Nelson González, Manny Oquendo, Oscar Hernández, José Rodríguez, Néstor Torres, Gonzalo Fernández, Alfredo "Chocolate" Armenteros, Willy García, Heny Álvarez, Virgilio Martí, Marcelino Guerra, Rubén Blades, Orlando "Puntilla" Ríos, and Julito Collazo. Many years later the group (with a different lineup of musicians), recorded a third and final album, Homenaje a Arsenio (2011).

With Manny Oquendo, González co-founded and co-led the band Conjunto Libre (a band that mixed salsa and jazz) in 1974. Sidemen in this group included his brother Jerry, flautist Dave Valentin, trombonist Steve Turre, and saxophonist Ronnie Cuber. In 1980 Andy joined The Fort Apache band, a group established earlier by his brother Jerry. The brothers co-led this band until 2018. The group's name was taken from the nickname for a Bronx police precinct house. He maintained concurrent membership in the Conjunto Libre and The Fort Apache bands for many years.

González also worked with Tito Puente, Eddie Palmieri, Ray Barreto, and Mongo Santamaria. Health problems resulting from diabetes caused intermittent interruptions to his performance career starting in 2004. In 2016, at the age of 65, Gonzalez released his first album under his own name and leadership, Entre Colegas. The recording featured a tribute to the well-known Cuban bassist Israel Lopez "Cachao". Entre Colegas was nominated for a Grammy Award for Best Latin Jazz album.

Bobby Sanabria stated the following, "González's unique ability to play creatively within the confines of the tumbao — the repetitive patterns played by bass, piano, guitar, tres and cuatro in Cuban and Puerto Rican music — led him to be called for literally hundreds of recording sessions. But he was not limited to salsa-based dates, as he would be called upon by artists including David Byrne, Kip Hanrahan, Dizzy Gillespie and Astor Piazzolla for his expertise on both acoustic and baby bass."

In addition to his work as a musician, González was a member of the faculty in the Jazz and Contemporary Music Program of the Mannes School of Music at The New School for Social Research where he began working in 1996.

== Death ==
González died from pneumonia and complications of diabetes in the Bronx on April 9, 2020.

== Selected discography ==
- Conjunto Egrem – Tu Dices / Solamente Tuyo (Egrem 1975)
- Concepts in Unity (1975)
- Lo Dice Todo (1976)
- Michael Manring, Andy Gonzalez, Francis Rocco Prestia & Victor Wooten – Bass Day '98 (Hudson Music, 1999)
- Bob Mintzer, Giovanni Hidalgo, Andy Gonzalez, David Chesky, Randy Brecker – The Body Acoustic (2004)
- Michael Simon (6) Featuring Marlon Simon, Andy Gonzalez, Edward Simon – New York Encounter (Fresh Sound New Talent, 2009)
- Homenaje a Arsenio (2011)
- Entre Colegas (Truth Revolution Records, 2016)

== See also ==
- Salsa
- Charanga (Cuba)
- Afro-Cuban jazz
