= Ignacio Berroa =

Cuban jazz drummer (born 1953)

Ignacio Berroa (born July 8, 1953, in Havana, Cuba) is a jazz drummer.

In 1980 Berroa left his country during the Mariel Boatlift, moved to New York and joined Dizzy Gillespie’s quartet in 1981, becoming the drummer of the band Gillespie formed until his death in 1993.

Berroa is known for his prowess in jazz drumming and is recognized by some as one of the greatest jazz drummers of the modern era. Jazz legend Dizzy Gillespie best defined Berroa as: "... the only Latin drummer in the world in the history of American music that intimately knows both worlds: his native Afro-Cuban music as well as Jazz..."

As an educator Berroa has conducted clinics and master classes all over the world. He also has created a video-teaching presentation "Afro-Cuban Jazz and Beyond", an overview of the development of Afro-Cuban music and its influence in jazz. As an author he made his mark with the instructional video: Mastering the Art of Afro – Cuban Drumming as well as the books: Groovin’ in Clave and A New Way of Groovin’.

His first album as a leader, Codes, released under Blue Note Records, was nominated for a Grammy in 2006. Codes also won a Danish Music Award in 2007 as best International Jazz Album. He was honored by inclusion in the 2011 Blue Note and Modern Drummer Release titled "Jazz Drumming Legends". His album Heritage and Passion was recorded on 2014.

Berroa has recorded and played with musicians of the stature of McCoy Tyner, Chick Corea, Wynton Marsalis, Freddie Hubbard, Jackie McLean, Michael Brecker, Milt Jackson, Jaco Pastorius, Ron Carter, Charlie Haden, Tito Puente, Mario Bauzá, Gonzalo Rubalcaba, Gilberto Gil, Ivan Lins, Joao Bosco, Lenny Andrade, the Lincoln Center Orchestra, WDR Big Band and the BBC Big Band.

== Discography ==
=== As leader ===
- Codes (Blue Note, 2006)
- Heritage and Passion (2014)
- Straight Ahead from Havana (Codes Drum Music, 2017)

=== As sideman ===
With Dizzy Gillespie

- 1989 Live at the Royal Festival Hall 1989
- 1989 Symphony Sessions
- 1991 A Night in Tunisia
- 1996 Live at the Royal Festival Hall 1987
- 1997 Dizzy's 80th Birthday Party
- 1999 Dizzy's World

With Charlie Haden

- 2001 Nocturne
- 2004 Land of the Sun

With Paul Haines

- 1994 Darn It!
- 1994 Poems by Paul Haines Musics by Many

With Kip Hanrahan

- 1982 Coup de Tête
- 1982 Desire Develops an Edge
- 1985 A Few Short Notes from the End Run
- 1985 Vertical's Currency
- 1988 Conjure: Cab Calloway Stands in for the Moon
- 1988 Days and Nights of Blue Luck Inverted
- 1990 Tenderness
- 1995 All Roads Are Made of the Flesh

With Tito Puente

- 1992 Live at the Village Gate
- 1993 In Session
- 2002 Live at the Playboy Jazz Festival

With Paquito D'Rivera

- 1986 Manhattan Burn
- 1994 Taste of Paquito

With Claudio Roditi

- 1989 Slow Fire
- 1996 Jazz Turns Samba

With Silvio Rodríguez

- 1975 Dias y Flores
- 1988 Dias Y Flores: Song of the Nueva Trova Cubana
- 2000 Arboles

With Gonzalo Rubalcaba

- 1999 Inner Voyage
- 2001 Supernova
- 2004 Paseo

With Hilton Ruiz

- 1986 Something Grand
- 1992 Manhattan Mambo
- 1993 Heroes
- 1995 Hands On Percussion
- 1997 Island Eyes

With Steve Turre

- 1993 Sanctified Shells
- Rainbow People (HighNote, 2008)

With McCoy Tyner

- 1981 13th House
- 1982 La Leyenda de La Hora
- 1999 McCoy Tyner and the Latin All-Stars
- 2007 Afro Blue

With others

- 1984 Into Somewhere, Don Lanphere
- 1984 Masterpiece, Patato Valdes
- 1986 Music World, Jamaaladeen Tacuma
- 1987 Arawe, Daniel Ponce
- 1993 Amaneciendo en Ti, Lourdes Robles
- 1993 The Journey, Danilo Pérez
- 1993 Worldwide, Giovanni Hidalgo
- 1995 Intersection, Gary Campbell
- 1996 El Commandante, Mario Rivera
- 1996 Nazca Lines, Richie Zellon
- 1997 Into the Light, Andres Boiarsky
- 1998 Dawn of a New Day, Mike Longo
- 1999 An Answer to Your Silence, Luciana Souza
- 1999 Latin Jazz Suite, Lalo Schifrin
- 2004 AfroCuban Jazz, Mario Bauzá
- 2009 Te Acuerdas, Francisco Céspedes
- 2012 The Infancia Project, Luis Perdomo
- 2015 New York City Sessions Dave Bass
