= Mario Rivera (musician) =

- Born: Mario Antonio Rivera Manzanillo; July 22, 1939; Santo Domingo, Dominican Republic
- Died: August 10, 2007 (aged 68) New York City
- Genres: Latin jazz
- Occupation: Musician
- Instrument: Saxophone
- Years active: 1960–2000

Mario Rivera (July 22, 1939 - August 10, 2007) was a Latin jazz saxophonist from the Dominican Republic. Besides saxophone, Rivera played trumpet, flute, piano, vibraphone, congas, and drums.

== Career ==
When Rivera was 22, he moved to New York City from the Dominican Republic and accompanied singer Joe Valle. He spent two years with bandleader Tito Rodríguez. During his career he worked with Mongo Santamaria, Eddie Palmieri, and Machito. In 1988 he became a member of the United Nations Orchestra led by Dizzy Gillespie. He was also a member of the Afro-Cuban Jazz Band led by Chico O'Farrill. From the 1970s to the 1990s he worked with Tito Puente. Both appeared in the films Calle 54 and The Mambo Kings. His only solo album, El Commandante, was released in 1996. Rivera died of cancer on August 10, 2007.

== Discography ==
=== As leader ===
- El Comandante ...The Merengue (Groovin' High, 1994)

=== As sideman ===
With Willie Colon

- The Good, the Bad, the Ugly (Fania, 1975)
- Solo (Fania, 1979)

With Cheo Feliciano

- The Singer (Vaya 1976)
- Mi Tierra y Yo (Vaya 1977)

With Dizzy Gillespie

- Afro-Cuban Jazz Moods with Machito (Pablo, 1976)
- Live at the Royal Festival Hall (Enja, 1990)
- The Winter in Lisbon (Milan, 1991)

With Kip Hanrahan

- Desire Develops an Edge (American Clave, 1983)
- Vertical's Currency (American Clave, 1985)
- Days and Nights of Blue Luck Inverted (American Clave, 1987)
- Exotica (American Clave, 1992)
- Original Music from the Soundtrack of Pinero (American Clave, 2002)
- Beautiful Scars (American Clave, 2008)

With Conrad Herwig

- Que Viva Coltrane (Criss Cross, 2004)
- Sketches of Spain y Mas (Half Note 2006)
- The Latin Side of Miles Davis (Half Note 2004)

With Giovanni Hidalgo

- Worldwide (RMM, 1993)
- The Conga Kings with Candido, Carlos Patato Valdes (Chesky, 2001)

With Chico O'Farrill

- Heart of a Legend (Milestone, 1999)
- Carambola (Milestone, 2000)

With Eddie Palmieri

- Sentido (Coco, 1973)
- The Sun of Latin Music (Coco, 1974)
- Unfinished Masterpiece (Coco, 1975)
- Exploration (Coco, 1978)
- La Perfecta II (Concord, 2001)
- Ritmo Caliente (Concord, 2003)
- Simpático with Brian Lynch (ArtistShare, 2006)

With Tito Puente

- On Broadway (Concord Jazz Picante, 1983)
- El Rey (Concord Jazz Picante, 1984)
- Mambo Diablo with George Shearing (Concord Jazz Picante, 1985)
- Sensacion (Concord Jazz Picante, 1986)
- Un Poco Loco (Concord Jazz Picante, 1987)
- Salsa Meets Jazz Concord Jazz with Phil Woods (Concord Picante, 1988)
- Out of This World (Concord Picante, 1991)
- Mambo of the Times (Concord Jazz Picante, 1992)
- Royal T (Concord Picante, 1993)
- Live at the Village Gate (Bellaphon, 1993)
- Master Timbalero (Concord Jazz Picante, 1994)
- In Session (RMM, 1994)
- Special Delivery with Maynard Ferguson (Concord Jazz Picante, 1996)
- Live at Birdland Dancemania '99 (RMM, 1998)
- Mambo Birdland (RMM, 1999)
- Masterpiece/Obra Maestra (RMM, 2000)
- Live at the Playboy Jazz Festival (Concord, 2002)

With Tito Rodriguez

- Carnival of the Americas (Musicor, 1964)
- Big Band Latino (Musicor, 1968)
- Palladium Memories (1971)

With Típica 73

- En Cuba Intercambio Cultural (Fania, 1979)
- Charangueando Con La Típica 73 (Fania, 1980)
- Típica 73...Into the 80's (Fania, 1981)

With others

- Africando, Vol. 1 Trovador (Stern's Africa 1993)
- Africando, Vol. 2 Tierra Tradicional (Stern's Africa 1994)
- Alfredo "Chocolate" Armenteros, Chocolate En Sexteto (Caiman, 1983)
- Soledad Bravo, Mambembe (1983)
- George Coleman, Big George (Affinity 1980)
- Junior Cook, Good Cookin (Muse, 1980)
- Rafael Cortijo, Y Su Maquina Del Tiempo (Coco, 1973)
- Tito Gomez, Todo Queremos Mas (Aurora, 1986)
- Jerry Gonzalez, Ya Yo Me Cure (American Clave, 1980)
- Juan Luis Guerra, Fogarate! (BMG 1994)
- La Lupe, En Algo Nuevo (Tico, 1980)
- Machito, Fireworks (Coco, 1977)
- Arturo O'Farrill, Song for Chico (Zoho, 2008)
- Pat Patrick, Sound Advice (1977)
- Bobby Paunetto, Paunetto's Point (Pathfinder, 1975)
- Daniel Ponce, Chango Te Llama (Mango, 1991)
- Louie Ramirez, A Tribute To Cal Tjader (Caiman, 1986)
- Paquito D'Rivera, A Night in Englewood (Messidor, 1994)
- Alfredo Rodriguez, Monsieur Oh La La (Caiman, 1985)
- Mongo Santamaria, Afro American Latin (2000)
- Laba Sosseh, Salsa Africana Vol. 1 (Sacodis, 1980)
- Juan Pablo Torres, Together Again (Pimenta, 2002)
- Stanley Turrentine, New Time Shuffle (Blue Note, 1979)
- Dave Valentin, Tropic Heat (GRP, 1994)
- Fernando Villalona, Asi Soy Yo (Evesol 1984)
- Pete Yellin, It's the Right Thing (Mainstream 1973)
