= Orlando "Puntilla" Ríos =

Cuban musician

Orlando "Puntilla" Ríos (December 26, 1947 – August 12, 2008) was a percussionist/vocalist well known in Cuba and the Americas as a master of the many Cuban musical folkloric forms. Born in Havana, Puntilla came to U.S. in 1981 with the Mariel boatlift, quickly changing the batá scene in New York single-handedly, becoming the new influence for American bataleros. When 'Puntilla' arrived in New York, he brought with him a wealth of knowledge of the profound folkloric music unique to Cuba and became a teacher and mentor to many. Ríos was also the foundation of the religious community in New York, providing and guiding the music at ceremonies and celebrations throughout the tri-state area. He performed with great musicians from the worlds of both Latin music and jazz throughout the United States, South America, Europe, and Japan.

== Filmography ==
Year	Title	Role	Notes
1977	De Cierta Manera	Himself	
