= Kip Hanrahan =

American jazz impresario and percussionist (born 1954)

- Born: December 9, 1954 (age 71); Bronx, New York City
- Genres: Afro-Cuban music; Latin jazz; funk; rock; blues; avant-garde jazz; downtown
- Occupations: Musician; record producer; composer; arranger; conductor
- Instrument: Percussion
- Label: American Clavé

Kip Hanrahan (born December 9, 1954) is an American jazz music impresario, record producer and percussionist.

== Personal life ==
Hanrahan was born in a Puerto Rican neighborhood in the Bronx to an Irish-Jewish family. His father left when he was six months old, leaving his mother and grandfather to raise him. He has described his grandfather as "this cynical Russian communist" whose approval of rebellion against authority he cites as among his early musical influences.

While attending Cooper Union on a scholarship, he studied with visual-conceptual artist Hans Haacke. He has cited Haacke as his strongest influence. As part of his university study, he traveled to North Africa, and lived in India for a year.

In the 1970s he moved to Paris, France, to work on films with Michel Contat, Jean-Paul Sartre and Jean-Luc Godard. In his work as a composer, bandleader, and producer, he has compared his role to that of a film director, saying "Making a record is like making a film. If anything, the analogy holds too true. The recording engineer becomes the cinematographer; I work with the musicians as I would with actors: You sing the lines the way they should be phrased; you shoot scenes and the scenes are not in sequential order, and every scene has a different light and sound."

== Career ==
He has an unusual role in the albums released under his name, one which he has analogized to that of a film director. He assembles players and materials, combining modern/avant-garde/free jazz figures like David Murray, Don Pullen and Steve Swallow, Latin jazz players such as Milton Cardona and Horacio "El Negro" Hernandez, and occasionally rock musicians like Sting, Grayson Hugh, Fernando Saunders, and Jack Bruce.

He produced a number of significant recordings by the nuevo tango master Astor Piazzolla in the last decade of Piazzolla's life, as well as recordings by Latin music figures including Jerry Gonzalez. Hanrahan also worked with the poet Ishmael Reed on three recordings with the Conjure Ensemble, featuring Taj Mahal on the first release. The Conjure projects were not the only poetry-based albums. Darn It, a double CD released in 1993, gathered music to the poems of Paul Haines that Hanrahan had compiled over the past seven years since 1986, with contributions by a wide-ranging group of session musicians like Derek Bailey singing, duos by Evan Parker with Robert Wyatt and Carmen Lundy, Alex Chilton with a piano trio around Wayne Horvitz, Mary Margaret O'Hara with Gary Lucas and Steve Swallow, and John Oswald playing alto saxophone alongside fellow Canadian and multimedia artist Michael Snow, who also provided the cover and booklet design.

== Discography ==
All albums were released on Hanrahan's American Clavé label.

- Coup de tête (AMCL1007, 1981)
- Desire Develops an Edge (AMCL1008LP/09EP, 1983)
- Vertical's Currency (AMCL1010, 1985)
- A Few Short Notes for the End Run (AMCL1011EP, 1986)
- Days and Nights of Blue Luck Inverted (AMCL1012, 1987)
- Tenderness (AMCL1016, 1990)
- Exotica (AMCL1027 2, 1992 in Germany, 1994 in the US)
- Paul Haines – Darn It! (AMCL1014/18, 1993)
- All Roads Are Made of the Flesh (live and studio recordings, AMCL1029, 1995)
- A Thousand Nights and a Night (1 - Red Night) (AMCL1036, 1996)
- A Thousand Nights and a Night (Shadow Night 1) (AMCL1042, 1998)
- A Thousand Nights and a Night (Shadow Night 2) (AMCL1043, 1999)
- Original Music from the Soundtrack to Piñero (AMCL1056, 2002 in Japan, 2004 in the US)
- Beautiful Scars (AMCL1060, 2007 in Japan, 2008 in the US)
- At Home in Anger Which Could Also Be Called Imperfect, Happily (AMCL1060, 2011)
- Crescent Moon Waning (AMCL1062, 2017)

With Conjure

- Conjure: Music for the Texts of Ishmael Reed (AMCL1006, 1984)
- Cab Calloway Stands in for the Moon (AMCL 1015, 1988)
  - "Sputin" / "Nobody Was There" (12", AMCL1015/1, 1988)
- Bad Mouth (AMCL1052, 2006)

Albums produced by Hanrahan

- Jerry González – Ya Yo Me Curé (AMCL1001, 1980)
- Teo Macero – Teo (AMCL1002, 1981), co-produced by Teo Macero
- DNA – A Taste of DNA (AMCL1003EP, 1981)
- Milton Cardona – Bembé (AMCL1004, 1986)
- Astor Piazzolla y Su Quinteto Tango Nuevo – Tango: Zero Hour (AMCL1013, 1986)
- Astor Piazzolla – The Rough Dancer and the Cyclical Night (Tango Apasionado) (1988), co-produced by Astor Piazzolla
- Astor Piazzolla – La Camorra: The Solitude of Passionate Provocation (AMCL1021, 1989 in Europe, 1993 in the US)
- Astor Piazzolla – The Late Masterpieces (The Complete Work on American Clavé) (compilation, AMCL1022, 1993)
- American Clavé – Anthology (compilation, AMCL1020/1026, 1993)
- Deep Rumba – This Night Becomes a Rumba (AMCL1024, 1998), co-produced by Robby Ameen, Milton Cardona, Andy Gonzalez, Horacio "El Negro" Hernandez and Puntilla Orlando Ríos
- Milton Cardona – Cambucha (Carmen) (AMCL1028, 1999)
- Deep Rumba – A Calm in the Fire of Dances (AMCL1030, 2000), co-produced by Robby Ameen and Horacio Hernández
- Alfredo Triff – 21 Broken Melodies at Once (AMCL1023, 2001)
- Drawn from Memory (Greatest Hits or Whatever) (compilation, AMCL1033, 2001)
- I Was Born, But... (An anthology of more recent American Clave releases) (compilation, AMCL1034, 2001 in Japan)
- Silvana Deluigi – Yo! (AMCL1025, 2002)
- Horacio "El Negro" Hernández and Robby Ameen – Robby & Negro at the Third World War (La Timba No Es Como Ayer) (AMCL1031, 2002 in Japan), co-produced by Hernandez and Ameen
- Piri Thomas – Every Child Is Born a Poet (AMCL1032, 2006)
