= Milton Cardona =

Percussionist, vocalist and conga player from Mayagüez, Puerto Rico

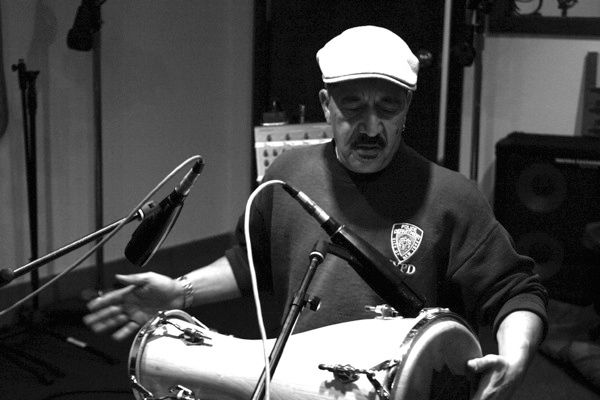

Background information
- Born: November 21, 1944; Mayagüez, Puerto Rico
- Died: September 19, 2014 (aged 69) Bronx, New York
- Genres: Jazz, world, Latin music
- Occupation(s): Musician, singer
- Instrument: Percussion
- Labels: American Clave

Milton Cardona (November 21, 1944 – September 19, 2014) was a percussionist, vocalist and conga player from Mayagüez, Puerto Rico.

Milton Cardona made well over 1000 recordings, nine of which won Grammies. His career and was highly influenced by Mongo Santamaria. He studied violin during his childhood in The Bronx, New York, and played bass guitar professionally in New York City as a youth before playing percussion. He collaborated with Kip Hanrahan, Spike Lee, Paul Simon, Willie Colón, David Byrne, Cachao, Larry Harlow, Eddie Palmieri, Don Byron, Celia Cruz, Guaco, Hector Lavoe, Ned Rothenberg, Rabih Abou-Khalil and Jack Bruce from the rock band Cream. He died on September 19, 2014, from heart failure.

== Early life ==
His family moved to the South Bronx, from Mayaguez, when he was 5 years old. He was a santero, a priest of Santería.

== Selected discography ==
- Beautiful Scars (2007)
- Bembé (1985)
- Cambucha (1999)
- Cosa Nuestra (1969)
- Rei Momo (1989)
- Songs from The Capeman (1997)
- Tenderness (1990)

With Rabih Abou-Khalil

- Blue Camel (Enja, 1992)
- The Sultan's Picnic (Enja, 1994)

With Billy Bang

- Prayer for Peace (Tum, 2010)

With Uri Caine

- The Goldberg Variations (Winter & Winter, 2000)
